= List of national korfball associations =

The International Korfball Federation has 72 members in five continental confederations (Europe, Asia, Africa, Americas and Oceania).

== Members by Regions ==
As of 31 May 2025

72 Members:

Number	Region	Countries
1	Africa	13
2	Asia	15
3	Oceania	2
4	Europe	30
5	Americas	12
Total	World	72

== Members ==
=== Europe ===
Country	Member	Year	National team	National league	Web site
Armenia	Korfball Federation of Armenia (KFA)	1990	Armenia		
Belarus	Belarus Korfball Federation (BKF)	2015	Belarus		
Belgium	Royal Belgian Korfball Federation (KBKB)	1933	Belgium	Topkorfbal League	website
Bosnia and Herzegovina	Korfball Federation of Bosnia and Herzegovina (KFBH)	2001	Bosnia-Herzegovina		
Bulgaria	Bulgarian Federation Korfball and Intercrosse (BFKI)	2005	Bulgaria		
Catalonia	Federació Catalana de Korfbal (FCK)	1997	Catalonia	Lliga Nacional	website
Croatia	Croatian Korfball Federation (CKF)	2009	Croatia		
Cyprus	Cyprus Korfball Federation (CKF)	1995	Cyprus		
Czech Republic	Czech Korfball Association (CKA)	1989	Czech Republic	Extraliga	website
England	English Korfball Association (EKA)	1946	England	England Korfball League	website
Finland	Finnish Korfball Committee (FKC)	1992	Finland		
France	Fédération Korfball France (FKF)	1982	France	Championnat National	website
Georgia	Georgian Korfball Federation (GKF)	2003	Georgia		
Germany	Deutscher Turner Bund e.V (DTB)	1964	Germany	Regionalliga Nord/West	website
Greece	Hellenic Korfball & Ball-Sports Federation (HKBSF)	2003	Greece		
Hungary	Hungarian Korfball Association (HKA)	1991	Hungary	NB 1	website
Ireland	Irish Korfball Association (IKA)	2007	Ireland		website
Italy	Federazione Italiana Korfball (FIK)	2003	Italy		website
Luxembourg	Federation Luxembourgeoise du Korfball (FLKB)	1976	Luxembourg		
Netherlands	Royal Dutch Korfball Association (KNKV)	1933	Netherlands	Korfbal League	website
Poland	Polish Federation of Korfball (PFK)	1988	Poland		website
Portugal	Federacao Portuguesa de Corfebol (FPC)	1987	Portugal	Corfebol Liga	website
Romania	Romanian Korfball Federation (RFK)	2003	Romania		
Russia	Russian Korfball Federation (RKF)	1997	Russia		website
Scotland	Scottish Korfball Association(SKA)	2006	Scotland	Scottish Korfball League Division 1	website
Serbia	Korfball Federation of Serbia (KFS)	2005	Serbia		website
Slovakia	Slovak Korfball Association (SAK)	1994	Slovakia		website
Sweden	Swedish Korfball Committee (SKC)	2002	Sweden		website
Switzerland	Fédération Suisse de Korfball (FSK)	2015	Switzerland		website
Turkey	Turkish Korfball Committee (TKC)	1997	Turkey	Türkiye Şampiyonası	website
Ukraine	Ukrainian Korfball Association (UKA)	2013	Ukraine		website
Wales	Welsh Korfball Association (WKA)	2006	Wales	Welsh Korfball League	website

=== Asia ===
Country	Member	Year	National team	National league	Web site
China	Chinese Korfball Association (CKA)	2006	China		
Chinese Taipei	Chinese Taipei Korfball Association (CTKA)	1985	Chinese Taipei		website
Hong Kong	Hong Kong China Korfball Association (HKCKA)	1988	Hong Kong	Hong Kong Korfball League	website
India	India Korfball Committee (IKC)	1980	India		
Indonesia	Persatuan Korfball Seluruh Indonesia (PKSI)	1984	Indonesia		
Japan	Japan Korfball Association (JKA)	1990	Japan		website
Korea Republic	Korea Korfball Federation (KKF)	2006	Korea		
Macau	Macau Korfball Association (MKA)	2000	Macau China		
Malaysia	Malaysian Korfball Association (MKA)	2007	Malaysia		
Nepal	Korfball Federation of Nepal (KFN)	2009	Nepal		
Pakistan	Pakistan Korfball Federation (PKF)	2008	Pakistan		
Philippines	Philippine Korfball Federation (PKF)	2014	Philippines		
Singapore	Singapore Korfball Federation (SKF)	2014	Singapore		website
Sri Lanka	Korfball Sri Lanka (KSL)	2015	Sri Lanka		
Thailand	Thailand Korfball Association (TKA)	2018	Thailand		

=== Americas ===
Country	Member	Year	National team	National league	Web site
Argentina	Asociación de Korfball Argentina (AKA)	2007	Argentina		website
Aruba	Korfball Bond Aruba (KBA)	1982	Aruba		
Brazil	Federaçao Corfebol Estado Rio de Janeiro (FCERJ)	2003	Brazil		website
Canada	Canada Korfball Association (CKA)	2007	Canada		
Colombia	Federacion Korfball Columbia (FKC)	2015	Colombia		
Costa Rica	Costa Rica Korfball Association (CRKA)	2014	Costa Rica		
Curaçao	Curaçaose Korfbalbond (CKB)	1986	Curaçao		
Dominican Republic	FEKORD	2007	Dominican Republic		
Suriname	Suriname Korfball Federation (SKF)	2017	Suriname		website
United States	United States Korfball Federation (USKF)	1978	United States		website

=== Africa ===
Country	Member	Year	National team	National league	Web site
Botswana	Korfball Association Botswana (KAB)	2008	Botswana		
Cameroon	Association Camerounaise de Korfball (ACK)	2015	Cameroon		
Ghana	Ghana Korfball Federation (GKF)	2014	Ghana		
Ivory Coast	Federation Ivoirienne de Korfball (FIK)	2015	Ivory Coast		website
Malawi	Malawi Korfball Association (MKA)	2006	Malawi		
Morocco	Moroccan Association for Korfball (MAK)	2015	Morocco		
South Africa	South African Korfball Federation (SAKF)	1993	South Africa		
Zambia	Korfball Federation of Zambia (KFZ)	2011	Zambia		
Zimbabwe	Zimbabwe Korfball Federation (ZKF)	2005	Zimbabwe		

=== Oceania ===
Country	Member	Year	National team	National league	Web site
Australia	Korfball Australia (KA)	1978	Australia		website
New Zealand	Korfball New Zealand (KNZI)	1998	New Zealand		website
