= 2022 Asia-Oceania Korfball Championship =

Tournament details
- Host country: Thailand
- Dates: 28 November – 3 December 2022
- Teams: 12
- Venue: 1 (in 1 host city)

Final positions
- Champions: Chinese Taipei (10th title)
- Runners-up: China
- Third place: Australia
- Fourth place: New Zealand

The 2022 Asia-Oceania Korfball Championship is the 11th edition of the Asia-Oceania Korfball Championship. The korfball competition was held in Pattaya, Thailand from 28 November to 3 December 2022. The Eastern National Sports Training Center served as the venue of the event.

Singapore made their debut in this tournament.

== Group stage ==
=== Group A ===
Pos	Team	Pld	W	OTW	OTL	L	GF	GA	GD	Pts	Qualification
1	Chinese Taipei	5	5	0	0	0	128	44	+84	15	Semi-finals
2	Australia	5	4	0	0	1	78	54	+24	12	Semi-finals
3	India	5	2	0	0	3	60	84	−24	6	5th place playoffs
4	Japan	5	2	0	0	3	53	68	−15	6	5th place playoffs
5	Thailand (H)	5	1	0	0	4	50	85	−35	3	7th–12th place playoffs
6	Malaysia	5	1	0	0	4	33	67	−34	3	7th–12th place playoffs

Source: IKF
(H) Host
November 28, 2022
13:45

Australia	18–8	India

November 28, 2022
15:45

Thailand	12–16	Japan

November 28, 2022
16:50

Chinese Taipei	20–5	Malaysia

November 29, 2022
10:00

Japan	10–15	India

November 29, 2022
11:05

Australia	17–5	Malaysia

November 29, 2022
12:10

Thailand	9–27	Chinese Taipei

November 29, 2022
16:30

Malaysia	11–10	India

November 29, 2022
17:35

Thailand	11–18	Australia

November 30, 2022
12:10

Japan	11–4	Malaysia

November 30, 2022
13:15

Chinese Taipei	23–10	Australia

November 30, 2022
14:20

Thailand	9–16	India

November 30, 2022
17:35

Chinese Taipei	22–9	Japan

December 1, 2022
12:05

Thailand	9–8	Malaysia

December 1, 2022
14:15

Australia	15–7	Japan

December 1, 2022
15:20

Chinese Taipei	36–11	India

=== Group B ===
Pos	Team	Pld	W	OTW	OTL	L	GF	GA	GD	Pts	Qualification
1	China	5	5	0	0	0	123	33	+90	15	Semi-finals
2	New Zealand	5	4	0	0	1	93	36	+57	12	Semi-finals
3	Hong Kong	5	3	0	0	2	80	43	+37	9	5th place playoffs
4	Indonesia	5	2	0	0	3	31	77	−46	6	5th place playoffs
5	Philippines	5	1	0	0	4	35	80	−45	3	7th–12th place playoffs
6	Singapore	5	0	0	0	5	23	116	−93	0	7th–12th place playoffs

Source: IKF
November 28, 2022
10:30

Hong Kong	31–6	Singapore

November 28, 2022
11:35

China	23–12	New Zealand

November 28, 2022
12:40

Indonesia	11–6	Philippines

November 28, 2022
17:55

New Zealand	23–1	Singapore

November 28, 2022
19:00

Hong Kong	16–6	Philippines

November 29, 2022
13:15

Hong Kong	18–6	Indonesia

November 29, 2022
14:20

New Zealand	21–5	Philippines

November 29, 2022
15:25

China	41–2	Singapore

November 30, 2022
10:00

New Zealand	26–0	Indonesia

November 30, 2022
11:05

China	14–8	Hong Kong

November 30, 2022
15:25

Philippines	11–8	Singapore

November 30, 2022
16:30

China	21–4	Indonesia

December 1, 2022
17:00

Hong Kong	7–11	New Zealand

December 1, 2022
13:10

Indonesia	10–6	Singapore

December 1, 2022
16:25

China	24–7	Philippines

== Knockout stage ==
=== Crossover games ===
==== 5th place play-offs ====
Semifinals losers are relegated to the 7th place playoffs

5th place semifinals
A3	India	25
B4	Indonesia	8
B3	Hong Kong	9
A4	Japan	10

Fifth place game
A3	India	12
A4	Japan	10

Source: IKF

===== Semifinals =====
December 2, 2022
12:00

India	25–8	Indonesia

December 2, 2022
13:30

Hong Kong	9–10	Japan

===== Fifth place game =====
December 4, 2022
12:00

India	12–10	Indonesia

==== 7th–12th place play-offs ====
Semifinals 1
A5	Thailand	21
B6	Singapore	6
B5	Philippines	6
A6	Malaysia	17

Semifinals 2
B4	Indonesia	8
A5	Thailand	15
B3	Hong Kong	17
B2	Malaysia	16

Seventh place game
B3	Thailand	8
A5	Hong Kong	9

Ninth place game
B4	Indonesia	7
A6	Malaysia	16
Eleventh place game
B6	Singapore	11
B5	Philippines	18

Source: IKF

===== Semifinals =====
December 2, 2022
15:00

Thailand	21–6	Singapore

December 2, 2022
16:30

Philippines	6–17	Malaysia

December 3, 2022
11:00

Indonesia	8–15	Thailand

December 3, 2022
12:30

Hong Kong	17–16	Malaysia

===== Eleventh place game =====
December 3, 2022
17:00

Singapore	11–18	Philippines

===== Ninth place game =====
December 4, 2022
9:00

Indonesia	7–16	Malaysia

===== Seventh place game =====
December 4, 2022
10:30

Thailand	8–9	Hong Kong

=== Main bracket ===
Semifinals
A1	Chinese Taipei	27
B2	New Zealand	12
B1	China	22
A2	Australia	17

Final
A1	Chinese Taipei	29
B1	China	17
Third place game
B2	New Zealand	11
A2	Australia	16

Source: IKF

==== Semifinals ====
December 3, 2022
14:00

Chinese Taipei	27–12	New Zealand

December 3, 2022
15:30

China	22–17	Australia

==== Third place game ====
December 4, 2022
13:30

New Zealand	11–16	Australia

==== Final ====
December 4, 2022
15:00

Chinese Taipei	29–17	China

== Final standings ==
The top 6 teams qualified for the 2023 IKF World Korfball Championship. As the tournament will be held in Taiwan, Chinese Taipei already has qualified as the hosts.

Qualify to the 2023 World Championship
Qualify to the 2023 World Championship but later withdrew
Qualify to the 2023 World Championship via wild card

Final standings
1st place, gold medalist(s)	Chinese Taipei
2nd place, silver medalist(s)	China
3rd place, bronze medalist(s)	Australia
4	New Zealand
5	India
6	Japan
7	Hong Kong
8	Thailand
9	Malaysia
10	Indonesia
11	Philippines
12	Singapore
