= 2024 IKF U17 Korfball World Cup =

Sporting event in the Netherlands

Tournament details
- Host country: Netherlands
- Dates: 29–30 June 2024
- Teams: 10
- Venue(s): De Vijfkamp, Eindhoven

Final positions
- Champions: Netherlands
- Runners-up: Chinese Taipei
- Third place: Belgium
- Fourth place: Czech Republic

The 24th edition of the U17 Korfball World Cup took place in Eindhoven, Netherlands. It has been organized by the Royal Dutch Korfball Association (KNKV) and patronized by the International Korfball Federation.

Netherlands won the trophy after winning every game during the tournament and took back the trophy won by the Chinese Taipei team during the previous edition.

== Group stage ==
Competing countries were divided into two groups of five teams.

=== Group A ===
Pos	Team	Pld	W	L	GF	GA	GD	Pts	
1	Netherlands	4	4	0	107	23	+84	12	Semifinals
2	Czech Republic	4	3	1	42	41	+1	9	Semifinals
3	England	4	2	2	32	56	−24	6	
4	Germany	4	1	3	30	60	−30	3	
5	Hungary	4	0	4	26	57	−31	0	

Updated to match(es) played on 29 June 2024. Source:

Home \ Away	CZE	ENG	GER	HUN	NED
Czech Republic	—	10–6	13–7		7–21
England		—		9–6	
Germany		7–13	—		6–27
Hungary	7–12		7–10	—	
Netherlands		33–4		26–6	—

Updated to match(es) played on 29 June 2024. Source:
Legend: Blue = home team win; Yellow = draw; Red = away team win.

=== Group B ===
Pos	Team	Pld	W	L	GF	GA	GD	Pts	
1	Chinese Taipei	4	4	0	71	29	+42	12	Semifinals
2	Belgium	4	3	1	67	28	+39	9	Semifinals
3	Catalonia	4	2	2	34	62	−28	6	
4	Portugal	4	1	3	31	40	−9	3	
5	Slovakia	4	0	4	22	66	−44	0	

Updated to match(es) played on 29 June 2024. Source:

Home \ Away	BEL	(Catalonia) CAT	POR	SVK	TPE
Belgium	—		10–3		16–19
Catalonia	4–20	—		12–9	
Portugal		11–12	—		
Slovakia	2–21		7–14	—	
Chinese Taipei		22–6	11–3	19–4	—

Updated to match(es) played on 29 June 2024. Source:
Legend: Blue = home team win; Yellow = draw; Red = away team win.

== Final stages ==
30 June 2024
09:30 (CEST)
Game 21

Slovakia	8-12	England
	Report

30 June 2024
09:30 (CEST)
Game 22

Catalonia	12-13	Hungary
	Report

30 June 2024
10:20 (CEST)
Semifinal 1

Netherlands	25-11	Belgium
	Report

30 June 2024
10:20 (CEST)
Game 24

Germany	6-8	Portugal
	Report

30 June 2024
11:20 (CEST)
Semifinal 2

Chinese Taipei	25-25	Czech Republic
	Report

30 June 2024
11:20 (CEST)
Game 26

Hungary	13-9	Slovakia
	Report

30 June 2024
12:30 (CEST)
Game 27

Germany	14-12	Catalonia
	Report

30 June 2024
12:15 (CEST)
Game 28

England	10-5	Portugal
	Report

30 June 2024
13:45 (CEST)
Game 29

England	10-12	Catalonia
	Report

30 June 2024
13:45 (CEST)
Game 30

Portugal	14-9	Hungary
	Report

30 June 2024
14:45 (CEST)
3rd place

Czech Republic	13-21	Belgium
	Report

30 June 2024
14:45 (CEST)
Game 32

Germany	14-2	Slovakia
	Report

30 June 2024
16:00 (CEST)
Final

Netherlands	26-15	Chinese Taipei
	Report

== Final ranking ==
Rank	Team
1st place, gold medalist(s)	Netherlands
2nd place, silver medalist(s)	Chinese Taipei
3rd place, bronze medalist(s)	Belgium
4	Czech Republic
5	England
6	Catalonia
7	Portugal
8	Germany
9	Hungary
10	Slovakia

== See also ==
- List of national korfball associations
- IKF World Korfball Ranking
