= 2014 Asia-Oceania Korfball Championship =

Tournament details
- Host country: Hong Kong
- Dates: 17–23 August 2014
- Teams: 10
- Venue: 1 (in 1 host city)

Final positions
- Champions: Chinese Taipei (8th title)
- Runners-up: Australia
- Third place: China
- Fourth place: Hong Kong

Tournament statistics
- Matches played: 33
- Goals scored: 1,125 (34.09 per match)
- Top scorer: (Chinese Taipei) Chun Hsien (Ricky) Wu (36 Goals)

The 2014 Asia-Oceania Korfball Championship was held in Hong Kong with 10 national teams in competition, from August 17 to 23.

== First round ==
=== Group A ===
| Pos | Team | Pld | W | OTW | OTL | L | GF | GA | GD | Pts | Qualification |
|---|---|---|---|---|---|---|---|---|---|---|---|
| 1 | Chinese Taipei | 4 | 4 | 0 | 0 | 0 | 146 | 41 | +105 | 12 | Semi-finals |
| 2 | Hong Kong (H) | 4 | 3 | 0 | 0 | 1 | 83 | 46 | +37 | 9 | Quarter-finals |
| 3 | New Zealand | 4 | 2 | 0 | 0 | 2 | 34 | 73 | −39 | 6 | Quarter-finals |
| 4 | South Korea | 4 | 1 | 0 | 0 | 3 | 35 | 75 | −40 | 3 | |
| 5 | Japan | 4 | 0 | 0 | 0 | 4 | 37 | 100 | −63 | 0 | |

Source: IKF
(H) Host

=== Group B ===
| Pos | Team | Pld | W | OTW | OTL | L | GF | GA | GD | Pts | Qualification |
|---|---|---|---|---|---|---|---|---|---|---|---|
| 1 | Australia | 4 | 4 | 0 | 0 | 0 | 106 | 27 | +79 | 12 | Semi-finals |
| 2 | China | 4 | 3 | 0 | 0 | 1 | 110 | 40 | +70 | 9 | Quarter-finals |
| 3 | Malaysia | 4 | 2 | 0 | 0 | 2 | 41 | 67 | −26 | 6 | Quarter-finals |
| 4 | Macau | 4 | 1 | 0 | 0 | 3 | 36 | 93 | −57 | 3 | |
| 5 | Indonesia | 4 | 0 | 0 | 0 | 4 | 24 | 90 | −66 | 0 | |

Source: IKF

== Final round ==
Quarterfinals
China | 23
New Zealand | 7
Hong Kong | 18
Malaysia | 9

Semifinals
Chinese Taipei | 38
China | 19
Australia | 21
Hong Kong | 16

Finals
Chinese Taipei | 45
Australia | 27
Third place
China | 22
Hong Kong | 19

== Final standings ==
Final standings
| 1st place, gold medalist(s) | Chinese Taipei |
| 2nd place, silver medalist(s) | Australia |
| 3rd place, bronze medalist(s) | China |
| 4 | Hong Kong |
| 5 | Malaysia |
| 6 | New Zealand |
| 7 | South Korea |
| 8 | Macau |
| 9 | Japan |
| 10 | Indonesia |
