= 2018 IKF European Korfball Championship First Round =

2017 European Korfball Championship First Round
Tournament details
- Host country: Hungary
- City: Budapest
- Dates: 28–29 October 2017
- Teams: 8
- Venue(s): 1 (in 1 host city)

Final positions
- Champions: Hungary
- Runners-up: Serbia
- Third place: Ireland
- Fourth place: Greece

Tournament statistics
- Matches played: 18
- Goals scored: 434 (24.11 per match)
- Top scorer(s): (Republic of Ireland) Shay Conroy (23)

The 2018 IKF European Korfball Championship First Round was held in Budapest, Hungary on 28 and 29 October 2017. The tournament served as the first round of the 2018 IKF European Korfball Championships to be held in the Netherlands in 2018, with both the winner and runner-up qualifying for the 2018 IKF European Korfball B-Championship. Hungary and Serbia qualified on 29 October 2017 as they won their semi-final matches against Ireland and Greece respectively. Later that same day, Hungary beat Serbia to win the tournament.

== Participating teams ==
Eight teams participated in the tournament: Armenia, Greece, Hungary, Ireland, Serbia, Sweden, Switzerland and Ukraine. For Switzerland and Ukraine this was the first international tournament.

== Group stage ==
Two groups (A and B) of four teams were drawn, with each team playing the other teams in their group once. The top two teams in these groups will move to the semi-finals. The other teams will also be paired with a team from the other group in the same position, to playoff for overall position.

All group stage matches were played at the Gabányi László Sportcsarnok in Budapest on 28 October 2017.

=== Group A ===
Pos	Team	Pld	W	OTW	OTL	L	GF	GA	GD	Pts	Qualification
1	Serbia	3	2	1	0	0	45	25	+20	8	Semi-finals
2	Ireland	3	2	0	1	0	47	27	+20	7	Semi-finals
3	Switzerland	3	1	0	0	2	19	39	−20	3	Play-offs
4	Armenia	3	0	0	0	3	16	36	−20	0	Play-offs

Source: IKF

Team 1	Score	Team 2
Serbia	11 − 2	Armenia
Ireland	16 − 2	Switzerland
Serbia	17 − 7	Switzerland
Ireland	15 − 8	Armenia
Serbia	17^{G} − 16	Ireland
Switzerland	10 − 6	Armenia

Key: ^{G} denotes win by golden goal.

=== Group B ===
Pos	Team	Pld	W	OTW	OTL	L	GF	GA	GD	Pts	Qualification
1	Hungary	3	3	0	0	0	50	22	+28	9	Semi-finals
2	Greece	3	2	0	0	1	37	39	−2	6	Semi-finals
3	Sweden	3	1	0	0	2	30	38	−8	3	Play-offs
4	Ukraine	3	0	0	0	3	32	50	−18	0	Play-offs

Source: IKF

Team 1	Score	Team 2
Sweden	8 − 10	Greece
Hungary	18 − 5	Ukraine
Sweden	13 − 12	Ukraine
Hungary	16 − 8	Greece
Hungary	16 − 9	Sweden
Greece	19 − 15	Ukraine

== Semi-finals ==
Semi-finals
Hungary	17
Ireland	7
Serbia	12
Greece	7

Final
Hungary	24
Serbia	11
Third place
Ireland	24
Greece	5

== 5th–8th place play-offs ==
The teams finishing third in both groups played a match to determine fifth place, the teams finish fourth to determine seventh place.

Team 1	Score	Team 2
Ukraine	13 − 17	Armenia
Sweden	14 − 7	Switzerland

== Final standing ==
Key
Qualified for the 2018 IKF European Korfball B-Championship

Rank	Team
1st place, gold medalist(s)	Hungary
2nd place, silver medalist(s)	Serbia
3rd place, bronze medalist(s)	Ireland
4	Greece
5	Sweden
6	Switzerland
7	Armenia
8	Ukraine
