= 2005 Korfball European Bowl =

International sporting event

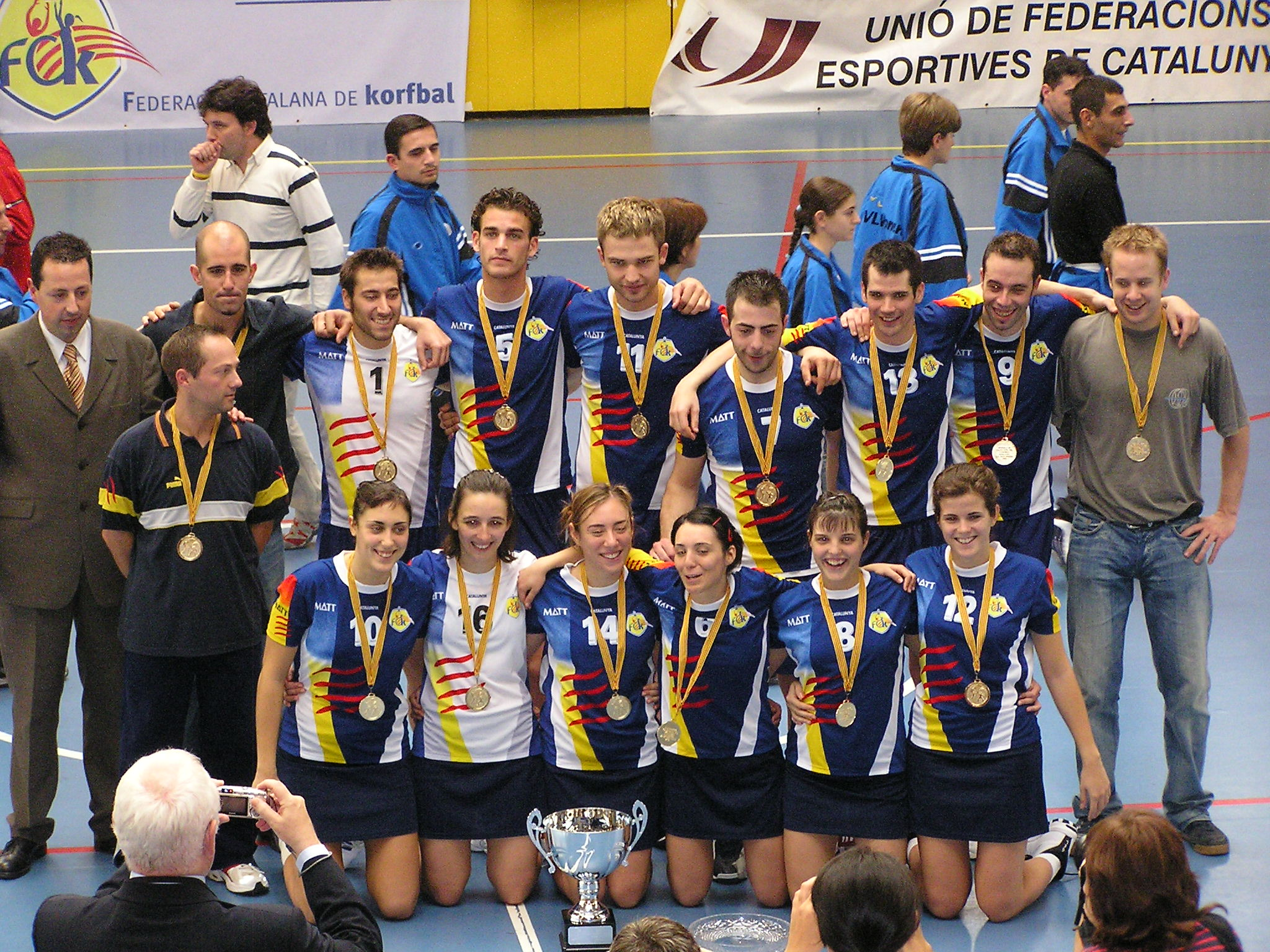
Catalonia, European Bowl 2005 champions

2005 European Bowl was the European Championship "B" of korfball, played in Terrassa (Catalonia), from October 27 to 30 of 2005, with the participation of 5 national teams: Catalonia, Russia, Portugal, Poland and Armenia. The matches were played at Can Jofresa Pavilion.

This championship "B", played for the first time, gave two places for the 2006 European Korfball Championship, and four for the 2007 Korfball World Championship.

International Korfball Federation decided also to name this championship as Jan Hanekroot, honouring one of the most involucrated person in korfball.

The champions were Catalonia, winning their first continental title ever.

== Results ==
27/10/05	Portugal	24–5	Armenia
27/10/05	Portugal	19–9	Poland
27/10/05	Catalonia	14–11	Russia
28/10/05	Russia	17–12	Poland
28/10/05	Armenia	7–22	Catalonia
29/10/05	Portugal	14–15	Russia
29/10/05	Russia	21–10	Armenia
29/10/05	Catalonia	16*–15	Poland
30/10/05	Armenia	12–19	Poland
30/10/05	Catalonia	10–9	Portugal

* golden goal

	Pts	P	W	L	PF	PA
Catalonia	11	4	4*	0	62	42
Russia	9	4	3	1	64	50
Portugal	6	4	2	2	66	39
Poland	4	4	1	3	55	64
Armenia	0	4	0	4	34	86

=== Final standings ===
Final standings
1	Catalonia
2	Russia
3	Portugal
4	Poland
5	Armenia

== See also ==
- International Korfball Federation
- Korfball European Bowl
