= 1987 Korfball World Championship =

Tournament details
- Host country: Netherlands
- Cities: Amsterdam, Bennekom, Dordrecht, Papendrecht, Rotterdam and Wormer
- Dates: 20 to 25 April 1987
- Teams: 8
- Venues: 6 (in 6 host cities)

Final positions
- Champions: Netherlands (3rd title)
- Runners-up: Belgium
- Third place: Great Britain
- Fourth place: Chinese Taipei

The 1987 Korfball World Championship was the 3rd edition of the major international korfball competition. It was held in the Netherlands on April 20–25, in the cities of Amsterdam, Bennekom, Dordrecht, Papendrecht, Rotterdam and Wormer. In a close final, Netherlands defeated Belgium by 9–7.

== Pool matches ==
Legend

Pts = Points; P = Played games W = Win (2p); L = Lost	F = Korfs favour A = Korfs against D = Difference korfs (KF-KA)

POOL A	Pts	P	W	L	F	A	D
Netherlands	10	5	5	0	117	40	+77
Chinese Taipei ^{*}	6	5	3	2	53	61	−8
West Germany	6	5	3	2	50	42	+8
United States	6	5	3	2	61	52	+9
Indonesia	2	5	1	4	29	64	−35
France	0	5	0	5	28	79	−51

^{*} Chinese Taipei, West Germany and USA have held an additional penalty shoot-out to determine second, third and fourth position.

April 20, 1987
April 20, 1987	Indonesia	6–11	Chinese Taipei	Amsterdam

April 20, 1987
April 20, 1987	Netherlands	23–6	West Germany	Amsterdam

April 20, 1987
April 20, 1987	United States	20–4	France	Wormer

April 20, 1987
April 20, 1987	France	11–28	Netherlands	Bennekom

April 20, 1987
April 20, 1987	Chinese Taipei	8–7	West Germany	Bennekom

April 20, 1987
April 20, 1987	Indonesia	4–13	United States	Papendrecht

April 21, 1987
April 21, 1987	Netherlands	21–10	Indonesia	Papendrecht

April 21, 1987
April 21, 1987	France	3–14	West Germany	Papendrecht

April 21, 1987
April 21, 1987	Chinese Taipei	15–18 (pen s.o.); 13-13 (e.t.); 10-10 at full time	United States	Wormer

April 22, 1987
April 22, 1987	West Germany	13–2	Indonesia	Amsterdam

April 22, 1987
April 22, 1987	United States	4–21	Netherlands	Dordrecht

April 22, 1987
April 22, 1987	Chinese Taipei	10–4	France	Dordrecht

April 23, 1987
April 23, 1987	West Germany	8–6	United States	Amsterdam

April 23, 1987
April 23, 1987	Netherlands	24–9	Chinese Taipei	Wormer

April 23, 1987
April 23, 1987	France	6–7	Indonesia	Dordrecht

POOL B	Pts	P	W	L	F	A	D
Belgium	10	5	5	0	102	46	+56
Great Britain	8	5	4	1	47	44	+3
Australia	6	5	3	2	39	50	-11
Aruba	4	5	2	3	67	70	-3
Portugal	2	5	1	4	42	65	−23
Spain	0	5	0	5	48	70	−22

April 20, 1987
April 20, 1987	Portugal	6–10	Great Britain	Papendrecht

April 20, 1987
April 20, 1987	Australia	9–19	Belgium	Papendrecht

April 20, 1987
April 20, 1987	Spain	17–20 (pen s.o.); 14-14 (e.t.); 10-10 at full time	Aruba	Wormer

April 20, 1987
April 20, 1987	Aruba	15–13	Portugal	Papendrecht

April 20, 1987
April 20, 1987	Australia	7–13	Great Britain	Dordrecht

April 20, 1987
April 20, 1987	Belgium	20–10	Spain	Dordrecht

April 21, 1987
April 21, 1987	Spain	10–11	Portugal	Amsterdam

April 21, 1987
April 21, 1987	Aruba	6–8	Australia	Amsterdam

April 21, 1987
April 21, 1987	Great Britain	3–18	Belgium	Wormer

April 22, 1987
April 22, 1987	Portugal	5–7	Australia	Bennekom

April 22, 1987
April 22, 1987	Belgium	22–17	Aruba	Bennekom

April 22, 1987
April 22, 1987	Great Britain	11–4	Spain	Amsterdam

April 23, 1987
April 23, 1987	Great Britain	10–9	Aruba	Amsterdam

April 23, 1987
April 23, 1987	Australia	8–7	Spain	Wormer

April 23, 1987
April 23, 1987	Belgium	23–7	Portugal	Dordrecht

== Final round ==
=== 11th–12th places ===
April 25, 1987
April 25, 1987	France	7–10	Spain	Papendrecht

=== 9th–10th places ===
April 25, 1987
April 25, 1987	Indonesia	5–8	Portugal	Amsterdam

=== 7th–8th places ===
April 25, 1987
April 25, 1987	United States	12–6	Aruba	Amsterdam

=== 5th–6th places ===
April 25, 1987
April 25, 1987	West Germany	10–7	Australia	Papendrecht

=== Bronze medal match ===
April 25, 1987
April 25, 1987	Chinese Taipei	5-9 (e.t.); 4-4 at full time	Great Britain	Rotterdam

=== Final ===
April 25, 1987
April 25, 1987	Netherlands	9–7	Belgium	Rotterdam

== Final standings ==
Team
1 Netherlands
2 Belgium
3 Great Britain
4 Chinese Taipei
5 West Germany
6 Australia
7 United States
8 Aruba
9 Portugal
10 Indonesia
11 Spain
12 France

== See also ==
- Korfball World Championship
- International Korfball Federation
