= Korfball in India =

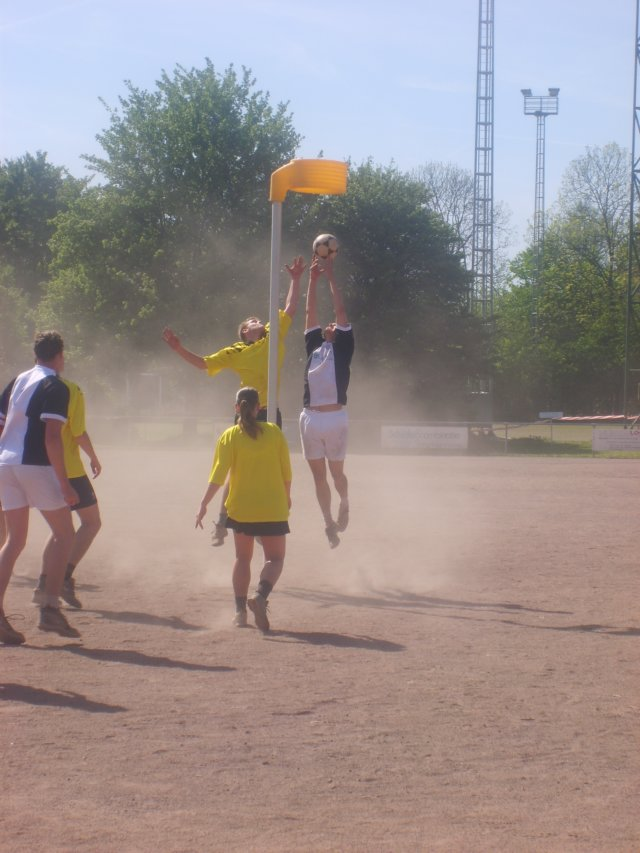
- Jump korfball match in the Netherlands
- Country: India
- National team: India

India is the oldest korfball playing country in Asia. In 1979, when the game was first introduced in India, korfball popularity has continued to rise and now the game is being played in 27 States with each state having its own association to promote and organize events. Korfball is recognized by the Union Ministry for Youth Affairs and Sports, Government of India and national championships in senior, junior and sub-junior categories and the inter-University and inter-school championships are being held regularly.

The Indian korfball team participated in the Asian – Oceania U23 Youth Korfball Championship in Adelaide (Australia) held between 9–16 July. The team reached the final where it lost against the reigning Asian – Oceania Korfball Champion, Chinese Taipei on 16 July 2011. India won five out of seven matches it played. The matches it won were against Australia, New Zealand, Malaysia, Hong Kong and China. The only matches it lost were both against Chinese Taipei, including the final.

India came third place 2 times (2002 & 2006) in the Asia-Oceania Korfball Championship.

== Professional league ==
In 2026, the Korfball Premier League (KPL) was launched as India's first professional korfball league, co-organised by Sporty Bharat and Entertainment Private Limited and Game Changers FZCO, with the support of the Korfball Federation of India and the Foreign Correspondents' Club of South Asia. The inaugural season, scheduled for September 2026, features eight franchise teams with a total of 112 players — 62 Indian and 50 international players from more than 20 countries — with a prize pool of ₹31 lakh for the winning team and ₹11 lakh for the runner-up.
