= All-Africa Korfball Championship =

All-Africa Korfball Championship (AAKC) is a korfball competition for African national teams organized by the International Korfball Federation. It has been held every four years since 2006 with the winner qualifying through to the IKF World Korfball Championship in the following year.

The first championship was held in South Africa with the host nation and Zimbabwe competing for a spot at the 2007 World Championship. After the same two teams competed in 2010, the competition expanded to four teams with Malawi and Zambia competing for the first time.

In 2022 the competition expanded with Africa dividing into two region South and North- West. Ghana, Morocco and the host Ivory Coast participated in IKF AAKC North-West 2022. The IKF All-Africa Korfball Championship South 2022 was hosted by the Korfball Federation of Zambia in Lusaka, Zambia, from 11-13 November 2022. IKF Africa Members from the IOC ANOCA zones 5, 6 and 7 were invited to this tournament, that served as a qualification event for the IKF World Korfball Championship 2023.

== History ==
	Year	Host	Champion	Second place	Third place	Number of Teams
I Details	2006	South Africa	South Africa	Zimbabwe	—N/a	2
II Details	2010	Zimbabwe	South Africa	Zimbabwe	—N/a	2
III Details	2014	Zambia	South Africa	Zimbabwe	Zambia	4
IV Details	2018	Harare, Zimbabwe	South Africa	Zimbabwe	Zambia	3
V (North/West) Details	2022	Abidjan, Ivory Coast	Morocco	Ivory Coast	Ghana	3
V (South) Details	2022	Lusaka, Zambia	Zimbabwe	South Africa	Zambia	3
VI (North) Details	2026	Nador, Morocco	Morocco	Ivory Coast	—N/a	2
VI (South) Details	2026	Blantyre, Malawi	Zimbabwe	Malawi	—N/a	2
