= Italy team =

Italy team or Team Italy may refer to:

- Italy national football team
- Italy national cricket team
- Italy national rugby union team
- Italy national rugby sevens team
- Italy national rugby league team
- Italy national basketball team
- Italy national beach soccer team
- Italy national badminton team
- Italy national futsal team
- Italy national korfball team
