= Mongolia national korfball team =

National sports team

Mongolia
- Association: Mongolian Korfball Association (MKA)
- IKF membership: 2010
- IKF code: MON (Mongolia)
- IKF rank: 46 (November 2014)

The Mongolia national korfball team is managed by the Mongolian Korfball Federation (MKF), representing Mongolia in korfball international competitions. They became an International Korfball Federation in 2010.
