= 2014 All-Africa Korfball Championship =

2014 All Africa Korfball Championship
Tournament details
- Host country: Zambia
- City: Lusaka
- Dates: 6 August 2014– 8 August 2014
- Teams: 4
- Venue(s): 1 (in 1 host city)

Final positions
- Champions: South Africa (3rd title)
- Runners-up: Zimbabwe
- Third place: Zambia
- Fourth place: Malawi

Tournament statistics
- Matches played: 8
- Goals scored: 194 (24.25 per match)
- Top scorer(s): (South Africa) Werner Basson (22 Goals)

The 2014 All-Africa Korfball Championship was held in Zambia from August 6 to August 8, with 4 national teams in competition.

The tournament also served as an African qualifier for the 2015 Korfball World Championship, with the top nation qualifying for the world championship.

== Group stage ==
The Group Stage took place on the 6th and 7 August.

Pos	Team	Pld	W	OTW	OTL	L	GF	GA	GD	Pts	Qualification
1	South Africa	3	3	0	0	0	69	18	+51	9	1st place Match
2	Zimbabwe	3	2	0	0	1	40	30	+10	6	1st place Match
3	Malawi	3	1	0	0	2	21	38	−17	3	3rd place Match
4	Zambia	3	0	0	0	3	9	53	−44	0	3rd place Match

Team 1	Score	Team 2
South Africa	25 − 2	Zambia
Malawi	4 − 13	Zimbabwe
Zimbabwe	15 − 4	Zambia
Malawi	4 − 22	South Africa
Malawi	13 − 3	Zambia
Zimbabwe	12 − 22	South Africa

== Finals ==
The Finals took place on the 8th of August.

1st place match South Africa 21 - 11 Zimbabwe

3rd place match Malawi 11 - 12^{G} Zambia

Key: ^{G} denotes win by golden goal.

== Final standing ==
Rank	Team
1st place, gold medalist(s)	South Africa
2nd place, silver medalist(s)	Zimbabwe
3rd place, bronze medalist(s)	Zambia
4	Malawi
