= 1991 Korfball World Championship =

Tournament details
- Host country: Belgium
- Cities: Antwerp, Berchem, Brussels, Ghent and Turnhout
- Dates: 2 to 6 April 1991
- Teams: 12
- Venues: 5 (in 5 host cities)

Final positions
- Champions: Belgium (1st title)
- Runners-up: Netherlands
- Third place: Chinese Taipei
- Fourth place: Germany

The 1991 Korfball World Championship was the 4th edition of the major international korfball competition. It was held in Belgium on April 2–6, in the cities of Antwerp, Berchem, Brussels, Ghent and Turnhout. In a very close final, Belgium defeated the Netherlands by 11–10, making this the only time the world championship was not won by the Netherlands.

== Pool matches ==
Legend

Pts = Points; P = Played games W = Win (2p); L = Lost	F = Korfs favour A = Korfs against D = Difference korfs (KF-KA)

Pool A
Team	Pts	P	W	L	F	A	D
Belgium	10	5	5	0	130	48	+82
Germany	8	5	4	1	50	61	−11
Portugal ^{*}	4	5	2	3	56	70	−14
United States	4	5	2	3	68	57	+11
Australia	4	5	2	3	63	66	−3
Indonesia	0	5	0	5	37	102	−65

^{*} Portugal was awarded third place because it lost a match after extra-time. USA ranked above Australia on korf difference.

April 2, 1991
April 2, 1991	Australia	19–7	Indonesia	Antwerp

April 2, 1991
April 2, 1991	Portugal	10–9	United States	Antwerp

April 2, 1991
April 2, 1991	Belgium	27–5	Germany	Antwerp

April 3, 1991
April 3, 1991	Belgium	21–15	United States	Ghent

April 3, 1991
April 3, 1991	Indonesia	6–23	Portugal	Ghent

April 3, 1991
April 3, 1991	Australia	8–9	Germany	Turnhout

April 4, 1991
April 4, 1991	Belgium	24–11	Indonesia	Antwerp

April 4, 1991
April 4, 1991	Germany	12–11	United States	Brussels

April 4, 1991
April 4, 1991	Australia	16–10	Portugal	Brussels

April 4, 1991
April 4, 1991	Germany	9–8 (e.t.)	Portugal	Antwerp

April 4, 1991
April 4, 1991	Australia	12–28	Belgium	Brussels

April 4, 1991
April 4, 1991	Indonesia	6–21	United States	Brussels

April 5, 1991
April 5, 1991	Australia	8–12	United States	Antwerp

April 5, 1991
April 5, 1991	Germany	15–7	Indonesia	Ghent

April 5, 1991
April 5, 1991	Belgium	30–5	Portugal	Turnhout

Pool B
Team	Pts	P	W	L	F	A	D
Netherlands	10	5	5	0	121	71	+50
Chinese Taipei	8	5	4	1	76	61	+15
Great Britain	6	5	3	2	76	59	+17
Armenia	4	5	2	3	67	67	+0
Aruba	2	5	1	4	70	94	−24
India	0	5	0	5	61	119	−58

April 2, 1991
April 2, 1991	Great Britain	6–19	Netherlands	Antwerp

April 2, 1991
April 2, 1991	Armenia	16–12	Aruba	Antwerp

April 2, 1991
April 2, 1991	India	8–20	Chinese Taipei	Antwerp

April 3, 1991
April 3, 1991	Aruba	14–9	India	Antwerp

April 3, 1991
April 3, 1991	Armenia	8–11	Great Britain	Antwerp

April 3, 1991
April 3, 1991	Chinese Taipei	14–20	Netherlands	Turnhout

April 4, 1991
April 4, 1991	Armenia	7–22	Netherlands	Antwerp

April 4, 1991
April 4, 1991	Aruba	14–18	Chinese Taipei	Ghent

April 4, 1991
April 4, 1991	Great Britain	25–10	India	Ghent

April 4, 1991
April 4, 1991	Armenia	9–12	Chinese Taipei	Antwerp

April 4, 1991
April 4, 1991	Aruba	10–24	Great Britain	Ghent

April 4, 1991
April 4, 1991	India	24–33	Netherlands	Ghent

April 5, 1991
April 5, 1991	Great Britain	10–12	Chinese Taipei	Antwerp

April 5, 1991
April 5, 1991	Aruba	20–27	Netherlands	Ghent

April 5, 1991
April 5, 1991	Armenia	27–10	India	Turnhout

== Final round ==
=== 11th–12th places ===
April 6, 1991
April 6, 1991	India	15–9	Indonesia	Antwerp

=== 9th–10th places ===
April 6, 1991
April 6, 1991	Australia	13–5	Aruba	Berchem

=== 7th–8th places ===
April 6, 1991
April 6, 1991	United States	16–6	Armenia	Antwerp

=== 5th–6th places ===
April 6, 1991
April 6, 1991	Great Britain	20–13	Portugal	Berchem

=== Bronze medal match ===
April 6, 1991
April 6, 1991	Chinese Taipei	10–8	Germany	Antwerp

=== Final ===
April 6, 1991
April 6, 1991	Belgium	11–10	Netherlands	Antwerp

== Final standings ==
Team
1 Belgium
2 Netherlands
3 Chinese Taipei
4 Germany
5 Great Britain
6 Portugal
7 United States
8 Armenia
9 Australia
10 Aruba
11 India
12 Indonesia

== See also ==
- Korfball World Championship
- International Korfball Federation
