= Korfball Federation of Armenia =

Sports organization of Armenia

Korfball Federation of Armenia logo

The Korfball Federation of Armenia (KFA) (Armenian: Հայաստանի կորֆբոլի ֆեդերացիա), is the regulating body of korfball in Armenia, governed by the Armenian Olympic Committee. The headquarters of the federation is located in Yerevan.

== History ==
The Korfball Federation of Armenia was established in 1991 and is currently led by President Vardan Shahumyan. The Federation oversees the training of korfball athletes and is responsible for the development of korfball in the country. The Federation organizes Armenia's participation in European and international korfball competitions, including in the IKF World Korfball Championships. The Federation is a full member of the International Korfball Federation.

== Activities ==
The Federation manages the Armenia national korfball team and the Armenian national beach korfball team.

The Armenia national korfball team participated in the 2016 International Korfball Tournament in the Netherlands.

On 28 August 2021, the Armenian national beach korfball team participated in the International Beach Korfball tournament in The Hague, the Netherlands.

== See also ==
- List of national korfball associations
- Sport in Armenia
