= 2018 All-Africa Korfball Championship =

2018 All Africa Korfball Championship
Tournament details
- Host country: Zimbabwe
- City: Chitungwiza
- Dates: 27 April 2018– 29 April 2018
- Teams: 3
- Venue(s): 1 (in 1 host city)

Final positions
- Champions: South Africa (4th title)
- Runners-up: Zimbabwe
- Third place: Zambia

Tournament statistics
- Matches played: 6
- Goals scored: 185 (30.83 per match)

The 2018 All-Africa Korfball Championship (AAKC) was held in Chitungwiza, Zimbabwe, from 27 April to 29 April, with 3 national teams in competition.

== Summary ==
The tournament also served as an African qualifier for the 2019 IKF World Korfball Championship, with the top two African nations qualifying for the world championship. However, as the World Championship will be held in South Africa, they qualified automatically as hosts and hence only the top team (besides South Africa) will qualify.

Although open to more participants, only three teams registered for the tournament. Besides the host Zimbabwe, South Africa and Zambia participated. The structure of the tournament features a group stage in which all teams play each other twice, after which ties were broken by the higher number of goals scored in the winning match between the teams in question.

Defending champions South Africa retained their title, although they lose once to Zimbabwe and were tied in points at the end of the group stage. South Africa ranked ahead of Zimbabwe as they scored more goals in their winning match (20 vs 17).

== Group stage ==
The group stage took place on 27, 28 and 29 April 2018.

Pos	Team	Pld	W	OTW	OTL	L	GF	GA	GD	Pts	Qualification
1	South Africa (Q)	4	3	0	0	1	77	50	+27	9	Qualified for 2019 IKF World Korfball Championship as hosts
2	Zimbabwe (Q)	4	3	0	0	1	80	44	+36	9	Qualified for 2019 IKF World Korfball Championship
3	Zambia (E)	4	0	0	0	4	28	91	−63	0	

Updated to match(es) played on 29 April 2018. Source:
(E) Eliminated; (Q) Qualified to the phase indicated

Team 1	Score	Team 2
Zimbabwe	19−5	Zambia
Zimbabwe	16−20	South Africa
Zimbabwe	17−13	South Africa
Zambia	8−22	South Africa
South Africa	22−9	Zambia
Zimbabwe	28−6	Zambia
