= Korfball Premier League =

Professional korfball league in India

- Sport: Korfball
- Founded: 2026
- First season: 2026
- Administrator: Sporty Bharat and Entertainment Private Limited
- No. of teams: 8 (inaugural)
- Country: India

The Korfball Premier League (KPL) is a professional korfball league based in India, launched in April 2026. It is co-organised by Sporty Bharat and Entertainment Private Limited and Game Changers FZCO, with the Korfball Federation of India (KFI) and the Foreign Correspondents' Club of South Asia as supporting partners. The inaugural season, scheduled for September 2026, features eight franchise teams with 112 players — 62 Indian and 50 international players from more than 20 countries — competing for a prize pool of ₹31 lakh for the winning team and ₹11 lakh for the runner-up.

== Background ==
=== Korfball ===
Korfball is a mixed-gender ball sport with structural similarities to basketball, handball, and netball. The sport was invented in Amsterdam, the Netherlands, in 1902 by schoolteacher Nico Broekhuysen. Each team consists of fourteen players — seven men and seven women — with eight players (four men and four women) on the court at any one time and the remaining six available as substitutes. The objective is to score by throwing the ball through a netless basket known as a korf, mounted on a pole 3.5 metres above the ground. Players are permitted to defend only opponents of the same gender. Physical contact between players is not permitted.

The International Korfball Federation (IKF), founded in 1933, governs the sport at international level. Korfball has been included in the World Games since 1985.

=== Korfball in India ===
Korfball was introduced in India in 1979 by Ashok Kumar, a founder member of the Korfball Federation of India. India affiliated with the IKF in 1980. The sport is recognised by the Union Ministry for Youth Affairs and Sports, Government of India.

In 1995, India hosted the 5th IKF World Korfball Championship at the Indira Gandhi Indoor Stadium, New Delhi — the first edition held outside Europe. India has finished third at the Asia-Oceania Korfball Championship on two occasions, in 2002 and 2006. As of 2026, the sport is organised across 26 states, each administered by a state association.

The Korfball Federation of India was suspended by the IKF General Meeting in November 2015. The suspension was lifted on 12 April 2022 following governance reforms.

== History ==
=== Foundation ===
The Korfball Premier League was co-founded by Gagandeep Handa, Amandeep Singh, Chandan Kumar, Pankaj Kumar, and Zaara Gadhok. The league is operated by Sporty Bharat and Entertainment Private Limited in collaboration with Game Changers FZCO. The Korfball Federation of India and the Foreign Correspondents' Club of South Asia are institutional partners.

=== Launch (April 2026) ===
A press release announcing the league was issued on 3 April 2026 and distributed through ANI. It was reported by The Tribune, Lokmat Times, Jaipur Times, and Editorji.

The official launch ceremony was held on 10 April 2026 at the Shangri-La Eros hotel, New Delhi. Those present included:

- Dr. Wael S.H. Awwad, President of the Foreign Correspondents' Club of South Asia
- Himanshu Mishra, President of the Korfball Federation of India
- Nidhi Shekhawat, Vice-President of the KFI and former national player
- Vinod Kumar, Treasurer of the KFI and former national player
- Natasha, KFI Executive Committee member and former international player
- Ashok Kumar, founder member of the Korfball Federation of India

Indian national team players who attended included former captain Nitesh, Rajat Kumar Saini, Suraj Sharma, Alisha, Taniska Gurjar, and Yuri Sethi.

The IKF published a report on the launch on 14 April 2026 on its official website.

== Format ==
=== Teams and players ===
The inaugural season, scheduled for September 2026, comprises eight franchise teams. A total of 112 players have been registered — 62 Indian and 50 international players drawn from more than 20 countries. Indian players confirmed for the season include Yamini Dehloo, Alisha, Yuri Sethi, Sarang Sharma, Sourbh Dalal, and Rajat Kumar Saini.

=== Rules ===
Matches are played under the standard rules of the International Korfball Federation:

- Each team fields eight players: four men and four women, across two court zones
- Players may defend only opponents of the same gender
- A goal is scored by throwing the ball through the opposing team's korf
- After every two goals are scored, teams rotate zones
- Physical contact is not permitted

=== Prize money ===
The inaugural season carries a prize pool of ₹31 lakh for the winning team and ₹11 lakh for the runner-up.

== Organisation ==
The league is managed by Sporty Bharat and Entertainment Private Limited in collaboration with Game Changers FZCO. Sporty Bharat's stated activities include league management, event management, brand partnerships, media production, and athlete development. The Korfball Federation of India, affiliated with the International Korfball Federation, and the Foreign Correspondents' Club of South Asia are listed as supporting partners.

== See also ==
- Korfball
- Korfball in India
- India national korfball team
- Korfball Federation of India
- International Korfball Federation
- 1995 Korfball World Championship
