= Zambia national korfball team =

Zambia
- Association: Korfball Federation of Zambia (KFZ)
- IKF membership: 2011
- IKF code: ZAM (Zambia)
- IKF rank: 37 (Nov.2014)

African Championship
- Appearances: 2
- First appearance: 2014
- Best result: 3rd, 2014, 2018

The Zambia national korfball team is a member of the IKF, managed by the Korfball Federation of Zambia (KFZ), representing Zambia in korfball international competitions.

== Tournament history ==
African Championship
Year	Championship	Host	Classification
2014	3rd African Championship	Zambia	3rd place
2018	4th African Championship	Zimbabwe	3rd place
