= Bennekom =

- Village
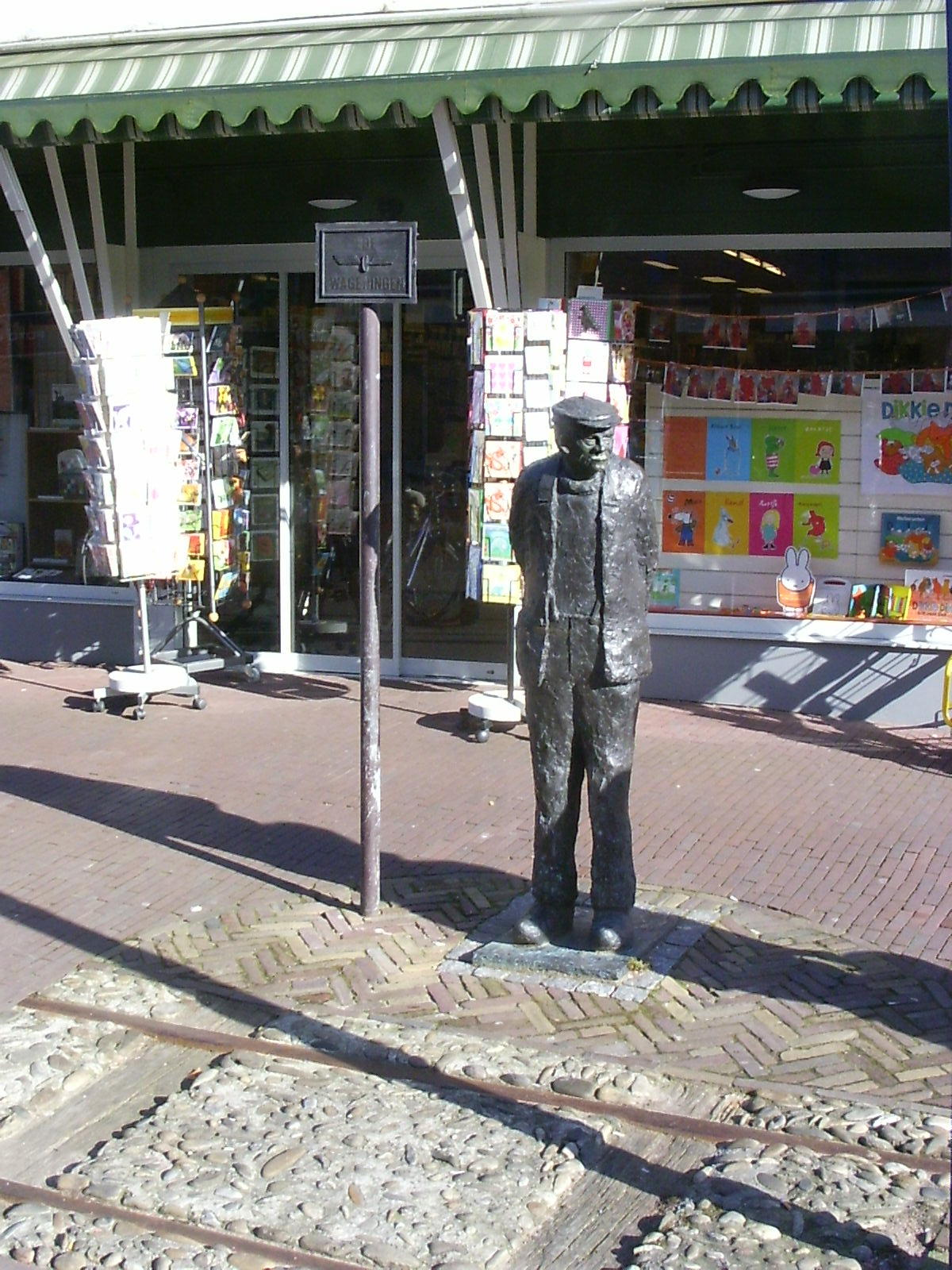
- Statue along the old railwaytrack

- Flag

- Map of Ede with Bennekom highlighted
- Coordinates: 51°59′58″N 5°40′32″E
- Country: Netherlands
- Province: Gelderland
- Municipality: Ede

Population (1 January 2009)
  - Total: 14,740

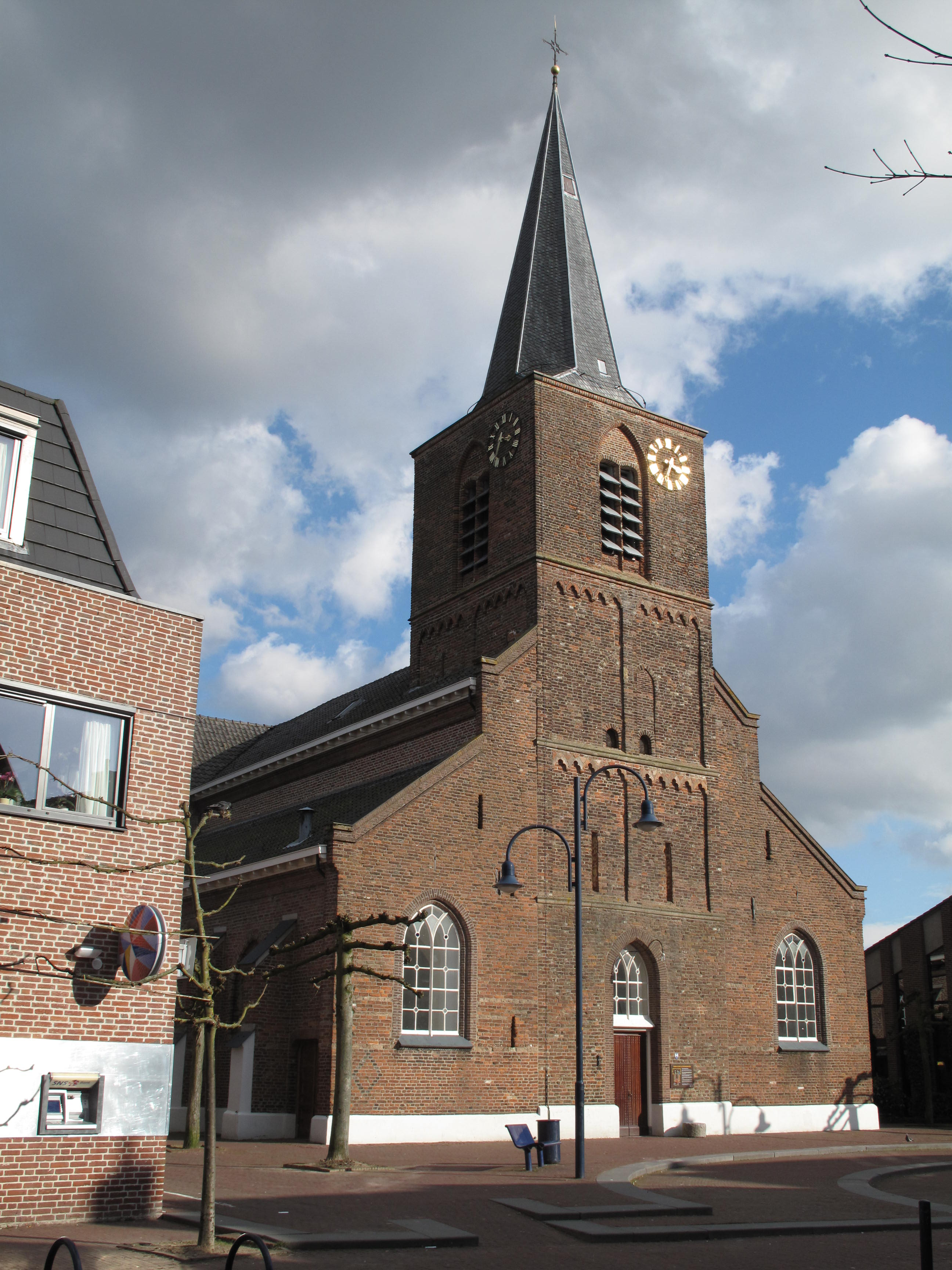
Bennekom, Old Church

Bennekom is a village and parish in the Netherlands, which is part of the Municipality of Ede in the south-west of the Veluwe district of the Province of Gelderland. It adjoins the town of Wageningen on the Lower-Rhine to the south, and Ede to the north, Veenendaal to the west and Renkum to the east. The western boundary of the parish follows the canalized River Grift and is also the boundary with the Province of Utrecht.

The earliest forms of the name are Beringhem (1288) and Berinchem (1296), meaning the settlement of the people of Bero, who probably lived around the 6th to 10th century.

== Geography ==
The low flat marshy area between the village and the Grift, called the Binnenveld, represents the path of a glacier in the last Ice Age. It forms part of the Gelder Valley, which runs from the Lower Rhine between Wageningen and Rhenen (Province of Utrecht) and the IJsselmeer near Amersfoort. The marshes west of Bennekom village were drained about the 13th century. Much of the peat has been removed, leaving areas of clay soil. The area is watered by artesian springs from higher ground to the east of the village. The main drainage brooks are the Nergenase Beek and the Hoekelumse Beek. The ancient farmsteads in the Binnenveld and the hamlet of the Kraats stand on higher areas, the remains of dunes blown there at the end of the Ice Age.

The higher ground to the east of the village is sandy and stony moraine pushed aside by the glacier. These less fertile soils are covered with birch and pine forest, heathland, and some arable land suitable for less demanding crops such as oats and maize.

The village stands on an ancient north–south trade route, which follows the 15 m contour. Just west of the village runs the north–south N781 highway, linking Wageningen to Ede and to the A12 motorway, which provides easy access to Holland in the west and Germany in the east. The A12 was built for strategic reasons during World War II and the N781 was constructed after the war. Wageningen has the largest inland port in the Netherlands, providing supplies that pass through Bennekom for the farming industry in the Veluwe. The A12 now partly forms the border between Bennekom parish and the town of Ede. North of the motorway, the estate of Hoekelum falls under Bennekom.

The village also has good access to the railway between Utrecht and Arnhem (both 15–20 minutes away) with the station Ede-Wageningen at the southern edge of Ede. The bus service 86 runs from Arnhem via Wageningen and Bennekom to the railway station. Until the 1960s, a steam tramway from the railway station ran to Wageningen through the centre of Bennekom, carrying both passengers and goods.

South-east of the village in the forested area is a post-war development, Wageningen-Hoog, with large villas and extensive grounds. South of the village, the green belt separating Bennekom from the built-up area of Wageningen is only a few hundred metres wide.

== Public services ==
The parish has seven primary schools: the St Alexander School (Roman Catholic); the Juliana School, the Wilhelmina School; the Eben-Haëzer School; the Wingerd School; the School with the Bible in the Kraats (all Protestant); the Prinsenakker School (undenominational). The village has no secondary schools.

There are seven churches, several reflecting various shades of Dutch Calvinism in their origin. There is a sports facility, the Eikelhof with korfball club DVO and one of the largest amateur soccer clubs in the Netherlands, VV Bennekom, and a large indoor sports hall. The village also has an outdoor swimming pool, the Vrije Slag, and a tennis complex, Keltenwoud. The village has a branch of the Municipal public library, a music school, a centre for indoor hobbies and a medical centre housing the practices of several doctors, a physiotherapist and a pharmacist.

Bennekom has a hospice and three old-people's homes: Beringhem, Timanshof and Aleidahof. There are two nursing homes: Halderhof for those with physical handicaps; Breukelderhof for those with mental handicaps. The Broek-Akker acts as a service centre for work with old people.

== St Alexander’s Church ==
The village has grown up around the ancient Church of St Alexander, also known as the Old Church. Old roads too are focused on it.

During a major restoration in 2006–2007, tuffstone foundations with a type of mortar used up to the 11th century came to light. That and various associations suggest that the church was founded about 1015, thus being the oldest in the municipality. The legend of St Alexander to which the church of Bennekom was consecrated is based on remains from the Cemetery of the Jordani on the Salarian Way in Rome. He and his brothers were martyred in Rome around AD 165. His feast day, along with his brothers, is 10 July. In AD 851, Waltbert, a grandson of the first Christian King of Saxony carried his remains from Rome to the Abbey of Wildeshausen south of Bremen. The chronicle of that event written by a monk of Fulda tells of miracles of healing along the route. Churches along that route are dedicated to St Alexander but Bennekom is the only such in the Netherlands. That can be attributed to Meinwerk (ca 975–1036), who was Bishop of Paderborn (1009–1036). Meinwerk was born at Renkum as son of Immed, Count of Renkum, and Adela of Hamaland (also called Adela of Renkum) about 975, who owned the estate of Nergena in Bennekom. Shortly after his consecration, Meinwerk fell ill of the plague. He attributed his miraculous cure.to St Alexander and built the Church of St ‘Alexis’ in Paderborn in his honour. He may have founded the church of Bennekom at that same time.

Among the many rebuildings and restorations since that time, the main ones were in 1541–1542 when the side aisles were added and 1857 when the transepts were added.

The heads of the pillars built in 1541–1542 have unique carvings, one giving the date mdxlii (1542) and the others giving stages of the work on the church from the architect's plans to the reconsecration of the completed church. The benefactor responsible for the work was Arent, son of Udo, toe Boecop, died 1548, who is commemorated in the first of four tombstones to the Toe Boecop family of Harslo Castle in the south aisle.

== Archaeology and history ==
Near the village are several burial mounds (tumuli) dating from the Middle Bronze Age. In 2006, an archaeological survey in the grounds of the former Bennekom hospital just south of the A12 motorway brought to light the remains of a farmstead and granary dating from the Early Iron Age about 800–500 BC. Within and near the village were also the remains of a settlement from the Iron Age. West of the centre were traces of a farming settlement from the 2nd to 5th century.

Reclamation of the marshes west of the village probably began in the 11th century. A route across the marshes is reflected in the name of a farmstead, Bruxvoord, ‘Bridge Ford’.

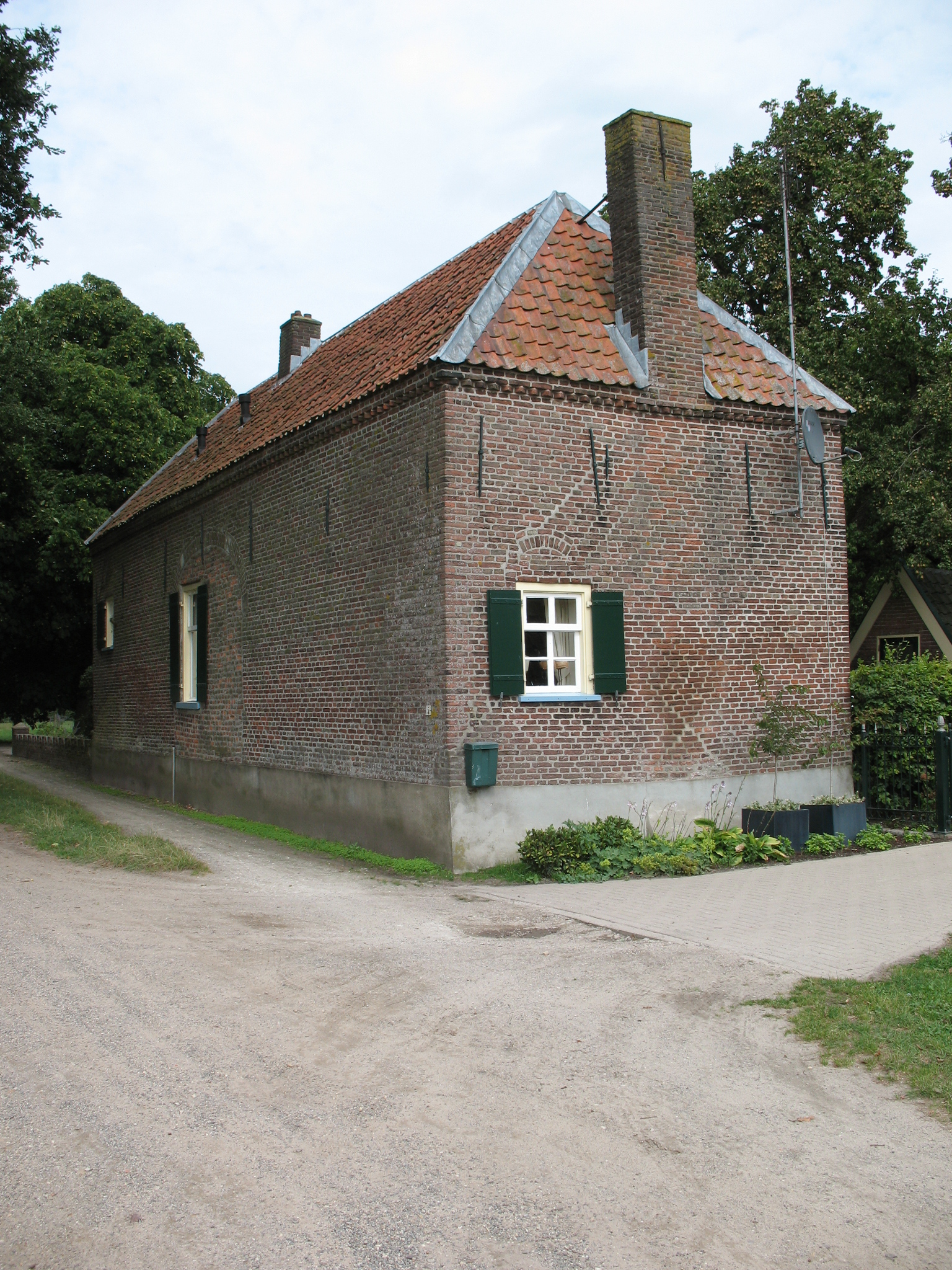
Gate of Castle Harsselo

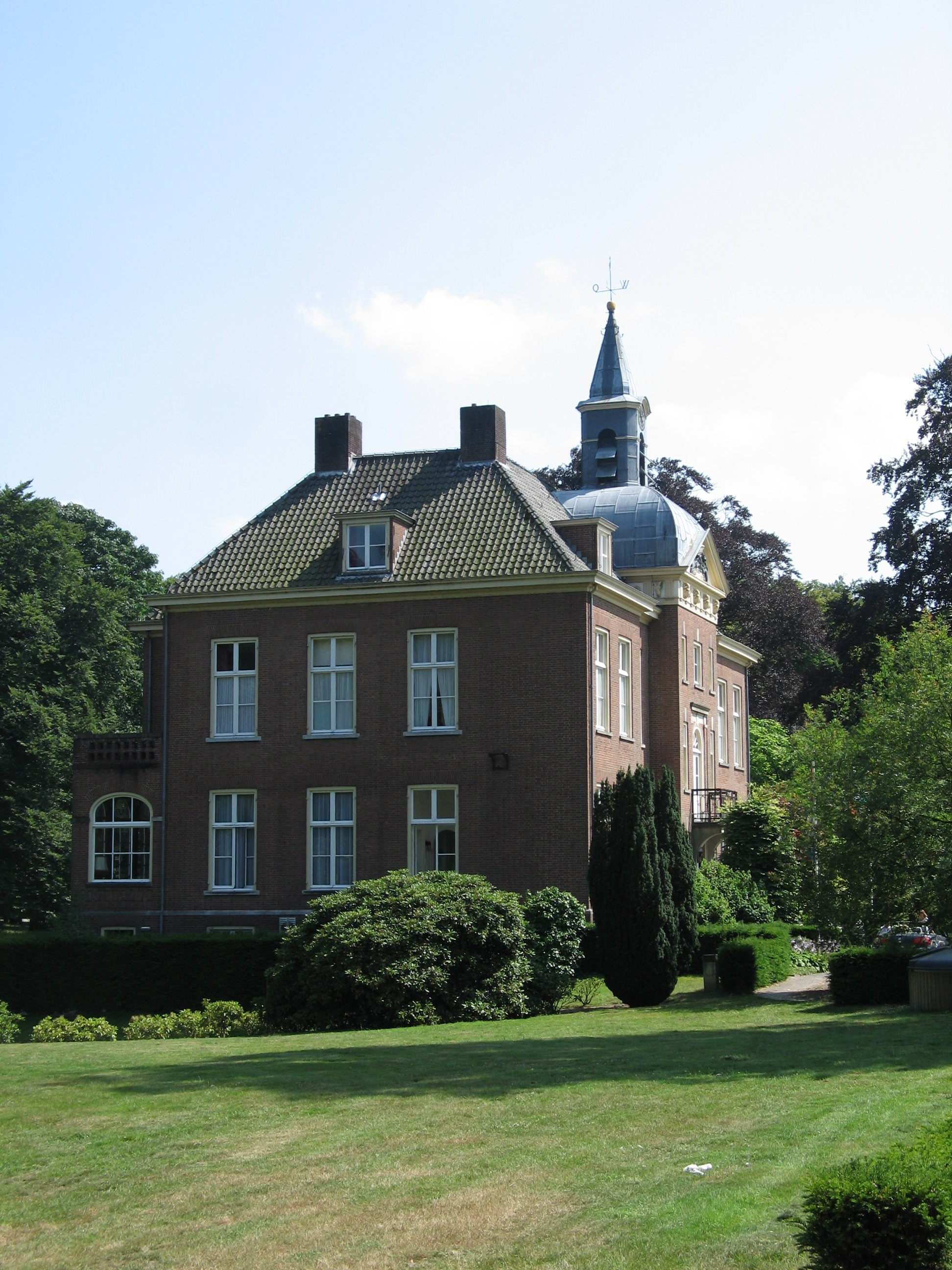
Castle Hoekelum

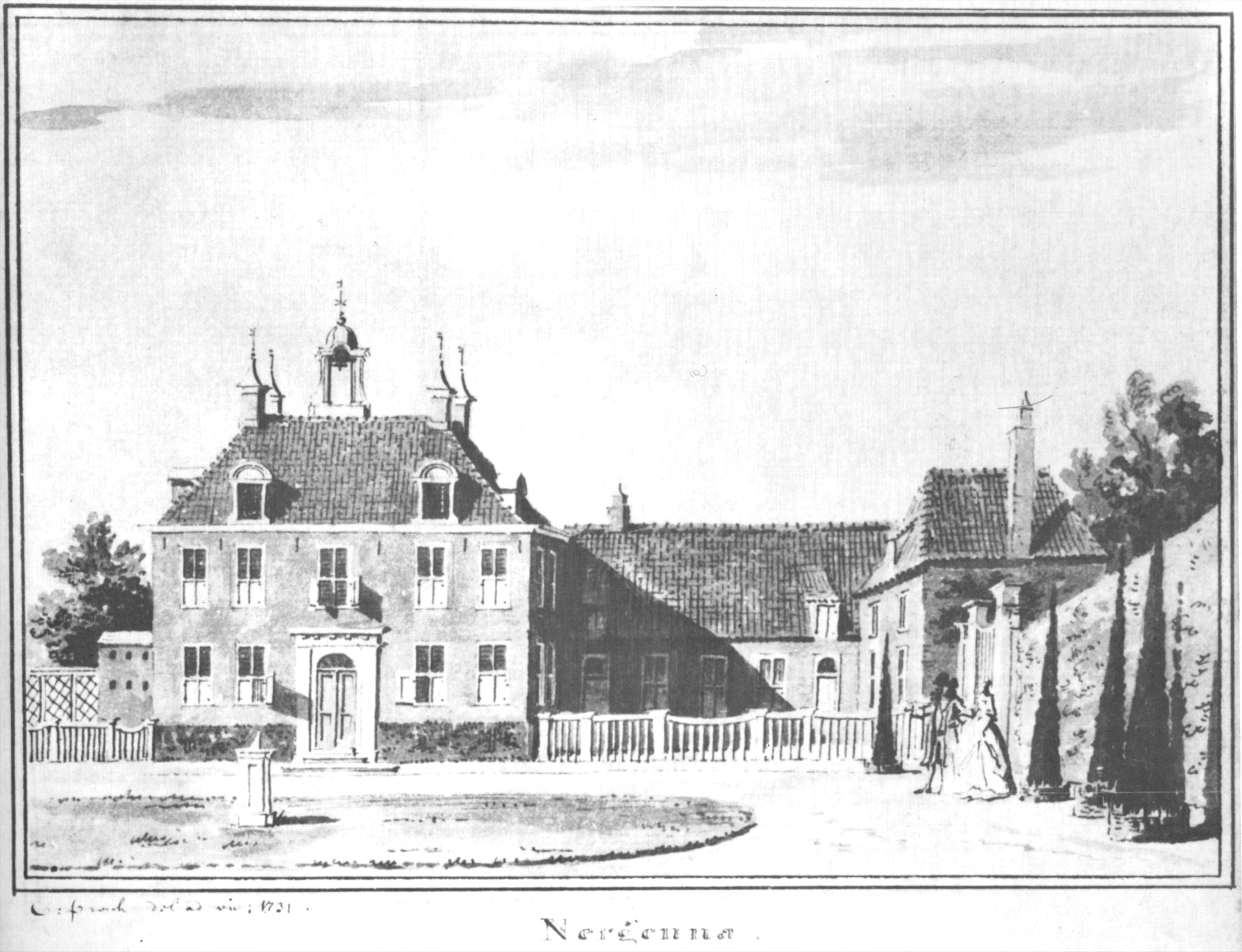
Castle Nergena 1731

In the Middle Ages, Bennekom had four castles or fortified farmsteads: Harslo Castle about 2 km (1 mi) west of the village; Nergena Castle just west of highway N781; Hoekelum Castle north of motorway A12; and the Ham north-west of the village.

Harslo and the Ham guarded routes across the marshes between the Duchy of Guelderland and the Bishopric of Utrecht, which were sometimes at war. Both are now farms, and only the gatehouse of Harslo Castle remains. The Netherlands Institute for Varietal Testing of Arable Crops was built in 1952 on the site of Nergena in the style of the country house that succeeded to the castle. Hoekelum remains as a moated country house. The grounds are used for various events including Bennekom's gymkhana on Ascension Day.

During Napoleonic times (1811–1817), Bennekom became an independent municipality with its office in the back of the church, which remained partitioned off, later as a library, until the restoration of 2006. At that time, church towers were appropriated by the civil municipality and so remain. The civil power is responsible for maintenance of the tower clock, the tower and the church bells. A bell rings at midday, an echo of the Pre-Reformation Angelus for midday prayer. A bell rings too while funerals process from one of the churches to the graveyard. Until the 19th century, Bennekom remained a farming village. With the railway station of Ede-Wageningen (1845) and the steam tram from there to Bennekom and Wageningen (1883), the village became a tourist resort with several hotels and many guest houses.

In 1887, many of the church council and congregation followed the minister, the Rev. E. Eisma in the ‘Doleantie’ movement, which gave rise to the Reformed Churches in the Netherlands. They rejected the authority of the synod, which dispatched a loyal minister, the Rev. K.F. Kreuzberg, from Arnhem for the service on 27 February, causing tumult in the church. The same happened on 5 June but Eisma had already begun his service. On 19 June, the militia was called to the village to keep from the church the followers of Eisma, who then held his service in the open air. The census of 1891 shows that 56,6% of the population had moved to the Reformed Churches and 41% remained loyal to the Netherlands Reformed Church.

== History ==
=== World War II ===
Bennekom was occupied by Nazi troops on the first day of invasion, 10 May 1940. For the following days, the village was in the front line between those troops and Dutch forces on the higher land west of the Grift between Rhenen and Veenendaal. The first casualties on 10 May were Gerritje E. Joosten and E.J. Westerik. The next day, four civilians were killed and two fatally injured by stray artillery fire from the Grebbeberg, the hill at Rhenen. Among the Dutch forces defending the Grebbeberg, J.H. van Dijk of Bennekom was killed on 13 May. The country capitulated on 15 May.

During the following years, many Jews sheltered in Bennekom. About two-thirds of them survived the War; the others were mostly slaughtered in Sobibor and Auschwitz. As the war progressed and repression increased, the Underground became increasingly active and were sometimes shot. Several Allied aircraft were shot down in the parish and a German transport plane with about 10 crew crashed at Hoekelum on 4 December 1943.

On 30 December 1942, the two bells of the Old Church were confiscated and removed for melting down. One of them was on a boat sabotaged and sunk by the resistance, and was recovered after the War. A new one was cast in 1949 to replace the stolen one.

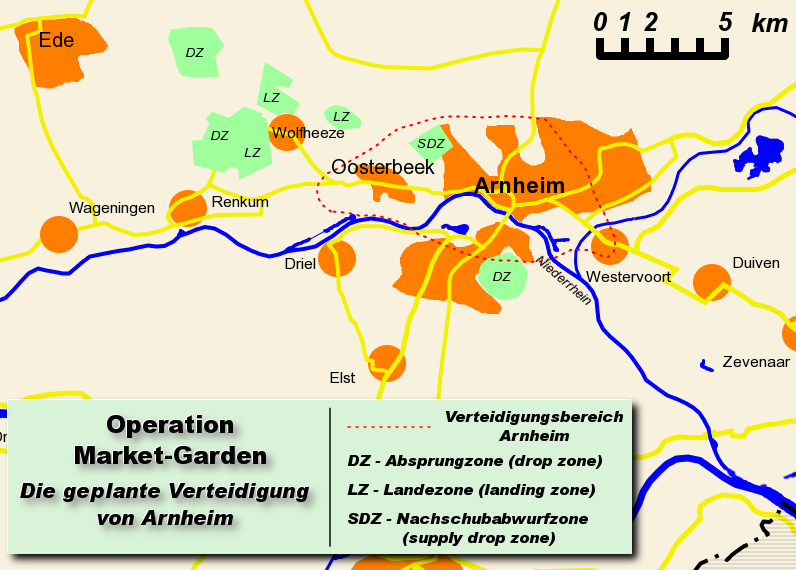
Operation Market Garden

On Sunday 17 September 1944, two Bennekommers were among the 57 civilians killed by Allied bombs that were intended for the barracks east of Ede but fell in the built-up area of Ede near the railway. The fighting after the Airborne landings that afternoon stretched into the forest on the edge of Bennekom parish. Several Allied aircraft crashed near Bennekom village. During the subsequent escape of Allied forces, several members of the Bennekom underground led some of the Allies to liberated territory across the Rhine; some lost their lives during the attempts.

After the liberation of the area south of the Rhine and Waal, Bennekom again became front line with intensive Allied artillery fire from south of the Waal against German positions around Bennekom. On 21 October, the village was evacuated and became Sperrgebiet, ‘forbidden territory’ except for slaves and forced labour working on the German defences. Besides buildings destroyed by Allied artillery, the German forces destroyed many properties on the edge of the village to clear their line of fire. On 23 November 1944, a munitions depot in Bennekom's windmill blew up, killing about 100 German troops and destroying properties in the area. The German casualties were buried in the village cemetery but exhumed and transferred to the general German cemetery in the Province of North Brabant after the War. A stray V-1 rocket exploded in the village in 1945.

On the night of 8/9 March the RAF dropped weapons close to Lunteren. Seventeen participants of the resistance were captured and executed two weeks later. Of the victims, five came from Bennekom: Maarten H. Lugthart; Jan Mekking; Peter Roseboom; Lambertus (Bart) van Elst (all executed at Amersfoort); Hylke van Vliet (executed at Loosdrecht).

The empty village was ‘liberated’ by Canadian and British troops on 17 April 1945 but remained front line until the surrender of German forces in the Provinces of Utrecht, and North and South Holland on 6 May 1945. However, Dutch SS around Veenendaal continued to fight in the area until 9 May. They shot two members of the Gloucestershire Regiment in the west of the parish on 22 April. Evacuees started to return to the devastated village on 12 May.

In the summer of 1945, Canadian forces erected a monument to the Bennekom casualties of the massacre in March 1945 and some other members of the Underground in a small park at the south end of the village street, now called Bart van Elst Park.

Every year, on the Dutch national Remembrance Day, 4 May, a procession of local residents silently walks through the town towards the monument, where wreaths are laid, the Dutch National Anthem is sung and a two-minute silence is held for these and other victims of the Second World War.

=== Modern history ===
Bennekom has 4,745 home-owned dwellings and 1,131 rented dwellings. It remains a pleasant but rather expensive place for working people to live and for retiring people. Since the 1980s, several low-rise blocks of flats have been built. The village provides work for 4 221 people in shops in the village centre, various offices, in welfare, agriculture and small industries. Many residents work or used to work in the Agricultural University and agricultural research institutions in Wageningen. Bennekom itself provides little employment in industry and commerce. Many work in Ede or use the railway or motorway to reach work, especially in the Holland conurbation.

Since 2006, the Opella foundation has been redeveloping the area of the former Bennekom Hospital as the Baron van Wassenaarpark, named after the former owners of the Hoekelum estate, who gave their land south of the A12 motorway for the hospital. It will rehouse welfare services: the hospice, Berinchem, Halderhof and Breukelderhof old-people's homes There will also be owner-occupied and rented flats. The first accommodation will be available in 2010 or 2011.

== Notable people ==
- Bert de Vries (born Groningen 1938), former leader of the parliamentary fraction of the Christian Democratic Appeal, Minister of Social Affairs 1989–1994, briefly Minister of Agriculture, Environmental Management and Fisheries 1990.
- Wopke Hoekstra (born Bennekom 1975), former Minister of Financial affairs 2017–2022.
