= Aruba national korfball team =

Aruba
- Association: Korfball Bond Aruba (KBA)
- IKF membership: 1982
- IKF code: ARU (Aruba)
- IKF rank: 50 (Dec. 2015)

World Championships
- Appearances: 2
- First appearance: 1987
- Best result: 8th place, 1987

The Aruba national korfball team is managed by the Korfball Bond Aruba (KBA), representing Aruba in korfball international competitions.

== Tournament history ==
World Championships
Year	Championship	Host	Classification
1987	3rd World Championship	Makkum (The Netherlands)	8th place
1991	4th World Championship	Antwerp (Belgium)	10th place
