= Malawi national korfball team =

Malawi
- Association: Malawi Korfball Association (MKA)
- IKF membership: 2006
- IKF code: MWI (Malawi)
- IKF rank: 41 (Nov.2014)

African Championship
- Appearances: 1
- First appearance: 2014
- Best result: 2014 (4th Place)

The Malawi national korfball team is managed by the Malawi Korfball Association (MKA), representing Malawi in korfball international competitions.

== Tournament history ==
African Championship
Year	Championship	Host	Classification
2014	3rd African Championship	Zambia	4th place
