= Pakistan Korfball Federation =

Governing body of korfball in Pakistan

The Pakistan Korfball Federation (PKF) is the national sports governing body to develop and promote sport of Korfball in Pakistan.

The federation is affiliated with International Korfball Federation

== See also ==
- Pakistan national korfball team
