= Korfball at the World Games =

Sport at the World Games

Korfball was introduced as a World Games sport at the 1985 World Games in London.

== Medalists ==
=== Mixed ===
Games	Gold	Silver	Bronze
1985 London	Netherlands	Belgium	United States
1989 Karlsruhe	Netherlands	Belgium	West Germany
1993 The Hague	Netherlands	Belgium	Germany
1997 Lahti	Netherlands	Belgium	Chinese Taipei
2001 Akita	Netherlands	Belgium	Chinese Taipei
2005 Duisberg	Netherlands	Belgium	Czech Republic
2009 Kaohsiung	Netherlands	Belgium	Chinese Taipei
2013 Cali	Netherlands	Belgium	Chinese Taipei
2017 Wrocław	Netherlands	Chinese Taipei	Belgium
2022 Birmingham	Netherlands	Belgium	Chinese Taipei
2025 Chengdu	Netherlands	Belgium	Chinese Taipei
