= Argentina national korfball team =

Argentina
- Association: Asociación de Korfball Argentina (AKA)
- IKF membership: 2007
- IKF code: ARG (Argentina)
- IKF rank: 50 (Dec. 2015)

The Argentina national korfball team formed in 2011 is managed by the Asociación de Korfball Argentina (AKA) representing Argentina in korfball international competitions.

== Tournament History ==
Argentina were scheduled to compete in the First Pan-American Korfball Championship, but withdrew from the final competition due to financial reasons and were subsequently replaced by a second Brazil team who played their matches out of the Championship.
