= United States Korfball Federation =

Governing body of korfball in the United States

- Sport: Korfball
- Abbreviation: USKF
- Founded: 1978
- Affiliation: International Korfball Federation
- Affiliation date: 1978
- President: Judith Dea
- Secretary: Carl Yerger
- Coach: Dankmar Caderius van Veen

Official website
- www.uskorfball.org
- (United States)

United States Korfball Federation, also simply known as the USKF, is the governing body for the sport of korfball in the USA. Formed in 1978, it is the association of korfball responsible for overseeing all aspects of the sport in the USA.

Korfball in the USA has had media coverage in the past and was previously an Olympic sport.

== See also ==
- United States national korfball team
