= Pakistan national korfball team =

Pakistan
- Association: Pakistan Korfball Federation
- IKF membership: 2008
- IKF code: PAK (Pakistan)
- IKF rank: 33 (Dec.2011)

Asia-Oceania Championship
- Appearances: 1
- First appearance: 2010
- Best result: Champions, 8th place

Asia Championship
- Appearances: 1
- First appearance: 2008
- Best result: 5th place

The Pakistan national korfball team is managed by the Pakistan Korfball Federation (PKF), representing Pakistan in korfball international competitions.

Their international debut in a competition was in the 2008 Asia Championship.

== Tournament history ==
Asia-Oceania Championships
Year	Championship	Host	Classification
2010	8th Asia-Oceania Championship	China	8th place

Asia Championships
Year	Championship	Host	Classification
2008	2nd Asian Championship	Jaipur (India)	5th place
