= South Africa national korfball team =

National sports team

South Africa
- Association: South African Korfball Federation
- IKF membership: 1993
- IKF code: RSA (South Africa)
- IKF rank: 28 (Nov. 2025)

World Championships
- Appearances: 8
- First appearance: 1995
- Best result: 10th, 1999

African Championships
- Appearances: 4
- First appearance: 2006
- Best result: Champions, 2006, 2010, 2014, 2018
- https://www.webcitation.org/5ko2BfEgK?url=http://www.geocities.com/sakorfballfederation/index.html

The South Africa national korfball team is managed by the South African Korfball Federation (SAKF), representing South Africa in korfball international competitions.

In 2014 they won their third African Championship, held in Zambia.

== Tournament history ==
World Championships
Year	Championship	Host	Classification
1995	5th World Championship	New Delhi (India)	11th place
1999	6th World Championship	Adelaide (Australia)	10th place
2003	7th World Championship	Rotterdam (The Netherlands)	11th place
2007	8th World Championship	Brno (Czech Republic)	15th place
2011	9th World Championship	Shaoxing (China)	16th place
2015	10th World Championship	Antwerp, Ghent & Tielen (Belgium)	15th place
2019	11th World Championship	Durban (South Africa)	19th place
2023	11th World Championship	Taipei (Taiwan)	23rd place

African Championship
Year	Championship	Host	Classification
2006	1st African Championship	South Africa	Champions
2010	2nd African Championship	Zimbabwe	Champions
2014	3rd African Championship	Zambia	Champions
2018	4th African Championship	Zimbabwe	Champions

== Current squad ==
National team in the 2011 World Championships

- Elsandri Van Niekerk
- Elsie Theyse
- Liandri Theyse
- Trizeldi van der Westhuizen
- Christie Theyse
- Clarissa Nel
- Nomphelo Stuurman
- Dinilesizwe Madikwa
- Etienne Stander
- Jean Pierre Jacobs
- Rudolph Francios van Niekerk
- Theunis de Bruin
- Charl Pinches
- Jean-Pierre Cassel
- Werner Basson
- Coach: Gertjie Theyse

National team in the 2007 World Championships

- Elsandri Van Niekerk
- Heloise Peusschers
- Elsie Theyse
- Heleen Bennetts
- Sonja Greyling
- Liandri Theyse
- Wilma Oosthuizen
- Werner Basson
- Johan Vermeulen
- Luther Grobler
- Ettienne Potgieter
- George Mwale
- Jean Pierre Jacobs
- Ettienne Stander
- Coach: Gertjie Theyse
