= Zimbabwe national korfball team =

National sports team

Zimbabwe
- Association: Zimbabwe Korfball Federation (ZKF)
- IKF membership: 2005
- IKF code: ZIM (Zimbabwe)
- IKF rank: 28

African Championship
- Appearances: 5
- First appearance: 2006
- Best result: 2022 (1st Place)

The Zimbabwe national korfball team is managed by the Zimbabwe Korfball Federation (ZKF), representing Zimbabwe in korfball international competitions.

== Tournament history ==
African Championship
| Year | Championship | Host | Classification |
| 2006 | 1st African Championship | South Africa | 2nd place |
| 2010 | 2nd African Championship | Zimbabwe | 2nd place |
| 2014 | 3rd African Championship | Zambia | 2nd place |
| 2018 | 2018 All-Africa Korfball Championship | Zimbabwe | 2nd place |
| 2022 | 2022 All-Africa Korfball Championship | Zambia | 1st place |
