= United States national korfball team =

USA
- Association: United States Korfball Federation
- IKF membership: 1978
- IKF code: USA (United States)
- IKF rank: 40 (Nov.2014)

World Championships
- Appearances: 5
- First appearance: 1978
- Best result: 5th, 1978

World Games
- Appearances: 3
- First appearance: 1985
- Best result: 3rd, 1985
- http://www.uskorfball.org/

The United States national korfball team is managed by the United States Korfball Federation (USKF), representing the United States in korfball international competitions.

In 2006, Canada, along with the USA formed North America to compete in the Commonwealth and Friends Korfball Championship. Finishing 6th out of 7.

== Tournament history ==
World Championships
Year	Championship	Host	Classification
1978	1st World Championship	Amsterdam (The Netherlands)	5th place
1984	2nd World Championship	Antwerp (Belgium)	6th place
1987	3rd World Championship	Makkum (The Netherlands)	7th place
1991	4th World Championship	Antwerp (Belgium)	7th place
2007	8th World Championship	Brno (Czech Republic)	13th place

World Games
Year	Championship	Host	Classification
1985	2nd World Games	London (England)	3rd place
1989	3rd World Games	Karlsruhe (Germany)	5th place
1993	4th World Games	The Hague (Netherlands)	5th place

== Previous squad ==
National team in the World Championship 2007:

- Amanda Guijarro
- Effie VanDyke
- Allison Watchorn
- Kate Madison
- Erika Guijarro
- Aaron Kenemer
- David Warren
- Antoine Williams
- Gerado Ruffino
- Steve Malvitz
- Chris Olds
- Julie McGowan
- Mark Slotman
- Coach: Ronald Buis
