= IKF World Korfball Ranking =

Ranking for national korfball teams

The IKF World Korfball Ranking is the ranking for national korfball teams, done by the International Korfball Federation.

== World Korfball Ranking ==
2026 IKF World Korfball Ranking
Rankings as of August 2026
1	Steady	Netherlands	543.000
2	Steady	Belgium	492.098
3	Steady	Chinese Taipei	449.410
4	Steady	Germany	313.696
5	▲1	Catalonia	291.877
6	▲1	Portugal	261.844
7	▲4	New Zealand	249.642
8	▼3	Czech Republic	221.559
9	▲6	England	199.922
10	▲3	Turkey	199.195
11	▲1	Malaysia	193.893
12	▼3	Hong Kong	191.509
13	▲1	China	174.749
14	▼4	Australia	160.675
15	▼7	Suriname	157.567
16	▲1	Thailand	153.070
17	▼1	India	115.746
18	▲3	Japan	102.227
19	▼1	Hungary	95.353
20	▼1	Poland	90.118
21	▼1	Slovakia	82.141
22	Steady	Ireland	57.039
23	▲2	Macau	40.045
24	Steady	Wales	38.730
25	▼1	Switzerland	38.176
26	▼3	Brazil	36.683
27	▼1	Serbia	36.441
28	▲3	Scotland	29.637
29	Steady	France	29.333
30	▼2	South Africa	28.067
31	▲1	Greece	23.833
32	▼2	Philippines	20.558
33	Steady	Zimbabwe	18.600
34	▲1	Morocco	17.600
35	▼1	Indonesia	16.383
36	Steady	Ivory Coast	13.400
37	Steady	Armenia	11.069
38	Steady	Singapore	10.961
39	Steady	Argentina	10.467
40	Steady	Zambia	10.200
41	Steady	Ukraine	9.667
42	▲1	Sweden	8.000
43	▼1	South Korea	7.947
44	Steady	Ghana	7.200
45	Steady	United States	7.000
46	Steady	Cameroon	6.00
46=	Steady	Kenya	6.00
46=	Steady	Malawi	6.00
46=	Steady	Sri Lanka	6.00
50	Steady	Egypt	4.00
50=	Steady	Uganda	4.00
50=	Steady	DR Congo	4.00
53	Steady	Aruba	3.00
53=	Steady	Bosnia and Herzegovina	3.00
53=	Steady	Botswana	3.00
53=	Steady	Bulgaria	3.00
53=	Steady	Canada	3.00
53=	Steady	Colombia	3.00
53=	Steady	Costa Rica	3.00
53=	Steady	Croatia	3.00
53=	Steady	Curaçao	3.00
53=	Steady	Dominican Republic	3.00
53=	Steady	Finland	3.00
53=	Steady	Georgia	3.00
53=	Steady	Italy	3.00
53=	Steady	Luxembourg	3.00
53=	Steady	Nepal	3.00
53=	Steady	Romania	3.00
53=	Steady	Russia	3.00
53=	Steady	Guinea	3.00
67	Steady	Peru	2.00
72	Steady	Mexico	1.00
72=	Steady	São Tomé and Príncipe	1.00
72=	Steady	Venezuela	1.00

2025 IKF World Korfball Ranking
Rankings as of December 2025
1	Steady	Netherlands	607.250
2	Steady	Belgium	544.835
3	Steady	Chinese Taipei	496.123
4	Steady	Germany	354.377
5	Steady	Czech Republic	322.588
6	Steady	Catalonia	294.087
7	Steady	Portugal	254.569
8	Steady	Suriname	236.733
9	Steady	Hong Kong	225.665
10	Steady	Australia	218.971
11	Steady	New Zealand	217.033
12	Steady	Malaysia	203.642
13	Steady	Turkey	200.490
14	Steady	China	192.538
15	Steady	England	180.882
16	▲1	India	157.638
17	▼1	Thailand	155.944
18	Steady	Hungary	147.363
19	Steady	Poland	133.343
20	Steady	Slovakia	121.368
21	Steady	Japan	115.331
22	Steady	Ireland	88.059
23	Steady	Brazil	55.433
24	Steady	Switzerland	53.765
25	Steady	Macau	53.042
26	Steady	Serbia	51.412
27	Steady	Wales	47.304
28	Steady	South Africa	44.733
29	Steady	France	37.667
30	Steady	Philippines	35.142
31	Steady	Scotland	34.539
32	Steady	Greece	32.167
33	▲1	Zimbabwe	18.600
34	▲1	Indonesia	17.844
35	▼2	Morocco	17.600
36	Steady	Ivory Coast	13.400
37	▲1	Armenia	11.686
38	▲2	Singapore	11.448
39	▼2	Argentina	10.467
40	▲2	Zambia	10.200
41	▼2	Ukraine	9.667
42	▲2	South Korea	8.921
43	▼2	Sweden	8.000
44	▼2	Ghana	7.200
45	▲1	United States	7.000
46	Steady	Cameroon	6.00
46=	Steady	Kenya	6.00
46=	Steady	Malawi	6.00
46=	▼1	Sri Lanka	6.00
50	▲18	Egypt	4.00
50=	▲18	Uganda	4.00
50=	▲	DR Congo	4.00
53	▼7	Aruba	3.00
53=	▼7	Bosnia and Herzegovina	3.00
53=	▼7	Botswana	3.00
53=	▼7	Bulgaria	3.00
53=	▼7	Canada	3.00
53=	▼7	Colombia	3.00
53=	▼7	Costa Rica	3.00
53=	▼7	Croatia	3.00
53=	▼7	Curaçao	3.00
53=	▼7	Dominican Republic	3.00
53=	▼7	Finland	3.00
53=	▼7	Georgia	3.00
53=	▼7	Italy	3.00
53=	▼7	Luxembourg	3.00
53=	▼7	Nepal	3.00
53=	▼7	Romania	3.00
53=	▼7	Russia	3.00
53=	▲	Guinea	3.00
67	▼4	Peru	2.00
72	▼4	Mexico	1.00
72=	▼4	São Tomé and Príncipe	1.00
72=	▲	Venezuela	1.00

2024 IKF World Korfball Ranking
Rankings as of January 2024
1	Steady	Netherlands	651.50
2	Steady	Belgium	584.58
3	Steady	Chinese Taipei	483.19
4	Steady	Germany	448.08
5	▲3	Czech Republic	393.50
6	Steady	Portugal	349.00
7	Steady	Suriname	346.12
8	▲1	Catalonia	335.00
9	▲1	England	298.17
10	▲1	Hungary	273.83
11	▲1	Poland	250.67
12	▲3	Hong Kong	226.07
13	▲9	Turkey	225.00
14	Steady	Australia	221.89
15	▲1	Slovakia	210.33
16	▼3	New Zealand	204.88
17	▼12	China	181.65
18	Steady	Ireland	172.17
19	▲8	Thailand	170.35
20	▲3	India	150.60
21	▲7	Malaysia	138.92
22	▼3	Japan	130.87
23	▼3	Brazil	125.80
24	▲5	Switzerland	101.00
25	▲6	Serbia	98.00
26	▼2	South Africa	94.87
27	▼2	France	93.33
28	▲2	Wales	77.50
29	▲5	Greece	73.83
30	▲8	Philippines	71.26
31	▲2	Scotland	65.67
32	▼15	Morocco	49.80
33	▼12	Zimbabwe	40.80
34	▼8	Ivory Coast	31.20
35	▼3	Argentina	28.40
36	▲3	Ukraine	23.00
36=	▲8	Sweden	23.00
38	▲2	Armenia	21.50
39	▼4	Indonesia	19.39
40	▼4	Ghana	15.60
40=	▼4	Zambia	15.60
42	Steady	Singapore	8.46
43	▼2	United States	8.00
44	▲3	Colombia	4.00
45	▲3	Aruba	3.00
45=	▲3	Bosnia and Herzegovina	3.00
45=	▲3	Botswana	3.00
45=	▲3	Bulgaria	3.00
45=	▲3	Cameroon	3.00
45=	▲3	Canada	3.00
45=	▲3	Costa Rica	3.00
45=	▲3	Croatia	3.00
45=	▲3	Curaçao	3.00
45=	▲1	Dominican Republic	3.00
45=	▲3	Finland	3.00
45=	▲3	Georgia	3.00
45=	▲3	Italy	3.00
45=	▲3	South Korea	3.00
45=	▲3	Luxembourg	3.00
45=	Steady	Macau	3.00
45=	▲3	Malawi	3.00
45=	▲3	Nepal	3.00
45=	▲3	Romania	3.00
45=	▲3	Russia	3.00
45=	▼2	Sri Lanka	3.00
66	▲2	Kenya	2.00
67=		Egypt	1.00
67=		Mexico	1.00
67=		Peru	1.00
67=		São Tomé and Príncipe	1.00
67=		Uganda	1.00

2023 IKF World Korfball Ranking
Rankings as of January 2023
1	Steady	Netherlands	388.00
2	Steady	Belgium	340.51
3	Steady	Chinese Taipei	280.46
4	▲1	Germany	271.45
5	▼1	China	219.55
6	Steady	Portugal	185.96
7	▲2	Suriname	172.28
8	▼1	Czech Republic	150.91
9	▲2	Catalonia	143.16
10	▼2	England	126.40
11	▼1	Hungary	124.92
12	Steady	Poland	92.67
13	▲5	New Zealand	85.83
14	▼1	Australia	85.63
15	▼1	Hong Kong	79.48
16	▼1	Slovakia	77.62
17	▲26	Morocco	61.15
18	▼1	Ireland	52.57
19	▼3	Japan	51.05
20	▲1	Brazil	50.10
21	▲1	Zimbabwe	48.15
22	▲7	Turkey	45.55
23	▲24	India	40.34
24	▼5	South Africa	39.35
25	▲1	France	36.58
26	▲17	Ivory Coast	36.10
27	▲7	Thailand	35.45
28	▲13	Malaysia	33.17
29	▲10	Switzerland	32.08
30	▼6	Wales	30.91
31	▲6	Serbia	30.08
32	▼5	Argentina	28.05
33	▼5	Scotland	25.78
34	▼1	Greece	24.28
35	▼3	Indonesia	18.13
36	▲30	Ghana	18.05
36=	▼6	Zambia	18.05
38	▲8	Philippines	11.09
39	▼2	Ukraine	10.74
40	Steady	Armenia	9.80
41	▲6	United States	8.00
42	▲5	Singapore	7.04
43	Steady	Sri Lanka	7.00
44	▼9	Sweden	6.87
45	▼22	Macau	6.13
46	▼26	Dominican Republic	6.00
47	▼22	Colombia	4.00
48	▼1	Aruba	3.00
48=	▼	Bosnia and Herzegovina	3.00
48=	▼1	Botswana	3.00
48=	▼1	Bulgaria	3.00
48=	▲18	Cameroon	3.00
48=	▼1	Canada	3.00
48=	▼6	Costa Rica	3.00
48=	▼1	Croatia	3.00
48=	▼	Curaçao	3.00
48=	▼1	Cyprus	3.00
48=	▼1	Finland	3.00
48=	▼1	Georgia	3.00
48=	▼1	Italy	3.00
48=	▼12	South Korea	3.00
48=	▼1	Luxembourg	3.00
48=	▼1	Malawi	3.00
48=	▼10	Nepal	3.00
48=	▼1	Pakistan	3.00
48=	▼1	Romania	3.00
48=	▼1	Russia	3.00
68	▼2	Kenya	2.00
69	Steady	Peru	1.00

2018 IKF World Korfball Ranking
Rankings as of December 2018
1	Steady	Netherlands	553.91
2	Steady	Chinese Taipei	474.26
3	Steady	Belgium	423.76
4	Steady	China	346.29
5	Steady	Germany	327.04
6	Steady	England	272.10
7	Steady	Czech Republic	262.84
8	Steady	Portugal	258.35
9	▲1	Hungary	210.86
10	▲1	Australia	192.64
11	▼2	Hong Kong	186.74
12	Steady	Catalonia	164.94
13	Steady	Poland	132.59
14	▲1	Dominican Republic	87.21
15	▲1	South Africa	86.22
16	▲1	New Zealand	70.90
17	▲1	Slovakia	70.40
18	▲1	Wales	66.74
19	▲1	France	66.49
20	▲1	Ireland	66.44

2018 IKF World Korfball Ranking
Rankings as of July 2018
1	Steady	Netherlands	492.41
2	Steady	Chinese Taipei	431.49
3	Steady	Belgium	375.63
4	▲1	China	293.48
5	▼1	Germany	264.37
6	Steady	England	223.38
7	Steady	Czech Republic	210.21
8	▲2	Portugal	100.28
9	▲2	Hong Kong	154.94
10	▲4	Hungary	149.39
11	▼3	Australia	122.61
12	▼3	Catalonia	118.56
13	▼1	Poland	93.26
14	▼1	Russia	86.34
15	Steady	Turkey	76.88
16	Steady	France	37.31
17	Steady	Dominican Republic	36.71
18	Steady	South Africa	35.82
19	Steady	Slovakia	30.89
20	Steady	Wales	30.68
21	Steady	India	30.66
22	Steady	Scotland	28.30
23	Steady	Serbia	28.09
24	Steady	Brazil	25.66
25	Steady	New Zealand	21.23
26	Steady	Colombia	20.75
27	Steady	Ireland	20.62
28	Steady	Zimbabwe	18.60
29	Steady	Sweden	12.84
30	Steady	Sri Lanka	12.53
31	Steady	Greece	11.79
32	Steady	Indonesia	11.72
33	Steady	Zambia	10.40
34	Steady	South Korea	9.65
35	Steady	Philippines	8.71
36	Steady	Malaysia	8.48
37=	Steady	Macau	7.64
38	Steady	Malawi	7.20
39=	Steady	Argentina	6.00
39=	Steady	Belarus	6.00
39=	Steady	Suriname	6.00
42	Steady	Japan	5.83
43	Steady	Armenia	5.58
44	Steady	Singapore	5.00
45=	Steady	Cameroon	4.00
45=	Steady	Ghana	4.00
47	Steady	Costa Rica	3.63
48	Steady	Romania	3.53
49=	Steady	Aruba	3.00
49=	Steady	Bosnia and Herzegovina	3.00
49=	Steady	Botswana	3.00
49=	Steady	Bulgaria	3.00
49=	Steady	Canada	3.00
49=	Steady	Croatia	3.00
49=	Steady	Curaçao	3.00
49=	Steady	Cyprus	3.00
49=	Steady	Finland	3.00
49=	Steady	Georgia	3.00
49=	Steady	Italy	3.00
49=	Steady	Luxembourg	3.00
49=	Steady	Nepal	3.00
49=	Steady	Pakistan	3.00
49=	Steady	United States	3.00
64	Steady	Ukraine	2.00
65=	Steady	Ivory Coast	1.00
65=	Steady	Kenya	1.00
65=	Steady	Morocco	1.00
65=	Steady	Switzerland	1.00
65=	Steady	Thailand	1.00

2017 IKF World Korfball Ranking
Rankings as of January 2017
1	Steady	Netherlands	325.540
2	Steady	Chinese Taipei	310.620
3	▲1	Belgium	281.250
4	▼1	England	278.200
5	▲2	Germany	269.250
6	▼1	China	257.985
7	▼1	Czech Republic	257.375
8	Steady	Catalonia	252.000
9	Steady	Portugal	239.250
10	Steady	Hong Kong	232.940
11	▲1	Russia	218.375
12	▲2	Poland	205.750
13	Steady	Australia	195.875
14	▲1	South Africa	194.625
15	▼4	Hungary	175.125
16	▲1	Scotland	135.250
17	▼1	Turkey	135.155
18	▲5	Slovakia	129.000
19	▲6	Wales	124.750
20	▼1	Brazil	122.000
21	▼3	Ireland	121.500
22	▼2	Serbia	120.750
23	▲3	South Korea	107.000
24	Steady	Zimbabwe	105.000
25	▲4	France	101.000
26	▲1	Sweden	87.250
27	▼6	New Zealand	81.500
28	▲7	India	81.000
29	▼7	Malaysia	80.000
30	Steady	Colombia	77.250
31	Steady	Greece	76.250
32	▼4	Macau	64.750
33	▲3	Dominican Republic	55.125
34	Steady	Zambia	51.750
35	▼3	Japan	46.500
36	▼3	Romania	43.750
37=	▲14	Switzerland	37.000
37=	▲14	Ukraine	37.000
39	▲2	Armenia	29.000
40	▼2	Philippines	28.250
41	▼2	Mexico	26.750
42	▼2	Malawi	25.000
43	▼5	Indonesia	23.875
44	▲7	Sri Lanka	17.000
45=	▼3	Luxembourg	10.000
45=	▼3	United States	10.000
47	▼3	Costa Rica	7.875
48	▼3	Italy	6.000
49	▼3	Bulgaria	5.000
50	▼3	Singapore	4.000
51=	▼3	Cyprus	3.000
51=	▼3	Nepal	3.000
51=	▼3	Pakistan	3.000
54=	▼3	Argentina	1.000
54=	▼3	Aruba	1.000
54=	▼3	Belarus	1.000
54=	▼3	Bosnia and Herzegovina	1.000
54=	▼3	Botswana	1.000
54=	▼3	Cameroon	1.000
54=	▼3	Canada	1.000
54=	▼3	Croatia	1.000
54=	▼3	Curaçao	1.000
54=	▼3	Finland	1.000
54=	▼3	Georgia	1.000
54=	▼3	Ghana	1.000
54=	▼3	Ivory Coast	1.000
54=	▼3	Mongolia	1.000
54=	▼3	Morocco	1.000

2016 IKF World Korfball Ranking
Rankings as of August 2016
1	Steady	Netherlands	359.500
2	▲1	Chinese Taipei	339.000
3	▲1	England	312.750
4	▼2	Belgium	293.000
5	▲2	China	288.250
6	▲3	Czech Republic	281.500
7	▲1	Germany	278.500
8	▼3	Catalonia	246.000
9	▼3	Portugal	245.250
10	▲1	Hong Kong	243.500
11	▲2	Hungary	241.000
12	Steady	Russia	227.500
13	▼3	Australia	224.500
14	Steady	Poland	219.750
15	Steady	South Africa	210.250
16	▲1	Turkey	174.000
17	▼1	Scotland	159.500
18	Steady	Ireland	148.250
19	▲1	Brazil	145.250
20	▲1	Serbia	144.000
21	▼2	New Zealand	141.000
22	Steady	Malaysia	139.500
23	Steady	Slovakia	136.750
24	Steady	Zimbabwe	126.000
25	Steady	Wales	110.250
26	Steady	South Korea	107.500
27	Steady	Sweden	100.000
28	Steady	Macau	99.750
29	Steady	France	92.000
30	▲2	Colombia	85.750
31	▼1	Greece	79.500
32	▼1	Japan	76.250
33	Steady	Romania	66.250
34	Steady	Zambia	59.250
35	Steady	India	49.500
36	▲3	Dominican Republic	46.000
37	Steady	Indonesia	41.750
38	▲2	Philippines	32.000
39	▼3	Mexico	31.500
40	▼2	Malawi	28.500
41	▲1	Armenia	11.000
42=	▼1	Luxembourg	10.000
42=	▼1	United States	10.000
44	Steady	Costa Rica	9.000
45	▼2	Italy	6.000
46	▼1	Bulgaria	5.000
47	▼1	Singapore	4.000
48=	▼1	Cyprus	3.000
48=	▼1	Nepal	3.000
48=	▼1	Pakistan	3.000
51=	▼1	Argentina	1.000
51=	▼1	Aruba	1.000
51=	▼1	Belarus	1.000
51=	▼1	Bosnia and Herzegovina	1.000
51=	▼1	Botswana	1.000
51=	▼1	Cameroon	1.000
51=	▼1	Canada	1.000
51=	▼1	Croatia	1.000
51=	▼1	Curaçao	1.000
51=	▼1	Finland	1.000
51=	▼1	Georgia	1.000
51=	▼1	Ghana	1.000
51=	▼1	Ivory Coast	1.000
51=	▼1	Mongolia	1.000
51=		Sri Lanka	1.000
51=	▼1	Switzerland	1.000
51=	▼1	Ukraine	1.000

2014 IKF World Korfball Ranking
Rankings as of November 2014
1	Steady	Netherlands	188.000
2	Steady	Belgium	182.125
3	Steady	Chinese Taipei	174.150
4	▲1	Portugal	159.875
5	▼1	England	158.500
6	▲2	Czech Republic	136.500
7	▼1	Catalonia	133.000
8	▼1	Australia	130.750
9	▼2	Germany	126.625
10	Steady	China	117.000
11	Steady	Russia	112.125
12	▼1	Hong Kong	112.000
13	▲2	Poland	111.250
14	▲2	Hungary	108.250
15	▼1	South Africa	101.000
16	▲2	New Zealand	91.000
17	▼4	India	73.250
18	▲5	Scotland	72.500
19	▲1	Turkey	70.000
20	▲1	Ireland	69.500
21	▼2	Slovakia	68.750
22	Steady	Serbia	66.000
23	▼6	Wales	63.250
24	▲2	Zimbabwe	52.000
25	▲10	Malaysia	48.000
26	▲1	France	46.750
27	▼2	Sweden	45.000
28	▲4	South Korea	42.250
29	▼4	Romania	39.000
30	Steady	Greece	35.250
31	▲3	Macau	34.750
32	▲1	Japan	33.000
33	▲5	Indonesia	22.750
34=	▼6	Luxembourg	21.250
34=	▼5	Armenia	21.250
36	▲7	Brazil	19.000
37	▲5	Zambia	17.000
38		Colombia	14.000
39	▼7	Italy	12.000
40	▼3	United States	10.000
41=	▲2	Malawi	8.000
41=		Mexico	8.000
42	▼6	Pakistan	6.000
43	▼4	Bulgaria	4.000
44=	▼4	Cyprus	3.000
44=	▼4	Nepal	3.000
46=	▼3	Argentina	1.000
46=	▼3	Aruba	1.000
46=	▼3	Belarus	1.000
46=	▼3	Bosnia and Herzegovina	1.000
46=	▼3	Botswana	1.000
46=	▼3	Canada	1.000
46=	▼3	Croatia	1.000
46=	▼3	Curaçao	1.000
46=	▼3	Denmark	1.000
46=	▼3	Dominican Republic	1.000
46=	▼3	Finland	1.000
46=	▼3	Georgia	1.000
46=	▼3	Mongolia	1.000
46=	▼3	Singapore	1.000
46=	▼3	Suriname	1.000
61=		Bonaire	0.000
61=		Costa Rica	0.000
61=		Ghana	0.000
61=		Philippines	0.000
61=		Papua New Guinea	0.000
61=		Ukraine	0.000
61=		Ivory Coast	0.000

2013 IKF World Korfball Ranking
Rankings as of November 2013
1	Steady	Netherlands	185.625
2	Steady	Belgium	184.750
3	Steady	Chinese Taipei	169.625
4	Steady	England	153.625
5	▲2	Portugal	143.625
6	▼1	Catalonia	140.500
7	▼1	Germany	138.000
8	Steady	Czech Republic	125.375
9	Steady	Australia	122.625
10	Steady	China	119.625
11=	Steady	Hong Kong	108.000
11=	▲2	Russia	108.000
13	▼1	India	107.500
14	▲1	South Africa	104.750
15	▼1	Poland	104.125
16	Steady	Hungary	90.000
17	Steady	Wales	85.000
18	Steady	New Zealand	83.500
19	Steady	Slovakia	80.250
20	▲1	Turkey	72.625
21	▼1	Ireland	70.750
22	Steady	Serbia	67.250
23	Steady	Scotland	63.500
24	Steady	Romania	50.000
25	Steady	Sweden	49.000
26	Steady	Zimbabwe	47.500
27	▲2	France	41.500
28	▼1	Luxembourg	38.000
29	▼1	Armenia	37.000
30	▲1	Greece	32.500
31	▼1	South Korea	31.500
32	Steady	Italy	19.500
33	▲3	Japan	17.000
34	▲3	Macau	16.000
35	Steady	Malaysia	15.125
36	▼3	Pakistan	14.000
37	▼3	United States	10.000
38	▲5	Indonesia	9.000
39	▼2	Bulgaria	5.000
40=	▼1	Cyprus	3.000
40=	Steady	Nepal	3.000
42	▲1	Zambia	2.000
43=		Argentina	1.000
43=		Aruba	1.000
43=		Belarus	1.000
43=		Bosnia and Herzegovina	1.000
43=		Botswana	1.000
43=		Brazil	1.000
43=		Canada	1.000
43=		Croatia	1.000
43=		Curaçao	1.000
43=		Denmark	1.000
43=		Dominican Republic	1.000
43=		Finland	1.000
43=		Georgia	1.000
43=		Malawi	1.000
43=		Mongolia	1.000
43=		Singapore	1.000
43=		Suriname	1.000

2012 IKF World Korfball Ranking
Rankings as of November 2012
1	Steady	Netherlands	249.500
2	Steady	Belgium	240.000
3	Steady	Chinese Taipei	231.625
4	Steady	England	212.500
5	Steady	Catalonia	206.500
6	▲1	Germany	199.125
7	▲1	Portugal	193.875
8	▼2	Czech Republic	182.125
9	▲2	Australia	164.750
10	Steady	China	161.125
11	▲2	Hong Kong	156.500
12	▲2	India	156.000
13	▼4	Russia	154.625
14	▼2	Poland	153.250
15	Steady	South Africa	137.875
16	Steady	Hungary	132.125
17	Steady	Wales	108.750
18	▲1	New Zealand	106.125
19	▼1	Slovakia	103.250
20	Steady	Ireland	94.000
21	▲2	Turkey	86.375
22	▼1	Serbia	85.500
23	▼1	Scotland	80.500
24	Steady	Romania	65.000
25	Steady	Sweden	63.000
26	Steady	Zimbabwe	59.750
27	Steady	Luxembourg	56.750
28	Steady	Armenia	52.750
29	Steady	France	46.250
30	Steady	South Korea	36.250
31	Steady	Greece	35.750
32	Steady	Italy	26.000
33	Steady	Pakistan	19.750
34	Steady	United States	11.000
35	▲1	Malaysia	8.875
36	▼1	Japan	7.000
37	▲1	Bulgaria	5.000
37	Steady	Macau	5.000
39	Steady	Cyprus	3.000
40	Steady	Nepal	2.000
41		Argentina	1.000
41		Aruba	1.000
41		Belarus	1.000
41		Bosnia and Herzegovina	1.000
41		Botswana	1.000
41		Brazil	1.000
41		Canada	1.000
41		Croatia	1.000
41		Curaçao	1.000
41		Denmark	1.000
41		Dominican Republic	1.000
41		Finland	1.000
41		Georgia	1.000
41		Indonesia	1.000
41		Malawi	1.000
41		Mongolia	1.000
41		Papua New Guinea	1.000
41		Singapore	1.000
41		Suriname	1.000
41		Ukraine	1.000
41		Zambia	1.000

2012 IKF World Korfball Ranking
Rankings as of December 2011
Rank	Change	Team	Points
1	Steady	Netherlands	285.875
2	Steady	Belgium	274.625
3	Steady	Chinese Taipei	266.750
4	▲1	England	243.250
5	▲2	Catalonia	238.125
6	▼2	Czech Republic	229.500
7	▼1	Germany	220.875
8	Steady	Portugal	220.375
9	Steady	Russia	211.250
10	▲2	China	190.125
11	▼1	Australia	189.375
12	▲2	Poland	186.750
13	▲2	Hong Kong	173.750
14	▲2	India	173.250
15	▼2	South Africa	161.000
16	▼5	Hungary	159.250
17	▲2	Wales	144.500
18	▼1	Slovakia	130.000
19	▼1	New Zealand	129.375
20	▲1	Ireland	126.250
21	▲1	Serbia	112.750
22	▲1	Scotland	105.500
23	▼3	Turkey	102.750
24	Steady	Romania	86.000
25	▲2	Sweden	84.000
26	Steady	Zimbabwe	82.500
27	▼2	Luxembourg	72.500
28	Steady	Armenia	68.500
29	Steady	France	58.000
30	▲2	South Korea	48.000
31	▲1	Greece	44.000
32	▲2	Italy	31.500
33	▲2	Pakistan	25.500
34	▼4	United States	11.000
35	▲1	Japan	8.000
36	▲2	Malaysia	8.000
37	▼4	Macau	6.000
38	▼1	Bulgaria	5.000
39	▲2	Cyprus	3.000
40	▼1	Nepal	2.000
41		Argentina	1.000
41		Aruba	1.000
41		Belarus	1.000
41		Bosnia and Herzegovina	1.000
41		Botswana	1.000
41		Brazil	1.000
41		Canada	1.000
41		Croatia	1.000
41		Curaçao	1.000
41		Denmark	1.000
41		Dominican Republic	1.000
41		Finland	1.000
41		Georgia	1.000
41		Indonesia	1.000
41		Malawi	1.000
41		Mongolia	1.000
41		Singapore	1.000
41		Suriname	1.000
41		Zambia	1.000

2011 IKF World Korfball Ranking
Rankings as of September 2011
Rank	Change	Team	Points
1	Steady	Netherlands	178.000
2	Steady	Belgium	167.875
3	Steady	Chinese Taipei	160.500
4	Steady	Czech Republic	144.750
5	Steady	England	138.000
6	▲1	Germany	129.500
7	▲1	Catalonia	123.000
8	▲1	Portugal	122.875
9	▼3	Russia	110.875
10	Steady	Australia	105.625
11	▲2	Hungary	99.000
12	▼1	China	91.750
13	▼1	South Africa	91.250
14	▲1	Poland	82.750
15	▼1	Hong Kong	81.750
16	Steady	India	76.250
17	▲2	Slovakia	57.000
18	▼1	New Zealand	55.750
19	▼1	Wales	53.000
20	▲3	Turkey	49.500
21	▼1	Ireland	46.000
22	▼1	Serbia	44.500
23	▼1	Scotland	38.500
24	▲4	Romania	31.000
25	▲1	Luxembourg	29.500
26	▼1	Zimbabwe	27.750
27	Steady	Sweden	27.500
28	▼4	Armenia	26.500
29	▲2	France	25.000
30	▼1	United States	24.000
31	▲1	Greece	23.500
32	▼2	South Korea	18.000
33	▲1	Macau	13.500
34	▲1	Italy	11.000
35	▼2	Pakistan	10.500
36	Steady	Japan	8.000
37	Steady	Bulgaria	7.000
38	▲	Malaysia	3.250
39	▼1	Nepal	2.000

2010 IKF World Korfball Ranking
Rankings as of November 2010
Rank	Change	Team	Points
1	Steady	Netherlands	160.500
2	Steady	Belgium	151.625
3	Steady	Chinese Taipei	144.000
4	Steady	Czech Republic	133.500
5	▲1	England	119.750
6	▼1	Russia	117.875
7	▲3	Germany	116.000
8	Steady	Catalonia	116.000
9	▼2	Portugal	112.625
10	▼1	Australia	100.625
11	▲3	China	91.250
12	Steady	South Africa	88.250
13	▼2	Hungary	87.000
14	▼1	Hong Kong	78.000
15	▲2	Poland	75.750
16	▼1	India	66.750
17	▼1	New Zealand	57.750
18	?	Wales	51.500
19	?	Slovakia	49.750
20	?	Ireland	44.625
21	?	Serbia	43.125
22	?	Scotland	40.125
23	?	Turkey	39.000
24	?	Armenia	32.500
25	▼5	Zimbabwe	32.250
26	?	Luxembourg	29.625
27	?	Sweden	28.250
28	?	Romania	28.125
29	▼11	United States	26.000
30	?	South Korea	25.500
31	?	France	25.125
32	?	Greece	20.625
33	?	Pakistan	19.750
34	?	Macau	11.000
35	?	Italy	11.000
36	?	Japan	8.000
37	?	Bulgaria	5.625
38	?	Nepal	3.250

2009 IKF World Korfball Ranking
Top 20 Rankings as of September 1, 2009
Rank	Change	Team	Points
1	Steady	Netherlands	191.000
2	Steady	Belgium	178.500
3	Steady	Chinese Taipei	166.000
4	Steady	Czech Republic	151.000
5	Steady	Russia	147.750
6	Steady	England	136.500
7	▲1	Portugal	127.750
8	▼1	Catalonia	123.250
9	Steady	Australia	121.500
10	Steady	Germany	115.250
11	?	Hungary	93.500
12	?	South Africa	83.000
13	?	Hong Kong	73.250
14	?	China	69.750
15	?	India	65.000
16	?	New Zealand	61.500
17	?	Poland	57.500
18	?	United States	56.500
19	?	Macau	30.000
20	?	Zimbabwe	16.750
