= Bulgaria national korfball team =

National sports team

Bulgaria
- Association: Bulgarian Federation Korfball and Intercrosse
- IKF membership: 2005
- IKF code: BUL (Bulgaria)
- IKF rank: 46 (Nov. 2025)

European Bowl
- Appearances: 1
- First appearance: 2007
- Best result: 5th (east), 2007

The Bulgaria national korfball team is managed by the Bulgarian Federation Korfball and Intercrosse, representing Bulgaria in korfball international competitions.

== Tournament history ==
European Bowl
Year	Championship	Host	Classification
2007	2nd European Bowl	Serbia	5th place (East)

Balcans Championship
Year	Championship	Host	Classification
2006	1st Balkan Korfball Championship	Neo Petritsi (Greece)	3rd place
2007	2nd Balkan Korfball Championship	Arandjelovac (Serbia)	3rd place
2008	3rd Balkan Korfball Championship	Blagoevgrad (Bulgaria)	4th place
