= South Korea national korfball team =

National sports team

South Korea
- Association: Korea Korfball Federation (KKF)
- IKF membership: 2007
- IKF code: KOR (South Korea)
- IKF rank: 44 (Nov. 2025)

Asia-Oceania Championship
- Appearances: 3
- First appearance: 2010
- Best result: 7th place

Asia Championship
- Appearances: 1
- First appearance: 2008
- Best result: 6th place, 2008

The South Korea national korfball team is managed by the Korea Korfball Federation (KKF), representing Korea in korfball international competitions.

== Tournament history ==
Asia-Oceania Championships
Year	Championship	Host	Classification
2010	8th Asia-Oceania Championship	China	7th place
2014	9th Asia-Oceania Championship	Hong Kong	7th place
2018	10th Asia-Oceania Championship	Saitama (Japan)	8th place

Asia Championships
Year	Championship	Host	Classification
2008	2nd Asian Championship	Jaipur (India)	6th place

== Current squad ==
National team in the 2014 Asia-Oceania Championship

- Kim Jaewon
- Sung Kyungha
- Jo Chaebin
- Lee Soyoung
- Lee Hayoun
- Moon Dongjoo
- Jo Hyunjoo
- Kim Insoo
- Jeong Sungkwan
- Kim Youngjoon
- Kim Beomsoo
- Son Minwoo
- Coach: Huang Ying-Che, Kim Daechul
