= Italy national korfball team =

Italy
- Association: Federazione Italiana Korfball (FIK)
- IKF membership: 2003
- IKF code: ITA (Italy)
- IKF rank: 39 (Nov. 2014)

European Bowl
- Appearances: 1
- First appearance: 2009
- Best result: 7th (east), 2009
- FIK website

The Italy national korfball team (Italian: Nazionale di korfball dell'Italia) is managed by the Federazione Italiana Korfball (FIK), representing Italy in korfball international competitions.

In 2005 Italy won the Mediterranean Cup, consisting in a double match with Greece, being their first matches ever.

== Tournament History ==
European Bowl
Year	Championship	Host	Classification
2009	3rd European Bowl	Slovakia (East division)	7th place (East)

== Current squad ==
National team in the 2009 European Bowl

- Claudia Constantiniu
- Donatella Di Fonzo
- Elena Cavriani
- Monica Formentin
- Cristina Pettenuzzo
- Silvia Crosetti
- Tea Bezzicheri
- Scott Pygall
- Alessio Vergagni
- Andrea Barbieri
- Evans Bentivogli
- Stefano Balostro
- Arturo De Nardi
- Giulio De Nardi
- Coach: Massimo Cereda
