= Armenia national korfball team =

National sports team

Armenia
- Association: Korfball Federation of Armenia (KFA)
- IKF membership: 1990
- IKF code: ARM (Armenia)
- IKF rank: 38 (Nov. 2025)

World Championships
- Appearances: 3
- First appearance: 1991
- Best result: 8th place, 1991

European Bowl
- Appearances: 3
- First appearance: 2005
- Best result: 5th place, 2005
- korfball.am

The Armenia national korfball team is managed by the Korfball Federation of Armenia (KFA), representing Armenia in international korfball competitions.

== Tournament history ==
World Championships
Year	Championship	Host	Classification
1991	4th World Championship	Antwerp (Belgium)	8th place
1995	5th World Championship	New Delhi (India)	9th place
2003	7th World Championship	Rotterdam (Netherlands)	15th place

European Bowl
Year	Championship	Host	Classification
2005	1st European Bowl	Terrassa (Spain)	5th place
2009	3rd European Bowl	Prievidza (Slovakia)	5th place (East)
2016	5th European Bowl	Slovakia	7th place (East)

== Current squad ==
National team in the 2009 European Bowl

- Inga Yazichyan
- Karine Sargsyan
- Narine Muradyan
- Tatevik Grigoryan
- Arman Alaberkyan
- Karen Nazaryan
- Rafael Hambardzumyan
- Vardan Shahumyan
- Coach: Arman Alaberkyan, Melik Sandrosyan

National team in the 2005 European Bowl

- Lilit Khorenyan
- Sveta Arakelyan
- Narine Muradyan
- Karine Sargsyan
- Milena Tshuguryan
- Hovic Hakobyan
- Vardan Shahumyan
- Tigran Vardanyan
- Vardges Baghdasaryan
- Arman Ala berkyan
- Rafael Hambardzumyan
- Coach: Melik Sandrosyan

== See also ==
- Sport in Armenia
