= India national korfball team =

India
- Association: Korfball Federation of India (KFI)
- IKF membership: 1980
- IKF code: IND (India)
- IKF rank: 23 (January 2023)

World Championships
- Appearances: 6
- First appearance: 1991
- Best result: 11th place, 1991, 1999

World Games
- Appearances: 1
- First appearance: 1985
- Best result: 6th place, 1985

Asia-Oceania Championship
- Appearances: 5
- First appearance: 1992
- Best result: 3rd place, 1992, 1998, 2002, 2006

Asia Championship
- Appearances: 1
- First appearance: 2008
- Best result: 2nd place, 2008

The India national korfball team is managed by the Korfball Federation of India (KFI), representing India in korfball international competitions.

India is the oldest korfball playing country in Asia. Since 1979, when the game was first introduced in India, korfball popularity has continued to rise and now the game is played in 27 states with each state having its own association to promote and organise events. Korfball is recognised by the Union Ministry for Youth Affairs and Sports, Government of India, and national championships in senior, junior and sub-junior categories and the inter-university and inter-school championships are held regularly.

== Professional league ==
In 2026, the Korfball Premier League (KPL) was launched as India's first professional korfball league, providing a domestic competitive platform for Indian national team players. The league is co-organised by Sporty Bharat and Entertainment Private Limited and Game Changers FZCO, with the support of the Korfball Federation of India and the Foreign Correspondents' Club of South Asia. The inaugural season, scheduled for September 2026, features eight franchise teams with 112 players — 62 Indian and 50 international players from more than 20 countries — with a prize pool of ₹31 lakh for the winning team and ₹11 lakh for the runner-up. Indian players confirmed for the inaugural season include Yamini Dehloo, Alisha, Yuri Sethi, Sarang Sharma, Sourbh Dalal, and Rajat Kumar Saini.

== Tournament history ==
World Championships
Year	Championship	Host	Classification	M	W	D	L	GF	GA	GD
1991	4th World Championship	(Belgium) Antwerp	11th place	6	1	0	5	76	128	-52
1995	5th World Championship	(India) New Delhi	12th place	5	0	0	5	0	0	-0
1999	6th World Championship	(Australia) Adelaide	11th place	5	1	0	4	0	0	-0
2003	7th World Championship	(Netherlands) Rotterdam	14th place	6	1	0	5*	0	0	-0
2007	8th World Championship	(Czech Republic) Brno	12th place	7	2*	0	5	0	0	-0
2011	9th World Championship	(China) Shaoxing	13th place	7	3	0	4	0	0	-0
2023	12th World Championship	(Taiwan) Taipei	19th place	7	2	0	5	0	0	-0
Total	7/12	_	_	43	10	0	33	0	0	-0

- One win and One Lose in Over Time.

World Games
Year	Championship	Host	Classification
1985	2nd World Games	(United Kingdom) London	6th place

Asia-Oceania Championships
Year	Championship	Host	Classification
1992	2nd Asia-Oceania Championship	(India) New Delhi	3rd place
1998	4th Asia-Oceania Championship	(South Africa) Durban	3rd place
2002	5th Asia-Oceania Championship	(India) New Delhi	3rd place
2006	7th Asia-Oceania Championship	Hong Kong	3rd place
2010	8th Asia-Oceania Championship	(China) Zhuzhou	5th place
2023	11h Asia-Oceania Championship	(Thailand) Pattaya	5th place

Asia Championships
Year	Championship	Host	Classification
2008	2nd Asian Championship	(India) Jaipur	2nd place
2024	6th Asian Championship	Hong Kong	6th place

Junior World Cup
Year	Championship	Host	Classification
2009	19th Junior World Cup Tournament	Netherlands	7th place
