= 2007 Korfball World Championship =

2007 IKF World Korfball Championship
Tournament details
- Host country: Czech Republic
- Dates: 1 - 10 November
- Teams: 16
- Venue(s): 2 (in 1 host city)

Final positions
- Champions: Netherlands (7th title)
- Runners-up: Belgium
- Third place: Czech Republic
- Fourth place: Portugal

Tournament statistics
- Matches played: 56
- Top scorer(s): (Netherlands) Michiel Gerritsen (35 goals)

The 8th Korfball World Championship was held in Brno (Czech Republic) on November 1–10, 2007 with 16 national teams in competition.

The best 8 teams qualified for the World Games 2009 in Kaohsiung, Chinese Taipei.

These days was also played the final match of the European Bowl with the champions of the Eastern and Western divisions, Slovakia and Wales.

== Teams ==
Pool A
Netherlands
Portugal
Catalonia
China

Pool B
Belgium
Australia
South Africa
Poland

Pool C
Czech Republic
England
Hungary
India

Pool D
Chinese Taipei
Germany
Russia
United States

== Pool matches ==
Legend

Pts = Points
P = Played games
W = Win (3p)
w = win with golden goal/penalties (2p)
l = lost with golden goal/penalties (1p)
L = Lost

F = Korfs favour
A = Korfs against
D = Difference korfs (KF-KA)
GG = Match won by golden goal

POOL A	Pts	P	W	w	l	L	F	A	D
Netherlands	9	3	3	0	0	0	101	31	+70
Portugal	6	3	2	0	0	1	59	47	+12
Catalonia	3	3	1	0	0	2	44	57	−13
China	0	3	0	0	0	3	28	97	−69

November 1, 2007; 15:30
November 1, 2007; 15:30	Netherlands	29–11	Catalonia	Brno
November 1, 2007; 15:30		Details		Brno

November 1, 2007; 17:15
November 1, 2007; 17:15	Portugal	32–7	China	Brno
November 1, 2007; 17:15		Details		Brno

November 2, 2007; 15:45
November 2, 2007; 15:45	Catalonia	23–11	China	Brno
November 2, 2007; 15:45		Details		Brno

November 2, 2007; 17:30
November 2, 2007; 17:30	Netherlands	30–10	Portugal	Brno
November 2, 2007; 17:30		Details		Brno

November 3, 2007; 14:00
November 3, 2007; 14:00	Netherlands	42–10	China	Brno
November 3, 2007; 14:00		Details		Brno

November 3, 2007; 15:45
November 3, 2007; 15:45	Portugal	17–10	Catalonia	Brno
November 3, 2007; 15:45		Details		Brno

POOL B	Pts	P	W	w	l	L	F	A	D
Belgium	9	3	3	0	0	0	92	18	+74
Australia	3	3	1	0	0	2	40	63	−23
Poland	3	3	1	0	0	2	38	62	−24
South Africa	3	3	1	0	0	2	42	69	−27

November 1, 2007; 15:45
November 1, 2007; 15:45	Belgium	32–7	South Africa	Brno
November 1, 2007; 15:45		Details		Brno

November 1, 2007; 17:30
November 1, 2007; 17:30	Australia	12–18	Poland	Brno
November 1, 2007; 17:30		Details		Brno

November 2, 2007; 14:00
November 2, 2007; 14:00	South Africa	22–15	Poland	Brno
November 2, 2007; 14:00		Details		Brno

November 2, 2007; 19:15
November 2, 2007; 19:15	Belgium	32–6	Australia	Brno
November 2, 2007; 19:15		Details		Brno

November 3, 2007; 15:45
November 3, 2007; 15:45	Belgium	28–5	Poland	Brno
November 3, 2007; 15:45		Details		Brno

November 3, 2007; 19:15
November 3, 2007; 19:15	Australia	22–13	South Africa	Brno
November 3, 2007; 19:15		Details		Brno

POOL C	Pts	P	W	w	l	L	F	A	D
Czech Republic	8	3	2	1	0	0	50	38	+12
England	7	3	2	0	1	0	38	31	+7
Hungary	3	3	1	0	0	2	38	28	+10
India	0	3	0	0	0	3	34	63	−29

November 1, 2007; 14:00
November 1, 2007; 14:00	England	20–13	India	Brno
November 1, 2007; 14:00		Details		Brno

November 1, 2007; 20:15
November 1, 2007; 20:15	Czech Republic	14–13	Hungary	Brno
November 1, 2007; 20:15		Details		Brno

November 2, 2007; 15:45
November 2, 2007; 15:45	Hungary	19–7	India	Brno
November 2, 2007; 15:45		Details		Brno

November 2, 2007; 17:30
November 2, 2007; 17:30	Czech Republic	12–11 (gg)	England	Brno
November 2, 2007; 17:30		Details		Brno

November 3, 2007; 14:00
November 3, 2007; 14:00	England	7–6	Hungary	Brno
November 3, 2007; 14:00		Details		Brno

November 3, 2007; 17:30
November 3, 2007; 17:30	Czech Republic	24–14	India	Brno
November 3, 2007; 17:30		Details		Brno

POOL D	Pts	P	W	w	l	L	F	A	D
Chinese Taipei	9	3	3	0	0	0	68	44	+24
Russia	6	3	2	0	0	1	48	41	+7
Germany	3	3	1	0	0	2	52	44	+8
United States	0	3	0	0	0	3	31	70	−39

November 1, 2007; 12:00
November 1, 2007; 12:00	Chinese Taipei	20–16	Russia	Brno
November 1, 2007; 12:00		Details		Brno

November 1, 2007; 13:45
November 1, 2007; 13:45	Germany	24–10	United States	Brno
November 1, 2007; 13:45		Details		Brno

November 2, 2007; 14:00
November 2, 2007; 14:00	Russia	19–9	United States	Brno
November 2, 2007; 14:00		Details		Brno

November 2, 2007; 19:15
November 2, 2007; 19:15	Chinese Taipei	21–16	Germany	Brno
November 2, 2007; 19:15		Details		Brno

November 3, 2007; 17:30
November 3, 2007; 17:30	Chinese Taipei	27–12	United States	Brno
November 3, 2007; 17:30		Details		Brno

November 3, 2007; 19:15
November 3, 2007; 19:15	Germany	12–13	Russia	Brno
November 3, 2007; 19:15		Details		Brno

== Second round ==
=== Title pools ===
Done with the two best teams in every pool of the first round, carrying forward their match result.

POOL E	Pts	P	W	w	l	L	F	A	D
Netherlands	9	3	3	0	0	0	88	25	+63
Portugal	6	3	2	0	0	1	41	57	−16
Chinese Taipei	3	3	1	0	0	2	44	61	−17
Russia	0	3	0	0	0	3	34	64	−30

November 5, 2007; 17:30
November 5, 2007; 17:30	Netherlands	30–6	Russia	Brno
November 5, 2007; 17:30		Details		Brno

November 5, 2007; 19:15
November 5, 2007; 19:15	Portugal	17–15	Chinese Taipei	Brno
November 5, 2007; 19:15		Details		Brno

November 6, 2007; 17:30
November 6, 2007; 17:30	Portugal	14–12	Russia	Brno
November 6, 2007; 17:30		Details		Brno

November 6, 2007; 19:15
November 6, 2007; 19:15	Netherlands	28–9	Chinese Taipei	Brno
November 6, 2007; 19:15		Details		Brno

POOL F	Pts	P	W	w	l	L	F	A	D
Belgium	9	3	3	0	0	0	69	28	+41
Czech Republic	5	3	1	1	0	1	42	43	−1
England	3	3	0	1	1	1	34	38	−4
Australia	1	3	0	0	1	2	27	63	−36

November 5, 2007; 17:30
November 5, 2007; 17:30	Belgium	14–10	England	Brno
November 5, 2007; 17:30		Details		Brno

November 5, 2007; 19:15
November 5, 2007; 19:15	Australia	9–18	Czech Republic	Brno
November 5, 2007; 19:15		Details		Brno

November 6, 2007; 17:30
November 6, 2007; 17:30	Australia	12–13 (gg)	England	Brno
November 6, 2007; 17:30		Details		Brno

November 6, 2007; 19:15
November 6, 2007; 19:15	Belgium	23–12	Czech Republic	Brno
November 6, 2007; 19:15		Details		Brno

=== Pools for 9th–16th places ===
Done with the two last teams in every pool of the first round, carrying forward their match result.

POOL G	Pts	P	W	w	l	L	F	A	D
Catalonia	9	3	3	0	0	0	50	23	+27
Germany	6	3	2	0	0	1	52	32	+20
China	3	3	1	0	0	2	36	53	−17
United States	0	3	0	0	0	3	24	54	−30

November 5, 2007; 14:00
November 5, 2007; 14:00	Catalonia	14–1	United States	Brno
November 5, 2007; 14:00		Details		Brno

November 5, 2007; 15:45
November 5, 2007; 15:45	China	9–17	Germany	Brno
November 5, 2007; 15:45		Details		Brno

November 6, 2007; 14:00
November 6, 2007; 14:00	China	16–13	United States	Brno
November 6, 2007; 14:00		Details		Brno

November 6, 2007; 15:45
November 6, 2007; 15:45	Catalonia	13–11	Germany	Brno
November 6, 2007; 15:45		Details		Brno

POOL H	Pts	P	W	w	l	L	F	A	D
Hungary	9	3	3	0	0	0	55	25	+30
India	5	3	1	1	0	1	50	54	−4
South Africa	3	1	1	0	0	2	51	63	−12
Poland	1	3	0	0	1	2	39	53	−14

November 5, 2007; 14:00
November 5, 2007; 14:00	Poland	16–17 (gg)	India	Brno
November 5, 2007; 14:00		Details		Brno

November 5, 2007; 15:45
November 5, 2007; 15:45	South Africa	10–22	Hungary	Brno
November 5, 2007; 15:45		Details		Brno

November 6, 2007; 14:00
November 6, 2007; 14:00	South Africa	19–26	India	Brno
November 6, 2007; 14:00		Details		Brno

November 6, 2007; 15:45
November 6, 2007; 15:45	Poland	8–14	Hungary	Brno
November 6, 2007; 15:45		Details		Brno

== Semifinals ==
=== 13th–16th places ===
November 7, 2007; 14:00
November 7, 2007; 14:00	China	15–17	Poland	Brno
November 7, 2007; 14:00		Details		Brno

November 7, 2007; 16:00
November 7, 2007; 16:00	South Africa	9–10 (gg)	United States	Brno
November 7, 2007; 16:00		Details		Brno

=== 9th–12th places ===
November 7, 2007; 18:00
November 7, 2007; 18:00	Catalonia	12–10	India	Brno
November 7, 2007; 18:00		Details		Brno

November 7, 2007; 20:00
November 7, 2007; 20:00	Hungary	17–16	Germany	Brno
November 7, 2007; 20:00		Details		Brno

=== 5th–8th places ===
November 8, 2007; 14:00
November 8, 2007; 14:00	Chinese Taipei	21–13	Australia	Brno
November 8, 2007; 14:00		Details		Brno

November 8, 2007; 16:00
November 8, 2007; 16:00	England	9–13	Russia	Brno
November 8, 2007; 16:00		Details		Brno

=== Championship semifinals ===
November 8, 2007; 18:00
November 8, 2007; 18:00	Netherlands	22–9	Czech Republic	Brno
November 8, 2007; 18:00		Details		Brno

November 8, 2007; 20:00
November 8, 2007; 20:00	Belgium	19–6	Portugal	Brno
November 8, 2007; 20:00		Details		Brno

== FINALS ==
15th–16th places

November 9, 2007; 15:15
November 9, 2007; 15:15	China	16–17 (gg)	South Africa	Brno
November 9, 2007; 15:15		Details		Brno

13th–14th places

November 9, 2007; 17:00
November 9, 2007; 17:00	Poland	12–13	United States	Brno
November 9, 2007; 17:00		Details		Brno

11th–12th places

November 9, 2007; 18:45
November 9, 2007; 18:45	India	9–19	Germany	Brno
November 9, 2007; 18:45		Details		Brno

9th–10th places

November 9, 2007; 20:30
November 9, 2007; 20:30	Catalonia	13–12 (gg)	Hungary	Brno
November 9, 2007; 20:30		Details		Brno

7th–8th places

November 10, 2007; 10:00
November 10, 2007; 10:00	Australia	11–12	England	Brno
November 10, 2007; 10:00		Details		Brno

5th–6th places

November 10, 2007; 12:00
November 10, 2007; 12:00	Chinese Taipei	12–8	Russia	Brno
November 10, 2007; 12:00		Details		Brno

3rd–4th places

November 10, 2007; 14:00
November 10, 2007; 14:00	Czech Republic	19–14	Portugal	Brno
November 10, 2007; 14:00		Details		Brno

FINAL

November 10, 2007; 16:00
November 10, 2007; 16:00	Netherlands	23–10	Belgium	Brno
November 10, 2007; 16:00		Details		Brno

Semi-finals
8 November – Brno
Netherlands	22
Czech Republic	9
8 November – Brno
Portugal	6
Belgium	19

Final
10 November – Brno
Netherlands	23
Belgium	10
Third place
10 November – Brno
Czech Republic	19
Portugal	14

2007 World Korfball champions

Netherlands
Seventh title

== Final standings ==
Team
1 Netherlands
2 Belgium
3 Czech Republic
4 Portugal
5 Chinese Taipei
6 Russia
7 England
8 Australia
9 Catalonia
10 Hungary
11 Germany
12 India
13 United States
14 Poland
15 South Africa
16 China

== See also ==
- Korfball World Championship
- International Korfball Federation
