= Indonesia national korfball team =

National korfball team

Indonesia
- Association: Indonesian Korfball Association
- IKF membership: 1984
- IKF code: INA (Indonesia)
- IKF rank: 35 (Nov. 2025)

World Championships
- Appearances: 2
- First appearance: 1987
- Best result: 10th place, 1987

Asia-Oceania Championship
- Appearances: 5
- First appearance: 1990

The Indonesia national korfball team is managed by the Indonesian Korfball Association (PKSI), representing Indonesia in korfball international competitions.

== Tournament history ==
World Championships
Year	Championship	Host	Classification
1987	3rd World Championship	Makkum (The Netherlands)	10th place
1991	4th World Championship	Antwerp (Belgium)	12th place

Asia-Oceania Championships
Year	Championship	Host	Classification
1990	1st Asia-Oceania Championship	Jakarta (Indonesia)	4th place
1992	2nd Asia-Oceania Championship	Delhi (India)	not participate
1994	3rd Asia-Oceania Championship	Adelaide (Australia)	3rd place
1998	4th Asia-Oceania Championship	Durban (South Africa)	not participate
2002	5th Asia-Oceania Championship	India (India)	not participate
2004	6th Asia-Oceania Championship	New Zealand (New Zealand)	not participate
2006	7th Asia-Oceania Championship	Hong Kong (Hong Kong)	not participate
2010	8th Asia-Oceania Championship	China (China)	not participate
2014	9th Asia-Oceania Championship	Kowloon (Hong Kong)	10th place
2018	10th Asia-Oceania Championship	Saitama (Japan)	9th place
2022	11th Asia-Oceania Championship	Thailand	10th place

Asian Championships
Year	Championship	Host	Classification
2013	3rd Asian Championship	Tian Jin (China)	7th place
