= 2023–24 IKF Europe Satellite Cup =

European korfball tournament

IKF Europe Satellite Cup
- 2023–24
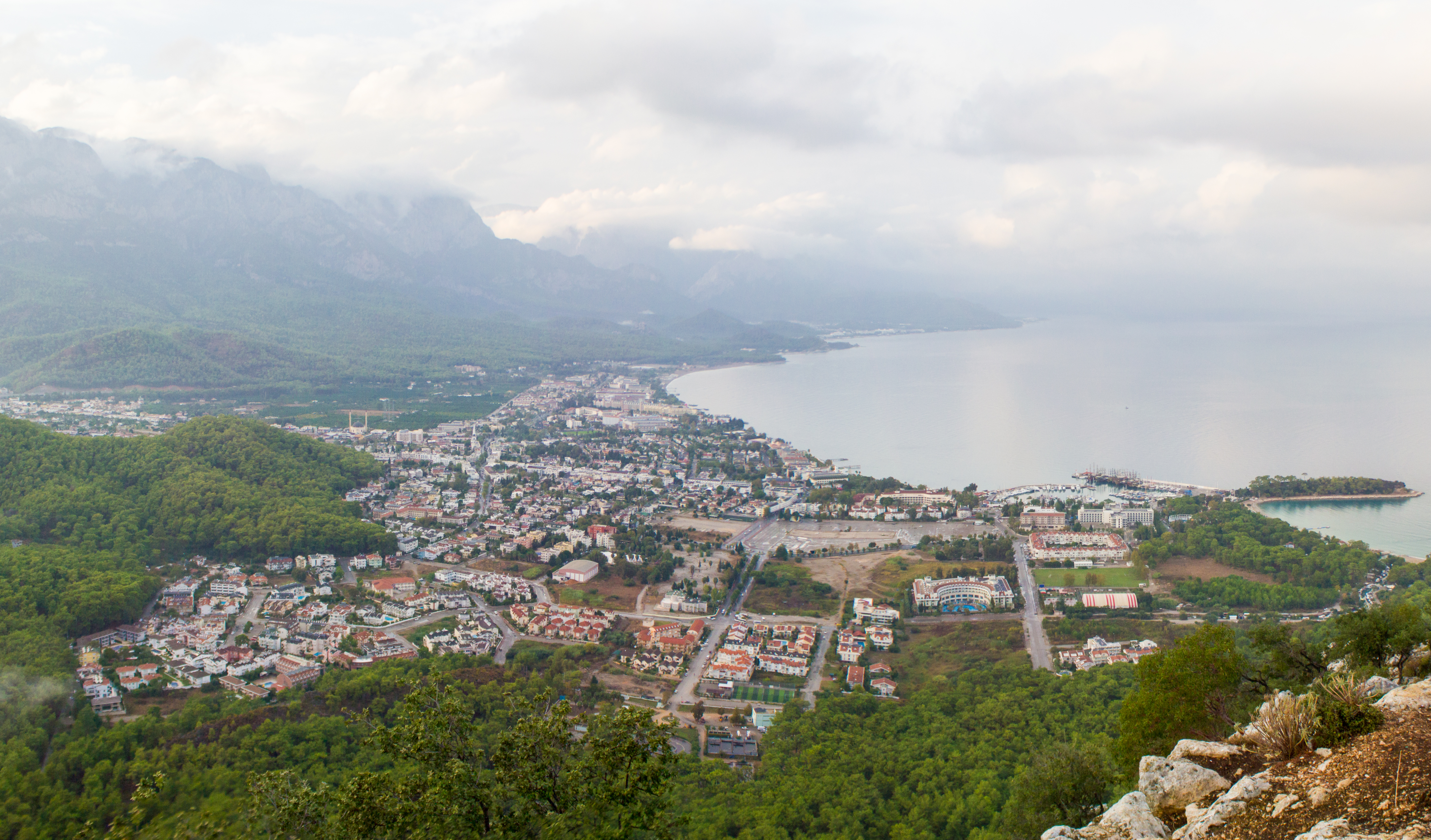
- The event was held in Kemer.

Tournament information
- Sport: Korfball
- Dates: 18–20 January 2024
- Host: Kemer
- Teams: 4
- Website: IKF Europe Satellite Cup

Final positions
- Champions: (Germany) Schweriner KC (1st title)
- Runner-up: (Portugal) CCCD Carnaxide

Tournament statistics
- Matches played: 6

The 2023–24 IKF Europe Satellite Cup is the 2nd edition of IKF's third-tier competition for Korfball clubs. NC Benfica are the defending champions, but could not defend their title after starting in Round 2 in the Champions League.

Schweriner KC won the event after winning every game.

== Format ==
Four teams play each other in a round robin format where the group winners would win the Satellite Cup.

== Teams ==
Teams who finished second and third in Round 1 of the Champions League qualified for the Satellite Cup. FJEP Bonson and Dolphins Prievidza originally qualified for the event from Group B. However, at a late stage, both teams withdrew and Turkish sides, Kocaeli University and Yildiz Technical University took their place.

Team	Qualification
(Germany) Schweriner KC	Finished 2nd in Round 1 Group A.
(Portugal) CCCD Carnaxide	Finished 3rd in Round 1 Group A.
(Turkey) Yildiz Technical University	Finished 4th in Round 1 Group A.
(Turkey) Kocaeli University	Finished 8th in Round 1 Group B.

== Group stage ==
Pos	Team	Pld	W	OTW	OTL	L	GF	GA	GD	Pts	Qualification
1	(Germany) Schweriner KC	3	3	0	0	0	64	39	+25	9	Champion
2	(Portugal) CCCD Carnaxide	3	1	0	1	1	53	58	−5	4	
3	(Turkey) Kocaeli University	3	1	0	0	2	43	53	−10	3	
4	(Turkey) Yildiz Technical University	3	0	1	0	2	48	58	−10	2	

Source: IKF

18 January 2024; 17:30	Yildiz Technical University (Turkey)	14–22	(Germany) Schweriner KC	Kemer
18 January 2024; 17:30	Onat 5	(6–12)	Goepfert 9	Kemer
18 January 2024; 17:30		Report		Kemer

18 January 2024; 19:30	Kocaeli University (Turkey)	16–19	(Portugal) CCCD Carnaxide	Kemer
18 January 2024; 19:30	three players 4	(8–9)	Correia 5	Kemer
18 January 2024; 19:30		Report		Kemer

19 January 2024; 14:00	CCCD Carnaxide (Portugal)	15–22	(Germany) Schweriner KC	Kemer
19 January 2024; 14:00	Falcão 6	(6–12)	Witthaus 6	Kemer
19 January 2024; 14:00		Report		Kemer

19 January 2024; 16:00	Yildiz Technical University (Turkey)	14–17	(Turkey) Kocaeli University	Kemer
19 January 2024; 16:00	Çetin 4	(4–10)	Kortel 6	Kemer
19 January 2024; 16:00		Report		Kemer

20 January 2024; 14:00	Yildiz Technical University (Turkey)	20–19 OT	(Portugal) CCCD Carnaxide	Kemer
20 January 2024; 14:00	Çetin 8	(10–12)	Tomás Lourenço 6	Kemer
20 January 2024; 14:00		Report		Kemer

20 January 2024; 16:00	Kocaeli University (Turkey)	10–20	(Germany) Schweriner KC	Kemer
20 January 2024; 16:00	Arslan, Polat 3	(6–10)	Goepfert 4	Kemer
20 January 2024; 16:00		Report		Kemer

2023–24 IKF Europe Satellite Cup Champions

Schweriner KC
First title

== See also ==
- 2023–24 IKF Europe Korfball Champions League
- 2023–24 IKF Europe Challenger Cup
