= 2023–24 IKF Europe Korfball Champions League =

European korfball tournament

IKF Europe Korfball Champions League
- 2023–24
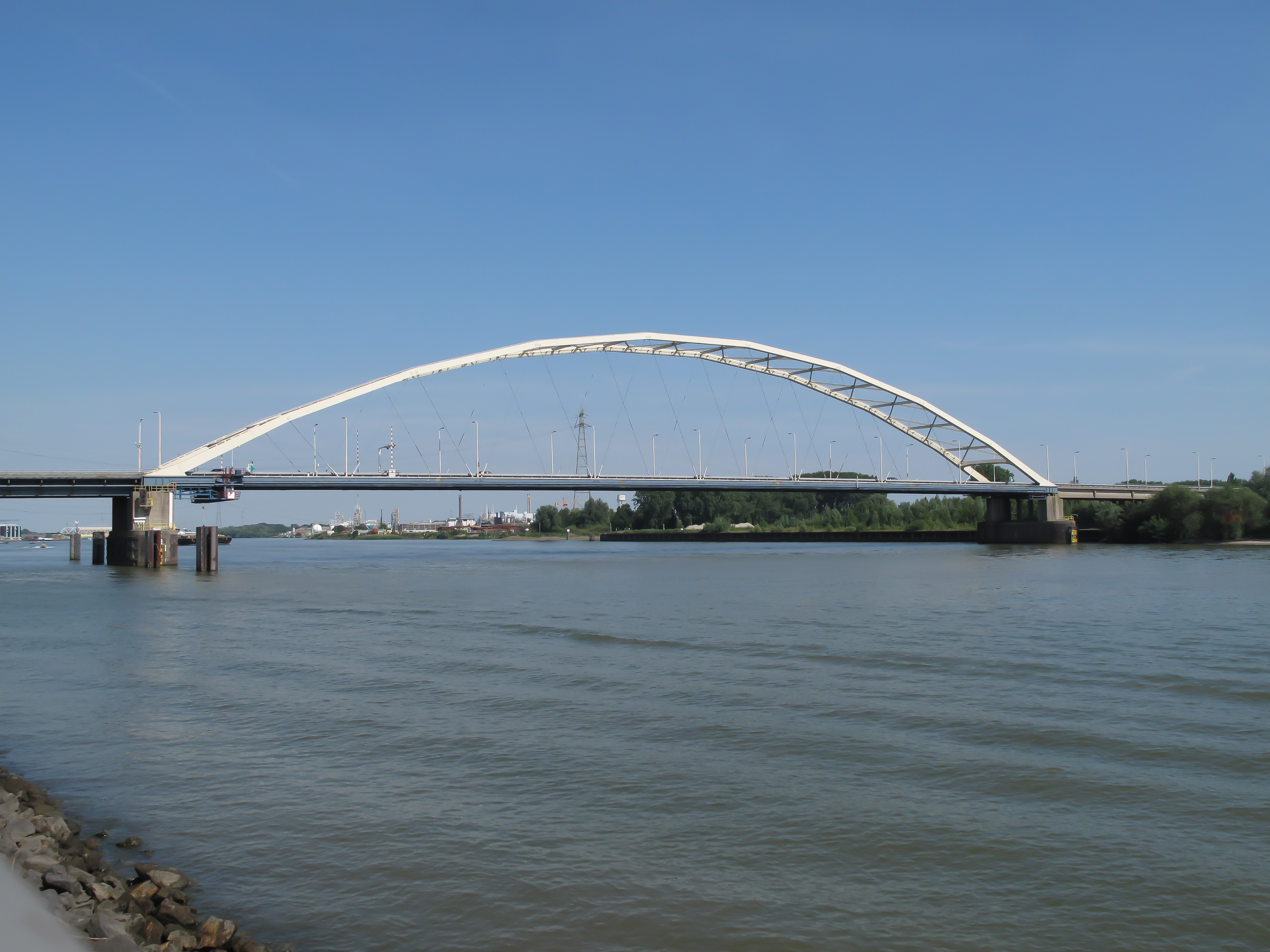
- The final round was held in Papendrecht.

Tournament information
- Sport: Korfball
- Dates: 21 September 2023–10 February 2024
- Venue: PKC Hall
- Teams: 25
- Website: Korfball Champions League

Final positions
- Champions: (Netherlands) PKC/Vertom (2nd title)
- Runner-up: (Belgium) Boeckenberg KC

The 2023–24 IKF Europe Korfball Champions League is the 2nd edition of IKF's premier competition for Korfball clubs under a new name. PKC/Vertom are the defending champions.

PKC/Vertom successfully defended their title by defeating Boeckenberg KC in the final.

== Format ==
The format was given a few tweaks after feedback from last season.

- Round 1 – 13 teams are drawn into 2 Round Robin groups, the group winners advance to Round 2, while the teams who finish second and third play the Satellite Cup.
- Round 2 – 8 teams, plus the two advancing teams from Round 1, are drawn into 2 Round Robin groups, the group winners advance to Champions League, while the teams who finish second and third play the Challenger Cup.
- Champions League – Originally, 4 automatically qualified teams, plus the two advancing teams from Round 2, are drawn into 2 Round Robin groups of three, the top 2 progress to the semifinals. However, the format changed after the late withdrawal of CC Oeiras. Instead, five teams will play a five team Round Robin group. The winners of the group will be crowned champions.

== Teams ==
Champions League
(Belgium) Boeckenberg KC (1st)	(Germany) TuS Schildgen (1st)	(Germany) SG Pegasus	(Netherlands) PKC/Vertom ^{CL} (1st)

Round 2
(Catalonia) KC Barcelona	(Catalonia) Platja d'Aro KC	(Czech Republic) KCC České Budějovice	(Czech Republic) KK Brno
(England) Bec KC (1st)	(England) Trojans KC (2nd)	(Poland) Marcovia Marki	(Portugal) NC Benfica

Round 1
(Catalonia) CK Vallparadís	(England) Tornadoes KC	(France) FJEP Bonson	(France) SJABGB
(Germany) Schweriner KC	(Hungary) ~~Kékvölgy SE~~	(Hungary) 1908 SZAC Budapest	(Portugal) CCCD Carnaxide
(Portugal) CC Oeiras	(Scotland) Glasgow KC	(Slovakia) Dolphins Prievidza	(Turkey) Kocaeli University
(Turkey) Yildiz Technical University	(Wales) Cardiff City KC (1st)	(Wales) Newport Centurions (2nd)	

== Round and draw dates ==
=== Schedule ===
Phase	Draw date	Round date
Round 1	6 July 2023	7–10 September 2023
Round 2	24 August 2023	28 November–2 December 2023
Champions League	14 December 2023	7–10 February 2024

== Round 1 ==
The tournament winners qualify for Round 2, while the teams who finish second and third qualify for the Satellite Cup. One group was held in Lisbon, while the other was held in Cardiff. Despite teams from Portugal taking part in this round, no team was deemed as the host team of the group in Lisbon.

=== Draw ===
The draw was on 6 July 2023. The two Welsh clubs were pre-drawn into Group B. The Turkish representatives were not known at the time of the draw.

Pot 1	Pot 2	Pot 3	Pot 4	Pot 5	Pot 6	Pot 7
(Portugal) CC Oeiras (Portugal) CCCD Carnaxide	(Catalonia) CK Vallparadís (England) Tornadoes KC	Turkey 1 (Note: The team who took this spot was Yildiz Technical University); Turkey 2 (Note: The team who took this spot was Kocaeli University)	(France) FJEP Bonson (France) SJABGB	(Hungary) 1908 SZAC Budapest (Scotland) Glasgow KC	(Slovakia) Dolphins Prievidza (Germany) Schweriner KC	(Hungary) ~~Kékvölgy SE~~

=== Round 1-A ===
21–23 September 2023, Lisbon, Portugal

Pos	Team	Pld	W	OTW	OTL	L	GF	GA	GD	Pts	Qualification	(Catalonia) VAL	(Germany) SCH	(Portugal) CAR	(Turkey) YIL	(France) SJA	(Hungary) SZAC	(Hungary) KEK
1	(Catalonia) CK Vallparadís	5	5	0	0	0	87	49	+38	15	Round 2	—	15–14	—	18–10	20–10	19–5	—
2	(Germany) Schweriner KC	5	3	0	1	1	73	55	+18	10	Satellite Cup	—	—	—	—	—	—	—
3	(Portugal) CCCD Carnaxide	5	3	0	0	2	73	58	+15	9	Satellite Cup	10–15	8–16	—	15–10	19–8	21–9	—
4	(Turkey) Yildiz Technical University	5	2	0	0	3	63	68	−5	6	Satellite Cup	—	10–15	—	—	17–7	16–13	—
5	(France) SJABGB	5	1	0	0	4	45	82	−37	3		—	9–16	—	—	—	11–10	—
6	(Hungary) 1908 SZAC Budapest	5	0	1	0	4	50	79	−29	2		—	13–12 OT	—	—	—	—	—
7	(Hungary) Kékvölgy SE	0	0	0	0	0	0	0	0	0	Withdrew	—	—	—	—	—	—	—

Source: IKF

=== Round 1-B ===
22–24 September 2023, Cardiff, Wales

==== Group A ====
Pos	Team	Pld	W	OTW	OTL	L	GF	GA	GD	Pts	Qualification	(Portugal) OEI	(France) BON	(Scotland) GLA	(Wales) NEW
1	(Portugal) CC Oeiras	3	3	0	0	0	89	14	+75	9	Semifinals	—	22–6	22–7	—
2	(France) FJEP Bonson	3	2	0	0	1	41	35	+6	6	Semifinals	—	—	—	—
3	(Scotland) Glasgow KC	3	1	0	0	2	45	42	+3	3	5–8th place bracket	—	10–15	—	—
4	(Wales) Newport Centurions	3	0	0	0	3	9	93	−84	0	5–8th place bracket	1–45	3–20	5–28	—

Source: IKF

==== Group B ====
Pos	Team	Pld	W	OTW	OTL	L	GF	GA	GD	Pts	Qualification	(Turkey) KOC (Note: Due to visa issues, Kocaeli University was allowed to play, but was disqualified from reaching the next round and finished last.)	(Slovakia) DOL	(Wales) CAR	(England) TOR
1	(Turkey) Kocaeli University (Note: Due to visa issues, Kocaeli University was allowed to play, but was disqualified from reaching the next round and finished last.)	3	3	0	0	0	59	37	+22	9	5–8th place bracket	—	—	—	—
2	(Slovakia) Dolphins Prievidza	3	2	0	0	1	43	48	−5	6	Semifinals	13–23	—	—	—
3	(Wales) Cardiff City KC (H)	3	1	0	0	2	31	37	−6	3	Semifinals	12–22	9–10	—	10–5
4	(England) Tornadoes KC	3	0	0	0	3	33	44	−11	0	5–8th place bracket	12–14	16–20	—	—

Source: IKF
(H) Host

=== 5–8th place bracket ===
No matter the result, Kocaeli University will be deemed as the loser.

5–8th place semifinals
23 September
(Scotland) Glasgow KC	13
(Turkey) Kocaeli University	15
23 September
(England) Tornadoes KC	29
(Wales) Newport Centurions	5

Fifth place
24 September
(Scotland) Glasgow KC	14
(England) Tornadoes KC	18
Seventh place
24 September
(Turkey) Kocaeli University	24
(Wales) Newport Centurions	4

=== 1–4th place bracket ===
Semifinals
23 September
(Portugal) CC Oeiras	27
(Wales) Cardiff City KC	5
23 September
(Slovakia) Dolphins Prievidza	12
(France) FJEP Bonson	15

Final
24 September
(Portugal) CC Oeiras	23
(France) FJEP Bonson	4
Third place
24 September
(Wales) Cardiff City KC	13
(Slovakia) Dolphins Prievidza	14

=== Final rankings ===
FJEP Bonson and Dolphins Prievidza originally qualified for the Satellite Cup, but later withdrew and Kocaeli University took one of the vacant spaces.

Rank	Team
Gold medal	(Portugal) CC Oeiras
Silver medal	(France) FJEP Bonson
Bronze medal	(Slovakia) Dolphins Prievidza
4	(Wales) Cardiff City KC
5	(England) Tornadoes KC
6	(Scotland) Glasgow KC
7	(Wales) Newport Centurions
8	(Turkey) Kocaeli University

== Round 2 ==
The group winners qualify for the Champions League, while the teams who finish second and third qualify for the Challenger Cup.

=== Draw ===
The draw was on 24 August 2023. H indicates which club is hosting the groups. The teams from Round 1 were not known at the time of the draw.

Pot 1	Pot 2	Pot 3	Pot 4	Pot 5
(Czech Republic) KCC České Budějovice (England) Bec KC	(Portugal) NC Benfica (Catalonia) KC Barcelona	(England) Trojans KC (Catalonia) Platja d'Aro KC	(Czech Republic) KK Brno (Poland) Marcovia Marki (H)	Group A Winner; Group B Winner

=== Group A ===
7–10 September 2023, Hannover, Germany

Pos	Team	Pld	W	OTW	OTL	L	GF	GA	GD	Pts	Qualification	(Portugal) BEN	(Poland) MAR	(England) TRO	(Catalonia) VAL	(Czech Republic) CES
1	(Portugal) NC Benfica	4	4	0	0	0	85	44	+41	12	Champions League	—	—	16–8	—	—
2	(Poland) Marcovia Marki (H)	4	2	0	0	2	63	69	−6	6 (Note: Marcovia Marki 18–13 Trojans KC)	Challenger Cup	11–24	—	18–13	19–14	15–18
3	(England) Trojans KC	4	2	0	0	2	54	56	−2	6	Challenger Cup	—	—	—	—	—
4	(Catalonia) CK Vallparadís	4	1	0	0	3	55	72	−17	3 (Note: CK Vallparadís 15–13 KCC České Budějovice)		14–25	—	12–15	—	15–13
5	(Czech Republic) KCC České Budějovice	4	1	0	0	3	52	68	−16	3		11–20	—	10–18	—	—

Source: IKF
(H) Host

=== Group B ===
7–10 September 2023, Kragujevac, Serbia

Pos	Team	Pld	W	OTW	OTL	L	GF	GA	GD	Pts	Qualification	(Portugal) OEI	(Catalonia) BAR	(Czech Republic) BRN	(England) BEC	(Catalonia) PLA
1	(Portugal) CC Oeiras	4	3	0	0	1	63	57	+6	9 (Note: CC Oeiras 19–16 KC Barcelona)	Champions League	—	19–16	—	9–14	21–15
2	(Catalonia) KC Barcelona	4	3	0	0	1	76	67	+9	9	Challenger Cup	—	—	20–15	—	20–15
3	(Czech Republic) KK Brno	4	2	0	0	2	62	61	+1	6 (Note: KK Brno 22–17 Bec KC)	Challenger Cup	12–14	—	—	—	—
4	(England) Bec KC	4	2	0	0	2	69	66	+3	6		—	18–20	17–22	—	20–15
5	(Catalonia) Platja d'Aro KC	4	0	0	0	4	55	74	−19	0		—	—	10–13	—	—

Source: IKF

== Champions League ==
The Champions League was held in Papendrecht, Netherlands at the PKC Hall. The competition was played between the 7–10 February.

=== Draw ===
The draw was on 14 December 2023.

Pot 1	Pot 2	Pot 3
(Netherlands) PKC/Vertom (H) (Belgium) Boeckenberg KC	(Germany) TuS Schildgen (Germany) SG Pegasus	(Portugal) NC Benfica (Portugal) CC Oeiras

==== Original groups ====
Group A	Group B
(Belgium) Boeckenberg KC (Germany) SG Pegasus (Portugal) NC Benfica	(Netherlands) PKC/Vertom (Germany) TuS Schildgen (Portugal) CC Oeiras

=== Withdrawal of CC Oeiras ===
The top two from each group would've progressed to the semifinals, but the sudden withdrawal of CC Oeiras on 16 January 2024 meant the format changed for the event. Instead, the remaining five teams played a Round Robin to decide the champion.

=== Group Standings ===
7–10 February 2024, Papendrecht, Netherlands

Pos	Team	Pld	W	OTW	OTL	L	GF	GA	GD	Pts	Qualification	(Netherlands) VER	(Belgium) BOE	(Portugal) BEN	(Germany) SCH	(Germany) PEG
1	(Netherlands) PKC/Vertom (H)	4	4	0	0	0	132	53	+79	12	Champions	—	25–17	36–14	33–12	38–10
2	(Belgium) Boeckenberg KC	4	3	0	0	1	106	62	+44	9		—	—	30–14	30–12	29–11
3	(Portugal) NC Benfica	4	2	0	0	2	72	90	−18	6		—	—	—	—	—
4	(Germany) TuS Schildgen	4	1	0	0	3	56	91	−35	3		—	—	9–16	—	23–12
5	(Germany) SG Pegasus	4	0	0	0	4	48	118	−70	0		—	—	15–28	—	—

Source: IKF
(H) Host

7 February 2024; 19:00	TuS Schildgen (Germany)	23–12	(Germany) SG Pegasus	PKC Hall, Papendrecht
7 February 2024; 19:00	Heppekausen 9	(12–4)	Düring, Gerlich 3	PKC Hall, Papendrecht
7 February 2024; 19:00		Report		PKC Hall, Papendrecht

7 February 2024; 21:00	Boeckenberg KC (Belgium)	30–14	(Portugal) NC Benfica	PKC Hall, Papendrecht
7 February 2024; 21:00	de Ridder 5	(13–9)	Vasconcelos Luz 4	PKC Hall, Papendrecht
7 February 2024; 21:00		Report		PKC Hall, Papendrecht

8 February 2024; 16:30	PKC/Vertom (Netherlands)	33–12	(Germany) TuS Schildgen	PKC Hall, Papendrecht
8 February 2024; 16:30	Kunst 7	(14–6)	Altgassen, Freund 3	PKC Hall, Papendrecht
8 February 2024; 16:30		Report		PKC Hall, Papendrecht

8 February 2024; 18:30	Boeckenberg KC (Belgium)	29–11	(Germany) SG Pegasus	PKC Hall, Papendrecht
8 February 2024; 18:30	Thijs, de Vogelaere 7	(18–4)	Orth 5	PKC Hall, Papendrecht
8 February 2024; 18:30		Report		PKC Hall, Papendrecht

8 February 2024; 20:30	PKC/Vertom (Netherlands)	36–14	(Portugal) NC Benfica	PKC Hall, Papendrecht
8 February 2024; 20:30	van der Werff 6	(17–6)	Vasconcelos Luz 4	PKC Hall, Papendrecht
8 February 2024; 20:30		Report		PKC Hall, Papendrecht

9 February 2024; 16:30	SG Pegasus (Germany)	15–28	(Portugal) NC Benfica	PKC Hall, Papendrecht
9 February 2024; 16:30	Düring, Gebhardt 3	(11–14)	Vasconcelos Luz 8	PKC Hall, Papendrecht
9 February 2024; 16:30		Report		PKC Hall, Papendrecht

9 February 2024; 18:30	Boeckenberg KC (Belgium)	30–12	(Germany) TuS Schildgen	PKC Hall, Papendrecht
9 February 2024; 18:30	van Gorp 5	(14–8)	Jan Heming, Küpper 3	PKC Hall, Papendrecht
9 February 2024; 18:30		Report		PKC Hall, Papendrecht

9 February 2024; 20:30	PKC/Vertom (Netherlands)	38–10	(Germany) SG Pegasus	PKC Hall, Papendrecht
9 February 2024; 20:30	van Het Kaar 8	(20–4)	three players 2	PKC Hall, Papendrecht
9 February 2024; 20:30		Report		PKC Hall, Papendrecht

10 February 2024; 14:00	TuS Schildgen (Germany)	9–16	(Portugal) NC Benfica	PKC Hall, Papendrecht
10 February 2024; 14:00	three players 2	(3–8)	Vasconcelos Luz 4	PKC Hall, Papendrecht
10 February 2024; 14:00		Report		PKC Hall, Papendrecht

10 February 2024; 16:00	PKC/Vertom (Netherlands)	25–17	(Belgium) Boeckenberg KC	PKC Hall, Papendrecht
10 February 2024; 16:00	Oppe 7	(12–9)	Thijs, Van Gorp 4	PKC Hall, Papendrecht
10 February 2024; 16:00		Report		PKC Hall, Papendrecht

2023–24 IKF Europe Korfball Champions League Champions

PKC/Vertom
Second title

== See also ==
- 2023–24 IKF Europe Challenger Cup
- 2023–24 IKF Europe Satellite Cup
