= Oğuz Alper Öktem =

Turkish entrepreneur and businesspeople (born 1991)

- Oğuz Alper Öktem
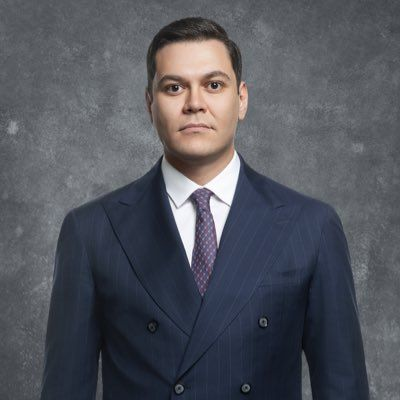
- Born: January 10, 1991 (age 35) istanbul
- Citizenship: Turkey
- Education: London School of Economics; University of Chicago
- Organization: Marti
- Family: Sena Öktem (sister)

Oğuz Alper Öktem (born January 10, 1991 istanbul) is a Turkish entrepreneur, businessperson, equestrian and the founder of Martı. Öktem is also known for his efforts to legalize the ride-hailing he established to address the taxi problem in Istanbul.

== Education Life ==
Oğuz Alper Öktem was born on January 10, 1991, in Kocaeli. In 2009, he graduated from the Vehbi Koç Foundation Koç High School, where he received a full scholarship. He then completed his undergraduate degree in economics at the University of Chicago in three years with honors. He also completed a master's program in political economy at the London School of Economics, where he served as the president of the LSE Turkish Society during his time there.

== Career ==
Shortly after graduating, he worked at Deutsche Bank's London office. In 2014, upon his return to Istanbul, he started working as the Chief Operating Officer at BluTV. Subsequently, he worked at McKinsey & Company and was among the investors of Kolektif House. In November 2018, thinking that micro mobility would offer a very important transportation solution for Istanbul, he founded Martı Technologies with his sister, Sena Öktem. The company's shares began trading on the New York Stock Exchange on July 13, 2023, and Oğuz Alper Öktem rang the gong. Öktem has been awarded "Entrepreneur of the Year" in many award programs.

=== Sports career ===
Öktem competes in the endurance discipline of equestrianism as a rider for Kemer Country Club. He began competing in national events in 2025 and competed in the Turkish Endurance Championship that same year.

In 2026, Öktem began competing at the international level and participated in events held in France. In July, he completed a CEI1* event in Barre-des-Cévennes, earning the right to become a national team athlete for Turkey.

In August 2026, Öktem was selected for the Turkish national equestrian team by the Equestrian Federation of Turkey. He is scheduled to represent Turkey at the Balkan Championships in Buftea, Romania, in September 2026.

== Awards ==
- Webrazzi Awards 2019 and 2020 - Entrepreneur of the Year
- GQ Men Of The Year 2021 - Entrepreneur Of The Year
- Yıldız Technical University Stars of the Year - Most Admired Male Business Person of the Year

== Personal life ==
Oğuz Alper Öktem was married in 2021, and the marriage ended in 2023. He has no children from this marriage. His sister, Sena Öktem, is a founding partner of Martı.
