= IKF Europe Korfball Champions League =

International korfball competition

Korfball Champions League
- Current season, competition or edition: 2025–26 IKF Europe Korfball Champions League
- Sport: Korfball
- Founded: 2022; 4 years ago
- First season: 2022-23
- Administrator: IKF Europe
- Confederation: International Korfball Federation
- Most recent champion: PKC (4th title) (2025–26)
- Most titles: PKC (4 titles)
- Broadcaster: Youtube IKFchannel (livestreams)

The IKF Europe Korfball Champions League is the main annual korfball competition for clubs in Europe organized by the International Korfball Federation.

== History ==
The IKF Europe Korfball Champions League has been announced by the IKF on 25 January 2022 and is meant as a replacement for the IKF Europa Cup and IKF Europa Shield competitions.

== Format ==
3 Round.

== Results ==
KCL Finals
Year	Host	Winners	Runners-up	Third Place	Fourth Place
2022–23	(Netherlands) Delft	(Netherlands) PKC/Vertom	(Netherlands) Fortuna/Delta Logistiek	(Belgium) KC Floriant	(Belgium) KC Borgerhout
2023–24	(Netherlands) Papendrecht	(Netherlands) PKC/Vertom	(Belgium) Boeckenberg KC	(Portugal) NC Benfica	(Germany) TuS Schildgen
2024–25	(Portugal) Lisbon	(Netherlands) PKC/Vertom	(Belgium) KC Borgerhout	(England) Bec Korfball Club	(Portugal) NC Benfica
2025–26	(Portugal) Lisbon	(Netherlands) PKC/Vertom	(Belgium) Boeckenberg KC	(England) Bec Korfball Club	(Czech Republic) KK Brno

KCL Challenger Finals
Year	Host	Winners	Runners-up	Third Place	Fourth Place
2022–23	(Germany) Bergisch Gladbach	(Germany) TuS Schildgen	(Germany) SG Pegasus	(Czech Republic) SK RG Prostejov	(England) Trojans KC
2023–24	(Portugal) Lisbon	(Czech Republic) KK Brno	(England) Trojans KC	(Poland) Markovia Marki	(Catalonia) KC Barcelona
2024–25	(Turkey) Kocaeli	(Czech Republic) Vosime.cz K. Prostějov	—N/a	—N/a	—N/a
2025–26	(Turkey) Kemer	(Catalonia) KC Barcelona	(Hungary) Guardians SC	(Portugal) CCCD Carnaxide	(Poland) Defenders Wroclaw

KCL Satellite Finals
Year	Host	Winners	Runners-up	Third Place	Fourth Place
2022–23	(Catalonia) Terrassa	(Portugal) NC Benfica	(Catalonia) CK Vallparadis	(England) Tornadoes KC	—N/a
2023–24	(Turkey) Antalya	(Germany) Schweriner KC	(Portugal) CCCD Carnaxide	(Turkey) Kocaeli Univ. SC	(Turkey) Yıldız Tech. Univ. SC
2024–25	(Turkey) Kocaeli	(Hungary) Guardians SC	(Turkey) Kocaeli Univ. SC	(Turkey) Marmara Univ. SC	—N/a
2025–26	(Portugal) Lisbon	(Catalonia) CK Castellbisbal	(Turkey) Kocaeli Univ. SC	(Slovakia) SKK Prievidza Dolphins	(Turkey) Şeker06 Sports Club

== Performance by club ==
KCL Finals
#	Club	Nation	Winners	Runners-up	Third place
1	PKC	Netherlands	4	0	0
2	KC Boeckenberg	Belgium	0	2	0
3	KC Borgerhout	Belgium	0	1	0
3	Fortuna	Netherlands	0	1	0
5	Bec Korfball Club	England	0	0	1
5	NC Benfica	Portugal	0	0	1
5	KC Floriant	Belgium	0	0	1

KCL Challenger Finals
#	Club	Nation	Winners	Runners-up	Third place
1	KC Barcelona	Catalonia	1	0	0
1	Vosime.cz K. Prostějov	Czech Republic	1	0	0
1	TuS Schildgen	Germany	1	0	0
1	KK Brno	Czech Republic	1	0	0
4	Guardians SC	Hungary	0	1	0
4	SG Pegasus	Germany	0	1	0
4	Trojans KC	England	0	1	0
6	CCCD Carnaxide	Portugal	0	0	1
6	SK RG Prostejov	Czech Republic	0	0	1
6	Markovia Marki	Poland	0	0	1

KCL Satellite Finals
#	Club	Nation	Winners	Runners-up	Third place
1	Guardians SC	Hungary	1	0	0
1	NC Benfica	Portugal	1	0	0
1	Schweriner KC	Germany	1	0	0
1	CK Castellbisbal	Catalonia	1	0	0
4	Kocaeli Univ. SC	Turkey	0	2	1
5	CK Vallparadis	Catalonia	0	1	0
5	CCCD Carnaxide	Portugal	0	1	0
7	Tornadoes KC	England	0	0	1
7	SKK Prievidza Dolphins	Slovakia	0	0	1
