= 2023–24 IKF Europe Challenger Cup =

European korfball tournament

IKF Europe Challenger Cup
- 2023–24
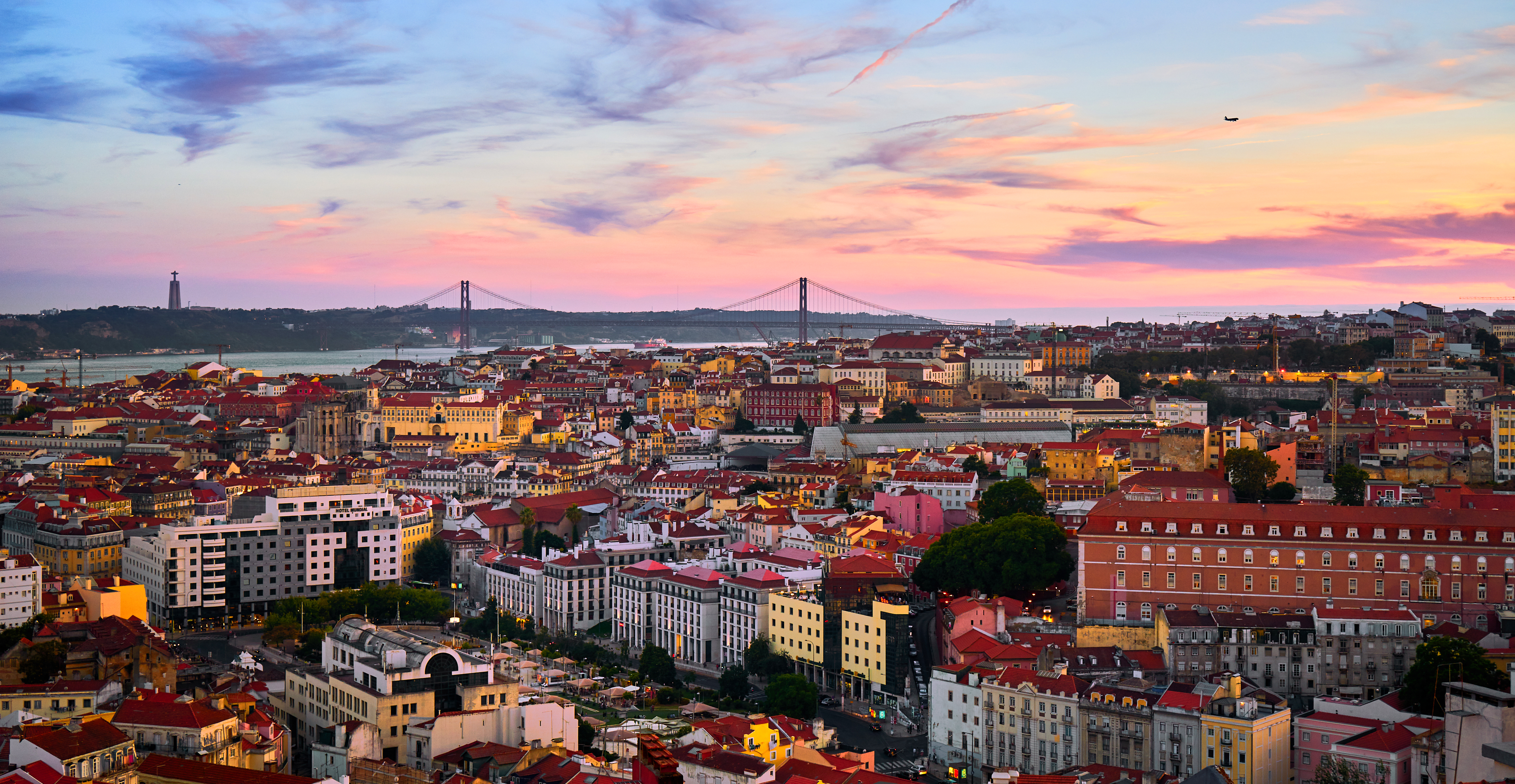
- The event was held in Lisbon.

Tournament information
- Sport: Korfball
- Dates: 26–28 January 2024
- Host: Lisbon
- Teams: 4
- Website: IKF Europe Challenger Cup

Final positions
- Champions: (Czech Republic) KK Brno (1st title)
- Runner-up: (England) Trojans KC

Tournament statistics
- Matches played: 6

The 2023–24 IKF Europe Challenger Cup is the 2nd edition of IKF's second-tier competition for Korfball clubs. TuS Schildgen are the defending champions, but could not defend their title after in the final round in the Champions League.

KK Brno won the event after finishing first in the group.

== Host selection ==
On 30 December 2023, Lisbon were given the hosting rights.

== Format ==
Four teams play each other in a round robin format where the group winners would win the Challenger Cup.

== Teams ==
Teams who finished second and third in Round 2 of the Champions League qualified for the Challenger Cup.

Team	Qualification
(Poland) Marcovia Marki	Finished 2nd in Round 2 Group A.
(England) Trojans KC	Finished 3rd in Round 2 Group A.
(Catalonia) KC Barcelona	Finished 2nd in Round 2 Group B.
(Czech Republic) KK Brno	Finished 3rd in Round 2 Group B.

== Group stage ==
Pos	Team	Pld	W	OTW	OTL	L	GF	GA	GD	Pts	Qualification
1	(Czech Republic) KK Brno	3	2	0	0	1	58	46	+12	6 (Note: KK Brno 20–13 Trojans KC)	Champion
2	(England) Trojans KC	3	2	0	0	1	49	50	−1	6	
3	(Poland) Marcovia Marki	3	1	0	0	2	41	52	−11	3 (Note: Marcovia Marki 16–15 KC Barcelona)	
4	(Catalonia) KC Barcelona	3	1	0	0	2	53	53	0	3	

Source: IKF
Notes:

26 January 2024; 18:00	Trojans KC (England)	19–17	(Catalonia) KC Barcelona	Lisbon
26 January 2024; 18:00	Brooks 5	(8–7)	Sanchez 5	Lisbon
26 January 2024; 18:00		Report		Lisbon

26 January 2024; 19:45	Marcovia Marki (Poland)	12–20	(Czech Republic) KK Brno	Lisbon
26 January 2024; 19:45	Musialinski, Siemieniuk 3	(5–8)	Holik 4	Lisbon
26 January 2024; 19:45		Report		Lisbon

27 January 2024; 11:15	Marcovia Marki (Poland)	13–17	(England) Trojans KC	Lisbon
27 January 2024; 11:15	three players 3	(10–10)	Brooks 9	Lisbon
27 January 2024; 11:15		Report		Lisbon

27 January 2024; 13:00	KC Barcelona (Catalonia)	21–18	(Czech Republic) KK Brno	Lisbon
27 January 2024; 13:00	Sanchez 7	(7–9)	Carvasova, Theissig 4	Lisbon
27 January 2024; 13:00		Report		Lisbon

28 January 2024; 10:30	KK Brno (Czech Republic)	20–13	(England) Trojans KC	Lisbon
28 January 2024; 10:30	Theissig 6	(9–6)	Brooks 4	Lisbon
28 January 2024; 10:30		Report		Lisbon

28 January 2024; 12:15	KC Barcelona (Catalonia)	15–16	(Poland) Marcovia Marki	Lisbon
28 January 2024; 12:15	Sanchez 5	(6–9)	Ploszka, Musialinski 4	Lisbon
28 January 2024; 12:15		Report		Lisbon

2023–24 IKF Europe Challenger Cup Champions

KK Brno
First title

== See also ==
- 2023–24 IKF Europe Korfball Champions League
- 2023–24 IKF Europe Satellite Cup
