= Davutpaşa Barracks =

Building in Turkey

- Davutpaşa Kışlası
- Davutpaşa, Esenler, Istanbul, Turkey
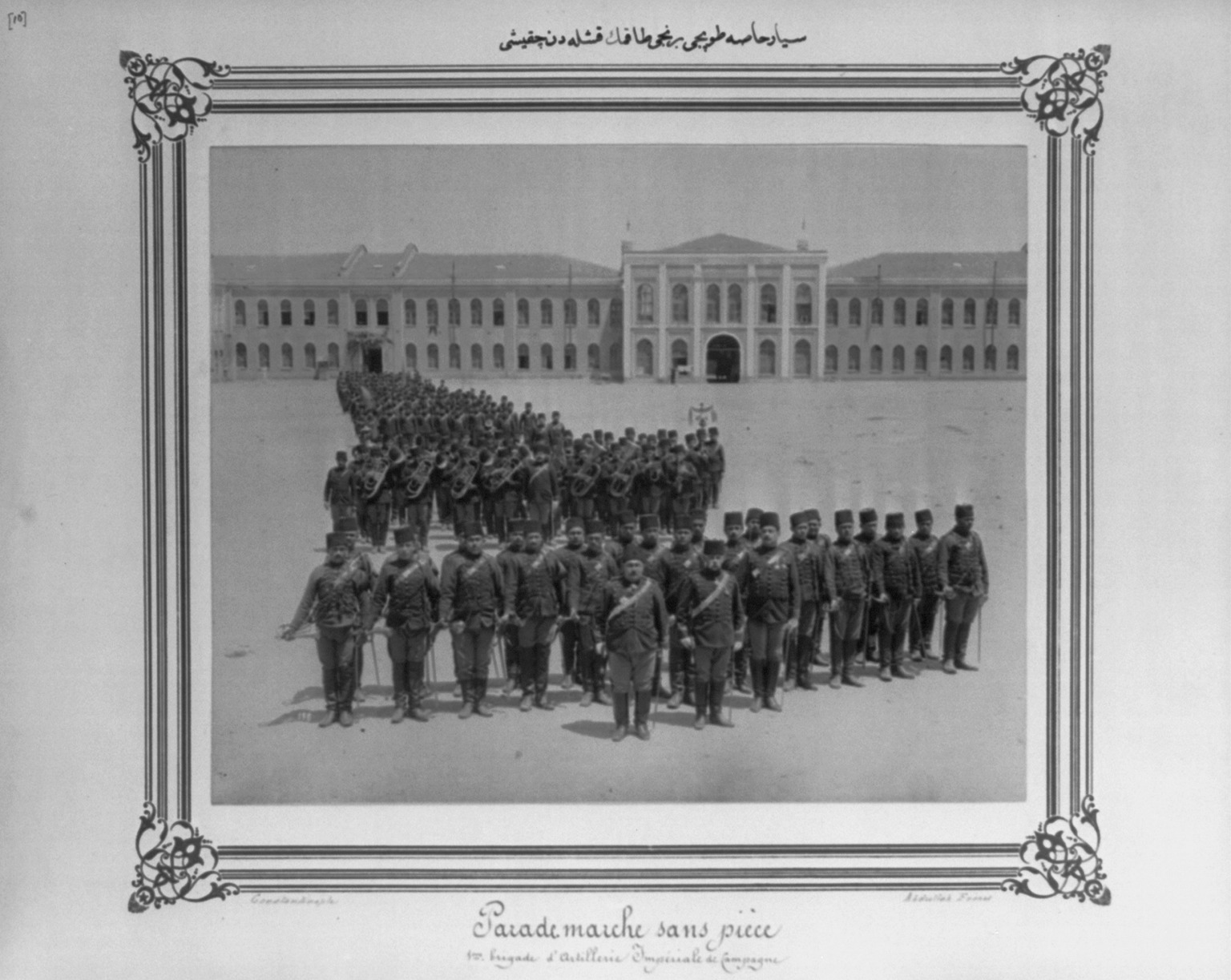
- Davutpaşa Barracks and Ottoman Army soldiers (1826–1893)

Site information
- Owner: Yıldız Technical University
- Condition: Redeveloped

Location
- Location within Istanbul
- Coordinates: 41°01′33″N 28°53′21″E

Site history
- Built: 1826; 200 years ago
- Built by: Sultan Mahmud II
- Materials: stone

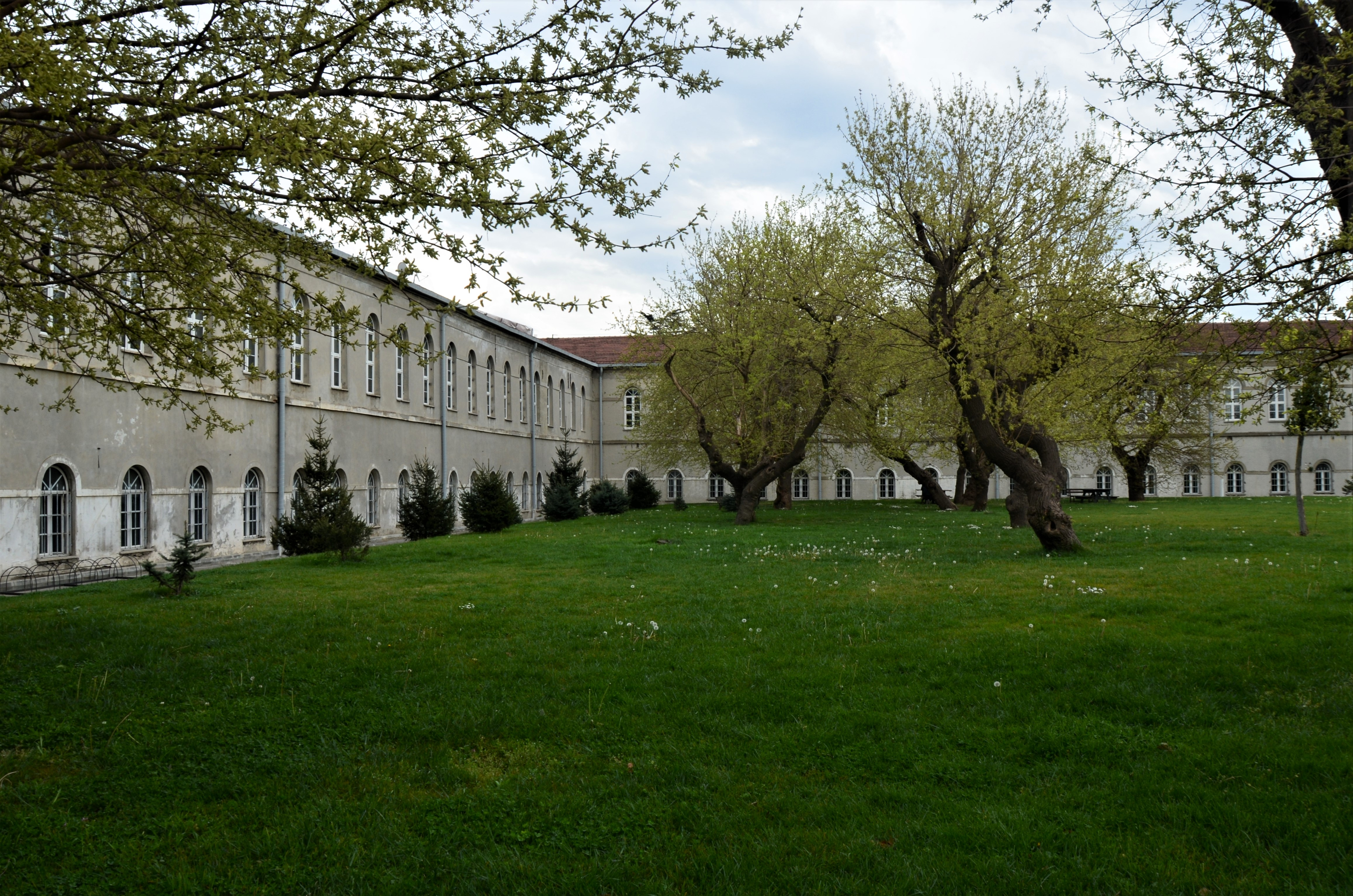
A view of the Davutpaşa Barracks seen from the courtyard. Today main building of Yıldız Technical University.

Davutpaşa Barracks (Turkish: Davutpaşa Kışlası) were Ottoman Army barracks built in the 1800s and located at Davutpaşa neighborhood of Esenler district on the European part of Istanbul, Turkey. The building was used later as a shelter for immigrants during the Balkan Wars and as a military hospital during World War I. During the bombings of Istanbul, the area was bombed by the British forces. Today, it serves as a campus of Yıldız Technical University after its redevelopment.
