= Korfbal Club Barcelona =

Korfbal club in Barcelona, Spain

The Korfbal Club Barcelona (KCB) is the first korfball club of Barcelona, founded on 5 June 2006.

== History ==
The Korfball Club Barcelona was founded on June 5, 2006 by a group of locals korfball players, and started playing on the Second National Division on 26 November that year. In 2007, during the first season since its foundation, the team achieved promotion to the National First Division (now the National League). After reaching an agreement with the Sports Department of the City of Sant Cugat hand councilor Xavier Cortés during those years, this place was occupied Korfball Club Sant Cugat, which was a subsidiary since that time. Membership remained until the 2010/11 season, and from the 2011-12 season the KC Barcelona team returns to the National League.

In the summer of 2012 the club contracted Albert Vidaña, former Catalan National Team coach and member of the IKF, as first team coach and coordinator of the technical structure. In his first season, the club won the champion National League and was runner-up of the Catalan Cup.

== Competitions ==
The different teams from the club participate in the Catalan Korfball League, from the National League to the novice category.

== Staff ==
=== Players of first team 2007-2008 ===
- 3 Jordi Giménez Garcia
- 4 Aitor Huguet Navarro
- 6 Marta Karima El-Morabet López
- 7 Joan Carles Bartra Vidal
- 8 Jordi Martinez Rivera
- 9 Oliver Francesc Domínguez Quero
- 10 Berta Aloma Sese
- 11 Marta Ortíz Roca
- 12 Julia Hereza Atienza
- 13 Magic O'Brayan Parra Alcalde
- 14 Javier Navarro Sánchez
- 15 Mireia Figuera Sala
- Trainers Jonathan Malo Ruiz and Cristina Ruiz Martin

=== International players ===
- Jonathan Malo Ruiz, trainer of the Catalan Selection under '16 (2006 and 2007). Before he played with the Catalan Selections under '19 (1998), under’21 (2002) and under’ 23 (1996, 1998).
- Javier Navarro Sánchez, international with the Catalan Selection under '19 (2007).
- Berta Alomà Sesé, international with the Catalan Selection under '16 (2006 and 2007).
- Magic O'Brayan Parra Alcalde, international with the Catalan Selection under '16 (2006, 2007 and 2008) and under '19 (2009).
- Mireia Figuera Sala, international with the Catalan Selection under '16 (2006, 2007, 2008) and under '19 (2009).
- Julia Hereza Atienza, international with the Catalan Selection under '16 (2007).
- Joan Carles Bartra Vidal, international with the Catalan Selection under '16 (2006).

== Awards ==
- 2006-2007 - Third classified of the group A of the second national division.
