= Martı (company) =

Turkish mobility technology company

Marti Technologies, Inc.

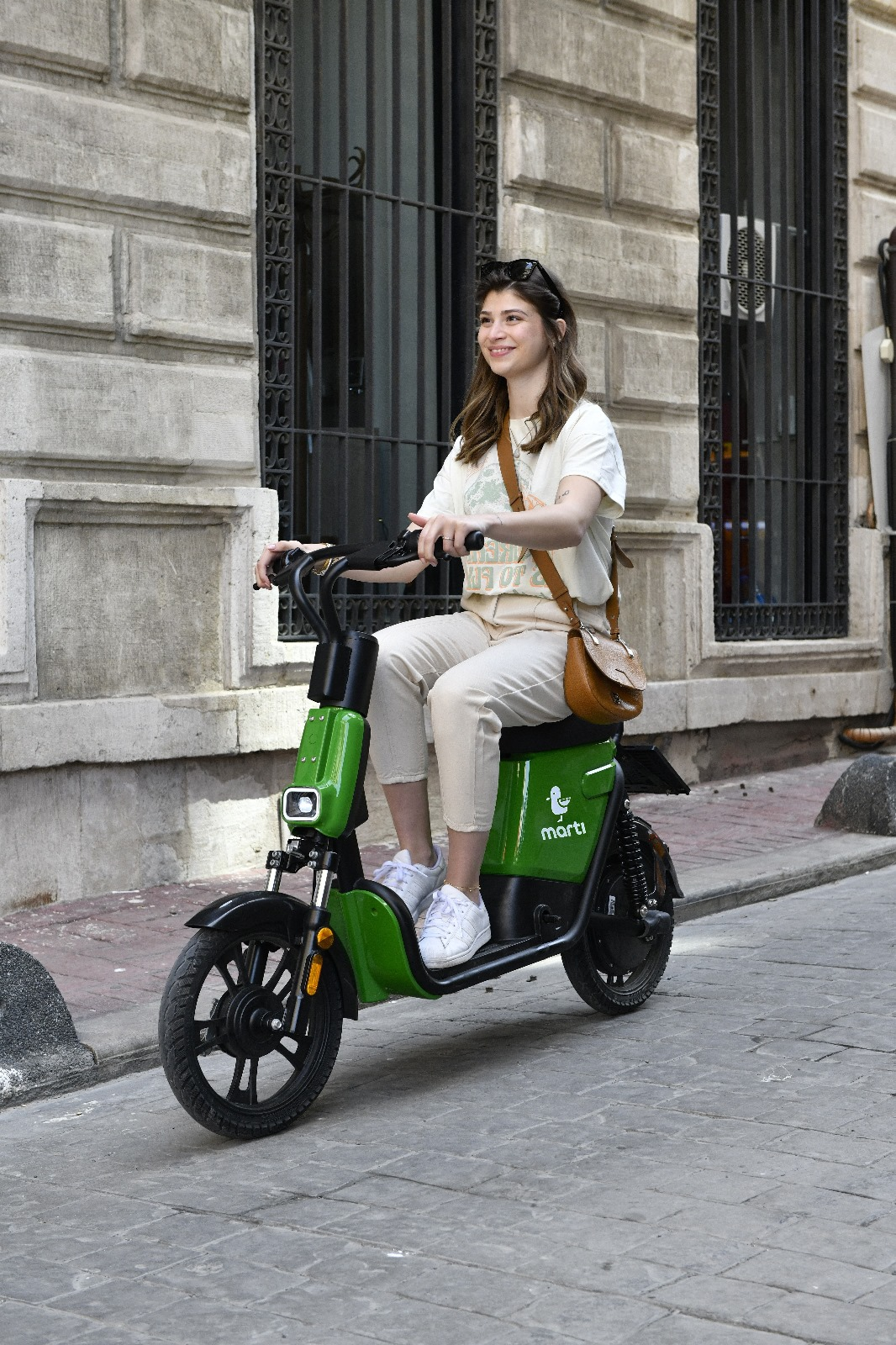
- Native name: Martı İleri Teknoloji A.Ş.
- Traded as: NYSE: MRT
- Industry: Technology
- Founded: 2018
- Founders: Oğuz Alper Öktem; Sena Öktem; Cankut Durgun
- Headquarters: Istanbul, Türkiye
- Area served: Türkiye
- Products: Ride-hailing; Motorcycle-hailing; Taxi-hailing; Delivery; Electric scooter rental E-bike rental Electric moped rental
- Brands: Martı; Martı TAG; Martı Kurye; Zoba
- Revenue: US$35.4M (H1 2026); US$85M (FY2026 guidance)
- Operating income: US$-3.8M (H1 2026)
- Net income: US$-19.9M (H1 2026)
- Total assets: US$32.4M (H1 2026)
- Total equity: US$−83.8 million (H1 2026)
- Website: www.marti.tech

Marti Technologies, Inc. commonly known as Marti, is a Turkish mobility technology company headquartered in Istanbul. Through its mobile application, the company operates ride-hailing services that match riders with car and motorcycle drivers, taxi-hailing services, delivery services, and a fleet of rental e-mopeds, e-bikes and e-scooters. All of the company's offerings are serviced by proprietary software systems and IoT infrastructure.

The company was founded in 2018 by Oğuz Alper Öktem, Sena Öktem and Cankut Durgun. Marti listed on the New York Stock Exchange in July 2023, becoming the first Turkish company to list directly on the NYSE and began trading on NYSE American under the ticker MRT.

As of August 2026, Marti's ride-hailing service operated in 30 cities representing approximately 85% of Türkiye's gross domestic product. By June 2026, the service had surpassed 4.40 million all-time unique riders and 544,000 registered drivers. In the second quarter of 2026, the number of trips made through Marti's platform increased by 73.2% compared with the same period of the previous year, reaching 18.78 million.

== History ==
Marti was founded in 2018 by Oğuz Alper Öktem, Sena Öktem and Cankut Durgun and launched its shared electric vehicle services in Istanbul in 2019. The service subsequently expanded to other major cities in Türkiye. In 2022, the company entered the ride-hailing market with its Martı TAG service. At the time, Istanbul, with a population of approximately 16 million, was served by approximately 20,000 taxis.

On July 11th 2023, Marti completed its business combination with Galata Acquisition Corp. and began trading on NYSE American under the ticker MRT.Two days later, Oğuz Alper Öktem rang the opening bell at the New York Stock Exchange. The listing was later recognized as the International Equity Capital Markets Deal of the Year at the Bonds, Loans & ESG Capital Markets CEE, CIS & Türkiye Awards.

At the end of 2023, Marti operated 34,585 electric scooters, electric bicycles and electric mopeds. In February 2024, the company acquired the assets of Boston-based Zoba, an artificial intelligence company that develops solutions for two-wheeled electric vehicle operations and fleet optimization.

In October 2024, Marti introduced platform subscription packages as part of its monetization model.

During 2025, Marti expanded its ride-hailing service from its initial four markets to 20 cities, which the company said represented approximately 80% of Türkiye's GDP. In September 2025, Marti was added to the S&P Global Broad Market Index. In October 2025, Marti launched same-hour package delivery services under the Martı Kurye name.

In July 2026, Marti announced a multi-year strategic partnership with Silicon Valley-based autonomous vehicle company Tensor to deploy Level 4 autonomous vehicles through the Marti platform. In the second quarter of 2026, the company reported positive adjusted EBITDA for the first time since becoming publicly traded. In August 2026, the ride-hailing service expanded to 10 additional cities, bringing its total footprint to 30 cities representing approximately 85% of Türkiye's GDP.

== Services ==
=== Ride-hailing ===
Marti's ride-hailing service, Marti TAG, matches riders with registered car, motorcycle, and taxi drivers through the Marti app.

By the end of 2025, Marti 's ride-hailing service had reached 3.38 million all-time unique riders and 450,000 registered drivers, representing year-over-year growth of 103% and 72%, respectively. By June 2026, the service had reached 4.30 million riders and 532,000 registered drivers. In Istanbul alone, Marti counted more than 351,000 registered drivers, compared with roughly 20,000 taxis serving the city.

As of August 2026, the service operated in Istanbul, Ankara, İzmir, Kocaeli, Bursa, Antalya, Konya, Adana, Mersin, Gaziantep, Tekirdağ, Manisa, Kayseri, Muğla, Sakarya, Samsun, Eskişehir, Denizli, Aydın, Yalova, Balıkesir, Çanakkale, Edirne, Erzurum, Hatay, Kahramanmaraş, Sivas, Şanlıurfa, Trabzon and Van. The share of riders outside Istanbul increased from 35% in August 2025 to 45% in August 2026, while the share of registered drivers outside Istanbul rose from 25% to 36% over the same period.

According to McKinsey & Company, Türkiye's taxi market was estimated at $9–12 billion in 2021, while the ride-hailing market was projected to reach approximately $15–20 billion by 2030. Marti estimates that Türkiye's ride-hailing market represents up to $4 billion in annual revenue potential.

Marti has advocated for formal regulation of ride-hailing in Türkiye. In 2023, Oğuz Alper Öktem submitted 376,000 petitions to the Istanbul Metropolitan Municipality in support of a shared-ride regulation.

=== Delivery ===
In October 2025, Marti launched same-hour package delivery services under the Martı Kurye name, opening its platform to businesses and consumers through its existing driver network and user base. Independent estimates cited in connection with the launch placed Türkiye's urban package delivery market at more than 200 million deliveries annually, representing an estimated annual revenue opportunity of approximately US$400 million.

By the first quarter of 2026, 51% of Marti's motorcycle drivers and 23% of its car drivers in Istanbul were offering delivery services.

=== Two-wheeled electric vehicles ===
Marti operates a shared micromobility fleet consisting of rental e-mopeds, e-bikes and e-scooters. The fleet is managed through the company's IoT infrastructure and field operations teams. In 2025, Marti deployed an average of approximately 23,000 vehicles per day while gradually retiring older vehicles and selectively expanding the service to additional cities.

Users locate vehicles through the Marti application and unlock them by scanning a QR code after entering payment information. Riders are charged at the beginning of the journey and for each minute of vehicle use. Electric scooters and electric bicycles have a maximum permitted speed of 25 km/h, while electric mopeds may travel at up to 45 km/h. Battery replacements and other field operations are carried out by Marti's field teams.

=== Autonomous vehicles ===
In July 2026, Marti and Tensor announced a multi-year strategic partnership under which Marti plans to purchase Tensor Level 4 autonomous vehicles and deploy them through its platform in cities across Türkiye. Following deployment, users are expected to be able to request autonomous vehicles directly through the Marti application. The partnership aims to introduce autonomous ride-hailing services in Türkiye. At the time of the announcement, Marti reported approximately 7.8 million all-time unique platform consumers. GlobalData described the agreement as positioning Türkiye as a testing ground for Level 4 autonomous ride-hailing services.

== Awards ==
- International Equity Capital Markets Deal of the Year – Bonds, Loans & ESG Capital Markets CEE, CIS & Türkiye Awards – 2023, for Marti's NYSE public listing.
