= Kocaeli University =

Turkish public university located in Kocaeli

Coordinates: 40.7661°N 29.9394°E

- Kocaeli Üniversitesi
- Motto: Educating, researching, and producing for Turkey
- Type: State university
- Established: 1976 (as Academy of Engineering and Architecture of Kocaeli); 1992 (as Kocaeli University)
- Affiliations: European University Association
- Rector: Prof. Dr. Nuh Zafer Cantürk
- Students: 63.886
- Location: İzmit, Kocaeli, Turkey
- Language: Turkish, English
- Colours: Green Black
- Website: www.kocaeli.edu.tr

Kocaeli University (Turkish: Kocaeli Üniversitesi) is a state university in İzmit, Turkey. It was founded as the Academy of Engineering and Architecture of Kocaeli in 1976. The electrical and mechanical engineering departments, basic sciences, and department of modern languages were the original departments of the academy. It became a part of Yıldız University in 1982, and split from it in 1992.

In July 1992, the Turkish government decided to build 22 universities nationwide, including Kocaeli University. Before the 1999 İzmit earthquake, which can be regarded as the turning point for the rebirth of the university, Kocaeli University had approximately 20,000 students, 1,150 educational staff, and a campus of 650,000 square meters. Kocaeli University lost nearly 75% of its physical structure in the earthquake, but its prior expansion site, Arslanbey Campus, rapidly compensated for the university's losses. The university moved to Umuttepe Campus in 2004.

Kocaeli University's central Umuttepe Campus is located just outside Izmit in the region of Kocaeli, the most heavily industrialized region of Turkey. Most of its faculties are on this campus, except the Faculty of Fine Arts, the Faculty of Architecture & Design, the Faculty of Dentistry, and the Faculty of Animal Husbandry.

Istanbul is only 90 kilometres (56 mi) away, and its secondary international airport was developed on a site 50 kilometres (31 mi) from Izmit, making the university much more accessible in recent years. Since Kocaeli is a near neighbor of Istanbul, many of its students come from Istanbul.

The university has established a department of international relations that monitors Bologna developments closely and oversees KOU's participation in the Erasmus and Leonardo da Vinci student mobility schemes. With membership in the European University Association, KOU is aiming for greater international recognition of its academic work.

The university, while focusing on technical and engineering subjects, offers an extensive selection of courses in social sciences and arts as well.
