= Yıldız Technical University =

Public university in Istanbul, Turkey

Coordinates: 41.05149°N 29.01191°E

- Yıldız Teknik Üniversitesi
- Former names: Kondüktör Mekteb-i Âlisi (1911-1922); Nafia Fen Mektebi (1922-1937); İstanbul Teknik Okulu (1937-1969); İstanbul Devlet Mühendislik ve Mimarlık Akademisi (1969-1982); Yıldız Üniversitesi (1982-1992)
- Motto: Bilimi, üretimi ve girişimciliği destekleyen eğitim ekosistemi
- Motto in English: An educational ecosystem that supports science, innovation, and entrepreneurship
- Type: Public technical university
- Established: 1911; 115 years ago
- Affiliations: CAU; NAAB; Erasmus Programme; Pearson
- Rector: Eyüp Debik
- Academic staff: 1,675
- Students: 38,908
- Location: Istanbul, Turkey
- Campus: Yıldız • Davutpaşa • Maslak
- Colors: Navy Yellow
- Website: www.yildiz.edu.tr/en

Yıldız Technical University (Turkish: Yıldız Teknik Üniversitesi, often simply referred to as YTU or Yıldız) is a prominent public technical university dedicated to engineering and natural sciences, as well as social sciences recently, and is one of the oldest educational institutions in Istanbul, Turkey. The central campus lies within the Beşiktaş district and the new Davutpaşa campus lies within the Esenler district. Additionally, the university's research park is located in Başakşehir. The university is composed of ten faculties, three vocational schools, and two institutions.

== History ==
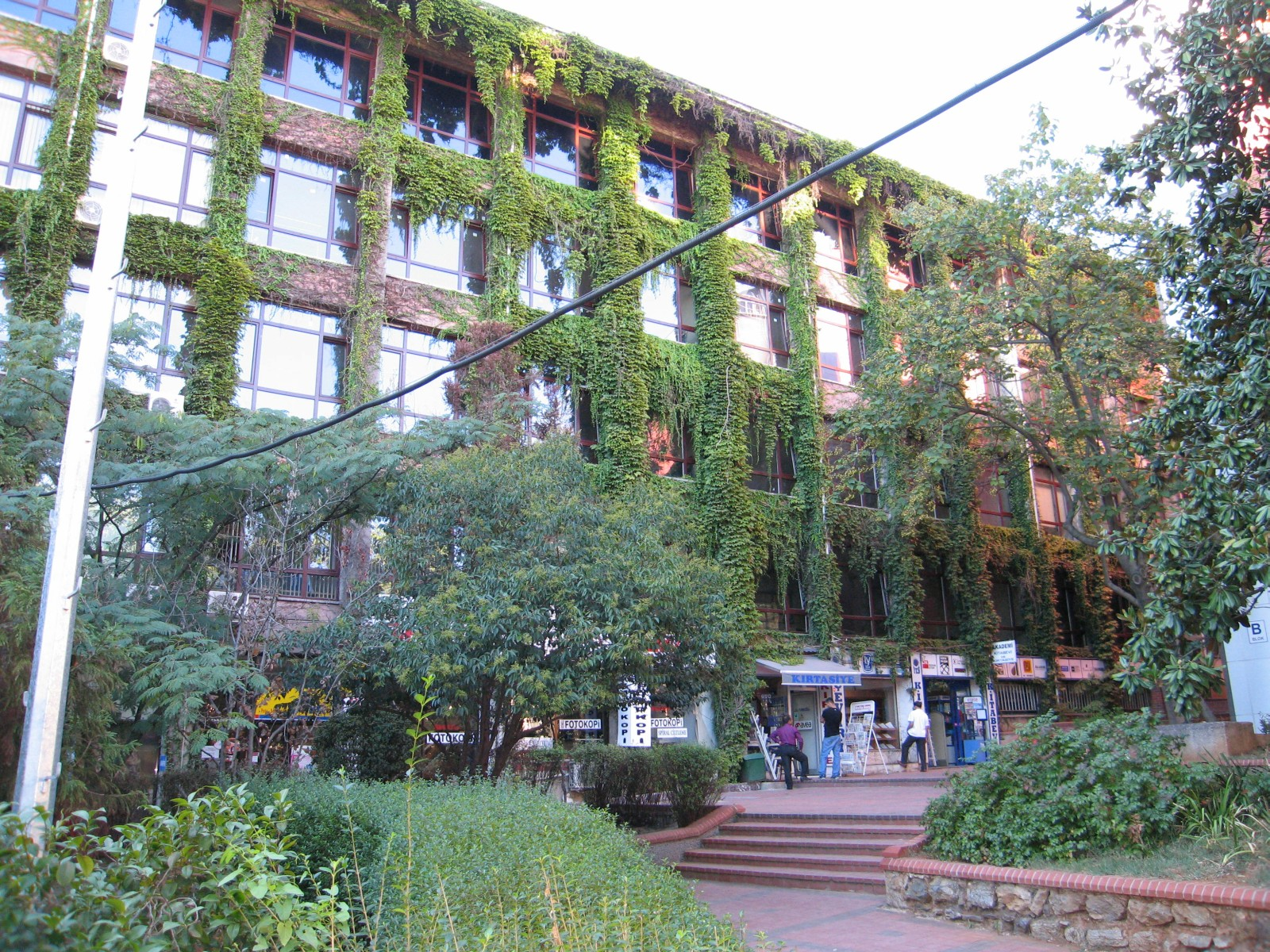
Yıldız Technical University Campus

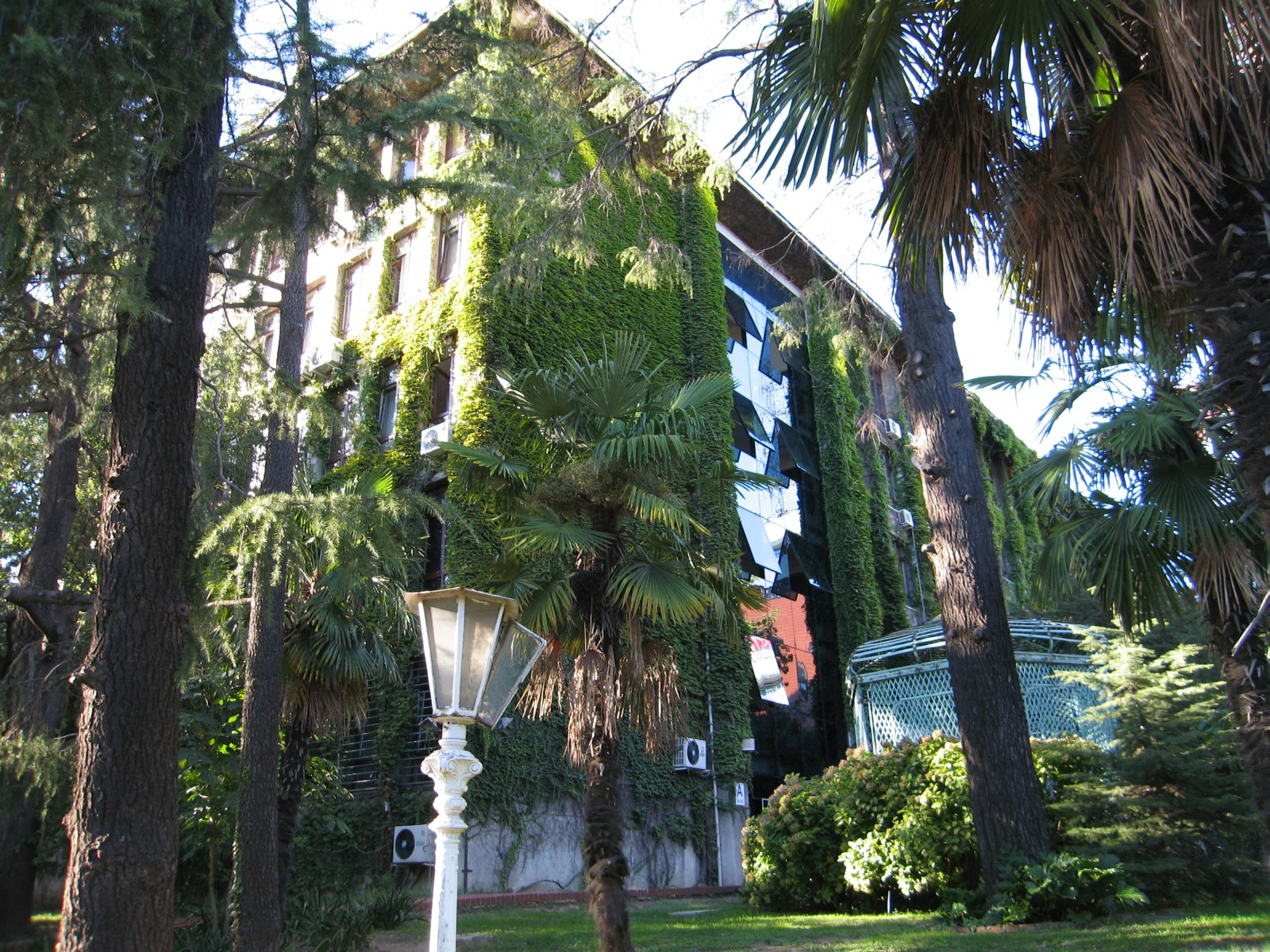
Yıldız Technical University, Block A

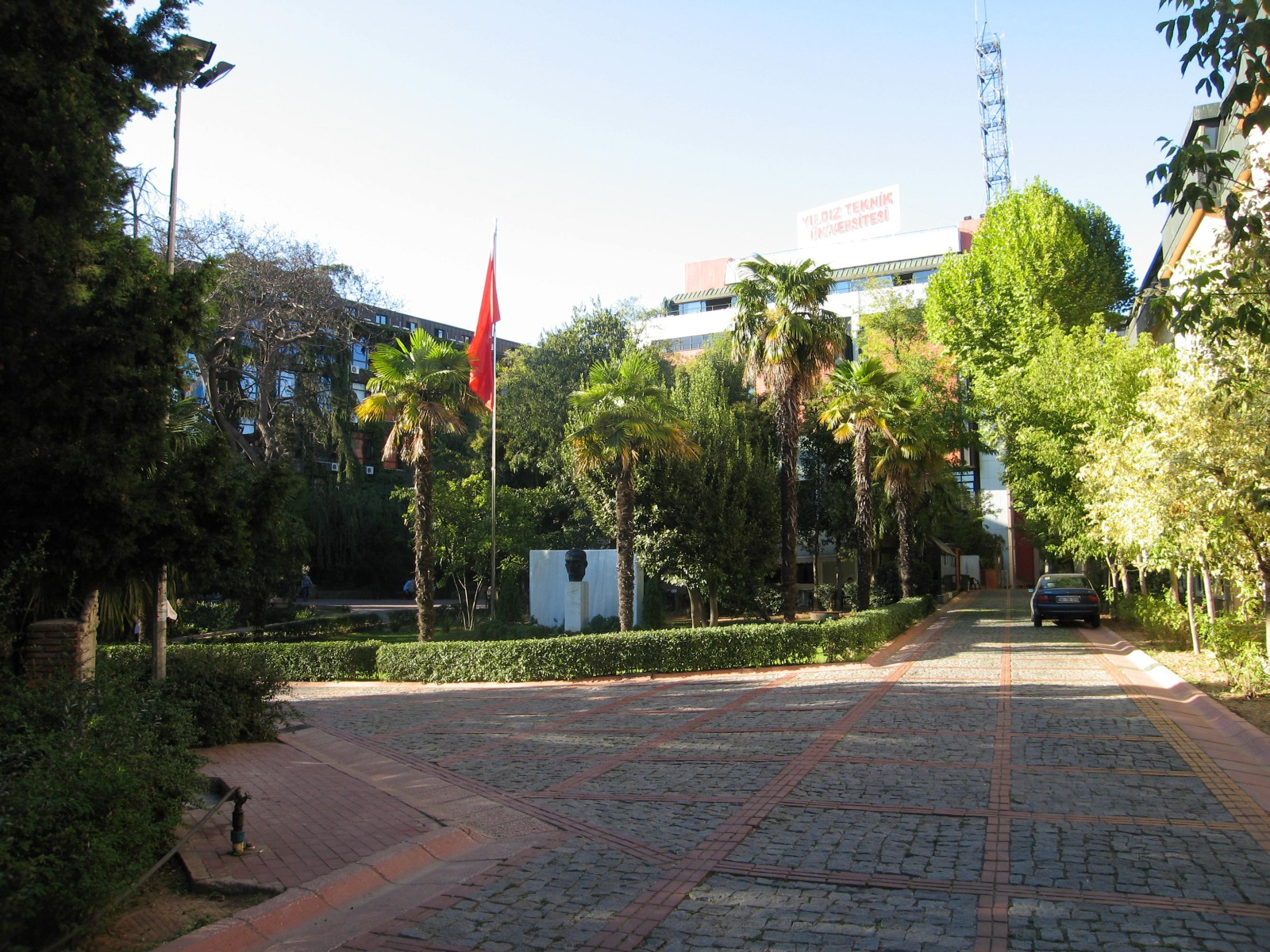
Yıldız Technical University Main Square

Yıldız Technical University has a distinguished history that dates to 1911. YTU was founded as Kondüktör Mekteb-i Âlisi (English: Conductors School of Higher Education) in order to meet the "science officer", known previously as conductors, and today as technicians, needs of the Municipality Public Works Section. The school was modeled on the syllabus of the Ecole de Conducteur and was affiliated with the Ministry of Public Works. The school's name was changed to Nafia Fen Mektebi (English: School of Public Works) in 1922. The duration of education was increased to two and a half years in 1926 and three years in 1931.

Following the increase in public facilities and the requirement for technical services, a ruling ordered the closure of Nafia Fen Mektebi and the establishment of a technical school to supply the workforce for the gap between technical officers and professional engineers. The school provided a two-year program for technical officers and a four-year program for engineers. Buildings were granted from the Yıldız Palace annexes, which are still in use today.

In the early period, the school consisted of civil and mechanical departments, educating students as technical officers and engineers. Starting with the 1942-1943 semester, electrical and architecture departments were added as part of the Department of Engineering. The school was established as an autonomous higher education and research institution in 1969. With a law which ruled for the closing of special vocational schools in 1971, engineering schools were affiliated with the Istanbul State Engineering and Architectural Academy.

=== Campuses history ===
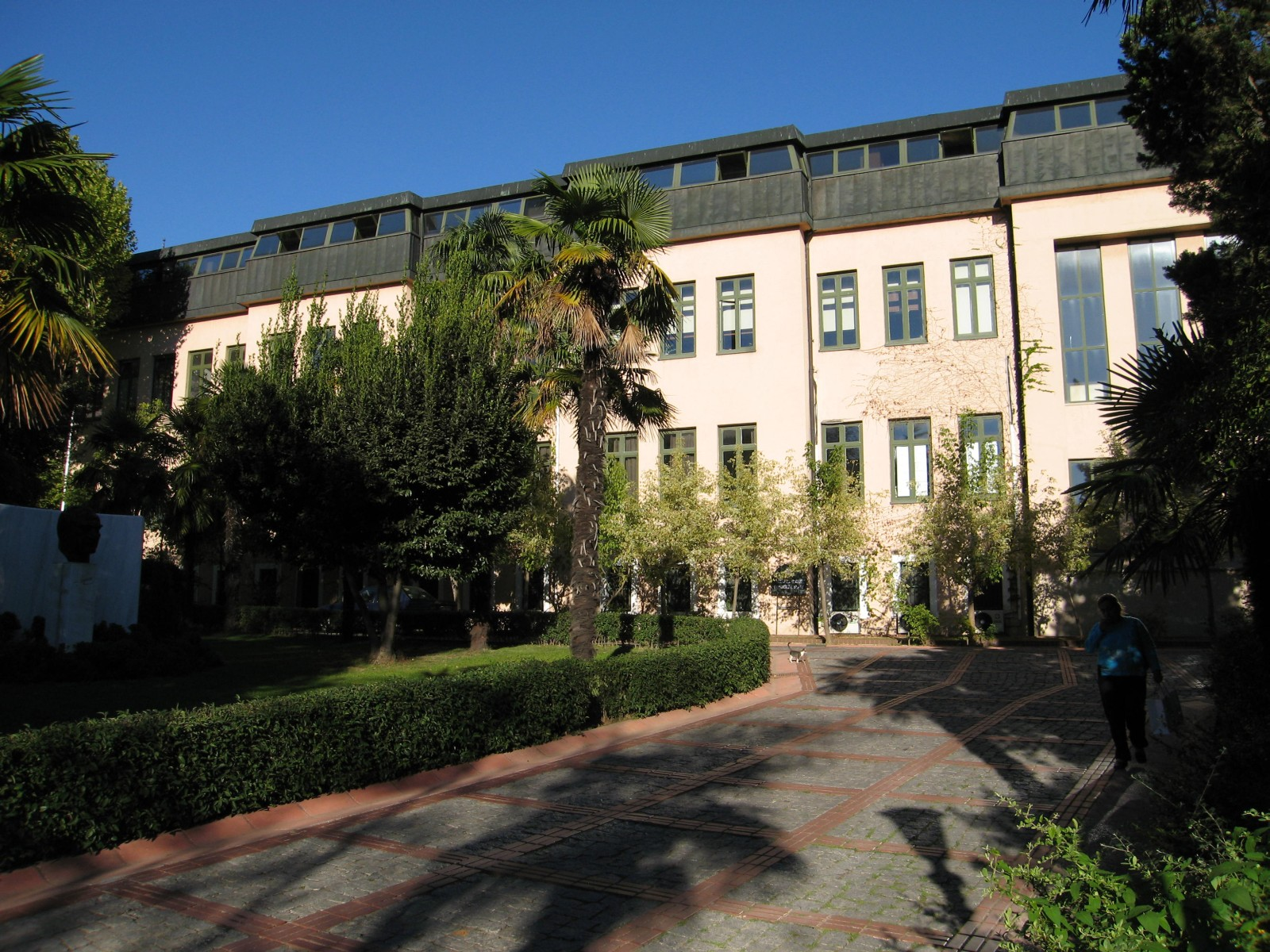
Yıldız Technical University in Istanbul, Faculty of Architecture

Yıldız University was formed by the merger of the Istanbul State Engineering and Architectural Academy along with affiliated schools of engineering, and related faculties and departments of the Kocaeli State Engineering and Architecture Academy together with the Kocaeli Vocational School. The new university incorporated a Science Institute, a Social Sciences Institute, and the departments of Science-Literature and Engineering, Foreign Languages, Turkish Language, Atatürk Principles & the History of Revolution, Physical Education and Fine Arts.

The university took its final name in 1992 as Yıldız Technical University. The Faculty of Engineering was divided into four faculties and restructured as: Faculty of Electrical-Electronics, Faculty of Construction, Faculty of Mechanical and Chemical-Metallurgy, and Faculty of Economics and Administrative Sciences. The Kocaeli Faculty of Engineering and the Kocaeli Vocational School were separated from the university to be restructured as Kocaeli University.

== Faculties ==
- Faculty of Electric and Electronics
- Faculty of Literature and National Culture Studies
- Faculty of Arts & Sciences
- Faculty of Art and Design
- Faculty of Education
- Faculty of Economic and Administrative Sciences
- Faculty of Civil Engineering
- Faculty of Chemical and Metallurgical Engineering
- Faculty of Mechanical Engineering
- Faculty of Naval Architecture and Maritime
- Faculty of Architecture
- Faculty of Applied Sciences

=== Institutes and schools ===
- Institute of Science and Engineering
- Institute of Social Sciences
- School of Vocational Studies
- School of Foreign Languages

== Affiliations ==
The university is a member of the Caucasus University Association.

== Rankings ==
University rankings

Global – Overall
- ARWU World: 901-1000
- CWTS World: 762
- QS World: 731-740 (2026)
- RUR World: 660
- THE World: 801-1000
- USNWR Global: 769

Global – Science and engineering
- QS Engineering & Tech.: 357 (2023)

Regional – Overall
- QS Emerging Europe and Central Asia: 101 (2022)

In 2018, Times Higher Education ranked the university top 1000 in the world.

In the QS World University Rankings 2023, YTU is ranked at 251-300th in the subject areas "Electrical & Electronics Engineering" and "Mechanical, Aeronautical & Manufacturing Engineering". Moreover, in the broad subject area of "Engineering & Technology", YTU stands at 357th place worldwide.

In the Academic Ranking of World Universities 2019, YTU is ranked at 201-300th in the subject area "Civil Engineering", 301-400th in the subject area "Mechanical Engineering", and 401-500th in the subject areas "Physics" and "Chemical Engineering".

The Best Global Universities Ranking of the U.S. News & World Report ranks YTU 769th in the world and 292nd in the subject area "Engineering" as of 2019.

By CWTS Leiden Ranking 2019, YTU is ranked 762nd (overall), 450th in the subject area "Physical Sciences and Engineering" and 422nd in the subject area "Mathematics and Computer Science".

By URAP 2018, Yıldız Technical University is ranked 868th (overall) and 461st in the subject area "Engineering".

By Round University Ranking 2019, YTU is ranked 660st in the world, 529th in the "Technical Sciences" and 598th in the "Natural Sciences".

== Notable people ==
See also Yıldız Technical University alumni for the detailed list.

- Oktay Sinanoğlu, Turkish physical chemist and molecular biophysicist
- Şirin Pancaroğlu, Turkish harpist
- Ayşegül Abadan, Turkish pianist
- Tarık Akan, Turkish film actor and producer
- Ali Coşkun, Minister of Industry and Trade of Turkey
- Hasan Doğan, 37th president of the Turkish Football Federation
- Fuat Güner, Turkish pop musician, member of the renowned band MFÖ
- Kenan İmirzalıoğlu, Turkish actor and former model
- Fikret Orman, 33rd President of Beşiktaş JK
- Kazim Öz, Kurdish film director, scriptwriter and producer
- Yiğit Özşener, Turkish actor
- İlhan Şen, Turkish actor and former model
- Ahu Türkpençe, Turkish actress
- Murat Yildirim, Turkish actor
- Alp Navruz, Turkish actor and model
- Ceylan Ertem, Turkish singer and songwriter
- Nejat İşler, Turkish actor
- Ertuğrul Sağlam, UEFA-licensed Turkish football manager

== Gallery ==
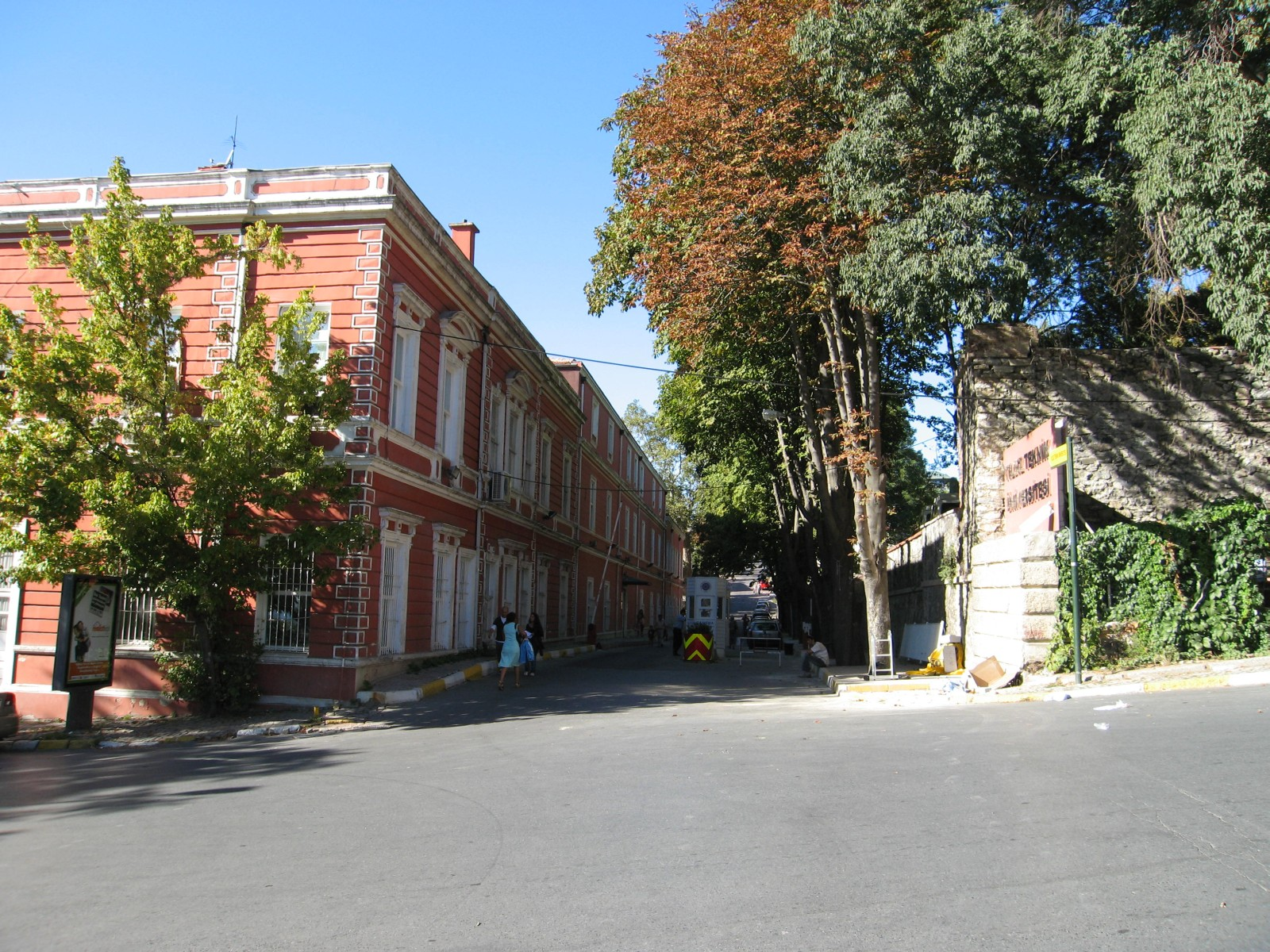
Entrance of the University

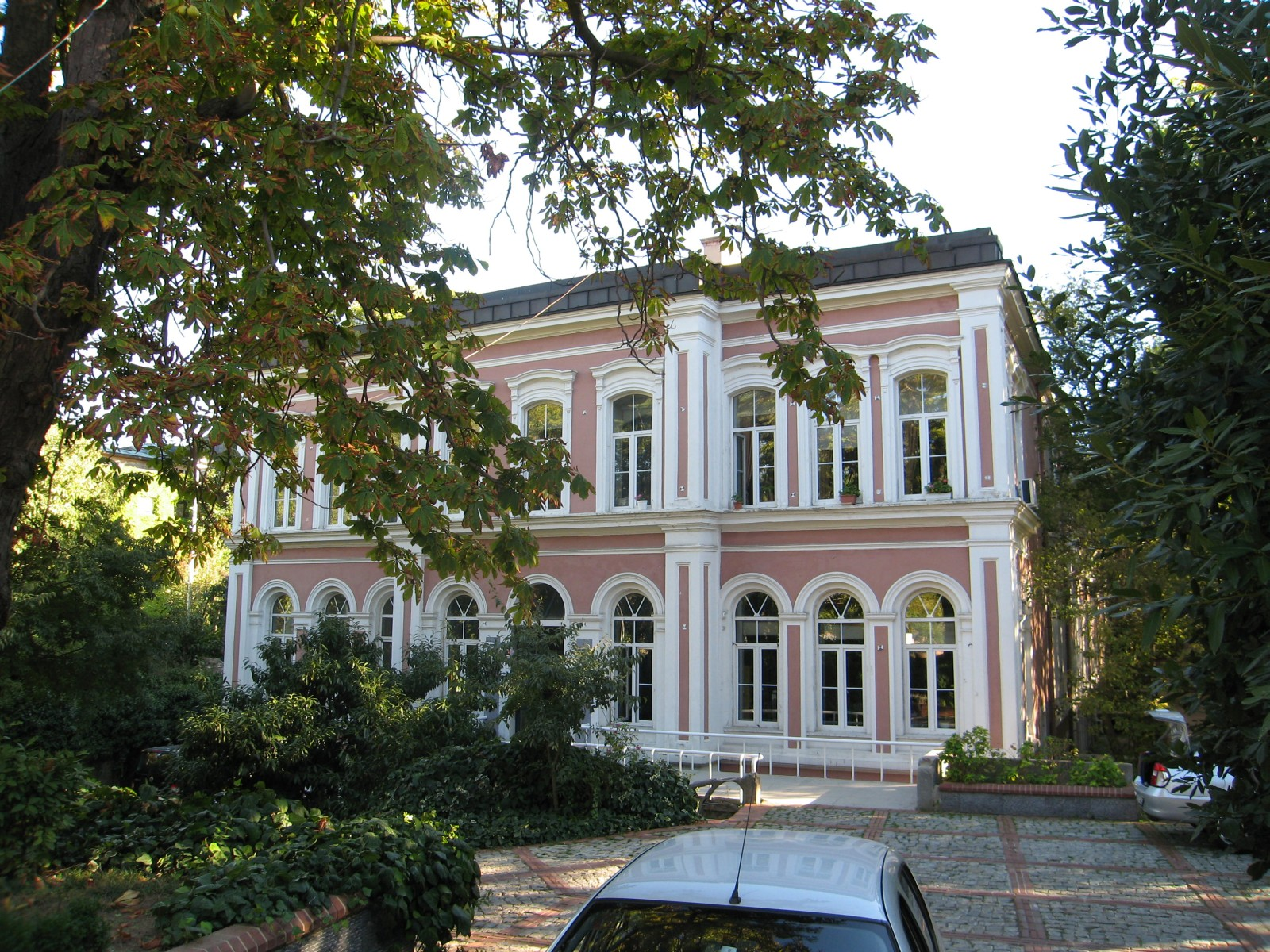
Çukursaray Building

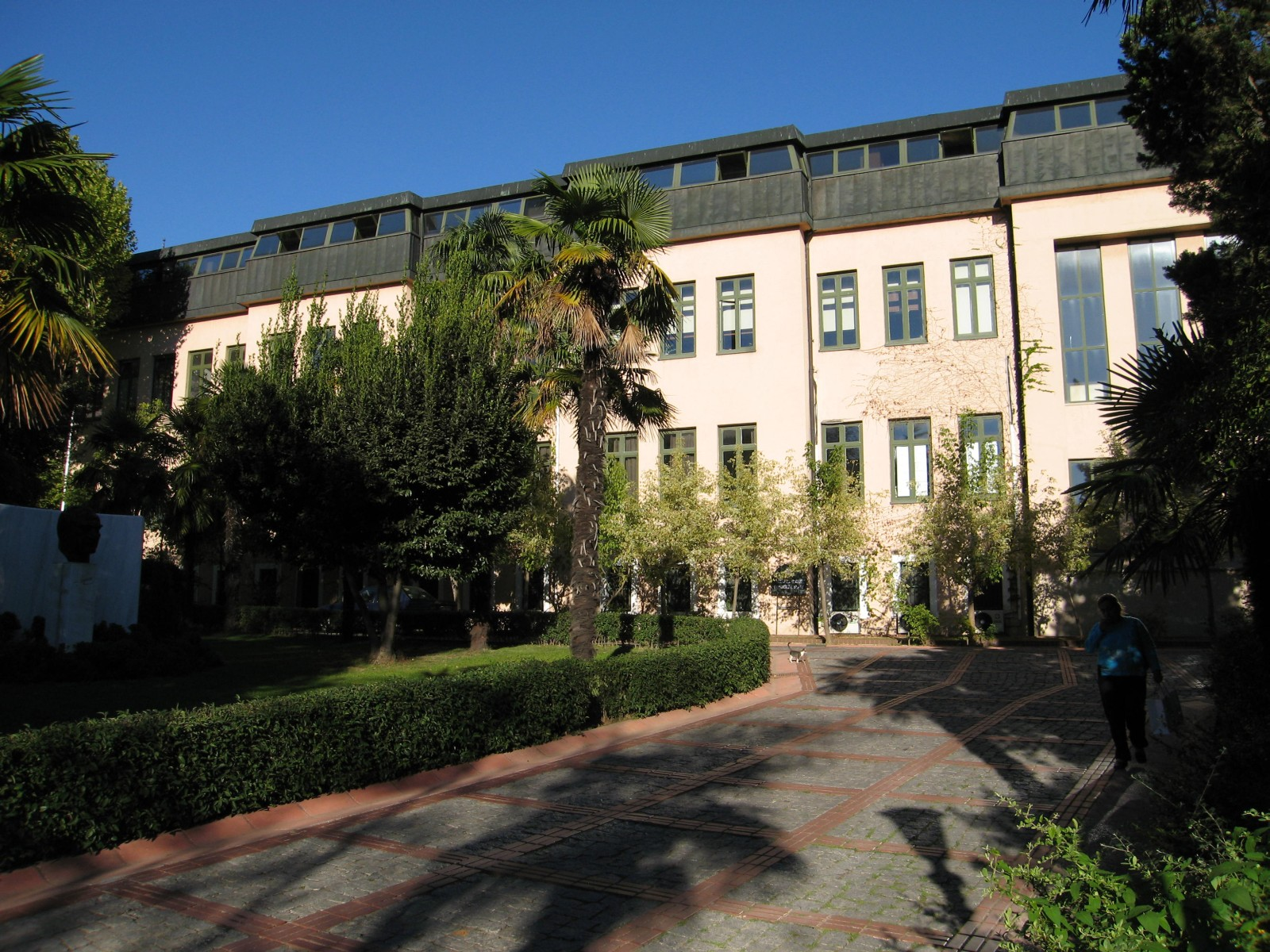
Faculty of Architecture

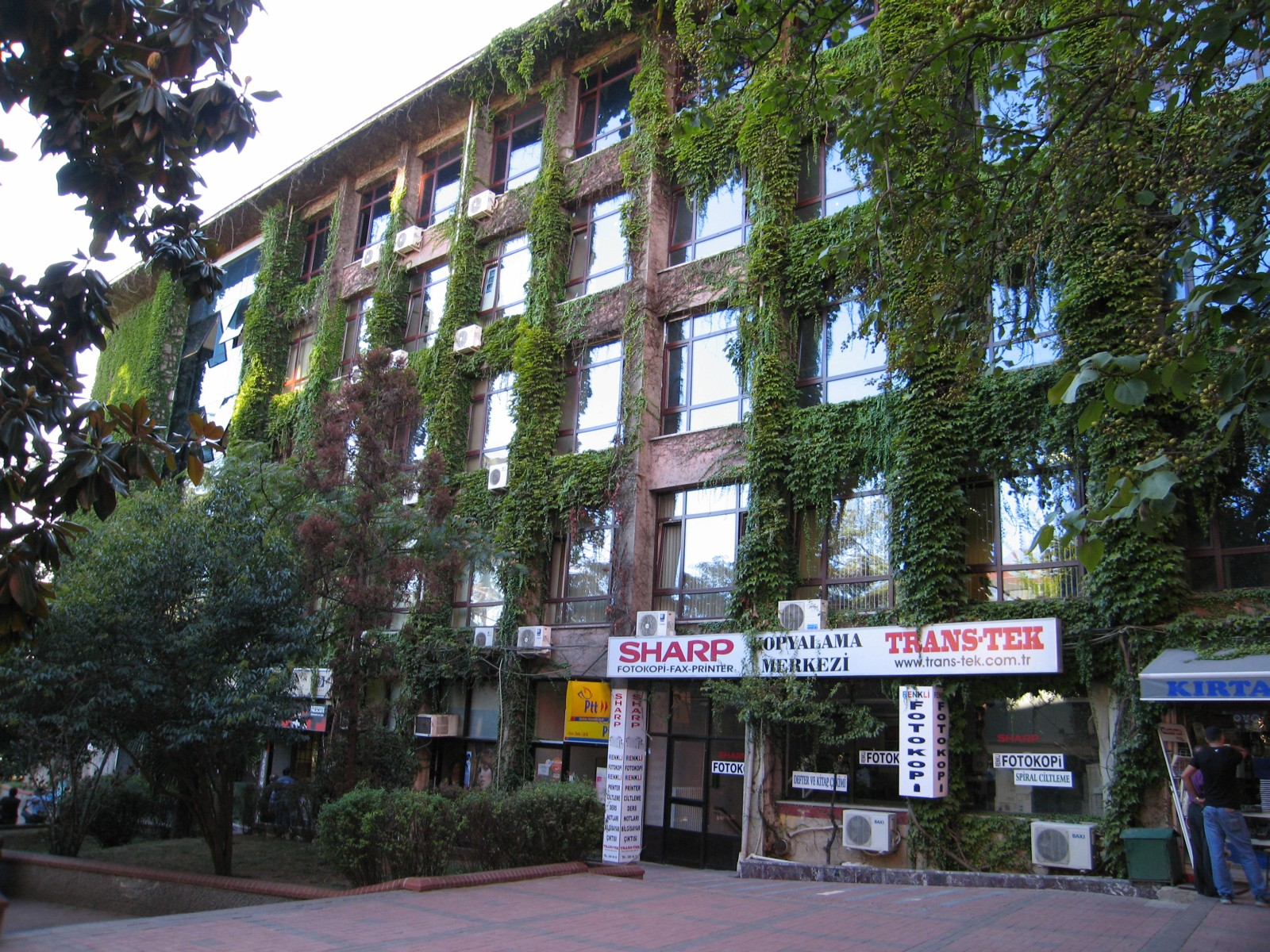
YTU Main building, Block A

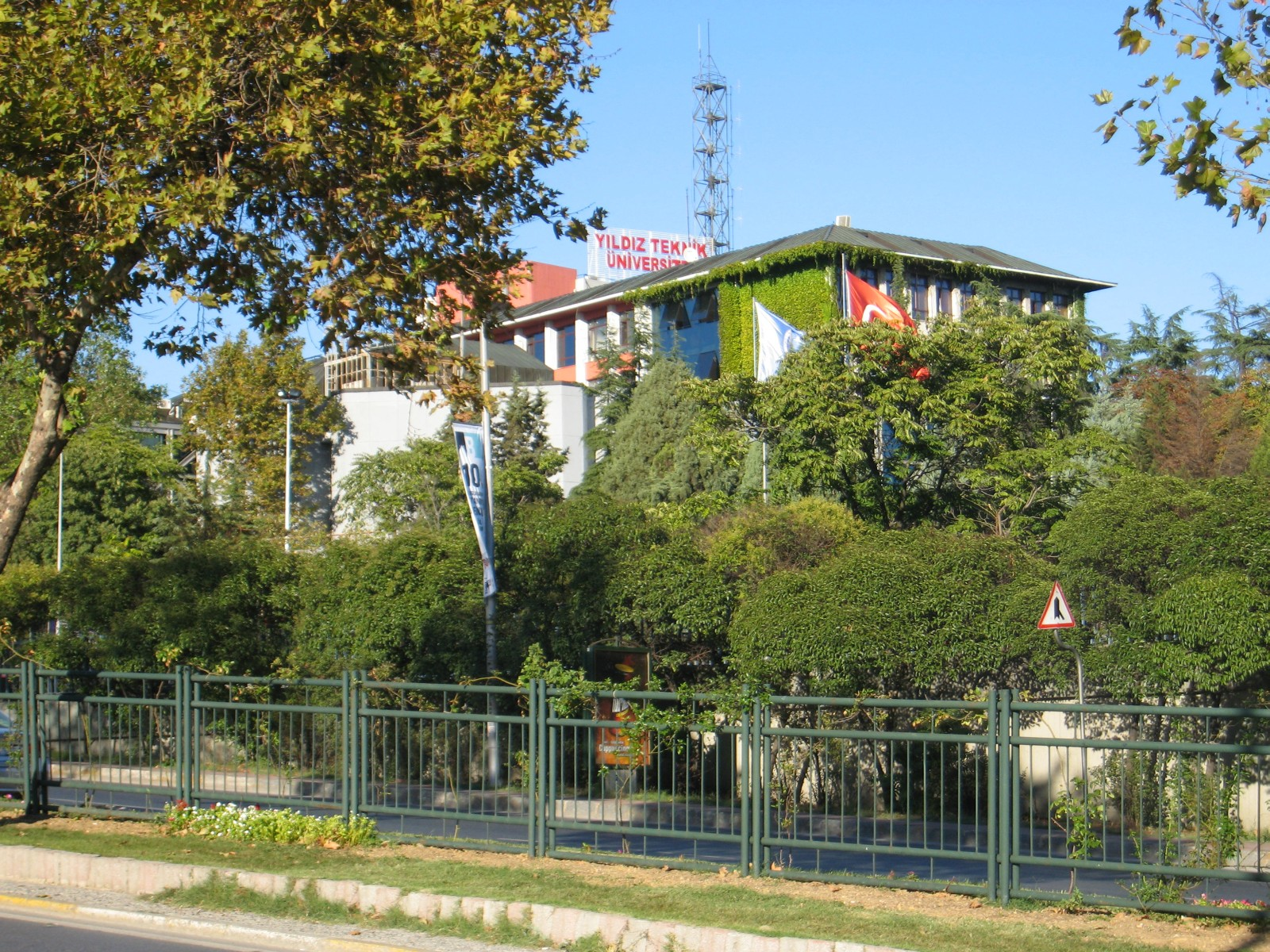
YTU Main Building

Beşiktaş Campus

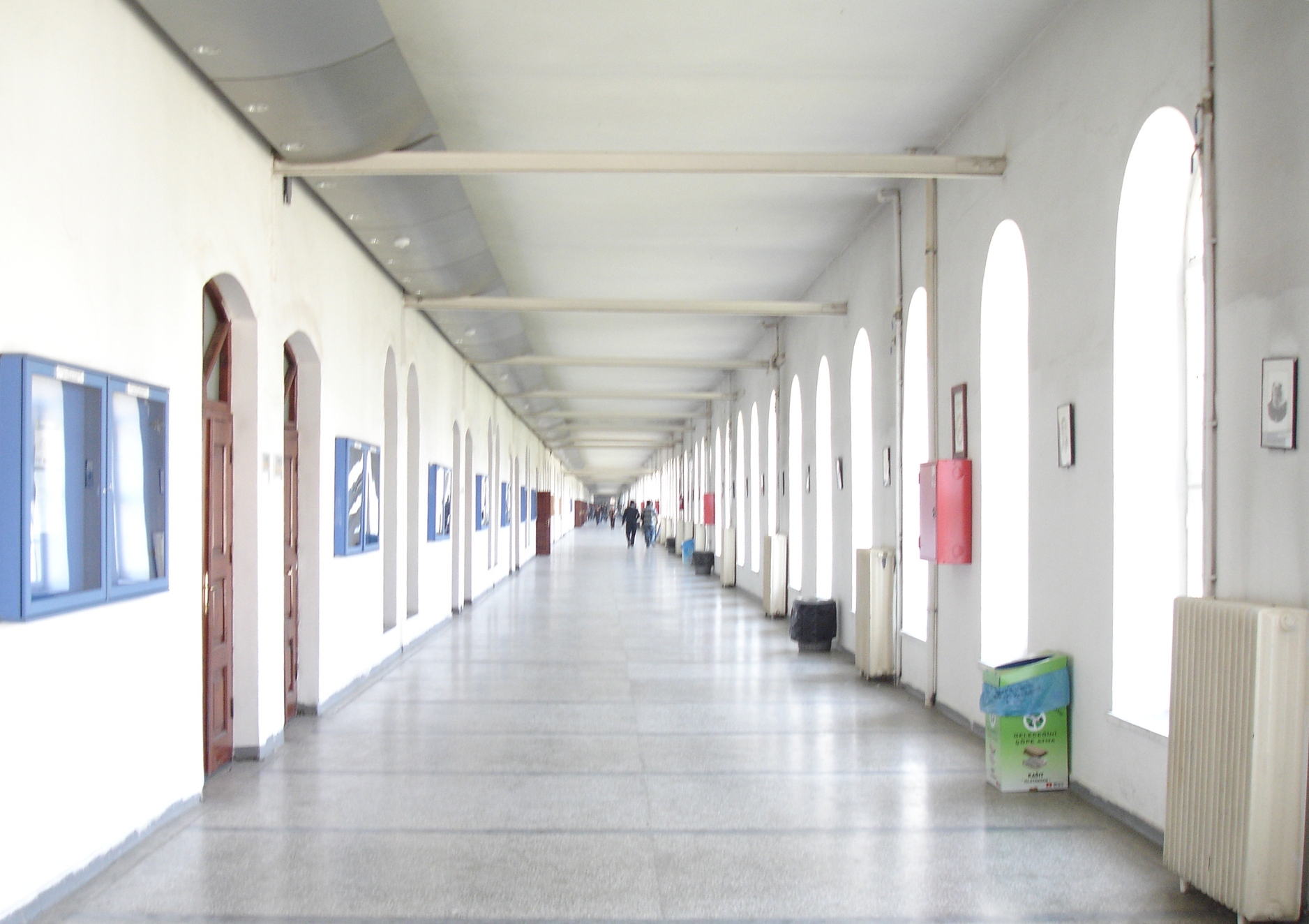
Davutpaşa Campus

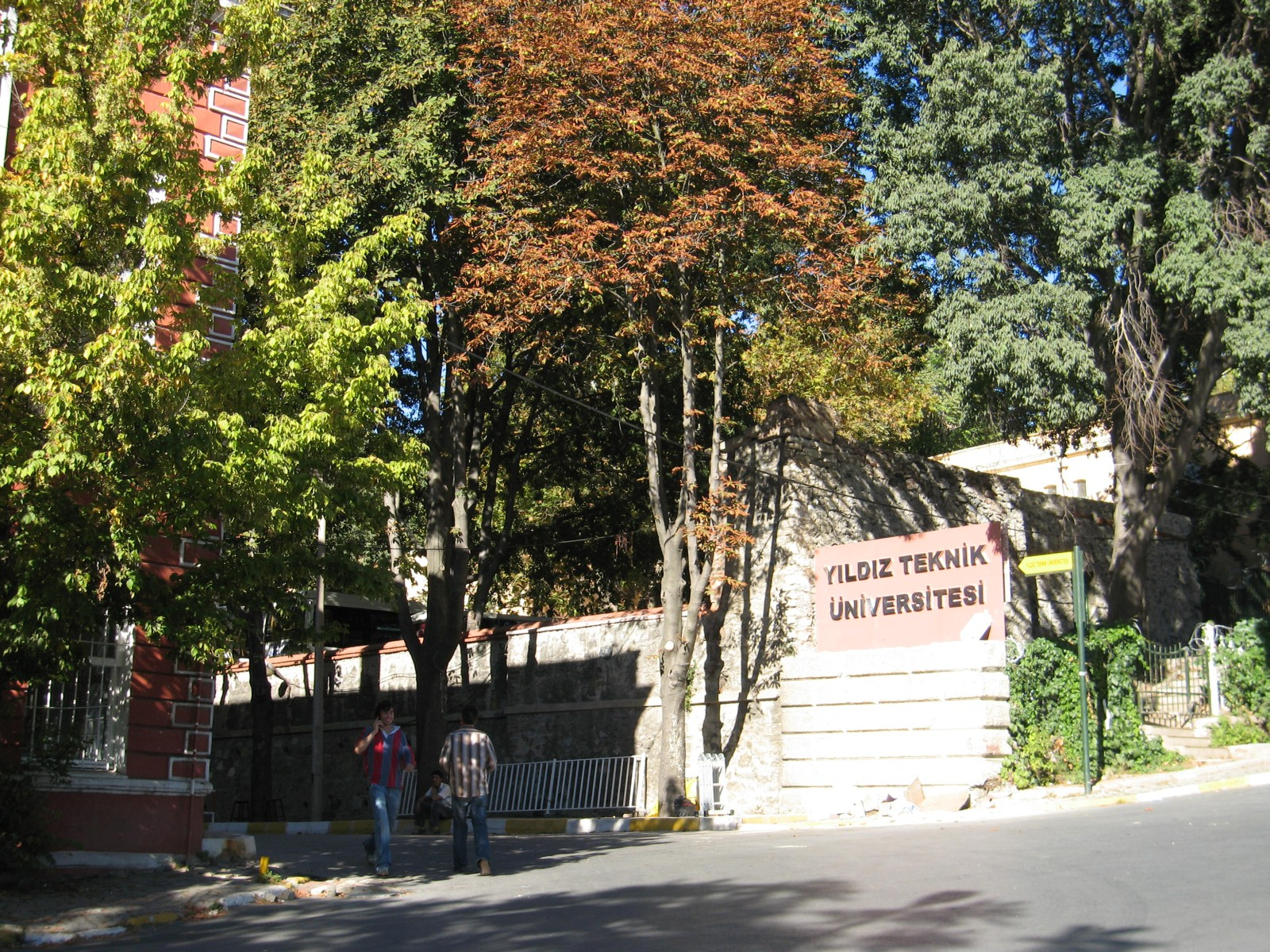
Beşiktaş Campus

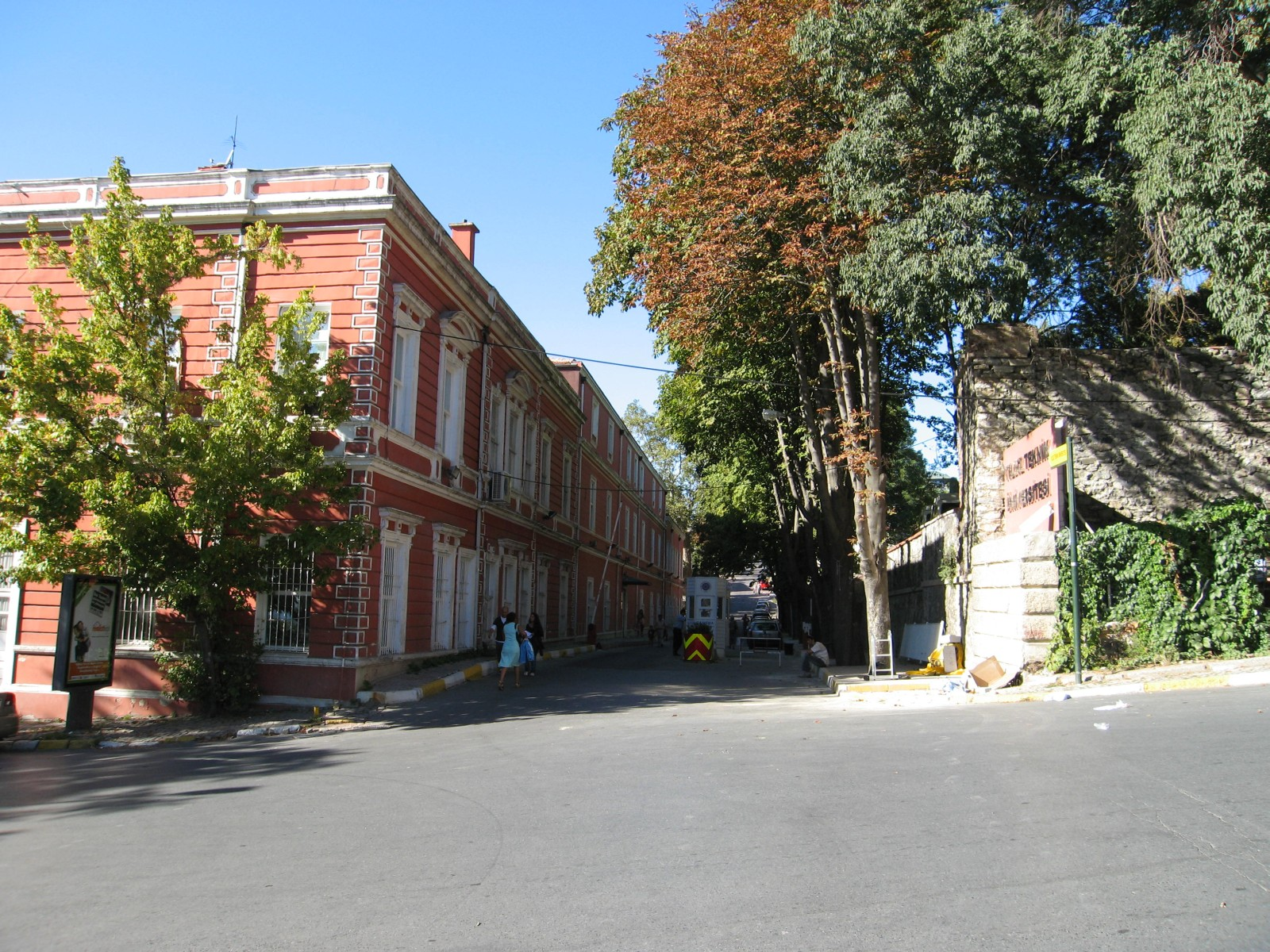
Beşiktaş Campus

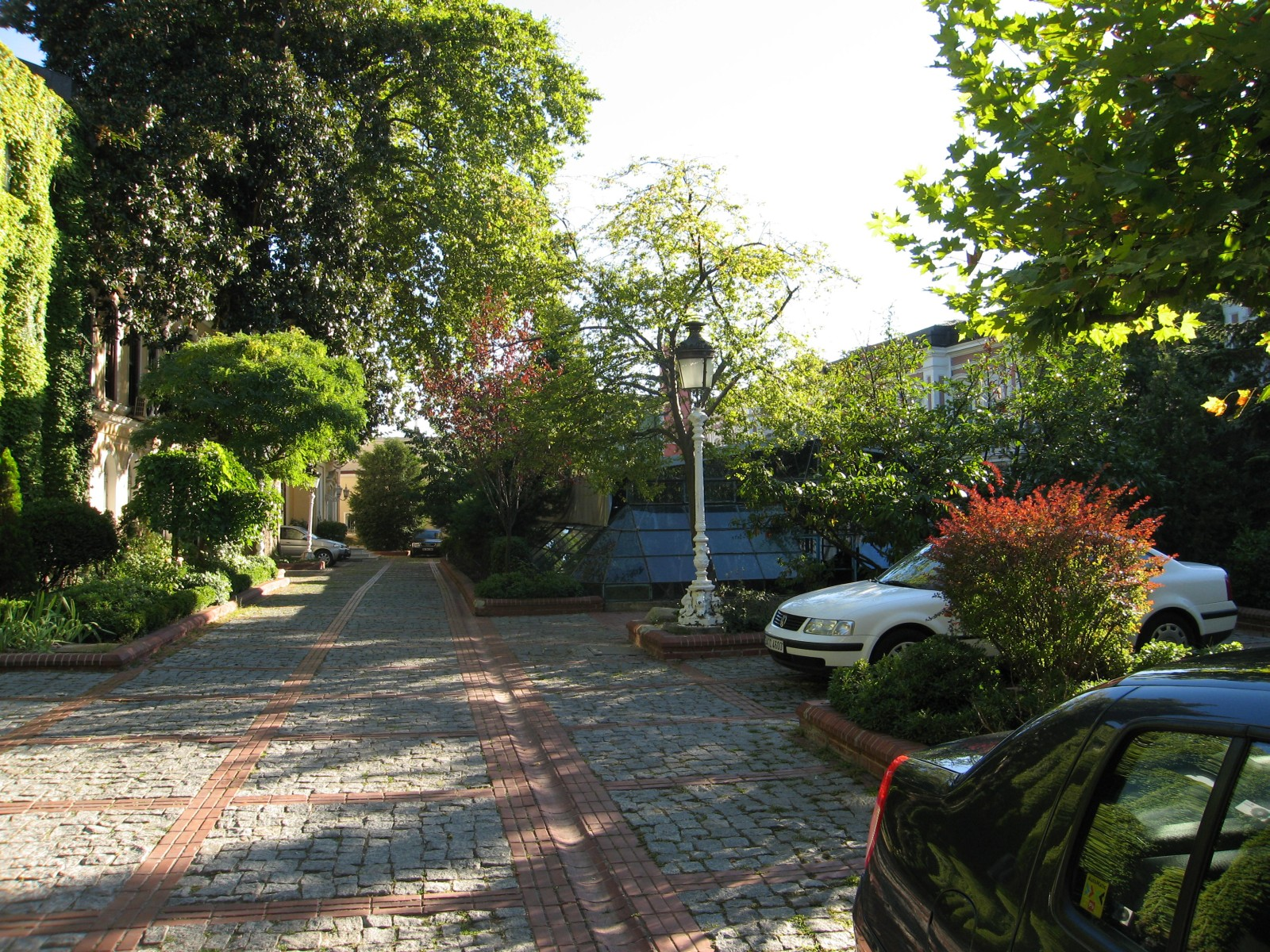
Beşiktaş Campus

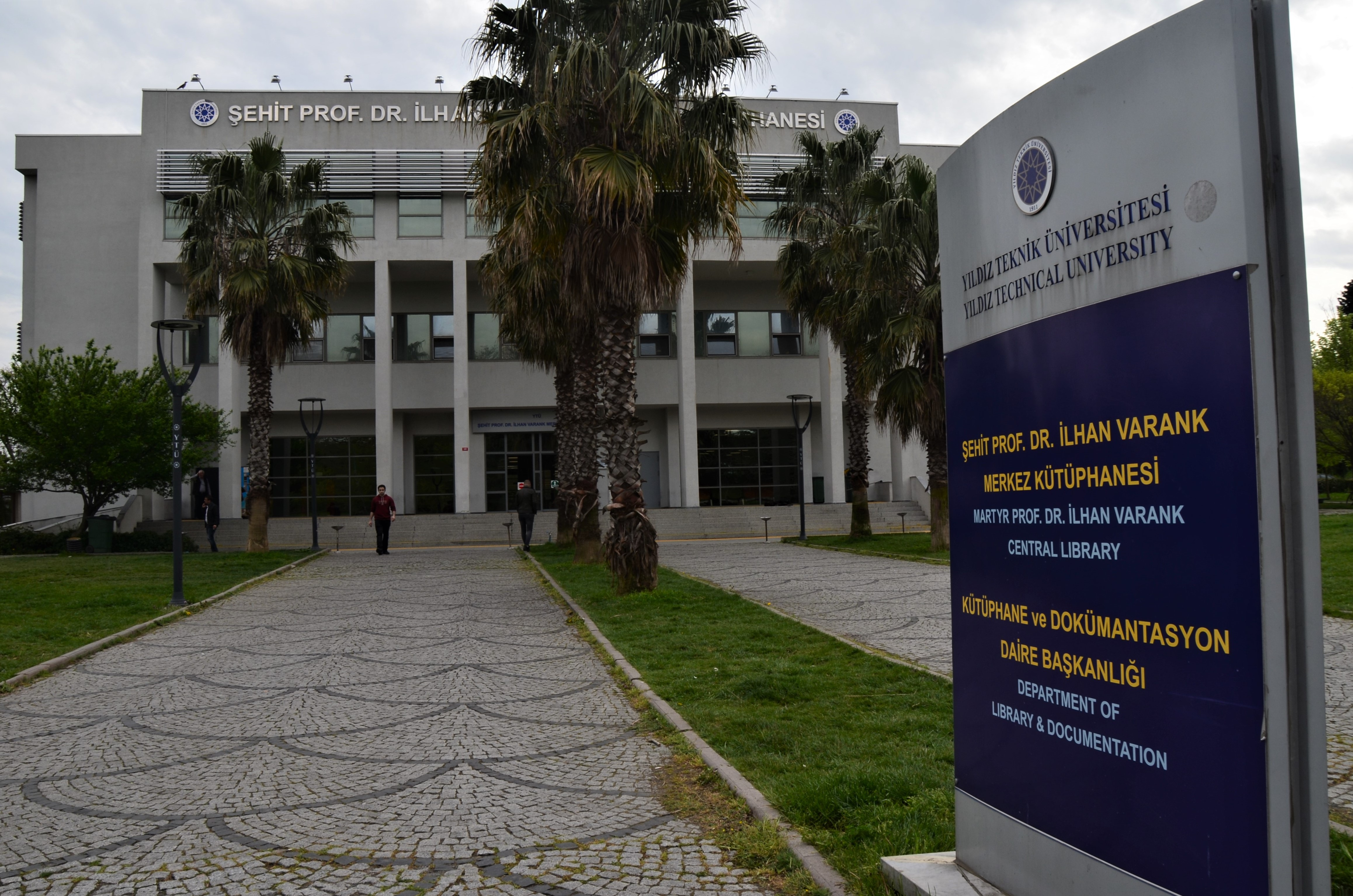
Central Library

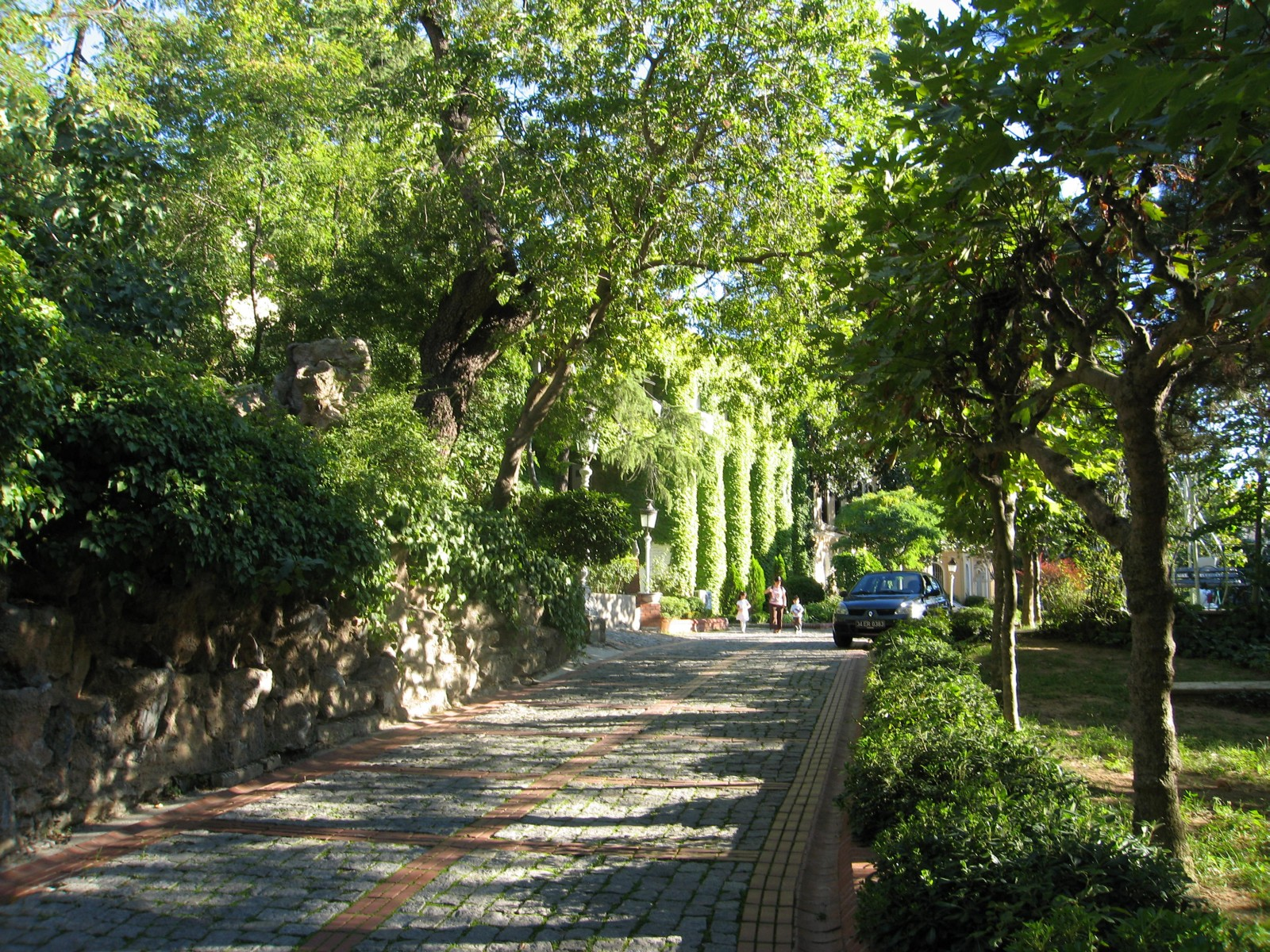
Beşiktaş Campus

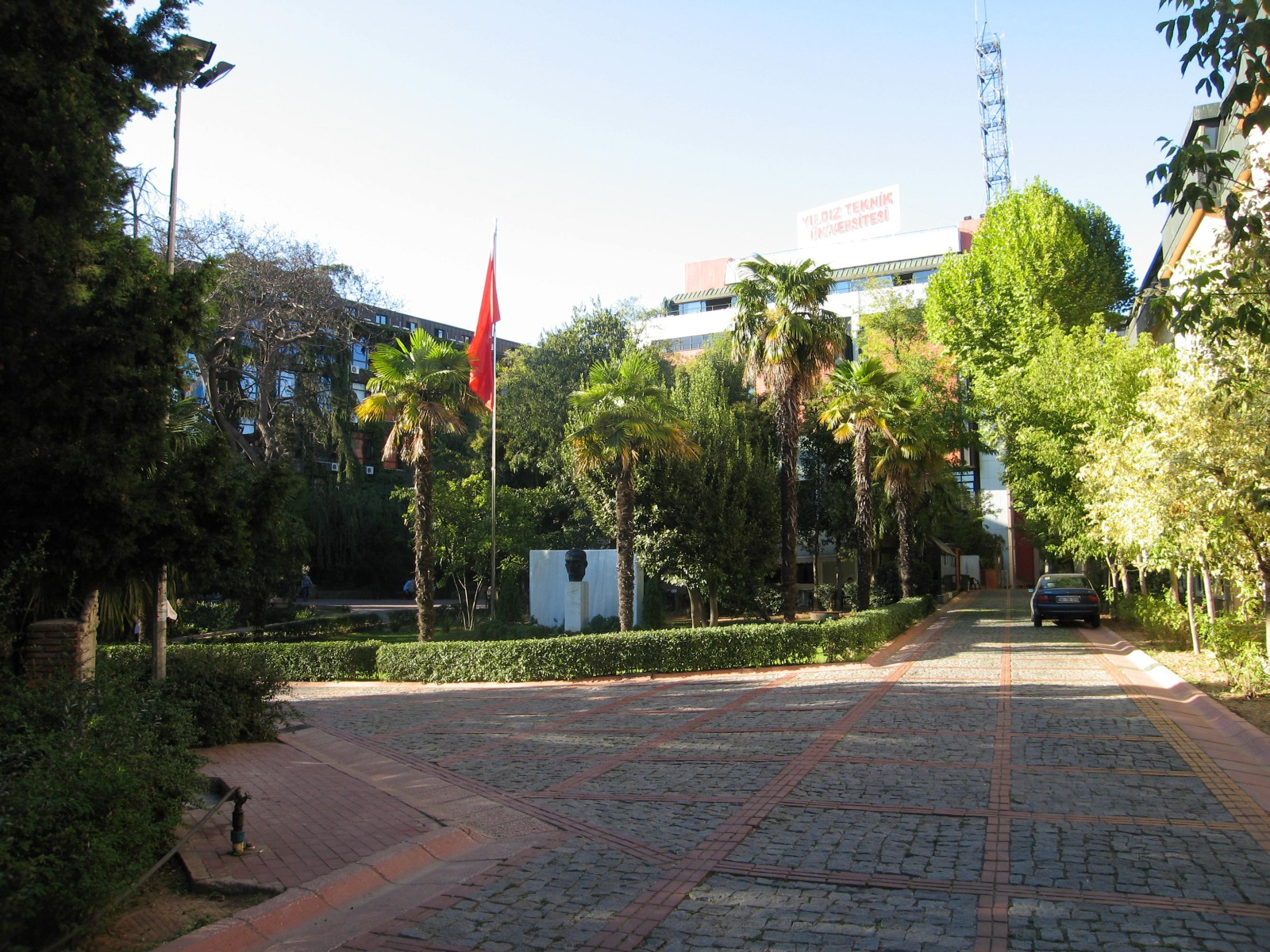
Beşiktaş Campus

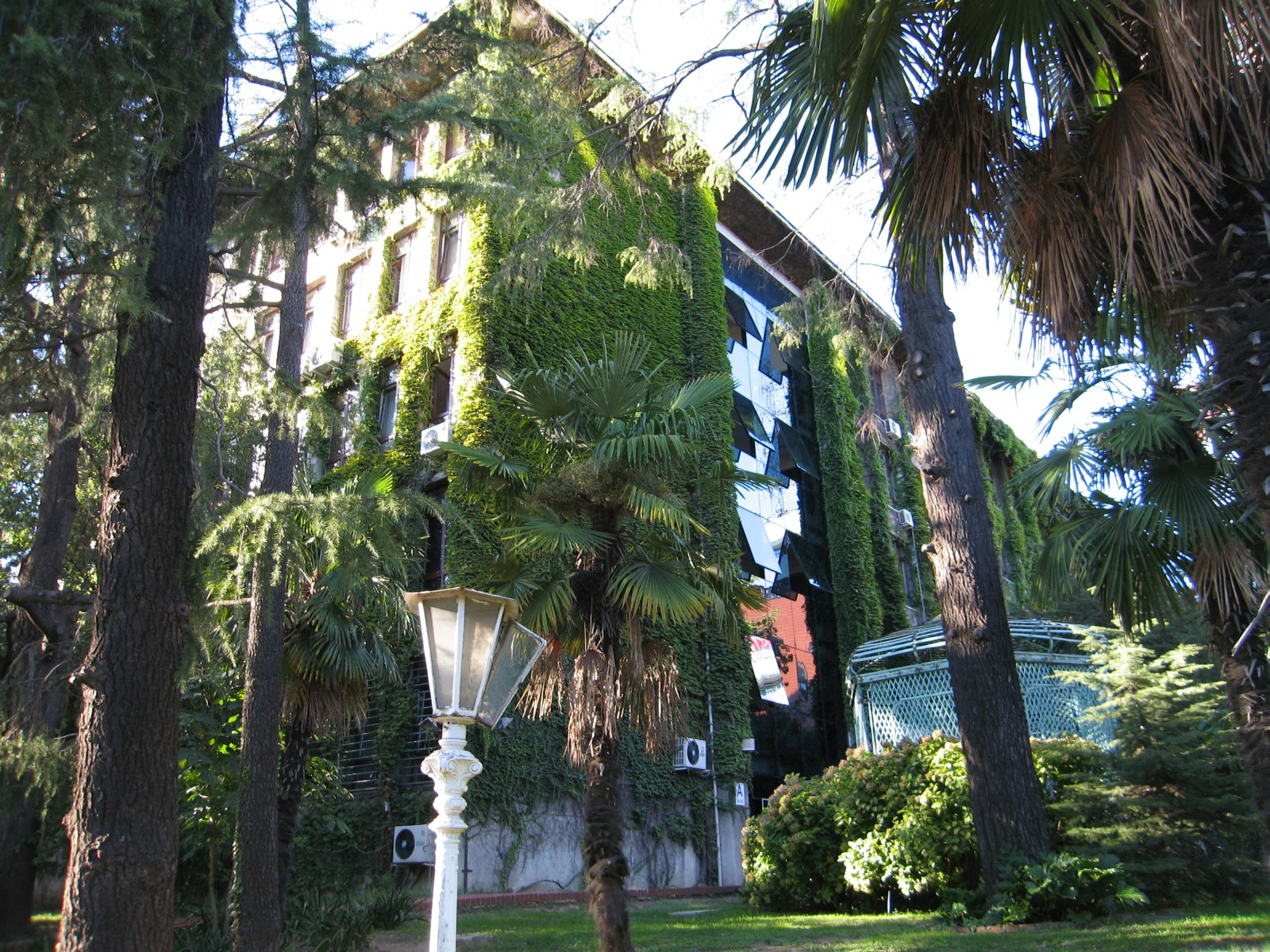
Beşiktaş Campus

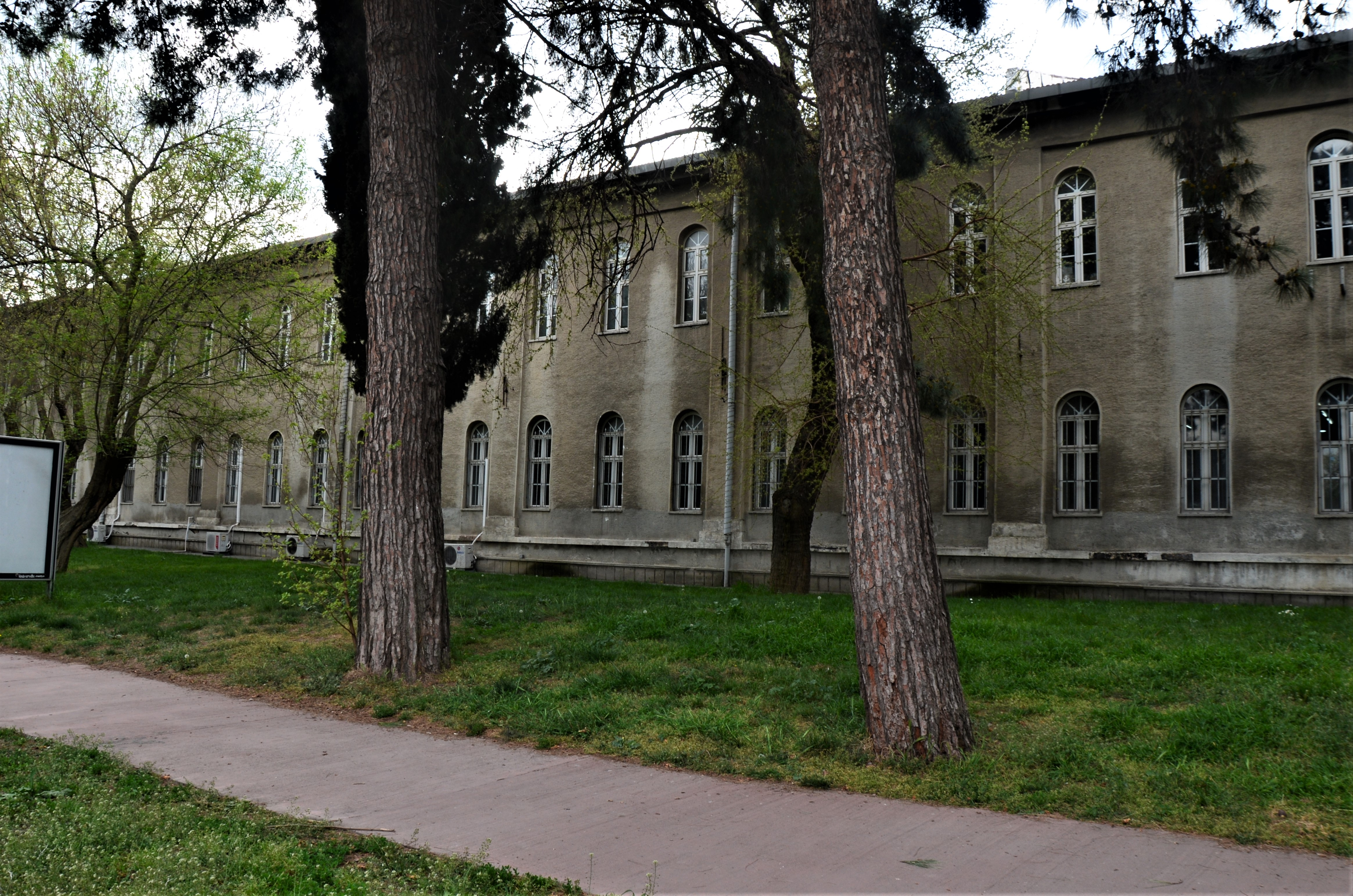
Davutpaşa Campus

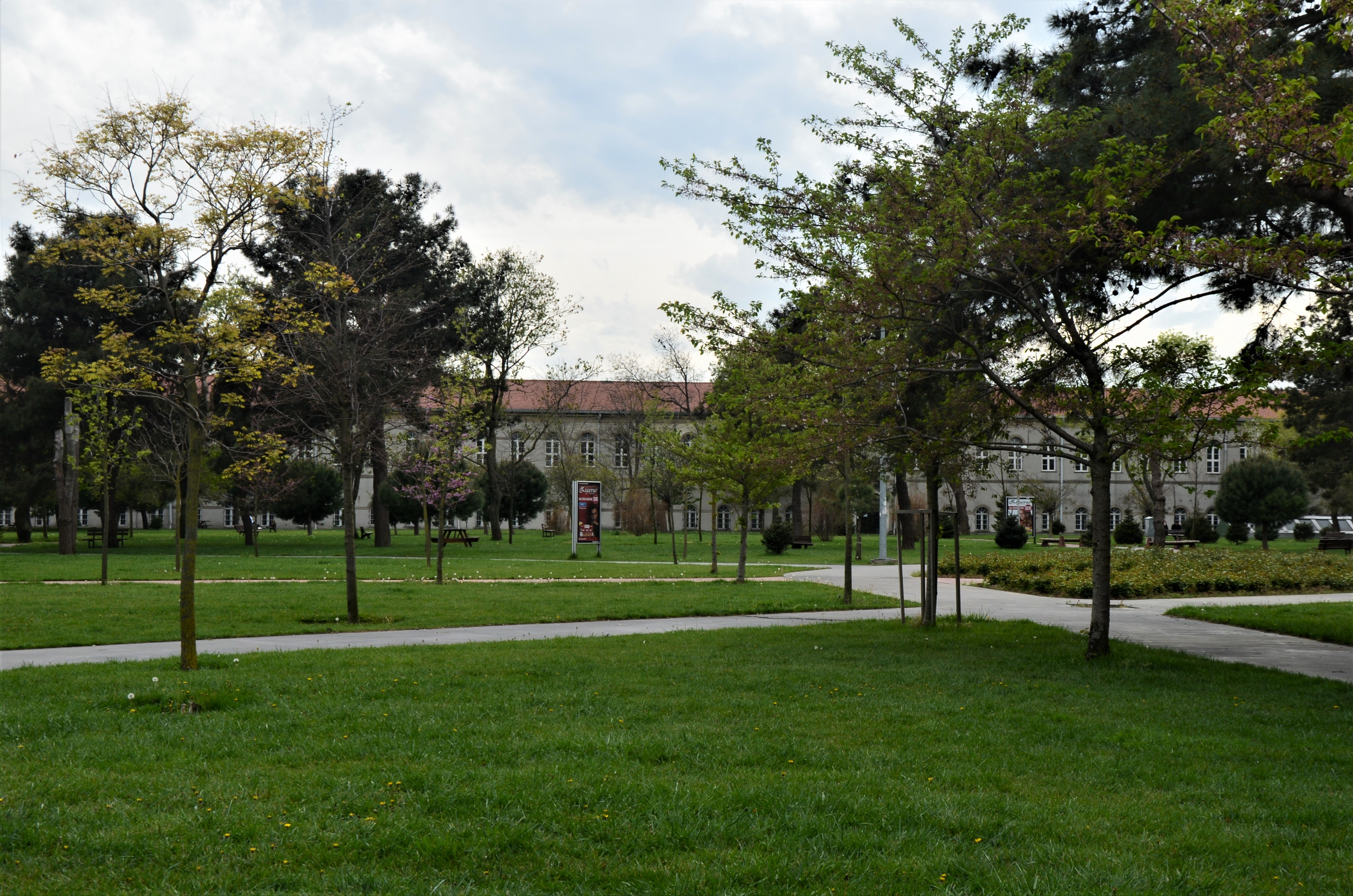
Davutpaşa Campus

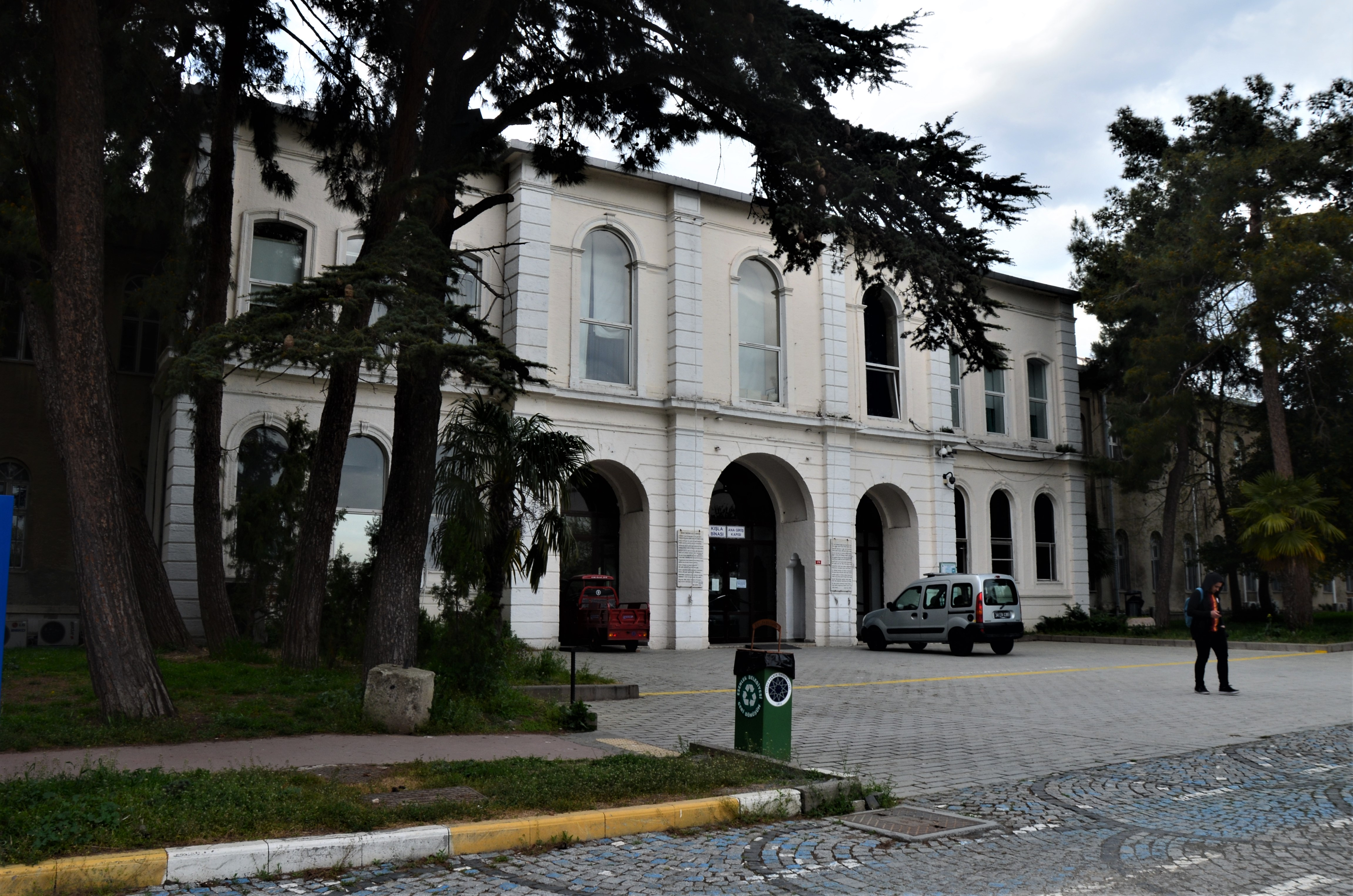
Davutpaşa Campus

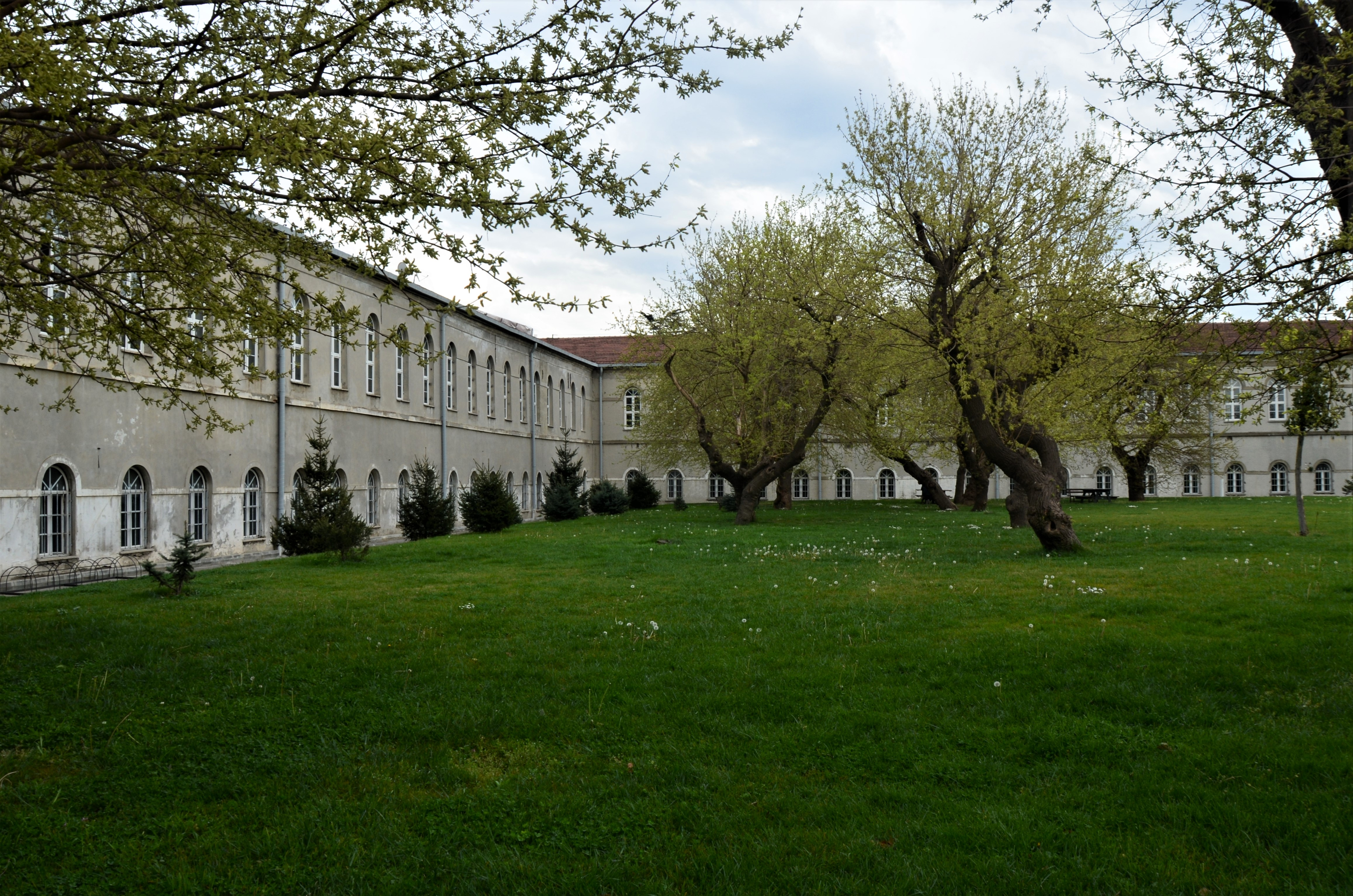
Davutpaşa Campus

== See also ==
- Istanbul Technical University
- Technical university
- Turkish universities
