= Terwispel =

- Village
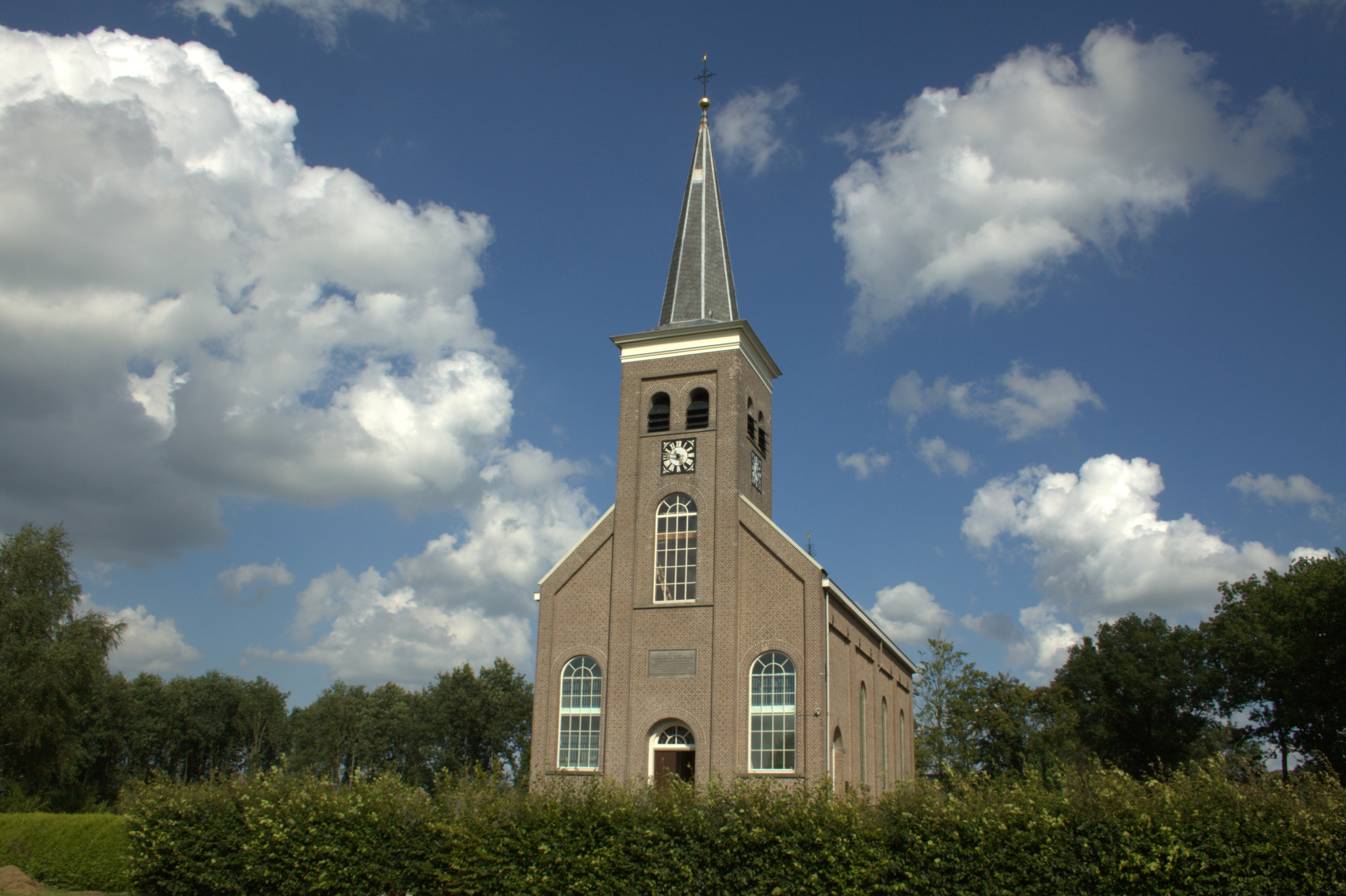
- Terwispel church

- Coat of arms

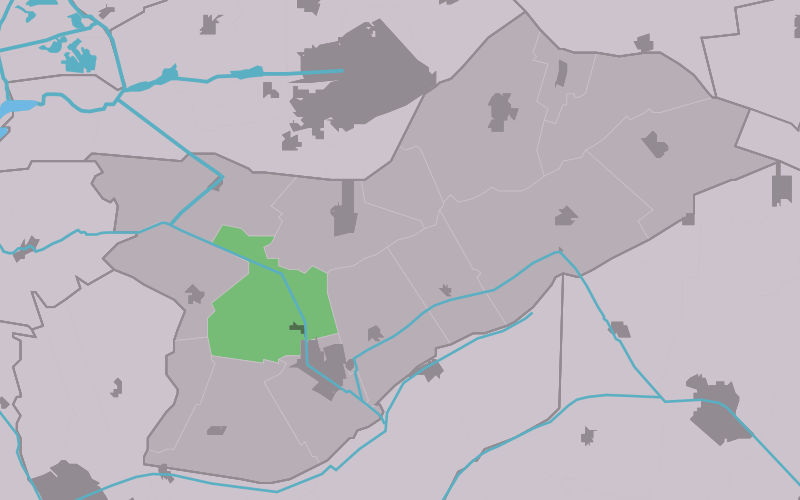
- Location in Opsterland municipality

- Location in the Netherlands Terwispel (Netherlands)
- Country: Netherlands
- Province: Friesland
- Municipality: Opsterland

Area
  - Total: 16.55 km^{2} (6.39 sq mi)
- Elevation: −0.7 m (−2.3 ft)

Population (2021)
  - Total: 1,000
  - Density: 60/km^{2} (160/sq mi)
- Time zone: UTC+1 (CET)
  - Summer (DST): UTC+2 (CEST)
- Postal code: 8407
- Dialing code: 0513
- Website: Official

Terwispel is a village in the municipality of Opsterland in the east of Friesland, the Netherlands. Its neighbouring villages are Tijnje (west), Nij Beets (north-west), Beetsterzwaag (north), Lippenhuizen (south-east), Gorredijk (South), Langezwaag (south-west) and Luxwoude (also south-west). It had a population of around 1,020 in January 2017.

== History ==
In the 11th century Terwispel was founded as a colony for peat digging in the woods of South-east Fryslân. This was essential to the economy of most of The Netherlands as dried peat called turf was the most common fuel. However, as the diggers turned further east into Drenthe, Terwispel lost her prosperity. At that time Terwispel was much larger than it is nowadays, for also present day neighbouring village Tijnje was part of the Terwispel community.

At the beginning of the 20th century, when the first motorways appeared, and plans were made for the motorway A7 to be laid through this town, Terwispel split up into Tijnje and Terwispel as it now remains.

== Gallery ==
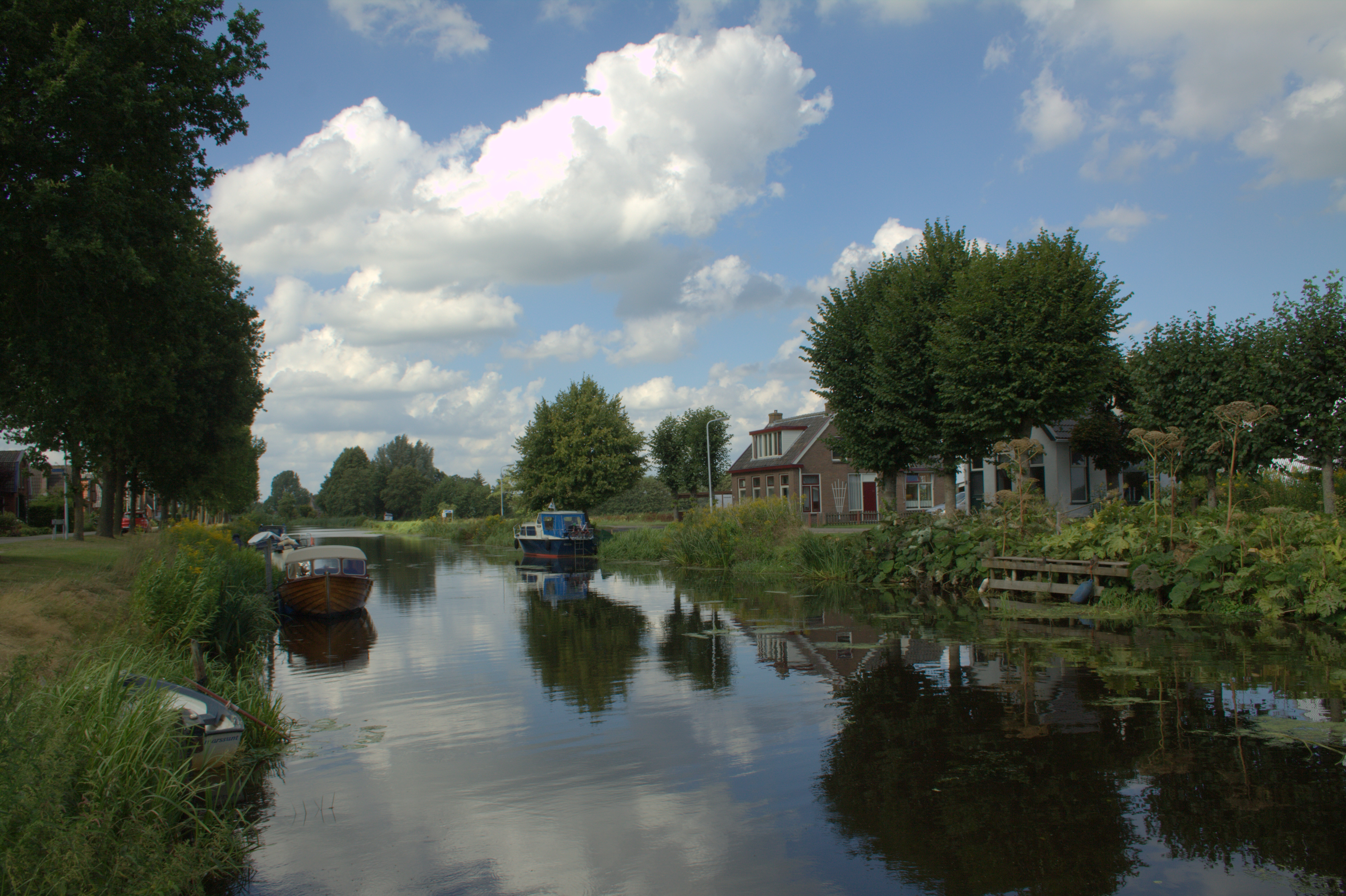
Canal at Terwispel

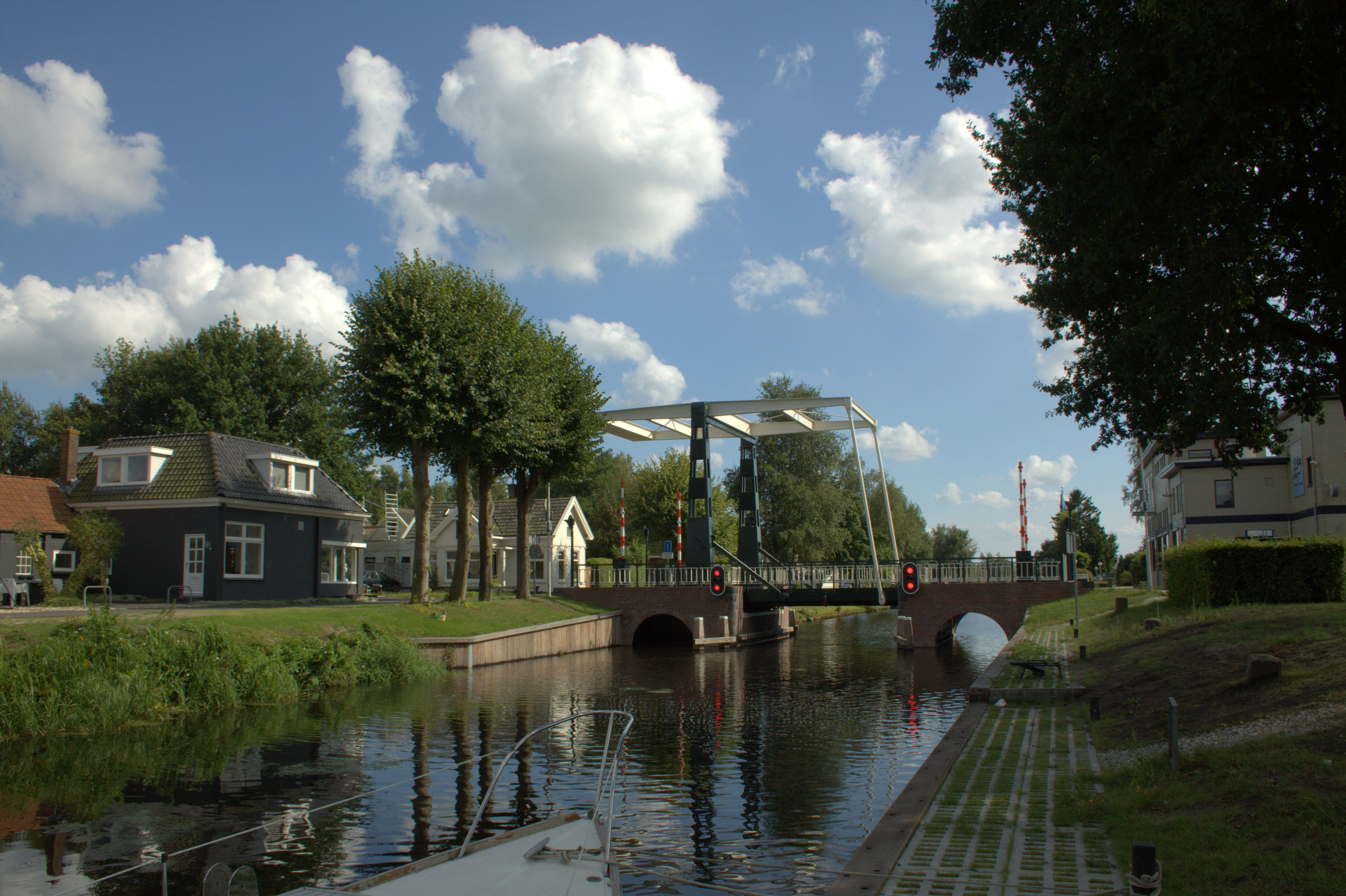
Bridge at Terwispel
