= Van Klaveren =

Family name

Van Klaveren is a Dutch toponymic surname meaning "from clovers"", perhaps referring to a dairy farmer's clover field. Notable people with the surname include:

- Adrian Van Klaveren (born 1961), British BBC executive
- Alberto van Klaveren (born 1948), Dutch-born Chilean diplomat
- Bep van Klaveren (1907–1992), Dutch Olympic and European champion boxer
- Gerard van Klaveren (born 1951), Dutch politician, Honorary Consul of Iceland
- Joram van Klaveren (born 1979), Dutch PVV politician
- Noël van Klaveren (born 1995), Dutch artistic gymnast
- Piet van Klaveren (1930–2008), Dutch boxer, younger brother of Bep
