= Boezemmolen, Tijnje =

Windmill in Tijnje, Netherlands

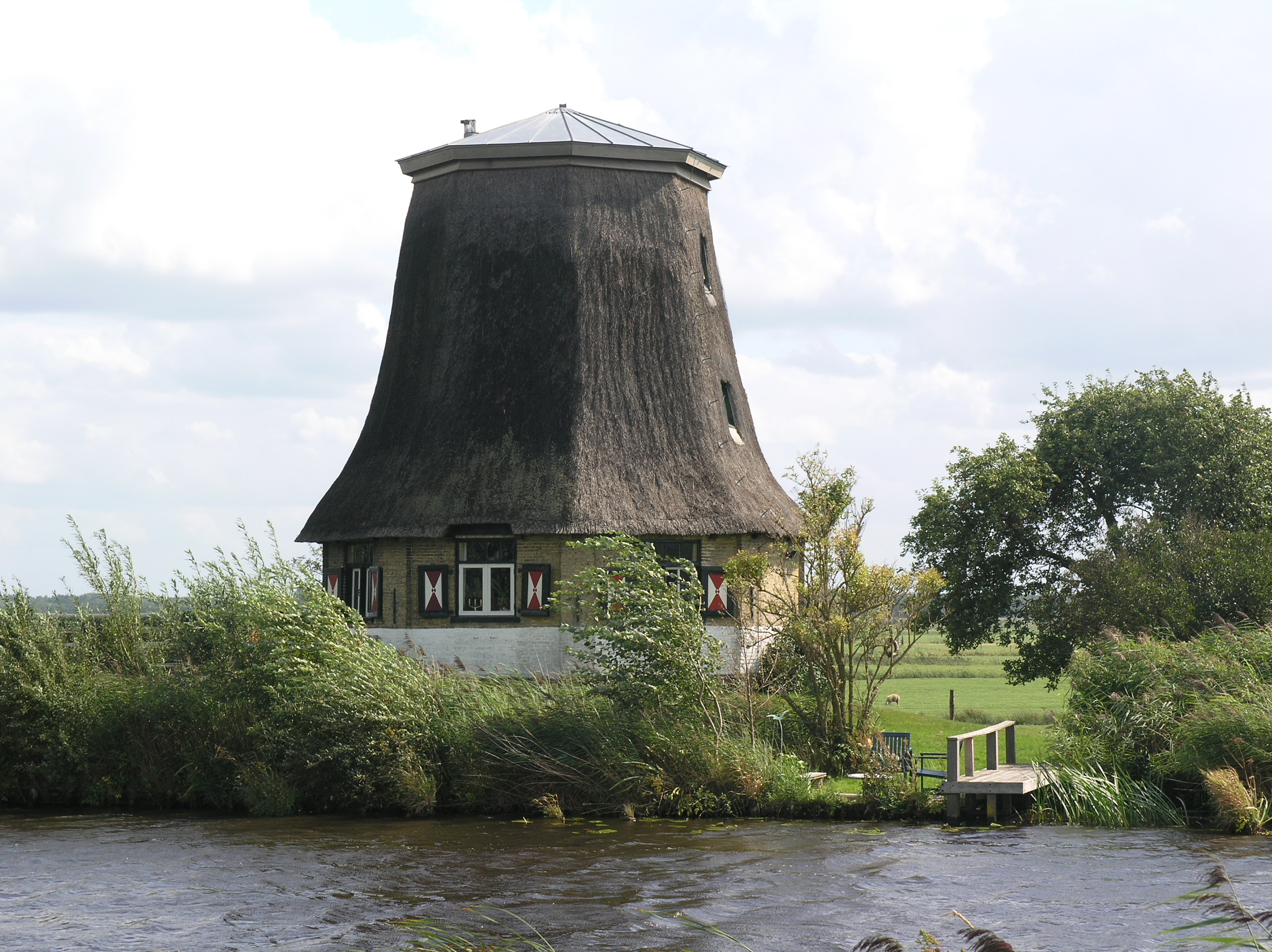
- Boezemmolen, August 2009.

Origin
- Mill name: Boezemmolen
- Mill location: Ulesprong 24, 8406 AH, Tijnje
- Coordinates: 53°03′24″N 5°58′10″E
- Operator(s): Private
- Year built: 1856

Information
- Purpose: Drainage mill
- Type: Smock mill
- Storeys: Two storey smock
- Base storeys: One storey base
- Smock sides: Eight sides
- No. of sails: Four sails
- Type of sails: Common sails
- Winding: Tailpole and winch
- Type of pump: Archimedes' screw

Boezemmolen is a smock mill in Tijnje, Friesland, Netherlands which was built in 1856 and dismantled in 1911. Formerly converted to residential use, the mill is under restoration. It is listed as a Rijksmonument.

== History ==
Boezemmolen was built in 1856 at a cost of ƒ11,073.06. Construction began in March and the mill was advertised as "new built" in the Leeuwarder Courant of 22 August 1856. It was one of seven mills that drained the Veenpolder. A pumping station was built in 1876, and the windmills were subsequently demolished. The mill was dismantled c.1911. It was subsequently converted to residential use for the keeper of a ferry. In 1968, the mill was struck by ball lightning. It was sold the following year and repaired and made habitable again, using parts from the wind saw mill De Visser, Leeuwarden, Friesland that had burnt down on 16 January 1964. In May 2012, plans to restore the mill were approved by the Gemeente Opsterland. As of November 2013, a new cap had been fitted to the mill by Bouwbedrijf Hiemstra, Tzummarum, Friesland. The mill is listed as a Rijksmonument, №510646.

== Description ==
Boezemmolen is what the Dutch describe as a Grondzeiler. It is a two storey smock mill on a single storey base. There is no stage, the sails formerly reaching almost to ground level. The mill was winded by tailpole and winch. The smock and cap are thatched. The sails were Common sails. They had a span of 25.00 metres (82 ft 0 in). The original upright shaft survives. The mill formerly drove an Archimedes' screw.
