= Adrian Van Klaveren =

British broadcasting executive

Adrian Van Klaveren (born 31 December 1961) is a British broadcasting executive at BBC News and Current Affairs.

== Early life ==
He attended the independent Bristol Grammar School and St John's College, Oxford where he read Modern History.

== Career ==
=== BBC ===
Van Klaveren joined the BBC as a news trainee in 1983. He was Head of Local Programmes (HLRP) at BBC West Midlands. He was Head of BBC Newsgathering for four years. He became deputy director of BBC News in December 2004.

He became Head of Five Live on 21 April 2008. At the time, Five Live had around 5.5 million listeners. In December 2012 he announced that he was leaving his post as Controller of Five Live.

Van Klaveren was Controller of the Great War Centenary at the BBC, which is covering the outbreak and centenary of WW1; he reported to Emma Swain, Controller of Knowledge Commissioning at BBC Television. He left this post in November 2014, becoming Head of Strategic Change in News and Current Affairs.

== Personal life ==
He enjoys cricket and Tottenham Hotspur F.C. Van Klaveren is a Dutch surname. He married Julie Stringer in August 1990 in Warrington. They have two sons, born February 1993 and January 1997.
