= Jonkerslân =

Jonkerslân Dutch: Jonkersland
- Village
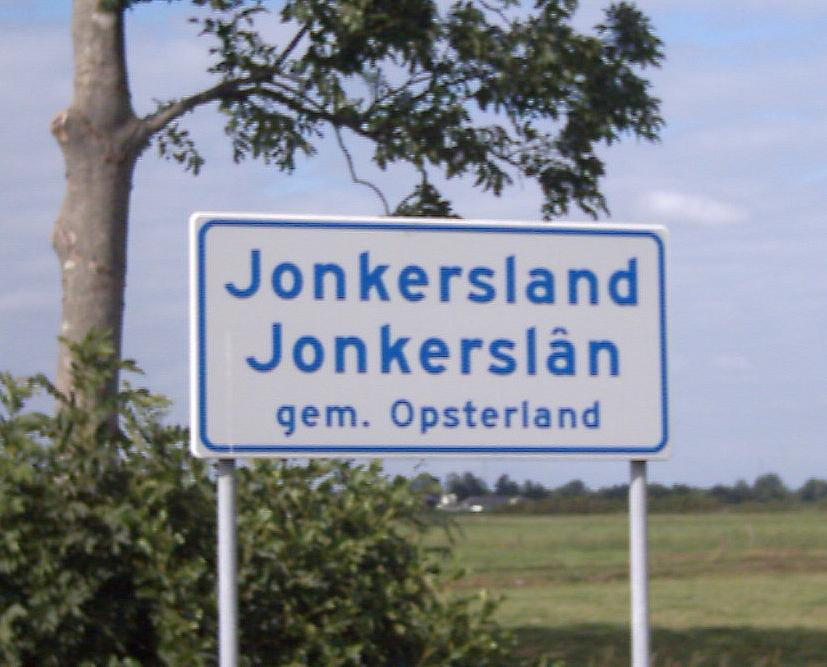

- Coat of arms

- Location in the Netherlands Jonkerslân (Netherlands)
- Coordinates: 52°58′47″N 6°2′28″E
- Country: Netherlands
- Province: Friesland
- Municipality: Opsterland

Area
  - Total: 4.65 km^{2} (1.80 sq mi)
- Elevation: 0.7 m (2.3 ft)

Population (2021)
  - Total: 295
  - Density: 63.4/km^{2} (164/sq mi)
- Time zone: UTC+1 (CET)
  - Summer (DST): UTC+2 (CEST)
- Postal code: 8403
- Dialing code: 0513

Jonkerslân (Dutch: Jonkersland) is a village consisting of around 295 inhabitants in the municipality of Opsterland in the east of Friesland, the Netherlands.

The village was first mentioned in 1899 as Jonkersland, and means land of the Jonkheer which is probably a reference to Juw Dekama. Jonkerslân developed into a peat colony in the 18th century. In 1988, it was awarded a village status.
