= Opsterland =

Opsterland Opsterlân
- Municipality
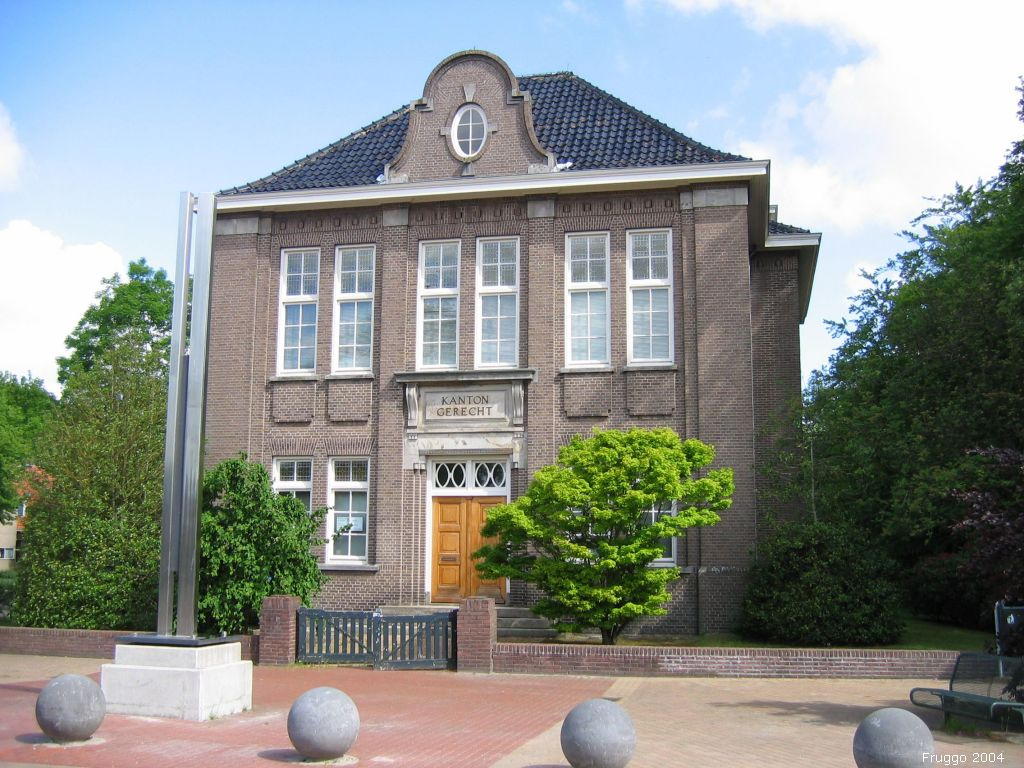
- Former court in Beetsterzwaag

- Flag Coat of arms

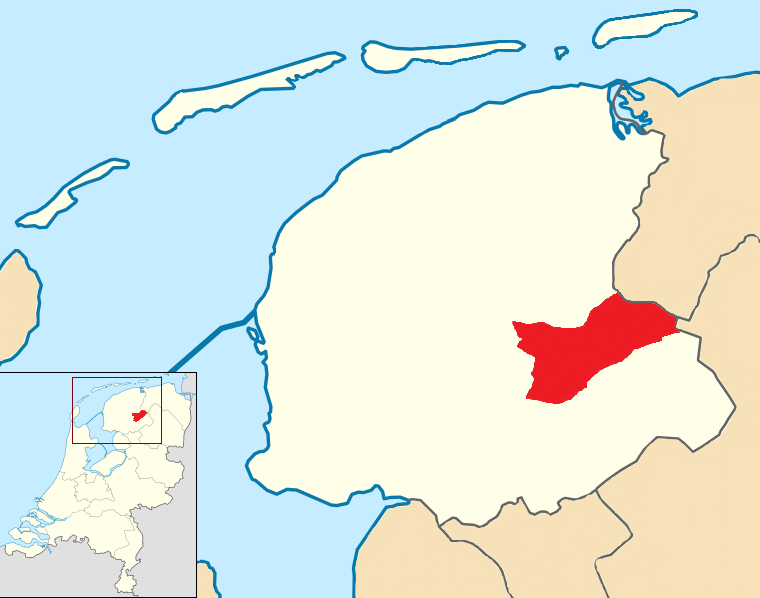
- Location in Friesland
- Coordinates: 53°4′N 6°5′E
- Country: Netherlands
- Province: Friesland

Government
  - Body: Municipal council
  - Mayor: Andries Bouwman (ChristenUnie)

Area
  - Total: 227.64 km^{2} (87.89 sq mi)
  - Land: 224.40 km^{2} (86.64 sq mi)
  - Water: 3.24 km^{2} (1.25 sq mi)
- Elevation: 3 m (9.8 ft)

Population (January 2021)
  - Total: 29,812
  - Density: 133/km^{2} (340/sq mi)
- Time zone: UTC+1 (CET)
  - Summer (DST): UTC+2 (CEST)
- Postcode: 8400–8409, 9240–9249
- Area code: 0512, 0513, 0516
- Website: www.opsterland.nl

Opsterland (Dutch pronunciation: [ˈɔpstərlɑnt]; West Frisian: Opsterlân) is a municipality in the province of Friesland in the Netherlands.

== Population centres ==
- Bakkeveen
- Beetsterzwaag
- Drachten-Azeven
- Frieschepalen
- Gorredijk
- Hemrik
- Jonkerslân
- Langezwaag
- Lippenhuizen
- Luxwoude
- Nij Beets
- Olterterp
- Siegerswoude
- Terwispel
- Tijnje
- Ureterp
- Wijnjewoude

Drachten-Azeven is an industrial zone of Drachten located in Opsterland.

=== Hamlets ===
The hamlets within the municipality are: Ald Beets, Allardsoog (partially), De Hanebuert, De Koaibosk, Easterein, Foarwurk, Haneburen, Heidehuizen, Hemrikerverlaat, Klein Groningen, Kortezwaag, Moskou (partially), Nieuwe Vaart, Petersburg (partially), Rolbrêge, Selmien, Sparjebird, Ulesprong, Ureterp aan de Vaart, Vosseburen, Welgelegen (partially), Wijngaarden and Wijnjeterpverlaat.

=== Topography ===
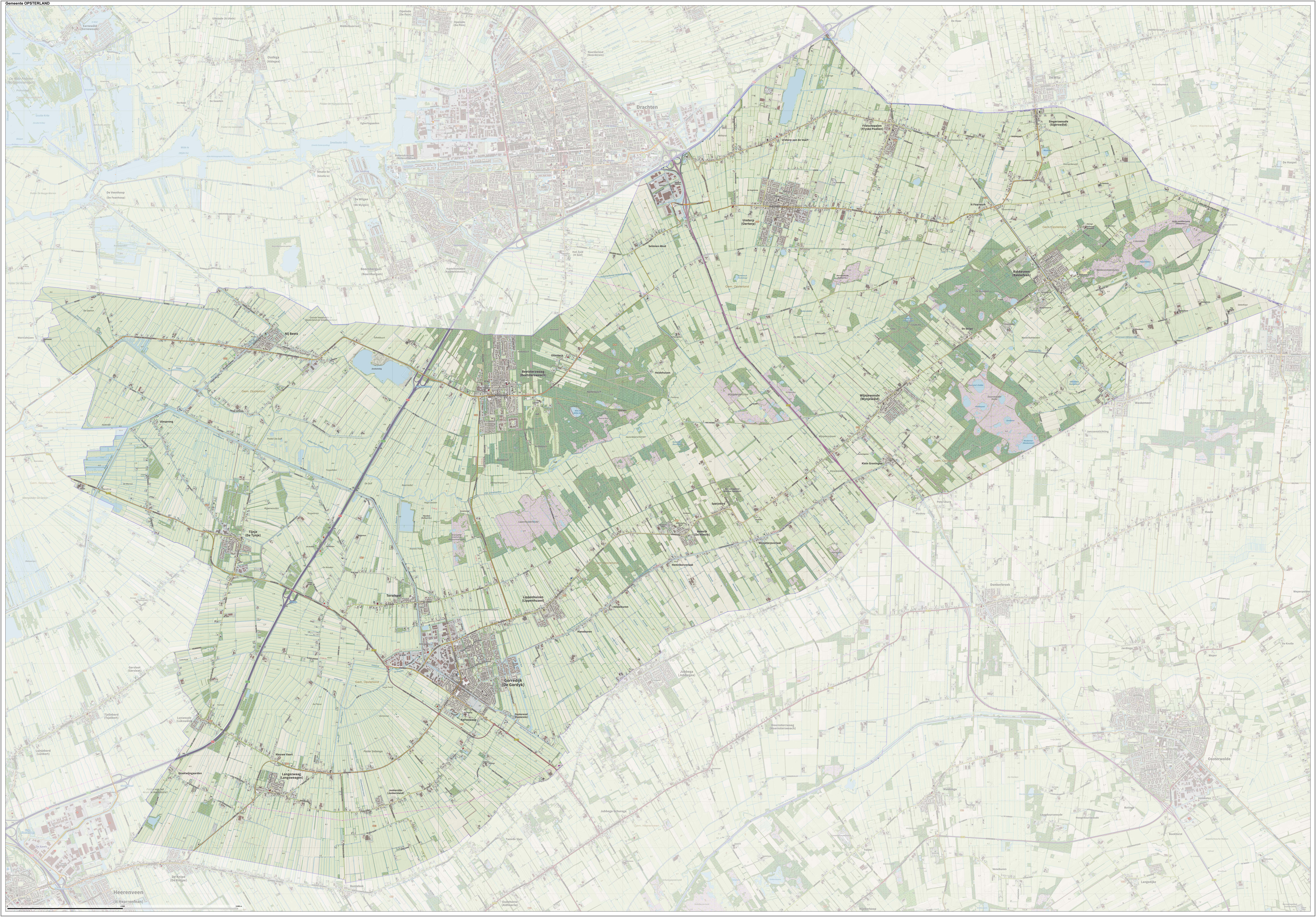
Map of the municipality of Opsterland, September 2023

== International relations ==
=== Twin towns — sister cities ===
Opsterland is twinned with:

- Ra'anana, Israel (since 1963)
- Beit Sahour, Palestine

The choice of twinning with both an Israeli city and a Palestinian one is Opsterland's modest contribution to trying to solve the Israeli-Palestinian Conflict. As well as bilateral contacts with both of their partners, the Dutch officials try to encourage trilateral meetings and induce greater contact between Ra'anana and Beit Sahour, which are located at a short geographical distance from each other but are separated by conflict and mutual mistrust. In 2012 Francisca Ravestein, Nahum Hofree, Hani Al-Hayik – the mayors, respectively, of Opsterland, Ra'anana and Beit Sahour – jointly inaugurated a photo exhibition at the municipal building in Opsterland.

== Notable people ==
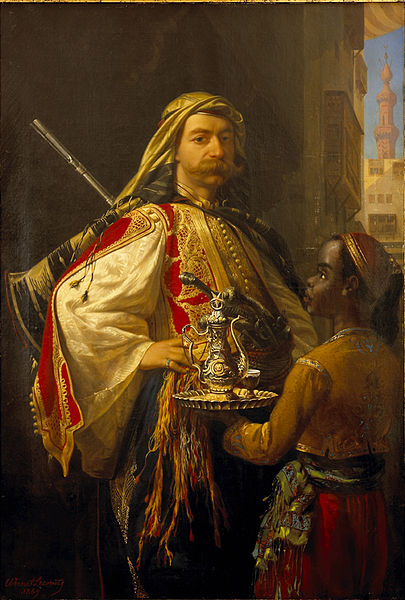
Tinco Lycklama, 1869

- Tinco Martinus Lycklama à Nijeholt (1837 in Beetsterzwaag – 1900) a Frisian aristocrat, adventurer, writer, socialite and a Dutch orientalist
- Sytze Wierda (1839 in Hemrik – 1911) an architect and engineer, worked on the architecture of the South African Republic
- Tjeerd Bottema (1884 in Langezwaag – 1978) a painter, illustrator and book cover designer
- Gerrit Roorda (1890 in Tijnje – 1977), communist politician
- Hein Vos (1903 in Tijnje – 1972) a politician and economist
- Eduard Meine van Zinderen-Bakker (1907 in Opsterland – 2002) a Dutch-born South African palynologist
- Gerard van Klaveren (born 1951 in Terneuzen) a Dutch politician

=== Sport ===
- Riemer van der Velde (born 1940 in Bakkeveen) the former chairman of football club SC Heerenveen
- Foppe de Haan (born 1943 in Lippenhuizen) a Dutch football coach with SC Heerenveen
- Lieuwe de Boer (born 1951 in Ureterp) a former ice speed skater, bronze medallist at the 1980 Winter Olympics
- Hilbert van der Duim (born 1957 in Beetsterzwaag) a Dutch former speed skater, participated in the 1980 and 1984 Winter Olympics

== Gallery ==
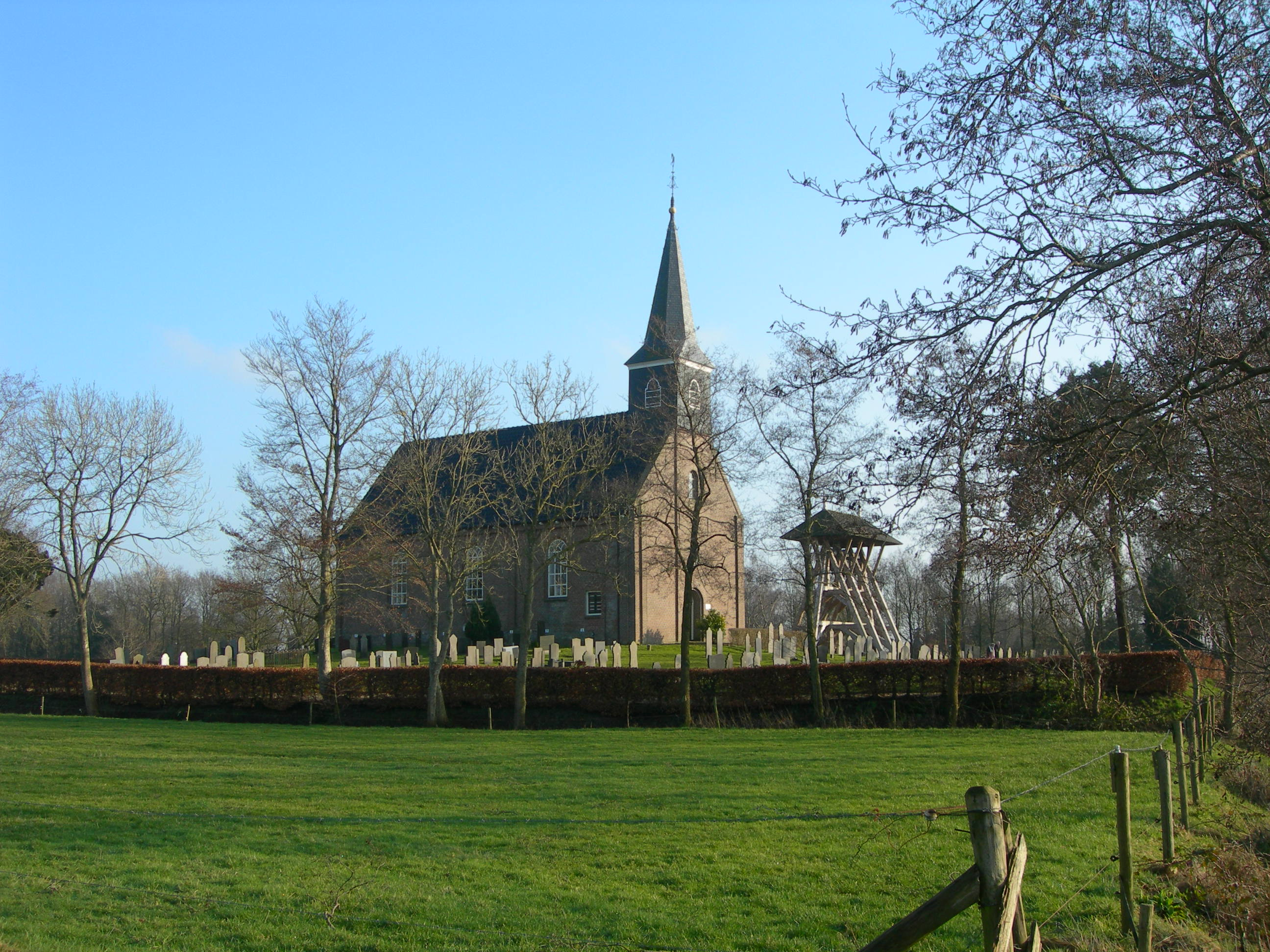
Kerk Wijnjewoude

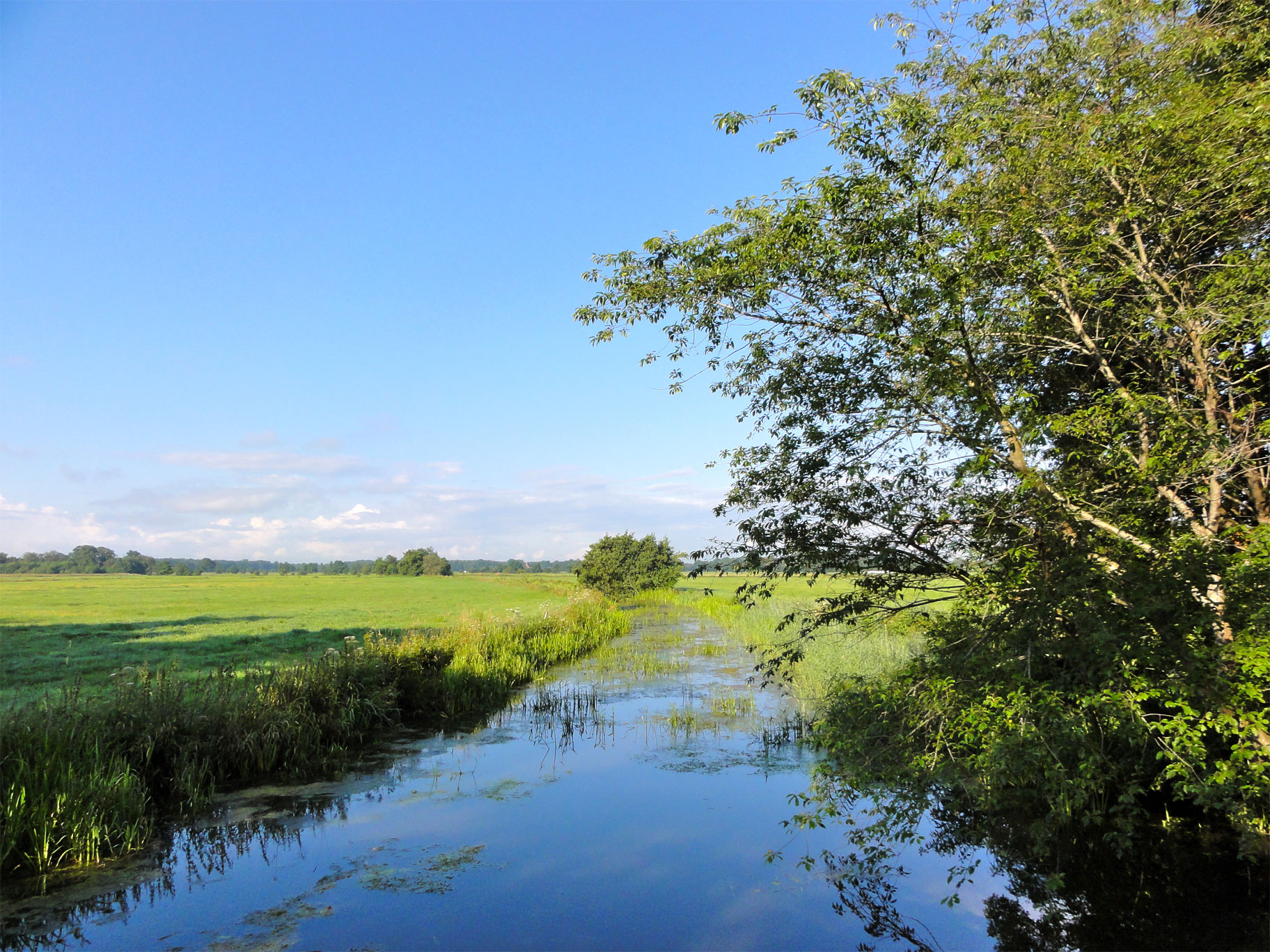
Koningsdiep at the Lippenhuisterbrug

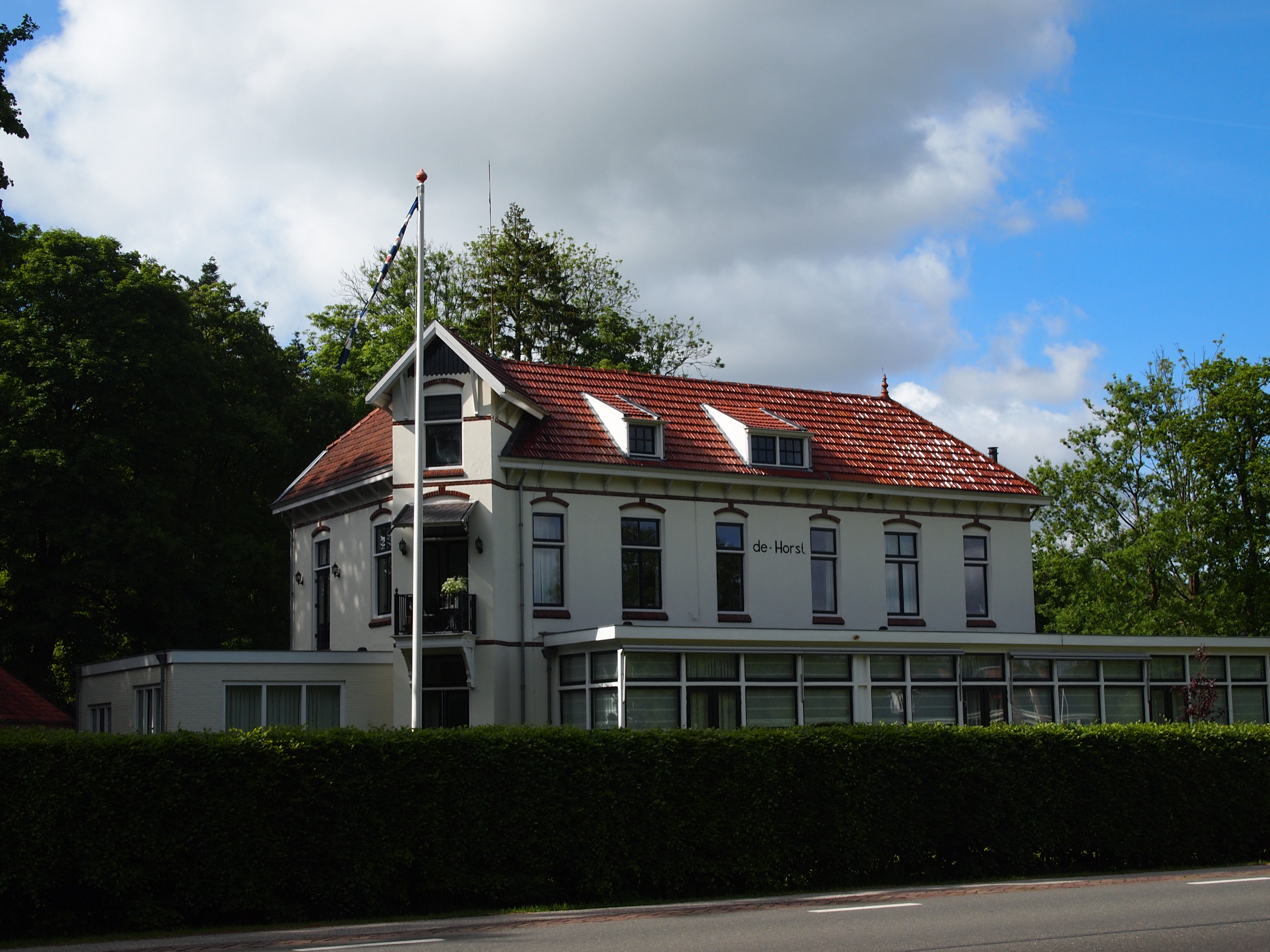
De Horst

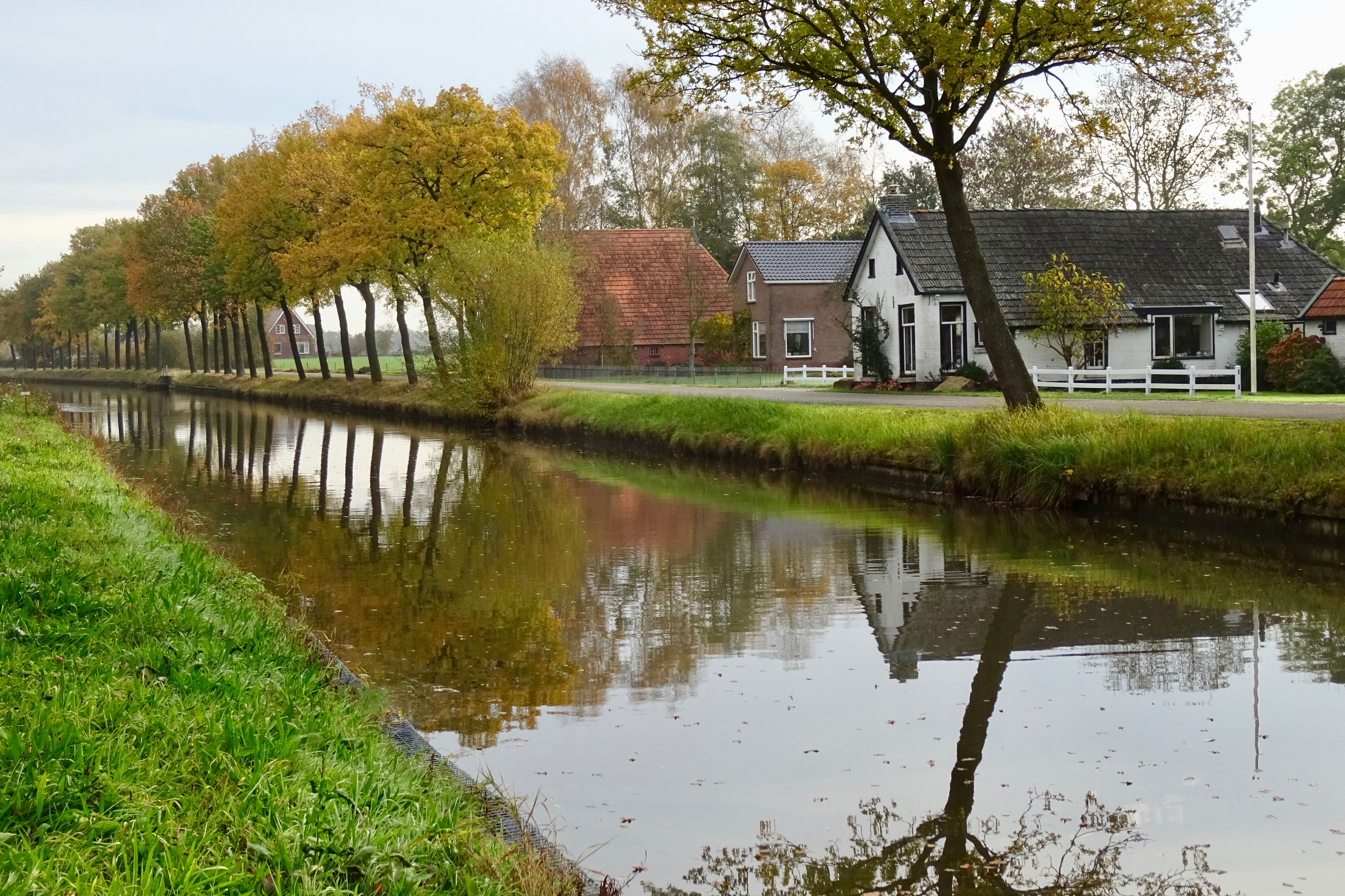
Wijnjeterpverlaat Opsterlandse Compagnonsvaart
