= Siegerswoude =

Siegerswoude Sigerswâld
- Village
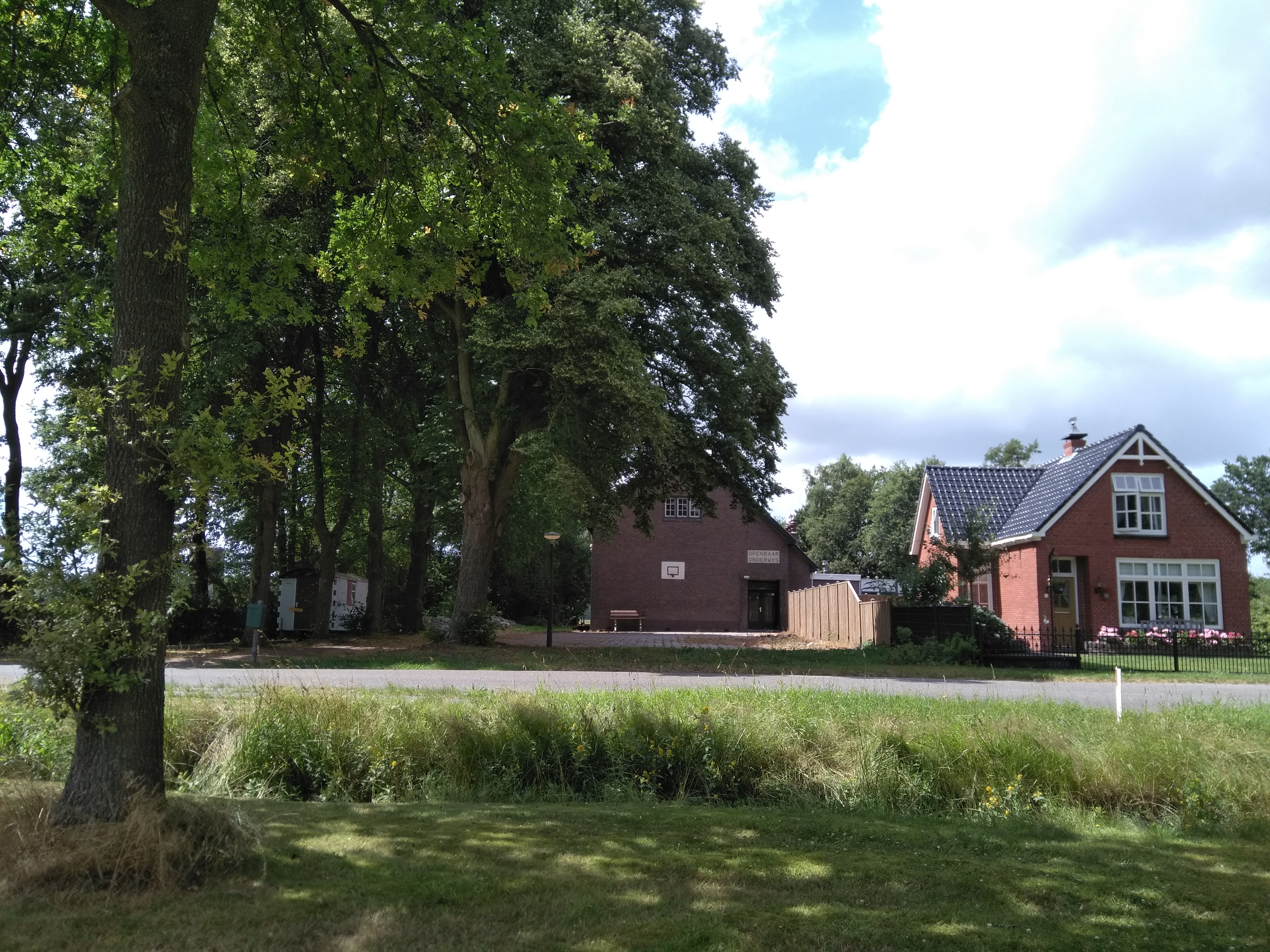
- Former school

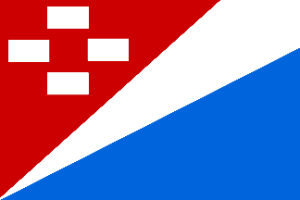
- Flag Coat of arms

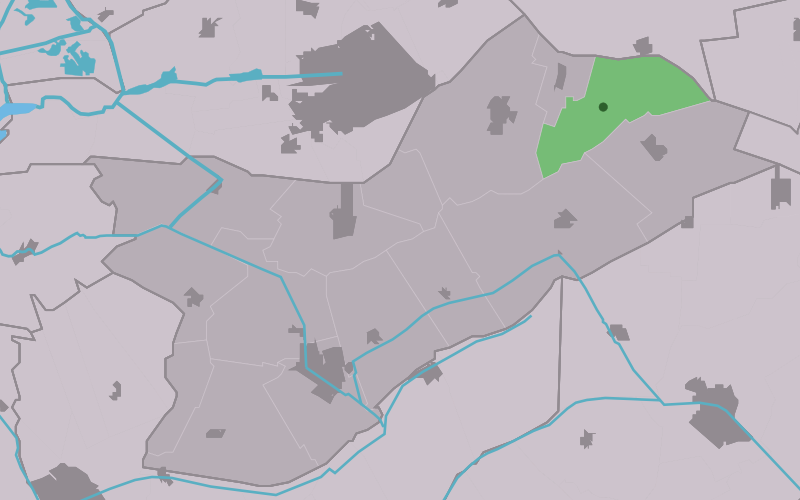
- Location in Opsterland municipality

- Location in the Netherlands Siegerswoude (Netherlands)
- Country: Netherlands
- Province: Friesland
- Municipality: Opsterland

Area
  - Total: 14.62 km^{2} (5.64 sq mi)
- Elevation: 5 m (16 ft)

Population (2021)
  - Total: 835
  - Density: 57.1/km^{2} (148/sq mi)
- Time zone: UTC+1 (CET)
  - Summer (DST): UTC+2 (CEST)
- Postal code: 9248
- Dialing code: 0512

Siegerswoude (West Frisian: Sigerswâld) is a village in the municipality of Opsterland in eastern Friesland, the Netherlands. It had a population of around 810 in January 2017.

The village was first mentioned in 1315 as Sigerwolde, and means "the woods of Sieger (person)". Siegerwoude developed as three little hamlets in a peat excavation area. The Dutch Reformed church dated from 1910, but burnt down in 1941. In 1949, it was rebuilt.

Siegerwoude was home to 210 people in 1840.

== Gallery ==
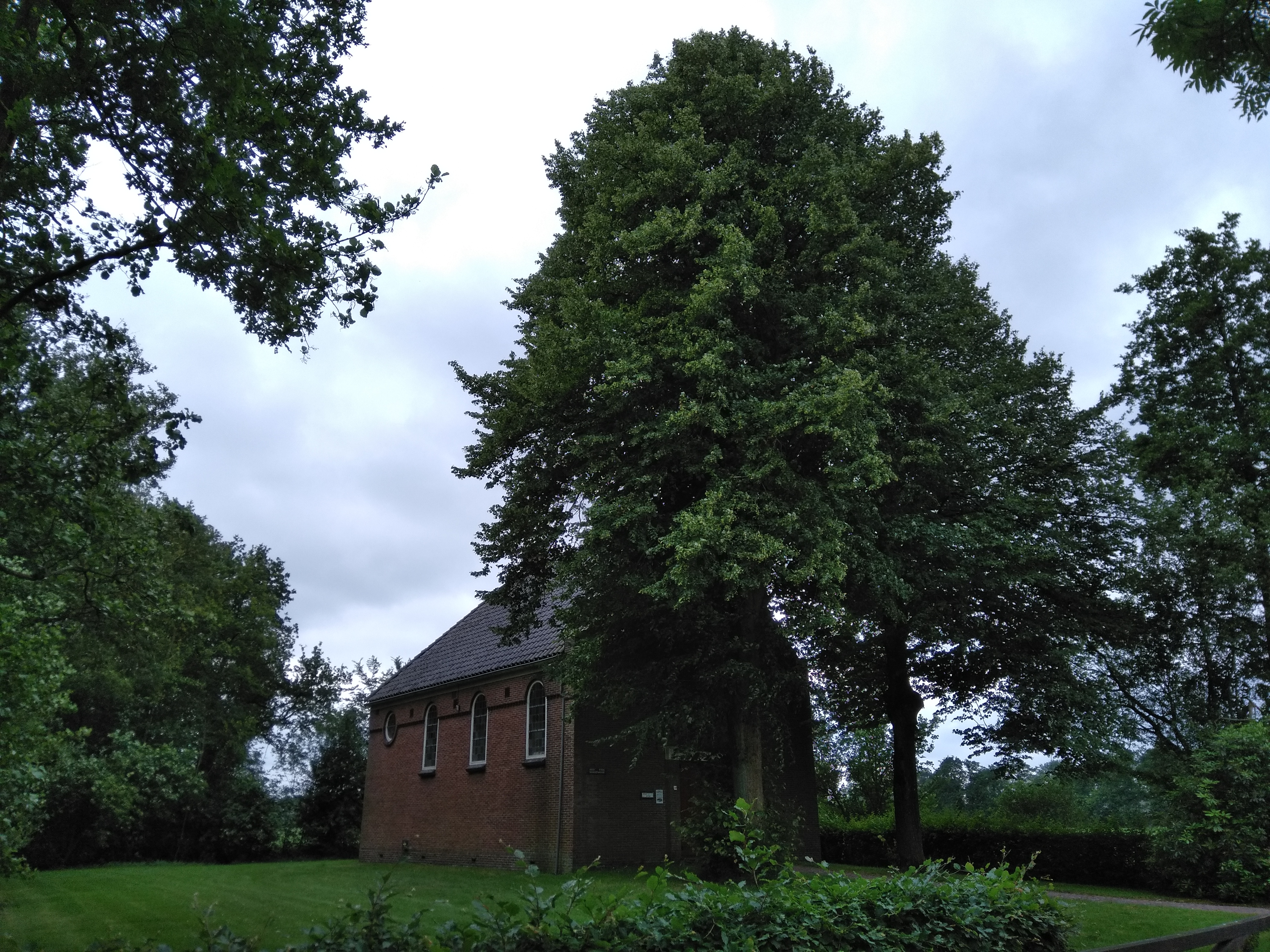
Dutch Reformed church

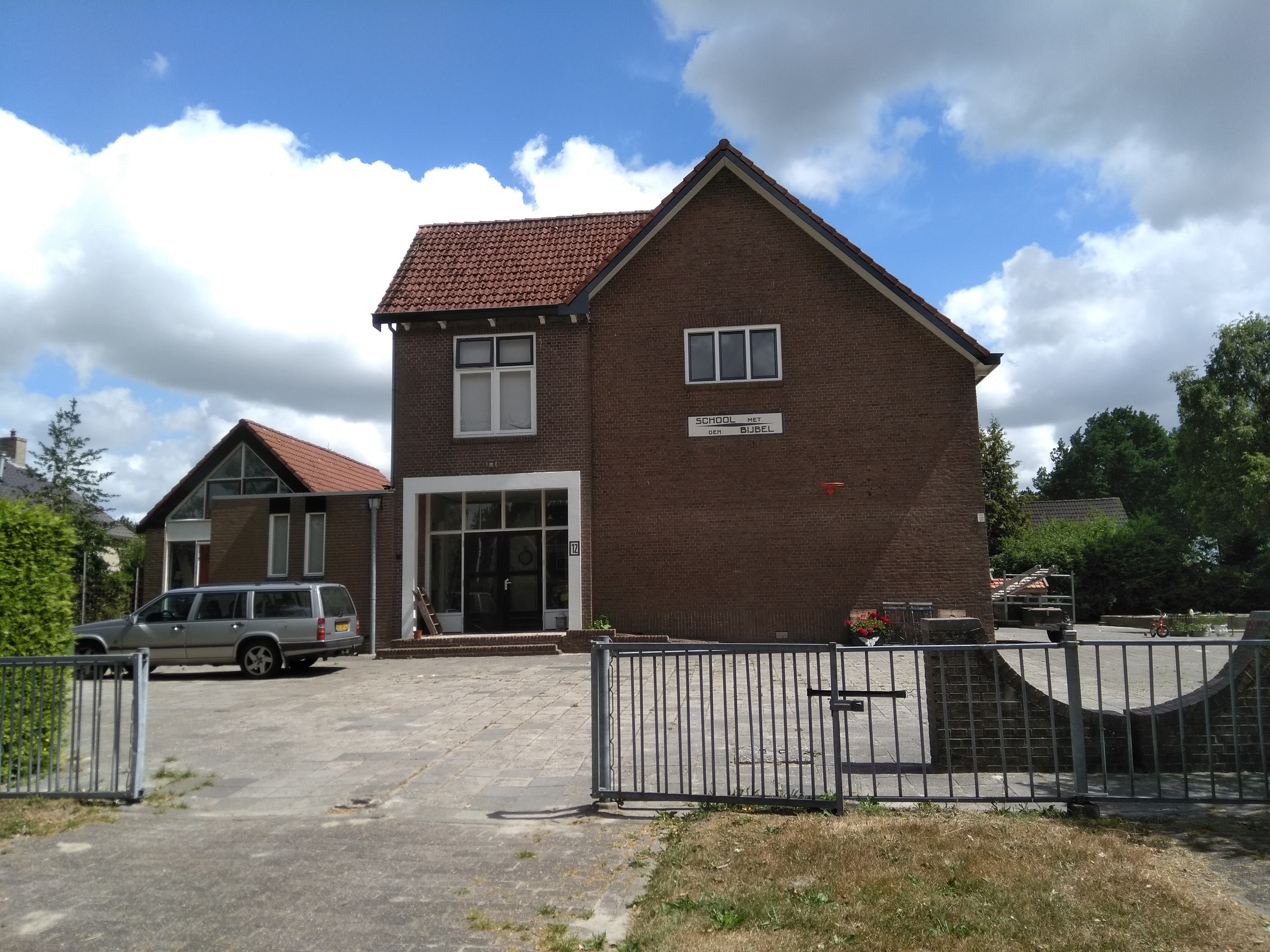
Former Christian school

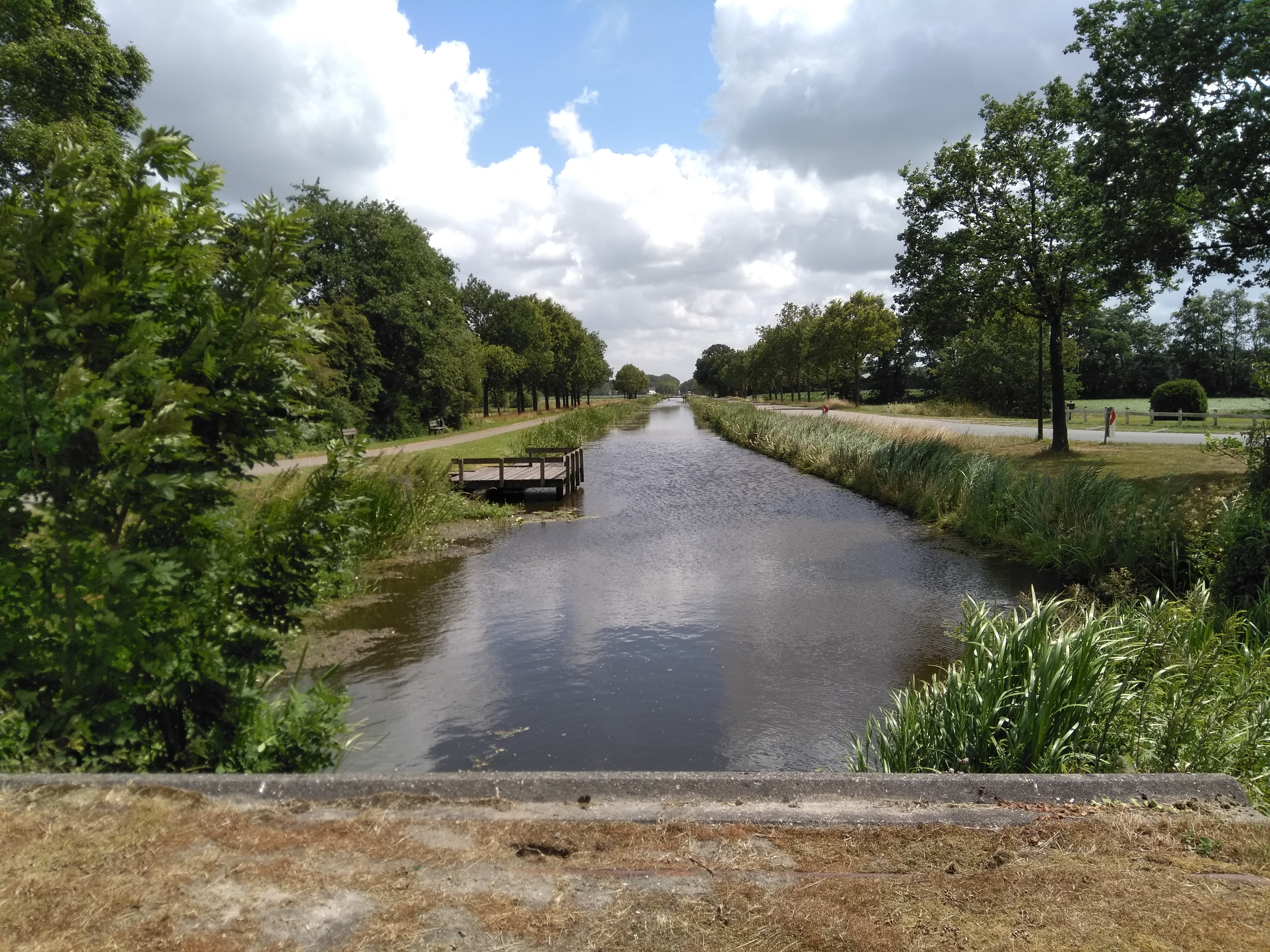
Canal view

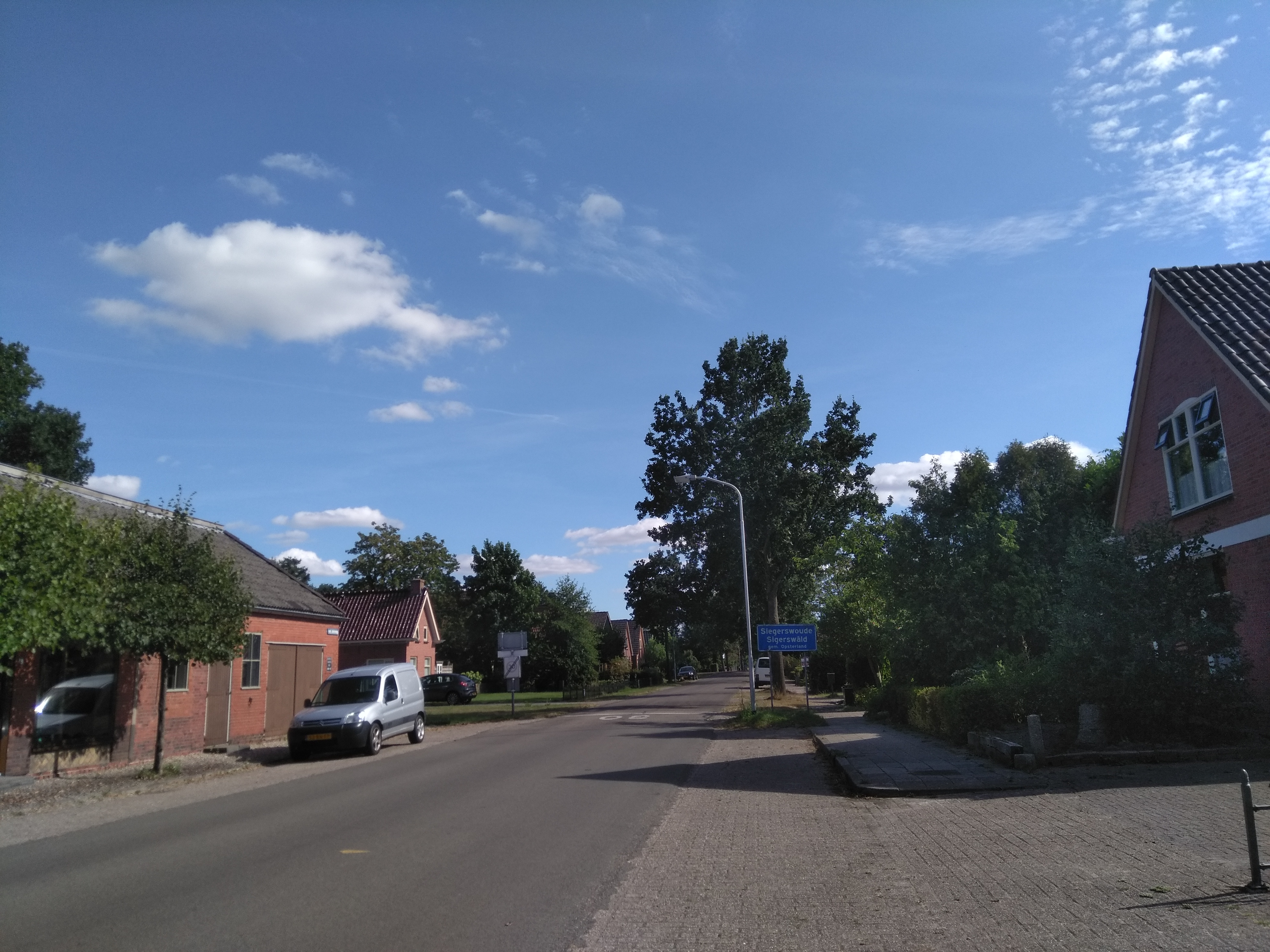
Welcome to Siegerswoude
