= Foppe de Haan =

Dutch football coach (born 1943)

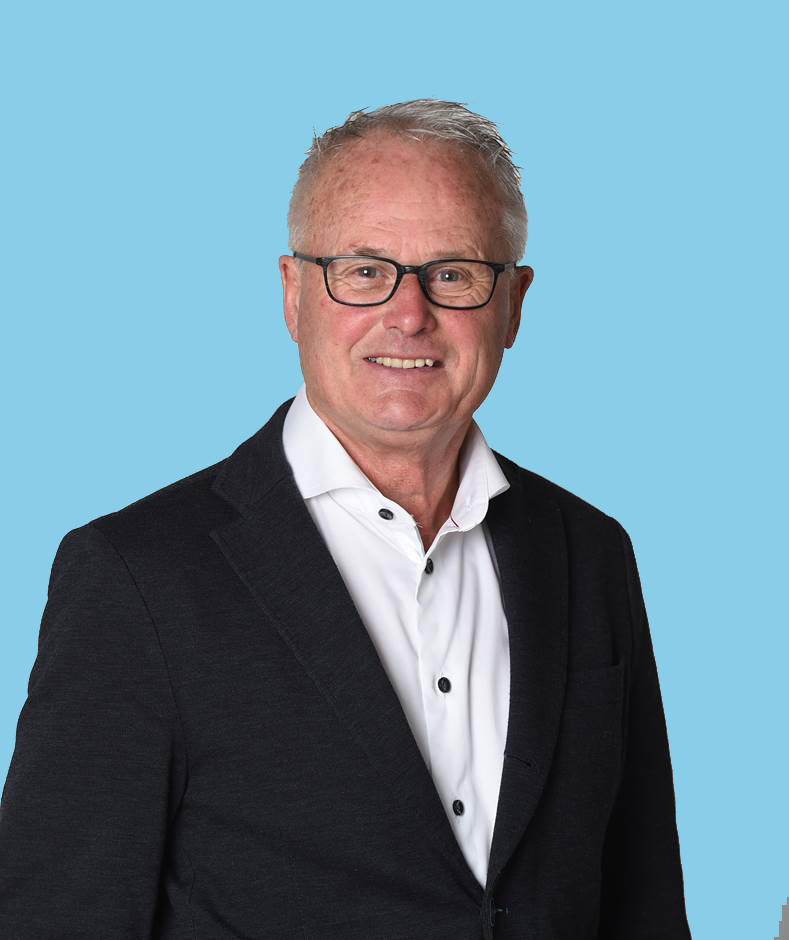
- De Haan in 2017

Personal information
- Full name: Foppe Geert de Haan
- Date of birth: 26 June 1943 (age 83)
- Place of birth: Lippenhuizen, Netherlands
- Position: Midfielder

Youth career
- 1956–1957: SV THOR
- 1957–1961: GAVC

Senior career*
Years	Team	Apps	(Gls)
1961–1963	GAVC		
1963–1965	VV Heerenveen		
1965–1968	GAVC		
1968–1970	Zuid Eschmarke		
1970–1973	Akkrum		
1973–1974	Enschedese Boys		

Managerial career
- 1974–1978: VV Akkrum
- 1976–1977: Heerenveen (youth)
- 1977–1980: Drachtster Boys
- 1980–1983: ACV
- 1983–1985: Steenwijk
- 1985–1988: Heerenveen
- 1992–2004: Heerenveen
- 2004–2009: Netherlands U21
- 2008: Netherlands U23
- 2006–2007: Indonesia U23
- 2009–2011: Ajax Cape Town
- 2011: Tuvalu
- 2015−2016: Heerenveen (interim)
Medal record
Men's football
Representing Netherlands (as manager)
UEFA European Under-21 Championship
Winner	2006
Winner	2007
- * Club domestic league appearances and goals

Foppe Geert de Haan (Dutch pronunciation: [ˈfɔpə də ˈɦaːn], born 26 June 1943) is a Dutch football coach. He is known for his long association with Frisian club Heerenveen. De Haan was the manager of the Tuvalu national team during 2011 and then rejoined Heerenveen's youth programme. He is also a politician for the Partij van de Arbeid.

== Career ==
De Haan was born in Lippenhuizen, Friesland. He started his managerial career in 1974 with VV Akkrum. After two years, he combined this role with the youth team manager's position at Heerenveen. By 1978, he had become the manager for Drachtster Boys. He then moved to ACV in 1980, and to Steenwijk in 1983. In 1985, de Haan re-joined Heerenveen, this time as an assistant coach. He continued to spend the next 20 years with the club—the longest time a coach worked for a Dutch professional football club. De Haan was promoted to become the head coach in 1992. In 1993, he led the club back to the Eredivisie. They finished in the Eredivisie with Heerenveen in 2000, as the second place. Thus, they qualified for the UEFA Champions League for the first time in the club's history.

In 2003, he received the Sport Award and on 10 May 2004, after his final game as coach of Heerenveen, he was acknowledged as a Knight of the Order of Orange-Nassau. He was successively appointed as coach of the Netherlands U21 national team (Dutch: Jong Oranje), with whom he won the 2006 UEFA European Under-21 Football Championship and 2007 UEFA European Under-21 Football Championship.

De Haan was accused by Steven Taylor of calling him a "cheat" as he had been injured in the match and was originally not going to take a penalty in the semi-final penalty shoot-out. Taylor eventually took and scored his penalty in the shootout which made the Netherlands won despite the act. A semifinal spot in the latter tournament also qualified the Dutch for the 2008 Summer Olympics football tournament, leading his side to the quarter-finals where they were ultimately defeated by Argentina after extra time.

De Haan had announced that he would retire from football at the end of the 2008–09 season, when his contract with the KNVB expired. Instead he returned to work as a senior advisor at SC Heerenveen, before being appointed head coach at South African Premier Soccer League club Ajax Cape Town.

De Haan managed the Tuvalu national team through their 2011 Pacific Games campaign. De Haan left his post after the tournament to rejoin Heerenveen's youth programme.

On 20 October 2015, De Haan became interim coach of SC Heerenveen after the team had a disappointing start of the season and Dwight Lodeweges left as head coach. Under De Haan the team went on to win four of their first six games, drawing and losing one.

== Honours ==
Netherlands

- UEFA European Under-21 Championship: 2006, 2007

Individual

- Rinus Michels Lifetime Achievement Award (Rinus Michels Oeuvreprijs): 2009
