= Olterterp =

- Village
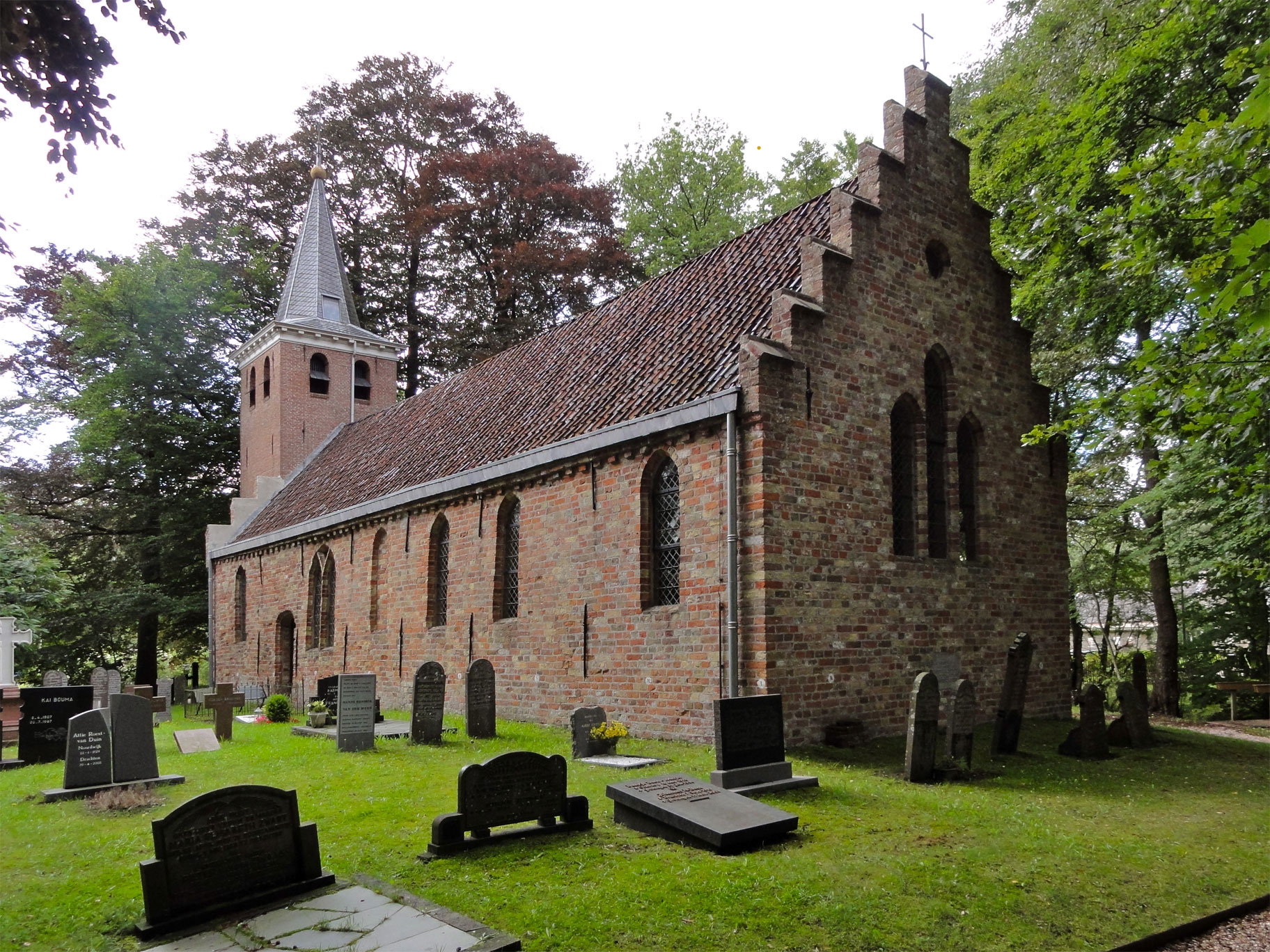
- Saint-Hippolytus in Olterterp, 15th century

- Flag Coat of arms

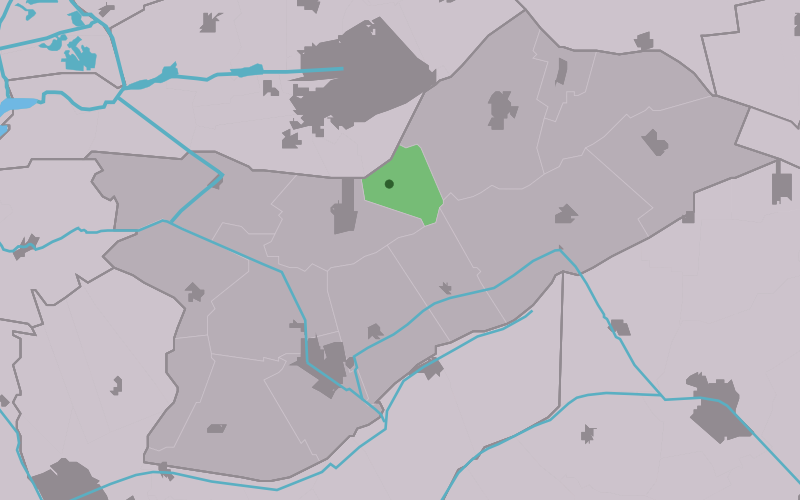
- Location in Opsterland municipality

- Location in the Netherlands Olterterp (Netherlands)
- Country: Netherlands
- Province: Friesland
- Municipality: Opsterland

Area
  - Total: 6.20 km^{2} (2.39 sq mi)
- Elevation: 1.9 m (6.2 ft)

Population (2021)
  - Total: 80
  - Density: 13/km^{2} (33/sq mi)
- Time zone: UTC+1 (CET)
  - Summer (DST): UTC+2 (CEST)
- Postal code: 9246
- Dialing code: 0512

Olterterp is a village in the municipality of Opsterland in the east of Friesland, the Netherlands. It had a population of around 75 in January 2017.

The village was first mentioned in 1505 as Otterterp, and means "outer settlement". The Dutch Reformed church was built in 1414 or 1415 as a replacement of an earlier church. The church was built without a tower. The tower was added in 1744.

Olterterp was home to 154 people in 1840. Most of the land was owned by Ambrosius Ayso van Boelens. Around 1850, van Boelens started to cultivate the wilderness and turn it into farmland.

== Gallery ==
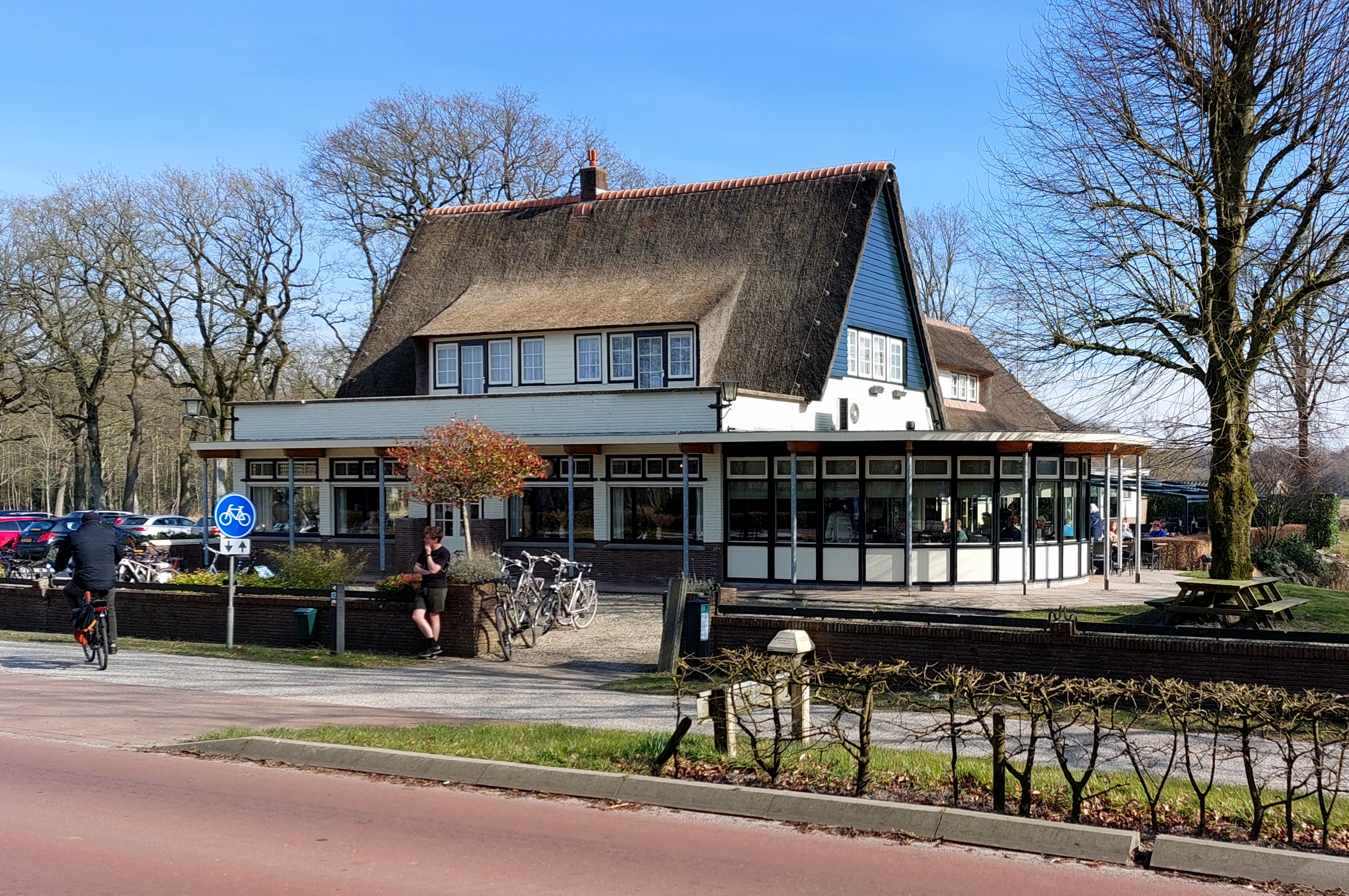
Restaurant Wite Hûs

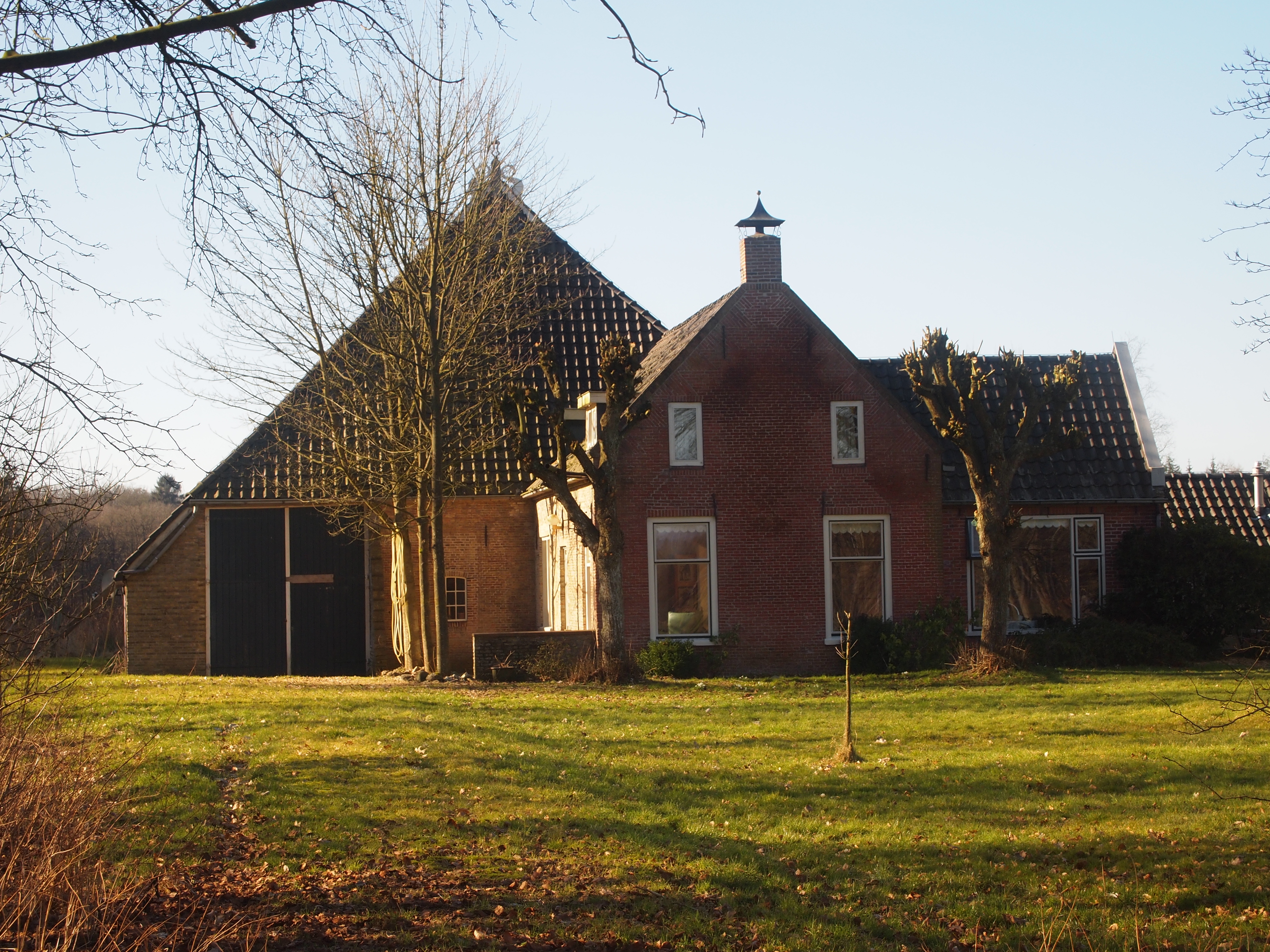
Farm in Olterterp

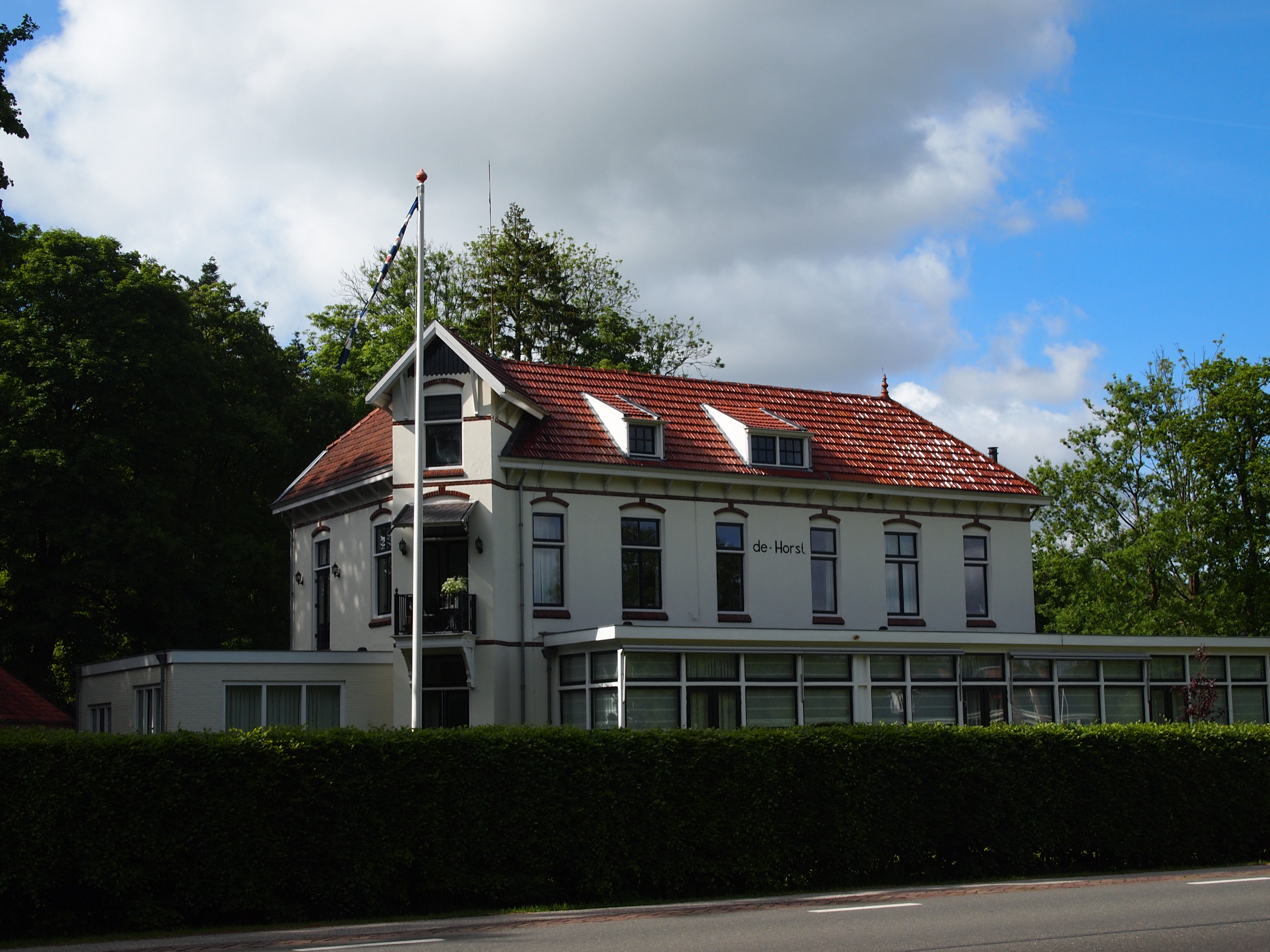
De Horst

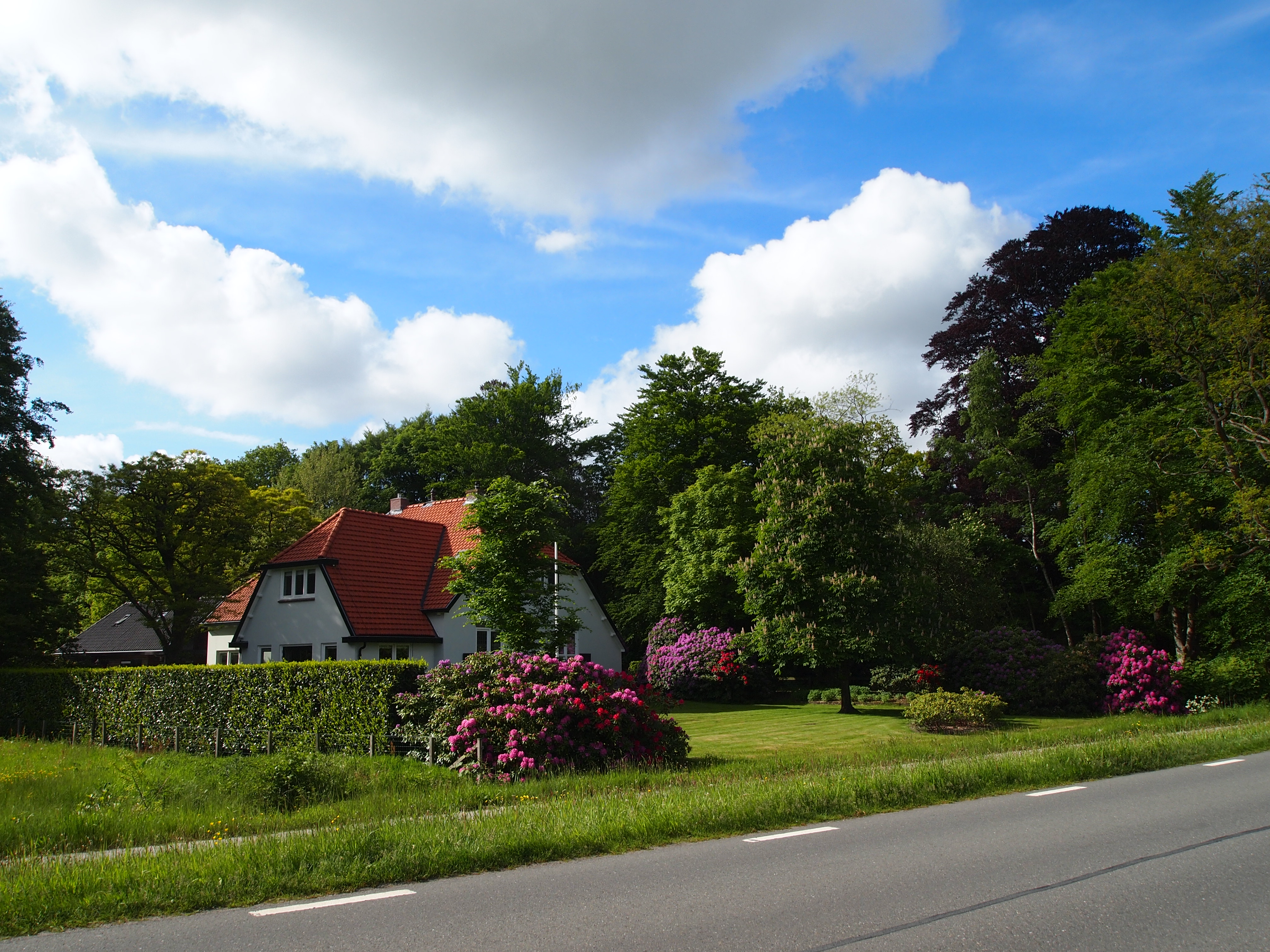
Klein Olderterp
