= Tijnje =

Tijnje De Tynje
- Village
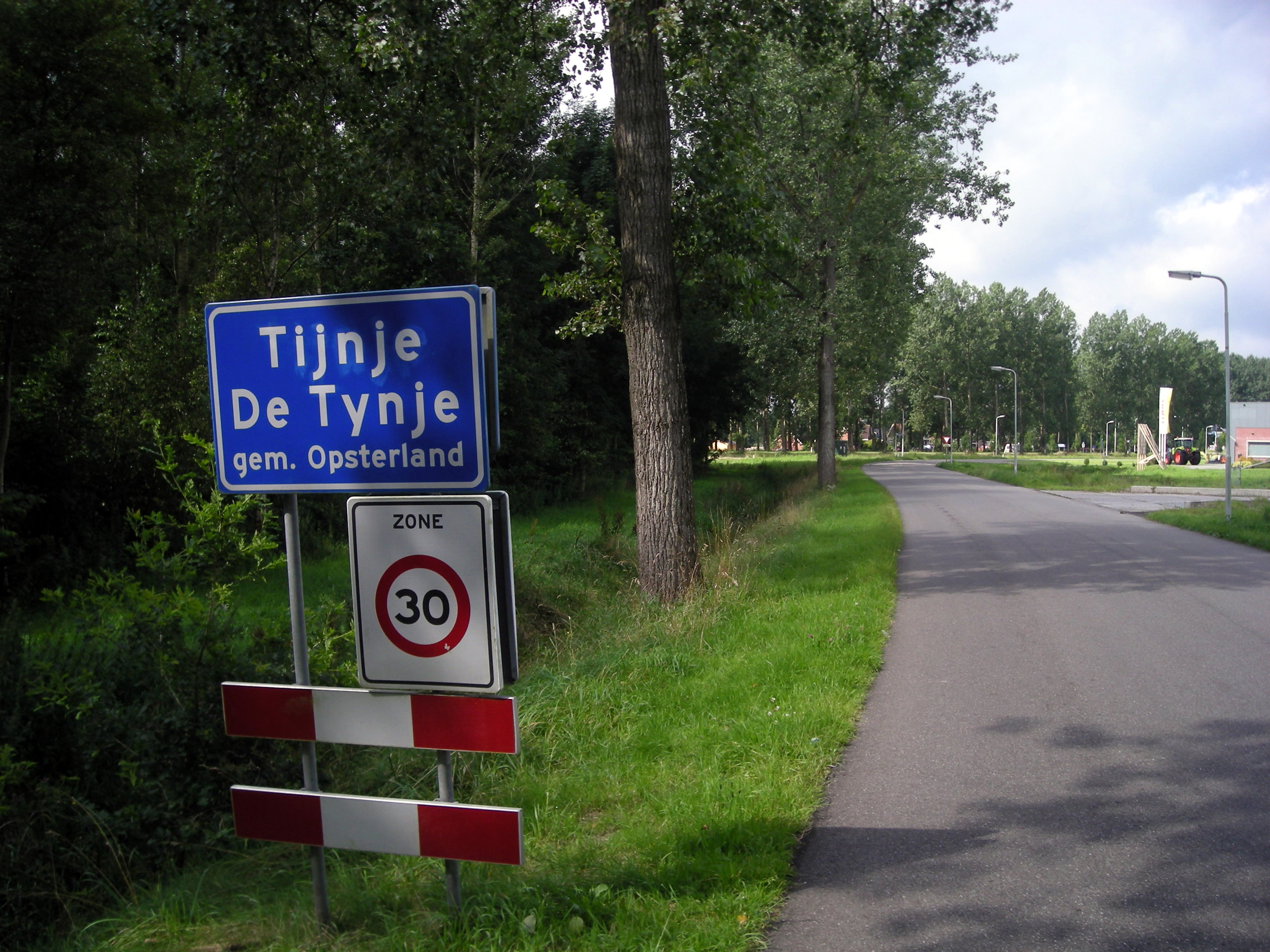
- Tijnje

- Coat of arms

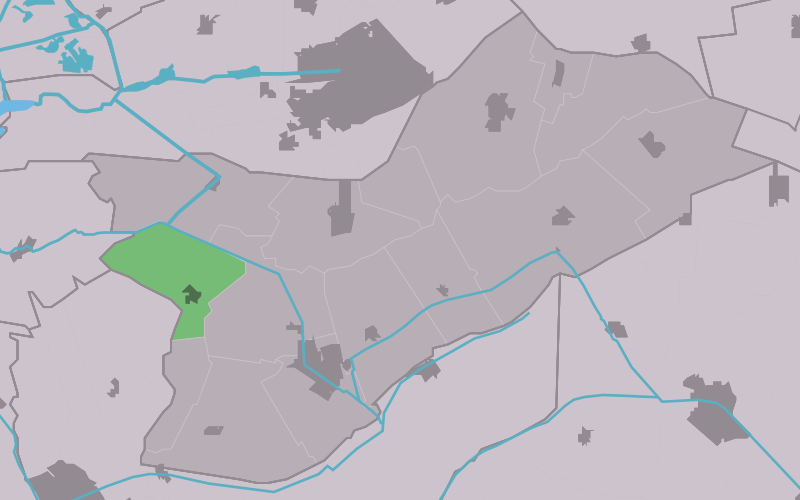
- Location in Opsterland municipality

- Location in the Netherlands Tijnje (Netherlands)
- Country: Netherlands
- Province: Friesland
- Municipality: Opsterland

Area
  - Total: 13.51 km^{2} (5.22 sq mi)
- Elevation: −1.0 m (−3.3 ft)

Population (2021)
  - Total: 1,530
  - Density: 113/km^{2} (293/sq mi)
- Time zone: UTC+1 (CET)
  - Summer (DST): UTC+2 (CEST)
- Postal code: 8406
- Dialing code: 0513
- Website: Official

Tijnje (West Frisian: De Tynje) is a village in the municipality of Opsterland in the east of Friesland, the Netherlands. It had a population of around 1,510 in January 2017.

There are two windmills in the village, Boezemmolen and De Deelen. The latter is a tjasker.

== History ==
The village was first mentioned in 1718 as "Winie Tinie, Luxter Tinie", and means "willow braided fence". Tijnje developed around 1870 as a peat excavation village. The Dutch Reformed church was built in 1890. The Reformed Churches is a concrete building from 1921, and is an early concrete building.

Tijnje was home to 14 people in 1840. The local car dealer started a collection of old Opel cars. The collection of c. 55 cars is at display at the Opel Oldtimer museum in Tijnje.

== Gallery ==
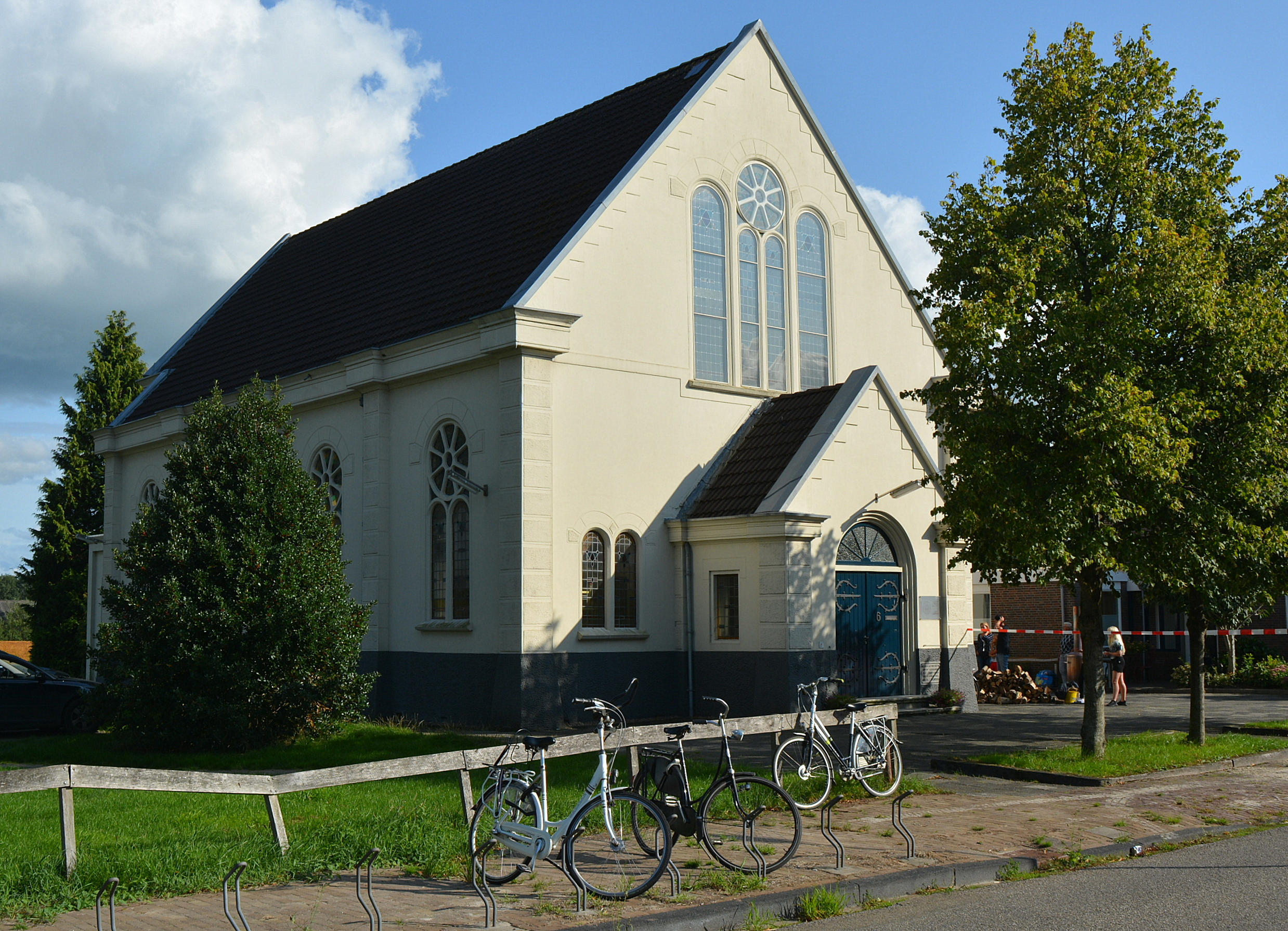
Reformed Church

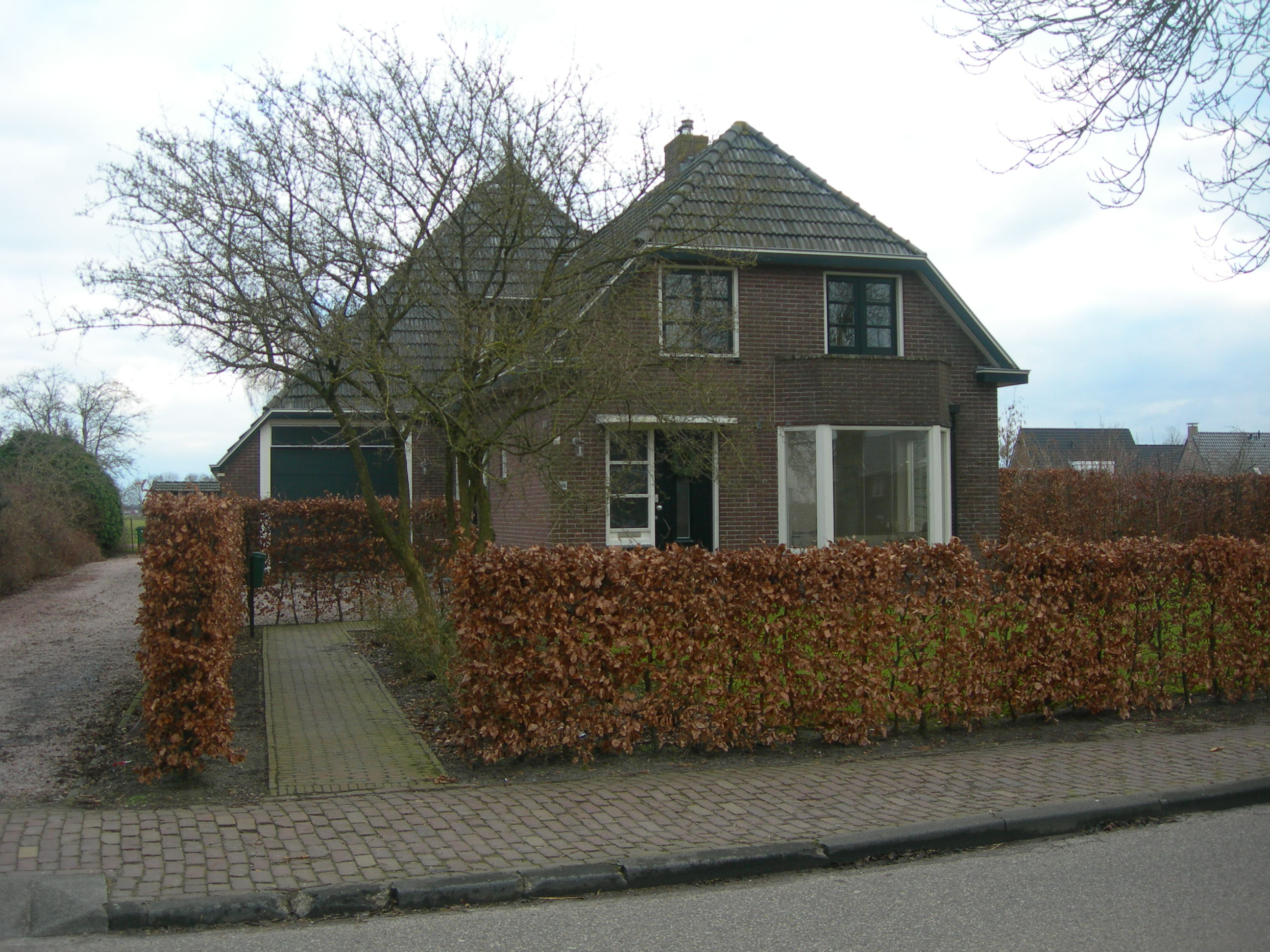
Farm De Kramer Pleats

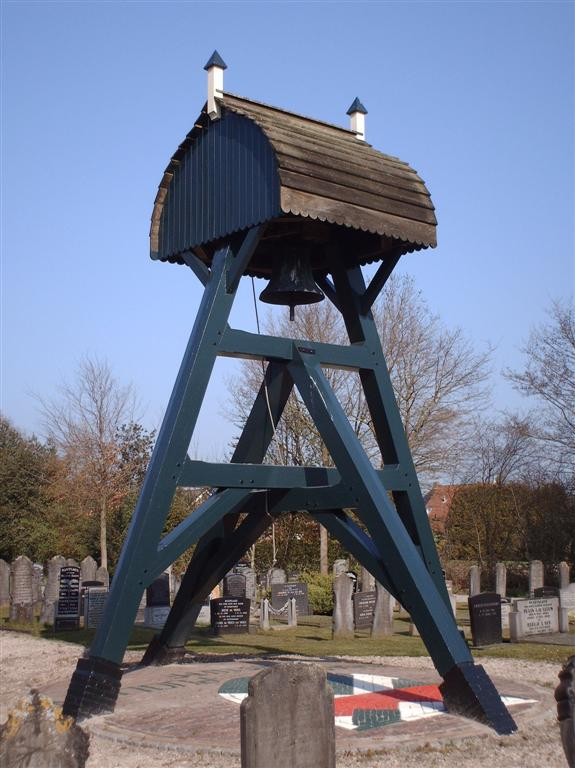
Bell tower
