= Luxwoude =

Luxwoude Lúkswâld
- Village
- Coat of arms

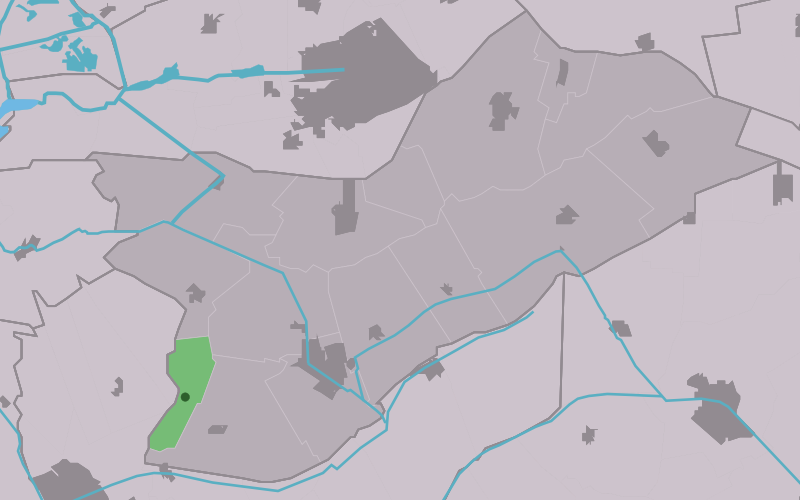
- Location in Opsterland municipality

- Location in the Netherlands Luxwoude (Netherlands)
- Coordinates: 52°59′48″N 5°58′50″E
- Country: Netherlands
- Province: Friesland
- Municipality: Opsterland

Area
  - Total: 5.07 km^{2} (1.96 sq mi)
- Elevation: 0 m (0 ft)

Population (2021)
  - Total: 430
  - Density: 85/km^{2} (220/sq mi)
- Time zone: UTC+1 (CET)
  - Summer (DST): UTC+2 (CEST)
- Postal code: 8405
- Dialing code: 0513

Luxwoude (West Frisian: Lúkswâld) is a village in the municipality of Opsterland in the east of Friesland, the Netherlands. It had a population of around 275 in January 2017.

The village was first mentioned in 1315 as Lukeswalde, and means the forest of Lucas (person). See also: Lucaswolde. Luxwoude developed as a peat excavation village. It was home to 137 people in 1840.
