= Gerard van Klaveren =

Dutch politician (born 1957)

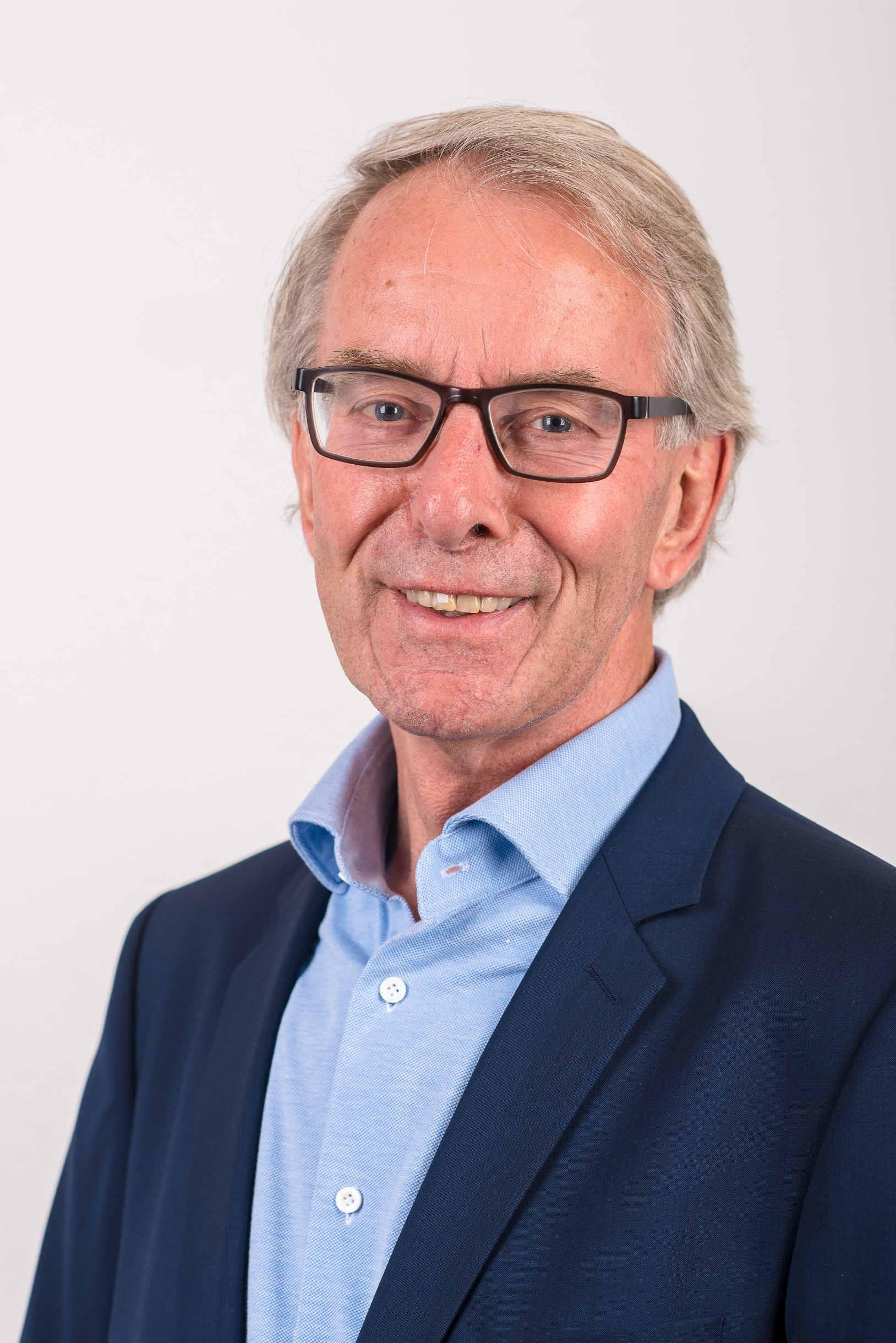
van Klaveren in 2020

Gerard van Klaveren (born 7 May 1951 in Terneuzen) is a Dutch politician. From 2005 to 2017, he has been mayor of the Dutch municipality of Weststellingwerf, and from 2018 to 2020, he has been acting mayor from the island of Ameland. In 2003, he became Honorary Consul of Iceland.

== Career ==
From 1995 to 2003, he was member of the Provincial Government of Friesland and delegate for economic affairs, tourism and agriculture. In that capacity, he initiated the Frisian Lakes Project in 1999, an investment of 330 million euros in order to upgrade the quality of the Frisian Lakes and surrounding area. Previously, from 1982 to 1989, he was chairman of the Liberal Group in the municipality Council of Opsterland and from 1988 to 1995 chairman of the Liberal Group in the Provincial Government of Friesland. Originally Van Klaveren was a sworn broker and evaluator of commercial real estate at DTZ Zadelhoff.

In 1997, Van Klaveren took the initiative for the placement of a statue in Grolloo of Harry (Cuby) Muskee, singer of Cuby + Blizzards. In 2000, he founded the Heritage Foundation Muskee, which in 2011 realized the C+B Museum in Grolloo. In 2009, Van Klaveren founded the Liet International Foundation. This foundation organizes an international song festival on a yearly basis for songs in European minority languages.

In 1999, the Dutch Minister of Economic Affairs appointed Van Klaveren as chairman of the Steering Committee Certification Agency. The assignment was to develop a widely supported certification scheme for estate agents and evaluators. The minister felt the need to do so because of the abolition of the then existing title protection system. The relevant certification scheme was established in 2000.

== Books and publications ==
Published by W. J. Thieme & Cie Publishers, Zutphen:

- 1981 De Labrador Retriever
- 1982 De Golden Retriever
- 1985 De Flat Coated Retriever
- 1985 De Frisian Stabij en Wetterhoun
- 1986 Het Kooikerhondje
- 1989 Jachthonden (Gundogs)

Commissioned by the Association for Stabij and Wetterhounen:

- 1987 De Fryske Hounen
