= Lippenhuizen =

Lippenhuizen Lippenhuzen
- Village
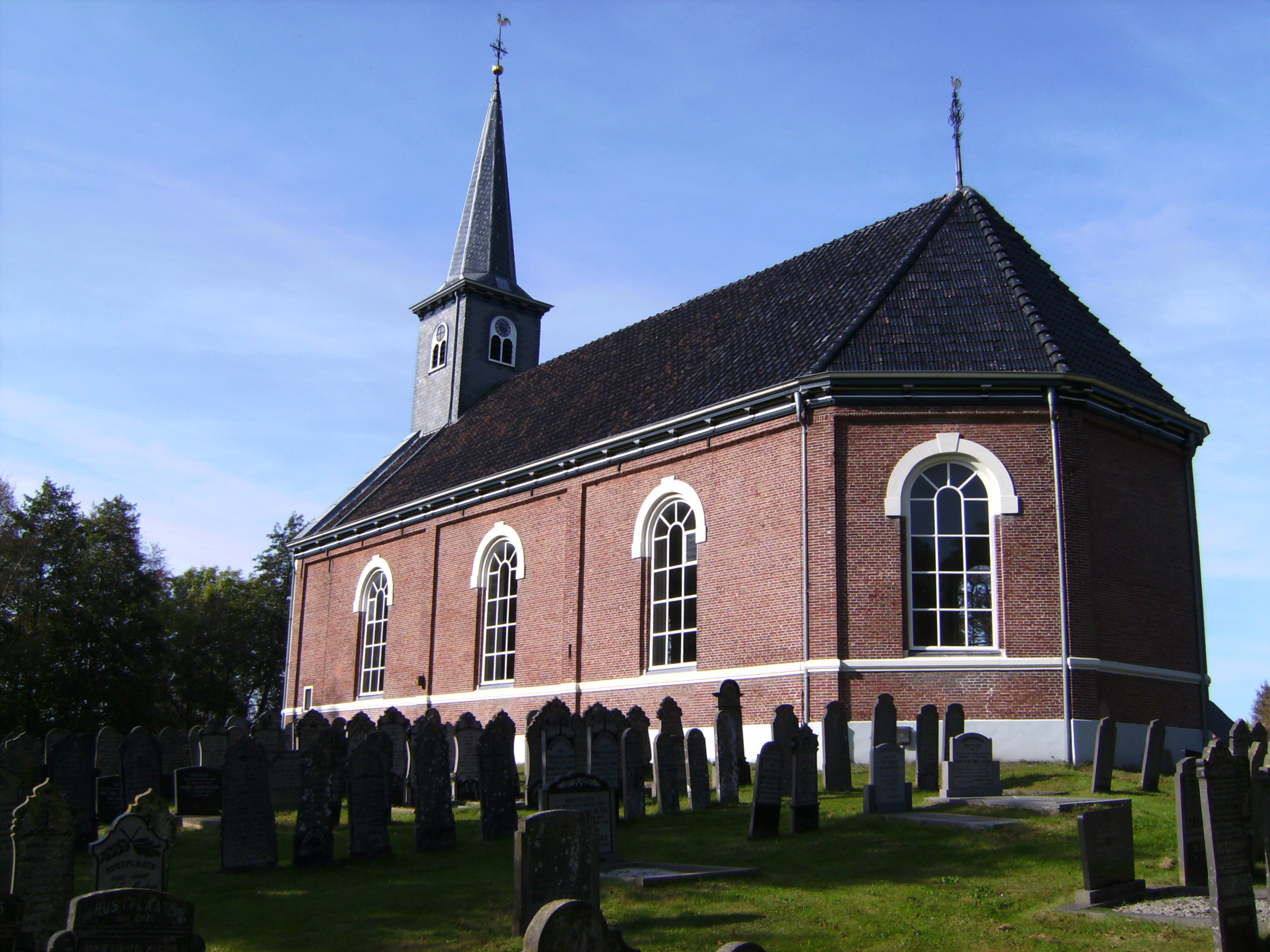
- Lippenhuizen church

- Coat of arms

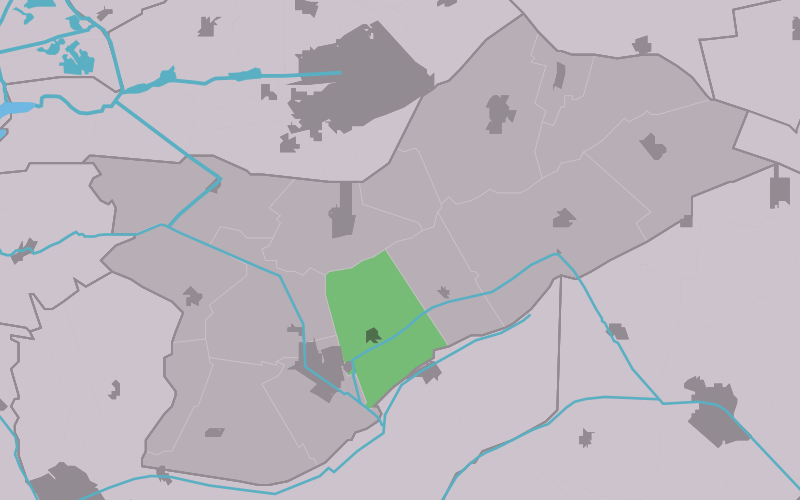
- Location in Opsterland municipality

- Location in the Netherlands Lippenhuizen (Netherlands)
- Country: Netherlands
- Province: Friesland
- Municipality: Opsterland

Area
  - Total: 16.15 km^{2} (6.24 sq mi)
- Elevation: 1.9 m (6.2 ft)

Population (2021)
  - Total: 1,300
  - Density: 80/km^{2} (210/sq mi)
- Time zone: UTC+1 (CET)
  - Summer (DST): UTC+2 (CEST)
- Postal code: 8408
- Dialing code: 0513

Lippenhuizen (West Frisian: Lippenhuzen) is a village in the municipality of Opsterland in the east of Friesland, the Netherlands. It had a population of around 1,330 in January 2017.

== History ==
The village was first mentioned in 1315 as Luppingahusum, and means houses of the Luppinga family. Lippenhuizen developed on a sandy ridge in a heath and moorland region. In 1718, the Opsterlandse Compagnonsvaart was extended to near the church for the excavation of peat.

The Dutch Reformed church dates from 1743. In 1860, a tower was added to the church. Lippenhuizen was home to 1,002 people in 1840.

From 1884 to 1947 Lippenhuizen had a stop on the tram line Heerenveen - Drachten.

== Notable people ==
- Reinoudina de Goeje (1833–1893), author of children's and young adult literature
- Evert Zandstra (1897–1974), novelist
- Klaas Bouma (1914–1944), painter
- Foppe de Haan (born 1943), football coach

== Gallery ==
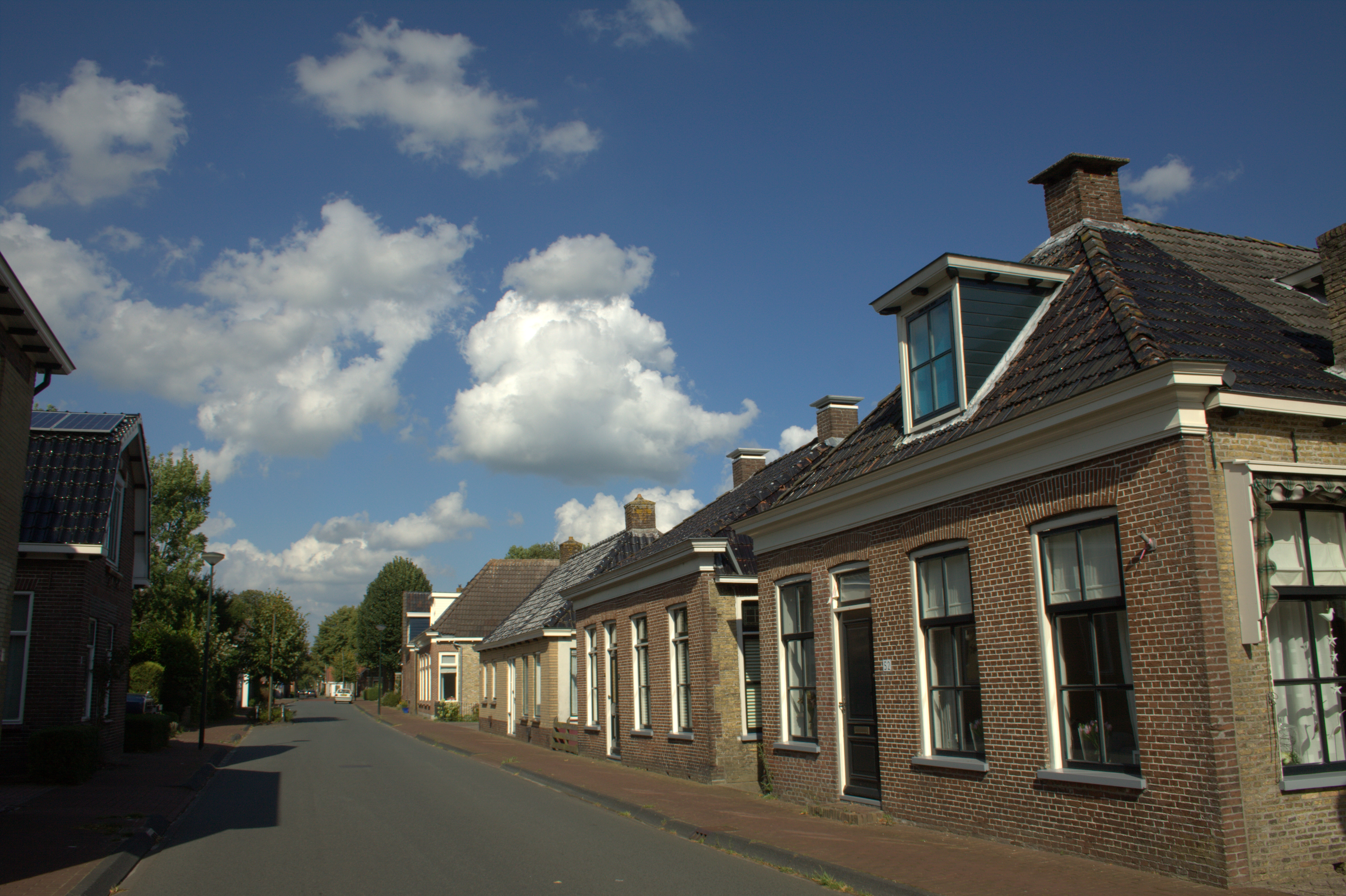
Street view

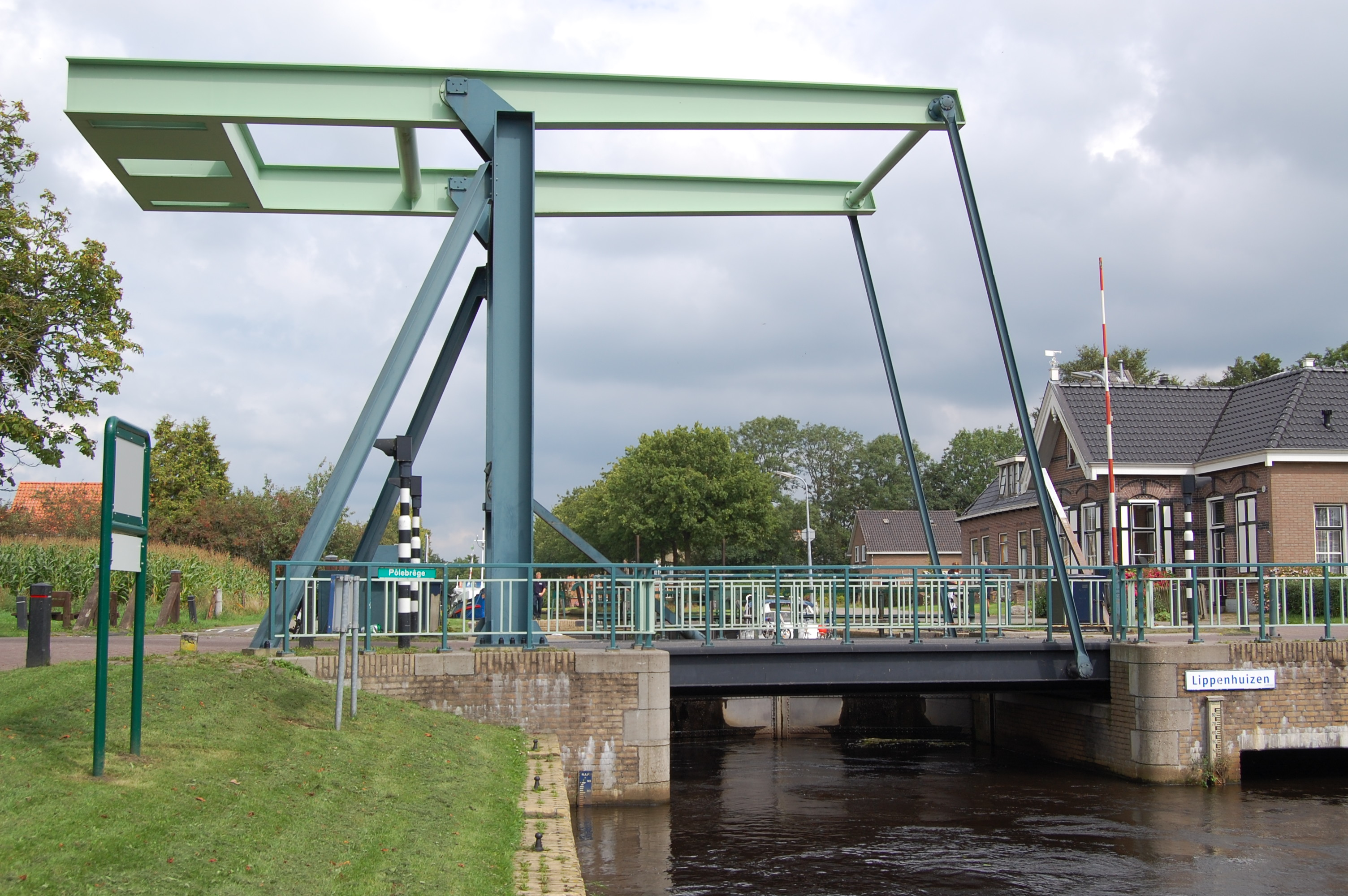
A bridge in Lippenhuizen

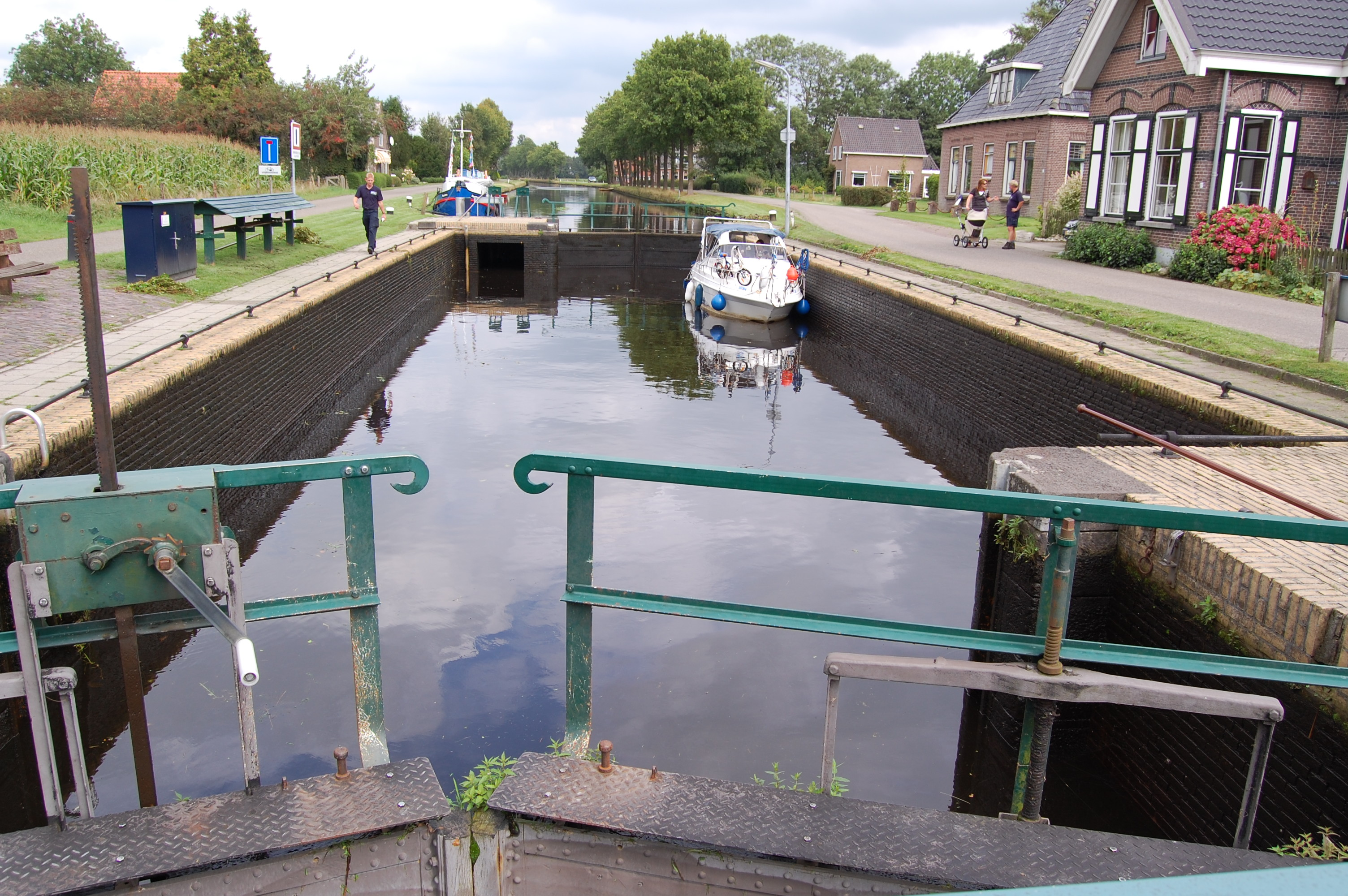
The sluice in Lippehuizen

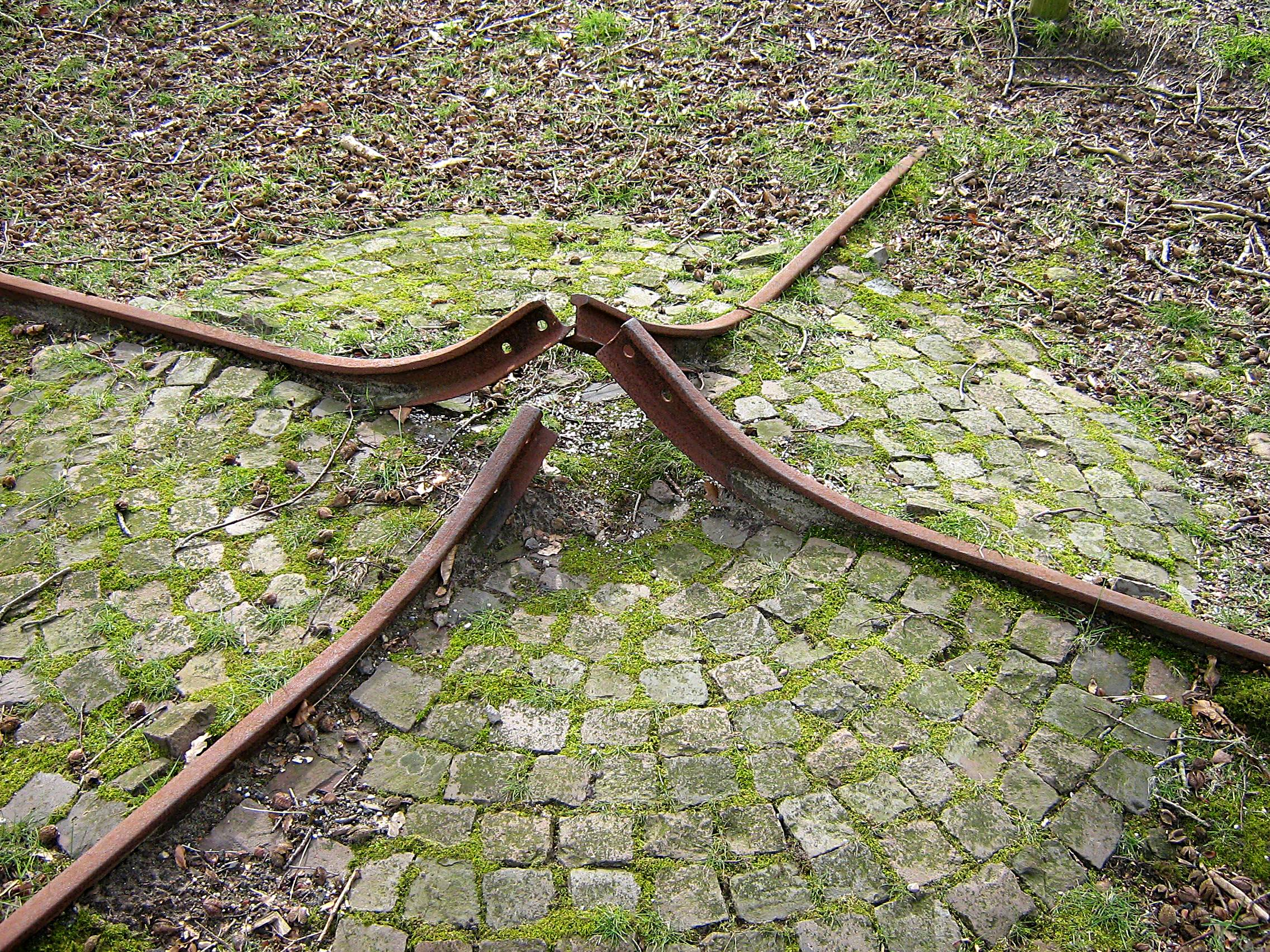
Tram accident monument
