= 2015–16 Korfbal League =

Korfbal League
- Season: 2015–16
- Relegated: Dalto

The 2015–16 Korfbal League season is the 10th season of the Korfbal League since its establishment in 2005. PKC are the defending champions. At the end of the season Dalto relegated direct. AW.DTV went to the play-off to stay in.

== Teams ==
A total of 10 teams will be taking part in the league: The best eight teams from the 2014-15 season, one direct promotion from the Hoofdklasse and one promotion/relegation play-off winner.

Locatie of teams in 2015-16 Korfbal League

Club	Province	Location	Position in 2014-15
Blauw-Wit	North Holland	Amsterdam	4th
Dalto	(Utrecht (province)) Utrecht	Driebergen	8th
DVO	Gelderland	Bennekom	6th
Fortuna	South Holland	Delft	5th
AW.DTV	North Holland	Amsterdam	Winner Hoofklasse play-off
KZ	North Holland	Koog aan de Zaan	3rd
LDODK	Friesland	Gorredijk	7th
DOS'46	Drenthe	Nijeveen	Winner promotion/relegation play-off
PKC	South Holland	Papendrecht	1st
TOP	South Holland	Sassenheim	2nd

== Regular Season Table ==
Pos	Team	Pld	W	D	L	GF	GA	GD	Pts	Play-offs or relegation
1	PKC	18	16	2	0	556	384	+172	34	Final Stages
2	TOP	18	15	0	3	508	420	+88	30	Final Stages
3	Blauw-Wit	18	10	2	6	504	453	+51	22	Final Stages
4	KZ	18	9	0	9	467	453	+14	18	Final Stages
5	Fortuna	18	8	2	8	426	445	−19	18	
6	LDODK	18	7	0	11	422	454	−32	14	
7	DOS'46	18	6	1	11	409	441	−32	13	
8	DVO	18	6	0	12	431	499	−68	12	
9	AW.DTV	18	5	2	11	430	517	−87	12	promotion / relegation play-off
10	Dalto	18	3	1	14	413	500	−87	7	Relegation to Hoofdklasse

Updated to match(es) played on 1 April 2016. Source: KNKV

== Final Stages ==
Semi-finals
2 April 2016 -
(North Holland) Koog Zaandijk	18
(South Holland) PKC	22
2 April 2016 -
(North Holland) Blauw-Wit	27
(South Holland) TOP	26

Final
16 April 2016 -
(South Holland) PKC	22
(South Holland) TOP	24
Third place
16 April 2016 -
(North Holland) Koog Zaandijk
(North Holland) Blauw-Wit
