= Wim Scholtmeijer =

Dutch korfball player

Personal information
- Born: 4 September 1982 (age 43) Gieten, Netherlands
- Height: 1.92 m (6 ft 3 1/2 in)

Sport
- Country: Netherlands national team
- Sport: Korfball
- League: Korfbal League
- Club: Fortuna; PKC; TOP
- Retired: 2011
- Now coaching: Netherlands (2014–2020); PKC (2020–present)
Medal record
Mixed korfball
Representing Netherlands
World Games
Gold medal – first place	World Games 2005	Team
Korfball World Championship
Gold medal – first place	2007 Korfball World Championship	Team
Gold medal – first place	2003 Korfball World Championship	Team
European Korfball Championship
Gold medal – first place	2006 European Korfball Championship	Team

Wim Scholtmeijer (born 1982) is a former Dutch korfball player and former coach of TeamNL Korfball, the Dutch national korfball team. Since 2020 has been the headcoach of PKC.

As a player Scholtmeijer won four Dutch national championships and two European championships. As the Dutch national team headcoach he won six gold medals.

Scholtmeijer father, Jantinus Scholtmeijer, was also a korfball player and coached the Polish and Australian national team.

== Playing career ==
Scholmeijer began playing korfball at the age of 5 at ASKO (Assen). In 2000, at the age of 18 he started university in Groningen. He then joined Nic. as this was a successful team in Groningen. Here he played for two seasons.

In 2002 he joined Fortuna to team up with Joost Preuninger and Barry Schep. In the same off-season Fortuna also acquired new headcoach Hans Heemskerk and the team revitalized. In his first season with Fortuna, he won the Dutch national indoor championship. His second season was even better, when Fortuna first won the European indoor championship and repeated the Dutch national indoor championship. In his third season Fortuna repeated the European indoor championship, but could not repeat a trip to the Dutch indoor finals.

Scholmeijer then joined PKC in 2005.

In 2005, a new league was introduced; the Korfbal League and at the start of season 2005–2006, Scholtmeijer declared himself as the first ever korfball professional. In this first season with PKC, PKC ended as number 1 in the regular competition. PKC entered the play-off versus the number four seed, Dalto. PKC lost the play-off and therefore missed the final. However, in the same season in the outdoor competition PKC won the play-off versus Dalto and saw itself being placed in the final. In this final, PKC won with 16-13 from AKC Blauw-Wit.

In season 2006–2007 Scholtmeijer and PKC joined DOS'46 in the Korfbal League final. In this final, DOS'46 won by just 1 point; 17-16. The same happened in the outdoor final, where both PKC and DOS'46 were in the final. In this final, DOS'46 won with 17-13.

In season 2007–2008 PKC did not place itself for the Korfbal League final. In the outdoor competition PKC lost in the final to Dalto. After this season Scholtmeijer decided to join another team; KV TOP.

At TOP, his new team, Scholtmeijer was reunited with coach Hans Heemskerk. In season 2008–2009 and 2009–2010 TOP did not manage to reach the play-offs in either the indoor or outdoor competition.

Season 2010–2011 was Scholmeijer's final season as a player and he closed off his career with a bang. In this season TOP won the indoor and outdoor final.

== Honours ==
- Dutch champion indoor, 3x (2003, 2004 and 2011)
- Dutch champion outdoor, 1x (2011)
- Europacup champion, 2x (2004, 2005)

== Dutch national team ==
Scholtmeijer was selected in 2003 to the national korfball team by headcoach Jan Sjouke van den Bos. Scholtmeijer participated in four international tournaments, winning gold at all appearances. Scholtmeijer won the individual award of Best Player of the Tournament at the 2003 World Championship.

== Coaching career ==
=== Dutch national team ===
In 2014, Scholtmeijer replaced Jan Sjouke van den Bos as the head coach of the Dutch national korfball team. In this role he won gold medals at six international tournaments. In 2020, after six years in service, Scholtmeijer was replaced by Jan Niebeek.

=== PKC ===
In 2020 Scholtmeijer joined his former teammate Jennifer Tromp to be the new coaching staff for PKC.
