= Korfbal League & Hoofdklasse promotion/relegation play-off =

Promotion / relegation play-off
- Country: Netherlands
- Number of clubs: 2
- Current: 2015–16

The Korfbal League & Hoofdklasse promotion/relegation play-off has been organized every year since the founding in 2005 of the Korfbal League. In the match the number 9 of the Korfbal League meets the loser of the Hoofdklasse promotion final. The winner gains a spot in next seasons Korfbal League.

== Play-off Winners and Losers ==
Season	Winner	Loser
2005–06	Nic.	KVS
2006–07	Koog Zaandijk	SKF
2007–08	AKC	Die Haghe
2008–09	Blauw-Wit	KVS
2009–10	DVO	OVVO
2010–11	DVO	OVVO
2011–12	DVO	OVVO
2012–13	Nic.	DOS'46
2013–14	KVS	KCC
2014–15	DOS'46	OVVO
2015–16		
