= 2024 in korfball =

This article lists the main korfball events and their results for 2024. This includes international championships and league competitions.

== Beach korfball ==
=== World championships ===
- April 26–28: 2024 World Beach Korfball Championship in (Thailand) Pattaya

== Korfball ==
=== International competitions ===
- March 1 – 5: 2024 IKF Asia U19, U16 & U14 Korfball4 Championship in (Malaysia) Kuala Lumpur
- March 29 – 31: 2024 IKF U19 (Open) European Korfball Championship in (Catalonia) Vilanova i la Geltrú
- June 29 – 30: 2024 U17 Korfball World Cup in (Netherlands) Eindhoven
- July 6 – 13: 2024 IKF U21 World Korfball Championship in (Turkey) Kemer
- October 14 - 19: European Korfball Championship B-Division in (Turkey) Kemer
- October 28 - November 2: European Korfball Championship A-Division in (Catalonia) Calonge i Sant Antoni

=== Club competitions ===
- January 18 – 20: 2024 IKF Korfball Champions League Satellite Final in (Turkey) Antalya
  - Winners: (Germany) Schweriner KC
- January 26 – 28: 2024 IKF Korfball Champions League Challenger Final in (Netherlands) Papendrecht
  - Winners: (Czech Republic) KK Brno
- February 7 – 10: 2024 IKF Korfball Champions League Final in (Netherlands) Papendrecht
  - Winners: (Netherlands) PKC/Vertom

=== Domestic league seasons ===
| Nation | League | Champion | Second place | Title | Last honour |
|---|---|---|---|---|---|
| Belgium | 2023–24 Topkorfballeague indoor | | | | |
| Catalonia | 2023–24 Lliga Nacional de Korfbal de 1a Divisió | | | | |
| Netherlands | 2023-24 Kenonz Korfbal League | PKC/Vertom | DVO/Transus | | |
