= Hoofdklasse (korfball) =

- Country: Netherlands
- Number of clubs: 16
- Level on pyramid: 3
- Promotion to: Korfbal League 2
- Relegation to: Overgangsklasse
- Current champions: DSC (2015/16)
- Current: 2015-16 Hoofdklasse

The Hoofdklasse is the third highest echelon of indoor korfball in the Netherlands. The division is split up in two parallel groups called Hoofdklasse A and Hoofdklasse B.

== Champions ==
| Season | Champions | Runners-up |
|---|---|---|
| 2005-06 | Koog Zaandijk | KVS |
| 2006-07 | KVS | SKF |
| 2007-08 | TOP | AKC |
| 2008-09 | OVVO | KVS |
| 2009-10 | KVS | DVO |
| 2010-11 | DeetosSnel | OVVO |
| 2011-12 | LDODK | OVVO |
| 2012-13 | OVVO | DOS'46 |
| 2013-14 | KVS | KCC |
| 2014-15 | AW.DTV | DOS'46 |
| 2015-16 | DSC | TOP |
