= Mick Snel =

Dutch korfball player

Personal information
- Born: 13 April 1993 (age 33) Amsterdam, Netherlands
- Height: 1.94 m (6 ft 4 1/2 in)

Sport
- Country: Netherlands national team
- Sport: Korfball
- League: Korfbal League
- Club: KV TOP; Fortuna
Medal record
Mixed korfball
Representing Netherlands
World Games
Gold medal – first place	2013 Cali	Team
Korfball World Championship
Gold medal – first place	2011 Shaoxin	Team

Mick Snel (born 13 April 1993) is a Dutch korfball player. He currently plays for TOP and made his entry at the Dutch national team at the 2011 Korfball World Championship where he played 5 matches.

In his inaugural 2010–11 season of the Dutch Korfballeague his team TOP became champions and he scored 137 goals making him number 2 on the topscorer list.

== Honours ==
- Champion Dutch Korfballeague 2010–11, 2013–14, 2015–16, 2016–17 and 2017–18 with TOP
- World champion with the Dutch national team 2011 and 2015
- European champion with the Dutch national team 2014 and 2016
