= Unitas =

Unitas may refer to:

== Places ==
- 306 Unitas, a main belt asteroid
- Housing complex Unitas, an apartment complex from 1931 in Bratislava, Slovakia
- Johnny Unitas Stadium, Towson, Maryland, USA; a multipurpose stadium

== People ==
- Johnny Unitas (1933-2002), U.S. professional American football player
- Pong Unitas, American football player for the NFL's Washington Senators
- Tony Unitas (1924–1991), Canadian boxer

== Awards, decorations, prizes ==
- Unitas Award (Johnny Unitas Golden Arm Award) in American college football for upperclassmen quarterbacks
- Unitas Medal, a South African award for military service during 1994, when South Africa reintegrated

== Groups, organizations ==
- The Catholic League, an Anglo-Catholic devotional society
- Unitas Foundation (formerly: Foundation for the Investigation of Communist Crimes)
- Unitas Capital, a private equity firm, formerly known as CCMP Capital Asia
- Unitas Sports Club, Helsinki, Finland
- Unitas '30, Etten Leur, Netherlands; a soccer team founded in 1930
- GVV Unitas (Gorinchemse Voetbalvereniging Unitas), Gorinchem, Netherlands; a soccer team
- CKV Unitas (Christelijke Korfbal Vereniging Unitas), Harderwijk, Netherlands; a korfball team

== Transport and vehicular ==
- German trawler V 5116 Unitas 1, the German ship Unitas 1, requisitioned for service as a Vorpostenboot auxiliary warship in WW2
- German trawler V 1701 Unitas 2, the German ship Unitas 2, requisitioned for service as a Vorpostenboot auxiliary warship in WW2
- German trawler V 1702 Unitas 3, the German ship Unitas 3, requisitioned for service as a Vorpostenboot auxiliary warship in WW2
- SS Empire Unitas IV, the German ship Unitas 4, seized for use as an Empire Ship by the British in WW2
- SS Empire Unitas V, the German ship Unitas 5, seized for use as an Empire Ship by the British in WW2
- German trawler V 1510 Unitas 6, the German ship Unitas 6, requisitioned for service as a Vorpostenboot auxiliary warship in WW2
- German trawler V 1511 Unitas 7, the German ship Unitas 7, requisitioned for service as a Vorpostenboot auxiliary warship in WW2
- SS Empire Unitas VIII, the German ship Unitas 8, seized for use as an Empire Ship by the British in WW2
- German trawler V 1925 Unitas 9, the German ship Unitas 9, requisitioned for service as a Vorpostenboot auxiliary warship in WW2
- SS Empire Unitas X, the German ship Unitas 10, seized for use as an Empire Ship by the British in WW2

== Other uses ==
- UNITAS, a multi-lateral naval exercise in South and Central America
- Humani generis unitas, a planned encyclical of Pope Pius XI before his death on February 10, 1939, which condemned antisemitism, racism and the persecution of Jews.
- Unitas (gastropod), a genus of molluscs in the family Cancellariidae

== See also ==
- Unita (disambiguation)
