= CKV Unitas =

- Leagues: Korfbal League (indoor), Ereklasse(outdoor)
- Founded: 19 October 1961; 63 years ago
- Arena: De Sypel
- Location: Harderwijk, Netherlands
- President: (Netherlands) Jan Hop
- Head coach: (Netherlands) Marc Houtman

CKV Unitas (Christelijke Korfbal Vereniging Unitas) is a Dutch korfball club located in Harderwijk, Netherlands. De club name Unitas stands for unity. The team plays in orange and black tenue.

== History ==
In the 60s there was no korfball being played in the area of Harderwijk. During the first years after the club has been established it did not have its own clubhouse and locker rooms and had to improvise in order to be able to actually complete the competition. The club made extensive use of school korfball to recruit new members. This way, the youth section kept growing.

Since 1971 the club has its own clubhouse, next to the Slingerbos.

For the first time in the club's history, Unitas reached the Hoofdklasse final in the indoor competition in the 2021–2022 season. Unitas won the final against HKC, earning promotion to the Korfbal League, the highest Dutch indoor korfball competition.

In their first season in the Korfbal League, 2022-23, the team was relegated back to the Korfbal League 2.

During the 2023-24 Korfbal League 2 season, Unitas has again achieved promotion to the Korfbal League, meaning they will participate in the highest Dutch korfball competition for the second time in the 2024-25 season.
