= 2015–16 Hoofdklasse (Korfball) =

Hoofdklasse
- Season: 2015–16
- Promoted: DSC
- Relegated: Groen Geel; GKV; Ons Eibernest; SKF

The 2015-16 Hoofdklasse season is split up in two divisions of 8 teams: Hoofdklasse A and Hoofdklasse B. On 26 March 2016 DSC managed promotion by winning the play-off of the 2015-16 season against TOP. This meant TOP had to meet AW.DTV (number 9 of the Korfbal League) in the promotion / relegation play-off.

== Teams ==
A total of 10 teams will be taking part in the league: The best eight teams from the 2014-15 season, one direct promotion from the Hoofdklasse and one promotion/relegation play-off winner.

Location of teams in 2015-16 Hoofdklasse

=== Hoofdklasse A ===
| Club | Province | Location | Position in 2014-15 |
|---|---|---|---|
| Avanti | South Holland | Pijnacker | |
| DeetosSnel | South Holland | Dordrecht | |
| DSC | North Brabant | Eindhoven | |
| GKV | South Holland | Gorinchem | |
| Groen Geel | North Holland | Wormer | |
| KVS | South Holland | Scheveningen | |
| Oranje Wit | South Holland | Dordrecht | |
| TOP | Zeeland | Arnemuiden | |

=== Hoofdklasse B ===
| Club | Province | Location | Position in 2014-15 |
|---|---|---|---|
| Ons Eibernest | South Holland | The Hague | |
| KCC | South Holland | Capelle aan den IJssel | |
| Nic. | (Groningen (province)) Groningen | Groningen | |
| OVVO | (Utrecht (province)) Utrecht | Maarssen | |
| Rohda | North Holland | Amsterdam | |
| SCO | Friesland | Oldeholtpade | |
| SKF | (Utrecht (province)) Utrecht | Veenendaal | |
| Wageningen | Gelderland | Wageningen | |

== Regular season table ==
=== Hoofdklasse A ===
| Pos | Team | Pld | W | D | L | GF | GA | GD | Pts | Play-offs or relegation |
|---|---|---|---|---|---|---|---|---|---|---|
| 1 | TOP | 14 | 12 | 0 | 2 | 358 | 315 | +43 | 24 | Promotion play-offs |
| 2 | DSC | 14 | 11 | 0 | 3 | 323 | 281 | +42 | 22 | Promotion play-offs |
| 3 | DeetosSnel | 14 | 10 | 1 | 3 | 367 | 331 | +36 | 21 | |
| 4 | Avanti | 14 | 7 | 1 | 6 | 341 | 314 | +27 | 15 | |
| 5 | KVS | 14 | 4 | 1 | 9 | 306 | 320 | −14 | 9 | |
| 6 | Oranje Wit | 14 | 4 | 0 | 10 | 299 | 351 | −52 | 8 | |
| 7 | Groen Geel | 14 | 3 | 1 | 10 | 291 | 334 | −43 | 7 | Relegation |
| 8 | GKV | 14 | 2 | 2 | 10 | 327 | 366 | −39 | 6 | Relegation |

Updated to match(es) played on 1 April 2016. Source: KNKV

=== Hoofdklasse B ===
| Pos | Team | Pld | W | D | L | GF | GA | GD | Pts | Play-offs or relegation |
|---|---|---|---|---|---|---|---|---|---|---|
| 1 | Wageningen | 14 | 10 | 1 | 3 | 378 | 320 | +58 | 21 | Promotion play-offs |
| 2 | KCC | 14 | 8 | 1 | 5 | 342 | 324 | +18 | 17 | Promotion play-offs |
| 3 | OVVO | 14 | 8 | 0 | 6 | 338 | 309 | +29 | 16 | |
| 4 | Rohda | 14 | 7 | 1 | 6 | 334 | 325 | +9 | 15 | |
| 5 | Nic. | 14 | 7 | 0 | 7 | 336 | 324 | +12 | 14 | |
| 6 | SCO | 14 | 5 | 2 | 7 | 336 | 357 | −21 | 12 | |
| 7 | Ons Eibernest | 14 | 5 | 1 | 8 | 319 | 346 | −27 | 11 | Relegation |
| 8 | SKF | 14 | 3 | 0 | 11 | 301 | 379 | −78 | 6 | Relegation |

Updated to match(es) played on 1 April 2016. Source: KNKV

== Promotion play-off ==
Round 1
(South Holland) KCC | 25 12 16
(Zeeland) TOP | 18 21 17
(North Brabant) DSC | 20 23
(Gelderland) Wageningen | 19 22

Round 2
26 March 2016 - PKC-hal
(Zeeland) TOP | 13
(North Brabant) DSC | 21
