= Fortuna Delft =

Fortuna
- Leagues: Korfbal League
- Founded: 3 February 1957; 68 years ago
- Arena: Fortuna-Hal
- Location: Delft, Netherlands
- President: Ed Hom
- Head coach: Joost Preuninger and Damien Folkerts

Fortuna (Korfbalvereniging Fortuna) is a Dutch korfball club located in Delft, Netherlands. The club was founded on 3 February 1957 and they play their home games in the Fortuna-Hal. The team plays in white/red vertically striped shirts and black shorts / skirts.

== History ==
=== General history ===
Fortuna was founded on 3 February 1957 by Chris Bezuyen, Ria Boer, Jan Bonthuis, Ria Rongen, Arie Rongen en Ineke Rosier. The club expanded rapidly, mainly by korfbal played at elementary schools. By that time, Fortuna was already the fourth korfball club in Delft. However Fortuna is the youngest club of the city, it always had the highest ambitions.

Fortuna rapidly turned out to be a club playing on the highest national levels and for the last 30 years it has acted on the Hoofdklasse and Korfbal League, with the exception of 1 season.

Fortuna also won the Dutch national championships a few times; 4 times indoors and 2 times outdoors.

Over de last years, the full name of the club changed due to new partnerships with their main sponsor. In 2004 the name became Fortuna/Tempus. In 2009 the name changed to Fortuna/MHIR. In 2014 the name changed to Fortuna/MyCollections and the last name change came in 2015 when it changed into Fortuna/Delta Logistiek.

Fortuna own its own outdoor fields and indoor hall.

=== Successes ===
National Champion indoor (5 times)
1983, 1990, 2003, 2004, 2019

National Champion outdoor (2 times)
1985, 1986

Europacup (3 times)
2004, 2005, 2020

=== FKS ===
Every year Fortuna hosts its own FKS tournament. This 2 days annual tournament is held in preparation of the upcoming Korfbal League season. Four Korfbal League teams compete for the FKS title.

The current FKS champion is PKC/SWK Groep.

Year	Champion	Final score	Runner-up	3rd Place	4th Place
FKS 2017	PKC / SWKGroep	19-29	Fortuna/Delta Logistiek	AKC Blauw-Wit	Avanti
FKS 2016	PKC / SWKGroep	26-23	AKC Blauw-Wit	Fortuna/Delta Logistiek	DOS'46
FKS 2015	PKC / SWKGroep	22-17	DOS'46	Fortuna/Delta Logistiek	Dalto
FKS 2014	PKC / SWKGroep	22-17	Fortuna/MyCollections	Top/Quoratio	KVS/Maritiem
FKS 2013	PKC / Hagero	18-22	Top / Justlease.nl	DVO	Fortuna
FKS 2012	Fortuna/MHIR	25-13	Top / Wereldtickets.nl	Deetos	DVO
FKS 2011	PKC / Hagero	27-16	DeetosSnel/Volhuis	Fortuna/MHIR	Top / Wereldtickets.nl
FKS 2010	KVS	17-15	Top / Wereldtickets.nl	Koog Zaandijk	Fortuna/MHIR
FKS 2009	Top / Wereldtickets.nl	19-18	Dalto	Koog Zaandijk	Fortuna/MHIR
FKS 2008	Top / Wereldtickets.nl	20-19	Dalto	Fortuna/MHIR	Koog Zaandijk
FKS 2007	Fortuna/MHIR	23-18	DOS'46	Dalto	KVS
FKS 2006	PKC / Cafe Bar	22-13	Fortuna/Tempus	Dalto	KVS
FKS 2005	PKC / Cafe Bar	24-19	Fortuna/Tempus	DOS'46	KV Die Haghe
FKS 2004	DOS'46	17-7	De Meervogels	Fortuna/Tempus	KV Die Haghe
FKS 2003	KV Die Haghe	18-15	Fortuna/Tempus	De Meervogels	KVS
FKS 2002	no champion*	-	-	-	-
FKS 2001	Fortuna/Tempus	18-15	Blauw Wit	De Meervogels	KVS
FKS 2000	PKC	14-13	KV Die Haghe	Fortuna	Deetos
FKS 1999	Oost Arnhem	21-26	DOS'46	Fortuna	KV Die Haghe
FKS 1998	KV Die Haghe	13-12	Deetos	Fortuna	DOS'46

- = final match got cancelled due to moist issues in the hall.

=== Miscellaneous awards ===
Fortuna frequently participates in tournaments. By doing this, the club won several awards. Here a short overview

Haagse Korfbaldagen (12 time champion)

This tournament held in The Hague has been around since 1985 and features clubs from The Hague area. This tournament is held before the Korfbal League season starts. Fortuna won this tournament in 1990, 1994, 1998, 1999, 2002, 2003, 2004, 2005, 2006, 2007, 2010 en 2011. However, after 2011 Fortuna decided no longer to participate in this tournament any more, due to the busy preparation schedule in September/October.

Korfbal Challenge (3 time champion)

The Korfbal Challenge is an international tournament which is being held in Rotterdam between Christmas and New Years Day. Only 2 Korfbal League clubs are granted access to this tournament; only the 2 finalists of the Korfbal League Finals from that year. Besides that, this tournament features teams from other countries, such as Belgium, Taiwan, Spain or Czech Republic.

The Korfbal Challenge is besides being a high class tournament also a moment where the KNKV tries out possible new rules of the game. Some experiments are being rejected quickly, but also some experiments are turned into new international rules. This way, the game tries to keep up and lift dynamics or speed of the game.

Fortuna has won this tournament 3 times, in 2003, 2004 and 2012.

Annual National Individual KNKV Awards

Ard Korporaal & Damien Folkerts : 'Coach of the Year' for season 2017-2018

Daan Preuninger: 'Best Player <21' for season 2015-2016

Barry Schep: 'Player of the Year' for season 2012-2013

Mirjam Maltha: 'Player of the Year' for season 2012-2013

Barry Schep: 'Player of the Year' for season 2011-2012

Barry Schep: 'Player of the Year' for season 2010-2011

Heleen van der Wilt: 'Player of the Year' for season 2003-2004

Barbara Schouls: 'Talent of the Year' for season 2002-2003

Hans Heemskerk: 'Coach of the Year' for season 2002-2003

Marloes Preuninger: 'Player of the Year' for season 2002-2003

Barry Schep: 'Talent of the Year' for season 2000-2001

Hans Heemskerk: 'Player of the Year' for season 1983-1984

== Current squad ==
Squad for the 2018-19 season - Updated: October 2018

Headcoaches: Joost Preuninger and Damien Folkerts

Women

- (Netherlands) Manon Brand
- (Netherlands) Mirthe van Staalduinen
- (Netherlands) Eva van der Zon
- (Netherlands) Jessica Lokhorst
- (Netherlands) Sanne Alsem
- (Netherlands) Mirjam Maltha
- (Netherlands) Fleur Hoek
- (Netherlands) Eline Entken
- (Netherlands) Michelle van Geffen
- (Netherlands) Claire van Oosten
- (Netherlands) Roos van Groen

Men

- (Netherlands) Daan Preuninger
- (Netherlands) Merijn Sevenhuysen
- (Netherlands) Sijmen van den Bergh
- (Netherlands) Jord Bezemer
- (Netherlands) Sven Bezemer
- (Netherlands) Kaj Esser
- (Netherlands) Tim Heemskerk
- (Netherlands) Nik van der Steen
- (Netherlands) Thomas Reijgersberg
- (Netherlands) Marcel Segaar
- (Netherlands) Joren van Nieuwenhuyzen
- (Netherlands) Jordi Kouwenhoven
