= 2025 IKF U17 Korfball World Cup =

Sporting event in the Netherlands

Tournament details
- Host country: Netherlands
- Dates: 28–29 June 2025
- Teams: 10
- Venue(s): De Vijfkamp, Eindhoven

Final positions
- Champions: Netherlands
- Runners-up: Belgium
- Third place: Chinese Taipei
- Fourth place: Germany

The 25th edition of the U17 Korfball World Cup took place in Eindhoven, Netherlands. It has been organized by the Royal Dutch Korfball Association (KNKV) and patronized by the International Korfball Federation.

Netherlands won the trophy after winning every game during the tournament.

== Group stage ==
Competing countries were divided into two groups of five teams.

=== Group A ===
Pos	Team	Pld	W	L	GF	GA	GD	Pts	
1	Netherlands	4	4	0	137	10	+127	12	Semifinals
2	Germany	4	3	1	56	53	+3	9	Semifinals
3	England	4	2	2	31	62	−31	6	
4	Hong Kong	4	1	3	26	64	−38	3	
5	Catalonia	4	0	4	22	83	−61	0	

Updated to match(es) played on 28 June 2025. Source:

Home \ Away	(Catalonia) CAT	ENG	GER	HKG	NED
Catalonia	—		4–27		3–33
England	11–5	—		12–6	
Germany		17–5	—		2–38
Hong Kong	12–10		6–10	—	
Netherlands		34–3		32–2	—

Updated to match(es) played on 28 June 2025. Source:
Legend: Blue = home team win; Yellow = draw; Red = away team win.

=== Group B ===
Pos	Team	Pld	W	L	GF	GA	GD	Pts	
1	Belgium	4	4	0	68	39	+29	12	Semifinals
2	Chinese Taipei	4	3	1	61	43	+18	9	Semifinals
3	Czech Republic	4	2	2	44	54	−10	6	
4	Portugal	4	1	3	46	45	+1	3	
5	Hungary	4	0	4	34	72	−38	0	

Updated to match(es) played on 28 June 2025. Source:

Home \ Away	BEL	CZE	HUN	POR	TPE
Belgium	—	19–10			16–11
Czech Republic		—	15–9	10–8	
Hungary	9–19		—	9–19	
Portugal	9–14			—	10–13
Chinese Taipei		18–9	19–8		—

Updated to match(es) played on 28 June 2025. Source:
Legend: Blue = home team win; Yellow = draw; Red = away team win.

== Final stages ==
29 June 2025
09:30 (CEST)
Game 21

Hungary	11-9	England
	Report

29 June 2025
09:30 (CEST)
Game 22

Czech Republic	23-4	Catalonia
	Report

29 June 2025
10:25 (CEST)
Semifinal 1

Netherlands	37-12	Chinese Taipei
	Report

29 June 2025
10:25 (CEST)
Game 24

Hong Kong	3-16	Portugal
	Report

29 June 2025
11:35 (CEST)
Semifinal 2

Belgium	22-14	Germany
	Report

29 June 2025
11:35 (CEST)
Game 26

Catalonia	9-21	Hungary
	Report

29 June 2025
12:45 (CEST)
Game 27

Hong Kong	6-23	Czech Republic
	Report

29 June 2025
12:45 (CEST)
Game 28

England	8-15	Portugal
	Report

29 June 2025
14:00 (CEST)
Game 29

England	5-20	Czech Republic
	Report

29 June 2025
14:00 (CEST)
Game 30

Portugal	27-1	Catalonia
	Report

29 June 2025
15:00 (CEST)
3rd place

Chinese Taipei	24-16	Germany
	Report

29 June 2025
15:00 (CEST)
Game 32

Hong Kong	11-14	Hungary
	Report

29 June 2025
16:10 (CEST)
Final

Netherlands	32-15	Belgium
	Report

== Final ranking ==
Rank	Team
1st place, gold medalist(s)	Netherlands
2nd place, silver medalist(s)	Belgium
3rd place, bronze medalist(s)	Chinese Taipei
4	Germany
5	Czech Republic
6	Portugal
7	Hungary
8	England
9	Hong Kong
10	Catalonia

== See also ==
- List of national korfball associations
- IKF World Korfball Ranking
