= 2021 IKF European Korfball B-Championship =

2021 European Korfball B-Championship
Tournament details
- Host country: Poland
- City: Wrocław
- Dates: 4 to 9 October 2021
- Teams: 8
- Venue: 1

The 2021 European Korfball B-Championship was held in Wrocław, Poland from 4 to 9 October 2021. The tournament was originally supposed to be played from 5 to 10 October 2020, but was postponed following COVID-19 measures.

== Qualified teams ==
Team	Method of qualification	Date of qualification
Greece	2020 IKF European Korfball Championship First Round third place	27 January 2020
Ireland	2018 IKF European Korfball B-Championship top-6 finish	17 October 2018
Poland	2018 IKF European Korfball B-Championship top-6 finish	16 October 2018
Scotland	2018 IKF European Korfball B-Championship top-6 finish	19 October 2018
Slovakia	2018 IKF European Korfball B-Championship top-6 finish	17 October 2018
Switzerland	2020 IKF European Korfball Championship First Round top-2 finish	3 November 2019
Turkey	2020 IKF European Korfball Championship First Round top-2 finish	3 November 2019
Wales	2018 IKF European Korfball B-Championship top-6 finish	17 October 2018

1. on 27 January 2020 the Greek Korfball Association announced that as first reserve team (following their third place in the 2020 IKF European Korfball Championship First Round), it had received an official invitation from the International Korfball Federation to participate in the tournament, as one of the eligible teams had withdrawn. Later, it turned out to be France.

== Group stage ==
The eight teams were divided into two groups of four. The first two of each group advanced to the main bracket. The last two of each group continued in the consolidation bracket to determine a full ranking of 9th to 16th place. (As places 1 through 8 are awarded to teams playing in the 2021 IKF European Korfball A-Championship.

=== Group A ===
Pos	Team	Pld	W	OTW	OTL	L	GF	GA	GD	Pts
1	Scotland	3	2	0	0	1	40	35	+5	6
2	Poland	3	2	0	0	1	47	34	+13	6
3	Switzerland	3	1	0	0	2	31	42	−11	3
4	Ireland	3	1	0	0	2	34	41	−7	3

Source: IKF

Team 1	Score	Team 2
Ireland	14-15	Switzerland
Poland	15-18	Scotland
Switzerland	7-10	Scotland
Poland	14-7	Ireland
Scotland	12-13	Ireland
Poland	18-9	Switzerland

=== Group B ===
Pos	Team	Pld	W	OTW	OTL	L	GF	GA	GD	Pts
1	Turkey	3	3	0	0	0	58	25	+33	9
2	Slovakia	3	2	0	0	1	41	40	+1	6
3	Wales	3	1	0	0	2	37	34	+3	3
4	Greece	3	0	0	0	3	17	54	−37	0

Source: IKF

Team 1	Score	Team 2
Wales	17-3	Greece
Slovakia	10-21	Turkey
Turkey	22-6	Greece
Wales	11-16	Slovakia
Turkey	15-9	Wales
Greece	8-15	Slovakia

== Knockout stage ==
=== Main bracket ===
Semifinals
Poland	21
Turkey	11
Scotland	16
Slovakia	21

Finals
Poland	18
Slovakia	15
Third place
Scotland	9
Turkey	17

=== Consolidation bracket ===
Semi-finals
Switzerland	14
Greece	16
Wales	9
Ireland	12

5th place match
Greece	7
Ireland	17
7th place match
Switzerland	12
Wales	7

== Final standing ==
Rank	Team
1st place, gold medalist(s)	Poland
2nd place, silver medalist(s)	Slovakia
3rd place, bronze medalist(s)	Turkey
4	Scotland
5	Ireland
6	Greece
7	Switzerland
8	Wales
