= Royal Belgian Korfball Federation =

Governing body of korfball in Belgium

- Sport: Korfball
- Jurisdiction: Korfball in Belgium
- Abbreviation: KBKB
- Founded: 1921
- Affiliation: International Korfball Federation
- Affiliation date: 1933
- Regional affiliation: Europe
- Location: Deurne
- President: Patrick Risch
- Coach: Detlef Elewaut

Official website
- www.korfbal.be
- (Belgium)

The Royal Belgian Korfball Federation (Dutch: Koninklijke Belgische Korfbalbond, or KBKB) is the governing body of korfball in Belgium. The federation is structured as an Association without lucrative purpose. It organises the main Belgian korfball league and the more recreative leagues, and the Belgian national team.

== History ==
The federation was founded in Antwerp on 28 April 1921 as Belgian Korfball Federation (Dutch: Belgische Korfbalbond, or BKB). In 1953 the federation was allowed to add the title Royal to its official name.

The Royal Belgian Korfball Federation was one of the founders of the International Korfball Federation, with the Dutch Federation, on 11 June 1933.

== Competitions ==
On a yearly basis, the federation organizes three top tier domestic competitions:

- Topkorfballeague indoor
- Topkorfballeague outdoor
- Belgian Cup (outdoor)
