= 2015–16 Korfbal League & Hoofdklasse promotion/relegation play-off =

Promotion / Relegation play-off
- Season: 2015–16

The 2015–16 Korfbal League & Hoofdklasse promotion/relegation play-off was played between AW.DTV (number 9 of the Korfbal League) and TOP (the loser of the Hoofdklasse promotion final). The first match in the play-off was played at the home accommodation of AW.DTV called Gaasperdam. After a 13-10 half-time score the home team won 24-21.

== Teams ==
A total of 2 teams will be taking part in the play-off.

Location of teams in promotion / relegation play-off

Club	Province	Location	Position in 2014-15
AW.DTV	North Holland	Amsterdam	9th Korfbal League
TOP	Zeeland	Arnemuiden	Loser Hoofdklasse final

== Play-off ==
Final
26 March 2016 -
(North Holland) AW.DTV	24
(Zeeland) TOP	21
