= Jacobus Anthonie Meessen =

Dutch photographer (1836–1885)

- Born: 5 December 1836; Utrecht, Netherlands
- Died: 14 November 1885 (aged 48); Opsterland, Netherlands
- Known for: Photography

Jacobus Anthonie Meessen (Dutch pronunciation: [jaːˈkoːbʏs ˈɑntoːni ˈmeːsə(n)]; 5 December 1836 – 14 November 1885) was a Dutch photographer who took more than 250 portraits and landscapes of the Dutch East Indies (now Indonesia) between 1864 and 1870. Born to a carpenter in Utrecht, Meessen worked in that trade in the Indies before marrying in the Netherlands in the early 1860s. He returned to the colony in 1864, intent on documenting its land and people. He worked mostly in the capital of Batavia (now Jakarta), Java, and Padang, Sumatra; he also photographed Bangka, Belitung, Borneo, and Nias.

When Meessen returned to the Netherlands in 1870, he established a short-lived partnership with Abraham Vermeulen and began disseminating his photographs. Selected images were given to King William III in an elaborately decorated album in 1871, while more were published by De Bussy in 1875 and exhibited in Paris and Amsterdam. In his final years, Meessen worked predominantly as an architect. Collections of his albumen prints, some of which were hand-tinted or annotated, are held in four institutions in the Netherlands.

== Biography ==
Meessen was born in Utrecht, the Netherlands, on 5 December 1836 to the carpenter Hermanus Johannes Meessen and his wife Megteld Legué. In 1858, Meessen first went to Batavia (now Jakarta), the capital of the Dutch colony in the East Indies, where he worked as a carpenter. By 1860 he was living in the Purbalingga area. Two years later he returned to the Netherlands, where he served as a special inspector for the Bureau voor den Waterstaat. (Note: Original: "buitengewoon opzigter van den waterstaat") On 11 December 1862, he wed Johanna Alida (Jansje) Steenbeek in Utrecht, and the couple settled in that city for the next two years. Their marriage produced three daughters, born in 1865, 1866, and 1869. The first, Antonia, died in infancy.

=== Photography ===
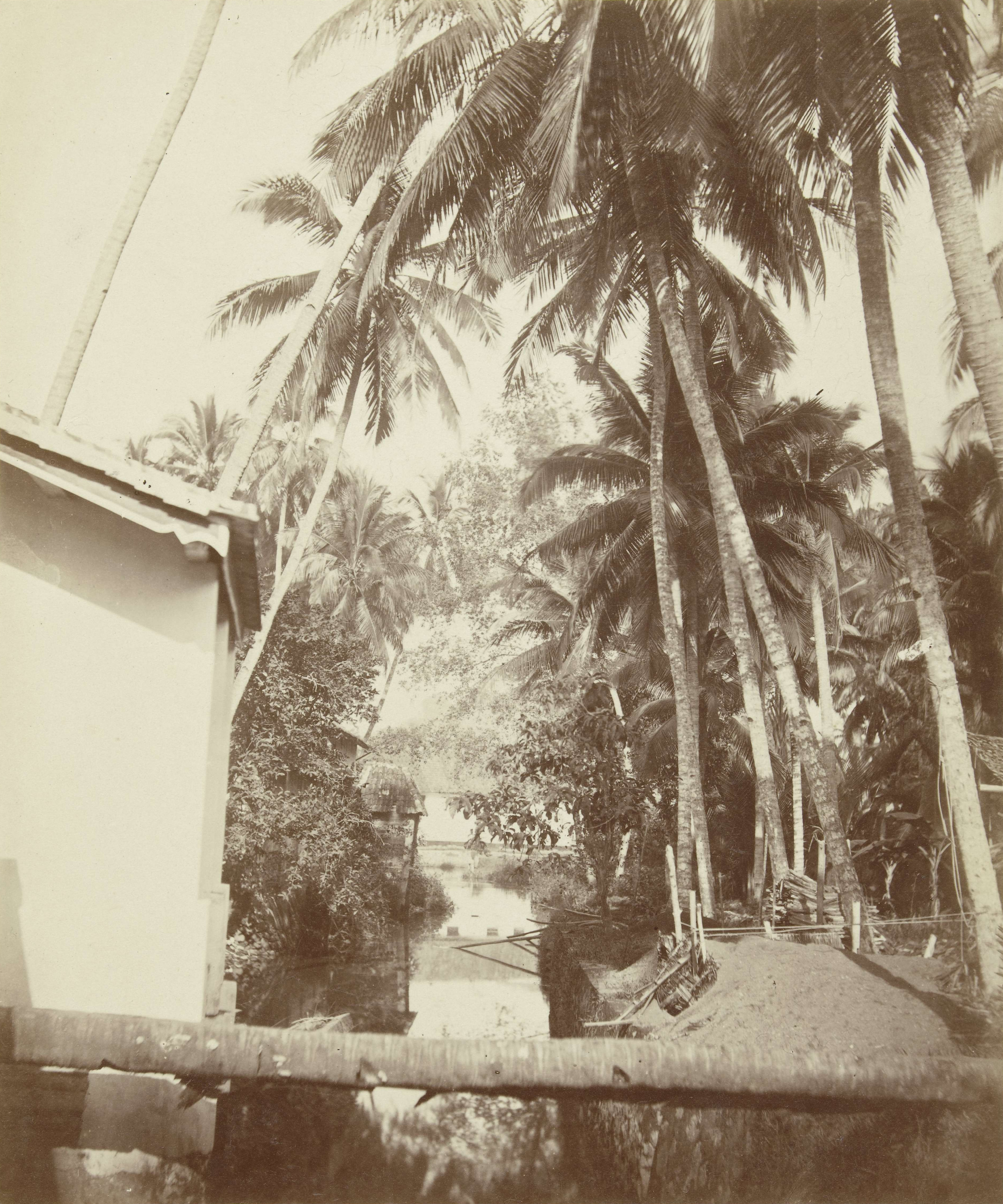
Kali Mati, Padang, Sumatra, photographed by Meessen

Meessen and his wife departed for the Indies in 1864, first arriving in Batavia, where Meessen established a photo studio in early 1867. He was one of the few photographers active in the Indies in the 1860s; contemporaries included Isidore van Kinsbergen, Adolph Schaefer, and the commercial firm of Woodbury and Page (operated by Walter B. Woodbury and James Page). Meessen hoped to eventually take images of the Indies' various lands and people. From May to August, he was in Sumatra, first in Padang and later in the Minang Highlands. There he offered various photographic services, including double and family portraits. When he returned to Batavia in September, he opened another studio, offering portraits and selling prints of landscapes.

Three months later Jacobus and Johanna sold their belongings and moved back to Padang, where the Meessens established a photography studio. In their biography of the photographer, Mattie Boom and Steven Wachlin suggest that this was likely a commercial necessity, as Meessen may have been unable to compete with the Batavia-based Woodbury and Page. By November 1868 Jacobus was advertising his first album, titled Sumatra's Westkust (Sumatra's West Coast). Bound in Moroccan leather, the album contained more than sixty landscapes of Padang and surrounding cities (including Padang Panjang and Fort de Kock). (Note: One advertisement can be accessed at Sumatra-courant 1868, Sumatra.) By June 1869, his studio at the Sumatra Hotel was offering workshops, as well as images from northern Sumatra and Nias.

Altogether, Meessen's photographic ventures in the Indies – and the resulting albums – cost some 34,000 Netherlands Indies gulden, which included camera equipment (though it is not known what model(s) he used), chemicals, transportation, and accommodations. Meessen worked alone, never taking a partner while in the Indies, and documented the land and people in the colony in his albumen prints. In his ethnographic photography of the indigenous peoples of the Indies, he often had to overcome superstitions which, the Bataviaasch Handelsblad wrote, "made taking images of the people outside Java almost impossible". (Note: Original: "... fanatiekste bijgeloof het nemen van volkstypen buiten Java bijna onmogelijk maakt.") Others were more enthusiastic, including the villagers of Nias: "Upon arrival I fired a few shots and flew the Dutch flag. Soon the villagers came and asked what I wanted. Once I told them, they promised their assistance. At exactly 5 a.m. the following morning I found some 60 warriors waiting for me on the beach." (Note: Original: "Bij aankomst liet ik een paar schoten vallen, en haalde de Hollandsche vlag in top en al spoedig kwam men hooren wat ik wilde. Na kennisgeving daarvan beloofde men mij hulp voor den volgenden dag, om mijne goederen te transporteren, en prompt om 5 uur vond ik een 60 tal krijgers aan het strand.")

=== Return to the Netherlands ===
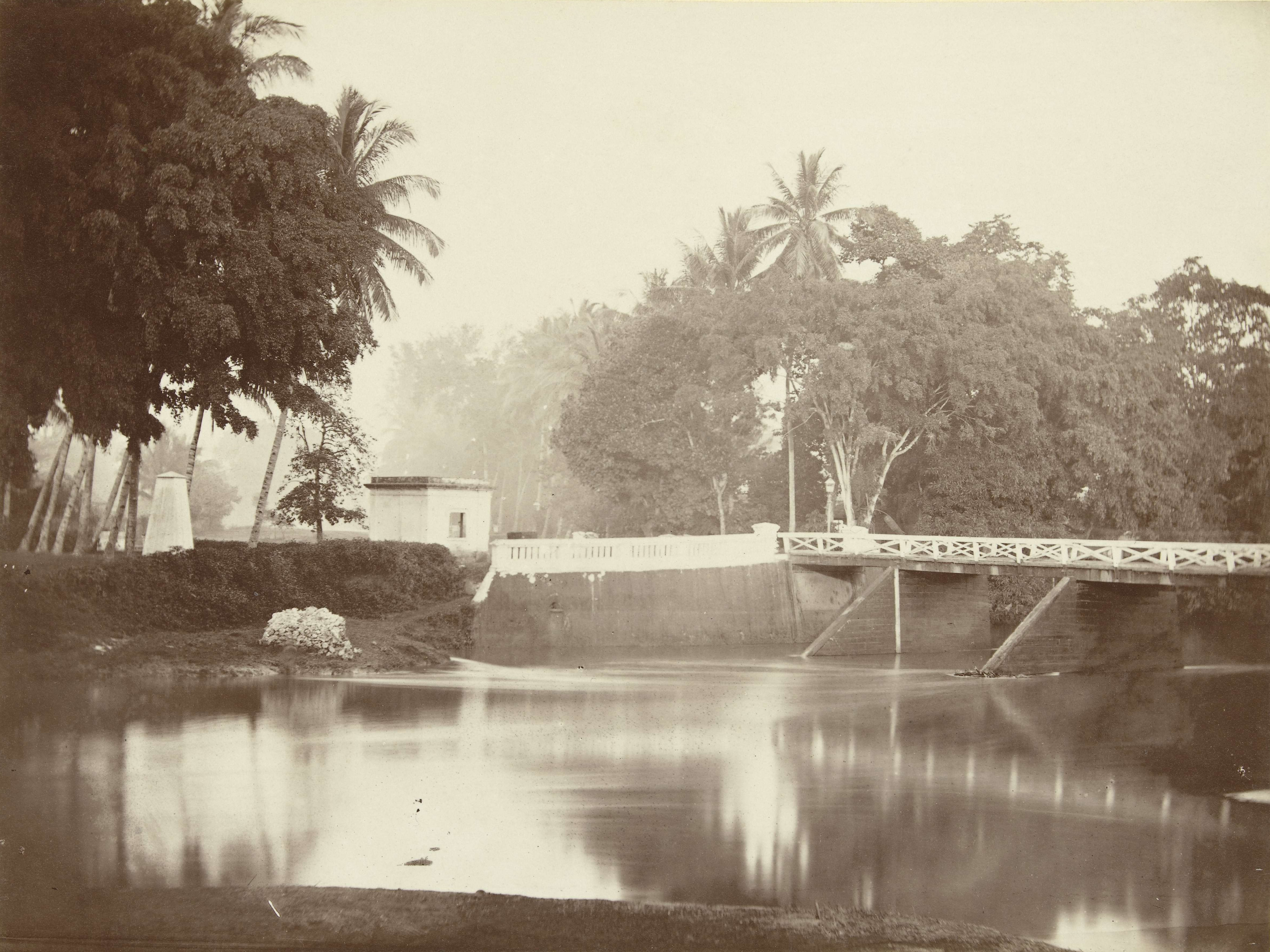
Ciliwung, Batavia, photographed by Meessen; after returning to the Netherlands, he actively marketed his images of the Indies.

In June 1869, Meessen and his wife returned to Batavia, and the following year they returned to Utrecht. There, in late 1870, Meessen partnered with Abraham Adrianus Vermeulen to open a new studio, named A. A. Vermeulen & Company. They signed a contract for five years, but this collaboration collapsed in March 1873. Boom and Wachlin suggest that Vermeulen – best known for portraits – had been interested in the possibility of expanding his range with landscapes, whereas Meessen required a place to print and market his images of the Indies. Indeed, in February 1871 Meessen gave an album of his better-executed photographs from his time in Java and Sumatra to King William III. This album of 153 images was lavishly decorated with silver and gold, and featured the names of Java, Sumatra, Borneo, and Nias in the corners. In the center were silver coconut and banana trees surrounding Dutch and Batavian weapons.

Over the next few years Meessen continued marketing his images of the Indies. In 1875, he published a collection of 250 – consisting of 175 landscapes and 75 portraits – through the Amsterdam-based printer De Bussy; this collection was titled Verzameling Fotografien van Nederlandsch Indië (Collection of Photographs of the Dutch East Indies), sold for 225 gulden, and came in a walnut box. At the 1875 Exposition Géographique in Paris, he exhibited these images to critical acclaim. The Bataviaasch Handelsblad, in one review, wrote that the attempt to document the Indies was commendable, and expressed hope that images of animals could also be taken. In 1883 Meessen again exhibited his photographs, this time at the International Colonial and Export Trade Exhibition in Amsterdam. Ultimately, however, he does not appear to have made a return on his investment.

Meessen's final years were migratory, with some time spent in Gorredijk and other parts of Opsterland, Friesland. He worked as a building superintendent, and later municipal architect. One of his projects in this capacity was an elementary school on Zuidwest Dubbele Street in Gorredijk, a Neo-Gothic building – possibly influenced by similar schools in Raamsdonkveer and Amsterdam – constructed to replace an older school which had been demolished. Meessen died in Opsterland on 14 November 1885 after being stricken by an illness three days earlier. The incomplete school was finished by Hidde Petrus Nicolaas Halbertsma. (Note: This school, which closed in 1955, now houses the Opsterland Museum. It is a Rijksmonument (Gorredijk Historie, De Voormalige).)

== Style and legacy ==
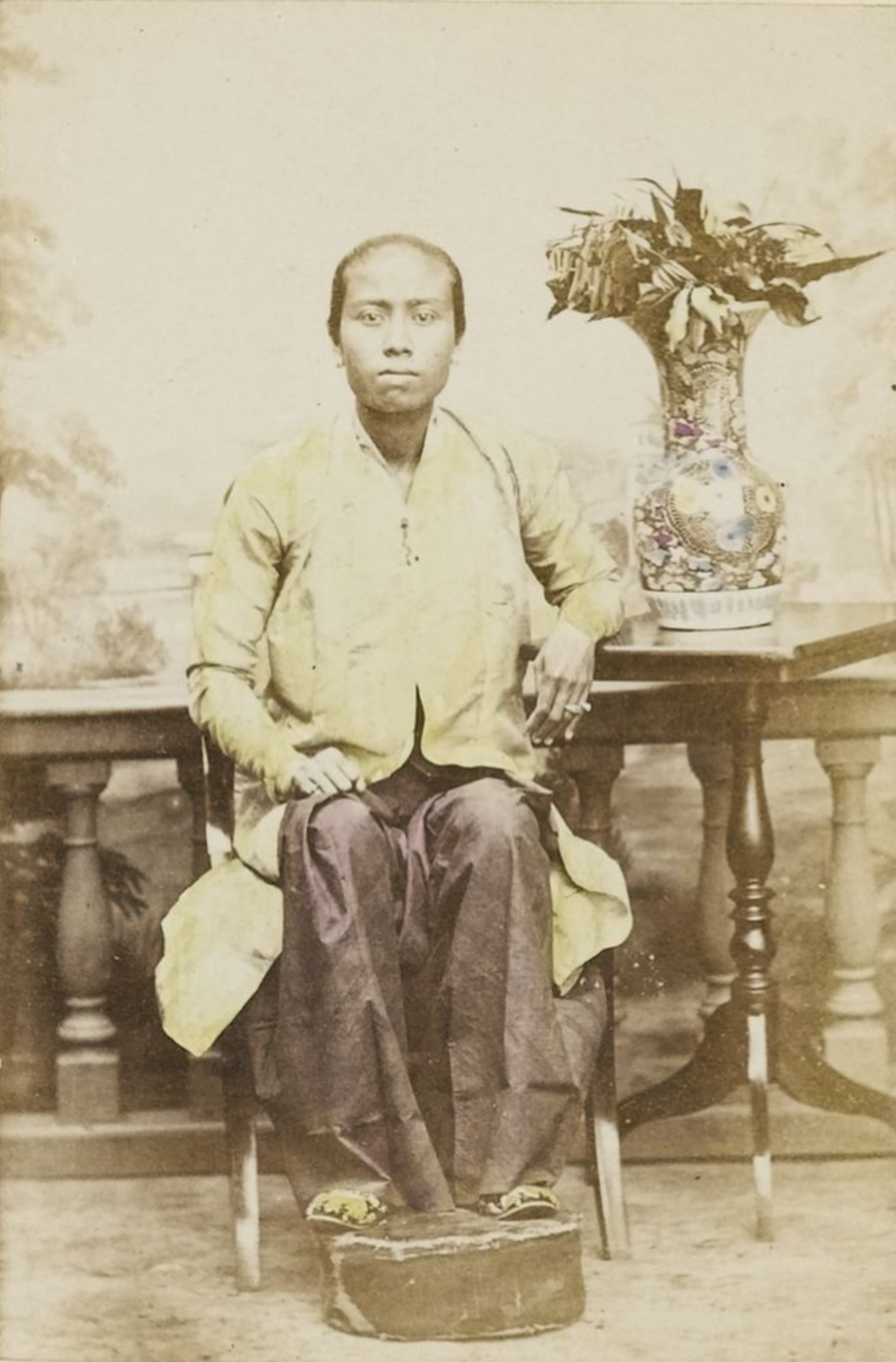
Hand-tinted photograph of a njai by Meessen, c. 1867. He described the concubines as a "necessary evil".

Reviewing the quality of Meessen's photography, Boom and Wachilin write that his Javanese pictures are among his best, whereas those from other islands are of more variable quality. They note considerable detail in his cityscapes. Meessen captured buildings that were popular with other photographers, including the Governor General's Palace and the home of Raden Saleh. Many of his studio portraits appear to be purely commercial, leading Boom and Wachlin to suggest that they were meant to fund Meessen's landscape photography. Some of his images, particularly the portraits, were hand-tinted.

Meessen's photographs from the album he gave to King William III are kept in the Hague at the National Library of the Netherlands. This album features a travelogue regarding Meessen's photography, as well as images from six islands (Java, Sumatra, Bangka, Belitung, Borneo, and Nias) and various ethnic groups, including the Javanese, Chinese, Dayaks, and Malays. He includes commentary on several images of people, noting in an image of a njai (concubine): "[They are] a necessary evil for the military. They preserve, in and outside the barracks, the best discipline, and prove invaluable in expeditions or sea journeys." (Note: Original: "Een noodzakelijk kwaad voor den militair, bewaren zij in en buiten de kaserne de beste tucht, terwijl op expeditiën of reizen over zee deze vrouwen onschatbare diensten bewijzen.")

Two further photographs, one of the river Ciliwung in Batavia, and another of Kali Mati in Padang, are held at the Rijksmuseum in Amsterdam. The Royal Netherlands Institute of Southeast Asian and Caribbean Studies holds a copy of the De Bussy publication, and the Leiden University Library holds 281 prints, 7 of which are of disputed provenance, which were donated to the Royal Dutch Geographical Society by Pieter Johannes Veth in 1891. The four extant collections of Meessen's work are considerably fewer than those of his contemporaries such as Woodbury and Page, and his oeuvre has been little studied or collected.
