= Unita (disambiguation) =

Unita may refer to:

- UNITA (Portuguese: União Nacional para a Independência Total de Angola, lit. 'National Union for the Total Independence of Angola'), an Angolan political party
- l'Unità (Italian: The Unity; unita.tv), Italian newspaper
- Unita Blackwell (1933–2019), U.S. civil rights activist and politician
- Yumi Unita, Japanese mangaka author of serial manga comic Bunny Drop

== See also ==
- Apamea unita (A. unita), a species of moth
- Caladenia nana subsp. unita (C. n. unita), a subspecies of pink fan orchid
- Manulea unita (M. unita), a species of moth
- Pecopteris unita (P. unita), a species of leafy plant
- Poria unita (P. unita), a species of fungus
- Sphaeria unita (S. unita), a species of fungal plant pathogen
- A-unit locomotives
- Unitas (disambiguation)
- Unit (disambiguation)
- A (disambiguation)
