= Hardinxveldse Korfbal Club =

- Leagues: Korfbal League (indoor), Ereklasse(outdoor)
- Founded: 17 June 1935; 89 years ago
- Location: Hardinxveld-Giessendam, Netherlands
- President: (Netherlands) Frank Kamsteeg
- Head coach: (Netherlands) Erik van Brenk
- Website: Official website

HKC (Hardinxveldse Korfbal Club) is a Dutch korfball club located in Hardinxveld-Giessendam, Netherlands.

== History ==
HKC was founded in 1935. Shortly after its founding, World War II began, making sports in general more difficult. When the war ended, the club joined the Christian Korfball Association (CKB). Until 1970, there were two korfball associations in the Netherlands: the CKB and the NKB, with the NKB being by far the largest. In 1963, HKC reached the highest division within the CKB, the Hoofdklasse, for the first time in the club's history. When the two associations merged into the current KNKV in 1970, the clubs were reclassified. At that time, HKC was placed in the 2nd league.

In 2023 HKC became champions in the Korfbal League 2 and promoted to the Korfbal League. In the outdoor competition, during the 2023–24 season the team promoted to Ereklasse.
