= 2020 IKF European Korfball Championship First Round =

2019 European Korfball Championship First Round
Tournament details
- Host country: Ukraine
- City: Lviv
- Dates: 1-3 November 2019
- Teams: 7
- Venue: 1 (in 1 host city)

Final positions
- Champions: Turkey
- Runners-up: Switzerland
- Third place: Greece
- Fourth place: Ukraine

Tournament statistics
- Matches played: 16
- Goals scored: 375 (23.44 per match)

The 2020 IKF European Korfball Championship First Round was held in Lviv, Ukraine from 1 to 3 November 2019. The tournament served as the first round of the 2020 IKF European Korfball Championships to be held in the Poland in 2020, with both the winner and runner-up qualifying for the 2020 IKF European Korfball B-Championship. Turkey and Switzerland qualified on 3 November 2019 as they won their semi-final matches against Greece and Ukraine respectively. Later that same day, Turkey beat Switzerland to win the tournament.

== Participating teams ==
Seven teams participated in the tournament: Armenia, Belarus, Greece, Sweden, Switzerland, Turkey and Ukraine.

== Group stage ==
Two groups (A and B) were drawn, four teams in group A and three teams in group B, with each team playing the other teams in their group once. The top two teams in these groups moved to the semi-finals, while the remaining three teams played another round-robin tournament to determine their final overall position.

All group stage matches were played at the Palats sportu “Halychyna” in Lviv on 1 and 2 November 2019.

=== Group A ===
Pos	Team	Pld	W	OTW	OTL	L	GF	GA	GD	Pts	Qualification
1	Turkey	3	3	0	0	0	73	16	+57	9	Semi-finals
2	Ukraine	3	2	0	0	1	27	29	−2	6	Semi-finals
3	Sweden	3	1	0	0	2	33	42	−9	3	Play-offs
4	Belarus	3	0	0	0	3	12	58	−46	0	Play-offs

Source: IKF

Team 1	Score	Team 2
Ukraine	3 − 17	Turkey
Sweden	16 − 4	Belarus
Ukraine	13 − 9	Sweden
Turkey	31 − 5	Belarus
Ukraine	11 − 3	Belarus
Turkey	25 − 8	Sweden

=== Group B ===
Pos	Team	Pld	W	OTW	OTL	L	GF	GA	GD	Pts	Qualification
1	Switzerland	2	2	0	0	0	29	19	+10	6	Semi-finals
2	Greece	2	1	0	0	1	23	16	+7	3	Semi-finals
3	Armenia	2	0	0	0	2	14	31	−17	0	Play-offs

Source: IKF

Team 1	Score	Team 2
Greece	14 − 4	Armenia
Switzerland	17 − 10	Armenia
Greece	9 − 12	Switzerland

== Semi-finals ==
Semi-finals
Turkey	18
Greece	6
Ukraine	11
Switzerland	15

Final
Turkey	18
Switzerland	8
Third place
Greece	14
Ukraine	11

== 5th–7th place play-offs ==
The teams finishing third & fourth in both groups played another round-robin group stage to determine fifth through seventh place.

Pos	Team	Pld	W	OTW	OTL	L	GF	GA	GD	Pts
1	Armenia	2	2	0	0	0	33	16	+17	6
2	Sweden	2	1	0	0	1	23	15	+8	3
3	Belarus	2	0	0	0	2	7	32	−25	0

Source: IKF

Team 1	Score	Team 2
Belarus	5 − 20	Armenia
Belarus	2 − 12	Sweden
Sweden	11 − 13	Armenia

== Final standing ==
Key
Qualified for the 2021 IKF European Korfball B-Championship

Rank	Team
1st place, gold medalist(s)	Turkey
2nd place, silver medalist(s)	Switzerland
3rd place, bronze medalist(s)	Greece
4	Ukraine
5	Armenia
6	Sweden
7	Belarus

1. Originally, Greece did not qualify, however following the withdrawal of France, they were invited as first reserves on 27 January 2020.
