= Royal Dutch Korfball Association =

Governing body of korfball in the Netherlands

- Founded: 2 June 1903; 123 years ago
- Headquarters: Zeist, Netherlands
- President: Rob Meijer
- Website: www.knkv.nl

The Royal Dutch Korfball Association (Dutch: Koninklijk Nederlands Korfbalverbond, or KNKV) is the governing body of korfball in the Netherlands. It organises the main Dutch korfball leagues (field and hall korfball), the more recreative leagues, and the Dutch national team.

== History ==
The association was founded on 2 June 1903 as Dutch Korfball Association (Dutch: Nederlandse Korfbal Bond, or NKB). In 1973 it fused with the Christian Korfball Association (Dutch: Christelijke Korfbalbond, or CKB). Part of the deal was that clubs that were part of the CKB did not have to play on sunday in the new constellation.

The Koninklijk Nederlands Korfbalverbond was one of the founders of the International Korfball Federation, with the Belgian Federation, on 11 June 1933.

== Competitions ==
Indoor	Outdoor
Korfbal League	Ereklasse
Korfbal League 2	Hoofdklasse
Hoofdklasse	Overgangsklasse
Overgangsklasse	1st up to 4th division
1st up to 4th division	
