= IKF U23 World Championship =

- Founded: 2008
- Region: International (IKF)
- Number of teams: 12
- Current champions: Netherlands (3rd title)
- Most successful team(s): Netherlands (3 titles)
- Website: International Korfball Federation
- 2020 IKF U23 World Championship

The IKF Korfball U23 World Championship, often simply known as the U23 Korfball World Championship, is an international korfball competition contested by the U23 national teams of the members of International Korfball Federation (IKF), the sport's global governing body.

== Results ==
	Year	Host	Champion	Second place	Third place
I Details	2008	Taiwan	Netherlands	Chinese Taipei	Belgium
II Details	2012	Spain	Netherlands	Belgium	Chinese Taipei
III Details	2016	Czech Republic	Netherlands	Chinese Taipei	Czech Republic
IV Details	2020				
