= LDODK =

Dutch korfball club

- Leagues: Korfbal League
- Founded: 1996
- Arena: Kortezwaag
- Location: Gorredijk, Netherlands
- President: Gouke de Vries
- Head coach: Erik Wolsink
- Website: ldodk.nl

LDODK (Leer Door Oefening De Korfbalsport) is a Dutch korfball club in Gorredijk, Netherlands. The club was founded in 1996 after a fusion between clubs from the towns of Gorredijk and Ter Wispel. The team plays in green shirts and black shorts / skirts.

== History ==
Since the promotion to the Korfbal League after the 2011/2012 season LDODK has been represented in the top division for 4 season now.

== Current squad ==
Squad for the 2015–16 season – Updated: 1 April 2016

Women

- 1 (Netherlands) Marjon Visser
- 2 (Netherlands) Diana van der Vorst
- 4 (Netherlands) Myrthe Heres
- 5 (Netherlands) Berber Buis
- 6 (Netherlands) Hilde de Boer
- 8 (Netherlands) Femke Faber
- 9 (Netherlands) Betty Jansma
- 10 (Netherlands) Daniëlle Hulst
- 22 (Netherlands) Marit Minkes

Men

- 11 (Netherlands) Erwin Zwart
- 13 (Netherlands) Jenmar de Graaf
- 14 (Netherlands) Martijn Zwart
- 15 (Netherlands) Andre Zwart
- 16 (Netherlands) Markus de Boer
- 17 (Netherlands) Collin van der Molen
- 18 (Netherlands) Henk Bijker
- 19 (Netherlands) Jurjen Bosma
- 20 (Netherlands) Menno Russchen
