= Gorredijk =

Gorredijk De Gordyk
- Town
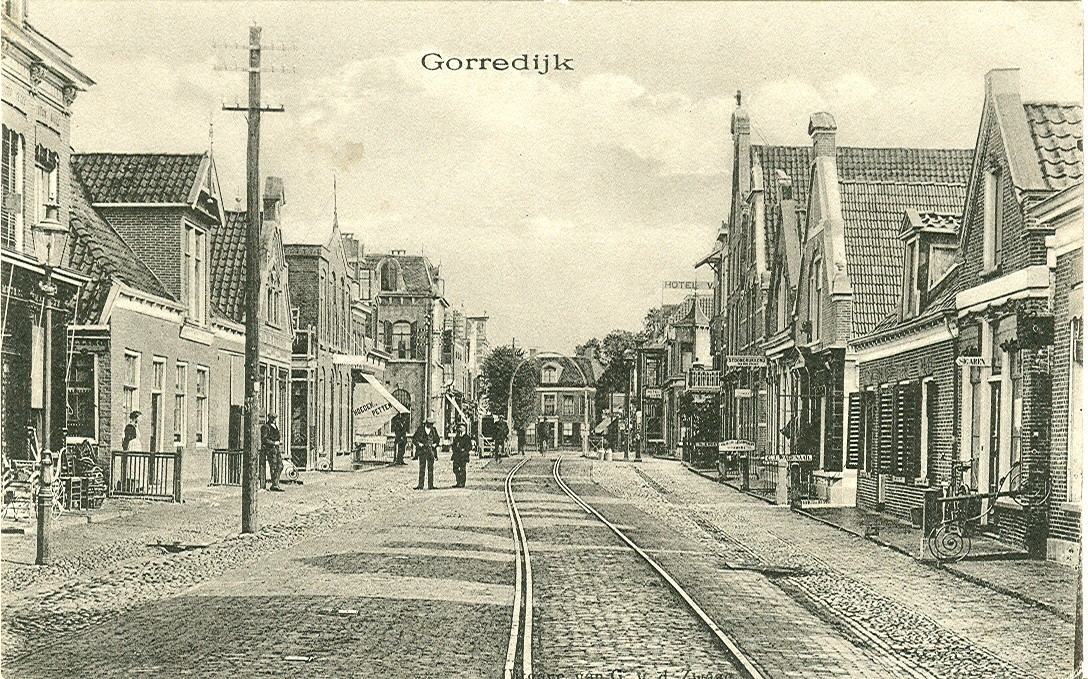
- Gorredijk, c. 1914

- Flag Coat of arms

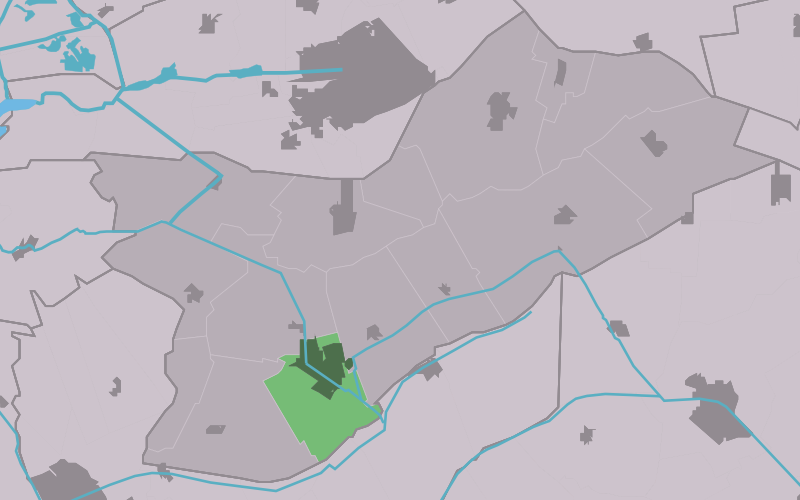
- Location in Opsterland municipality

- Location in the Netherlands Gorredijk (Netherlands)
- Country: Netherlands
- Province: Friesland
- Municipality: Opsterland

Population (2019)
  - Total: 7,360
- Time zone: UTC+1 (CET)
  - Summer (DST): UTC+2 (CEST)
- Postal code: 8401
- Telephone area: 0513

Gorredijk (Dutch pronunciation: [ˌɣɔrəˈdɛik]; West Frisian: De Gordyk) is the largest town in the municipality of Opsterland, in the Dutch province of Friesland. Gorredijk had a population of 7,360 in 2019.

The hamlets of Easterein and Kortezwaag are also part of the town. The latter was an independent village until 1962. Gorredijk and Kortezwaag then formed a double village as Gorredijk-Kortezwaag, but after a few years it was decided to shorten this to Gorredijk, so the older Kortezwaag became a neighborhood of Gorredijk in 1969.

== History ==
The Opsterlandse Compagnonsvaart runs through the center of Gorredijk. The town is a so-called vlecke that was created by peat extraction. In the past, Gorredijk was mainly the place where goods were imported, stored and traded.

A great amount of peat passed through Gorredijk, especially from the area behind Tijnje. There was dire poverty in the region. Jacob van Lennep says the following about it in 1823: "A little further west than the Heereveen is the Gordijcke, where there still live some half savages or cavemen, whose houses are half underground and who live from robbery and begging. Of the three criminals who are sentenced in Friesland, one is from that place."

Gorredijk used to look very different. Extensive peat bogs covered southeast Friesland. This peat was later excavated and this "industry" attracted many people to these then sparsely populated areas. The original inhabitants were farmers. They grew buckwheat, oats, rye, peas, beans, flax and herbs. They also kept sheep and bees. Cattle was kept sparingly.

The farmers in the town may have partly obtained their hay from the low countries between Tijnje and Terwispel. They will also have extracted pieces of heather in and near the Gorrevenen, which were located in the direction of present-day Jubbega. These Gorrevenen were excavated by the Heren Compagnon in the seventeenth century. Jonker Dekema in particular had many possessions here. Jonkersland (Jonkerslân) could also have been called Dekema's land.

A channel was needed to transport peat. This did not exist in 1622, but is mentioned in writing in 1630. The digging of the Hegedyk around 1631 is considered the "starting point" of the peat colony Gordijk. As there was now a channel to the Gorrevenen, the first house was built at the Hooge wech, soon followed by others. Over the hole in the dike a Hoogholtje bridge was built, underneath which the peat ships could sail with masts lowered.

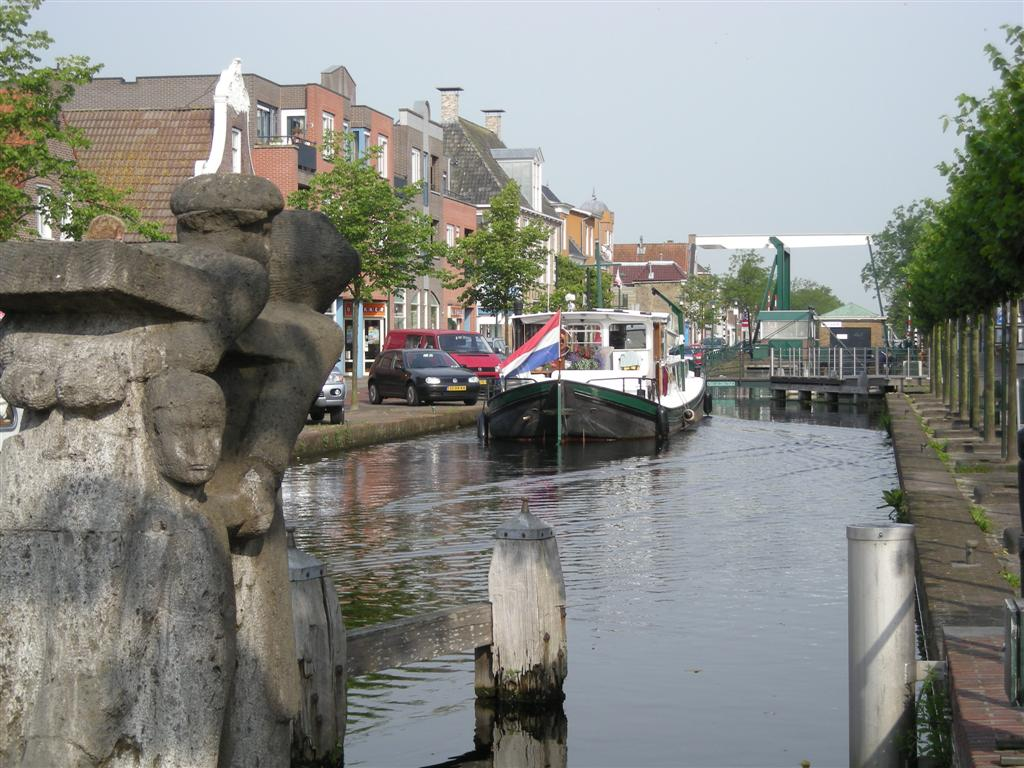
Opsterlandse Compagnonsvaart

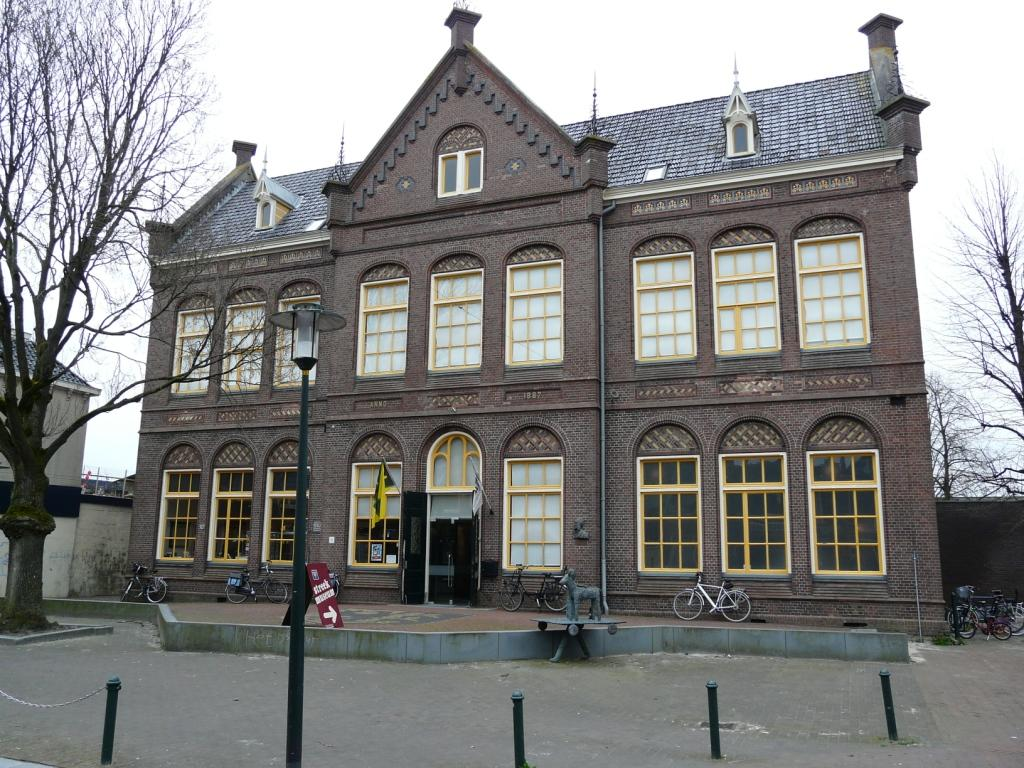
Museum Opsterlân

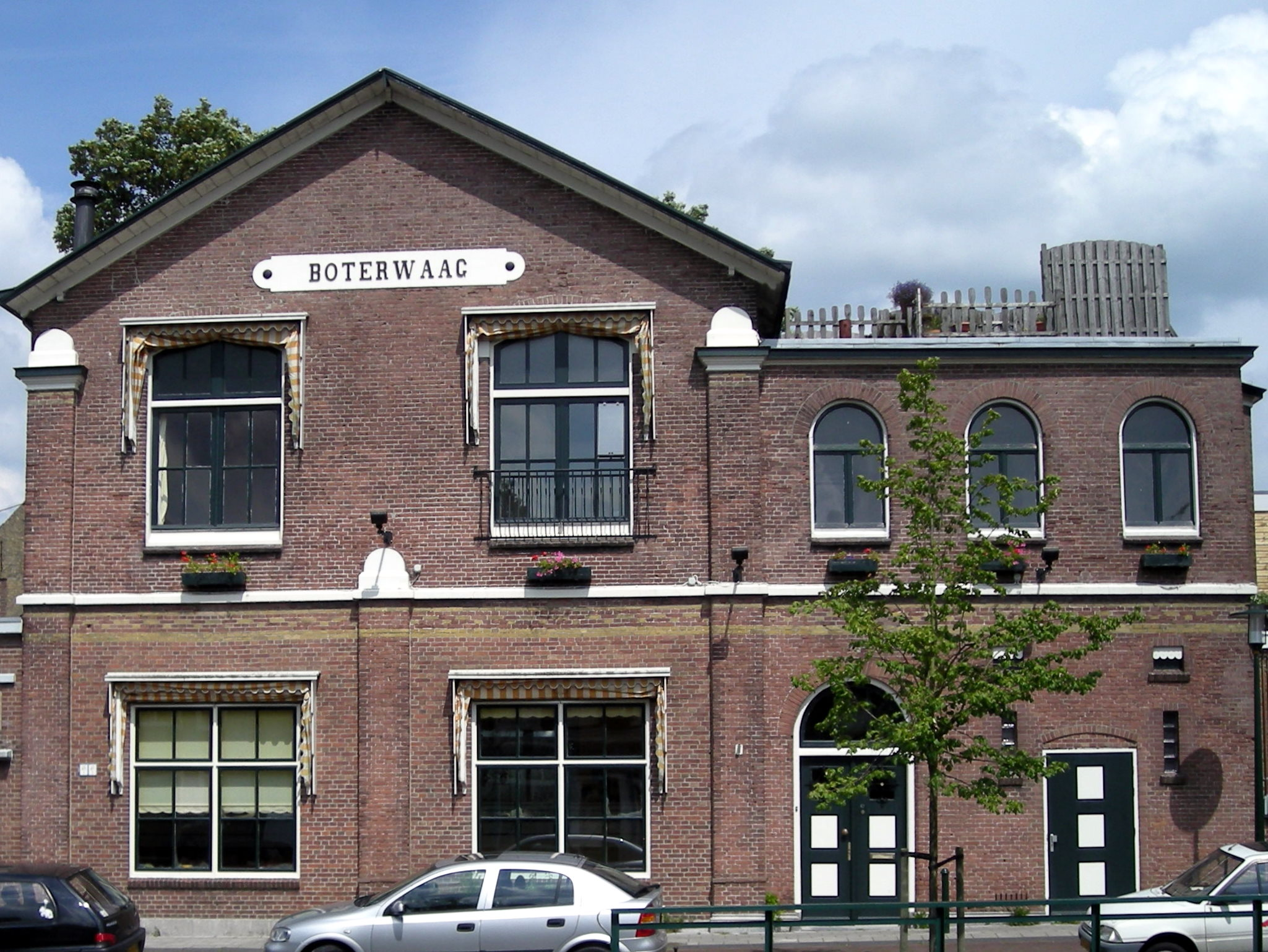
Boterwaag weigh house

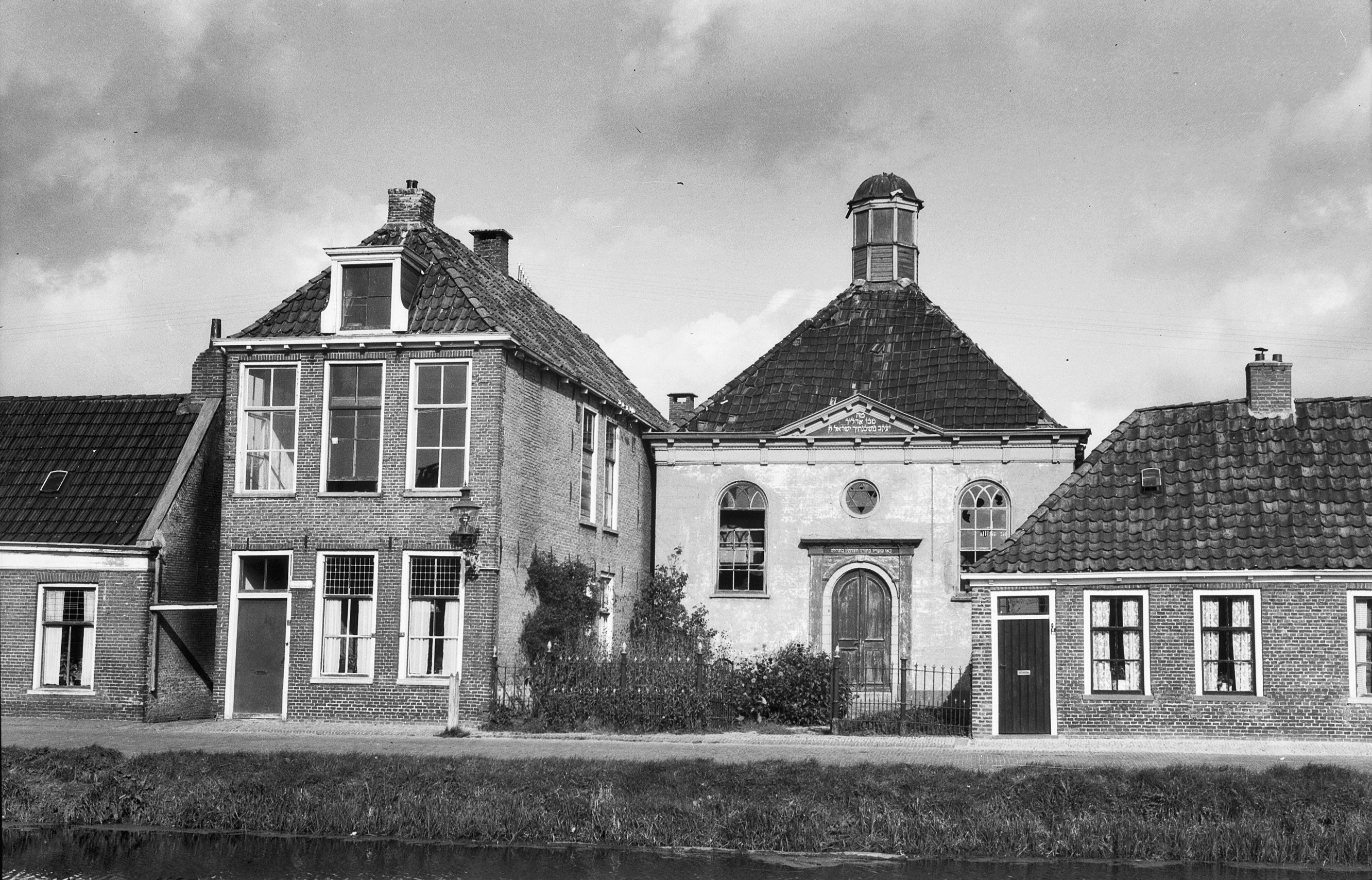
Former synagogue, 1949

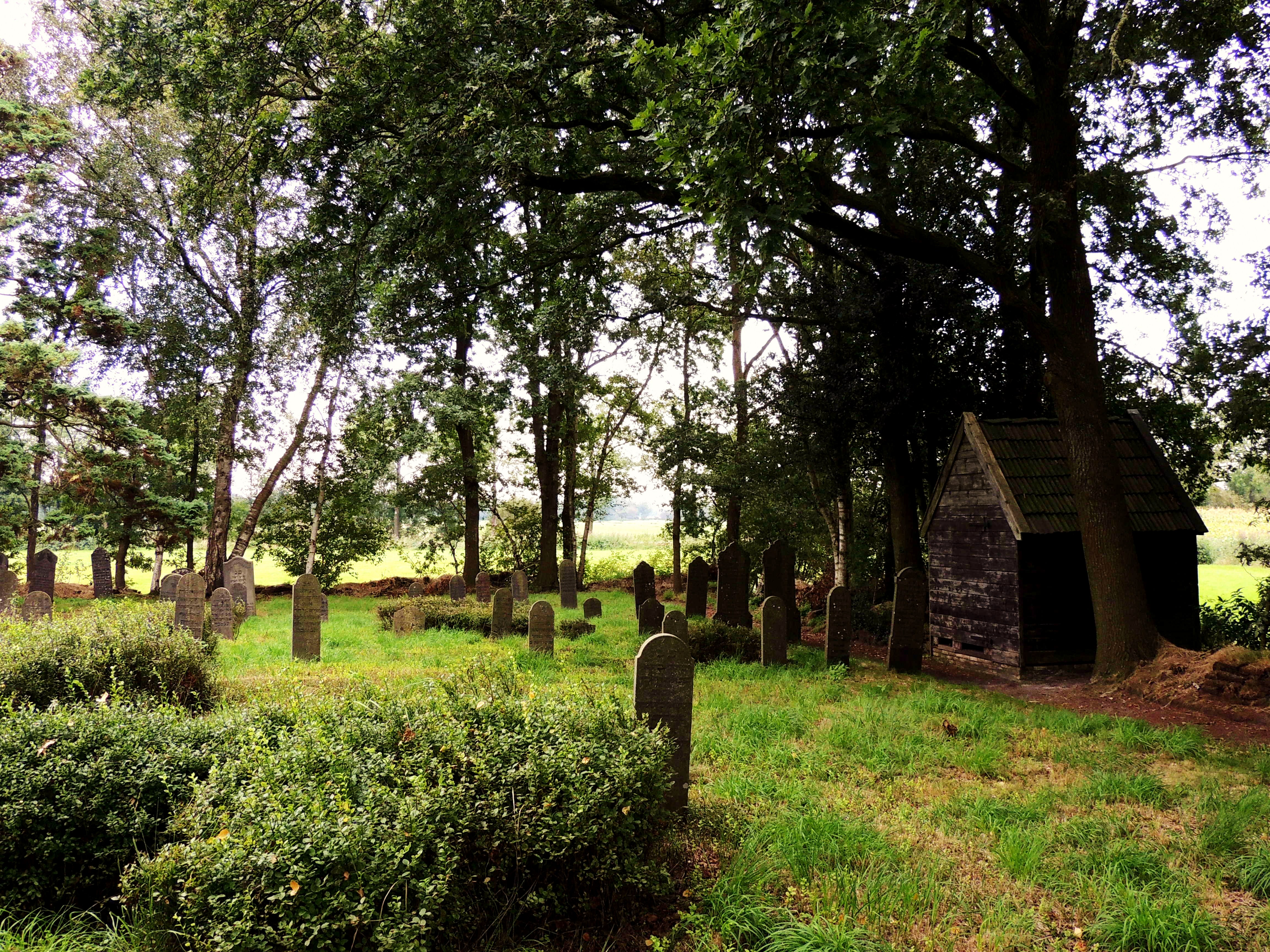
Jewish cemetery, Kortezwaag

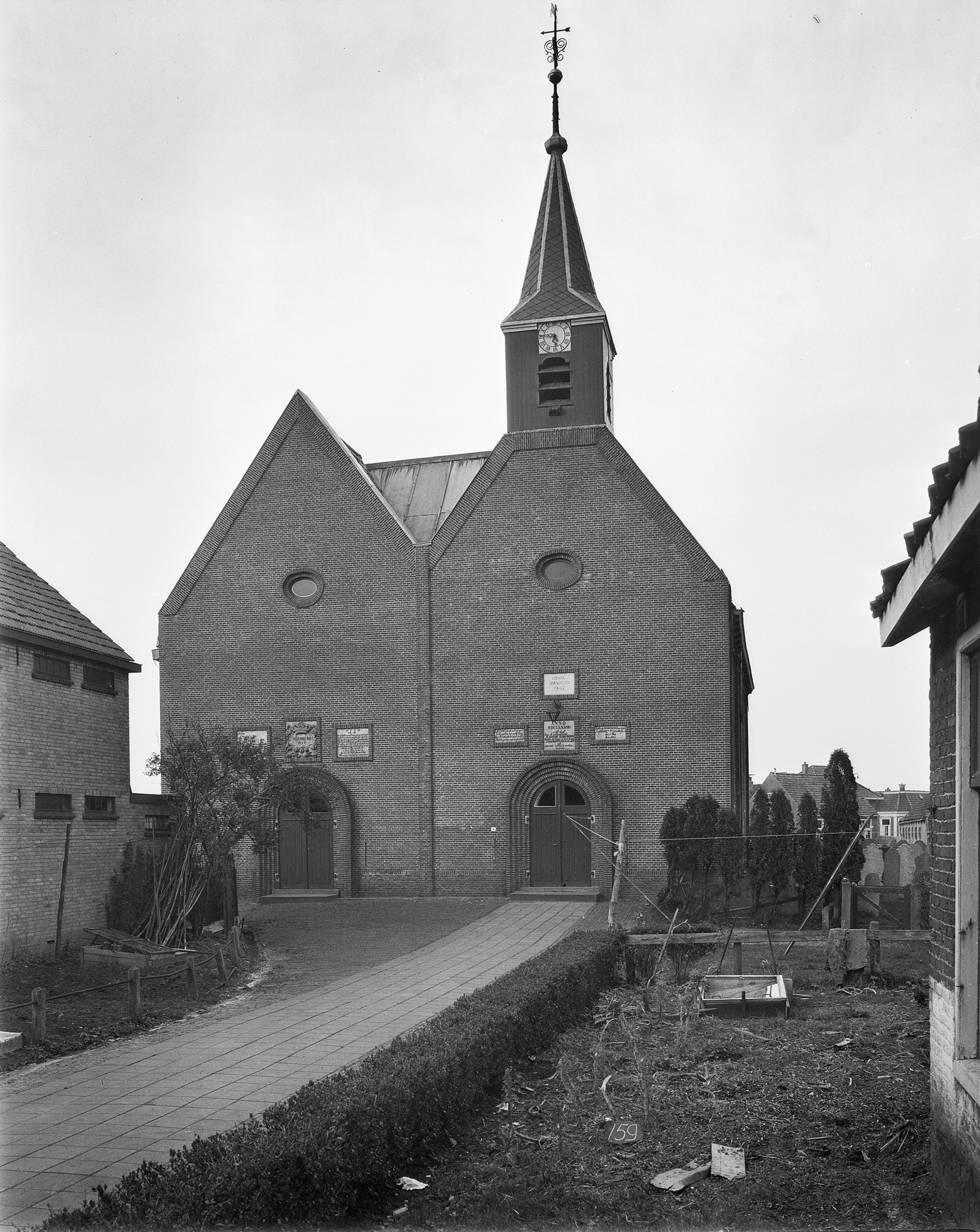
Former reformed church, April 1959

== Description ==
=== Plaatselijk Belang Gorredijk ===
On 22 November 1880, an organization called Plaatselijk Belang (English: Local Interest) was established to aid the inhabitants of Gorredijk. For example, the local population could borrow money from the organization and Plaatselijk Belang involved itself in issues in and around town, such as the connection to the railway network of the Nederlandsche Tramweg Maatschappij. Surviving to the present, the organization remains closely involved and along with local interest groups in neighboring communities, forms a crucial dialog partner of the municipality of Opsterland. The organization periodically consults with the municipal government and informs those interested in current events via its website.

=== Education ===
Gorredijk is home to three primary schools: de Treffer, Loevestein, and Protestant Christian school de Librije. Secondary education is provided by the Burgemeester Harmsma School and most local students look to Heerenveen and Drachten for their tertiary education needs. Museum Opsterlân is also housed in a former school building, which was constructed in 1887 to a design by architect Jacobus Anthonie Meessen and served as a primary school until 1955.

=== Town center ===
Gorredijk is a center for retail and employment for surrounding communities. The town originated as a linear settlement along the Opsterlandse Compagnonsvaart with the most important streets being the Brouwerswal, Kerkewal, Molenwal and Langewal. The latter is crossed by the Hoofdstraat or main street. Neighborhoods such as Het Leantsje, De Helling and De Vlecke were built in the early 1970s. In the 1980s, streets such as Spinnerij, Brouwerij, Wolkammerij, Weverij, Mouterij and Kuperij were developed. The most recent construction project is the Loevestein plan, which has closed significant distance between Gorredijk and the nearby village of Lippenhuizen.

=== Market ===
From 1694 on, Gorredijk has been given the right to hold a weekly market. The former spring and autumn livestock market also dates back to those days, when cattle left or returned to the barns, respectively. The farmers then brought their butter to the weigh house at the Boterwaag and their grains to the commodity market at the Korenbeurs. Both currently serve as office buildings. As the town grew, industry kept pace. There have been three shipyards, a rope-making shop and two lime kilns in Gorredijk, though none remain at present. The former village of Kortezwaag had remained a farming community through the centuries.

=== Nightlife ===
Gorredijk had a dance hall in the 1970s, but the venue was shuttered alongside a music club on the industrial estate. Most youngsters from the town go out in Heerenveen, Drachten, Groningen or Zevenhuizen and Marum. Local pubs attract a small but regular audience. At the beginning of 1900 there were more than 100 "living room bars" in Gorredijk and the town brewed its own spirits: Gerard Brons Beerenburg and jenever. The Gerard Brons brand still exists, but is now brewed by Boomsma distillery in Leeuwarden.

== Religion ==
Although Gorredijk has the pretense of being a "red" socialist town—Domela Nieuwenhuis came from the area—it has a number of church communities. There is a Catholic Church, a Protestant congregation, a Mennonite community, and a Kingdom Hall of the Jehovah's Witnesses. Gorredijk has had its own Dutch Reformed Church since 1683. In 1896, a church bell from the town was put up for sale, which can now be found in the Rijksmuseum in Amsterdam. Dated to the 12th century, it is unknown where this bell saw use.

Gorredijk has a rich Jewish past. There was a synagogue and a Jewish school. In the 1880s the Jewish family De Haan, with the then very young future authors Jacob Israël and Carry, lived there for a few years. Only a handful of Jews survived World War II. In a meadow towards Jubbega one can still find a historic Jewish cemetery.

During the war it was relatively quiet in Gorredijk, although there were quite a few people in the resistance in one way or another. On the eve of the liberation, there was a shooting near the draw bridge in the main street, which is now named after the fallen resistance fighter Gerke Numan. In the vicinity of the town, as elsewhere in Friesland, there were many hiding places. During the occupation, a number of Allied aircraft were shot down in the area, of which a crew of six from a British Vickers Wellington bomber are buried in the local graveyard.

== Sports and recreation ==
Sports clubs in Gorredijk include football association VV Gorredijk and korfball association LDODK. In addition, the town has a volleyball association Reva, rugby association De Wrotters, gymnastics association Stânfries, a tennis association, and an outdoor swimming pool.

== Notable people ==
- Jodocus Heringa (1765–1840), theologian
- Roelof Kuipers (1855–1922), architect
- Tjeerd Kuipers (1857–1942), architect
- Heinze Bakker (1942–2021), sports journalist
