= 2024 IKF U21 World Korfball Championship =

Sporting event in Turkey

Tournament details
- Host country: Turkey
- Dates: 6–13 July 2024
- Teams: 12

Final positions
- Champions: Netherlands (2nd title)
- Runners-up: Belgium
- Third place: Chinese Taipei

The second edition of the IKF U21 World Korfball Championship took place in Kemer, Turkey and has been organized by the International Korfball Federation.

The Netherlands won the trophy.

== Group stage ==
Competing countries were divided into two groups of six teams.

=== Group A ===
Pos	Team	Pld	W	L	GF	GA	GD	Pts		NED	TPE	(Catalonia) CAT	CHN	TUR	IND
1	Netherlands (Q)	5	5	0	195	43	+152	15	Quarterfinals			41–9	48–11		
2	Chinese Taipei (Q)	5	4	1	119	63	+56	12	Quarterfinals	11–26		20–16			27–3
3	Catalonia (Q)	5	3	2	92	88	+4	9	Quarterfinals				18–13	22–11	27–3
4	China (Q)	5	2	3	76	127	−51	6	Quarterfinals		11–32				24–13
5	Turkey (E)	5	1	4	62	112	−50	3		7–31	7–29		16–17		21–13
6	India (E)	5	0	5	37	148	−111	0		5–49					

Updated to match(es) played on 10 July 2024. Source:
(E) Eliminated; (Q) Qualified for the phase indicated

=== Group B ===
Pos	Team	Pld	W	L	GF	GA	GD	Pts		BEL	GER	MAS	HKG	NZL	AUS
1	Belgium (Q)	5	5	0	172	28	+144	15	Quarterfinals		33–9		31–5	30–7	
2	Germany (Q)	5	3	2	83	89	−6	9	Quarterfinals			9–12	19–13		
3	Malaysia (Q)	5	3	2	66	80	−14	9	Quarterfinals	5–34					24–11
4	Hong Kong (Q)	5	3	2	65	88	−23	9	Quarterfinals			13–11		18–17	16–10
5	New Zealand (E)	5	1	4	72	91	−19	3			18–21	13–14			
6	Australia (E)	5	0	5	44	126	−82	0		2–44	13–25			8–17	

Updated to match(es) played on 10 July 2024. Source:
(E) Eliminated; (Q) Qualified for the phase indicated

== Final stages ==
11 July 2024 Quarter-final 1	Chinese Taipei	27–8	Malaysia
14:15 (local time)
		Report

11 July 2024 Quarter-final 2	Germany	7–20	Catalonia
16:00 (local time)
		Report

11 July 2024 Quarter-final 3	Netherlands	55–8	Hong Kong
17:45 (local time)
		Report

11 July 2024 Quarter-final 4	Belgium	32–5	China
19:30 (local time)
		Report

12 July 2024 Game 31	Turkey	18–10	Australia
10:45 (local time)
		Report

12 July 2024 Game 32	New Zealand	20–15	India
12:30 (local time)
		Report

12 July 2024 Semi-final 1	Malaysia	13–24	China
14:15 (local time)
		Report

12 July 2024 Semi-final 2	Germany	22–16	Hong Kong
16:00 (local time)
		Report

12 July 2024 Semi-final 3	Chinese Taipei	16–20	Belgium
17:45 (local time)
		Report

12 July 2024 Semi-final 4	Catalonia	7–36	Netherlands
19:30 (local time)
		Report

13 July 2024 Places 11/12	Australia	20–21	India
9:00 (local time)
		Report

13 July 2024 Places 9/10	Turkey	30–17	New Zealand
10:45 (local time)
		Report

13 July 2024 Places 7/8	Malaysia	16–13	Hong Kong
12:30 (local time)
		Report

13 July 2024 Places 5/6	China	13–17	Germany
14:15 (local time)
		Report

13 July 2024 Bronze medal	Chinese Taipei	19–9	Catalonia
16:00 (local time)
		Report

13 July 2024 Final	Belgium	6–24	Netherlands
17:45 (local time)
		Report

IKF U21 World Korfball Championship

2nd title

== Top scorers ==
Rank	Name	Goals
1	Pei-Yun Wu (Chinese Taipei)	39
2	Jorien Jordaan (Netherlands)	34
3	Joke van Maldeghem (Belgium)	33

== Final ranking ==
Rank	Team
1st place, gold medalist(s)	Netherlands
2nd place, silver medalist(s)	Belgium
3rd place, bronze medalist(s)	Chinese Taipei
4	Catalonia
5	Germany
6	China
7	Malaysia
8	Hong Kong
9	Turkey
10	New Zealand
11	India
12	Australia

== See also ==
- List of national korfball associations
- IKF World Korfball Ranking
