= Tony Unitas =

Canadian boxer and promoter (1924–1991)

Personal information
- Nationality: (Canada) Canadian
- Born: Tony Conrad Unitas; March 7, 1924 Toronto, Ontario
- Died: January 29, 1991 (aged 66) Toronto, Ontario
- Weight: Middleweight

Boxing career

Boxing record
- Wins: 175
- Losses: 23

Tony Unitas (March 7, 1924 – January 29, 1991) was a Canadian boxer, boxing promoter, and founder of a Toronto-based boxing gym, where he served as a manager and trainer. He was a prominent figure in the Canadian boxing community.

== Career ==
=== Boxing career ===
Tony Unitas entered boxing at 10 years old during the 1930s.

He became an Army boxer in the early 1940s, who became Pacific Fleet Middleweight Champion from 1942 until 1944. He turned pro and won the Canadian Middleweight Boxing Championship title. His biggest fight was against Winnipeg's Eddie Zastre, the Canadian middleweight champion, whom he knocked down several times despite losing the non-title bout. He also fought Rocky Marciano in a six-round exhibition around 1952, which was declared a draw.

He retired in 1955 with a professional record of 175–23. Even after retiring, he stayed involved in boxing through management and promotion.

=== Canadian Boxing Hall of Fame ===
In the late 1960s, Unitas became the founder and director of the Canadian Boxing Hall of Fame, and hosted annual awards ceremonies. He was among the first inductees into the Canadian hall.

=== Unitas Boxing Weekly ===
The Unitas Boxing Weekly, once Canada's leading boxing news magazine, was created by Tony Unitas. He was the publisher, editor, and chief contributor.

=== Newsboys Boxing Club ===
Unitas founded the Newsboys Boxing Club in downtown Toronto in 1975. It hosted many Canadian, Commonwealth, and Olympic champions, including Donovan Boucher, Willie Featherstone, and Egerton Marcus. In 1979, he opened the Bayview Boxing And Youth Centre in North York.

== Personal life ==
He was a distant cousin of Johnny Unitas.

== Death ==
Tony Unitas died in Toronto, Ontario, on Thursday, January 29, 1991, at 66 years old. After battling a brain hemorrhage at North York General Hospital since November 5, 1990, he died from a related infection.

== Legacy ==
Tony Unitas was an inductee of the Canadian Boxing Hall of Fame in 1965.

He later appeared on one of Brown's Boxing Cards in 1985 as a manager with 45 years of experience.

Unitas was inducted into the World Boxing Hall of Fame on November 16, 1990, dying before he could travel to Los Angeles for the honor.

In 1996, the first annual Tony Unitas Memorial Amateur Boxing Tournament was hosted in Toronto.
