= AW.DTV =

- Leagues: Korfbal League 2 (indoor), Ereklasse(outdoor)
- Founded: 1 November 1902; 123 years ago (as DTV)
- Arena: Sportgebouw Bibian Mentel, Amsterdam
- Location: Amsterdam, Netherlands
- Team colors: Red/black
- President: (Netherlands) Hans de Wind
- Head coach: (Netherlands) Maarten van Brenk en Jannie van der Vaart

AW.DTV (Allen Weerbaar De Twee Vijfjarige) is a Dutch korfball club located in Amsterdam, Netherlands. It is a fusion club between AW (Allen Weerbaar) and DTV (De Twee Vijfjarige). The founding date of 1 November 1902 of the oldest of the two clubs (DTV) is used as official founding date. The club plays their home games in sports accommodation Gaasperdam. The team plays in red shirts and black shorts / skirts.

== History ==
The 2015/2016 season was the first ever presence of AW.DTV in the Korfbal League, which meant the Amsterdam derby against Blauw-Wit took place on the highest level. At the end of the season AW.DTV ended up in the relegation zone and needed top play a promotion/relegation play-off.

== Honours ==
- Dutch national champion outdoor, 7x (1905, 1906, 1909, 1918, 1920, 1923, 1931), all from DVT club
- Dutch national champion indoor, 4x (1975, 1977, 1981, 1984), all from Allen Weerbaar club
