= Nijeveen =

- Village
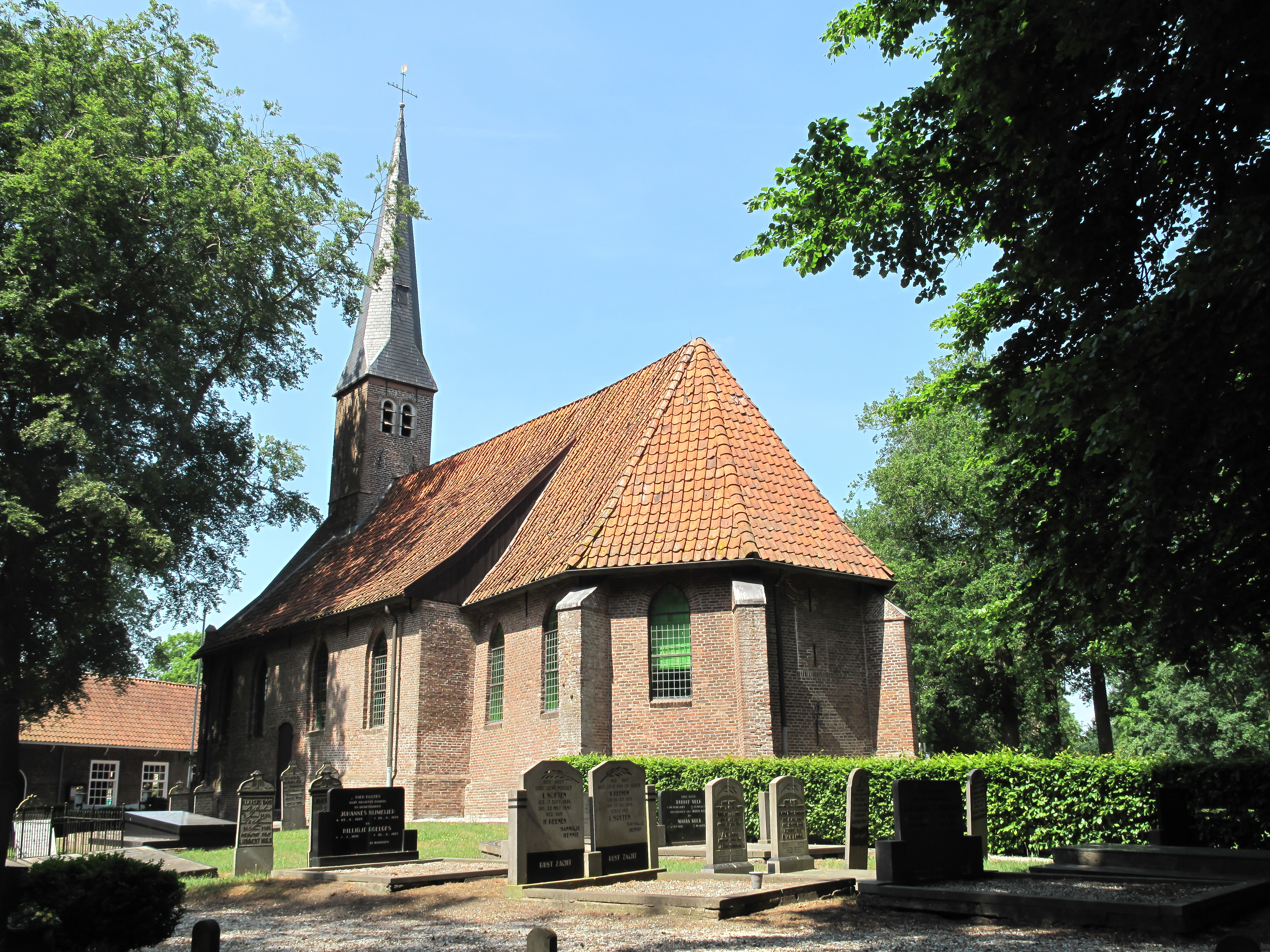
- Dutch Reformed church

- Flag Coat of arms

- Location of the village in the province of Drenthe Nijeveen (Netherlands)
- Coordinates: 52°43′58″N 6°10′3″E
- Country: Netherlands
- Province: Drenthe
- Municipality: Meppel

Area
  - Total: 24.91 km^{2} (9.62 sq mi)
- Elevation: 0.9 m (3.0 ft)

Population (2021)
  - Total: 3,960
  - Density: 159/km^{2} (412/sq mi)
- Time zone: UTC+1 (CET)
  - Summer (DST): UTC+2 (CEST)
- Postal code: 7948
- Dialing code: 0522

Nijeveen is a village in the Dutch province of Drenthe. It is a part of the municipality of Meppel, and lies about 5 km northwest of Meppel.

== History ==
The village was first mentioned in 1310 as "in Hesselrevene", and means "new bog". Nijeveen is a road village which started as a peat excavation settlement.

In 1477, a piece of land was purchased by the farmers in the centre of the hamlet to build a church and clergy house. The church was enlarged in 1627 and the 18th century. The tower dates shortly after 1477, but has a date of 1683 when it is probably restored or rebuilt.

Nijeveen was home to 390 people in 1840.

Since 1976 there is a German windmill named De Sterrenberg which has a cap winded by a fantail. Nijeveen was a separate municipality until 1998, when it was amalgamated with Meppel.

== Notable people ==
- Petrus Johannes Waardenburg (1886–1979), ophthalmologist and geneticist, was born in Nijeveen.

== Gallery ==
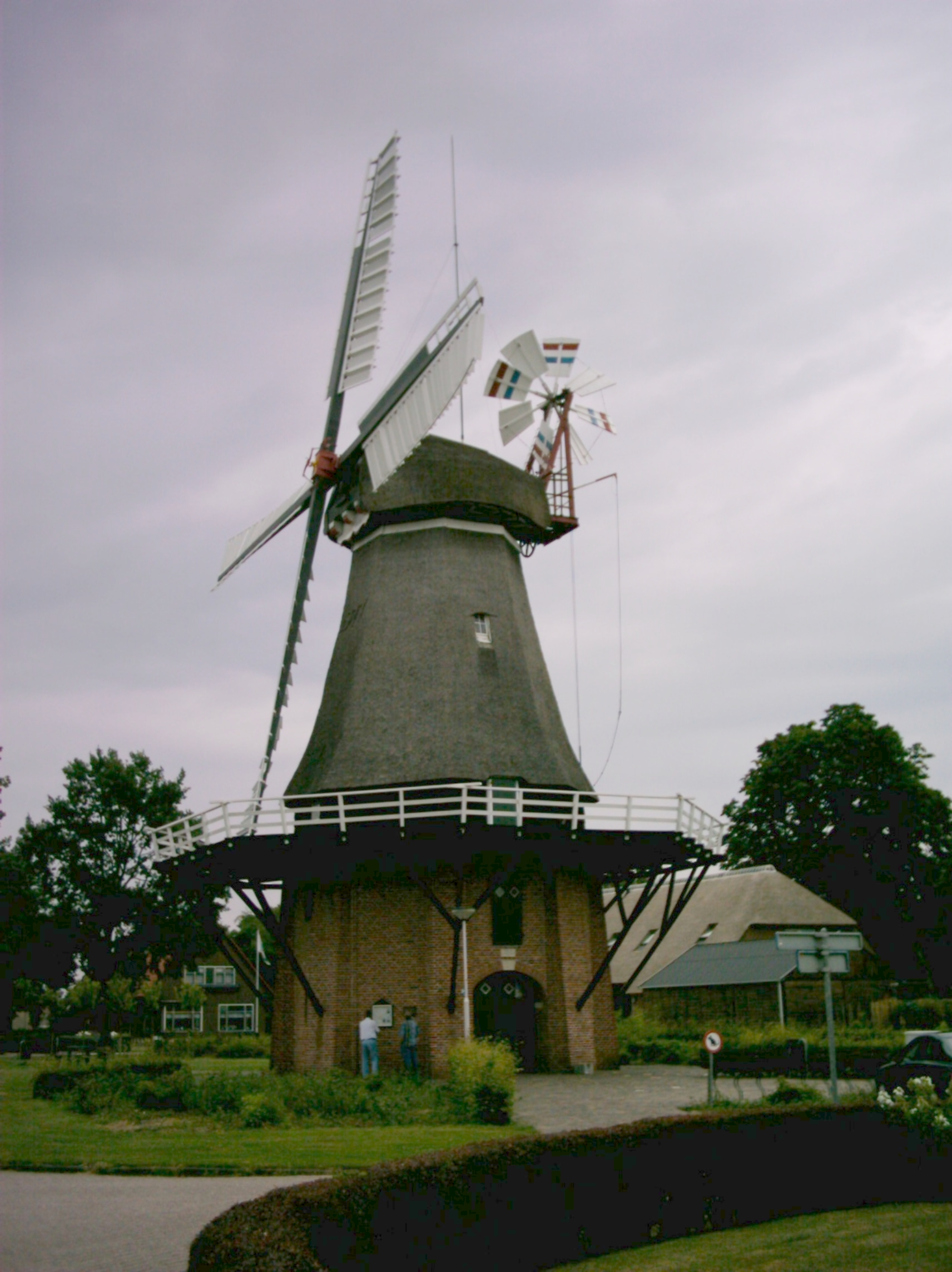
Windmill De Sterrenberg in Nijeveen

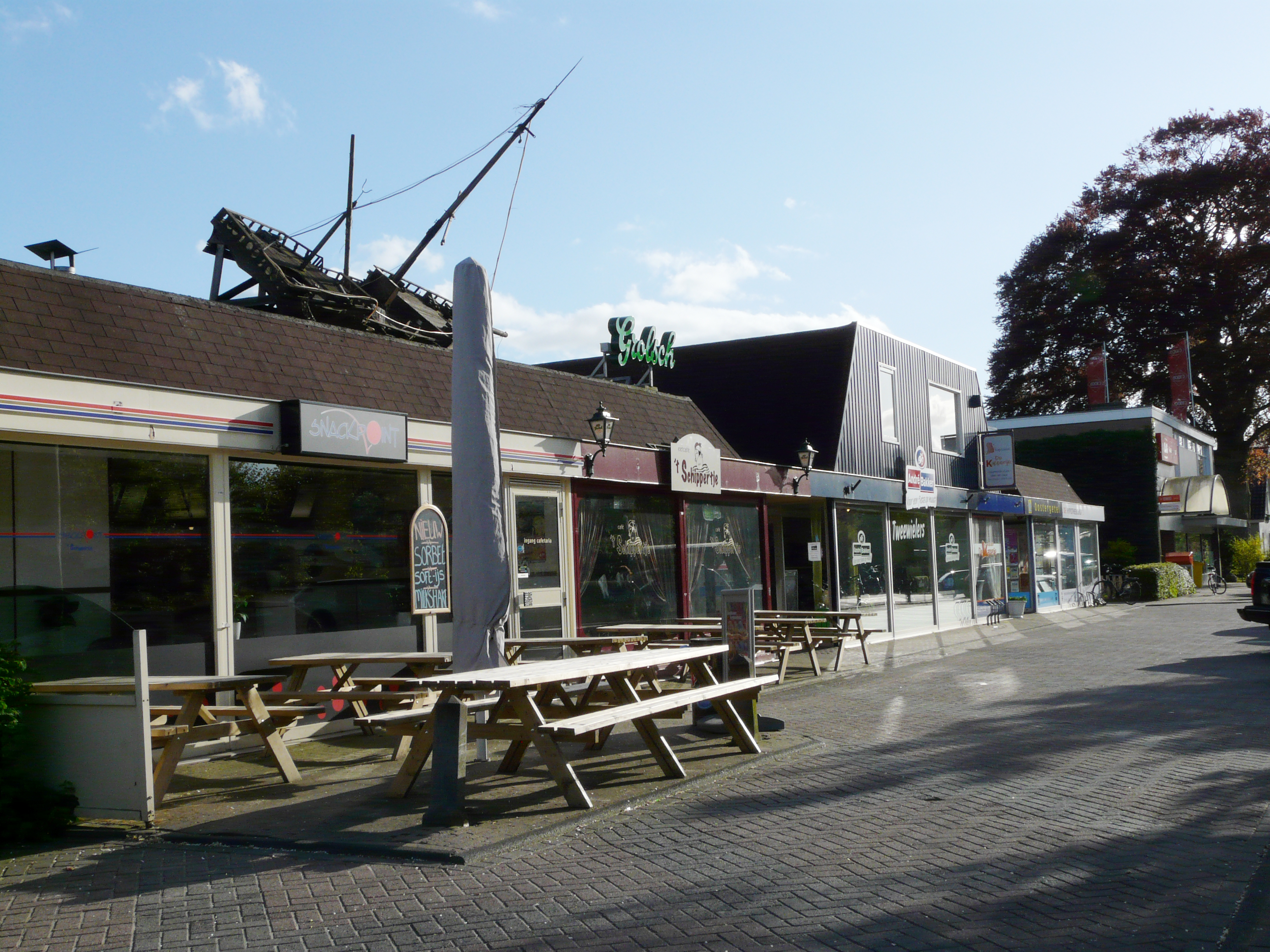
Village street

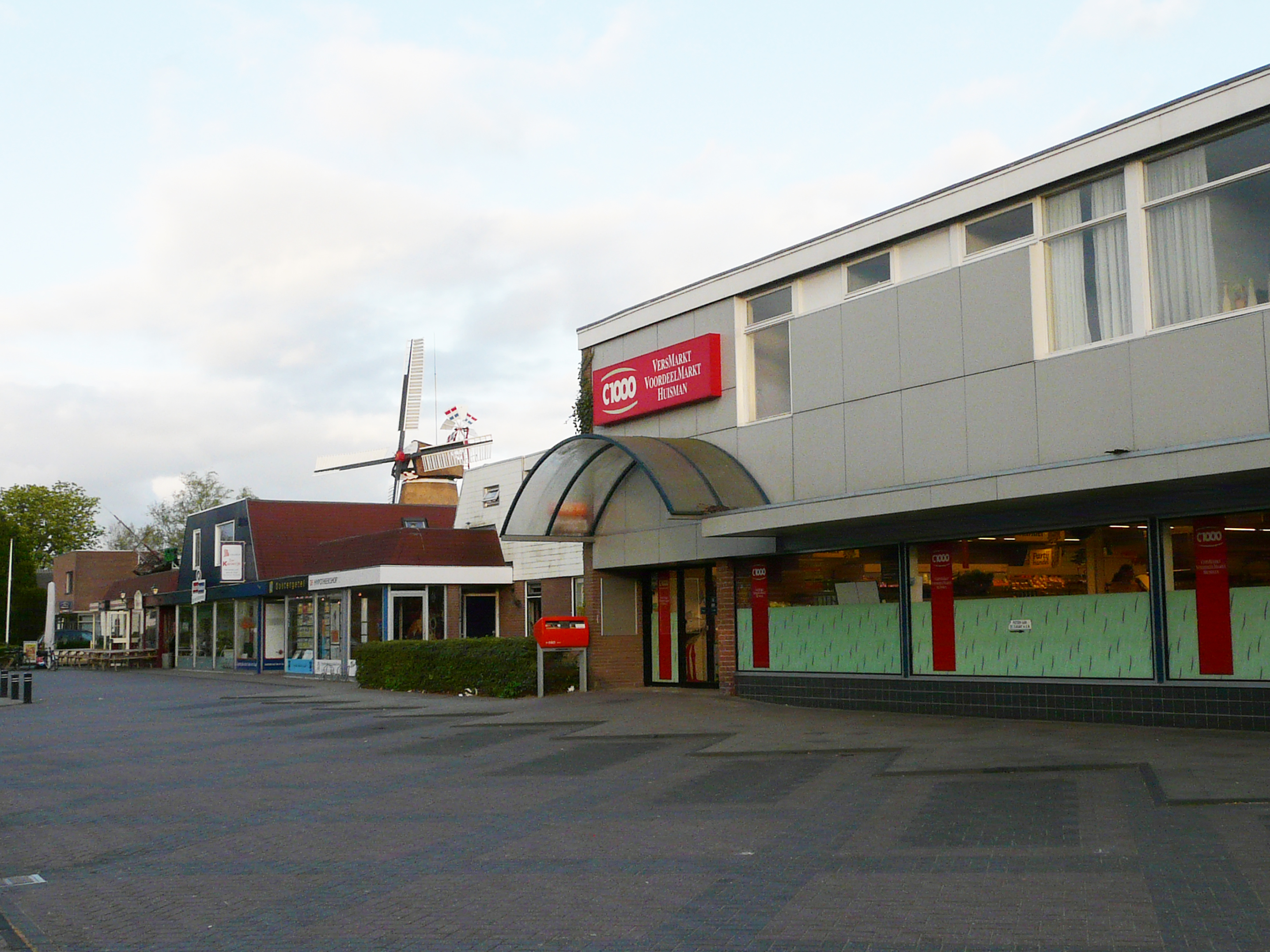
Village centre

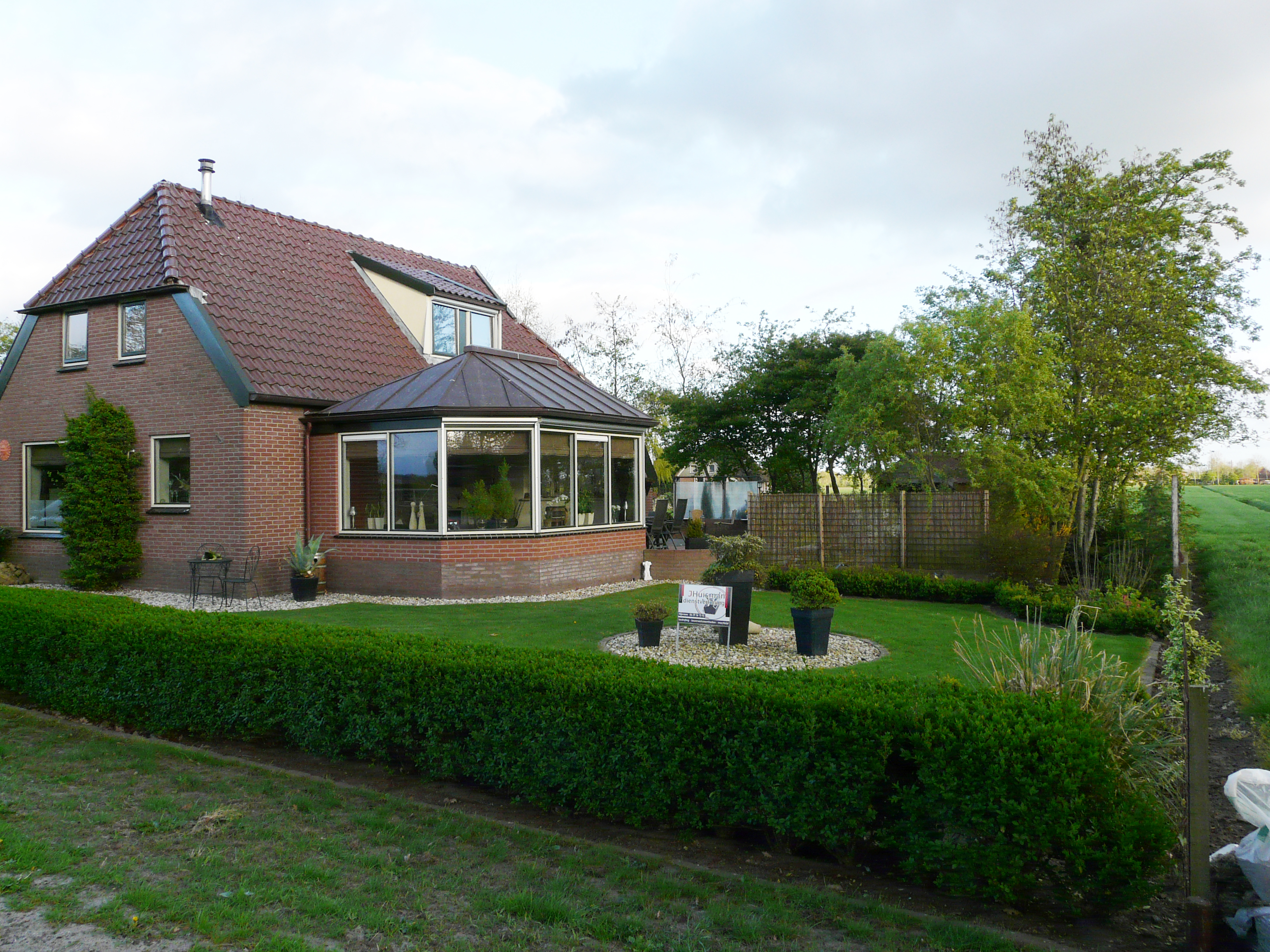
House in Nijeveen
