= International Korfball Federation =

International sport governing body

- Abbreviation: IKF
- Formation: 11 June 1933; 93 years ago
- Type: Federation of national associations
- Headquarters: Utrecht, The Netherlands
- Region served: Worldwide
- Members: 72 national associations (June 2024)
- Official languages: English
- President: Gabi Kool
- Senior Vice-President: Jorge Alves
- Secretary General: Joana Faria
- Main organ: IKF Executive Committee
- Affiliations: Global Association of International Sports Federations, ARISF, IWGA
- Website: Korfball.sport

The International Korfball Federation (IKF) is the governing body of korfball. IKF is responsible for the organisation of korfball's major international tournaments, notably the IKF World Korfball Championship.

The IKF was founded on 11 June 1933 in Antwerp, Belgium as a continuation of the International Korfball Bureau established in 1924 by the Dutch and Belgian Associations. The headquarters is in Utrecht, Netherlands, since December 2020, moving from Zeist.

The IKF is officially recognized by the International Olympic Committee (IOC) in 1993 and is affiliated to SportAccord, the Association of the IOC Recognized International Sports Federations (ARISF) and the International World Games Association (IWGA).

The IKF aims to spread korfball around the globe and increase the level of play in the affiliated countries. The IKF has 69 member countries. It provides the affiliated countries via five Continental Confederations (Africa, Americas, Asia, Europe and Oceania) with financial, material and structural support to achieve the goals. It has established a network of contacts in many countries and is constantly expanding this network. IKF actively promotes the game by transferring knowledge internationally by exchange programs and inviting selected korfball players, coaches and administrators to its training courses in order to assist in the creation of a stable local organization and structure in all the affiliated countries.

In response to the 2022 Russian invasion of Ukraine, on 1 March 2022, the International Korfball Federation announced that the Russian Korfball Federation would not be invited until further notice to any international korfball competition. This implied effectively that no Russian athletes shall take part in any international korfball event. Furthermore, the Russian Korfball Federation shall not be eligible to bid for the hosting of any IKF event until further notice, and no IKF events were planned in Russia.

== History ==
The first international event was held in 1963.

=== 1903-1973 ===
From 1903 to 1973 no world championship was held because of shortage of teams. In 70 years, the number of korfball nations increased from 1 to 5.

From 1903 to 1963, only some friendly matches took place between Belgium and the Netherlands.

The Netherlands, Belgium, and the United Kingdom had their first IKF match series in 1963. In 1974 the 10th (last) Triangular Trophy Tournament was held in London.

The first European Cup tournament took place in 1967.

Germany in 1964 and Spain in 1973 were added to the korfball nations.

=== 1973-1990 ===
Teams increased from 5 to 12 European nations and 14 other non european teams joined the federation.

=== 1990-1994 ===
31 nations.

== Results History ==
1. World Games:
2. World Championship:
3. Euro Clubs:
4. Euro Championship:
5. Asia - Pacific:
6. U23, U21, U19 World and Euro Championship:
7. U17 World Cup:

== Structure ==
1. Asian Korfball Federation
2. African Korfball Federation
3. Pan American Korfball Federation
4. European Korfball Federation

The IKF has 72 members at the moment. They are divided over five continental confederations for Europe, Asia, Americas, Africa and Oceanian.

=== First Members ===
1. Netherlands 1933
2. Belgium 1933
3. England 1946
4. Germany 1964
5. Luxembourg 1976
6. United States 1978
7. Australia 1978
8. India 1980
9. France 1982
10. Aruba 1982

=== Members by Regions ===
As of 16 January 2026

75 Members:

Number	Region	Countries
1	Africa	15
2	Asia	15
3	Oceania	2
4	Europe	30
5	Americas	13
Total	World	75

== Presidents ==
The IKF has had seven presidents until now. All seven have been from the Netherlands.

Start	End	Name	Nationality
1933	1946	Nico Broekhuijsen	Netherlands
1946	1954	S.A. Wilson	Netherlands
1954	1964	H.J. Venema	Netherlands
1964	1981	Herman Duns	Netherlands
1981	1988	Jo Roosenschoon	Netherlands
1988	2003	Bob de Die	Netherlands
2003	2023	Jan Fransoo	Netherlands
2023		Gabi Kool	Netherlands

== Council ==
The Council of the IKF consists of a President, a Secretary General, a Senior Vice-president, three other members of the executive committee and up to five Continental Vice-presidents.

Council Member	Position	Country
Gabi Kool	President	Netherlands
Joana Faria	Secretary General	Portugal
Jorge Alves	Senior Vice-president	Portugal
Bjorn Elewaut	Executive Committee Member	Belgium
Dean Woods	Special Delegate for Competitions	England
Anita Derks	Executive Committee Member	Netherlands
Björn Elewaut	Executive Committee Member	Belgium
Vacancy	Continental Vice-president, Africa	(African Union) Africa
Ying-Che Huang	Continental Vice-president, Asia	(Taiwan) Chinese Taipei
Tim Miller	Continental Vice-president, Oceania	Australia
Yves Daelmans	Continental Vice-president, Europe	Belgium

== IKF structured tournaments ==
=== Gap ===
IKF was founded in 1933 but first events was held in 1978. 45 years gap because of shortage teams in world (1 to 5 teams).

=== Olympics ===
- Korfball at the 1920 Summer Olympics
- Korfball at the 1928 Summer Olympics

=== Types ===
1. Senior
2. U23
3. U21
4. U19
5. U17
6. University
7. Beach

=== Sex ===
Only Mixed and no events for men and women.

=== National team tournaments ===
- IKF World Korfball Championship
- IKF European Korfball Championship
- IKF Europa Korfball Bowl
- IKF Pan American Korfball Championship
- IKF Asian Oceanian Korfball Championship
- IKF African Korfball Championship
- Korfball at the World Games

=== Club tournaments ===
- Korfball Champions League (KCL)
- IKF Europa Korfball Cup (replaced by KCL)
- IKF Europa Korfball Shield (replaced by KCL)

=== National youth team tournaments ===
- IKF U23 World Korfball Championship
- IKF U23 Pan American Korfball Championship
- IKF U23 Asian Oceanian Korfball Championship
- IKF U21 World Korfball Championship
- IKF U21 European Korfball Championship
- IKF U19 Korfball World Cup
- IKF U17 Korfball World Cup

=== University tournaments ===
- IKF University World Korfball Cup https://nl.wikipedia.org/wiki/University_World_Cup_(korfbal)
- IKF University Asian Korfball Championship
- IKF University European Korfball Championship European University Championship Korfball (EUCK) https://nl.wikipedia.org/wiki/European_University_Championship_Korfball

=== Beach Korfball tournaments ===
- IKF World Beach Korfball Championship https://nl.wikipedia.org/wiki/Wereldkampioenschap_beachkorfbal

== See also ==
- List of national korfball associations
- IKF World Korfball Ranking
- Netball
- Ringball
