= CKV Dalto =

- Leagues: Korfbal League 2 (indoor), Ereklasse (outdoor)
- Founded: 1 April 1953; 71 years ago
- Arena: Hoenderdaal
- Location: Driebergen, Netherlands
- Team colors: Yellow and Black

CKV Dalto (Christelijke Korfbalvereniging De Aanval Leidt Tot Overwinning) is a Dutch korfball club located in Driebergen, Netherlands. The club was founded on 1 April 1953 and plays its home games in sport accommodation Hoenderdaal. The team plays yellow shirts and black shorts / skirts.

== History ==
Dalto has been a founding member of Korfbal League and was relegated for the first time in season 2015/2016.

== Squad as of 2022-2023 ==
Men	Nationality	Shirt number	Women	Nationality	Shirt number
Thijs van de Griendt	Netherlands	2	Lotte Keuning	Netherlands	1
Rene Siedsma	Netherlands	4	Fenna Cavelaars	Netherlands	3
Rudo Schulting	Netherlands	6	Robin van der Vliet	Netherlands	5
Casper Zoontjes	Netherlands	8	Lotte Steenbergen	Netherlands	7
Kjell Jacobi	Netherlands	10	Lotte van Montfort	Netherlands	9
Matthijs den Ouden	Netherlands	12	Quinty Stahli	Netherlands	11
Justin Straatman	Netherlands	14	Anne van de Griendt	Netherlands	15
Mats Rodenburg	Netherlands	16	Joni ter Hoeve	Netherlands	19
Joost Wattel	Netherlands	18	Karin van den Brink	Netherlands	21
Yannick Schild	Netherlands	20	Fleur Kroes	Netherlands	23
Kris Boere	Netherlands	22	Renske Wien	Netherlands	25
Twan van Huisstede	Netherlands	24
