= Papendrechtse Korfbalclub =

PKC (Papendrechtse Korfbal Club)
- Leagues: Korfbal League (indoor), Ereklasse(outdoor)
- Founded: 2 February 1935; 91 years ago
- Arena: PKC-Hal
- Location: Papendrecht, Netherlands
- Main sponsor: Vertom
- President: (Netherlands) Brigitte van Roon
- Head coach: (Netherlands) Barry Schep (Netherlands) Johannis Schot

PKC (Papendrechtse Korfbal Club) is a Dutch korfball club located in Papendrecht, Netherlands. The club was founded on 2 February 1935 and they play their home games in the PKC-Hal. The team plays in white shirts and green shorts / skirts. The club has around 1000 members, which makes it the biggest korfball club in the world.

== History ==
In 1971 PKC first joined the highest Dutch competition outdoors, the Hoofdklasse. Although they finished at 9th place in their first season in the top, they quickly moved towards being one of the top teams in the Netherlands. Their first national title came in season 1976-1977, when they won the Dutch outdoor title.

Their first success in the indoor-competition came in season 1979-1980, where they played their first outdoor final in club history. In this final they lost to Deetos.

Since the existence of the Korfbal League PKC has won the title five times, the last time being in 2024. In 2014 and 2016 PKC also won the IKF Europa Korfball Cup, later replaced by the Korfball Champions League (KCL) which they also won two times.

== Honours ==
- Dutch national champion indoor, 12x (1985, 1989, 1997, 1998, 1999, 2001, 2005, 2013, 2015, 2021, 2023, 2024, 2025)
- Dutch national champion outdoor, 18x (1977, 1979, 1980, 1981, 1984, 1987, 1988, 1989, 1993, 1995, 2003, 2004, 2005, 2006, 2016, 2018, 2022, 2023)
- Europacup champion indoor, 8x (1985, 1990, 1999, 2000, 2002, 2006, 2014, 2015)
- Europacup champion outdoor, 4x (1979, 1980, 1981 en 1985)
- Supercup champion outdoor, 3x (2016, 2018, 2022)
- Korfball Champions League, 4x (2023, 2024, 2025, 2026)
