= Koog Zaandijk =

- Leagues: Korfbal League
- Founded: 20 May 1910; 114 years ago (as TAVENU)
- Arena: De Sprong
- Location: Koog aan de Zaan, Netherlands
- President: (Netherlands) Corrie Noom
- Head coach: (Netherlands) Dennis Doves

Koog Zaandijk (Korfbalclub Koog-Zaandijk) or in common language KZ is a Dutch korfball club located in Koog aan de Zaan, Netherlands. The club was founded on 20 May 1910 as TAVENU (Tot Aangename Verpozing En Nuttige Uitspanning), but was already in some month changed to Koog Zaandijk. They play their home games in sports accommodation De Sprong. The team plays in black/blue vertically striped shirts and black shorts / skirts.

== History ==
Since the existence of the Korfbal League Koog Zaandijk has won the title three times in 2008, 2010 and 2012.

== Honours ==
- Dutch national champion indoor, 3x (2008, 2010, 2012)
- Dutch national champion outdoor, 2x (1934, 2014)
- Europacup champion indoor, 3x (2009, 2011, 2013)
- Supercup champion outdoor, 1x (2014)
