= DOS '46 =

- Leagues: Korfbal League
- Founded: 22 May 1946; 78 years ago
- Arena: Sporthal de Eendracht
- Location: Nijeveen, Netherlands
- President: Henk Jonker
- Head coach: Daniël Hulzebosch

DOS '46 (Door Oefening Sterk 1946) is a Dutch korfball club located in Nijeveen, Netherlands. The club was founded on 22 May 1946 and they play their home games in Sporthal de Eendracht. The team plays in red shirts and black shorts / skirts.

== History ==
The first historical moment for DOS '46 was winning the Dutch indoor title on 20 March 1982, after winning 10-8 against Deetos. In 2006, 2007 and 2009 the title is won in the Korfbal League. In 1982, 2007, 2008 and 2010 the club also wins the IKF Europa Korfball Cup.

== Current squad ==
Squad for the 2015-16 season - Updated: 1 April 2016

Women

- 11 (Netherlands) Iris Hulzebosch
- 12 (Netherlands) Geertje Hoekstra
- 13 (Netherlands) Maaike Steenbergen
- 14 (Netherlands) Rosemiek Harrewijn
- 15 (Netherlands) Nynke Sinnema
- 16 (Netherlands) Nienke Hintzbergen
- 17 (Netherlands) Marieke Klaver
- 19 (Netherlands) Loes Blacquiere
- 20 (Netherlands) Lisanne Koster
- 24 (Netherlands) Fenna de Jong

Men

- 1 (Netherlands) Marco Zegwaard
- 2 (Netherlands) Sven Jonker
- 4 (Netherlands) Leander Zwolle
- 5 (Netherlands) Max Malestein
- 6 (Netherlands) Jelmer Jonker
- 7 (Netherlands) Jeffrey van Doeselaar
- 8 (Netherlands) Jesse de Jong
- 9 (Netherlands) Harjan Visscher
- 10 (Netherlands) Rick Wessel
- 22 (Netherlands) Bastiaan Nijmeijer
