= CKV DVO =

DVO
- Leagues: Korfbal League (indoor), Ereklasse(outdoor)
- Founded: 1946; 79 years ago
- Arena: DVO/Transus-hal
- Location: Bennekom, Netherlands
- Main sponsor: Transus
- President: Erik van Buren
- Head coach: Richard van Vloten & Marc Verberk

CKV DVO/Transus (christelijke korfbal vereninging Door Vriendschap Omhoog) is a Dutch korfball club located in Bennekom, Netherlands. The club was founded in 1946 and they play their home games in the DVO/Transus-hal. The team plays in green shirts and white shorts / skirts.

== History ==
DVO joined the Korfbal League in the 2010/11 season and has been represented in the top division since then. In 2015 Chinese Taipei international Alice Huang joined the team from Bennekom, but that was not a success. She ended in the second team.

In 2024, during the outdoor season, DVO won its first championship title in the club′s history.

== Honours ==
- Dutch national champion outdoor, 1x (2024)

== Current squad ==
Squad for the 2015-16 season - Updated: 1 April 2016

Women

- 1 (Netherlands) Lisanne van Veldhuisen
- 2 (Netherlands) Fleur Hoek
- 3 (Netherlands) Miriam Swart
- 5 (Netherlands) Romy Theunissen
- 14 (Netherlands) Lois Bakker
- 15 (Netherlands) Saskia van der Zee
- 17 (Netherlands) Hester Heitink
- 17 (Netherlands) Janine van Schie
- 18 (Netherlands) Jamilla Vervoort

Men

- 7 (Netherlands) Chris van Haren
- 11 (Netherlands) Thijs de Nooij
- 12 (Netherlands) Jeroen Jansen
- 19 (Netherlands) Marijn van den Goorbergh
- 20 (Netherlands) Tim Danen
- 22 (Netherlands) Bob Gerritsen
- 23 (Netherlands) Brent Struyf
- 24 (Netherlands) Dennis Brunt
