= TOP Sassenheim =

- Leagues: Korfbal League 2 (indoor), Ereklasse (outdoor)
- Founded: 12 July 1928; 96 years ago
- Arena: De Korf
- Location: Sassenheim, Netherlands
- President: Ruud Westerbeek
- Head coach: Leon Braunstahl

Korfbalvereniging Tot Ons Plezier (KV TOP), usually known as TOP Sassenheim, is a Dutch korfball club located in Sassenheim, Netherlands. The club was founded on 12 July 1928 and they play their home games in sports accommodation De Korf. The team plays in white/red vertically striped shirts and black shorts / skirts.

== History ==
During the nineties TOP made small steps to enter the elite korfball competition. When in 2005 a new elite indoor competition was founded, the Korfbal League it took them 3 years to take part of this. Once the club entered this competition in 2008, they quickly emerged to the top, winning titles in 2011, 2014, 2016, 2017 and 2018.

At the end of the 2021-22 Korfball League season the team relegated to Korfbal League 2.

== Honours ==
- Dutch national champion indoor, 2x (2011 en 2015)
- Dutch national champion outdoor, 5x (2011, 2014, 2016, 2017, 2018)
- Europacup champion indoor, 5x (2012, 2015, 2017, 2018, 2019)
- Supercup champion outdoor, 1x (2015)
