= AKC Blauw-Wit =

- Leagues: Korfbal League
- Founded: 6 December 1916; 108 years ago (as GOKC)
- Arena: Blauw-Wit Hal
- Location: Amsterdam, Netherlands
- President: (Netherlands) Tonny Verwoert
- Head coach: (Netherlands) Erik van Brenk
- Website: akcblauwwit.nl

AKC Blauw-Wit (Amsterdamse Korfbal Club Blauw-Wit) is a Dutch korfball club located in Amsterdam, Netherlands. The club was founded on 6 December 1916 under the name of GOKC (Geheel Onthouders Korfbal Club) and they play their games in the Blauw-Wit Hal. The team plays in white/blue horizontally striped shirts and black shorts / skirts.

== History ==
Since the existence of the Korfbal League Blauw-Wit has been represented in the top division. Blauw-Wit reached the play-off stages 5 times in 2012, 2013, 2015, 2016 and 2017 but only in 2017 they reached to the final. Blauw-Wit is the only club from the capital to play in the highest korfball division.

== Honours ==
- Dutch national champion outdoor, 14x (1933, 1936, 1937, 1938, 1949, 1953, 1954, 1964, 1968, 1969, 2001, 2010, 2013, 2017)
- Dutch national champion indoor, 3x (1969, 1979, 1980)
- Europacup champion outdoor, 2x (1968, 1969)
- Supercup champion outdoor, 2x (2013, 2017)
