= Korfbal League =

Sports league in the Netherlands

- Current season, competition or edition: 2025–26 Korfbal League
- Sport: Korfball
- Founded: 2005; 21 years ago
- First season: 2005–06
- Administrator: KNKV
- No. of teams: 10
- Country: Netherlands
- Confederation: IKF Europe
- Most recent champion: PKC (6th title) (2024–25)
- Most titles: PKC (6 titles)
- Broadcasters: Eyecons.com(livestreams); NOS (highlights)
- Sponsor: Kenonz
- Level on pyramid: 1
- Relegation to: Korfbal League 2
- International cup: Korfball Champions League

The Korfbal League is the highest echelon of indoor korfball in the Netherlands. The league was founded in 2005 as the new highest level in Dutch korfball. Before that the top level was split in two divisions. Since the start of the competition the format has been the same. The winner of the Korfbal League qualifies for the Korfball Champions League while the number 10 relegated to the Korfbal League 2. The number 9 will compete with the loser of the Korfbal League 2 final in a play-off for a position in the Korfbal League.

== History ==
The Royal Dutch Korfball Association started the Korfbal League in 2005 to make top level korfball more attractive for the public. This was done by fusing the former two divisions into one. But also by introducing new rules to improve the speed of the game, the most notable of the changes was the introduction of the Shot clock. Further branding was done by introducing a clear logo, a new website and more representative sports clothing.

The first edition of the league in 2005/2006 was won by DOS'46.

== Champions ==
Season	Champions	Runners-up
2005–06	DOS'46	Dalto
2006–07	DOS'46	PKC
2007–08	KZ	DOS'46
2008–09	DOS'46	KZ
2009–10	KZ	Dalto
2010–11	TOP	PKC
2011–12	KZ	PKC
2012–13	PKC	Fortuna
2013–14	TOP	PKC
2014–15	PKC	TOP
2015–16	TOP	PKC
2016–17	TOP	Blauw-Wit
2017–18	TOP	Fortuna
2018–19	Fortuna	PKC
2019–20	Cancelled	
2020–21	PKC	Fortuna
2021–22	Fortuna	PKC
2022–23	PKC	DVO
2023–24	PKC	DVO
2024–25	PKC	Fortuna
2025–26	DVO	Fortuna

== Team statistics ==
=== Titles by club ===
Rank	Club	Titles	Runner-up	Champion years
1	PKC	6	7	2012-13, 2014-15, 2020-21, 2022-23, 2023-24, 2024-25
2	TOP	5	1	2010-11, 2013-14, 2015-16, 2016-17, 2017-18
3	DOS'46	3	1	2005-06, 2006-07, 2008-09
4	KZ	3	1	2007-08, 2009-10, 2011-12
5	Fortuna	2	5	2018-19, 2021-22
6	DVO	1	2	2025-26
7	Dalto	0	2	
8	Blauw-Wit	0	1	
