= Maegō Station =

Railway station in Yurihonjō, Akita Prefecture, Japan

Maegō Station 前郷駅
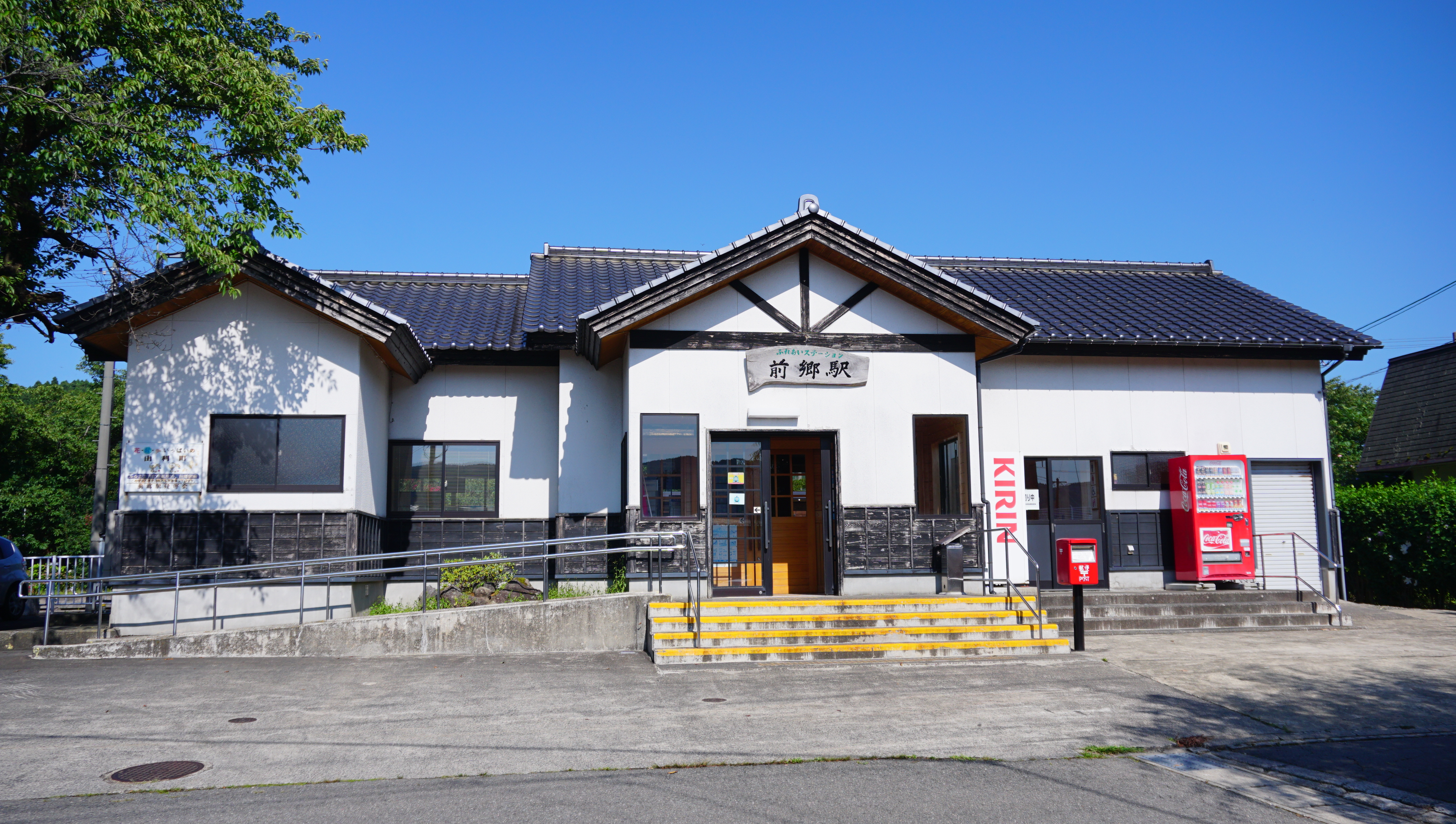
- Maegō Station, August 2020

General information
- Location: Maegō, Yurihonjō-shi, Akita-ken; Japan
- Coordinates: 39°18′45.52″N 140°06′45.90″E
- Operator: Yuri Kōgen Railway
- Line: ■ Yuri Kōgen Railway Chōkai Sanroku Line
- Distance: 11.7 km from Ugo-Honjō
- Platforms: 2 side platforms

Other information
- Status: Unstaffed

History
- Opened: August 1, 1922

Passengers
- FY2018: 161
Location
- Location within Akita Prefecture Location within Japan

Maegō Station (前郷駅, Maegō-eki) is a railway station in the city of Yurihonjō, Akita Prefecture, Japan, operated by the third-sector railway operator Yuri Kōgen Railway.

== Lines ==
Maegō Station is served by the Chōkai Sanroku Line, and is located 11.7 kilometers from the terminus of the line at Ugo-Honjō Station.

== Station layout ==
The station has two opposed side platforms. The station is unattended.

=== Platforms ===
1	■ Chōkai Sanroku Line	for Ugo-Honjō
2	■ Chōkai Sanroku Line	for Yashima

== Adjacent stations ==
«	Service	»
Yuri Kōgen Railway Chōkai Sanroku Line
Magarisawa	Local	Kubota

== History ==
Maegō Station opened on August 1, 1922, as a station on the Yokojō Railway, which became the Japanese Government Railways (JGR) Yashima Line on September 1, 1937. The line was extended past Maegō to Nishitakizawa Station in December of the same year. The JGR became the Japan National Railway (JNR) after World War II. The Yashima Line was privatized on 1 October 1985, becoming the Yuri Kōgen Railway Chōkai Sanroku Line. A new station building was completed in December 2003.

== Surrounding area ==
- National Route 108

== See also ==
- List of railway stations in Japan
