= Nishitakisawa Station =

Railway station in Yurihonjō, Akita Prefecture, Japan

Nishitakisawa Station 西滝沢駅
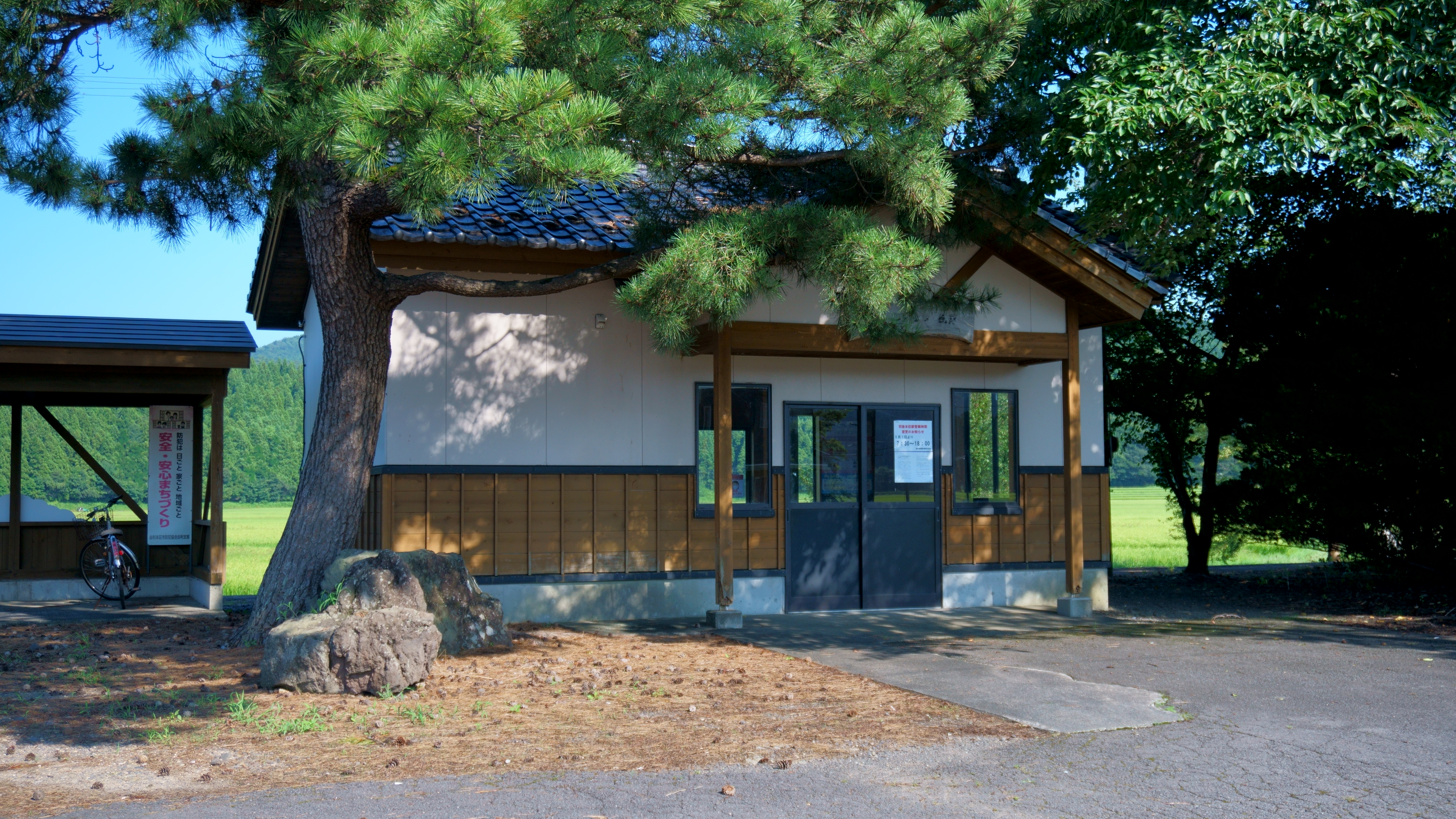
- Nishitakisawa Station, August 2020

General information
- Location: Kanizawa, Yurihonjō-shi, Akita-ken; Japan
- Coordinates: 39°16′41.79″N 140°06′59.07″E
- Operator: Yuri Kōgen Railway
- Line: ■ Yuri Kōgen Railway Chōkai Sanroku Line
- Distance: 15.7 km from Ugo-Honjō
- Platforms: 1 side platform

Other information
- Status: Unstaffed

History
- Opened: September 1, 1937

Passengers
- FY2018: 63
Location
- Location within Akita Prefecture Location within Japan

Nishitakisawa Station (西滝沢駅, Nishitakisawa-eki) is a railway station in the city of Yurihonjō, Akita Prefecture, Japan, operated by the third-sector railway operator Yuri Kōgen Railway.

== Lines ==
Nishitakisawa Station is served by the Chōkai Sanroku Line, and is located 15.7 kilometers from the terminus of the line at Ugo-Honjō Station.

== Station layout ==
The station has one side platform, serving a single bi-directional track. The station is unattended.

== Adjacent stations ==
«	Service	»
Yuri Kōgen Railway Chōkai Sanroku Line
Kubota	Local	Yoshizawa

== History ==
Nishitakisawa Station opened on December 15, 1937 as a station on the Japanese Government Railways (JGR) Yashima Line. The JGR became the Japan National Railway (JNR) after World War II. All freight operations were discontinued from June 10, 1981. The Yashima Line was privatized on 1 October 1985, becoming the Yuri Kōgen Railway Chōkai Sanroku Line. A new station building was completed in December 2003.

== Surrounding area ==
- National Route 108

== See also ==
- List of railway stations in Japan
