= Magarisawa Station =

Railway station in Yurihonjō, Akita Prefecture, Japan

Magarisawa Station 曲沢駅
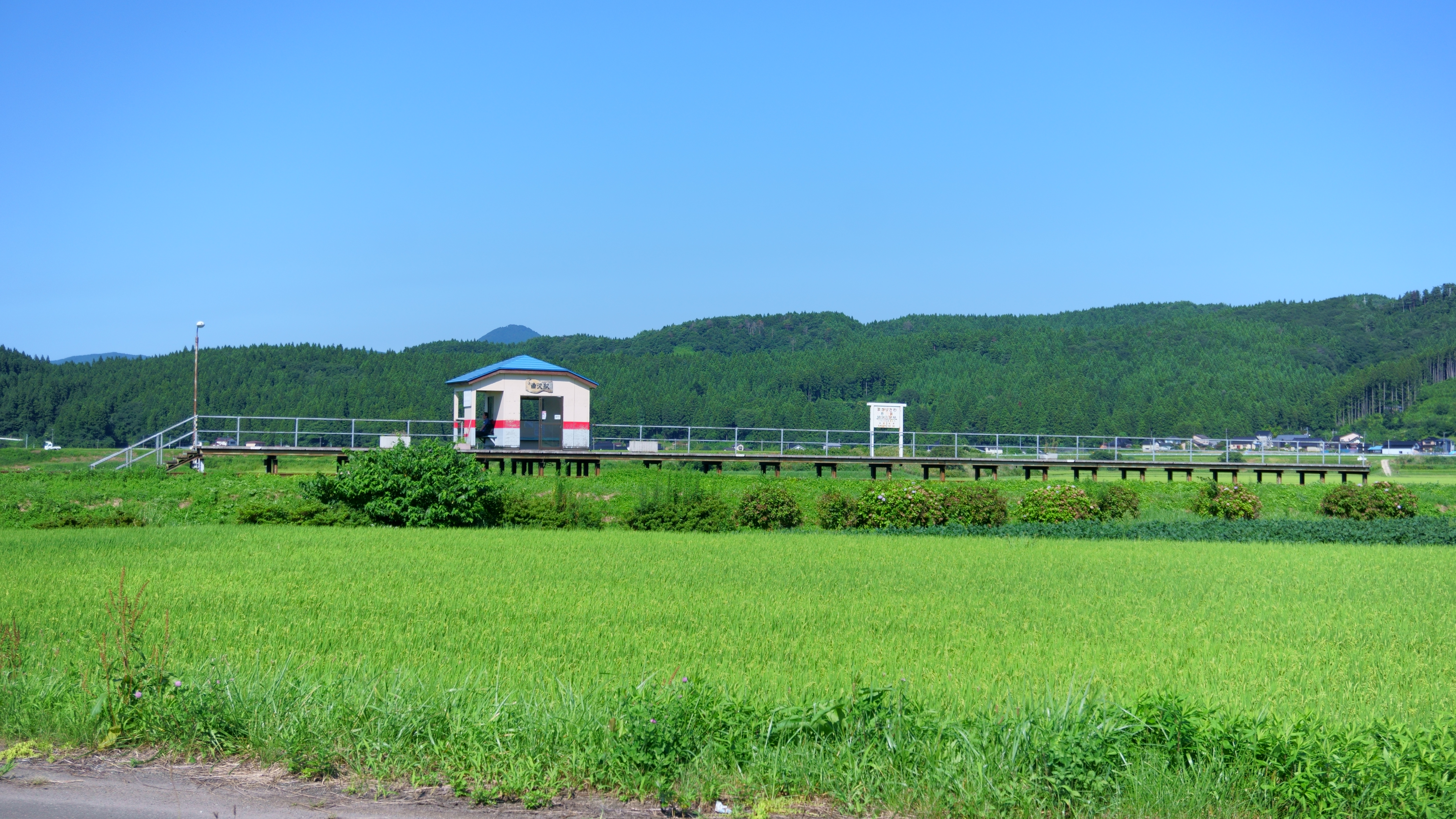
- Magarisawa Station, August 2020

General information
- Location: Maegō, Yurihonjō-shi, Akita-ken; Japan
- Coordinates: 39°19′15.69″N 140°06′7.85″E
- Operator: Yuri Kōgen Railway
- Line: ■ Yuri Kōgen Railway Chōkai Sanroku Line
- Distance: 10.3 km from Ugo-Honjō
- Platforms: 1 side platform

Other information
- Status: Unstaffed

History
- Opened: October 29, 1989

Passengers
- FY2018: 1
Location
- Location within Akita Prefecture Location within Japan

Magarisawa Station (曲沢駅, Magarisawa-eki) is a railway station in the city of Yurihonjō, Akita Prefecture, Japan, operated by the third-sector railway operator Yuri Kōgen Railway.

== Lines ==
Magarisawa Station is served by the Chōkai Sanroku Line, and is located 10.3 kilometers from the terminus of the line at Ugo-Honjō Station.

== Station layout ==
The station has one side platform, serving a single bi-directional track. The station is unattended.

== Adjacent stations ==
«	Service	»
Yuri Kōgen Railway Chōkai Sanroku Line
Kurosawa	Local	Maegō

== History ==
Magarisawa Station opened on October 29, 1989.

== Surrounding area ==
- National Route 108

== See also ==
- List of railway stations in Japan
