= Nishime =

Nishime may refer to:

- Nishime (surname)
- Nishime, Akita, a former town in Yuri District, Akita Prefecture, Japan
- Nishime Station, a railway station in Yurihonjō, Akita Prefecture, Japan
- Nimono, nishime being a specific form of nimono in Japanese cuisine
