= Ayukawa Station =

Railway station in Yurihonjō, Akita Prefecture, Japan

Ayukawa Station 鮎川駅
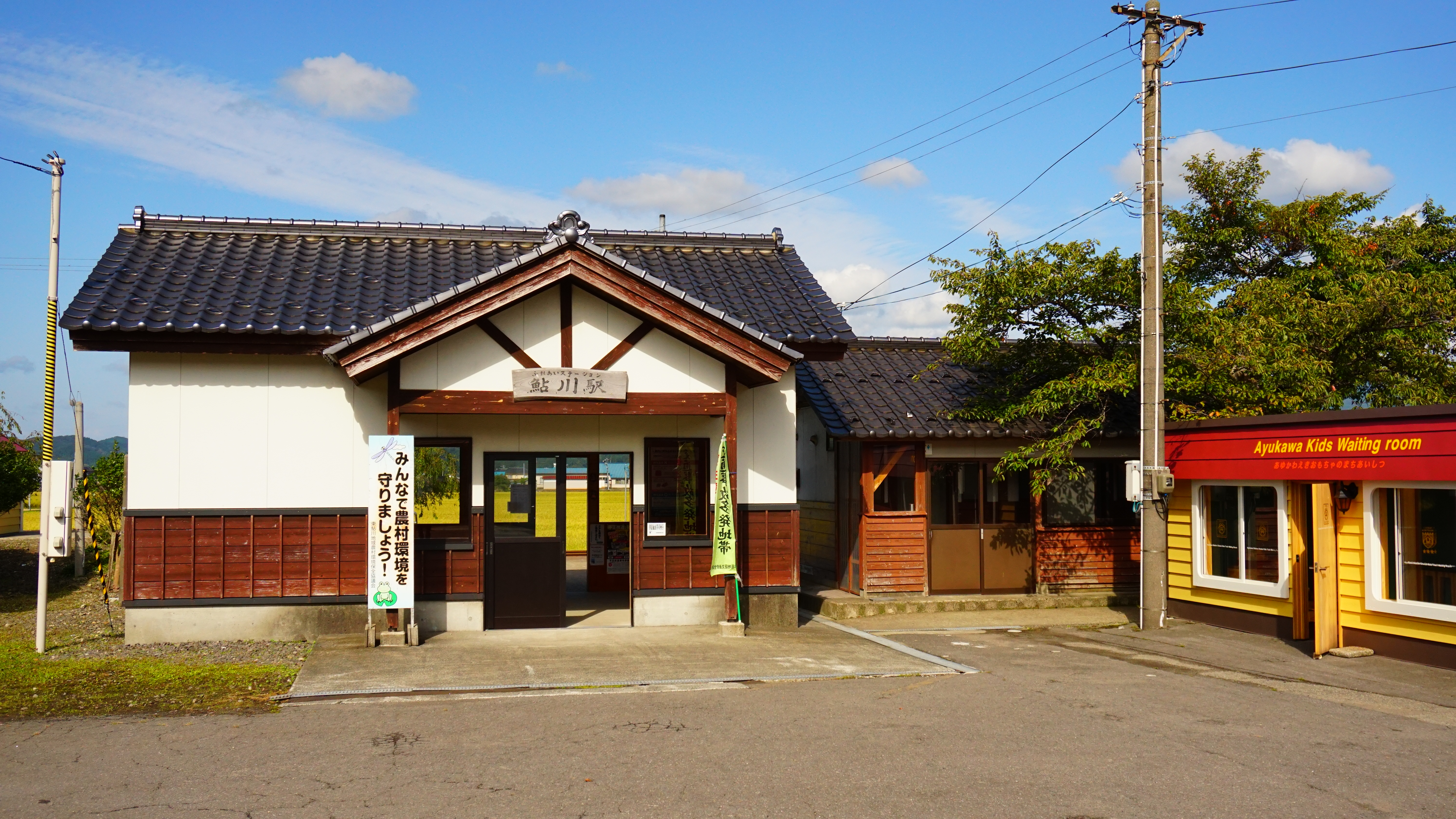
- Ayukawa Station, September 2018

General information
- Location: Higashi Ayukawa, Yurihonjō-shi, Akita-ken 015-0362; Japan
- Coordinates: 39°19′42.06″N 140°04′17.96″E
- Operator: Yuri Kōgen Railway
- Line: ■ Yuri Kōgen Railway Chōkai Sanroku Line
- Distance: 7.4 km from Ugo-Honjō
- Platforms: 1 side platform

Other information
- Status: Unstaffed

History
- Opened: August 1, 1922
- Former names: Ugo-Ayukawa (1937-1985)

Passengers
- FY2018: 44
Location
- Location within Akita Prefecture Location within Japan

Ayukawa Station (鮎川駅, Ayukawa -eki) is a railway station in the city of Yurihonjō, Akita Prefecture, Japan, operated by the third-sector railway operator Yuri Kōgen Railway.

== Lines ==
Ayukawa Station is served by the Chōkai Sanroku Line, and is located 7.4 kilometers from the terminus of the line at Ugo-Honjō Station.

== Station layout ==
The station has one side platform, serving one bi-directional track. The station is unattended.

== Adjacent stations ==
«	Service	»
Yuri Kōgen Railway Chōkai Sanroku Line
Koyoshi	Local	Kurosawa

== History ==
Ayukawa Station opened on August 1, 1922, as a station on the Yokojō Railway, which became the Japanese Government Railways (JGR) Yashima Line on September 1, 1937. On that date, it was renamed Ugo-Ayukawa Station (羽後鮎川駅). The JGR became the Japan National Railway (JNR) after World War II. The Yashima Line was privatized on 1 October 1985, becoming the Yuri Kōgen Railway Chōkai Sanroku Line, at which time the station reassumed its original name. A new station building was completed in December 2003.

== Surrounding area ==
- National Route 108

== See also ==
- List of railway stations in Japan
