= Kurosawa Station (Yurihonjō) =

Railway station in Yurihonjō, Akita Prefecture, Japan

Kurosawa Station 黒沢駅
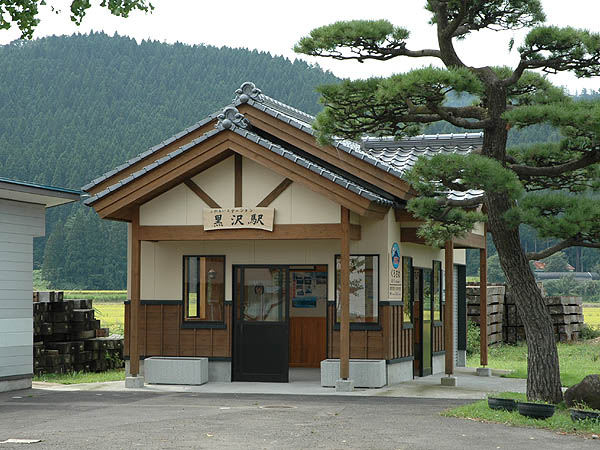
- Kurosawa Station, September 2005

General information
- Location: Kurosawa, Yurihonjō-shi, Akita-ken 015-0361; Japan
- Coordinates: 39°19′13.29″N 140°05′36.23″E
- Operator: Yuri Kōgen Railway
- Line: ■ Yuri Kōgen Railway Chōkai Sanroku Line
- Distance: 9.5 km from Ugo-Honjō
- Platforms: 1 side platform

Other information
- Status: Unstaffed

History
- Opened: September 1, 1937
- Former names: Ugo-Kurosawa (until 1985)

Passengers
- FY2018: 12
Location
- Location within Akita Prefecture Location within Japan

Kurosawa Station (黒沢駅, Kurosawa-eki) is a railway station in the city of Yurihonjō, Akita Prefecture, Japan, operated by the third-sector railway operator Yuri Kōgen Railway.

== Lines ==
Kurosawa Station is served by the Chōkai Sanroku Line, and is located 9.5 kilometers from the terminus of the line at Ugo-Honjō Station.

== Station layout ==
The station has one side platform, serving one bi-directional track. The station is unattended.

== Adjacent stations ==
«	Service	»
Yuri Kōgen Railway Chōkai Sanroku Line
Ayukawa	Local	Magarisawa

== History ==
Kurosawa Station opened on August 1, 1922 as the Kurosawa Signal Stop (黒沢停留場) on the Yokojō Railway, which became the Japanese Government Railways (JGR) Yashima Line on September 1, 1937. On that date, it was elevated to a full station, named Ugo-Kurosawa Station (羽後黒沢駅). The JGR became the Japan National Railway (JNR) after World War II. The station has been unattended since October 1971. The Yashima Line was privatized on 1 October 1985, becoming the Yuri Kōgen Railway Chōkai Sanroku Line, at which time the station assumed its present name. A new station building was completed in December 2003.

== Surrounding area ==
- National Route 108

== See also ==
- List of railway stations in Japan
