= Yoshizawa Station =

Railway station in Yurihonjō, Akita Prefecture, Japan

Yoshizawa Station 吉沢駅
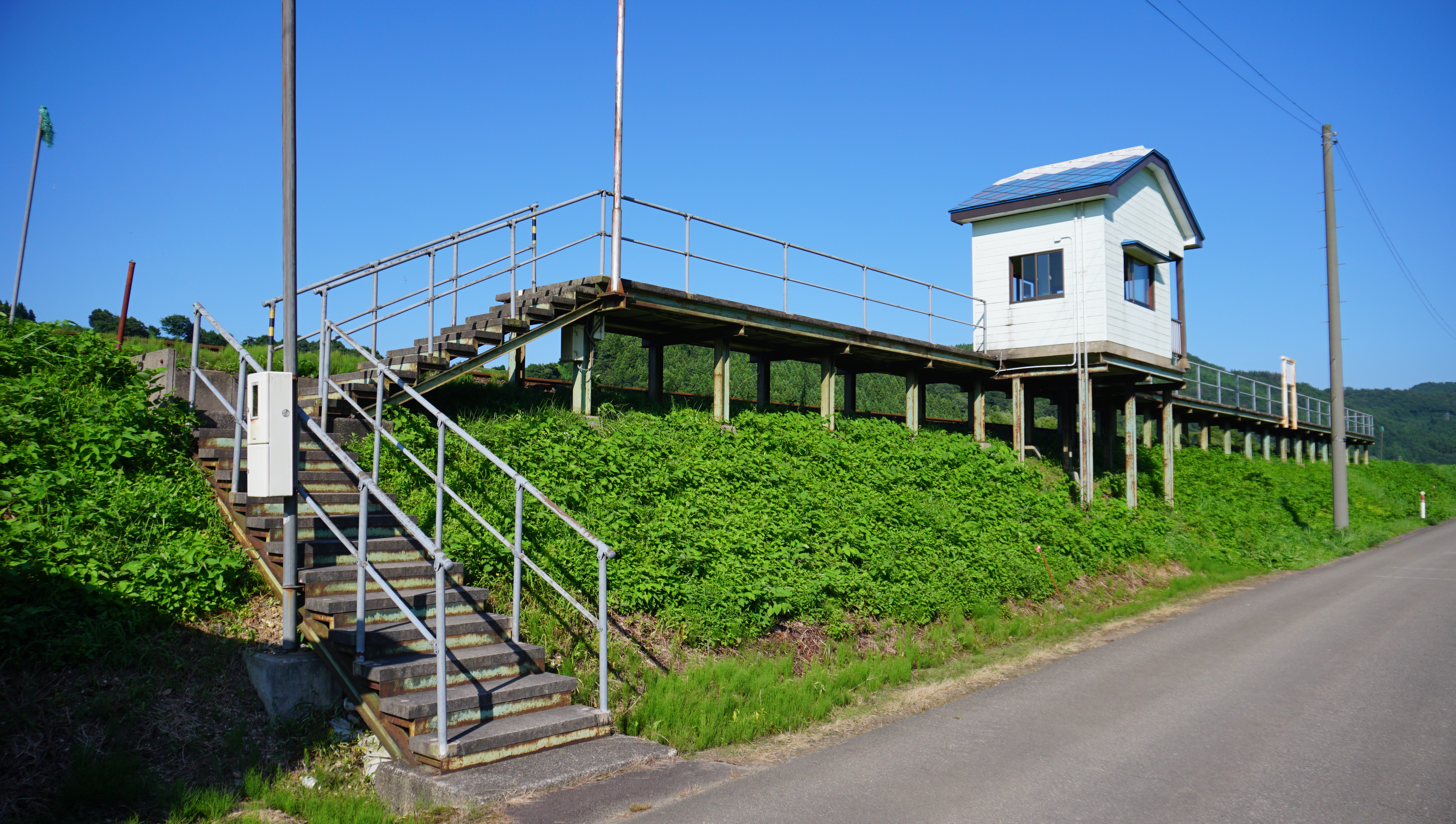
- Yoshizawa Station, August 2020

General information
- Location: Kanizawa, Yurihonjō-shi, Akita-ken 015-0324; Japan
- Coordinates: 39°16′41.79″N 140°06′59.07″E
- Operator: Yuri Kōgen Railway
- Line: ■ Yuri Kōgen Railway Chōkai Sanroku Line
- Distance: 17.1 km from Ugo-Honjō
- Platforms: 1 side platform

Other information
- Status: Unstaffed

History
- Opened: October 29, 1989

Passengers
- FY2018: 33
Location
- Location within Akita Prefecture Location within Japan

Yoshizawa Station (吉沢駅, Yoshizawa-eki) is a railway station in the city of Yurihonjō, Akita Prefecture, Japan, operated by the third-sector railway operator Yuri Kōgen Railway.

== Lines ==
Yoshizawa Station is served by the Chōkai Sanroku Line, and is located 17.1 kilometers from the terminus of the line at Ugo-Honjō Station.

== Station layout ==
The station has one side platform, serving one bi-directional track. The station is unattended.

== Adjacent stations ==
«	Service	»
Yuri Kōgen Railway Chōkai Sanroku Line
Nishitakisawa	Local	Kawabe

== History ==
Yoshizawa Station opened on October 29, 1989.

== Surrounding area ==
- National Route 108

== See also ==
- List of railway stations in Japan
