= Koyoshi Station =

Railway station in Yurihonjō, Akita Prefecture, Japan

Koyoshi Station 子吉駅
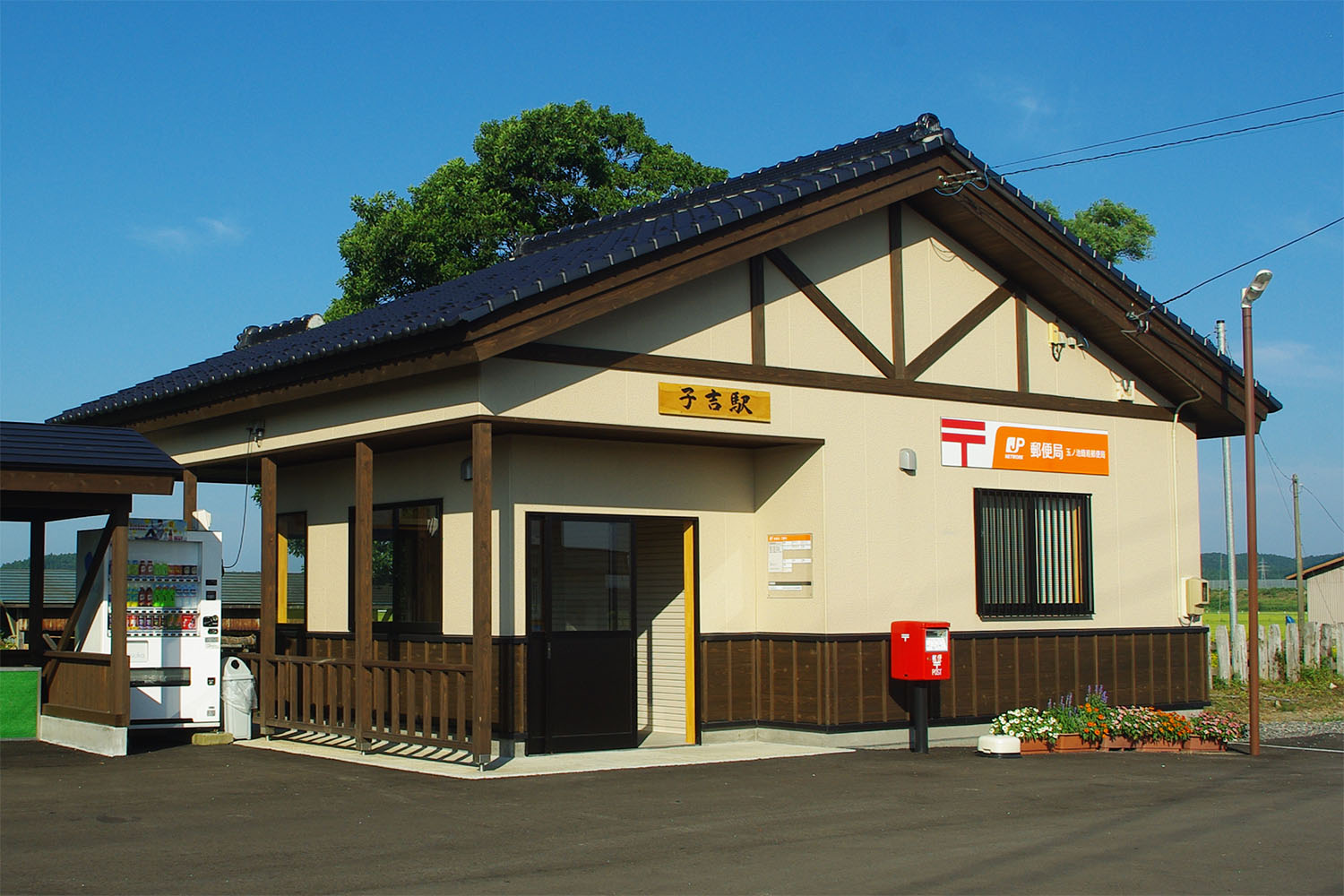
- Koyoshi Station, August 2012

General information
- Location: Otoshi-14-8 Tamanoike Yurihonjōshi, Akita-ken 015-0044; Japan
- Coordinates: 39°21′2.49″N 140°03′35.26″E
- Operator: Yuri Kōgen Railway
- Line: ■ Yuri Kōgen Railway Chōkai Sanroku Line
- Distance: 4.5 km from Ugo-Honjō
- Platforms: 1 side platform

Other information
- Status: Unstaffed

History
- Opened: August 1, 1922

Passengers
- FY2018: 16
Location
- Location within Akita Prefecture Location within Japan

Koyoshi Station (子吉駅, Koyoshi-eki) is a railway station in the city of Yurihonjō, Akita Prefecture, Japan, operated by the third-sector railway operator Yuri Kōgen Railway.

== Lines ==
Koyoshi Station is served by the Chōkai Sanroku Line, and is located 4.5 kilometers from the terminus of the line at Ugo-Honjō Station.

== Station layout ==
The station has one side platform, serving one bi-directional track. The station is unattended.

== Adjacent stations ==
«	Service	»
Yuri Kōgen Railway Chōkai Sanroku Line
Yakushidō	Local	Ayukawa

== History ==
Koyoshi Station opened on August 1, 1922 as the Tamanoike Signal Stop (玉ノ池停留場) on the Yokojō Railway. It was elevated to a full station and given its present name on October 24, 1926. The Yokojō Railway became the Japanese Government Railways (JGR) Yashima Line on September 1, 1937. The JGR became the Japan National Railway (JNR) after World War II. The Yashima Line was privatized on 1 October 1985, becoming the Yuri Kōgen Railway Chōkai Sanroku Line, at which time the station re-assumed its original name. A new station building was completed in December 2011.

== Surrounding area ==
- National Route 108

== See also ==
- List of railway stations in Japan
