= Kawabe Station (Akita) =

Railway station in Yurihonjō, Akita Prefecture, Japan

Kawabe Station 川辺駅
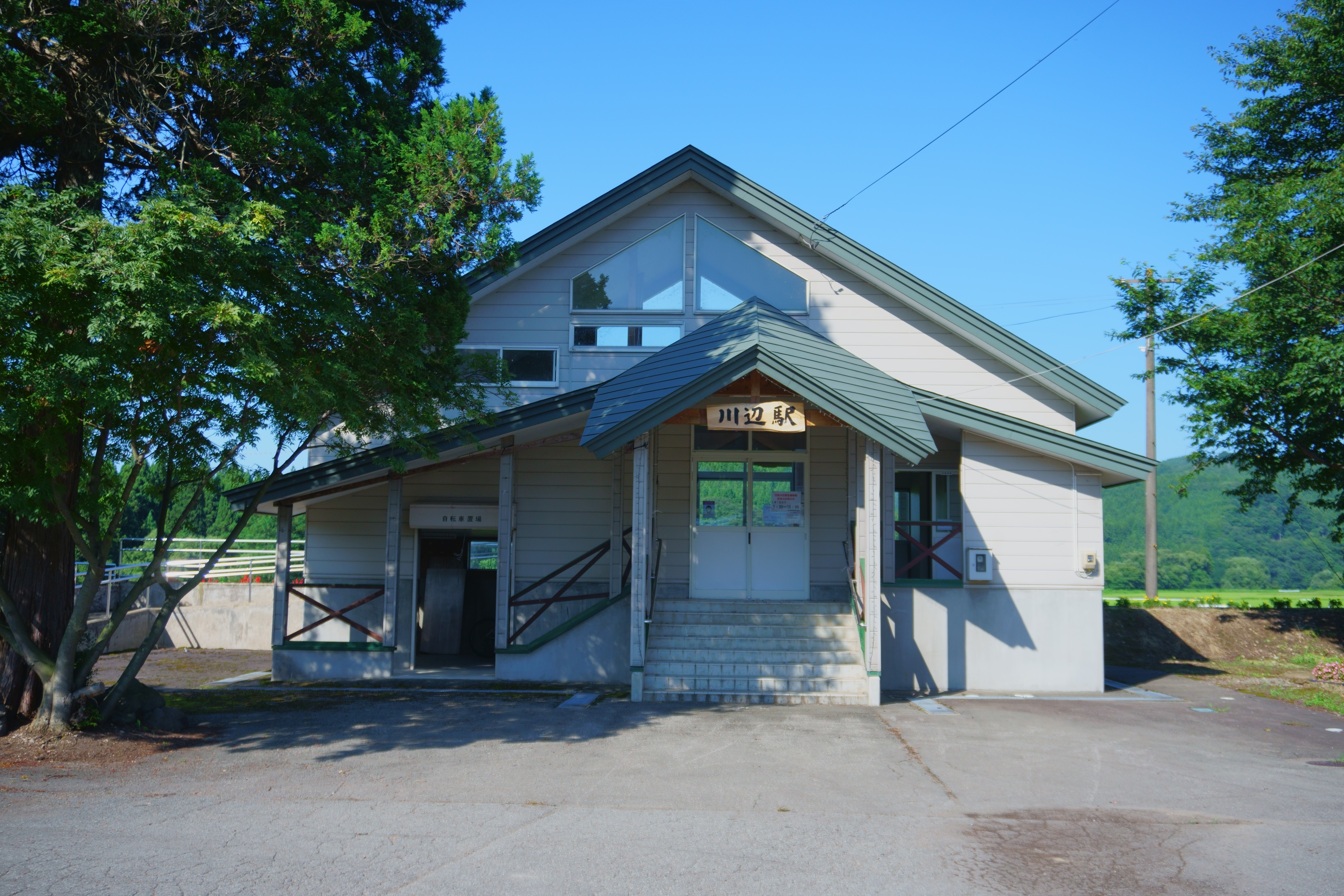
- Kawabe Station, August 2020

General information
- Location: Kawabe, Yurihonjō-shi, Akita-ken 015-0412; Japan
- Coordinates: 39°14′55.94″N 140°07′13.44″E
- Operator: Yuri Kōgen Railway
- Line: ■ Yuri Kōgen Railway Chōkai Sanroku Line
- Distance: 20.1 km from Ugo-Honjō
- Platforms: 1 side platform

Other information
- Status: Unstaffed

History
- Opened: October 21, 1938
- Former names: Ugo-Kawabe (to 1985)

Passengers
- FY2018: 53
Location
- Location within Akita Prefecture Location within Japan

Kawabe Station (川辺駅, Kawabe-eki) is a railway station in the city of Yurihonjō, Akita Prefecture, Japan, operated by the third-sector railway operator Yuri Kōgen Railway.

== Lines ==
Kawabe Station is served by the Chōkai Sanroku Line, and is located 20.1 kilometers from the terminus of the line at Ugo-Honjō Station.

== Station layout ==
The station has one side platform, serving one bi-directional track. The station is unattended.

== Adjacent stations ==
«	Service	»
Yuri Kōgen Railway Chōkai Sanroku Line
Yoshizawa	Local	Yashima

== History ==
Kawabe Station opened on October 21, 1938 as Ugo-Kawabe Station (羽後川辺駅, Ugo-Kawabe eki) on the Japanese Government Railways (JGR) Yashima Line. The JGR became the Japan National Railway (JNR) after World War II. All freight operations were discontinued from June 10, 1981. The Yashima Line was privatized on 1 October 1985, becoming the Yuri Kōgen Railway Chōkai Sanroku Line, and the station was renamed to its present name at that time.

== Surrounding area ==
- National Route 108

== See also ==
- List of railway stations in Japan
