= Kubota Station =

Kubota Station (久保田駅) is the name of two train stations in Japan:

- Kubota Station (Akita)
- Kubota Station (Saga)
