= Yakushido Station =

Yakushido Station may refer to one of the following railway stations in Japan:

- Yakushidō Station (Akita) on the Yuri Kōgen Railway
- Yakushido Station (Miyagi) on the Sendai Subway Tozai Line
