= Kawabe Station =

Kawabe Station is the name of two train stations in Japan.

- Kawabe Station (Aomori) - (川部駅) in Minami Tsugaru District, Aomori Prefecture
- Kawabe Station (Akita) - (川辺駅) in Yurihonjō, Akita Prefecture
