= Yurihonjō =

Yurihonjō 由利本荘市
- City
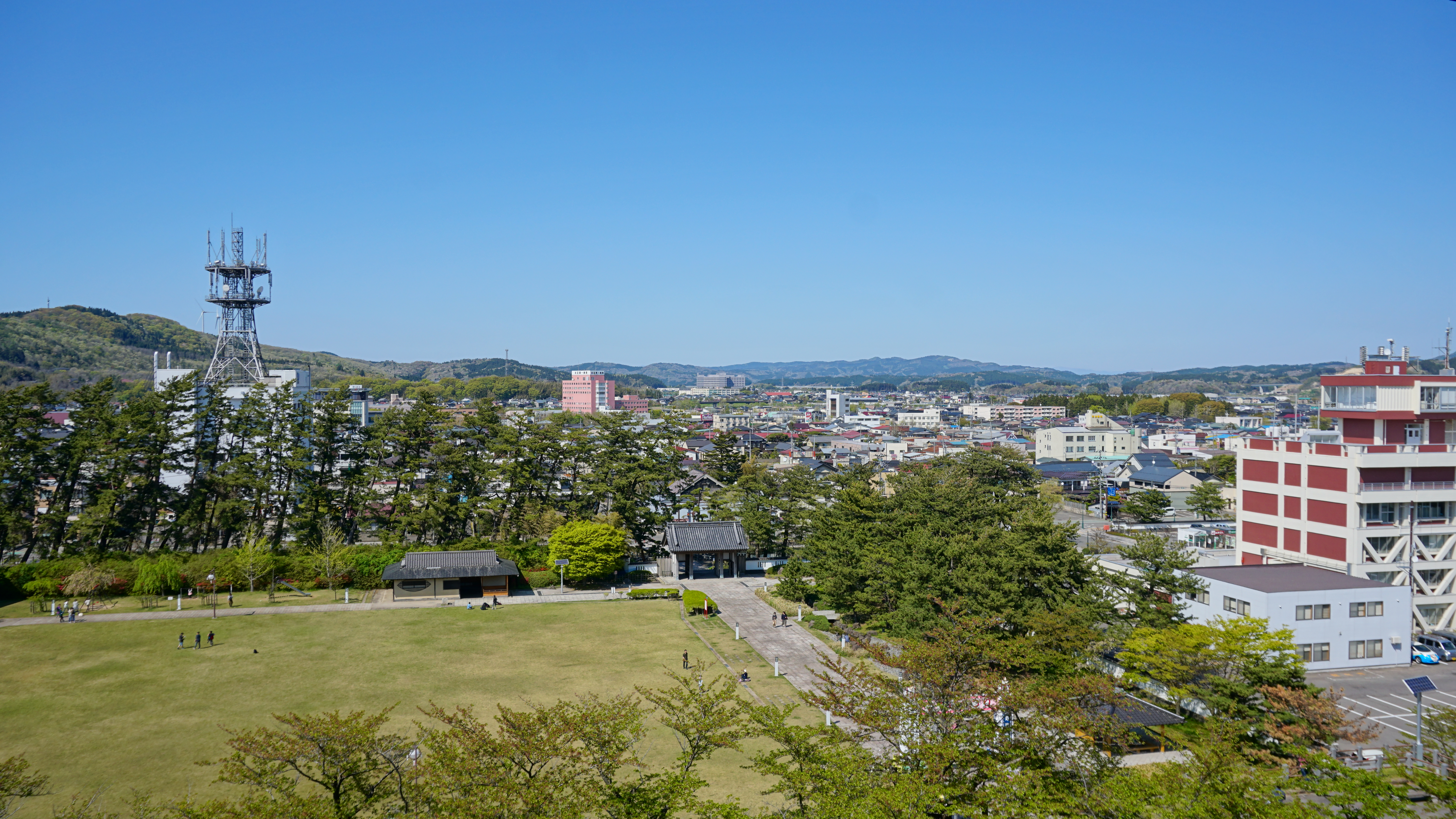
- View from Honjo Park

- Flag Seal
- Location of Yurihonjō in Akita Prefecture

- Coordinates: 39°23′9.1″N 140°2′55.8″E
- Country: Japan
- Region: Tōhoku
- Prefecture: Akita

Area
  - Total: 1,209.59 km^{2} (467.03 sq mi)

Population (February 28, 2023)
  - Total: 72,550
  - Density: 59.98/km^{2} (155.3/sq mi)
- Time zone: UTC+9 (Japan Standard Time)
- Phone number: 0184-24-3321
- Address: 17 Ozaki Yurihonjō-shi, Akita-ken 015-8501
- Climate: Cfa
- Website: Official website
- Symbols
- Flower: Sakura
- Tree: Zelkova serrata

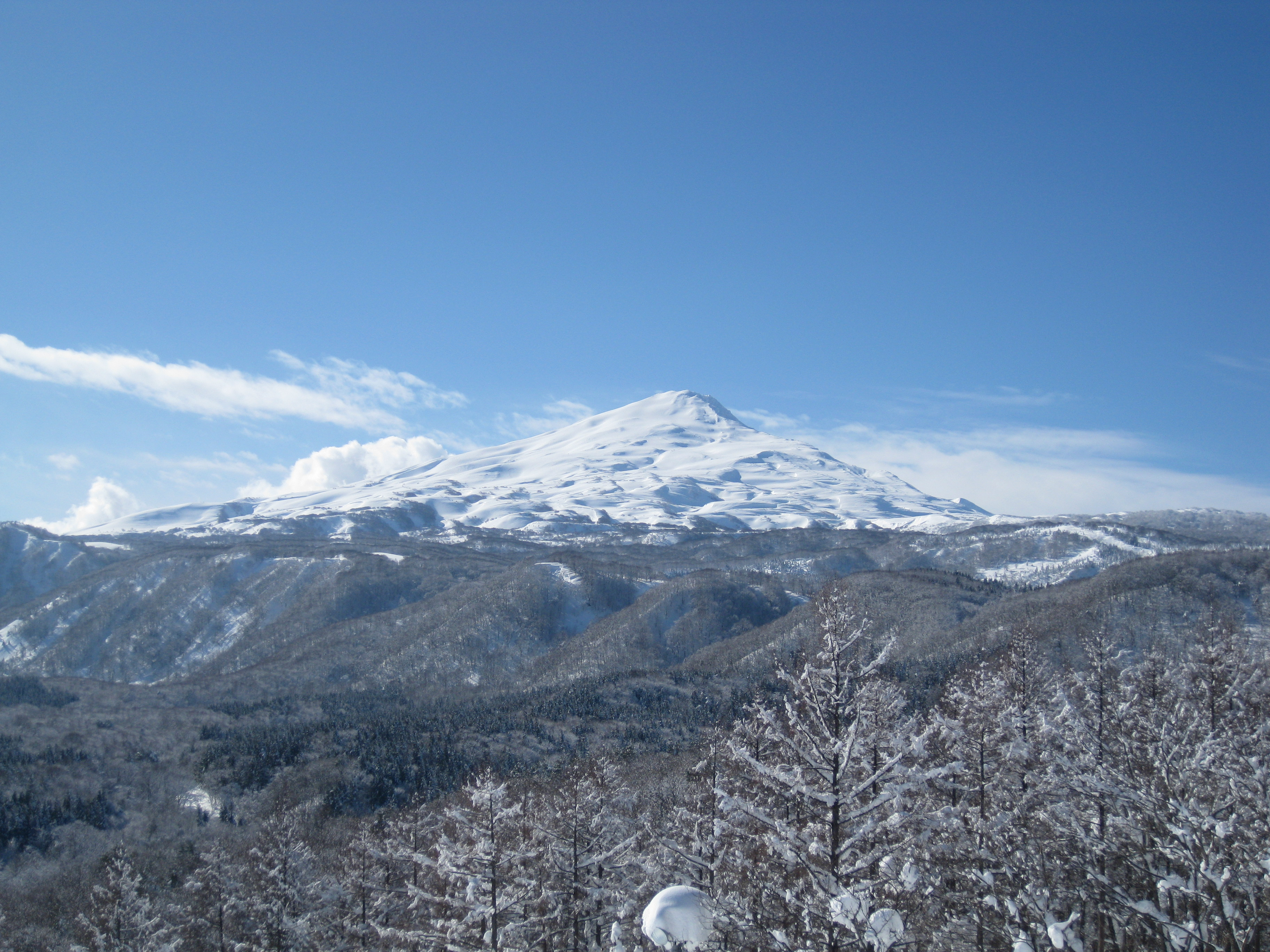
Mt. Chokai photographed from the top of Okojoland Ski Area.

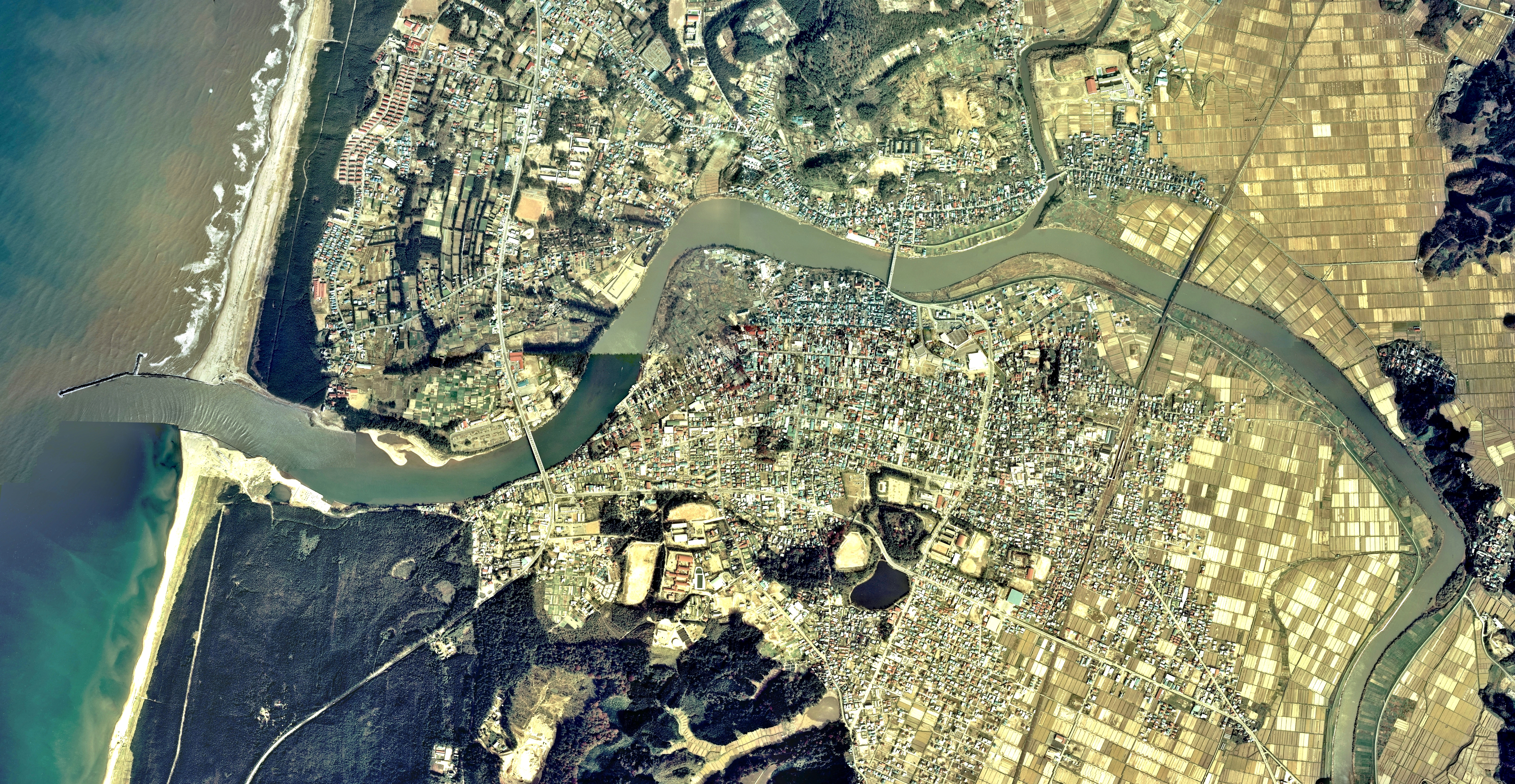
Aerial photo of Yurihonjō city center

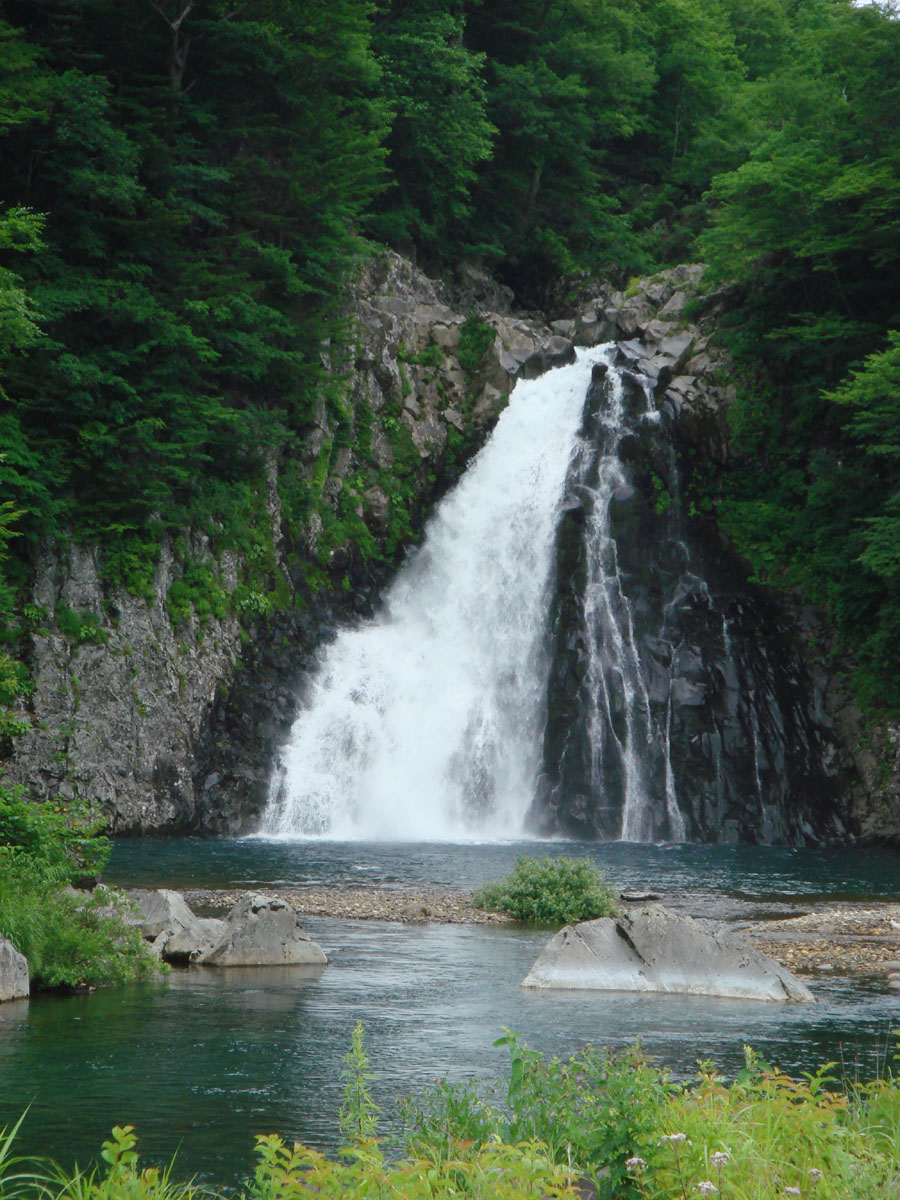
Hottai Falls

Yurihonjō (由利本荘市, Yurihonjō-shi) is a city located in Akita Prefecture, Japan. As of 28 February 2023, the city has an estimated population of 72,550 in 30,750 households, and a population density of 60 inhabitants per square kilometre (160/sq mi). The total area of the city is 1,209.59 square kilometres (467.03 sq mi).

== Geography ==
Yurihonjō is located in southwest corner of Akita Prefecture, bordered by the Sea of Japan to the west, and by Yamagata Prefecture to the south. The main urban center spreads around the south side of the Koyoshi River, about 3 kilometers upstream from the mouth . Yurihonjō is the largest municipality in Akita Prefecture in terms of area, covering approximately one-tenth the area of the prefecture, or about half the area of Kanagawa Prefecture. Part of the city is within the borders of the Chōkai Quasi-National Park.

=== Neighboring municipalities ===
Akita Prefecture

- Akita
- Daisen
- Nikaho
- Ugo
- Yokote
- Yuzawa

Yamagata Prefecture

- Mamurogawa
- Sakata
- Yuza

== Climate ==
Yurihonjō has a humid continental climate (Köppen climate classification Cfa) with large seasonal temperature differences, with warm to hot (and often humid) summers and cold (sometimes severely cold) winters. Precipitation is significant throughout the year, but is heaviest from August to October. The average annual temperature in Yurihonjō is 12.0 °C (53.6 °F). The average annual rainfall is 1,838.7 mm (72.39 in) with November as the wettest month. The temperatures are highest on average in August, at around 24.5 °C (76.1 °F), and lowest in January, at around 1.0 °C (33.8 °F).

Climate data for Honjō, Yurihonjō (elevation 11 m, 1991–2020 normals, extremes 1976–present)
Month	Jan	Feb	Mar	Apr	May	Jun	Jul	Aug	Sep	Oct	Nov	Dec	Year
Record high °C (°F)	14.0 (57.2)	20.6 (69.1)	23.2 (73.8)	29.4 (84.9)	31.5 (88.7)	32.9 (91.2)	36.7 (98.1)	37.8 (100.0)	35.6 (96.1)	31.8 (89.2)	26.0 (78.8)	18.6 (65.5)	37.8 (100.0)
Mean daily maximum °C (°F)	3.8 (38.8)	4.6 (40.3)	8.3 (46.9)	14.5 (58.1)	20.0 (68.0)	23.8 (74.8)	27.3 (81.1)	29.2 (84.6)	25.4 (77.7)	19.4 (66.9)	13.0 (55.4)	6.8 (44.2)	16.4 (61.5)
Daily mean °C (°F)	1.0 (33.8)	1.2 (34.2)	4.2 (39.6)	9.4 (48.9)	15.0 (59.0)	19.3 (66.7)	23.1 (73.6)	24.5 (76.1)	20.4 (68.7)	14.4 (57.9)	8.5 (47.3)	3.4 (38.1)	12.0 (53.6)
Mean daily minimum °C (°F)	−1.9 (28.6)	−2.1 (28.2)	0.1 (32.2)	4.2 (39.6)	10.3 (50.5)	15.3 (59.5)	19.6 (67.3)	20.6 (69.1)	16.2 (61.2)	9.8 (49.6)	4.3 (39.7)	0.3 (32.5)	8.1 (46.6)
Record low °C (°F)	−11.8 (10.8)	−14.9 (5.2)	−9.3 (15.3)	−5.4 (22.3)	0.3 (32.5)	6.1 (43.0)	11.4 (52.5)	11.1 (52.0)	6.1 (43.0)	0.8 (33.4)	−8.7 (16.3)	−9.9 (14.2)	−14.9 (5.2)
Average precipitation mm (inches)	153.7 (6.05)	106.5 (4.19)	105.0 (4.13)	101.6 (4.00)	112.6 (4.43)	119.7 (4.71)	190.2 (7.49)	202.4 (7.97)	180.4 (7.10)	189.9 (7.48)	217.0 (8.54)	190.1 (7.48)	1,838.7 (72.39)
Average snowfall cm (inches)	125 (49)	99 (39)	22 (8.7)	0 (0)	0 (0)	0 (0)	0 (0)	0 (0)	0 (0)	0 (0)	10 (3.9)	62 (24)	315 (124)
Average precipitation days (≥ 1.0 mm)	23.2	19.3	17.2	12.5	11.8	10.6	12.8	11.5	13.3	16.1	19.4	23.6	191.5
Mean monthly sunshine hours	29.2	53.4	118.4	178.6	196.5	179.4	154.7	200.0	161.8	138.5	82.2	40.0	1,532.8
Source: Japan Meteorological Agency (1991–2020 normals, extremes 1976–present)

Climate data for Yashima, Yurihonjō (elevation 46 m, 1991–2020 normals, extremes 1976–present)
Month	Jan	Feb	Mar	Apr	May	Jun	Jul	Aug	Sep	Oct	Nov	Dec	Year
Record high °C (°F)	14.1 (57.4)	18.5 (65.3)	22.8 (73.0)	30.0 (86.0)	32.5 (90.5)	34.1 (93.4)	37.7 (99.9)	37.4 (99.3)	34.6 (94.3)	31.5 (88.7)	25.4 (77.7)	19.9 (67.8)	37.7 (99.9)
Mean daily maximum °C (°F)	2.8 (37.0)	3.8 (38.8)	7.8 (46.0)	14.9 (58.8)	21.0 (69.8)	24.7 (76.5)	28.1 (82.6)	29.6 (85.3)	25.3 (77.5)	19.1 (66.4)	12.4 (54.3)	5.6 (42.1)	16.3 (61.3)
Daily mean °C (°F)	−0.2 (31.6)	0.1 (32.2)	3.0 (37.4)	8.9 (48.0)	15.0 (59.0)	19.3 (66.7)	23.1 (73.6)	24.2 (75.6)	19.9 (67.8)	13.5 (56.3)	7.4 (45.3)	2.1 (35.8)	11.4 (52.5)
Mean daily minimum °C (°F)	−3.2 (26.2)	−3.4 (25.9)	−1.2 (29.8)	3.1 (37.6)	9.3 (48.7)	14.5 (58.1)	19.0 (66.2)	19.8 (67.6)	15.4 (59.7)	8.7 (47.7)	3.1 (37.6)	−0.8 (30.6)	7.0 (44.6)
Record low °C (°F)	−13.1 (8.4)	−13.9 (7.0)	−12.6 (9.3)	−4.1 (24.6)	−0.5 (31.1)	5.0 (41.0)	10.4 (50.7)	11.1 (52.0)	4.9 (40.8)	−0.1 (31.8)	−7.2 (19.0)	−11.1 (12.0)	−13.9 (7.0)
Average precipitation mm (inches)	234.5 (9.23)	158.6 (6.24)	142.8 (5.62)	113.5 (4.47)	109.2 (4.30)	127.5 (5.02)	196.8 (7.75)	191.5 (7.54)	179.0 (7.05)	217.0 (8.54)	287.0 (11.30)	293.5 (11.56)	2,250.8 (88.61)
Average snowfall cm (inches)	225 (89)	166 (65)	87 (34)	4 (1.6)	0 (0)	0 (0)	0 (0)	0 (0)	0 (0)	0 (0)	15 (5.9)	135 (53)	625 (246)
Average precipitation days (≥ 1.0 mm)	25.5	21.2	19.1	13.4	11.6	10.6	13.4	12.6	13.8	16.0	20.5	25.3	202.9
Mean monthly sunshine hours	27.7	51.0	104.1	172.5	203.3	181.8	154.0	188.8	147.0	127.8	82.5	36.9	1,470.3
Source: Japan Meteorological Agency (1991–2020 normals, extremes 1976–present)

Climate data for Higashiyuri, Yurihonjō (elevation 117 m, 1991–2020 normals, extremes 1976–present)
Month	Jan	Feb	Mar	Apr	May	Jun	Jul	Aug	Sep	Oct	Nov	Dec	Year
Record high °C (°F)	12.5 (54.5)	18.8 (65.8)	21.1 (70.0)	30.9 (87.6)	32.8 (91.0)	33.9 (93.0)	38.0 (100.4)	37.1 (98.8)	35.5 (95.9)	30.1 (86.2)	25.5 (77.9)	17.4 (63.3)	38.0 (100.4)
Mean daily maximum °C (°F)	2.1 (35.8)	3.2 (37.8)	7.1 (44.8)	14.7 (58.5)	21.0 (69.8)	24.8 (76.6)	28.0 (82.4)	29.7 (85.5)	25.5 (77.9)	19.0 (66.2)	12.0 (53.6)	4.9 (40.8)	16.0 (60.8)
Daily mean °C (°F)	−1.1 (30.0)	−0.8 (30.6)	2.0 (35.6)	8.1 (46.6)	14.5 (58.1)	19.0 (66.2)	22.9 (73.2)	24.0 (75.2)	19.5 (67.1)	12.8 (55.0)	6.6 (43.9)	1.2 (34.2)	10.7 (51.3)
Mean daily minimum °C (°F)	−4.7 (23.5)	−5.0 (23.0)	−2.7 (27.1)	2.0 (35.6)	8.5 (47.3)	14.1 (57.4)	18.7 (65.7)	19.5 (67.1)	14.7 (58.5)	7.6 (45.7)	1.9 (35.4)	−2.0 (28.4)	6.1 (43.0)
Record low °C (°F)	−17.7 (0.1)	−19.6 (−3.3)	−17.8 (0.0)	−10.8 (12.6)	−2.1 (28.2)	4.4 (39.9)	8.9 (48.0)	9.0 (48.2)	2.9 (37.2)	−1.7 (28.9)	−9.9 (14.2)	−14.4 (6.1)	−19.6 (−3.3)
Average precipitation mm (inches)	255.7 (10.07)	167.7 (6.60)	131.5 (5.18)	106.5 (4.19)	113.7 (4.48)	127.6 (5.02)	196.5 (7.74)	193.7 (7.63)	167.1 (6.58)	192.4 (7.57)	242.2 (9.54)	268.3 (10.56)	2,162.9 (85.15)
Average precipitation days (≥ 1.0 mm)	25.9	21.9	19.1	13.5	12.3	11.0	13.8	12.3	13.4	16.2	20.1	25.0	204.4
Mean monthly sunshine hours	28.6	45.7	101.9	167.1	194.1	178.1	150.7	187.3	149.9	133.6	84.0	40.0	1,461.1
Source: Japan Meteorological Agency (1991–2020 normals, extremes 1976–present)

== Demographics ==
Per Japanese census data, the population of Yurihonjō peaked in the 1950s and has been in decline since then.

Historical population
Year	Pop.	±%
1920	76,001	—
1930	84,681	+11.4%
1940	89,937	+6.2%
1950	109,672	+21.9%
1960	109,032	−0.6%
1970	95,428	−12.5%
1980	95,748	+0.3%
1990	95,489	−0.3%
2000	92,843	−2.8%
2010	85,230	−8.2%
2020	74,707	−12.3%

== History ==
The area of present-day Yurihonjō was part of ancient Dewa Province, dominated by the Mogami clan during the Sengoku period. Honjō Castle was completed here in 1613 by a retainer of the Mogami clan named Tateoka Mitsushige. Under the Tokugawa shogunate, part of the area came under the control of Honjō Domain, Kameda Domain and Yashima Domain, with a very small portion under direct rule by the shogunate (tenryō). After the start of the Meiji period, the area became part of Yuri District, Akita Prefecture in 1878, and the town of Honjō was formed with the establishment of the modern municipalities system. Honjō was raised to city status on March 31, 1954.

The city of Yurihonjō was established on March 22, 2005, from the merger of the city of Honjō, and the towns of Chōkai, Higashiyuri, Iwaki, Nishime, Ōuchi, Yashima and Yuri (all from Yuri District). Just after the merger, the new city of Yurihonjō had 126 representatives in its new city assembly, more than the whole of Tokyo.

== Government ==
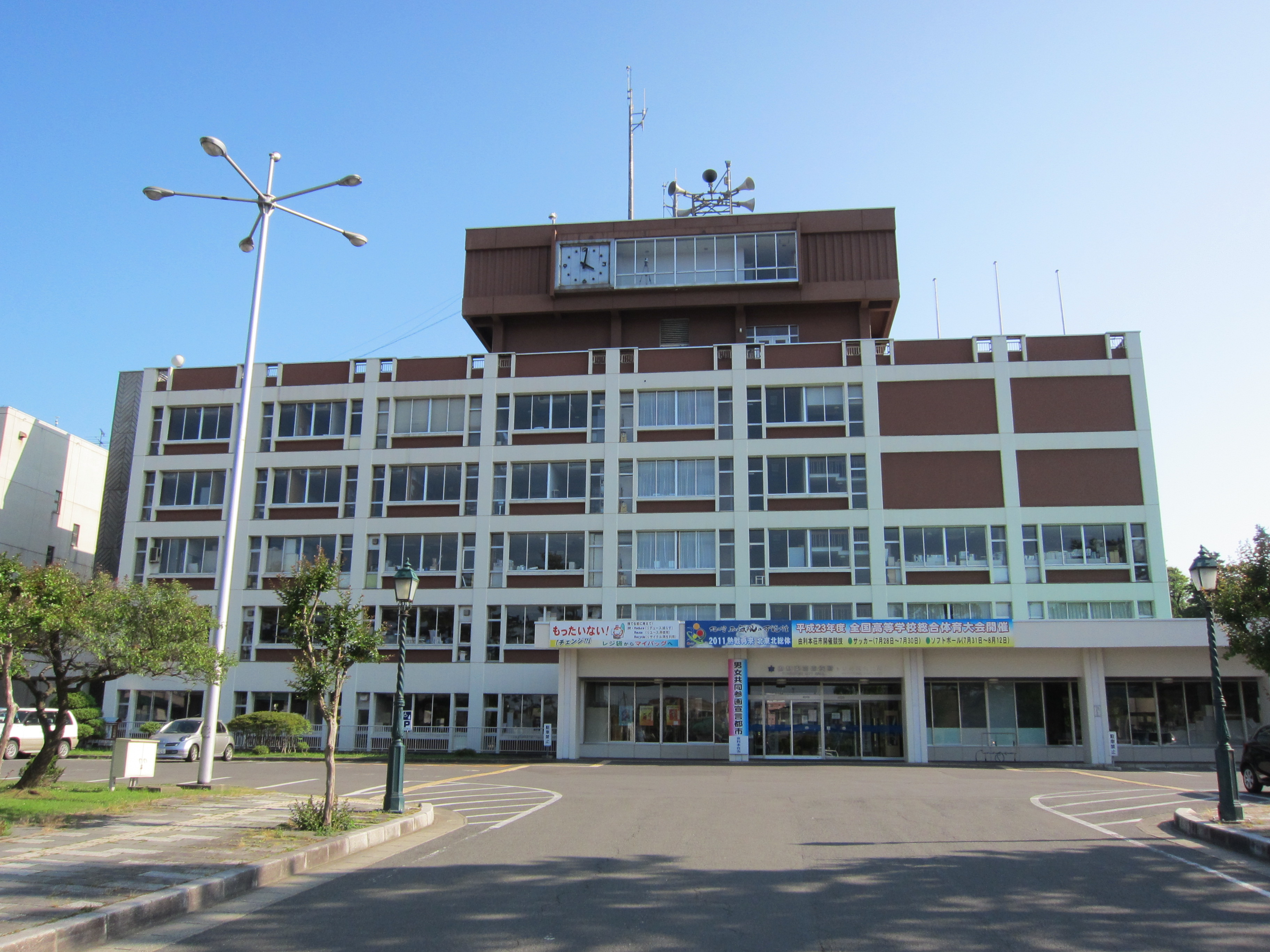
Yurihonjo City Hall

After the merger, Yurihonjō had a directly elected mayor and a unicameral city assembly with 126 members (more than Tokyo Metropolis). The city legislature currently has 26 members. The city contributes three members to the Akita Prefectural Assembly. In terms of national politics, the city is part of Akita District 3 of the lower house of the Diet of Japan.

== Economy ==
The economy of Yurihonjō is based on agriculture and commercial fishing.

=== Companies headquartered in Yurihonjo ===
- TDK Yurihonjo

== Education ==
Yurihonjō has 14 public elementary schools and 10 public middle schools operated by the city government and five public high schools operated by the Akita Prefectural Board of Education. The prefecture also operates a special education school for disabled children. Akita Prefectural University also has a campus in the city.

== Transportation ==
=== Railway ===
East Japan Railway Company – Uetsu Main Line

- Nishime – Ugo-Honjō – Ugo-Iwaya – Oriwatari – Ugo-Kameda – Iwaki-Minato – Michikawa

Yuri Kōgen Railway – Chōkai Sanroku Line

- Ugo-Honjō – Yakushidō – Koyoshi – Ayukawa – Kurosawa – Magarisawa – Maegō – Kubota – Nishitakisawa – Yoshizawa – Kawabe – Yashima

=== Highway ===
- Nihonkai-Tōhoku Expressway
- National Route 7
- National Route 105
- National Route 107
- National Route 108
- National Route 341
- National Route 398

=== Seaports ===
- Port of Honjō

== Local attractions ==
- Amasagi Village (天鷺村, Amasagi-mura)

Amasagi Village is a complete tourist center in the town of Iwaki, northern Yurihonjō. It is centered on an historical facility, and it contains the samurai residence of the Unuma family (transferred from its original site), and a museum with collections of furniture and samurai armor.

- Akata Giant Buddha Statue (赤田大仏, Akata Daibutsu)

A large standing Buddha statue.

- Honjō Park (本荘公園, Honjō Kōen)

Each year a large cherry blossom festival (April) and Azalea festival (May) take place here.

- Yashio Park (八塩いこいの森, Yashio Ikoi no Mori)

This park is famous for its yellow cherry blossom trees and it holds a firework display in May during full bloom.

- Hottai Falls (法体の滝, Hottai no Taki)

One of Japan's Top 100 Waterfalls, grassy park, and hiking trails in the mountains near Mt. Chōkai.

- One Thousand Jizō (千体地蔵, Sentai Jizō)

One thousand stone statues of Jizō line the side of a hill in Oriwatari, Ōuchi.

- Yashima Ski Area (矢島スキー場, Yashima Sukī-jō)

A small but popular ski area on the lower slopes of the Mount Chōkai. It is especially popular with snowboarders.

- Minami Yurihara Highland (南由利原高原, Minami Yurihara Kōgen)

A large plateau of outstanding natural beauty on the Akita side of Mount Chōkai. It includes numerous rental cottages and an amusement area.

- Taki Hot Spring (滝温泉, Taki Onsen) in the Ōuchi area is reputed to cure minor pains and many patients stay there long-term.
- Yurihonjo Arena
- Mizubayashi Athletic Field

== Honjō Marina & Koyoshi River ==
- Rowing

There are 500 metre & 1000 metre rowing courses at the mouth of the Koyoshi River. A major public regatta takes place here each year in September. Three high schools in Yurihonjō have their own rowing clubs with a history of success in national rowing championships.

- Marina, Sailing

Honjō has a wide beach with an adjacent yachting harbour.

== Local events ==
- Fireworks

A fireworks festival is held every summer near the mouth of the Koyoshi River.

- Naked Festival (裸参り, Hadaka Matsuri)

This religious event takes place in January in which a group of men and boys walk up the Shinzan mountain through the snow to Shinzan Shrine. They wear only loincloths and thin shoes.

- Yurihonjō Hinakaidō (由利本荘ひな街道)

In March each year visitors can follow a map of public displays of the traditional Hina dolls at over 50 different locations around the city.

== Mount Chōkai ==
Mount Chōkai (鳥海山, Chōkai-san) is an inactive volcano that stands alone on the border between Akita Prefecture and Yamagata Prefecture. It is 2,236m high and is the second highest mountain in the Tōhoku area. It is popular with skiers, hikers and climbers.

There are two main trails for climbing Mount Chōkai from the Akita side. One trailhead is in Nikaho, south of Yurihonjō. The other, in Yurihonjō, starts at the Haraikawa (秡川) Parking Area. A one-way hike from the Haraikawa commonly takes 3 hours and there are bungalows and camping sites on the lower slopes of this trail.

The mountain has its own unique Alpine plants and vegetation such as Chōkai Thistle (チョウカイアザミ) and Chōkai Fusuma (チョウカイフスマ).

=== Local crafts, arts, and food ===
- Sake (Rice wine)

There are four independent sake breweries in Yurihonjō: Akita Homare, Yuri Masamune, Tenju, and Dewanofuji.

- Honjō Udon (本荘うどん)

Dried noodles which are eaten hot or cold. The texture of Honjō Udon is tough.

- Gotenmari ball (ごてんまり, Gotenmari)

These elaborate decorative balls are made from silk thread and are a popular souvenir of Yurihonjō.

- Honjō Lacquer (本荘塗り, Honjō-nuri)

A number of craftsmen in Yurihonjō produce traditional lacquerware.

- Honjō Oiwake (本荘追分)

This is a traditional folk song, known as min'yō, which is reputed to be one of the most difficult for singers to master. A national Honjō Oiwake competition is held in Yurihonjō every year over 2 days in September.

- Mountain vegetables (山菜, sansai)

The foothills of Mount Chōkai produce many varieties of wild mountain vegetables and in spring and autumn it is common to see cars parked on the side of the road as people stop to pick them. Popular mountain vegetables are yamaudo (山ウド), bamboo shoots (笹タケノコ, sasa takenoko) and warabi (ワラビ).

== Sister cities ==
- Vác, Hungary, since September 25, 1996
- Yangsan, South Korea, since October 10, 1998
- Wuxi, China, since July 6, 2001

== Notable people from Yurihonjō ==
- Akira Endo, biochemist
- Toshiyuki Igarashi, professional wrestler
- Rina Ikoma, actress, a former member of the idol group Nogizaka46
- Natsuki Katō, model, actress and TV celebrity.
- Akira Komatsu, footballer
- Mikio Kudō, baseball player
- Shu Watanabe (actor), actor
- Mika Yamauchi, Olympic volleyball player
