= Hottai Falls =

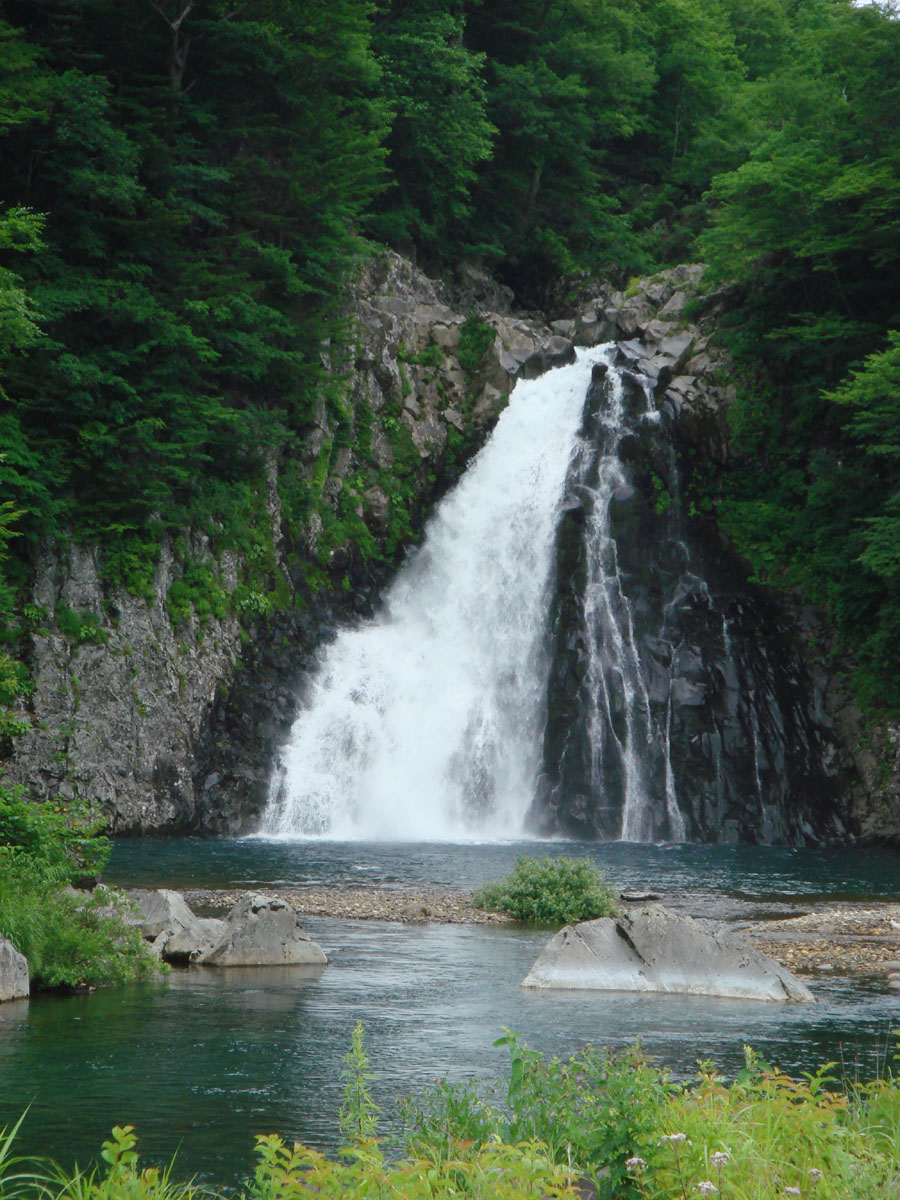

- Location within Japan
- Location: Yurihonjō, Akita Prefecture, Japan
- Coordinates: 39°06′18.3″N 140°09′45.7″E
- Type: horsetail
- Total height: 57.4 m (188 ft)
- Average width: 3–30 m (9.8–98.4 ft)
- Watercourse: Akasawa River

Hottai Falls (法体の滝, Hottai-no-taki) is a waterfall in the city of Yurihonjō, Akita Prefecture, Japan, on the Akasawa River, a tributary of the Koyoshi River system in the foothills of Mount Chōkai. It is one of "Japan’s Top 100 Waterfalls", in a listing published by the Japanese Ministry of the Environment in 1990.

Since December 17, 1960, the waterfall and its associated plunge pool have been protected as an Akita Prefectural Place of Scenic Beauty and a Prefectural Natural Monument
