= Yakushidō Station (Akita) =

Railway station in Yurihonjō, Akita Prefecture, Japan

Yakushidō Station 薬師堂駅
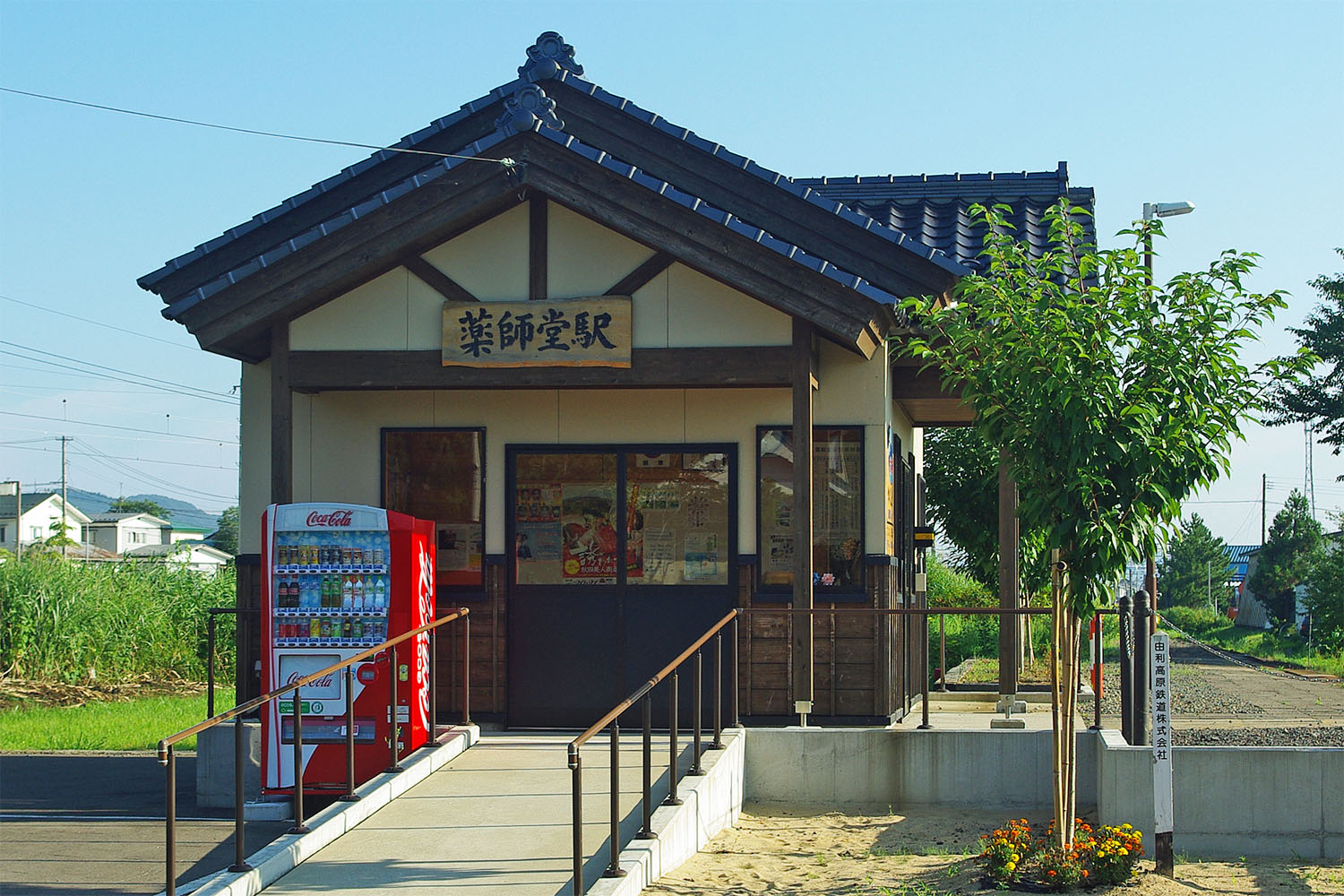
- Yakushidō Station in 2012

General information
- Location: Yakushidō, Yurihonjō-shi, Akita-ken 015-0041; Japan
- Coordinates: 39°22′4.78″N 140°02′55.18″E
- Operator: Yuri Kōgen Railway
- Line: ■ Yuri Kōgen Railway Chōkai Sanroku Line
- Distance: 2.2 km from Ugo-Honjō
- Platforms: 1 side platform

Other information
- Status: Unstaffed

History
- Opened: September 1, 1937

Passengers
- FY2018: 88
Location
- Location within Akita Prefecture Location within Japan

Yakushidō Station (薬師堂駅, Yakushidō-eki) is a railway station in the city of Yurihonjō, Akita Prefecture, Japan, operated by the third-sector railway operator Yuri Kōgen Railway.

== Lines ==
Yakushidō Station is served by the Chōkai Sanroku Line, and is located 2.2 kilometers from the terminus of the line at Ugo-Honjō Station.

== Station layout ==
Yakushidō Station has one side platform, serving one bi-directional track. The station is unattended.

== Adjacent stations ==
| « | Service | » |
Yuri Kōgen Railway Chōkai Sanroku Line
| Ugo-Honjō | Local | Koyoshi |

== History ==
The station opened on August 1, 1922, as the Yakushidō Signal Stop (薬師堂停留場) on the Yokojō Railway. The Yokojō Railway became the Japanese Government Railways (JGR) Yashima Line on September 1, 1937, at which time the signal stop was elevated to a full station. The JGR became the Japanese National Railways (JNR) after World War II. The Yashima Line was privatized on 1 October 1985, becoming the Yuri Kōgen Railway Chōkai Sanroku Line, at which time the station regained its original name. A new station building was completed in October 2009.

== Surrounding area ==
- National Route 108

== See also ==
- List of railway stations in Japan
