= Chōkai Sanroku Line =

Railway line in Akita Prefecture, Japan

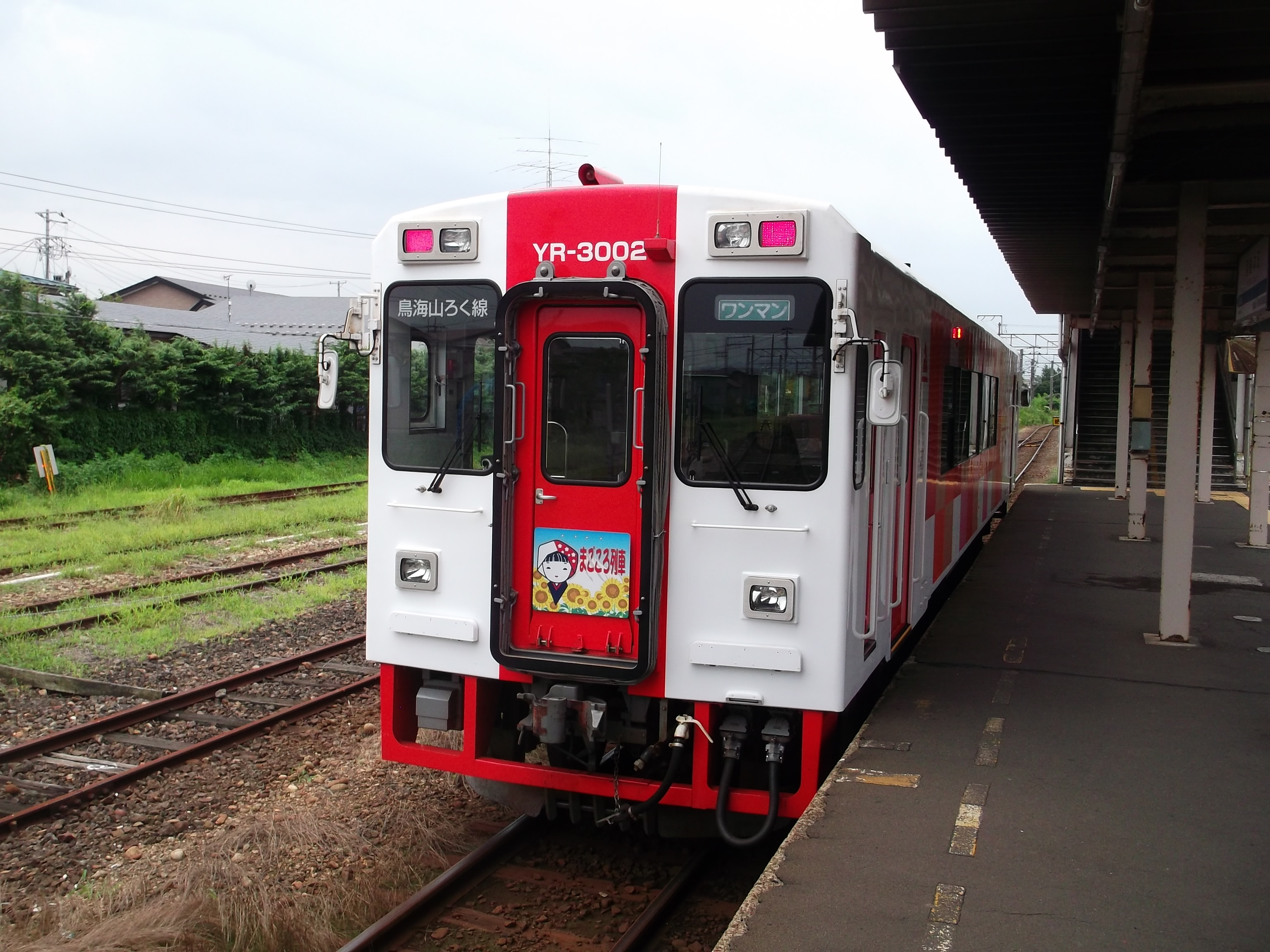
- A YR-3000 railcar at Yajima Station

Overview
- Status: In operation
- Owner: Yuri Kōgen Tetsudō
- Locale: Akita Prefecture
- Termini: Ugo-Honjō; Yashima
- Stations: 12

Service
- Type: Heavy rail
- Operator: Yuri Kōgen Tetsudō
- Rolling stock: YR-2000 DMU, YR-3000 DMU

History
- Opened: August 1, 1922; 104 years ago

Technical
- Line length: 23.0 km (14.3 mi)
- Num of tracks: Entire line single tracked
- Character: Rural
- Track gauge: 1,067 mm (3 ft 6 in)
- Electrification: None
- Operating speed: 65 km/h (40 mph)

The Chōkai Sanroku Line (鳥海山ろく線, Chōkai Sanroku-sen; "Chōkai Submontane Line") is a Japanese railway line in Akita Prefecture in northern Japan, with all station located within the city of Yurihonjō. This is the only railway line operated by the third-sector company Yuri Kogen Railway (由利高原鉄道, Yuri Kōgen Tetsudō; lit. 'Yuri Plateau Railway').

== History ==
On August 1, 1922, the privately owned Yokote Railway Company (横手鉄道, Yokote Tetsudō) completed its West Line, connecting Ugo-Honjō with Maegō over 11.6 rail kilometers, and renamed itself the Yokojō Railway Company (横荘鉄道, Yokojō Tetsudō). The line was nationalized on September 1, 1937 becoming the Japanese Government Railway (JGR) Yashima Line (矢島, Yashima sen) and the line was extended by an additional 4.1 kilometers to Nishitakisawa by December 15 of the same year. The line was further extended an additional 7.3 kilometers to its present terminus at Yashima by October 21, 1938.

The JGR became the Japanese National Railways (JNR) after World War II. All scheduled freight services were discontinued from March 10, 1981. In 1985, the operations of the former Yashima Line were taken over by the third sector company Yuri Kōgen Railway.

=== Proposed connecting line ===
- Maego Station - The Yokote Railway Co. opened a 38 km line from Yokote on the Ou Main Line to Oikata between 1918 and 1930. Construction commenced on an extension to this station but it was not completed. The 12 km section from Oikata - Niiyama was closed following typhoon damage in 1947, the 7 km section from Niiyama - Tateai closed in 1965 when a bridge was destroyed by floodwaters, and the balance of the line closed in 1971.

== Basic data ==
- Distance: 23.0 km (14.3 mi)
- Gauge: 1,067 mm (3 ft 6 in)
- Stations: 12
- Track: Entire line single tracked
- Power: Internal combustion (Diesel)
- Railway signalling
  - Ugo-Honjō — Maegō: Staff token
  - Maegō — Yashima: Tablet token

== Stations ==
All stations are located in Yurihonjō, Akita Prefecture.

Station	Japanese	Distance between stations (km)	Distance (km)	Transfers
Ugo-Honjō	羽後本荘	-	0.0	■ Uetsu Main Line
Yakushidō	薬師堂	2.2	2.2	
Koyoshi	子吉	2.3	4.5	
Ayukawa	鮎川	2.9	7.4	
Kurosawa	黒沢	2.1	9.5	
Magarisawa	曲沢	0.8	10.3	
Maegō	前郷	1.4	11.7	
Kubota	久保田	1.9	13.6	
Nishitakisawa	西滝沢	2.1	15.7	
Yoshizawa	吉沢	1.4	17.1	
Kawabe	川辺	3.0	20.1	
Yashima	矢島	2.9	23.0	

== Rolling stock ==
As of August 2020, the line operates the following diesel multiple units (DMUs):

- YR-2000 (total 2 cars)
- YR-3000 (total 3 cars)
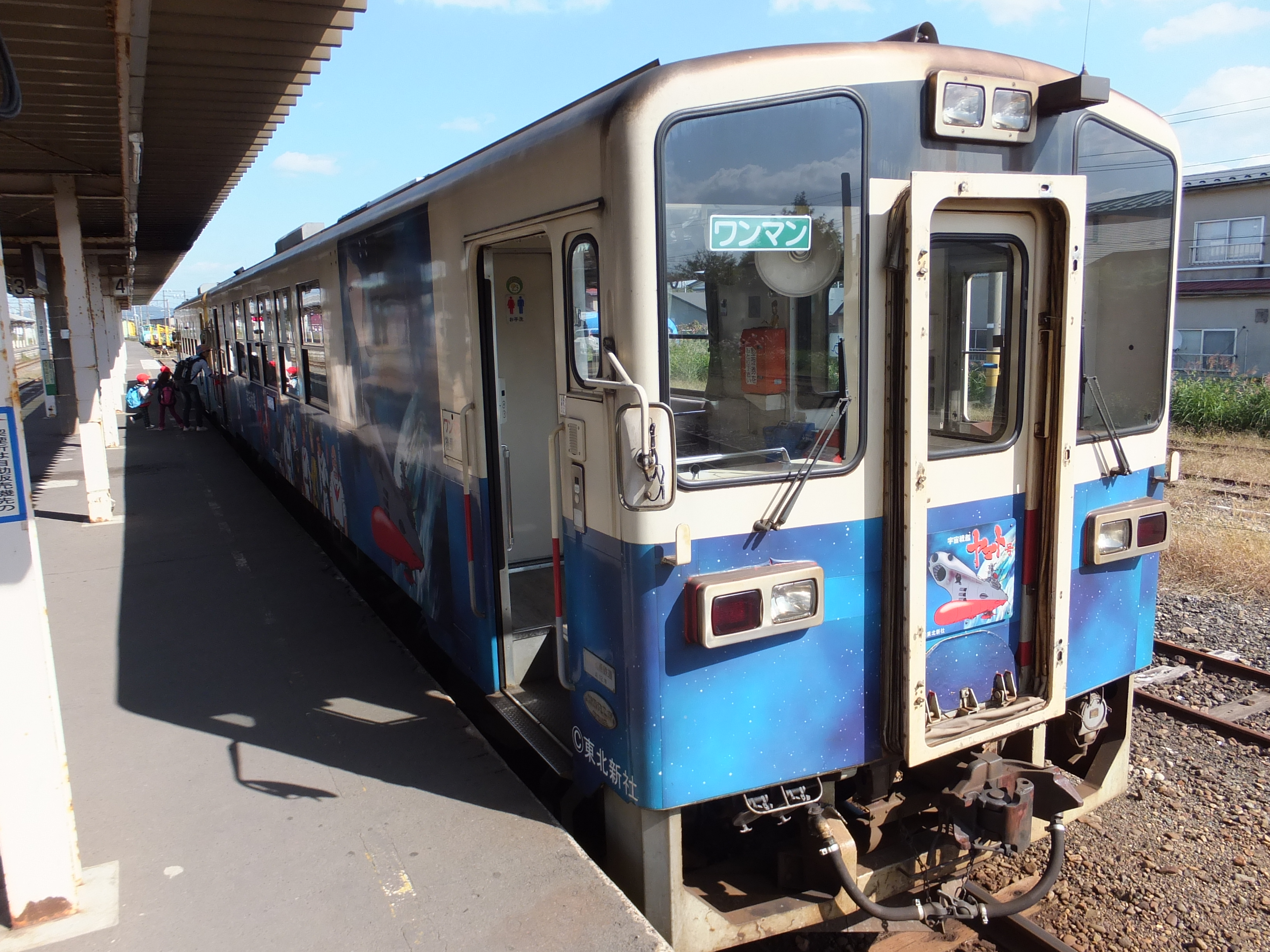
YR-2001

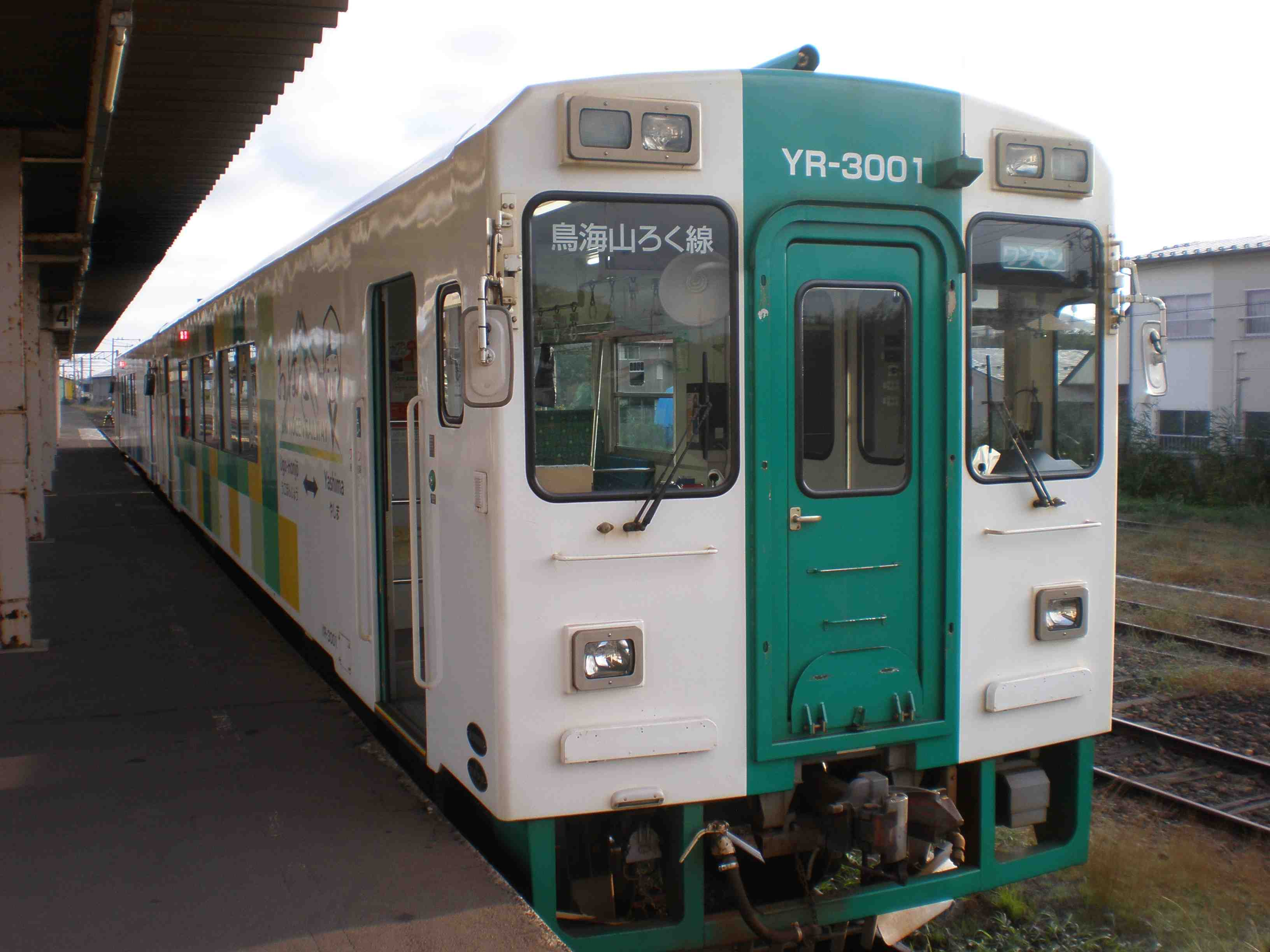
YR-3001

=== Former rolling stock ===
- YR-1000/YR-1500 (total 5 cars)
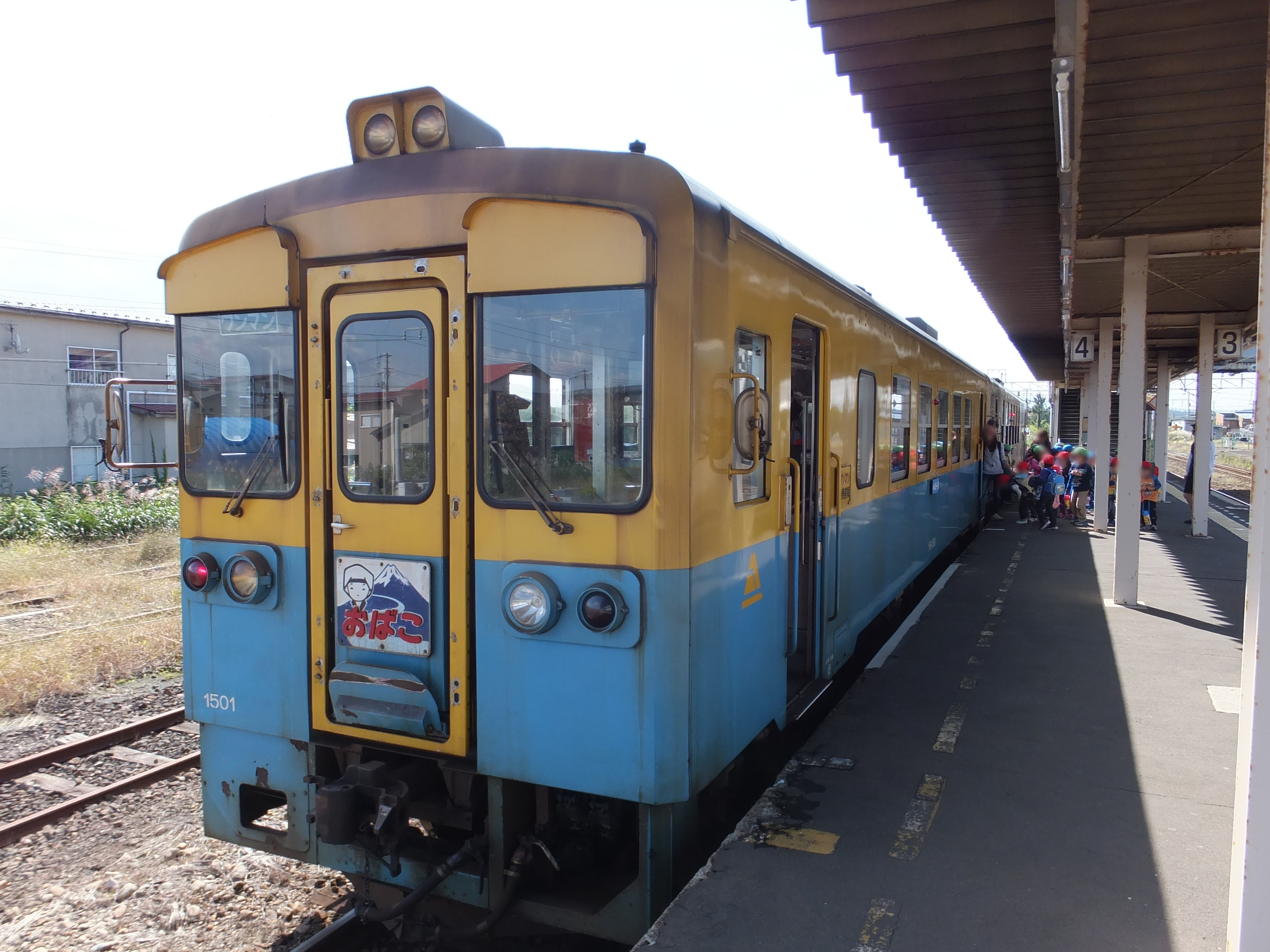
YR-1501

== See also ==
- List of railway companies in Japan
- List of railway lines in Japan
