= Ugo-Iwaya Station =

Railway station in Yurihonjō, Akita Prefecture, Japan

Ugo-Iwaya Station 羽後岩谷駅
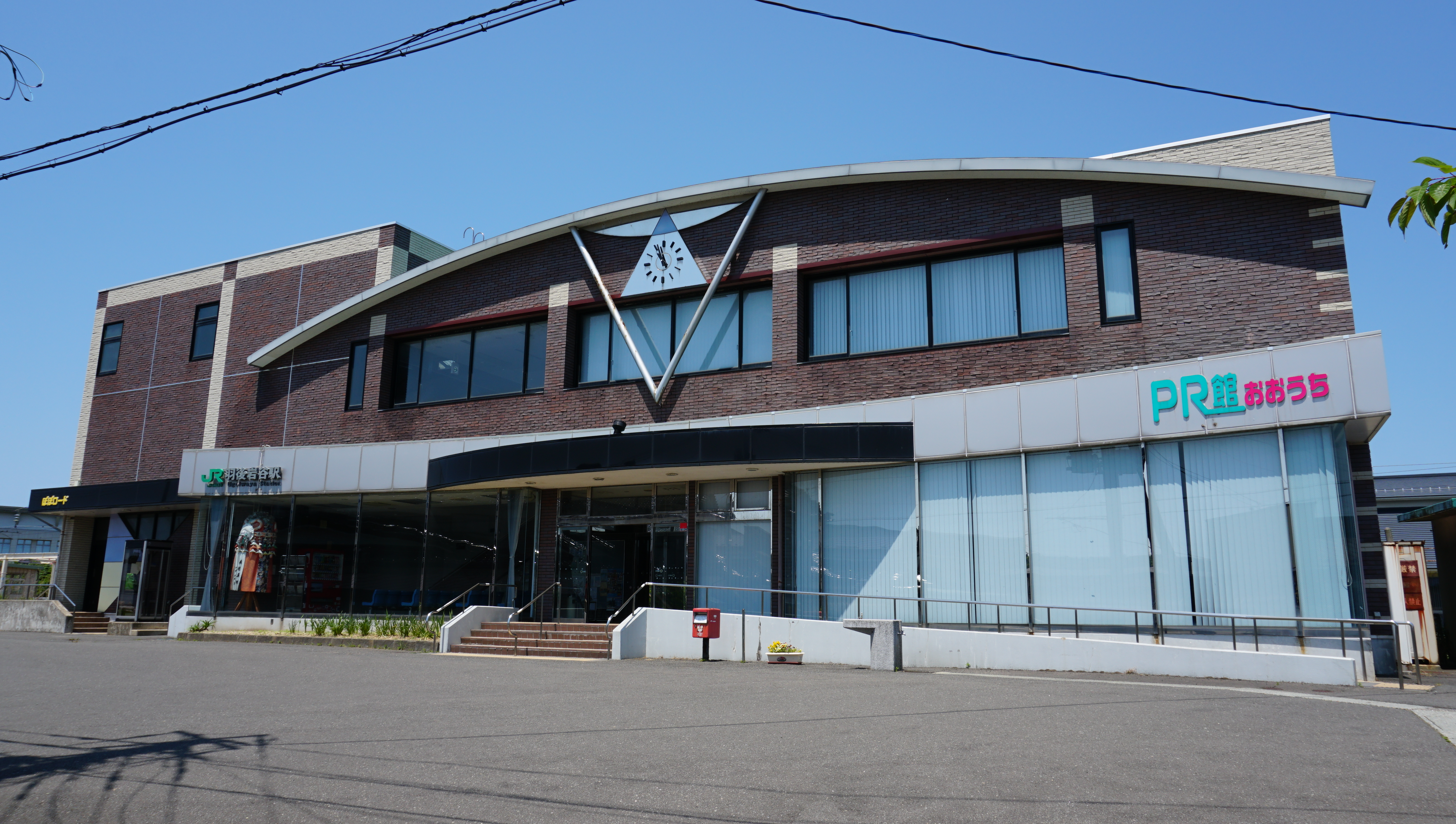
- Ugo-Iwaya Station in June 2018

General information
- Location: 110-2 Kawabata, Iwayamachi, Yurihonjō-shi, Akita-ken 018-0711; Japan
- Coordinates: 39°26′31.44″N 140°5′26.17″E
- Operator: JR East
- Line: ■ Uetsu Main Line
- Distance: 236.0 kilometers from Niitsu
- Platforms: 2 side platforms

Other information
- Status: Unstaffed station
- Website: Official website

History
- Opened: October 16, 1922

Passengers
- FY2018: 142

Services
Preceding station	JR East	Following station
Ugo-Honjō towards Niitsu	Uetsu Main Line	Oriwatari towards Akita
Location
- Location within Akita Prefecture Location within Japan

Ugo-Iwaya Station (羽後岩谷駅, Ugo-Iwaya eki) is a railway station in the city of Yurihonjō, Akita Prefecture, Japan, operated by JR East.

== Lines ==
Ugo-Iwaya Station is served by the Uetsu Main Line, and is located 236.0 kilometres (146.6 mi) from the terminus of the line at Niitsu Station.

== Station layout ==
The station has two opposed side platforms connected by a footbridge. One of side platforms was originally an island platform, but one side is no longer in use. The station is unstaffed.

=== Platforms ===
1	■ Uetsu Main Line	for Akita
3	■ Uetsu Main Line	for Ugo-Honjō and Sakata

== History ==
Ugo-Iwaya Station opened on October 16, 1922 as a station on the Japanese Government Railways (JGR) Rikuusai Line. It was switched to the control of the JGR Uetsu Main Line on April 20, 1924. The JGR became the JNR (Japan National Railway) after World War II. With the privatization of the JNR on April 1, 1987, the station came under the control of the East Japan Railway Company. A new station building was completed on March 8, 2000. The building also includes offices for the Chamber of Commerce of the former town of Ōuchi, Akita.

== Passenger statistics ==
In fiscal 2018, the station was used by an average of 142 passengers daily (boarding passengers only).

== Surrounding area ==
- National Route 105

== See also ==
- List of railway stations in Japan
