= Kubota Station (Akita) =

Railway station in Yurihonjō, Akita Prefecture, Japan

Kubota Station 久保田駅
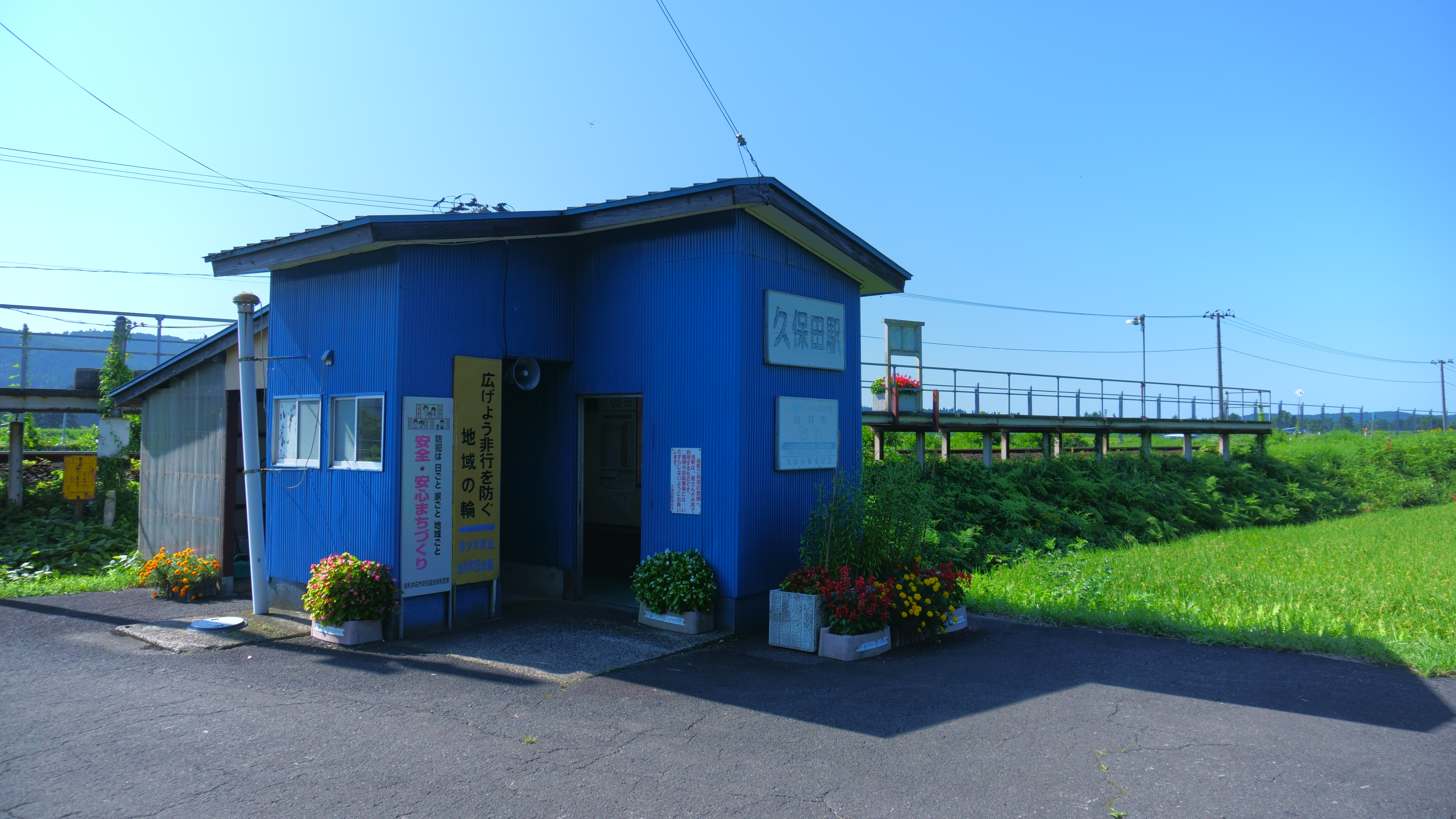
- Kubota Station, August 2020

General information
- Location: Kubota, Yurihonjō-shi, Akita-ken 015-0302; Japan
- Coordinates: 39°17′45.52″N 140°06′39.83″E
- Operator: Yuri Kōgen Railway
- Line: ■ Yuri Kōgen Railway Chōkai Sanroku Line
- Distance: 13.6 km from Ugo-Honjō
- Platforms: 1 side platform

Other information
- Status: Unstaffed

History
- Opened: October 1, 1985

Passengers
- FY2018: 13
Location
- Location within Akita Prefecture Location within Japan

Kubota Station (久保田駅, Kubota-eki) is a railway station in the city of Yurihonjō, Akita Prefecture, Japan, operated by the third-sector railway operator Yuri Kōgen Railway.

== Lines ==
Kubota Station is served by the Chōkai Sanroku Line, and is located 13.6 kilometers from the terminus of the line at Ugo-Honjō Station.

== Station layout ==
The station has one side platform, serving one bi-directional track. The station is unattended.

== Adjacent stations ==
«	Service	»
Yuri Kōgen Railway Chōkai Sanroku Line
Maegō	Local	Nishitakisawa

== History ==
Kubota Station opened on October 1, 1985.

== Surrounding area ==
- Koyoshi River

== See also ==
- List of railway stations in Japan
