= Yurihonjō Hinakaidō =

Yurihonjō Hinakaidō (由利本荘ひな街道), meaning "Yurihonjō city hina doll route", is an event held in March in Yurihonjō City, Akita Prefecture, Japan. Visitors can follow a map which takes them on a tour of various public displays of traditional Hina dolls at over 50 different locations around the city. The 2024 event ran from February 10 to April 3.

== Background ==
Hinamatsuri, known as the Japanese Doll Festival and celebrated on Girls' Day, is a traditional cultural observance in Japan. It is held on March 3, the third day of the third month. In 2005, the new city of Yurihonjō was created as a result of a merger of seven towns and one city. Many households had fine Hinamatsuri doll sets, and so in 2008 the new city organized this Yurihonjō Hinakaidō event.

The Shōnai area across the border from Yurihonjō in Yamagata Prefecture used to be an important port of call and trading centre for the Kitamae trading ships (Kitamaebune (北前船)). These ships often brought the latest trends and crafts from the imperial capital in Kyoto, among them the traditional Hina dolls. Three small local domains Honjo, Kameda and Yajima domains, developed castle towns building a wealth base where local merchant and samurai families could afford to import the dolls, which were then handed down. For over 100 years Shōnai had organised tours with information and maps to enable people to see the beautiful craftwork of the Hina dolls at various places around Sakata, Tsuruoka and the other towns which make up the Shōnai area.

The first Yurihonjō Hinakaidō event, in 2008, was largely based around the Yashima area, which already had its own small-scale Hina doll display custom. In 2009, the Hina Doll tour of Yurihonjō tried to encompass the different areas of the newly merged city with over 50 different locations divided into four main areas: Iwaki in the north; Ouchi and Honjō in the centre; and Yashima in the south. There were also various other 'side' events including a special Ohinakko (おひなっこ列車) train service taking visitors to the Yashima hina doll exhibition sites on the Yurikōgen Railway (由利高原鉄道). Altogether roughly 1000 items will be on display in various museums, art museums, and private houses.

The event in 2010 was extended further with additional displays at new locations and houses. Tour companies in Sendai offered package tours. This included a tour operated by railway company JR East. The festival received coverage in the media such as a feature article in the Sakigake newspaper. A dedicated blog was also set up by Akita Prefecture to promote the event.

== The Yurihonjō doll displays ==
The Hina doll displays in this event vary greatly in size, history and style. For example, the historical dolls on display at the Ooi House (大井家) in Yashima; or the comical servant figures at the Ouchi Denshokan (大内伝承館) or the 'oshie' Hina pictures at the Iwaki Local History Museum (岩城歴史民俗資料館, Iwaki Rekishi Minzoku Shiryōkan).

The Yurihonjō Hinakaidō is coordinated by the Akita Prefecture Yuri Regional Development Office (秋田県由利地域振興局).

== Exhibition halls ==
- Honjō Kyodoshiryōkan (本荘郷土資料館)
- Iwaki Local History Museum (岩城歴史民俗資料館, Iwaki Rekishi Minzoku Shiryōkan)
- Kameda Castle Sato Yasohachi Art Museum (亀田城佐藤八十八美術館, Kamedajō Satō Yasohachi Bijutsukan)
- Ouchi Denshokan (大内伝承館)
- Yashima Kyodo Bunka Hozon Denshu Shisetsu (矢島郷土文化保存伝習施設)

== See also ==
- Hinamatsuri
- Yurihonjō
