= Nishime Station =

Railway station in Yurihonjō, Akita Prefecture, Japan

Nishime Station 西目駅
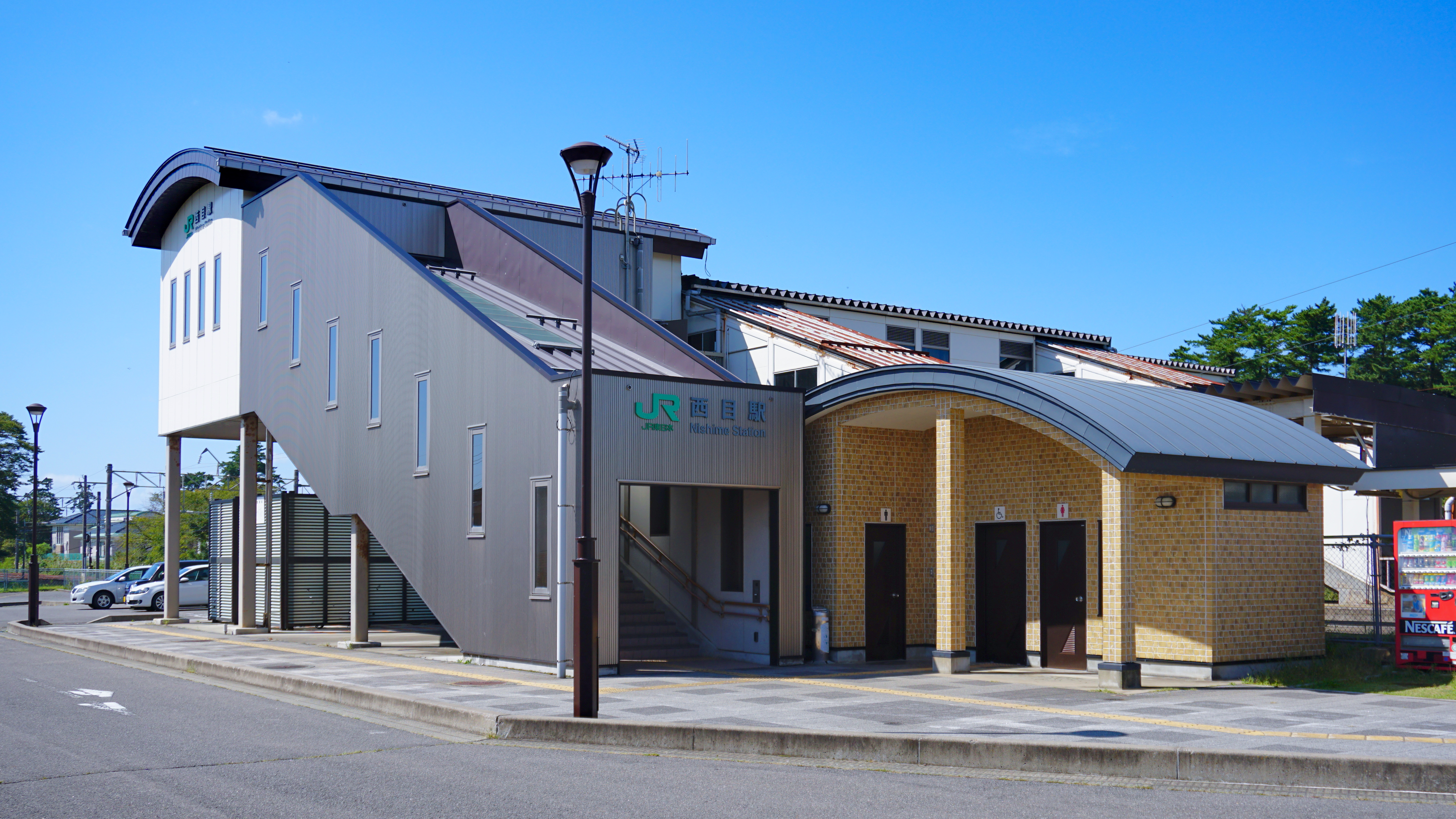
- Nishime Station in 2018

General information
- Location: 8-5 Bentenmae, Nishimemachi-Numata, Yurihonjō-shi, Akita-ken 018-0604; Japan
- Coordinates: 39°20′51.1″N 140°1′6.7″E
- Operator: JR East
- Line: ■ Uetsu Main Line
- Distance: 223.1 kilometers from Niitsu
- Platforms: 1 island + side platform

Other information
- Status: Unstaffed station
- Website: Official website

History
- Opened: June 30, 1922

Passengers
- FY2018: 294

Services
Preceding station	JR East	Following station
Nikaho towards Niitsu	Uetsu Main Line	Ugo-Honjō towards Akita
Location
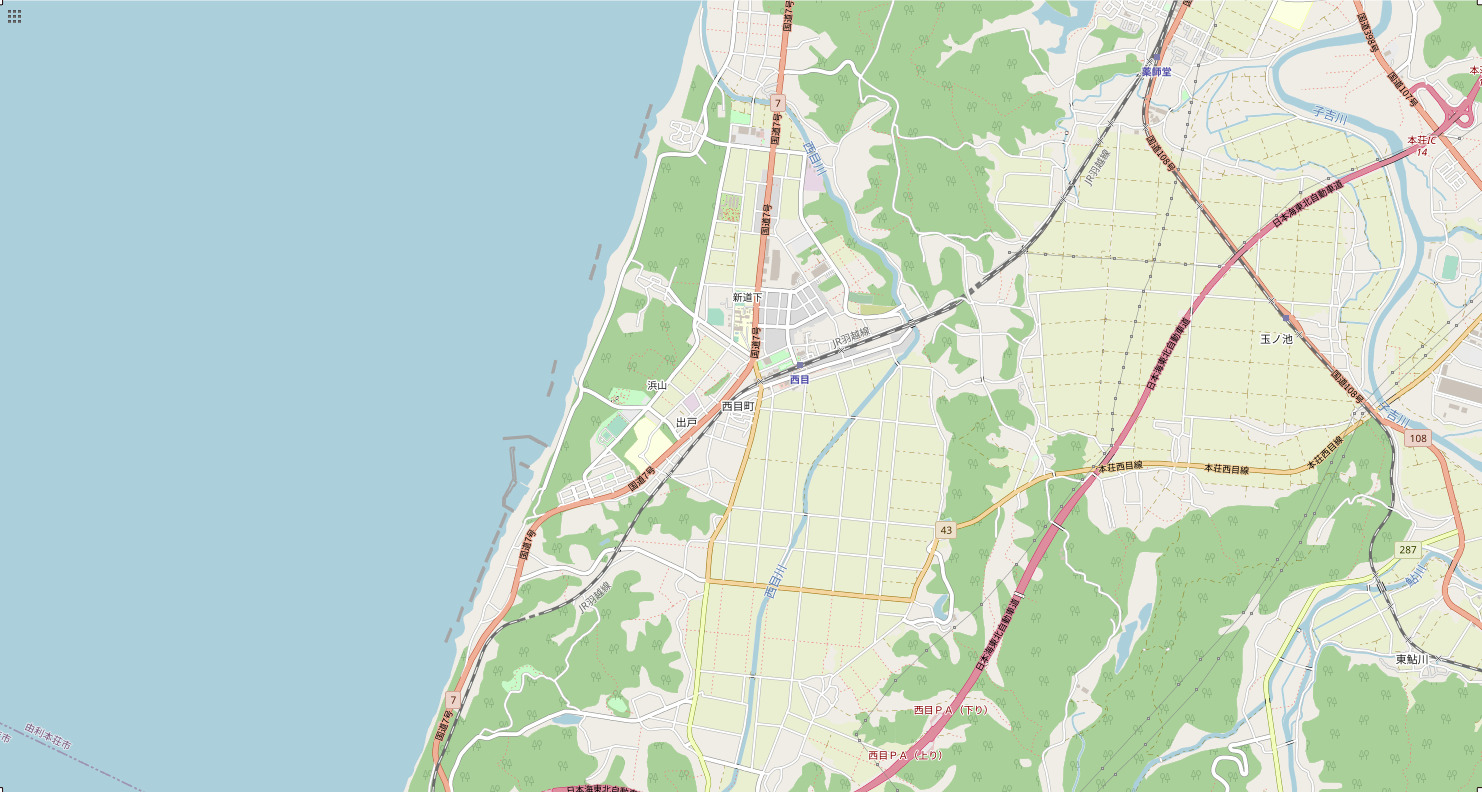
- Location within Nishime, Akita Location within Akita Prefecture Location within Japan

Nishime Station (西目駅, Nishime eki) is a railway station in the city of Yurihonjō, Akita Prefecture, Japan, operated by JR East.

== Lines ==
Nishime Station is served by the Uetsu Main Line, and is located 223.1 kilometres (138.6 mi) from the terminus of the line at Niitsu Station.

== Station layout ==
The station has one side platform and one island platform connected by a footbridge. The station is unstaffed.

=== Platforms ===
1	■ Uetsu Main Line	for Ugo-Honjō and Sakata
2	■ Uetsu Main Line	for Akita
3	■ Uetsu Main Line	siding

== History ==
Nishime Station opened on June 30, 1922, as a station on the Japanese Government Railways (JGR) Rikuusai Line, serving the village of Nishime, Akita. It was switched to the control of the JGR Uetsu Main Line on April 20, 1924. The JGR became the JNR (Japan National Railway) after World War II. With the privatization of the JNR on April 1, 1987, the station came under the control of the East Japan Railway Company. A new station building was completed in February 2006.

== Passenger statistics ==
In fiscal 2018, the station was used by an average of 294 passengers daily (boarding passengers only).

== Surrounding area ==
- National Route 7

== See also ==
- List of railway stations in Japan
