= Yashima Station (Akita) =

Railway station in Yurihonjō, Akita Prefecture, Japan

Yashima Station 矢島駅
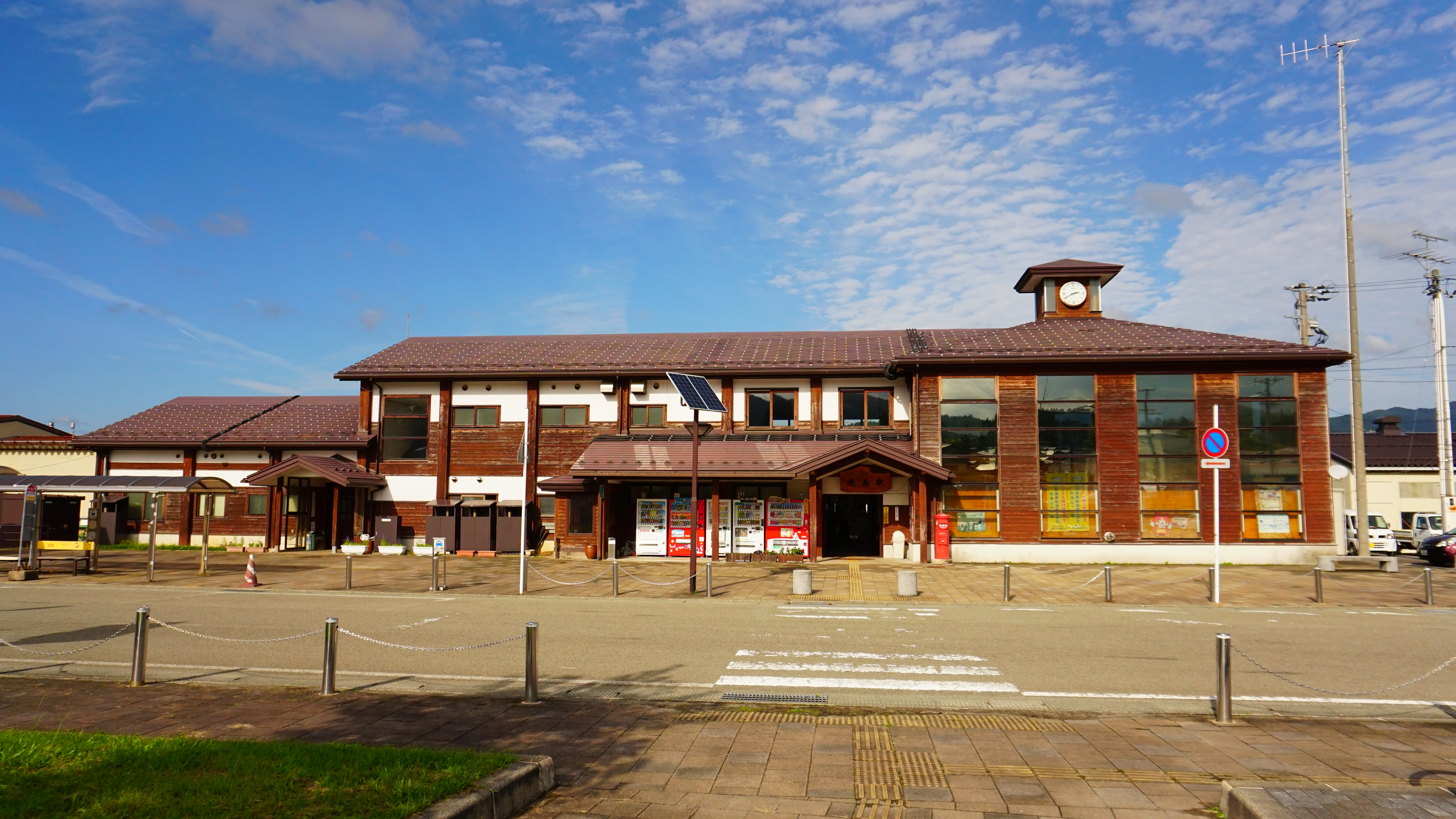
- Yashima Station, September 2018)

General information
- Location: Hazaka, Yashimamachi-Nanokamachi, Yurihonjō-shi, Akita-ken; Japan
- Coordinates: 39.230346°N 140.138852°E
- Operator: Yuri Kōgen Railway
- Line: ■ Yuri Kōgen Railway Chōkai Sanroku Line
- Distance: 23.0 km from Ugo-Honjō
- Platforms: 1 side platform

Other information
- Status: Staffed

History
- Opened: October 21, 1938
- Former names: Ugo-Yashima (to 1985)

Passengers
- FY2018: 311
Location
- Location within Akita Prefecture Location within Japan

Yashima Station (矢島駅, Yashima-eki) is a railway station in the city of Yurihonjō, Akita Prefecture, Japan, operated by the third-sector railway operator Yuri Kōgen Railway.

== Lines ==
Yashima Station is a terminus of the Chōkai Sanroku Line, and is located 23.0 kilometers from the opposing terminus of the line at Ugo-Honjō Station.

== Station layout ==
The station one side platform, with trains arriving at the station reversing direction for departure. The station also has the rail yard for the Chōkai Sanroku Line.

== Adjacent stations ==
«	Service	»
Yuri Kōgen Railway Chōkai Sanroku Line
Kawabe	Local	Terminus

== History ==
Yashima Station opened on October 21, 1938, as Ugo-Yashima Station (羽後矢島駅, Ugo-Yashima eki) on the Japanese Government Railways (JGR) Yashima Line, serving the former town of Yashima, Akita. The JGR became the Japan National Railway (JNR) after World War II. All freight operations were discontinued from June 10, 1981. The Yashima Line was privatized on 1 October 1985, becoming the Yuri Kōgen Railway Chōkai Sanroku Line, and the station was renamed to its present name at that time. A new station building was completed on September 25, 2009.

== Surrounding area ==
- Yashima High School
- Yashima Junior High School
- Yashima Elementary School

== See also ==
- List of railway stations in Japan
