= Nishime (surname) =

Nishime (written: 西銘) is a Japanese surname. Notable people with the surname include:

- Junji Nishime (西銘 順治, 1921–2001), Japanese politician
- Kosaburo Nishime (西銘 恒三郎, born 1954), Japanese politician
- Shun Nishime (西銘 駿, born 1998), Japanese model and actor
