= Ugo-Honjō Station =

Railway station in Yurihonjō, Akita Prefecture, Japan

Ugo-Honjō Station 羽後本荘駅
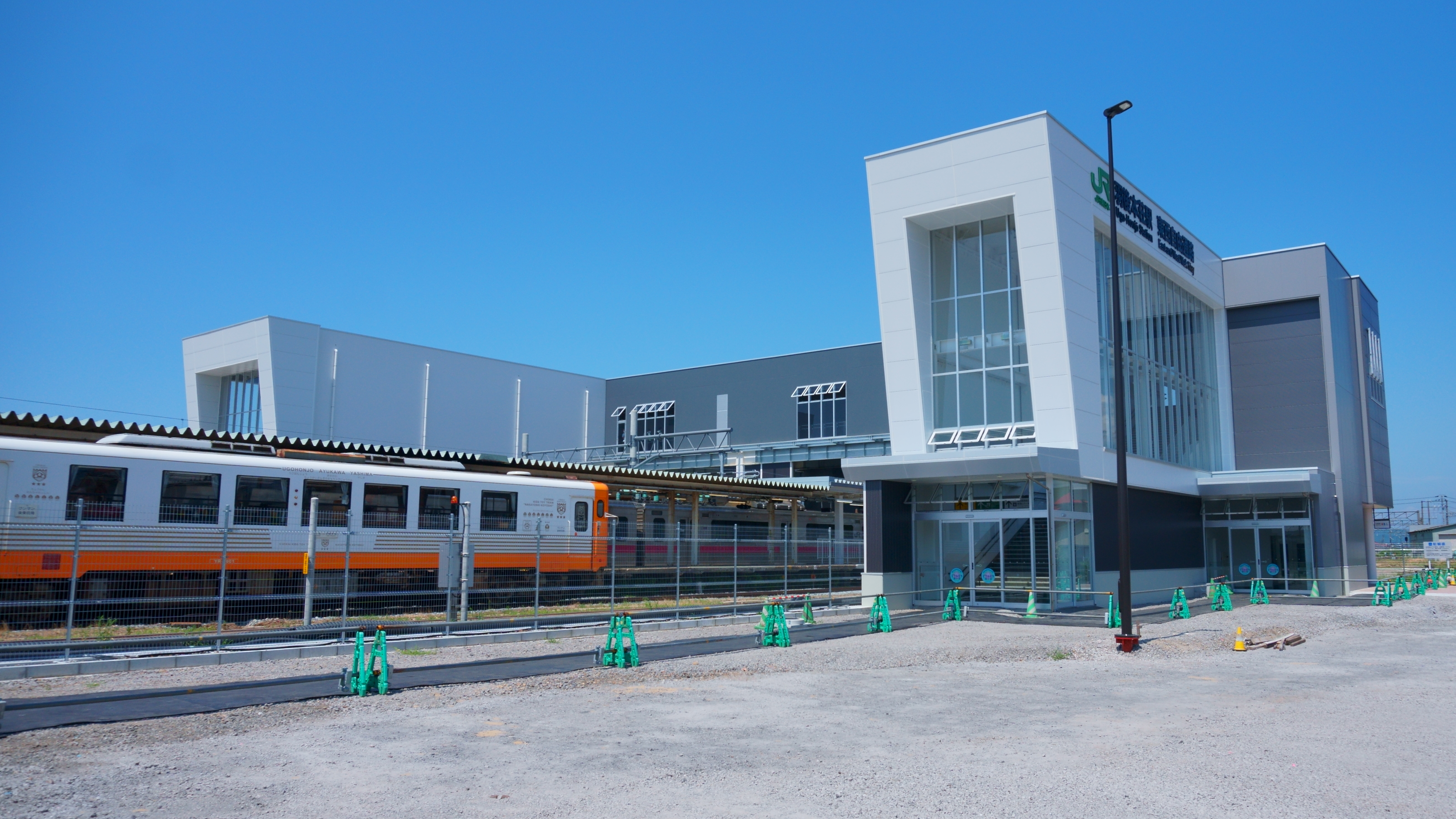
- Ugo-Honjo-Station, August 2021

General information
- Location: 85-1 Nishi-Bonten, Yurihonjō-shi, Akita-ken 015-0858; Japan
- Coordinates: 39°23′11.8″N 140°3′26″E
- Operator: JR East; Yuri Kōgen Railway; JR Freight
- Lines: ■ Uetsu Main Line; ■ Yuri Kōgen Railway Chōkai Sanroku Line
- Distance: 228.9 kilometers from Niitsu
- Platforms: 2 island platforms

Other information
- Status: Staffed (Stations with reserved seat ticket vending machines where you can talk)
- Website: Official website

History
- Opened: 30 June 1922

Passengers
- FY2021 (JR East); FY2018 (Yuri Kōgen): 870 (JR East); 277 (Yuri Kōgen)

Services
Preceding station	JR East	Following station
Nikaho towards Niigata	Inaho	Akita Terminus
Nishime towards Niitsu	Uetsu Main Line	Ugo-Iwaya towards Akita
Preceding station	Yuri Kōgen Railway	Following station
Terminus	Chōkai Sanroku Line	Yakushidō towards Yashima
Location
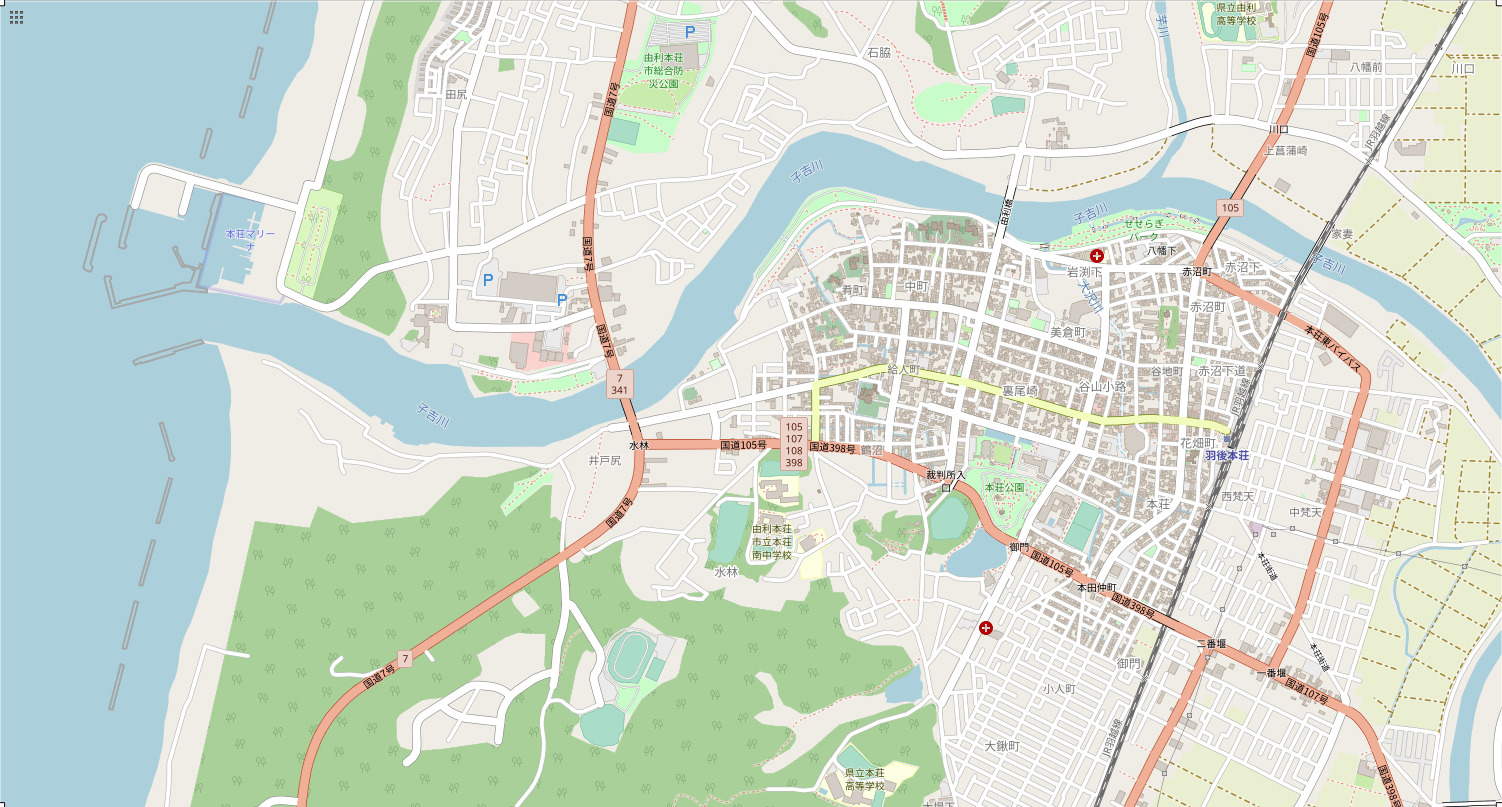
- Location within Honjo, Akita Location within Akita Prefecture Location within Japan

Ugo-Honjō Station (羽後本荘駅, Ugo-Honjō-eki) is an interchange railway station in the city of Yurihonjō, Akita Prefecture, Japan, jointly operated by East Japan Railway Company (JR East) and the third-sector Yuri Kōgen Railway. It is also a freight terminal for the Japan Freight Railway Company (JR Freight).

== Lines ==
Ugo-Honjō Station is served by the Uetsu Main Line, and is located 228.9 kilometres (142.2 mi) from the terminus of the line at Niitsu Station. It is also the terminal station for the Yuri Kōgen Railway Chōkai Sanroku Line and is 23.0 kilometers from the opposing terminus of the line at Yashima Station.

== Station layout ==
Ugo-Honjō Station has two island platforms serving four tracks, connected by a footbridge. The station has a Talking reserved seat ticket vending machine.

=== Platforms ===
1	■ Uetsu Main Line	for Akita
2	■ Uetsu Main Line	for Niigata and Sakata
3	■ Uetsu Main Line	trains originating at Ugo-Honjō
4	■ Yuri Kōgen Railway Chōkai Sanroku Line	for Yashima

== History ==
Ugo-Honjō Station opened on 30 June 1922. The Yashima Line was privatized on 1 October 1985, becoming the Yuri Kōgen Railway Chōkai Sanroku Line. With the privatization of JNR on 1 April 1987, the station came under the control of the East Japan Railway Company.

== Passenger statistics ==
In fiscal 2018, the JR East portion of the station was used by an average of 1088 passengers daily (boarding passengers only), and the Yuri Kōgen Railway portion by 293 passengers.

== Surrounding area ==
- Honjō city center

== See also ==
- List of railway stations in Japan
