= Japan National Route 108 =

National highway in Japan

National Route 108
- 国道108号
- Japan National Route 108 highlighted in red
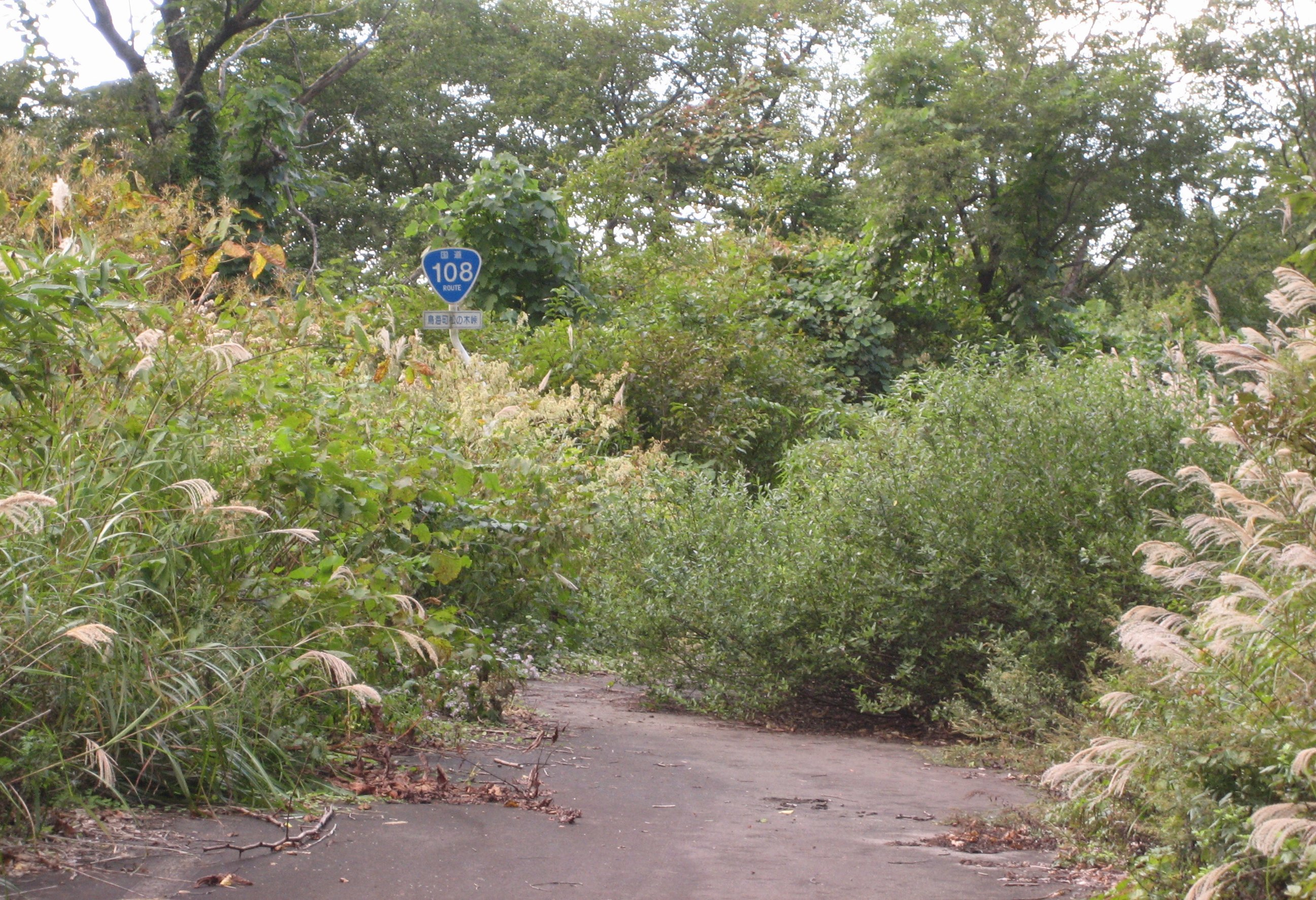

Route information
- Length: 186.9 km (116.1 mi)
- Existed: 1953–present

Major junctions
- South end: National Route 45 in Ishinomaki, Miyagi
- National Route 346; National Route 4; National Route 47; National Route 13; National Route 105
- North end: National Route 107 in Yurihonjō, Akita

Location
- Country: Japan

Highway system
- National highways of Japan; Expressways of Japan
← National Route 107	→ National Route 112

National Route 108 is a national highway of Japan connecting Ishinomaki and Yurihonjō, Akita in Japan, with a total length of 186.9 kilometers (116.1 mi).

== History ==
Route 108 was originally designated on 18 May 1953 as a route from Ishinomaki to Shinbori (now Sakata) via Furukawa (now Osaki). On 1 April 1963, the route was shortened to Furukawa and rerouted to Yokote, replacing Route 109; the original route to Sakata was incorporated into Route 47. On 1 April 1970, the northern terminus was moved to Honjo (now Yurihonjō).
