= Honjo =

Honjō or Honjo may refer to:

== Places ==
- Honjō, Akita
- Honjo-azumabashi Station
- Honjō Castle
- Honjō Domain
- Honjō, Nagano
- Honjō, Ōita
- Honjō, Saitama
  - Honjō Station (Saitama)
- Honjō Shrine
- Honjo Stadium
- Honjō Station (Fukui)
- Honjō Station (Fukuoka)
- Honjo, Tokyo
- Honjo, Yutaro
- Honjō-Waseda Station
- Honjō Kofun Cluster
- Bingo-Honjō Station
- Ugo-Honjō Station

== People ==
- Kiro Honjo (本庄 季郎; 1901–1990), Japanese aircraft designer
- Kōrō Honjō (本庄 光郎; 1907-1995), Japanese photographer
- Honjō Saneyori (本庄 実乃; 1511? – 1575?), Japanese samurai and commander
- Honjō Shigenaga (本庄 繁長; 1540–1614), Japanese samurai
- Shigeru Honjō (本庄 繁; 1876–1945), Japanese general
- Tasuku Honjo (本庶 佑; born 1942), Japanese immunologist

=== Fictional characters ===
- Honjō Kamatari from Rurouni Kenshin
- Mika Honjō from Ginban Kaleidoscope
- Ren Honjo from Nana

== Others ==
- Honjō-shuku was the tenth of the sixty-nine stations of the Nakasendō
