= Rokugō Masakane =

Viscount Rokugō Masakane
- 六郷政鑑
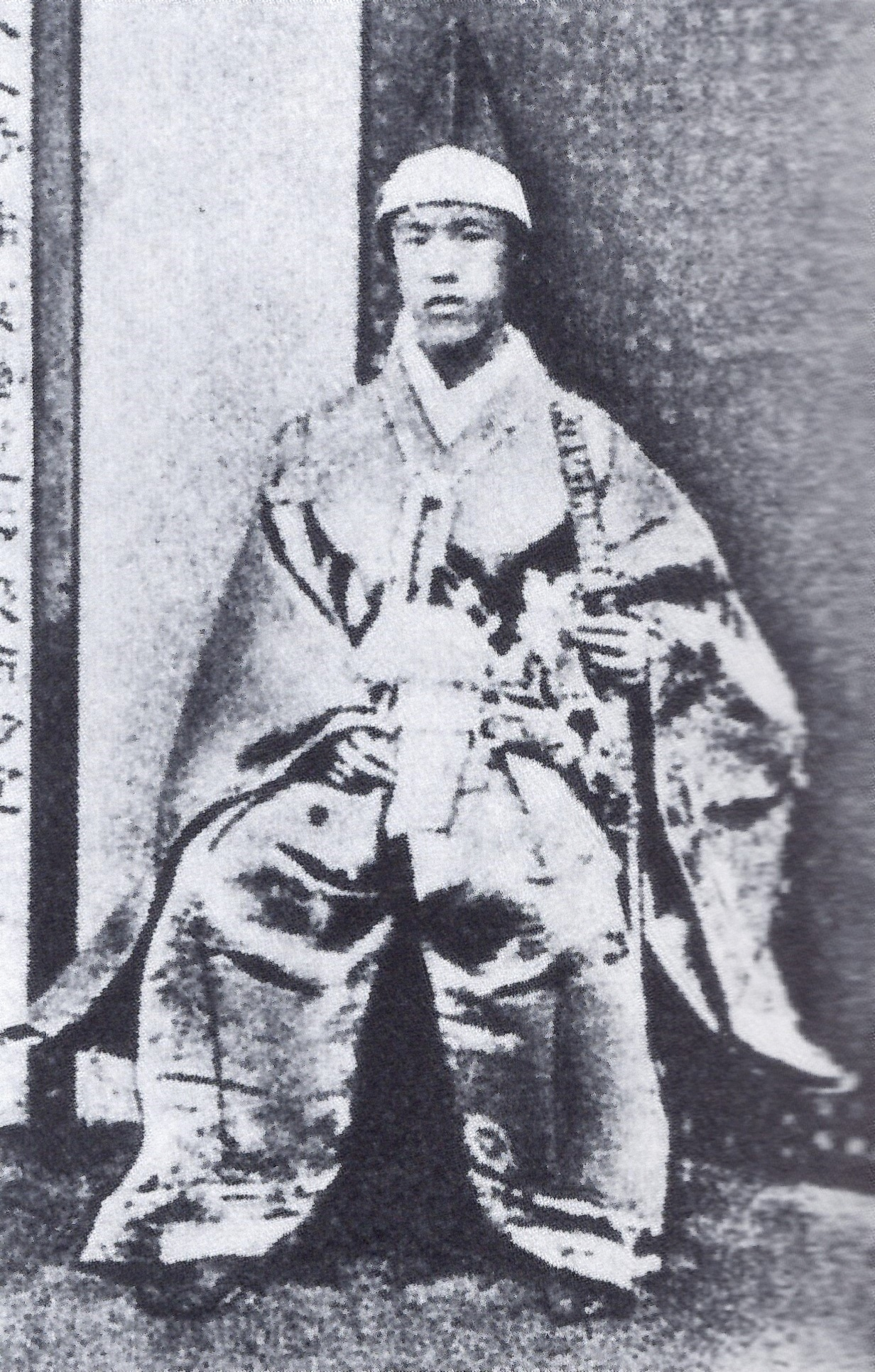
- Rokugō Masakane

11th Daimyō of Honjō Domain
- In office 1861–1868
- Monarchs: Shōgun: Tokugawa Iemochi; Tokugawa Yoshinobu
- Preceded by: Rokugō Masatada
- Succeeded by: < position abolished >

Imperial Governor of Honjō
- In office 1869–1871
- Monarch: Emperor Meiji

Personal details
- Born: October 29, 1848
- Died: July 23, 1907 (aged 58); Honjō, Akita, Japan
- Parent: Rokugō Masatada (father)

Rokugō Masakane (六郷政鑑; October 29, 1848 – July 23, 1907) was the 11th (and final) daimyō of Honjō Domain in Dewa Province, Honshū, Japan (modern-day Akita Prefecture). His courtesy title before the Meiji restoration was Hyōgō-gashira, and his Court rank was Junior Fifth Rank, Lower Grade. His name is also sometimes transliterated as Rokugō Masaakira.

== Biography ==
Rokugō Masakane was the eldest son of Rokugō Masatada and became daimyō in 1861 on the death of his father. he was received in formal audience by Shōgun Tokugawa Iemochi in 1862. In 1866, he was assigned to the guard of Edo Castle. In early 1868, with the start of the Boshin War of the Meiji restoration, he led his domain into the pro-Tokugawa Ōuetsu Reppan Dōmei, however, after only a few months, he switched sides to the imperial cause. The new Meiji government ordered him to participate in the campaign against Shōnai Domain; however, the domain had only a very weak military capability and obsolete weapons. The much stronger Shōnai forces not only easily repulsed his attack, but counterattacked and burned down Honjō Castle. Rokugō Masakane fled to Kubota Domain, where the government awarded him 3000 ryō in compensation. Meiji government forces recovered Honjō two months later. At the end of the war, he was rewarded with an increase in kokudaka of 10,000 koku.

In June 1869, he was appointed imperial governor. With the abolition of the han system in 1871, he relocated to Tokyo. In 1884 he became a viscount (shisaku) under the kazoku peerage system. In his final years, he returned to Honjō. He died in 1907 at the age of 46. His court rank was posthumously elevated to Upper Third Rank.

Rokugō Masakane's wife was a younger daughter of Okabe Nagahira daimyō of Kishiwada Domain. He was succeeded as chieftain of the Rokugō clan and as viscount by his eldest son, Rokugō Masakata (1872-1926).

His grave is at the temple of Eizen-ji in Yurihonjō, Akita Prefecture.
