= Yoritsune =

- Pronunciation: joɾitsɯne (IPA)
- Gender: Male

Origin
- Origin: Japanese
- Meaning: Different meanings depending on the kanji used

Other names
- Alternative spelling: Yoritune (Kunrei-shiki) Yoritune (Nihon-shiki) Yoritsune (Hepburn)

Yoritsune is a masculine Japanese given name.

== Written forms ==
Yoritsune can be written using many different combinations of kanji characters. Here are some examples:

- 頼常, "rely, usual"
- 頼恒, "rely, always"
- 頼毎, "rely, every"
- 依常, "to depend on, usual"
- 依恒, "to depend on, always"
- 依毎, "to depend on, every"

The name can also be written in hiragana よりつね or katakana ヨリツネ.

== Notable people with the name ==
- Yoritsune Kujo (九条 頼経) (1218–1256), Japanese shōgun
- Yoritsune Matsudaira (松平 頼則) (1907–2001), Japanese classical composer
