= Fuchū Domain =

There were three hans or feudal domains in Japan called 府中藩 (Fuchū)

- Sunpu Domain in Shizuoka, Shizuoka Prefecture
- Fuchū Domain (Hitachi) in Ishioka, Ibaraki Prefecture
- Fuchū Domain (Tsushima) in Tsushima, Nagasaki Prefecture
