= Yoritsune Matsudaira =

Japanese composer

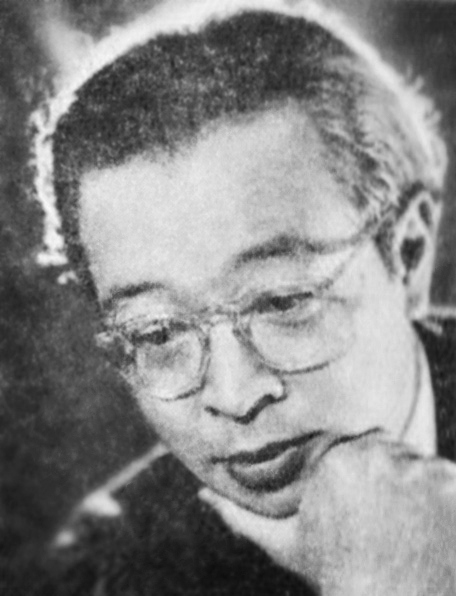
- Born: May 5, 1907; Japan Tokyo
- Died: October 25, 2001 (aged 94); Japan Tokyo
- Other name: 松平 頼則
- Occupation: composer
- Children: Yoriaki (Yori'Aki) Matsudaira (composer)

Yoritsune Matsudaira (松平 頼則, Matsudaira Yoritsune; May 5, 1907, Tokyo, Japan – October 25 or October 30, 2001 in Tokyo, Japan) was a Japanese composer of contemporary classical music.

Matsudaira was descended, on his father's side of the family, from the Matsudaira clan, related to the Tokugawa clan who ruled Japan as shōgun during the Edo period (specifically from the branch of the family which was enfeoffed at the Hitachi-Fuchū Domain), and on his mother's side of the family from the Fujiwara clan, who were court regents from the 7th to the 12th centuries. His style was influenced by gagaku, the ancient court music of Japan. His music has been frequently performed in Europe.

His eldest son, Yoriaki (Yori'Aki) Matsudaira (松平 頼暁) was also a composer.

== Works ==
=== Opera ===
- Genji-Monogatari The Tale of Genji (1990–93)
- Uji-jujo [The ten Chapters of Uji] (1998)

=== Orchestral ===
- Pastorale (1935)
- Tema e variazioni sul tema di Etenraku per pianoforte e orchestra (1951)
- Figures sonores (1956)
- U-mai (1957)
- Sa-mai (1958)
- Suite di danze nelle stile dell'antico "Bugaku" giapponese (1959)
- Sinfonietta (1961)
- Bugaku per orchestra da camera (1962)
- Tre movimenti per pianoforte e orchestra (1962)
- Danza rituale e finale (1963)
- Concerto per pianoforte e orchestra (1964)
- Concerto da camera per clavicembalo, arpa e strumenti (1964)
- Prelude (1965–66)
- Dialogo coreografico (1966)
- Mouvements circulatoires (1971)
- Portrait C per orchestra da camera (1977)
- Concerto per pianoforte e orchestra n. 2 (1979–80)
- Concertino per pianoforte e orchestra (1988)
- Concerto per pianoforte e orchestra n. 3 (2001)

=== Chamber/Instrumental ===
- Souvenirs d'enfance pour piano (1928–30)
- Prélude en ré pour piano (1934)
- Sonatine pour flûte et piano (1940)
- Prélude en sol pour piano (1940)
- Sonatine pour flûte et clarinet (1940)
- Sonata per violoncello e pianoforte (1942)
- Six danses rustiques pour piano (1939–45)
- Sonatine pour piano (1948)
- Sonata per violino e pianoforte (1948)
- Pianoforte trio per pianoforte, violino e violoncello (1948)
- Sonata per pianoforte (1949)
- Quartetto d'archi n. 1 (1949)
- Quartetto d'archi n. 2 (1951)
- Somaksah per flauto solo (1961)
- Serenata per flauto e strumenti (1962)
- Portrait per due pianoforti (1968)
- Dodici pezzi facile per pianoforte (1968–69)
- Portrait B per due pianoforti e due percussionisti (1969)
- Pièces de piano pour les enfants par les chansons des enfants et populaires (1969)
- Pièces de piano pour les enfants par les chansons de enfants (1970)
- Etudes pour piano d'apres modes japonais (1970)
- Le beau Japon pour piano (1970)
- Somaksah per arpa o pianoforte (1970)
- Somaksah per oboe (1970)
- Somaksah per percussione (1970)
- Sonatine pour guitare (197?)
- 6 Préludes pour piano en forme de thème et variations (1975)
- Concerto per gagaku (1975)
- 6 diapason per pianoforte e arpa (1978)
- Rapsodia per 10 strumenti (1983)
- Tema e variazioni sul tema di Etenraku per pianoforte (1983)

=== Vocal ===
- Chansons populaires de Nanbu I (1928–30)
- Chansons populaires de Nanbu II (1938)
- Metamorfosi per soprano e strumenti (1953)
- Koromogae per voce e strumenti (1954)
- Katsura pour chant avec flûte, clavecin, harpe, guitar et percussions (1959)
- Roei jisei per voce e strumenti (1966)
- 3 Airs du Genji-Monogatari (1990)
- 3 Airs du Genji-Monogatari No.2 (1992)
- Ka-ryo-bin per soprano e orchestra (1996)

== Ancestry ==
Ancestors of Yoritsune Matsudaira

16. Matsudaira Yorihisa
8. Matsudaira Yoritsugu
4. Matsudaira Yorifumi
2. Yorinari Matsudaira
1. Yoritsune Matsudaira
24. Takatsukasa Masamichi
12. Tokudaiji Kin'ito
25. Tokugawa Kiyoko
6. Tokudaiji Sanetsune
3. Haruko Tokudaiji
28. Yamauchi Toyokazu
14. Yamauchi Toyosuke
7. Yamauchi Kaneko
