= Yoriaki Matsudaira =

Japanese composer (1931–2023)

- 松平頼暁
- Born: 27 March 1931; Tokyo, Japan
- Died: 9 January 2023 (aged 91); Tokyo, Japan
- Other names: Yori-Aki Matsudaira

Yoriaki Matsudaira (Japanese: 松平頼暁; 27 March 1931 – 9 January 2023) was a Japanese composer and academic.

== Life and career ==
Born in Tokyo, the son of composer Yoritsune, Matsudaira graduated in biology at Tokyo Metropolitan University and served as professor of physics and biology at the Rikkyo University.

A self-taught composer who used to mix Japanese traditional music with western influences, his variegated production mainly consists of chamber music, but also includes orchestral compositions, incidental music, jazz compositions, electronic music as well as the opera Sara (1960).

During his career Matsudaira received various awards and honors, including an Otaka prize and a Purple Ribbon Medal of Honor. He died of pneumonia on 9 January 2023, at the age of 91.
