= Inaba Shrine =

Shinto shrine in Gifu Prefecture, Japan

Inaba Shrine 伊奈波神社
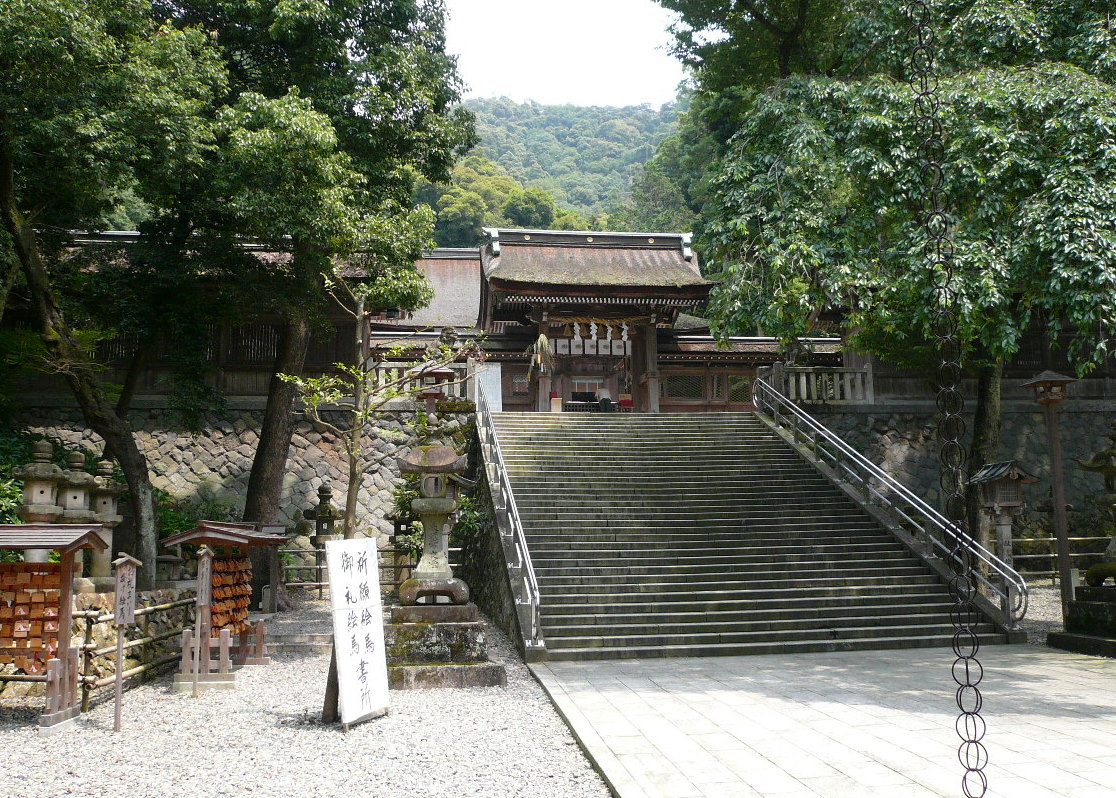
- Shimon leading to the shrine's honden

- Location within Japan

Religion
- Affiliation: Shinto
- Deity: Inishiki-Irihiko-no-mikoto
- Leadership: Hito Higashimichi

Location
- Location: 1-1 Inaba-dōri, Gifu; Gifu 〒500-8043
- Coordinates: 35°25′38.19″N 136°46′14.09″E

Architecture
- Established: 85

Website
- www.inabasan.com

Inaba Shrine (伊奈波神社, Inaba Jinja) is a Shinto shrine located at the base of Mount Kinka in Gifu, Gifu Prefecture, Japan. Originally, its name was written 稲葉神社, which is pronounced the same way. It is the main shrine that is celebrated by the city of Gifu in its annual Gifu Festival on the first Saturday of each April. Because of its size, it is a popular spot for hatsumōde and Shichi-Go-San.

== Enshrined god ==
The god Inishiki-Irihiko-no-mikoto is enshrined and worshipped at Inaba Shrine. He is the husband of the goddess Nunoshihime-no-mikoto enshrined at Kogane Shrine and the father of the god Ichihaya-no-mikoto enshrined at Kashimori Shrine. Because of the connection between the three gods, these three shrines have a very close relationship.

== History ==
First built in the year 85, Inaba Shrine has a history of over 1900 years. Though it was originally located on Maruyama, to the north of Mount Kinka, it was moved to its present location by Saitō Dōsan in 1539.

== Festivals ==
- Setsubun Festival (February 3): Special prayer ceremonies are held at 9:20am and over 100 torches are lit at 6:00pm.
- Gifu Festival (April 5): Held in conjunction with Kashimori and Kogane shrines. (Nearby Honjō Shrine holds their rites on the same day.)

== See also ==
- List of Shinto shrines
- Kashimori Shrine
- Kogane Shrine

== Images ==
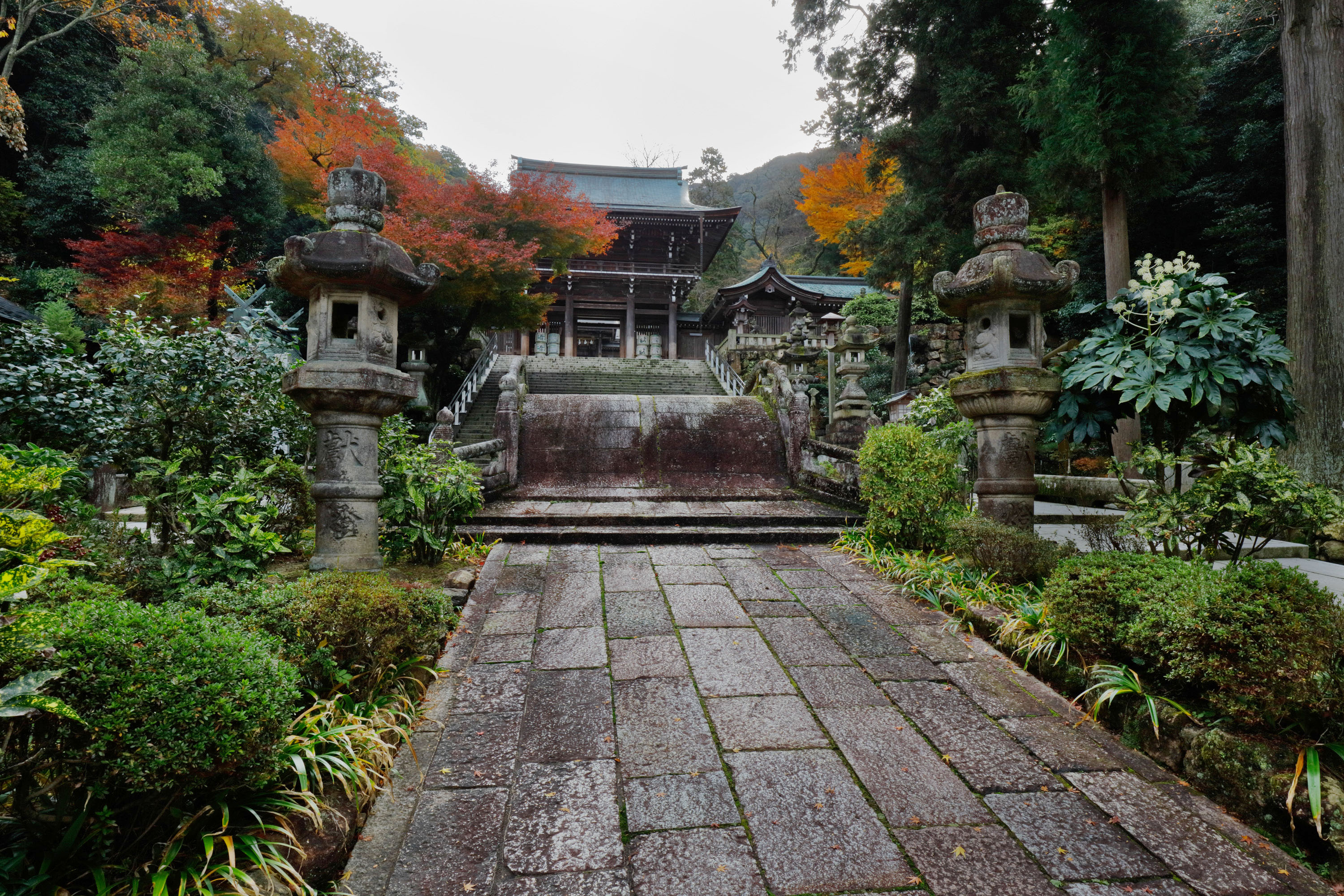

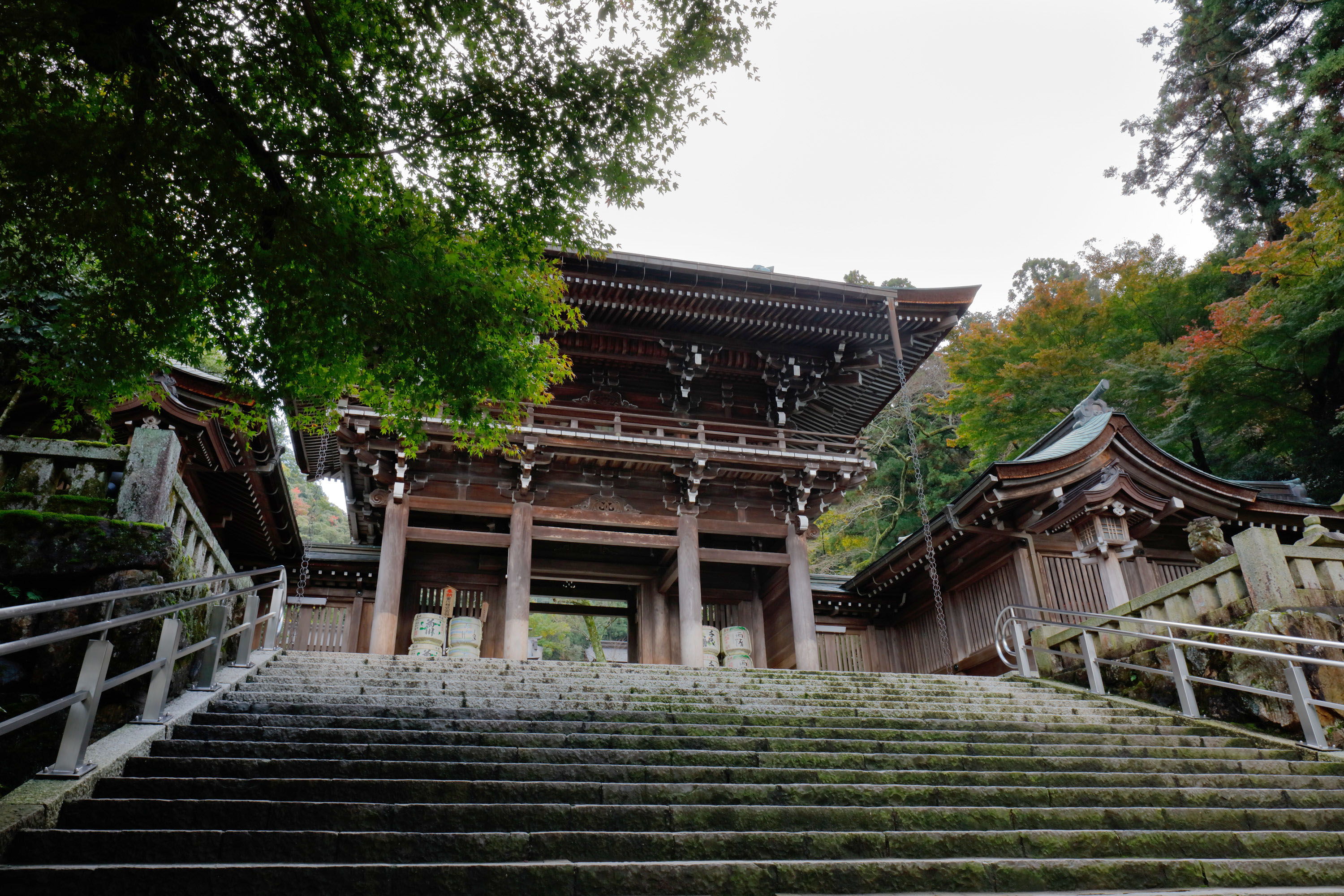

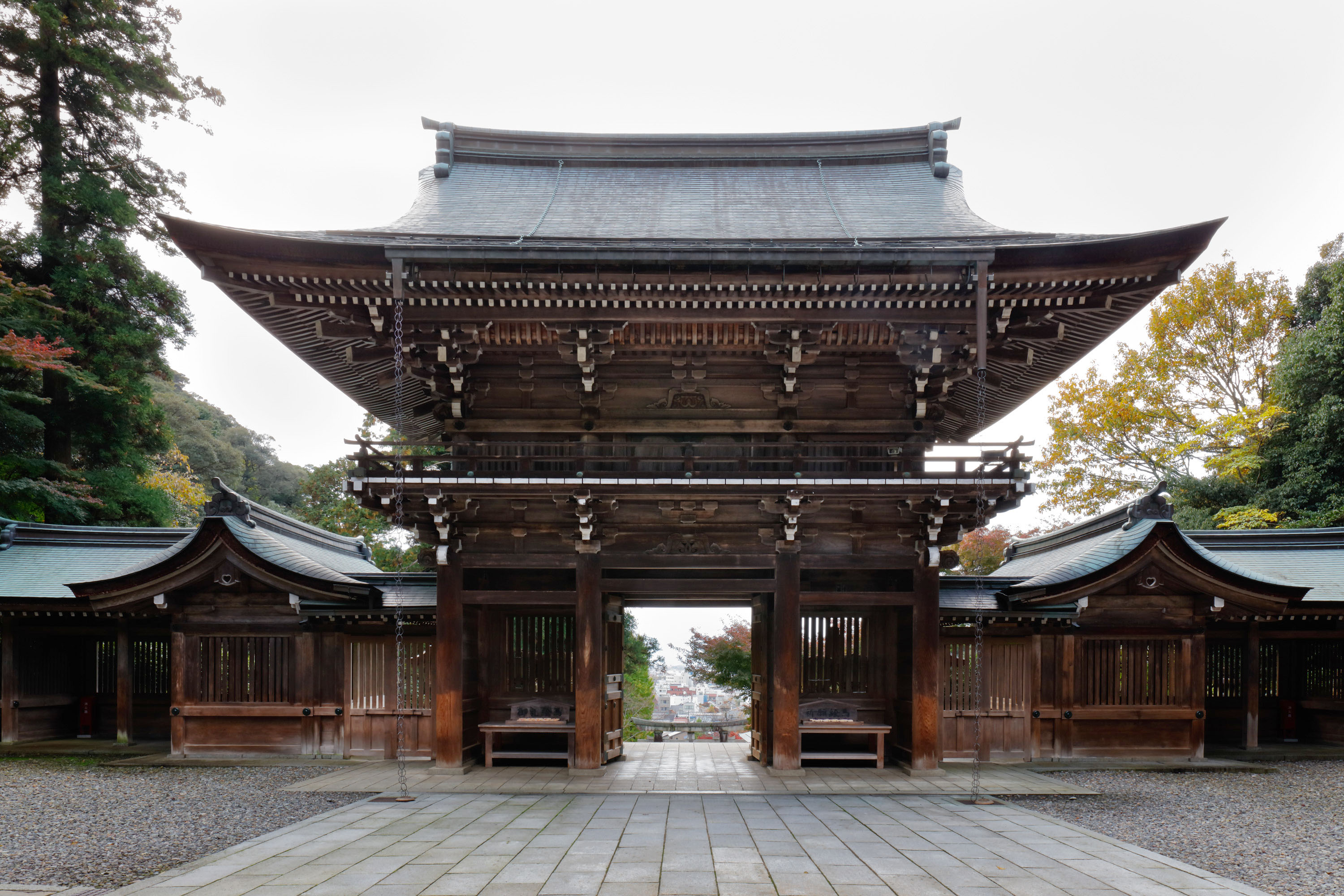

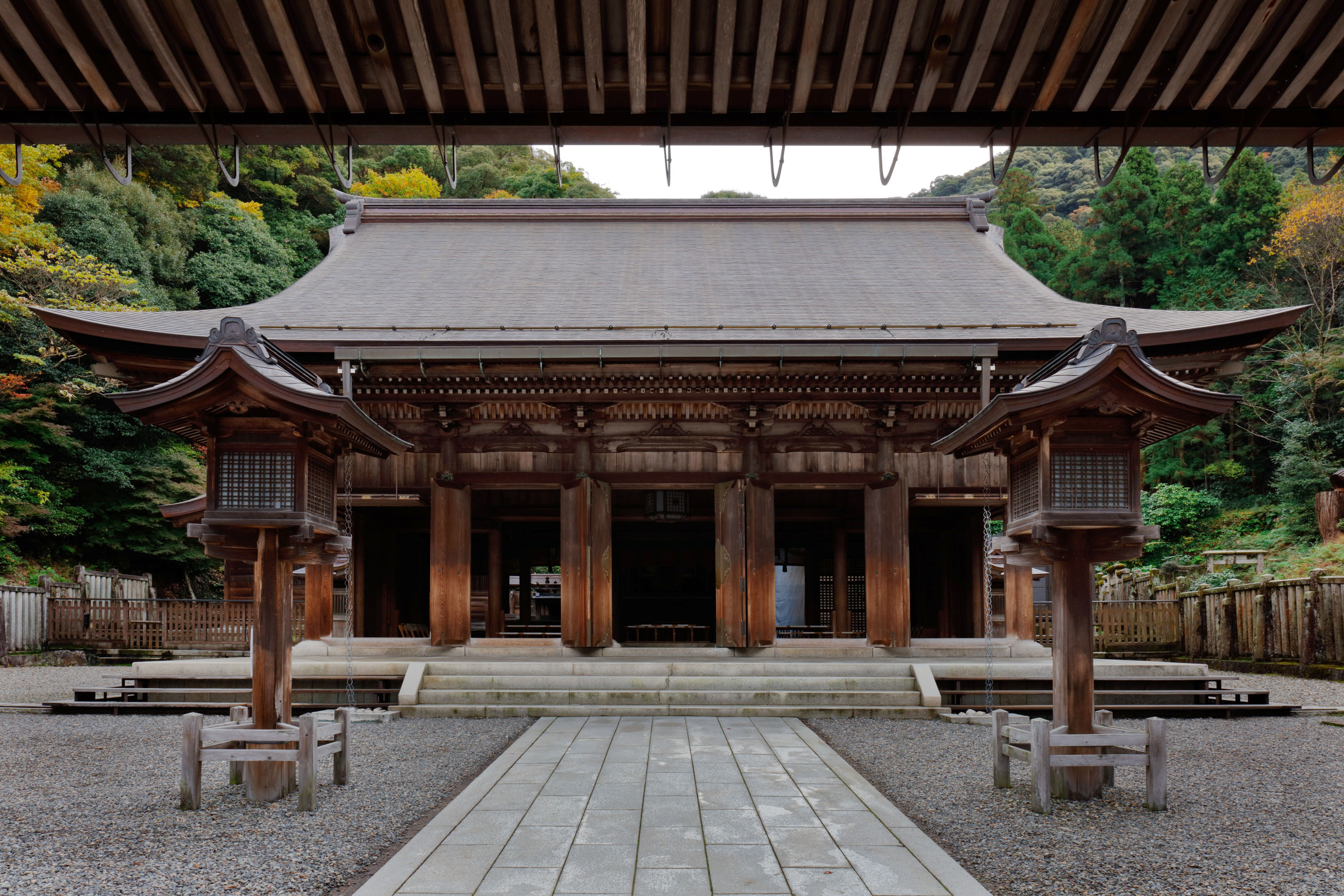

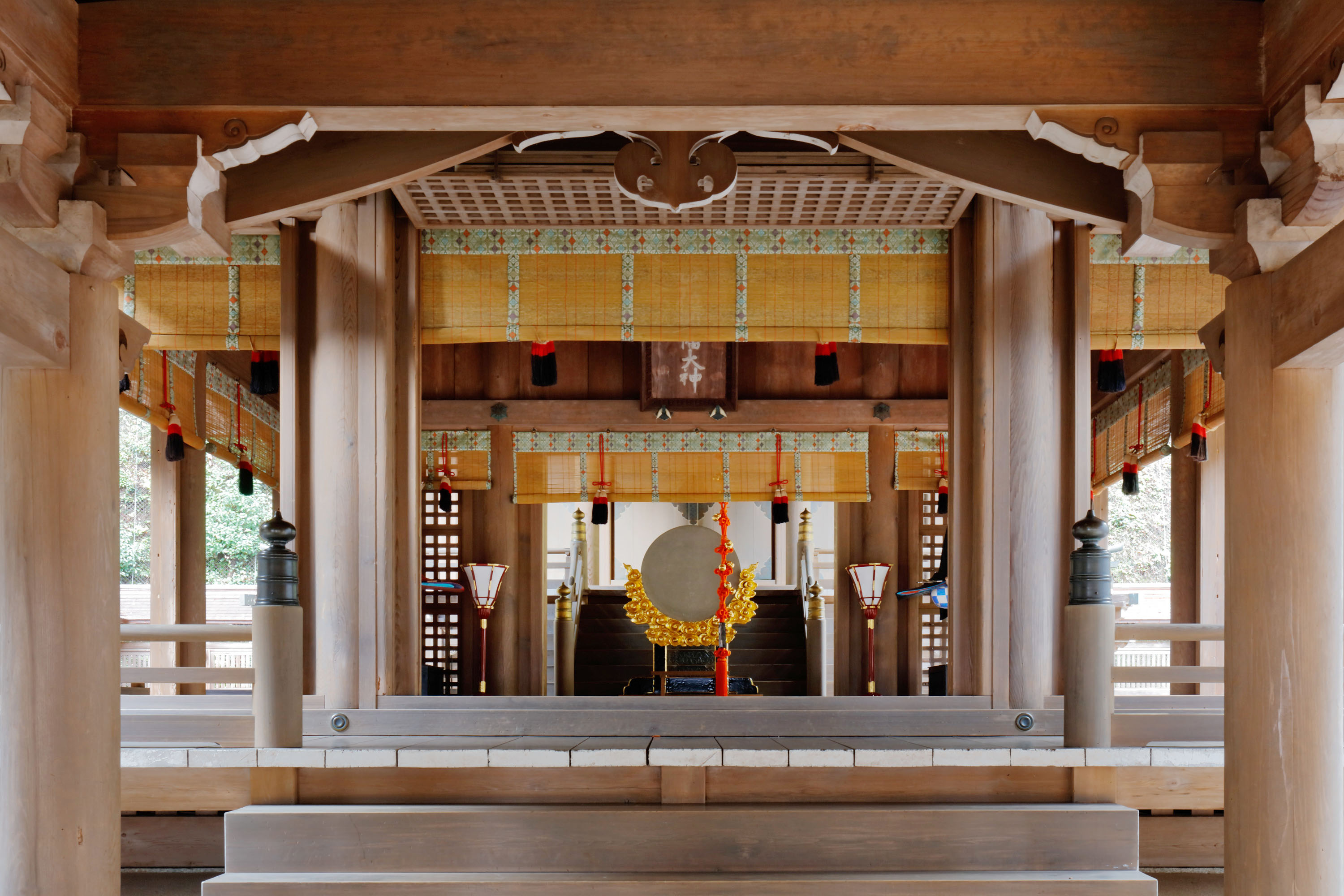

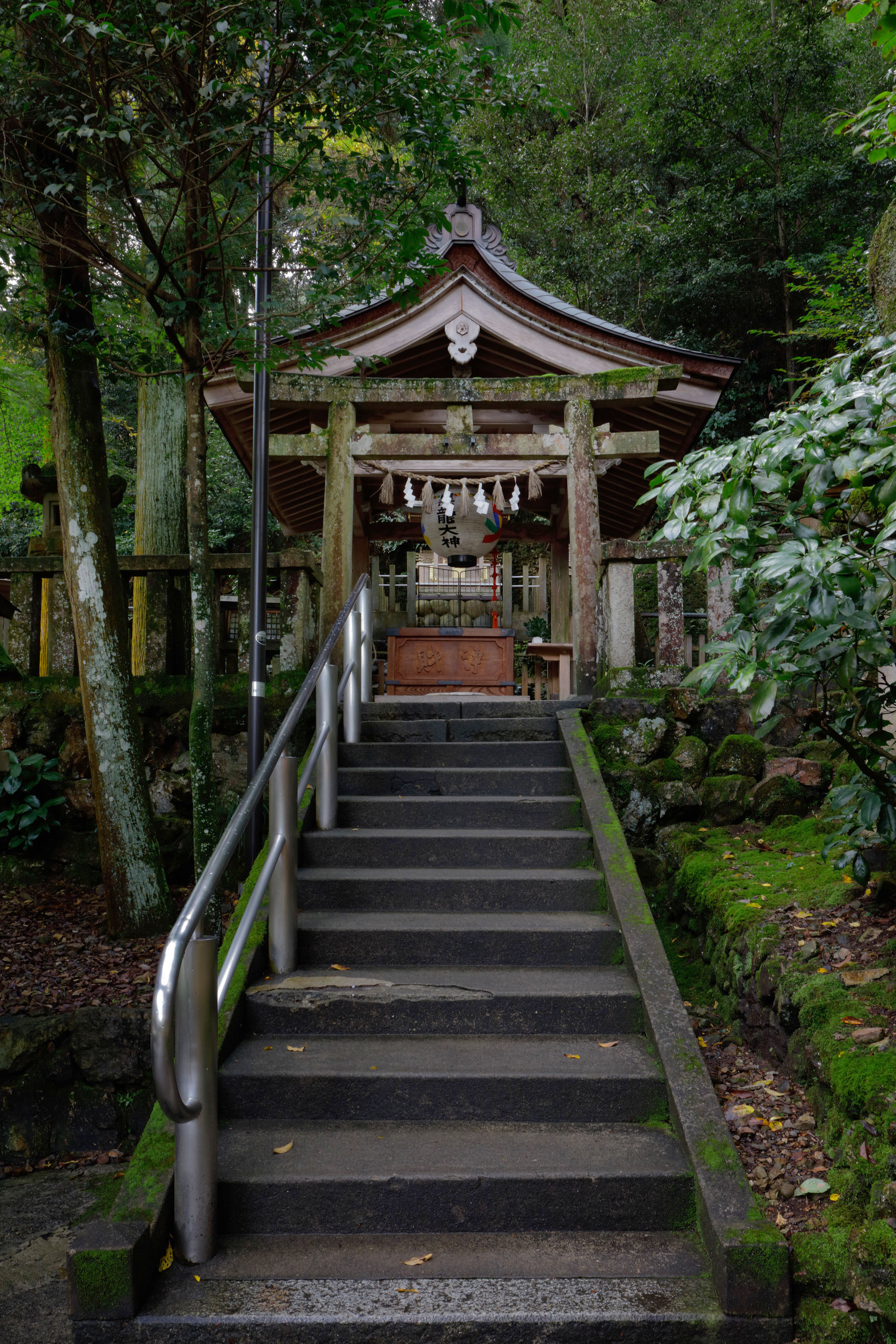

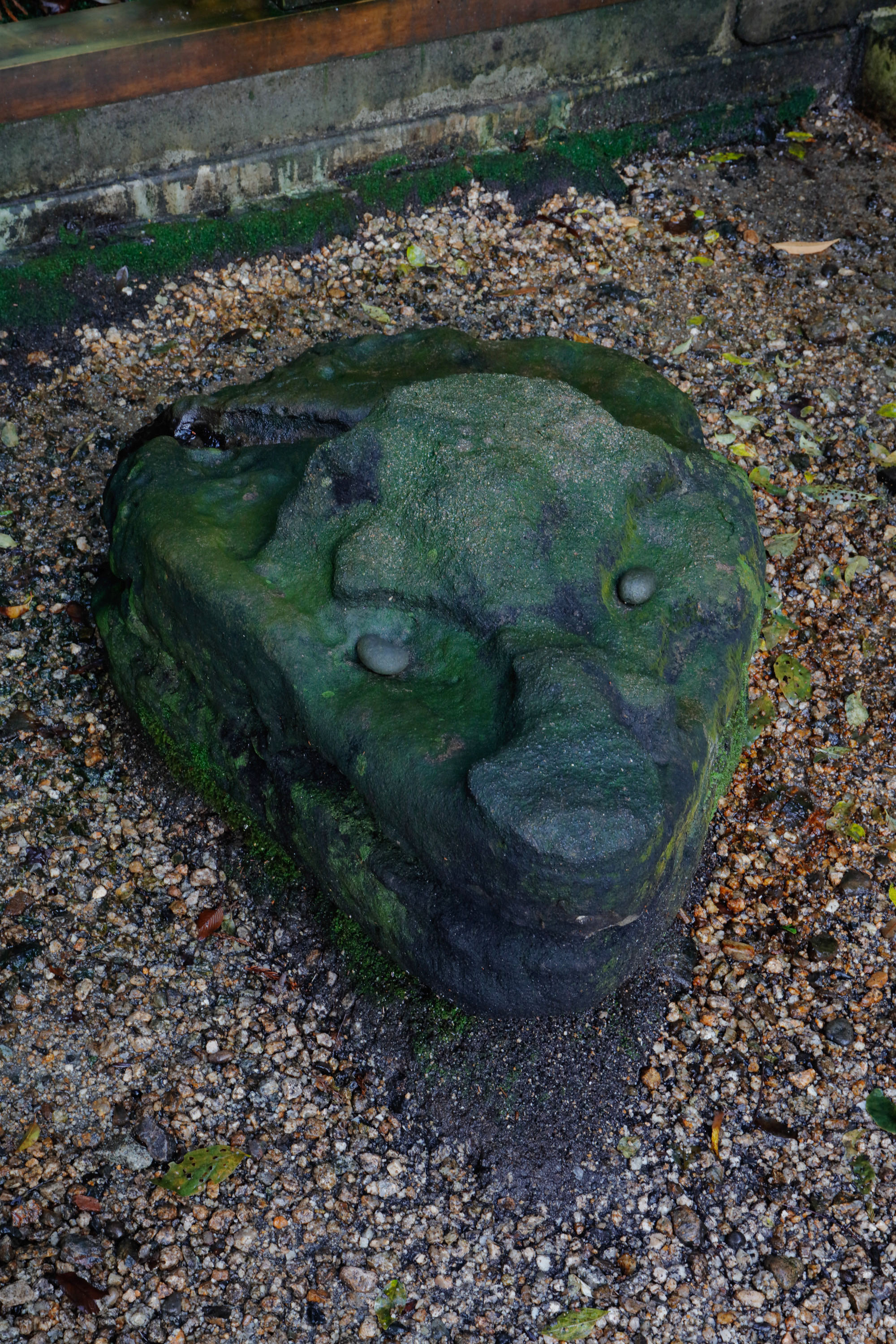

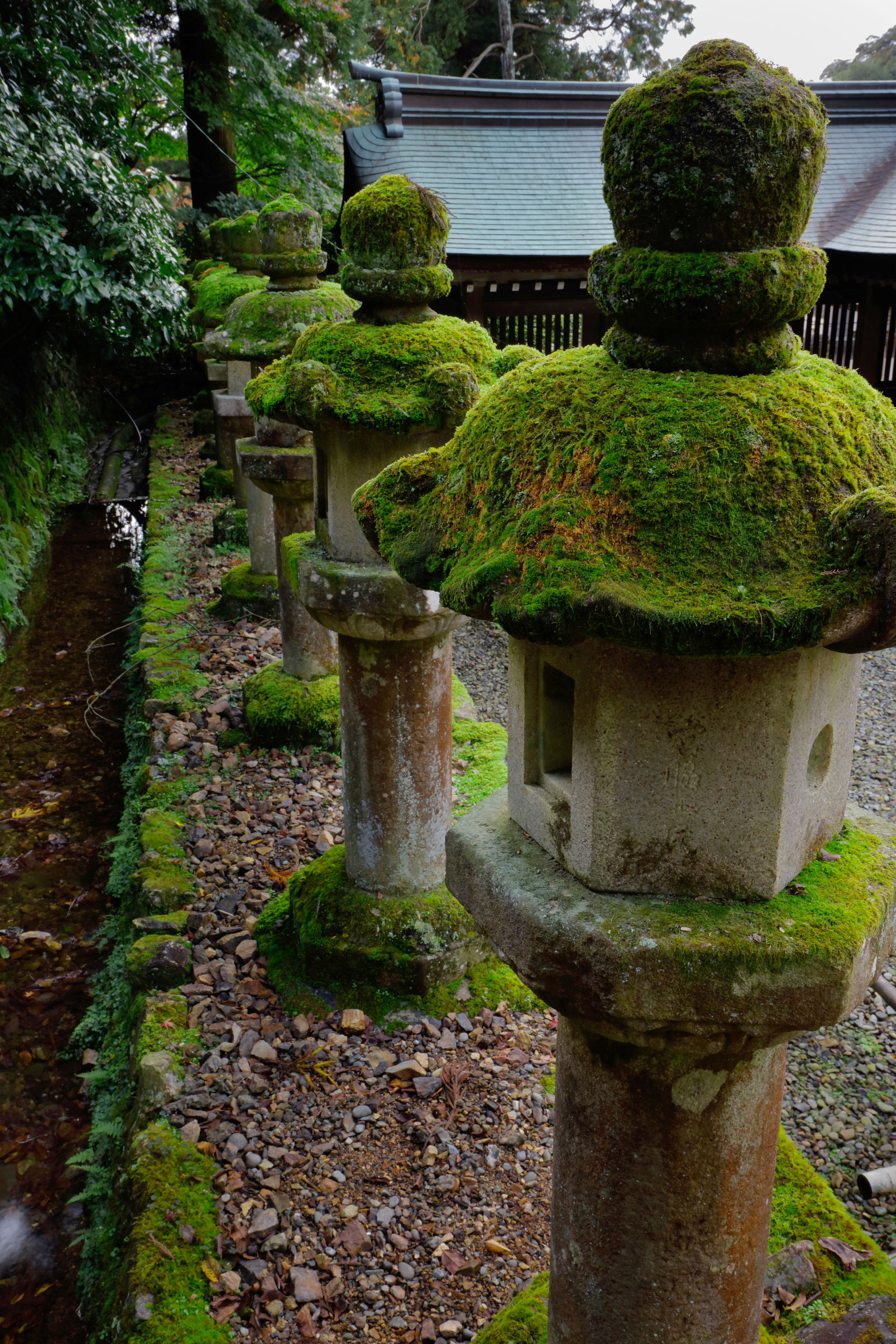

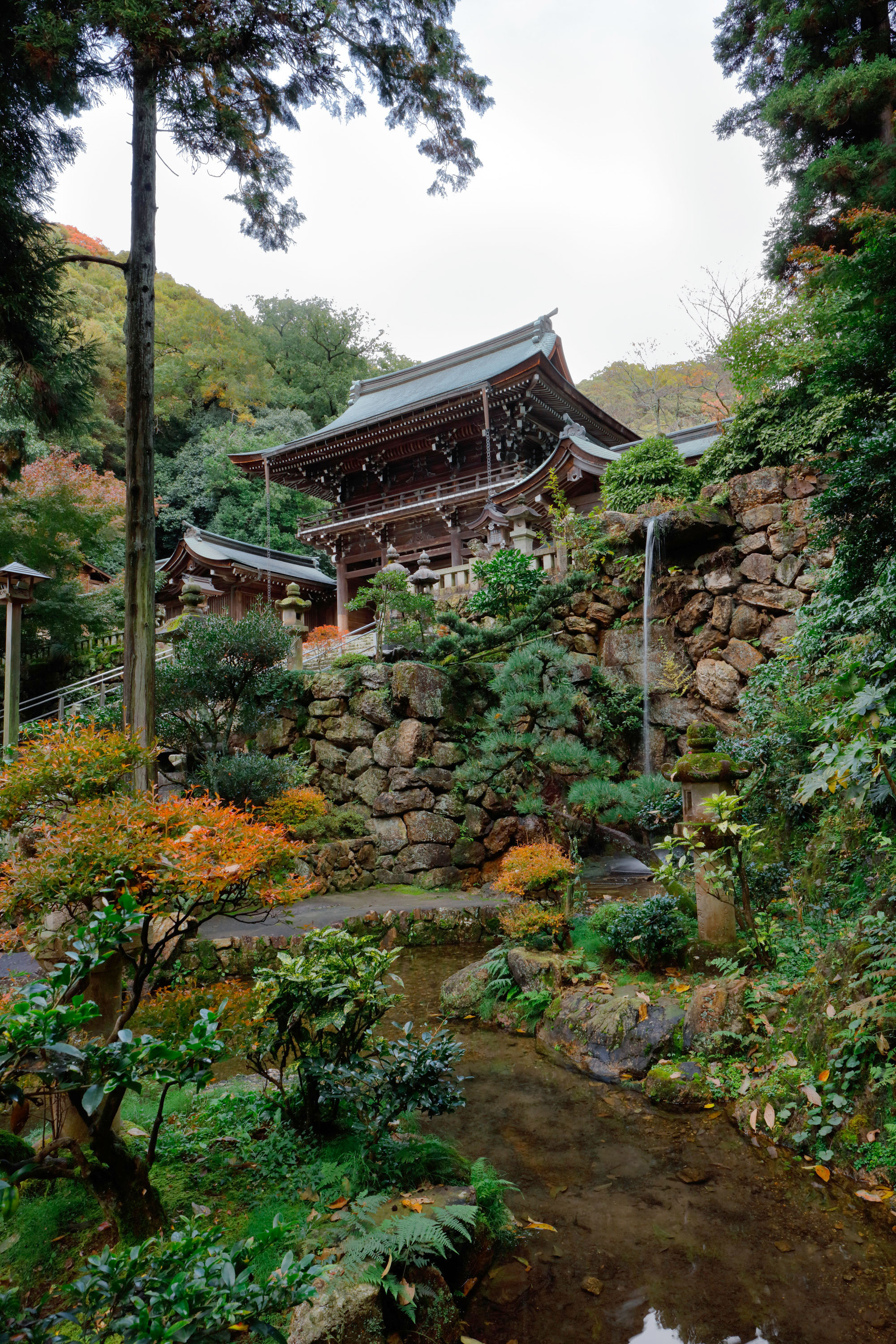

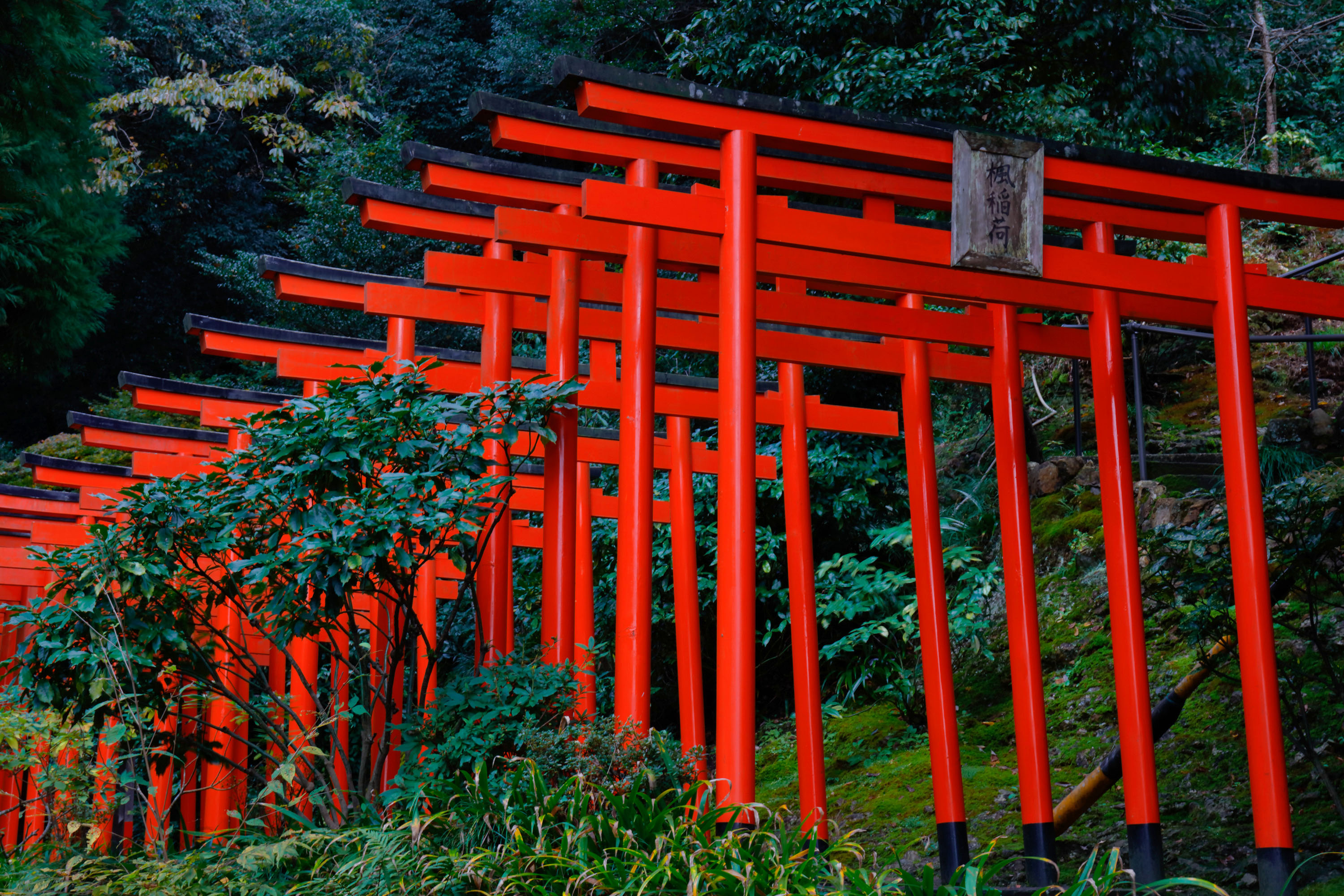

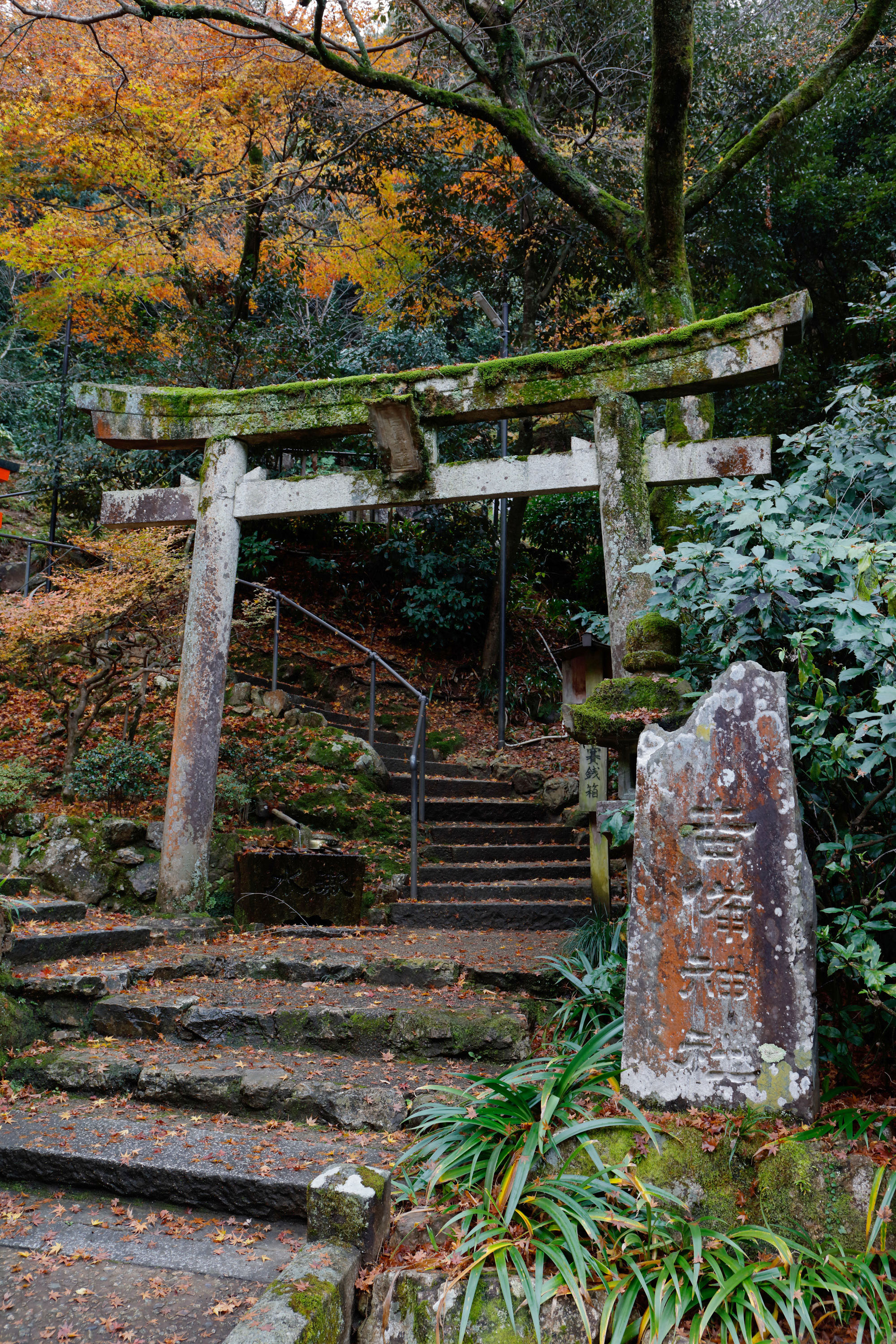

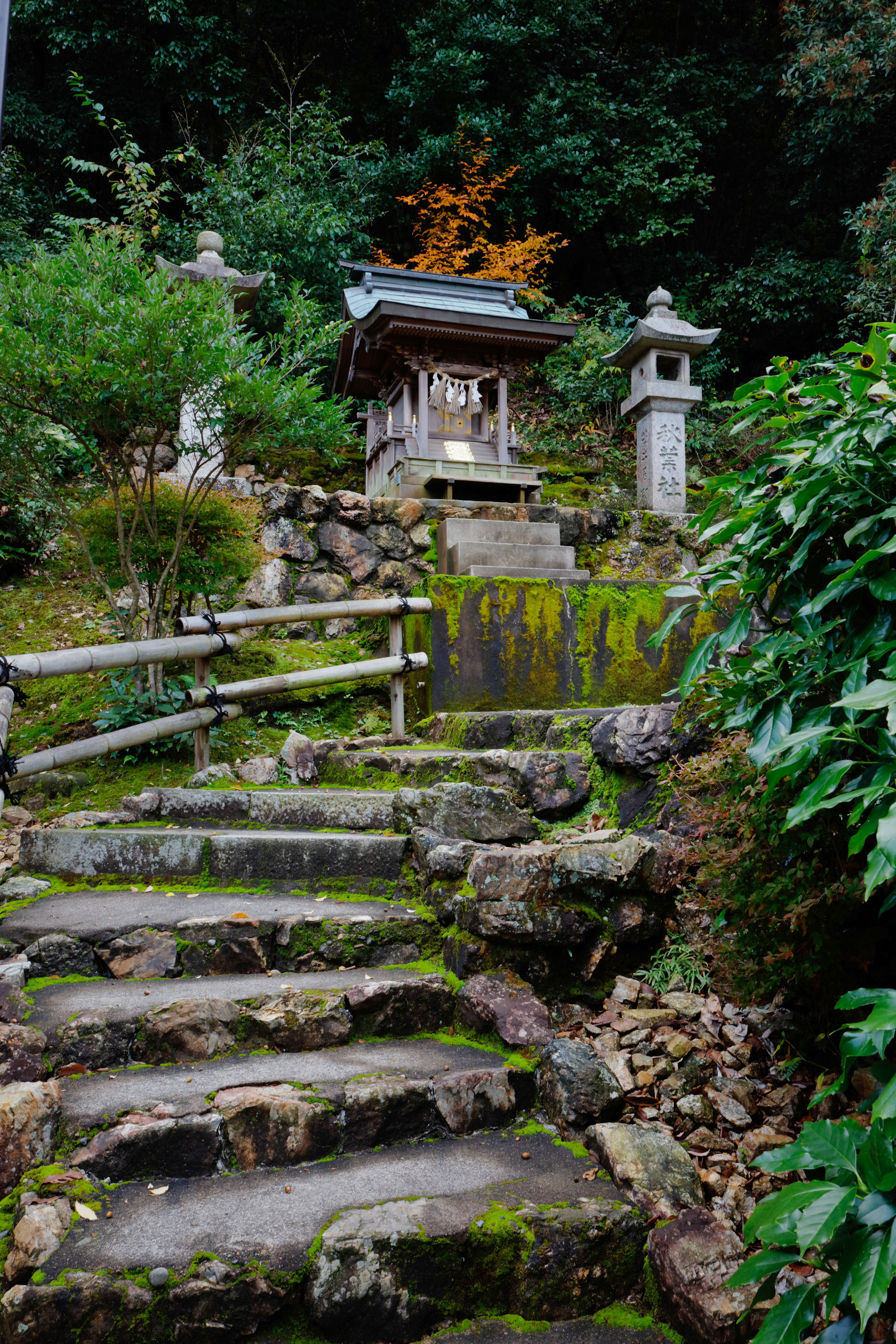

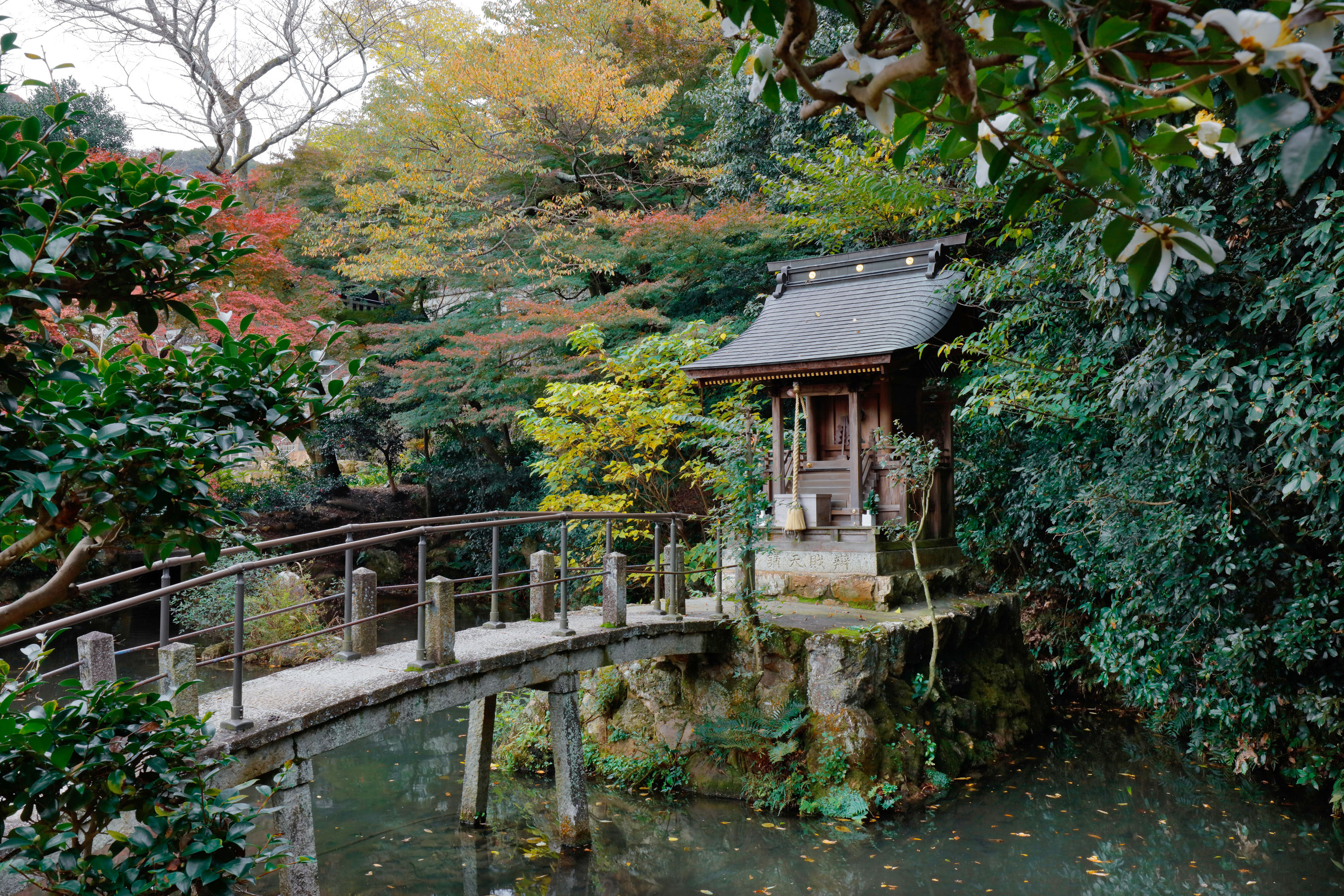
