= Rokugō Masanori =

Japanese feudal lord

Rokugō Masanori 六郷政乗
- Born: 1567
- Died: 25 May 1634 (aged 66–67)
- Occupation: Daimyō of Honjō Domain (1623-1634)

Rokugō Masanori (六郷政乗) was born in 1567 in Dewa Province, Japan, and entered into the service of Onodera Yoshimichi at Yokote Castle, subsequently fighting against Akita Sanesue. For services rendered during the Siege of Odawara in 1590, Toyotomi Hideyoshi rewarded him with a 4500 koku fief in Dewa Province. In 1592, during the Japanese invasions of Korea, Masanori was assigned to Nagoya Castle in Hizen Province. During the Battle of Sekigahara in 1602, he supported the eastern forces of Tokugawa Ieyasu, whereas his nominal overlords, the Onodera clan, supported the Toyotomi.

Under the Tokugawa Shogunate, his revenues were raised to 10,000 koku in 1602, and was made daimyō of Fuchū Domain in Hitachi Province. In 1614, Masanori participated in the Siege of Osaka. When the Mogami clan were dispossessed of their holdings in 1623, he was granted an increase in status to 20,000 koku, and transferred to the newly created Honjō Domain based at Honjō Castle in what is now Yurihonjō, Akita, where his descendants resided until the Meiji restoration. He died in 1634 and his grave is at the clan temple of Eisen-ji in Yurihonjō, Akita.

Preceded by -none-	1st Daimyo of Hitachi-Fuchū; 1603-1623	Succeeded by to Minagawa clan
Preceded by Tsugaru Nobuyoshi	1st Daimyo of Honjō; 1623-1634	Succeeded by Rokugō Masakatsu
