= Kashimori Shrine =

Shinto shrine in Gifu Prefecture, Japan

Kashimori Shrine 橿森神社
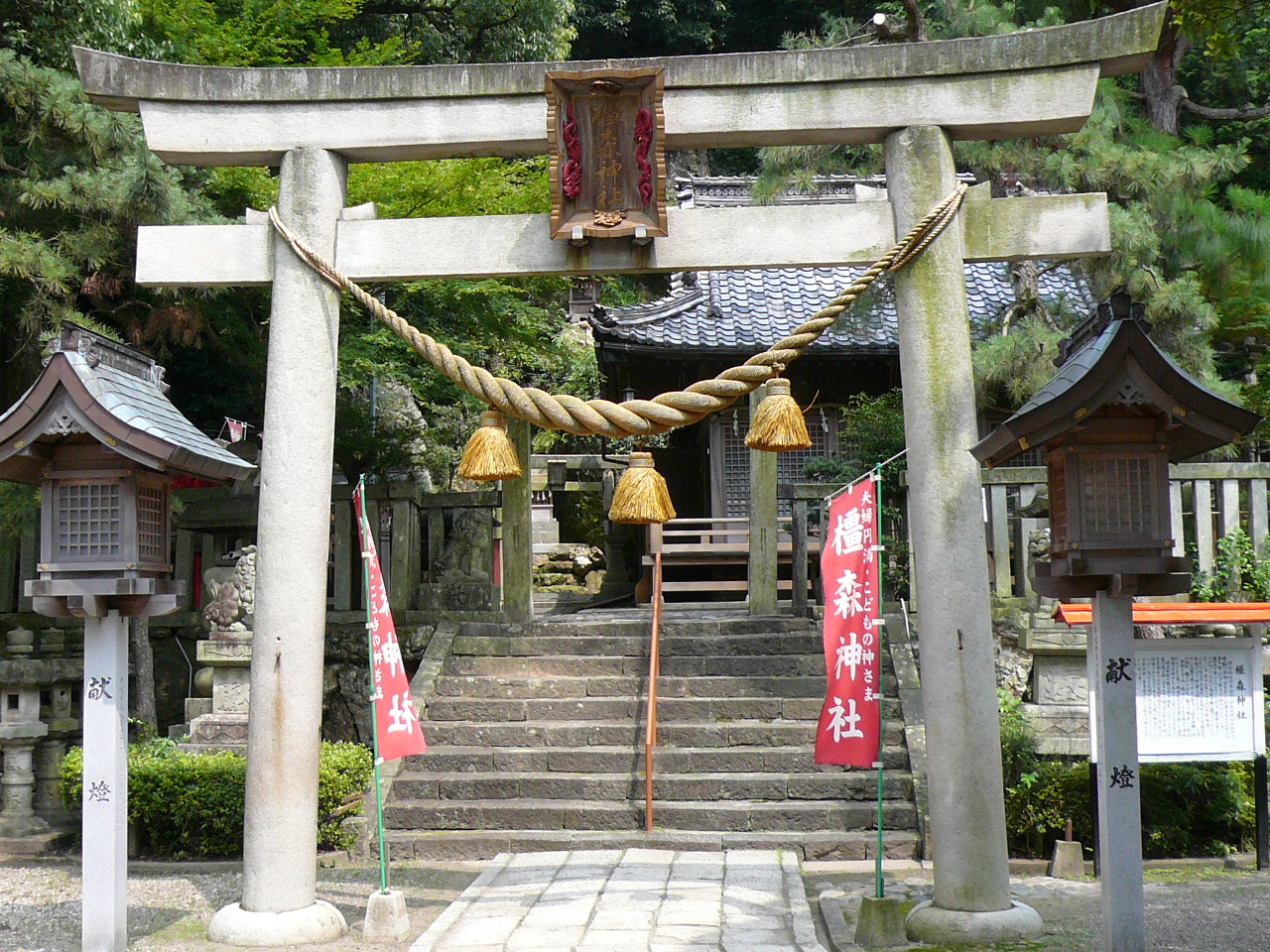
- Entrance to Kashimori Shrine

- Location within Japan

Religion
- Affiliation: Shinto
- Deity: Ichihaya-no-mikoto

Location
- Location: 1-8 Wakamiya-chō; Gifu, Gifu Prefecture, Japan
- Coordinates: 35°25′10″N 136°45′52″E

Kashimori Shrine (橿森神社, Kashimori Jinja) is a Shinto shrine located in the city of Gifu, Gifu Prefecture, Japan. From long ago, it has been considered a good place for married couples and children to go for good luck. One legend associated with Kashimori Shrine is that when Tenma, a mythical horse, landed behind the shrine, it left a hoof print in stone that can still be seen today. Each year, on April 5, the shrine hosts the Gifu Festival, along with Inaba Shrine and Kogane Shrine.

== Enshrined god ==
The Ichihaya-no-mikoto god is worshipped here. His parents are the Inishiki-Irihiko-no-mikoto god (Inaba Shrine) and the Nunoshihime-no-mikoto goddess (Kogane Shrine). Because of the relationship between their three gods, these three shrines have a very close relationship. As this shrine is built for the child of the two other gods, it is the smallest of the three shrines.
