= Kogane Shrine =

Shinto shrine in Gifu Prefecture, Japan

Kogane Shrine 金神社
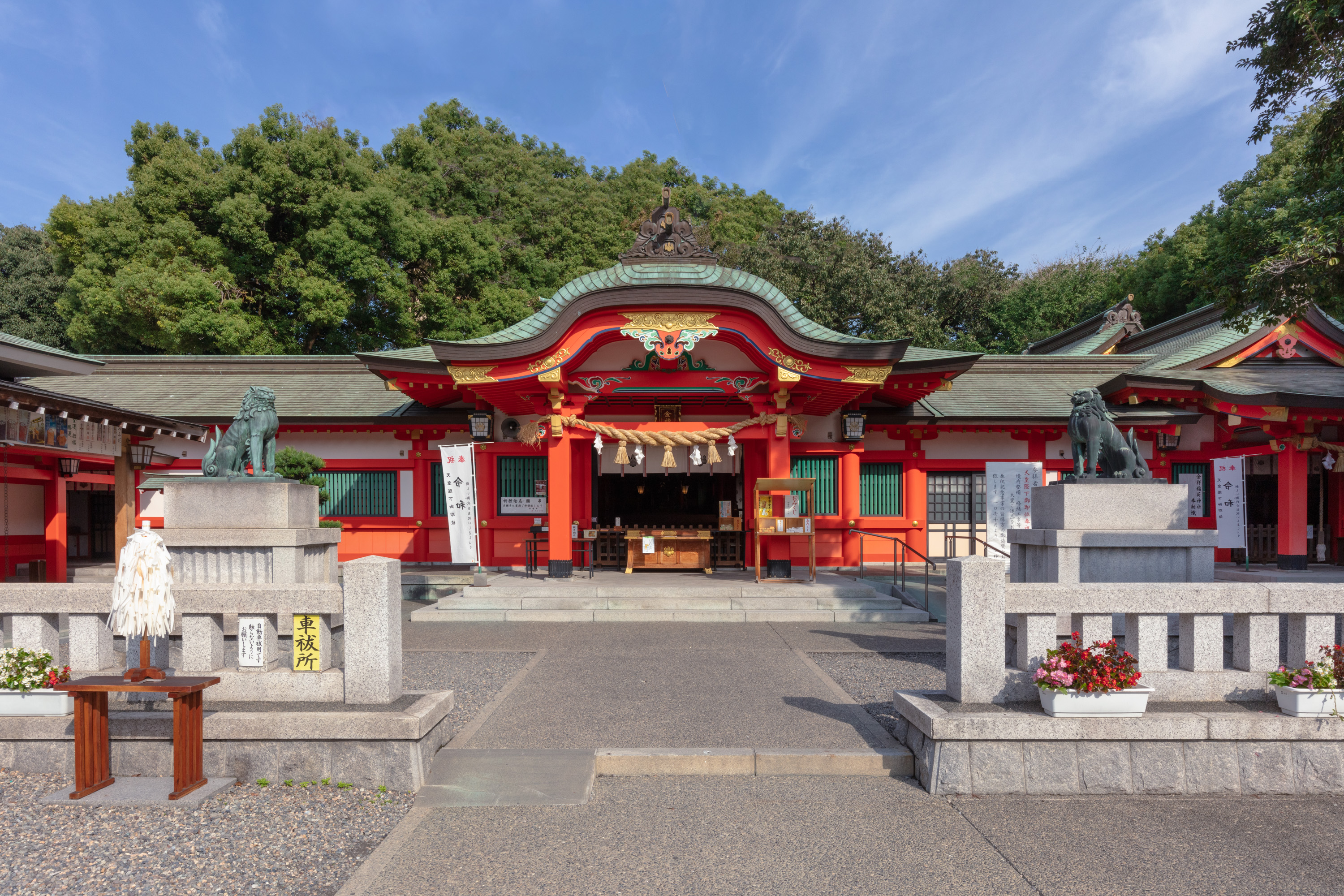

- Location within Japan

Religion
- Affiliation: Shinto
- Deity: Nunoshihime-no-mikoto

Location
- Location: 5-3 Kogane-machi; Gifu, Gifu Prefecture, Japan
- Coordinates: 35.4168°N 136.757°E

Architecture
- Established: 135

Website
- www.geocities.jp/koganejinjya/

Kogane Shrine (金神社, Kogane Jinja) is a Shinto shrine located in the city of Gifu, Gifu Prefecture, Japan. Claimed to have been first built in 135, it has long been considered a place to pray for financial blessings. Because it is located near the city center, approximately 150,000 worshippers visit the shrine over the three-day New Year's period. On April 5, the shrine hosts the Gifu Festival with Inaba Shrine and Kashimori Shrine. The nearby Kogane Hall can be used as a communications place for the citizens of the city.

== History ==
The shrine was destroyed by the Mino–Owari earthquake in 1891, and was rebuilt 14 years later in 1905. However, it was again destroyed in 1945 during air raids during World War II, and was again rebuilt in 1958. The current structure was built in 1988.

== Enshrined god ==
The Nunoshihime-no-mikoto goddess is worshipped here. She is the wife of the Inishiki-Irihiko-no-mikoto god (Inaba Shrine) and the mother of the Ichihaya-no-mikoto god (Kashimori Shrine). Because of the family connection between their three gods, these three shrines have a very close relationship.

== Kogane Park ==
Kogane Park (金公園 Kogane Kōen) is a large park located to the south of Kogane Shrine. The park holds the Gifu City Culture Center, an old streetcar that used to run through the city, a children's play area, and other features.

== Images ==
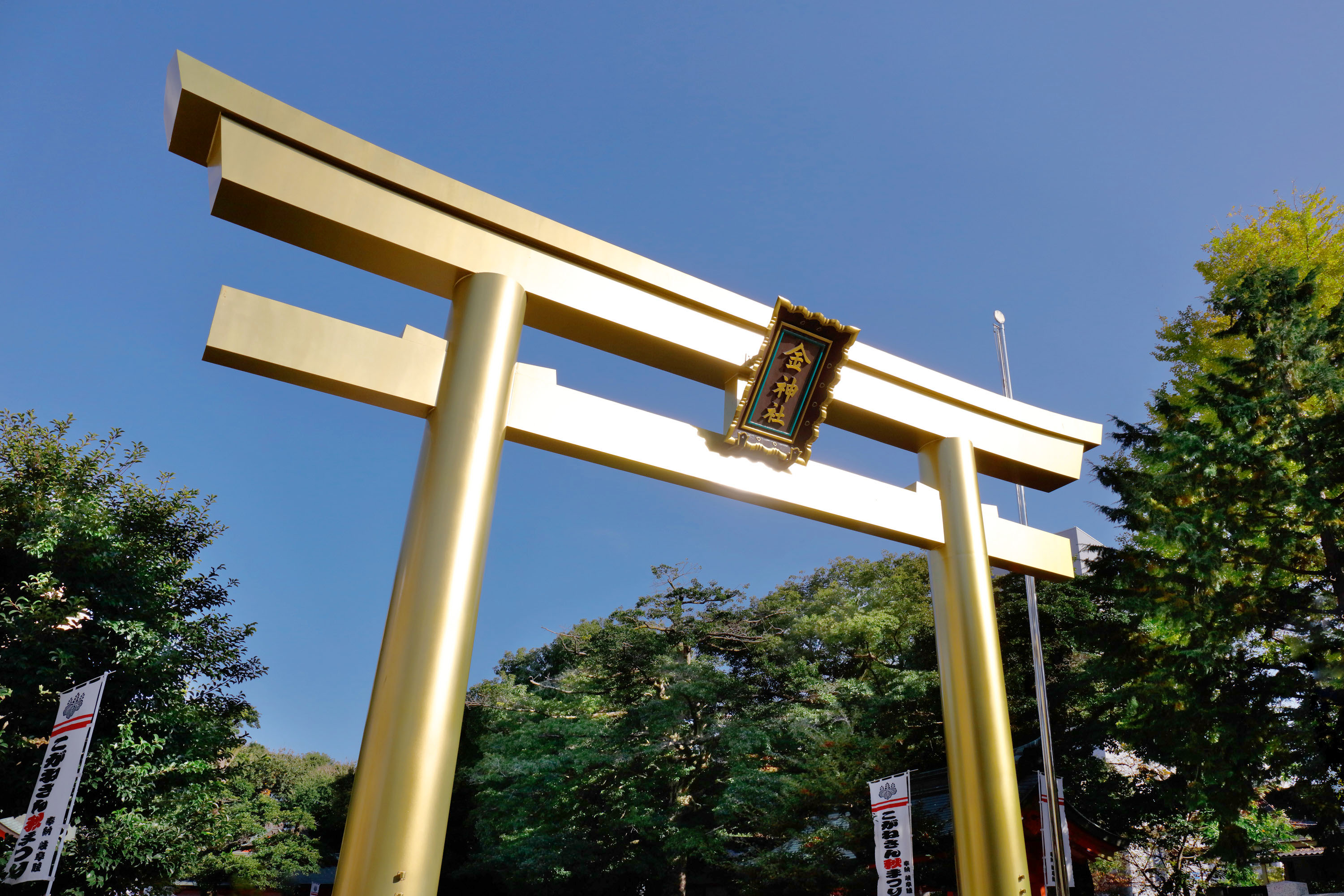

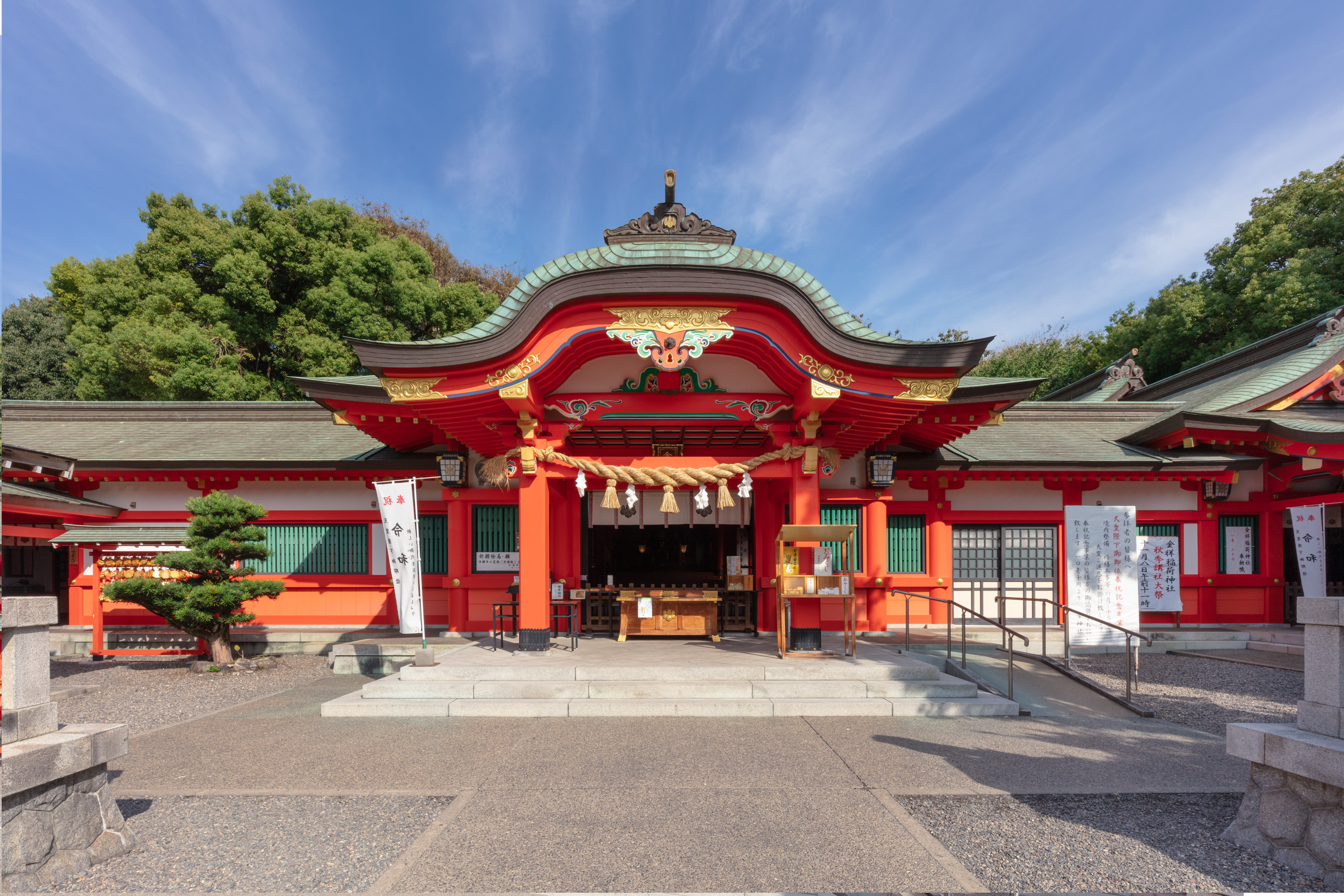

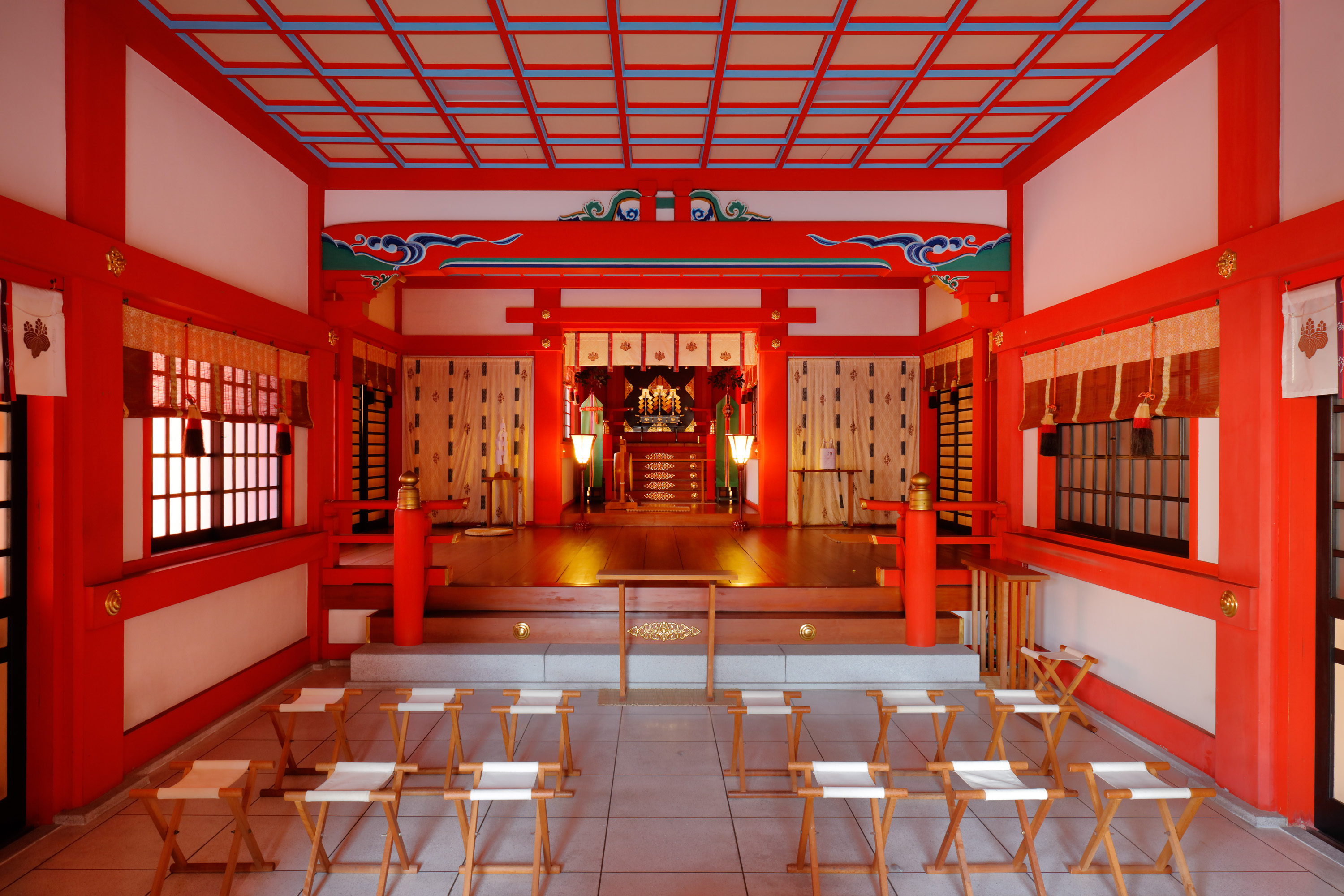

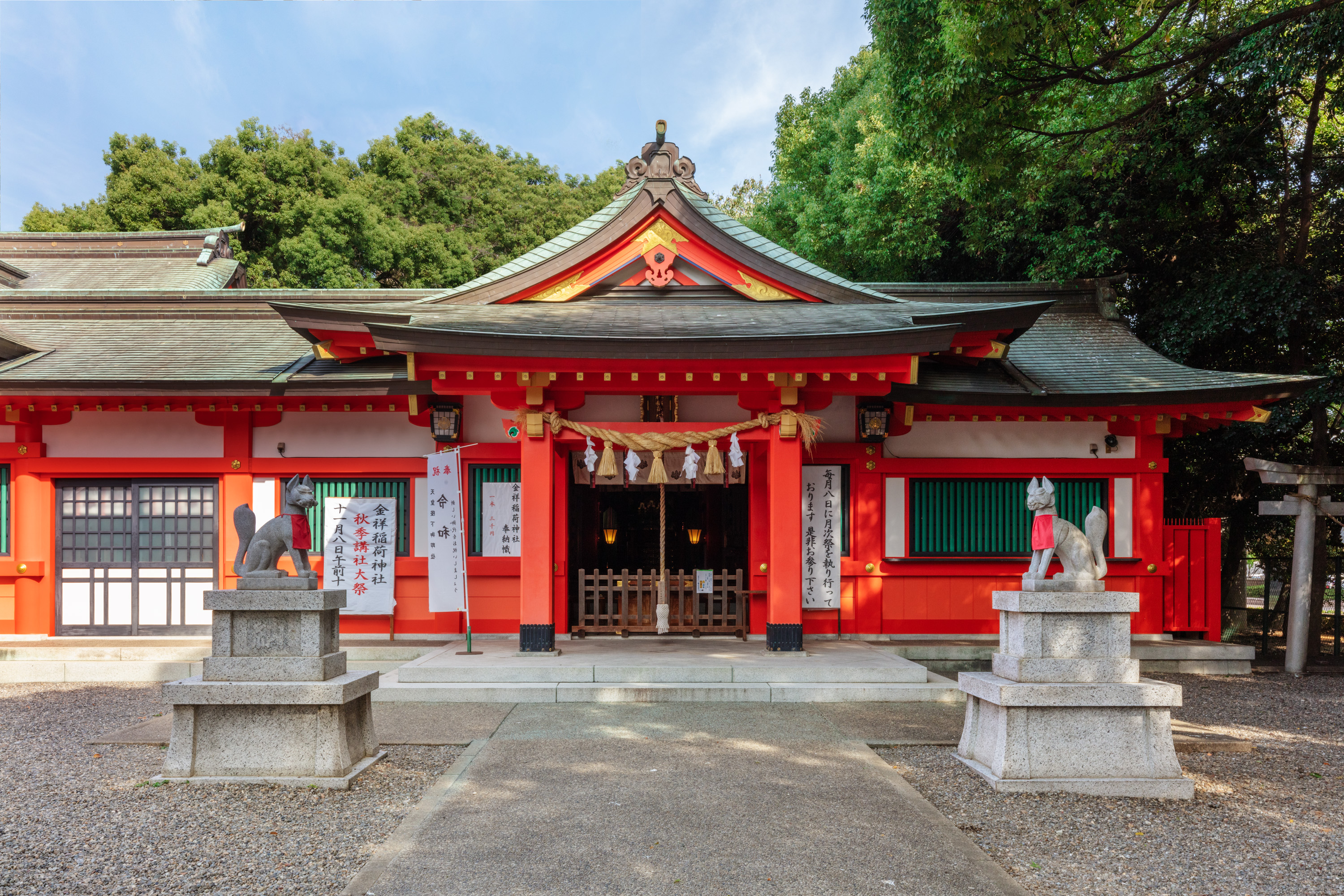

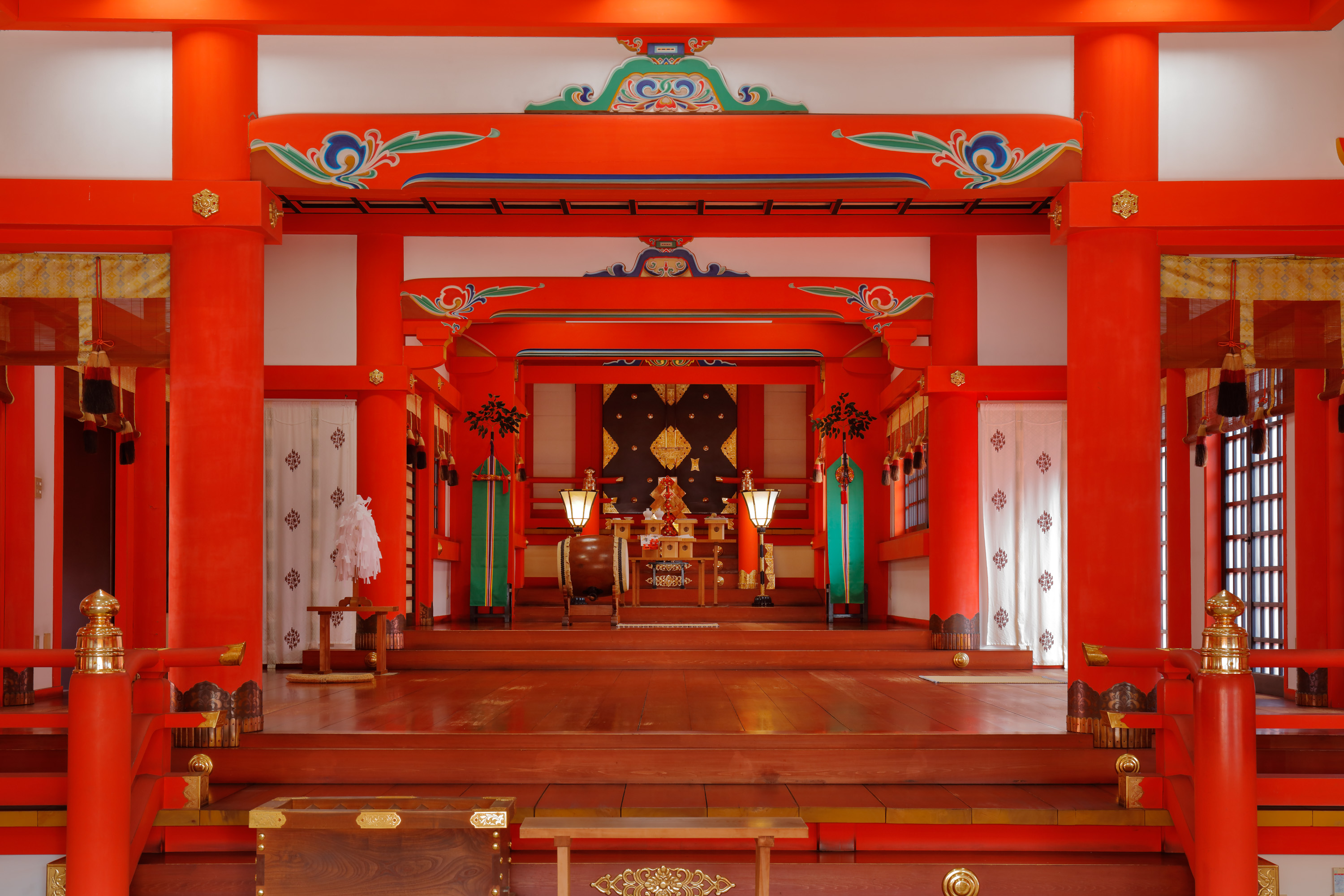

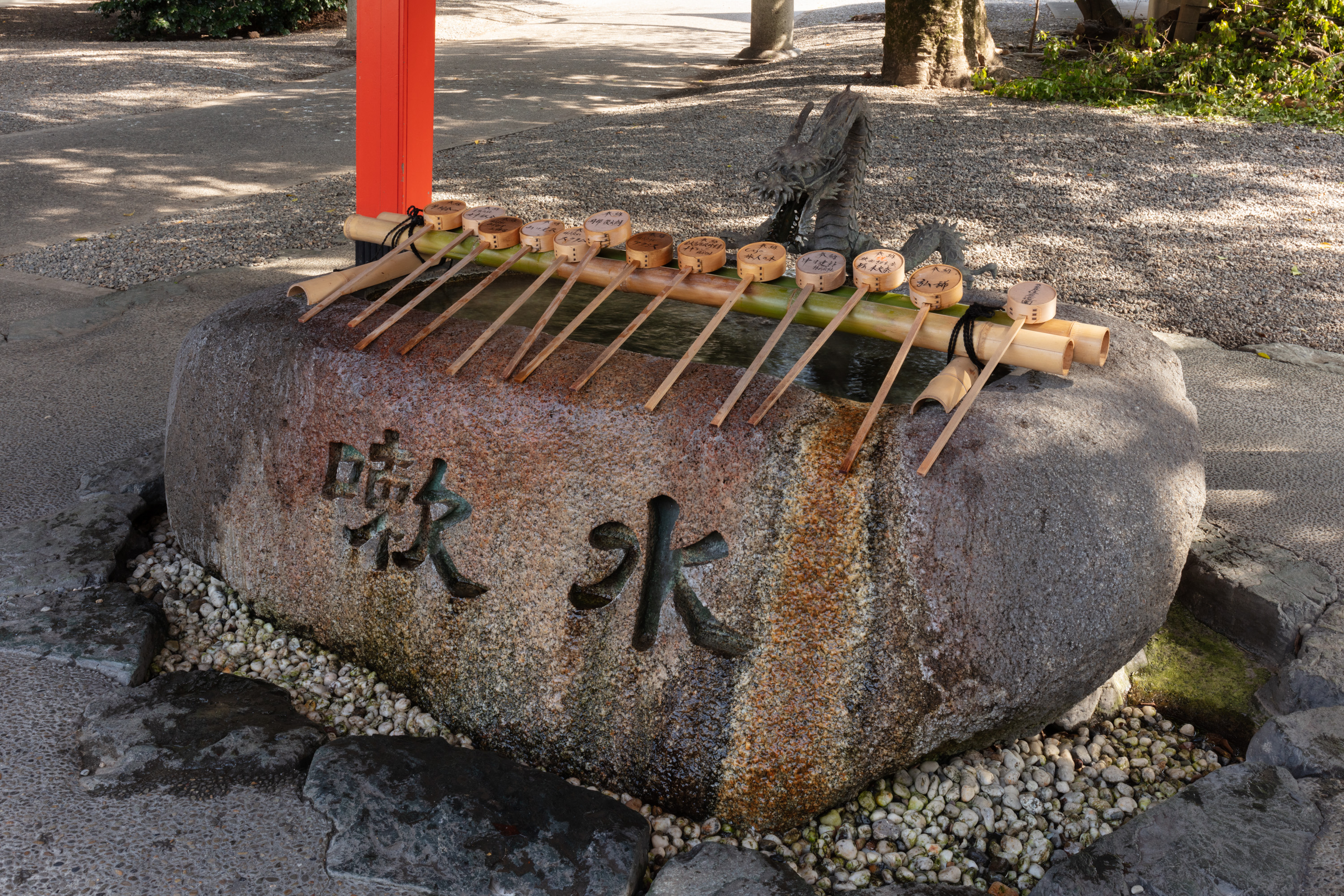

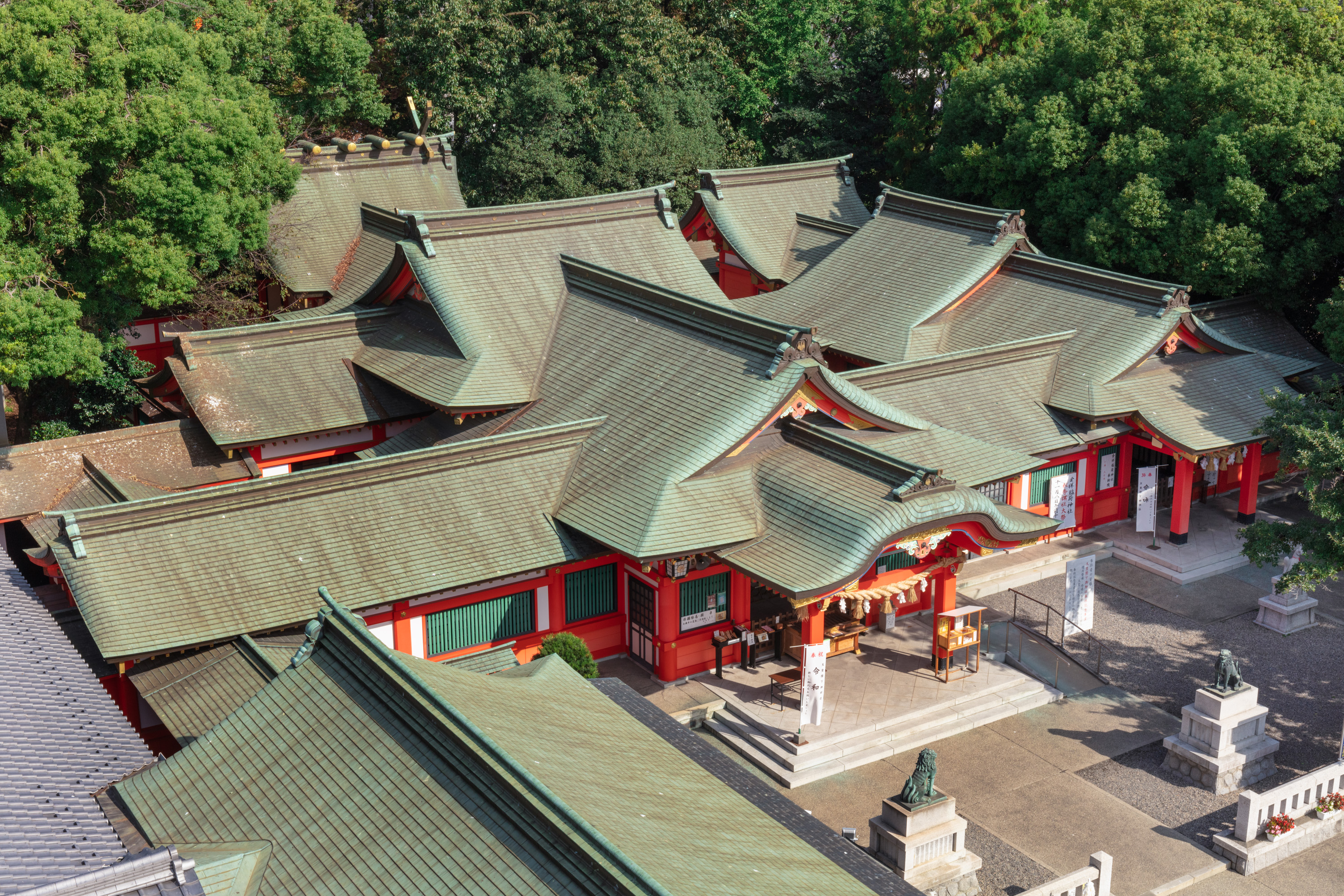
