= Honjō Shrine =

Shinto shrine in Gifu Prefecture, Japan

Honjō Shrine 本荘神社
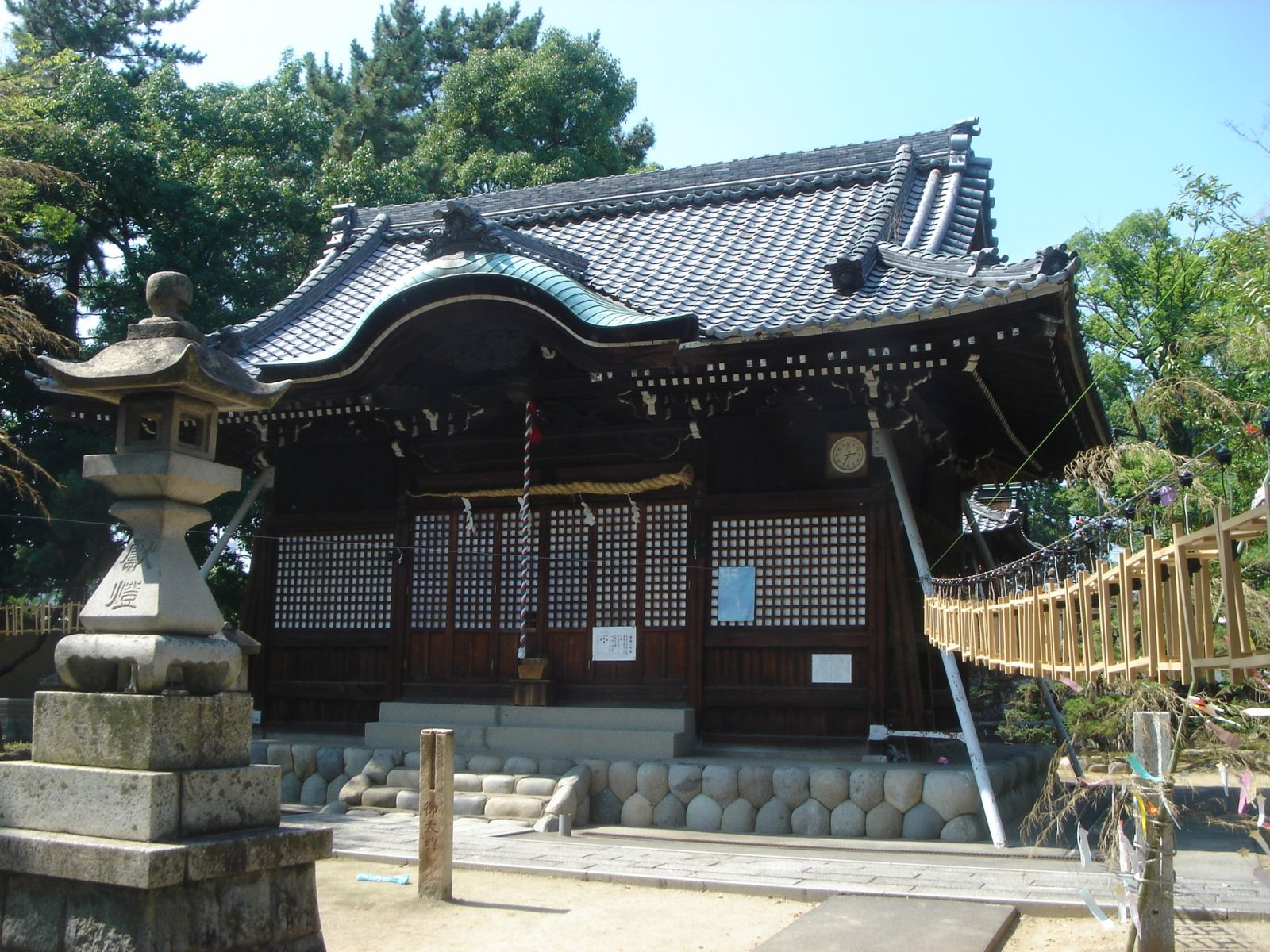
- Honjō Shrine

- Location within Japan

Religion
- Affiliation: Shinto
- Deity: Yamata no Orochi

Location
- Location: 9-24 Shikishima-chō; Gifu, Gifu Prefecture 〒500-8043; Japan
- Coordinates: 35°24′29.58″N 136°43′55.20″E

Architecture
- Established: 995

Website
- homepage3.nifty.com/honjojinja-gifu/

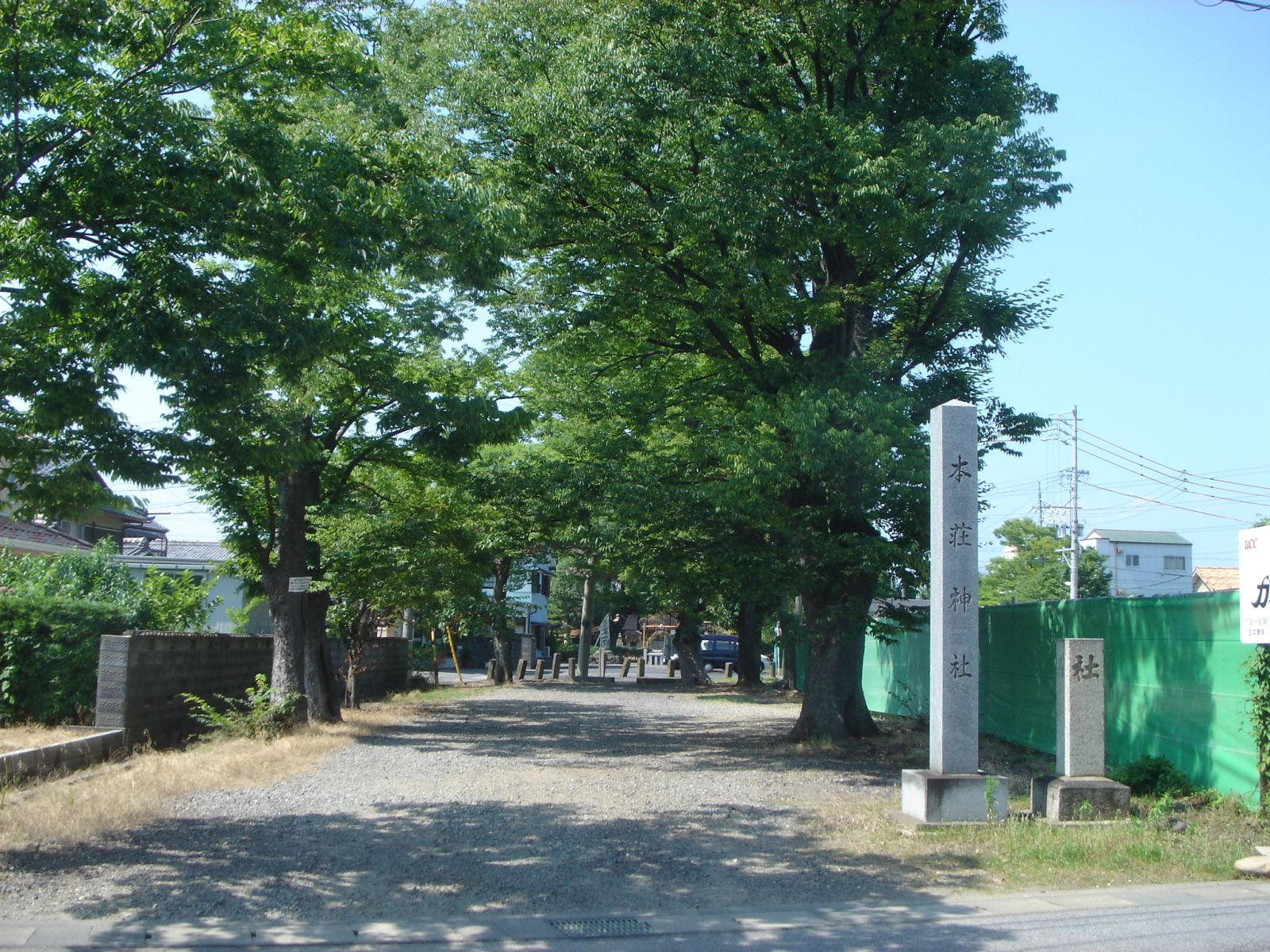
Entrance to Honjō Shrine

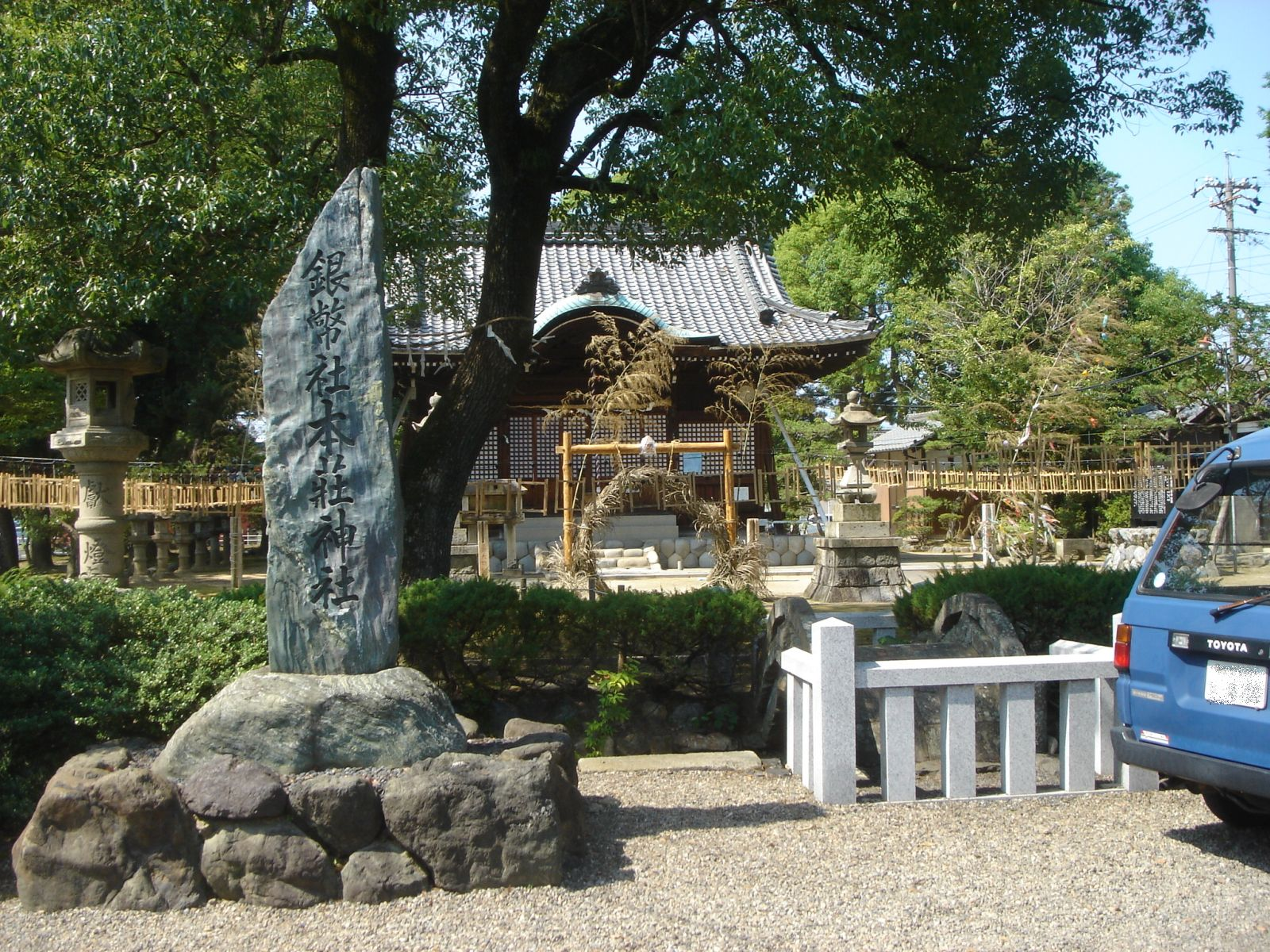
Front of Honjō Shrine

Honjō Shrine (本荘神社, Honjō Jinja) is a Shinto shrine located in Gifu, Gifu Prefecture, Japan. Alternative kanji for the shrine are 本庄神社 (Honjō Jinja). Honjō Shrine was built as a larger shrine, but it was split into three separate shrines, of which the current Honjō Shrine is one. The other two are Yakumo Shrine (八雲神社 Yakumo Jinja) and Rokujō Shrine (六条神社 Rokujō Jinja), both of which are located nearby.

== History ==
The shrine was originally located 3 km (1.9 mi) to the northeast. In 1599, though, Oda Nobukatsu moved the shrine and divided it into the three mentioned above. His reasoning was that he feared a Battle of Gifu Castle between Tokugawa Ieyasu and Ishida Mitsunari. Nobukatsu's fears were confirmed the following year when the Battle of Castle took place as a precursor one month before the larger and more decisive Battle of Sekigahara.

In 1931, the village of Honjō was amalgamated into the city of Gifu and the shrine changed its festival date to April 5, to coincide with Inaba Shrine's Gifu Festival.
