= Matsudaira Yorifumi =

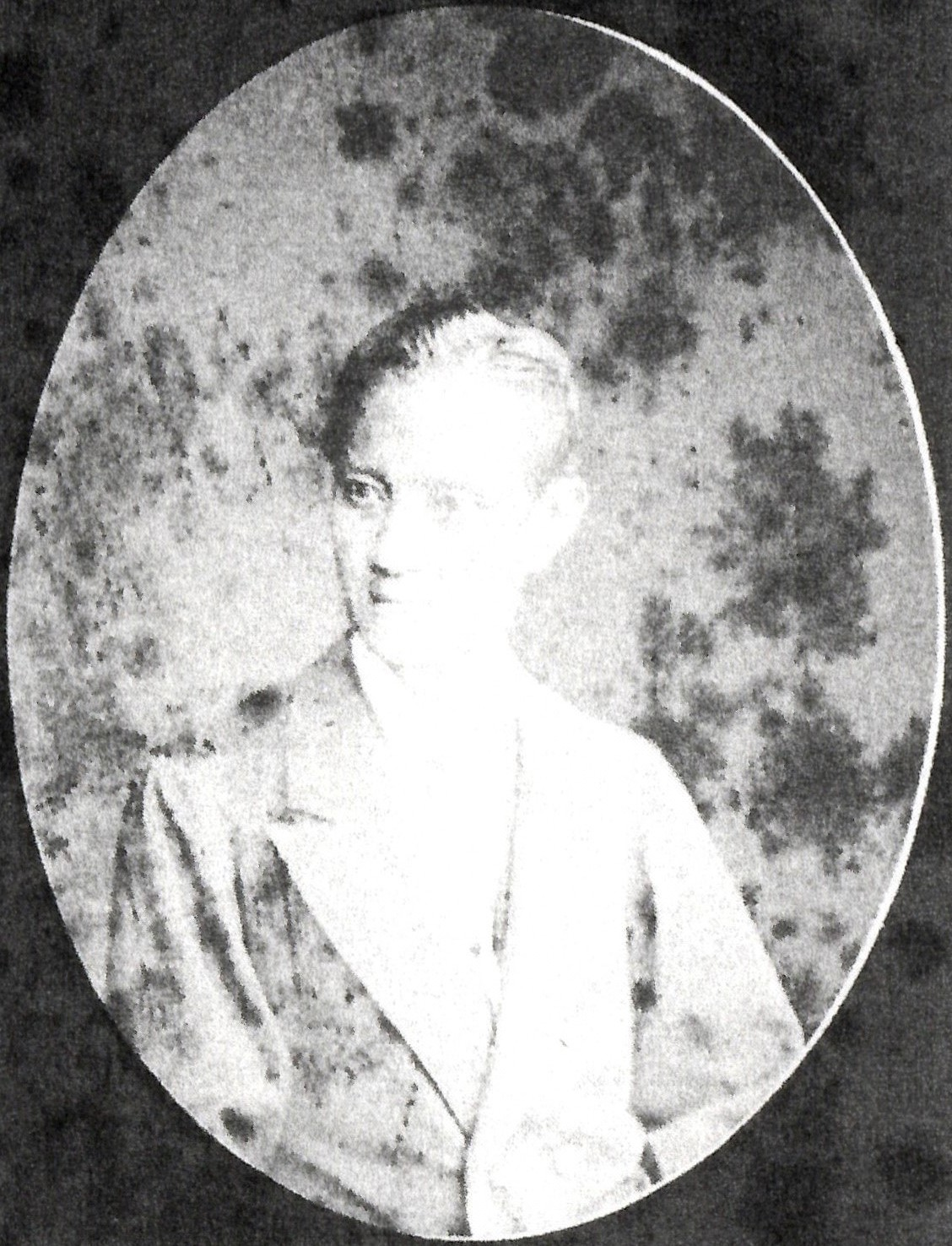
Matsudaira Yorihumi

Viscount Matsudaira Yorifumi (松平 頼策, September 29, 1848 – September 10, 1887); was a Japanese samurai of the late Edo period who served as daimyō of the Fuchū domain in Hitachi Province. Succeeding his father in 1869, he became the last daimyō of Fuchū. It was during his tenure that the domain's name was changed to Ishioka-han (石岡藩). In 1884, he became a viscount (子爵 shishaku).

Preceded by Matsudaira Yoritsugu	Fuchū-Matsudaira clan 1868–1871	Succeeded by none (domain abolished)
