= Honjō Domain =

Feudal domain in Edo period Japan

Honjō Domain 本荘藩
- under Tokugawa shogunate Japan
- 1623–1868
- Capital: Honjō Castle
- Area
  - Coordinates: 39°23′5.49″N 140°2′50.9″E
  - Type: Daimyō
- Historical era: Edo period
  - Established: 1623
  - Disestablished: 1868
- Today part of: part of Akita Prefecture

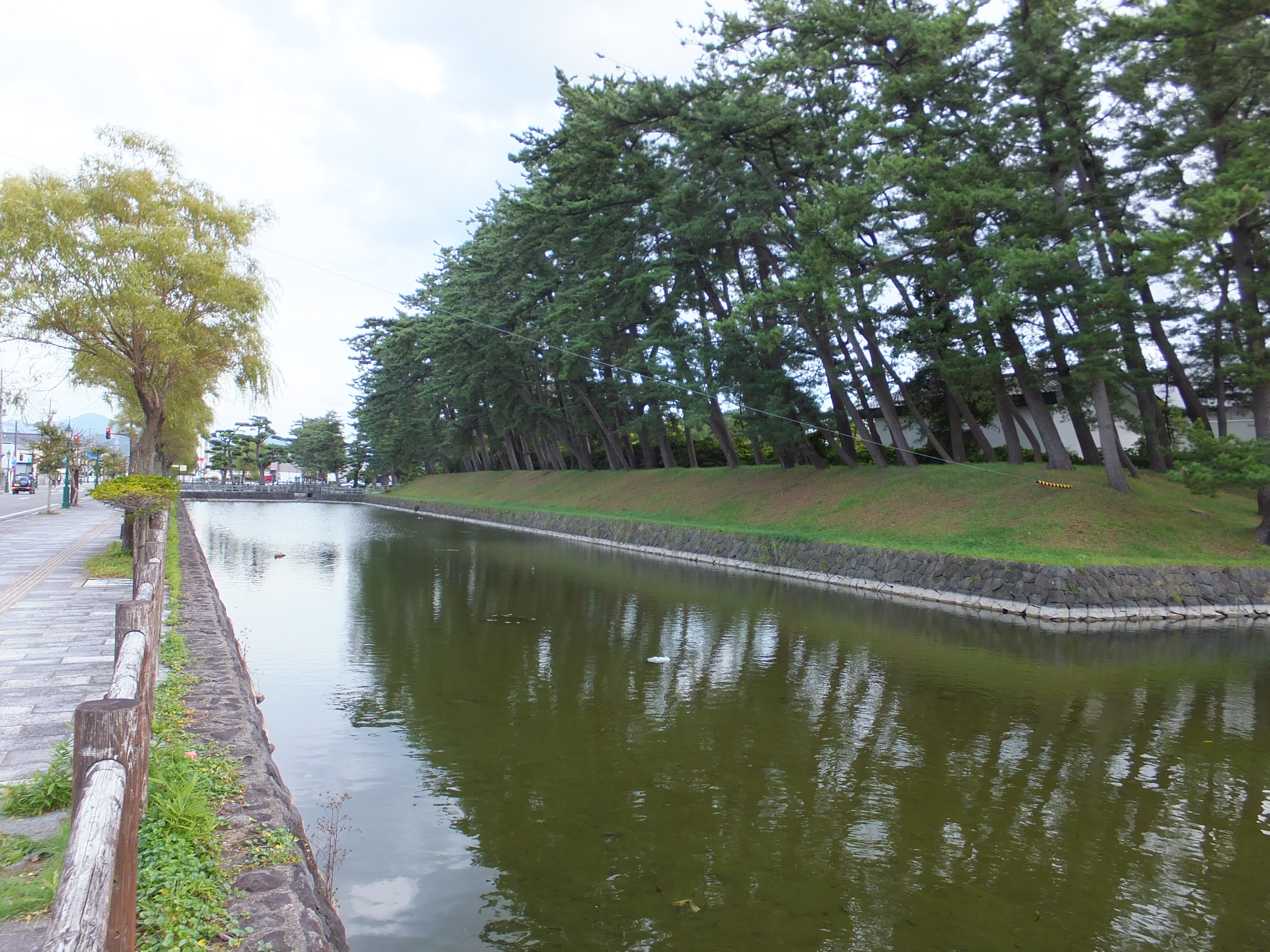
Moats of Honjō Castle, administrative center of Honjō Domain

Honjō Domain (本荘藩, Honjō-han) was a feudal domain in Edo period Japan, located in Dewa Province (modern-day Akita Prefecture), Japan. It was centered on Honjō Castle in what is now the city of Yurihonjō, Akita.

== History ==
Much of Dewa Province was controlled by the powerful Mogami clan during the Sengoku period. The Mogami established a subsidiary holding centered on Honjō Castle in the center of the Yuri region of central Dewa Province in 1610. However, the Mogami were dispossessed by the Tokugawa shogunate in 1622, with the majority of their holdings going to the Satake clan, who were transferred from Hitachi Province to the much smaller holding of Kubota Domain.

Rokugō Masanori, a relatively minor samurai from Senboku Country in Dewa Province served Toyotomi Hideyoshi at the Battle of Odawara in 1590 and was confirmed in his ancestral holdings of 4,500 koku in Dewa Province. He sided with Tokugawa Ieyasu at the Battle of Sekigahara against his nominal overlords, the Onodera clan, and was promoted to the status of a 10,000 koku daimyō, based at Hitachi-Fuchū Domain, with his holdings scattered between Dewa and Hitachi Provinces. When the Mogami clan was dispossessed, the Tokugawa shogunate transferred him in 1623 from Hitachi to the newly created Honjō Domain, and increased his revenues to 20,000 koku, which were all consolidated in the form of 103 villages in Yuki County where his descendants ruled for 11 generations to the Meiji Restoration.

The domain has a population of 23,911 people in 3784 households per the 1674 census. It was 11-days travel time from Edo, where the clan maintained its primary residence (kamiyashiki) at Kita-Inari-cho, in Shitaya. The clan's Edo temple was Tessho-ji in Nishi-Asakusa.

During the Boshin War, the final daimyō of Honjō Domain, Rokugō Masakane sided with the Ōuetsu Reppan Dōmei; however, the domain had scant military resources and was quickly overrun by forces of the pro-Imperial Satchō Alliance, which destroyed Honjō Castle. The new Meiji government reinstated him as domain governor in 1868, but halved his revenues to 10,000 koku. With the abolition of the han system in July 1871, and the absorption of Honjō Domain into Akita Prefecture, Rokugō Masakane relocated to Tokyo. In 1884, he and his descendants were granted the title of viscount (shishaku) in the kazoku peerage.

== List of daimyōs ==
- Rokugō clan (tozama) 1623–1871

#	Name	Tenure	Courtesy title	Court Rank	kokudaka	Notes
1	Rokugō Masanori (六郷政乗)	1623–1634	Hyōgō-gashira (兵庫頭)	Junior 5th Rank, Lower Grade (従五位下)	20,000 koku	son of Rokugō Michiyuki
2	Rokugō Masakatsu (六郷政勝)	1634–1676	Iga-no-kami (伊賀守)	Junior 5th Rank, Lower Grade (従五位下)	20,000 koku	1st son of Masanori
3	Rokugō Masanobu (六郷政信)	1676–1685	Sado-no-kami (佐渡守)	Junior 5th Rank, Lower Grade (従五位下)	20,000 koku	1st son of Masakatsu
4	Rokugō Masaharu (六郷政晴)	1685–1735	Iga-no-kami (伊賀守)	Junior 5th Rank, Lower Grade (従五位下)	20,000 koku	1st son of Masanobu
5	Rokugō Masanaga (六郷政長)	1735–1754	Iga-no-kami (伊賀守)	Junior 5th Rank, Lower Grade (従五位下)	20,000 koku	2nd son of Masaharu
6	Rokugō Masashige (六郷政林)	1754–1783	Hyōgō-gashira (兵庫頭)	Junior 5th Rank, Lower Grade (従五位下)	20,000 koku	1stson of Rokugō Masanaga
7	Rokugō Masachika (六郷政速)	1783–1812	Sado-no-kami (佐渡守)	Junior 5th Rank, Lower Grade (従五位下)	20,000 koku	3rd son of Masashige
8	Rokugō Masazumi (六郷政純)	1812–1822	Awa-no-kami (阿波守)	Junior 5th Rank, Lower Grade (従五位下)	20,000 koku	2nd son of Masachika
9	Rokugō Masatsune (六郷政恒)	1822–1848	Hyōgō-gashira (兵庫頭)	Junior 5th Rank, Lower Grade (従五位下)	20,000 koku	grandson of Masachiki, via 1st son Masayoshi
10	Rokugō Masatada (六郷政殷)	1848–1861	Sado-no-kami (佐渡守)	Junior 5th Rank, Lower Grade (従五位下)	20,000 koku	2nd son of Rokugō Masatsune
11	Rokugō Masakane (六郷政鑑)	1861–1871	Hyōgō-gashira (兵庫頭)	3rd (従三位), Viscount	20,000 → 10,000 koku	1st son of Masatada
