= Rokugō clan =

Ancient Japanese samurai clan

Rokugō 六郷
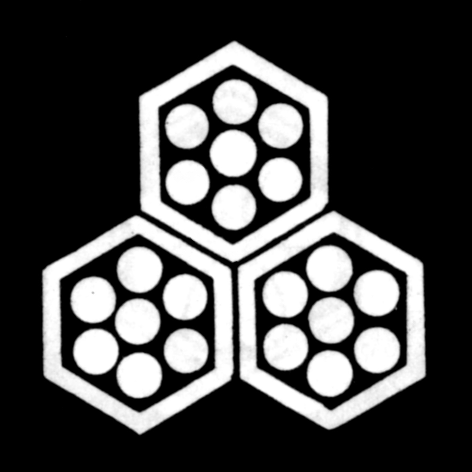
- Rokugō family crest
- Home province: Dewa Province
- Parent house: Southern Fujiwara clan via the Nikaidō clan
- Titles: daimyō (Edo period); viscount (post-Edo period)
- Founder: Rokugō Michiyuki
- Final ruler: Rokugō Masakane
- Ruled until: 1873 (Abolition of the han system)

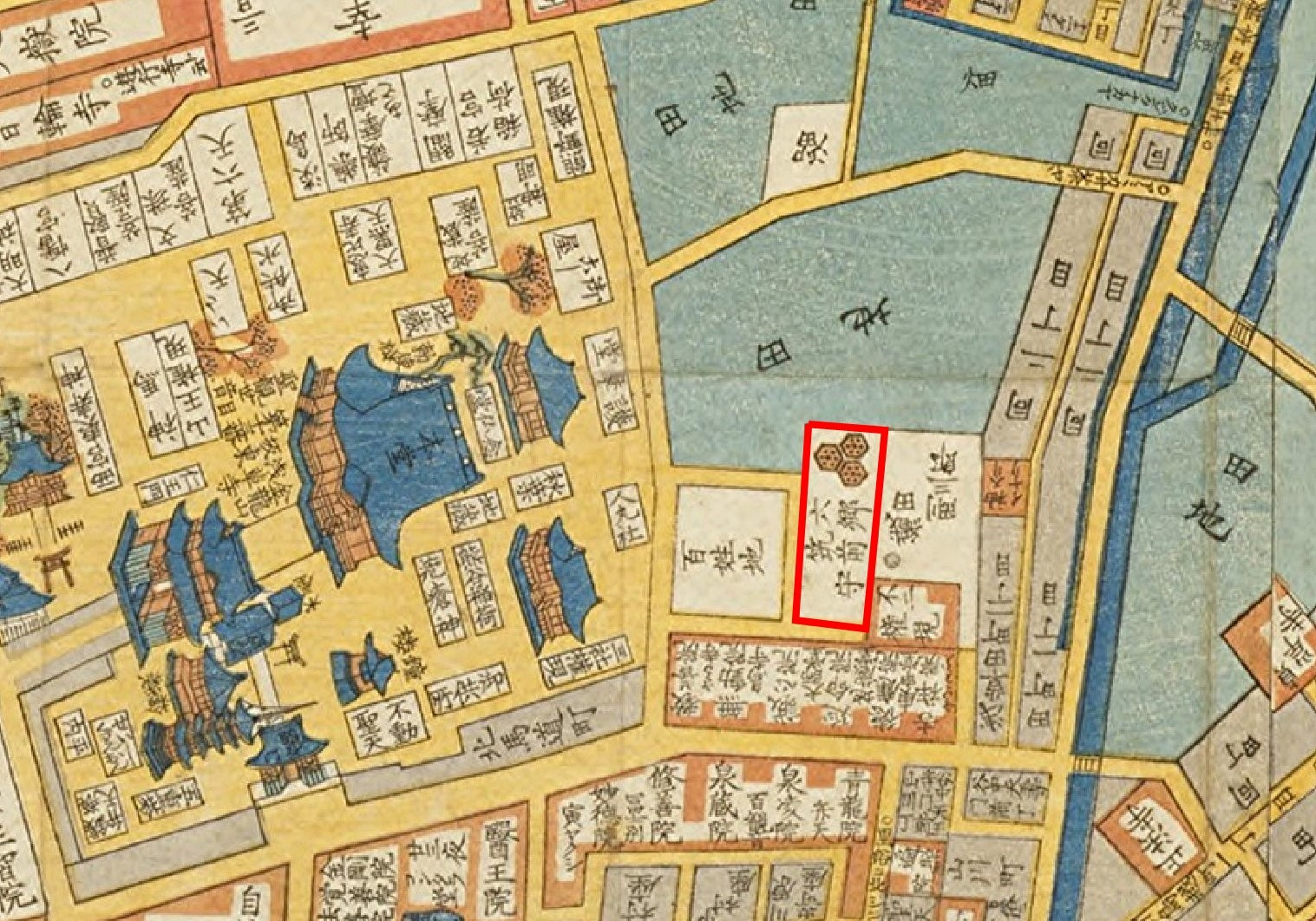
Rokugō kamiyashiki in Edo near Sensō-ji) in 1850

The Rokugō clan (六郷氏, Rokugō shi) was a Japanese samurai clan that claimed descent from the Fujiwara clan and was based at Senboku County Dewa Province in the late Sengoku period. It should not be confused with a samurai clan of the same name which appears in early Muromachi period records from Musashi Province.

Rokugō Masanori (1567–1634) was rewarded by Tokugawa Ieyasu for siding with the eastern armies in the Battle of Sekigahara against his nominal overlords, the Onodera clan, by an increase in his holdings from 4,500 koku to 10,000 koku and the status of daimyō of Hitachi-Fuchū Domain. He served the Tokugawa shogunate during the 1614 Siege of Osaka, and after the destruction of the Mogami clan, was transferred to Honjō Domain with an increase in revenues to 20,000 koku which were all consolidated in the form of 103 villages in Yuki County where his descendants ruled for 11 generations to the Meiji Restoration.

During the Boshin War of 1868–69, the Rokugō were signatories to the pact that formed the Ōuetsu Reppan Dōmei, but were outgunned by the imperial forces subduing the alliance, and their home base, Honjō Castle was destroyed during that conflict. As with all other daimyō families, the Rokugō clan was relieved of its title in 1871 by the new Meiji government. The final daimyō of Honjō Domain was subsequently granted the kazoku peerage title of "shishaku" (viscount).
