= Hitachi-Fuchū Domain =

Ishioka Domain (1869–1871) 石岡藩 Hitachi-Fuchū Domain (1602–1869) 常陸府中藩
- Domain of Japan
- 1602–1871
- Capital: Fuchū jin'ya
  - Type: Daimyō
- Historical era: Edo period
  - Established: 1602
  - Disestablished: 1871
Preceded by	Succeeded by
Hitachi Province	Ishioka Prefecture
- Today part of: Ibaraki Prefecture

Hitachi-Fuchū Domain (常陸府中藩, Hitachi-Fuchū han) was a feudal domain under the Tokugawa shogunate of Edo period Japan, located in Hitachi Province (modern-day Ibaraki Prefecture), Japan. It was centered on Fuchū Jin'ya in what is now the city of Ishioka, Ibaraki. It was also known as Ishioka Domain (石岡藩, Ishioka han) or Naganuma Domain (長沼藩, Naganuma han)

== History ==
The domain was created in 1602, when Rokugō Masanori, the head of the Rokugō clan, a prominent family of Dewa Province, was awarded a 10,000 koku holding in Hitachi-Fuchū for serviced rendered to Tokugawa Ieyasu during the Battle of Sekigahara. The clan was transferred to Honjō Domain in Dewa in 1623. The domain then passed into the hands of the Minagawa clan until 1645, when that clan was reduced to hatamoto status for lack of a direct heir.

In 1700, the domain was revived for the 5th son of Tokugawa Yorifusa of Mito Domain, who assumed the Matsudaira surname. The Matsudaira continued to rule the domain until the Meiji restoration. The domain was renamed Ishioka-han in 1869. It was abolished in the Haihan Chiken order of 1871.

The domain had a population of 16,913 people in 2774 households, of who, 901 were classed as samurai in 198 household and 182 were classed as ashigaru in 109 households per a census in 1869.

== Holdings at the end of the Edo period ==
As with most domains in the han system, Hitachi-Fuchū Domain consisted of several discontinuous territories calculated to provide the assigned kokudaka, based on periodic cadastral surveys and projected agricultural yields.

- Hitachi Province
  - 3 villages in Ibaraki District
  - 9 villages in Namegata District
  - 6 villages in Niihari District

== List of daimyō ==
#	Name	Tenure	Courtesy title	Court Rank	kokudaka
Rokugō clan (tozama) 1602–1623
1	Rokugō Masanori (六郷政乗)	1602–1623	Hyōgō-gashira (兵庫頭)	Lower 5th (従五位下)	10,000 koku
Minagawa clan (fudai) 1623–1645
1	Minagawa Hiroteru (皆川 広照)	1623–1625	Yamashiro-no-kami (山城守)	Lower 4th (従四位下)	10,000 koku
2	Minagawa Takatsune (皆川 隆庸)	1625–1645	Yamashiro-no-kami (山城守)	Lower 5th (従五位下)	10,000 ->15,000 ->18,000 koku
3	Minagawa Narisato (皆川 成郷)	1645–1645	-none-	-none-	18,000 koku
	tenryō	1645–1700			
Matsudaira clan (Shinpan) 1700–1871
1	Matsudaira Yoritaka (松平 頼隆)	1700–1705	Harima-no-kami (播磨守); Jiju (侍従)	Lower 4th (従四位下)	20,000 koku
2	Matsudaira Yoriyuki (松平 頼如)	1705–1707	Noto-no-kami (能登守); Jiju (侍従)	Lower 4th (従四位下)	20,000 koku
3	Matsudaira Yoriaki (松平 頼明)	1707–1733	Harima-no-kami (播磨守); Jiju (侍従)	Lower 4th (従四位下)	20,000 koku
4	Matsudaira Yorinaga (松平 頼永)	1733–1735	Harima-no-kami (播磨守); Jiju (侍従)	Lower 4th (従四位下)	20,000 koku
5	Matsudaira Yoritomi (松平 頼幸)	1735–1742	Harima-no-kami (播磨守); Jiju (侍従)	Lower 4th (従四位下)	20,000 koku
6	Matsudaira Yorisumi (松平 頼済)	1742–1784	Harima-no-kami (播磨守); Jiju (侍従)	Lower 4th (従四位下)	20,000 koku
7	Matsudaira Yorisaki (松平 頼前)	1784–1795	Ukon-daibu (右京大夫)	Lower 4th (従四位下)	20,000 koku
8	Matsudaira Yorihisa (松平 頼説)	1795–1833	Harima-no-kami (播磨守); Jiju (侍従)	Lower 4th (従四位下)	20,000 koku
9	Matsudaira Yoritsugu (松平 頼縄)	1833–1868	Ukon-daibu (右京大夫)	Lower 4th (従四位下)	20,000 koku
10	Matsudaira Yorifumi (松平 頼策)	1868–1871	Harima-no-kami (播磨守)	Lower 4th (従四位下)	20,000 koku
