= Honjō Castle =

Castle in Yurihonjō, Akita Prefecture, Japan

Coordinates: 39°23′5.49″N 140°2′50.9″E

- 本荘城
- Yurihonjō, Akita Prefecture, Japan
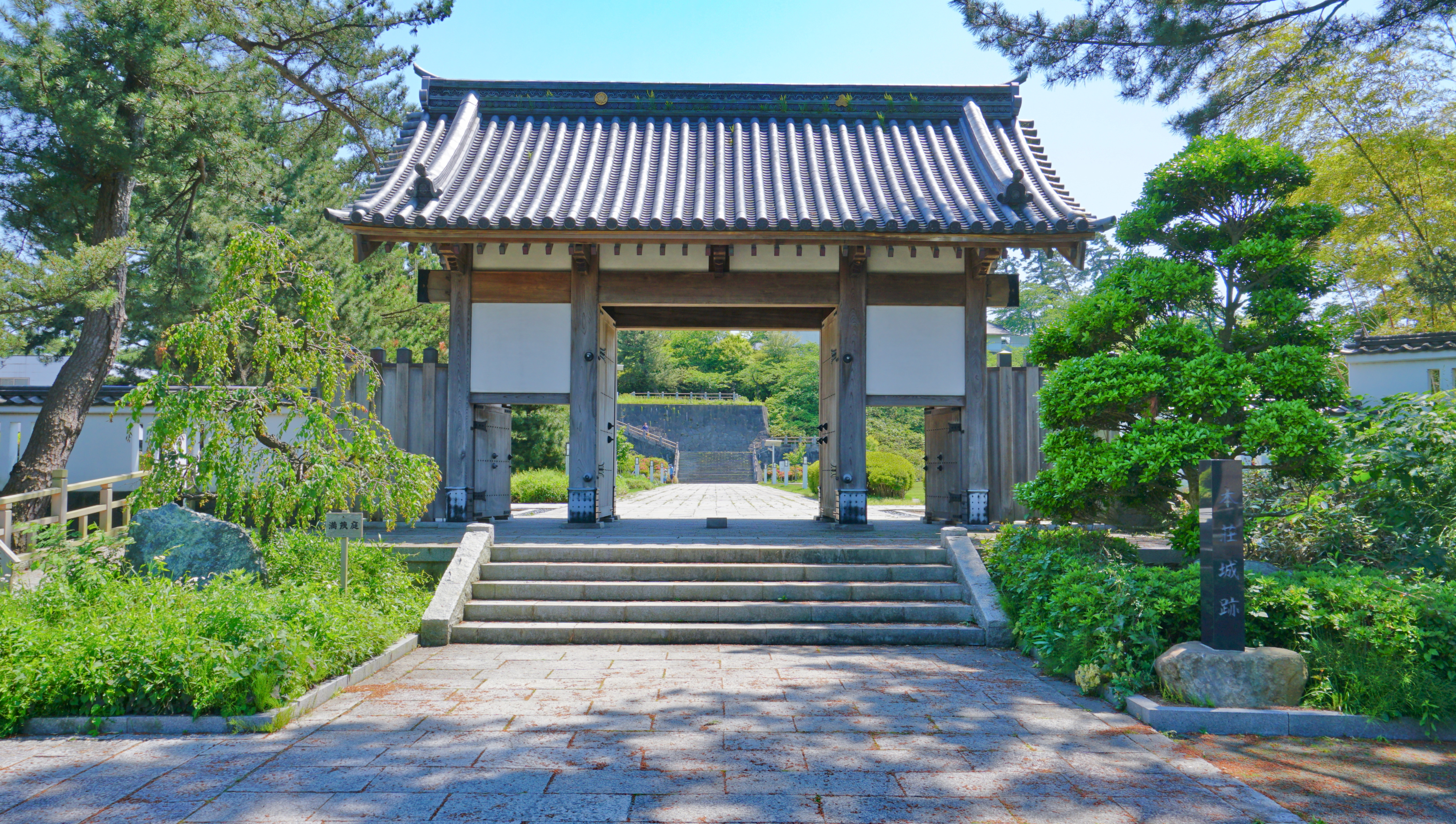
- Reconstructed gate of Honjō Castle

Site information
- Type: hirayama-style Japanese castle
- Open to the public: yes

Location
- Honjō Castle
- Location within Akita Prefecture Location within Japan

Site history
- Built: 1613
- Built by: Tateoka Mitsushige, rebuilt by Rokugō Masanori
- In use: Edo period
- Demolished: 1868

Honjō Castle (本荘城, Honjō-jō) is a Japanese castle located in Yurihonjō, southern Akita Prefecture, Japan. At the end of the Edo period, Honjō Castle was home to the Rokugō clan, daimyō of Honjō Domain. The castle was also known as "Tsurumai-jō" (鶴舞城) or "Ozaki-jō" (尾崎城).

== History ==
Tateoka Mitsushige, a vassal of Mogami Yoshiaki during the Sengoku period, erected Honjō Castle in 1613 on a hill in the center of the Yuri region of central Dewa Province as the administrative center of his 45,000 koku domain. However, the Mogami were dispossessed by the Tokugawa shogunate in 1622, with the majority of their holdings going to the Satake clan, who were transferred from Hitachi Province to their new (and much smaller) holdings at Kubota Domain. At that time, Rokugō Masanori, a minor daimyō with many scattered holdings, was also transferred to Dewa Province, and his holdings were concentrated into the compact 20,000 koku Honjō Domain, which his descendants ruled for 11 generations to the Meiji Restoration.

During the Boshin War, Honjō Domain sided with the Ōuetsu Reppan Dōmei, and Honjō Castle was attacked and destroyed by forces of the led by the pro-imperial forces of Shōnai Domain in August 1868.

== Description ==
Honjō Castle was built in three concentric layers on a low hill, with the main bailey in the center at the highest elevation, and the second bailey and third bailey forming terraces built by earthwork rather than stone walls, and each surrounded by a moat.

The ruins of the site are now part of Honjō Castle Park (本荘城公園, Honjō-jō-kōen), where a portion of the moats, earthworks and a gate have been reconstructed.

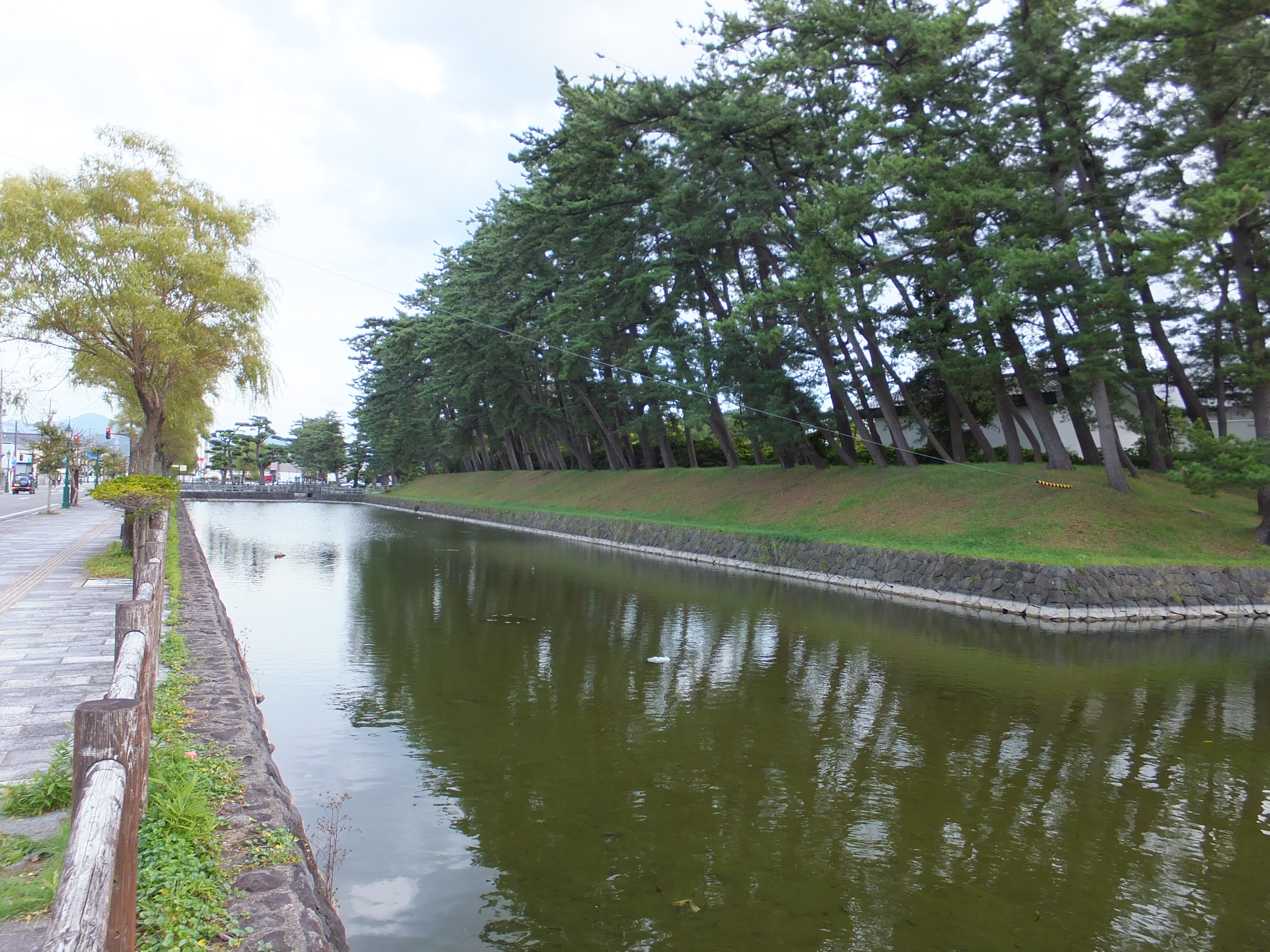
A section of the moat around Honjō Castle.

== Literature ==
- Schmorleitz, Morton S. (1974). Castles in Japan. Tokyo: Charles E. Tuttle Co. pp. 144–145. ISBN 0-8048-1102-4.
- Motoo, Hinago (1986). Japanese Castles. Tokyo: Kodansha. ISBN 0-87011-766-1.
- Mitchelhill, Jennifer (2004). Castles of the Samurai: Power and Beauty. Tokyo: Kodansha. ISBN 4-7700-2954-3.
- Turnbull, Stephen (2003). Japanese Castles 1540–1640. Osprey Publishing. ISBN 1-84176-429-9.
