= Prestige International Aranmare Akita =

Prestige International Aranmare Akita プレステージ・インターナショナル・アランマーレ秋田
- League: Women's Japan Basketball League
- Founded: 2015
- Arena: Masuda Gymnasium
- Location: Araya Torikimachi 1-172, Akita, Akita 010-1633
- Team colors: Orange, Navy blue
- President: Shinichi Tamagami
- General manager: Hirofumi Kojima
- Head coach: Hirofumi Kojima
- Assistant: Ken Takahashi
- Ownership: Prestige International
- Website: www.aranmare.jp/basketball/
Home	Away

The Prestige International Aranmare Akita (Japanese: プレステージ・インターナショナル・アランマーレ秋田) are a professional basketball club based in Akita that play in the Women's Japan Basketball League. Aranmare also has a volleyball team in Sakata, Shonai, and a handball team in Imizu, Toyama.

== Current roster ==
Prestige International Aranmare Akita roster
Players
Coaches

Pos.	No.	Nat.	Name
SG	1	(Japan)	Mahoko Hisaoka (C)
PF	2	(Japan)	Rikako Kayo
G	4	(Japan)	Natsumi Obama
PF	5	(Japan)	Yuki Furuya
SG	6	(Japan)	Nana Tamada
C	9	(Japan)	Fuka Tanabe
C	11	(Japan)	Hitomi Kawase
C	12	(Japan)	Kadija Konate
PG	13	(Japan)	Monami Nakajima
SG	14	(Japan)	Kaede Kodama
PG	15	(Japan)	Natsuki Sunagawa
C	23	(Japan)	Asuka Hiramatsu
SG	24	(Japan)	Ayaka Ozawa
SG	33	(Japan)	Yoko Tanaka
SF	37	(Japan)	Hikaru Sato
SG	50	(Japan)	Chihiro Sato

Head coach

(Japan) Hirofumi Kojima

Assistant coach(es)

(Japan) Ken Takahashi

Legend

- (C) Team captain
- Injured

- Roster
Updated: 2021

Note: Flags indicate national team eligibility at FIBA-sanctioned events. Players may hold other non-FIBA nationalities not displayed.

== Notable players ==
- Hitomi Kawase (zh-yue)
- Chihiro Sato (zh-yue)
- Natsuki Sunagawa (zh-yue)
- Fuka Tanabe (zh-yue)
- Yoko Tanaka (zh-yue)

== Coaches ==
- Saori Kamihigoshi
- Soshi Yasuda
- Sun Jieping
- Koki Sagara
- Hirofumi Kojima
- Asami Tanaka
- Ken Takahashi

== Practice facilities ==
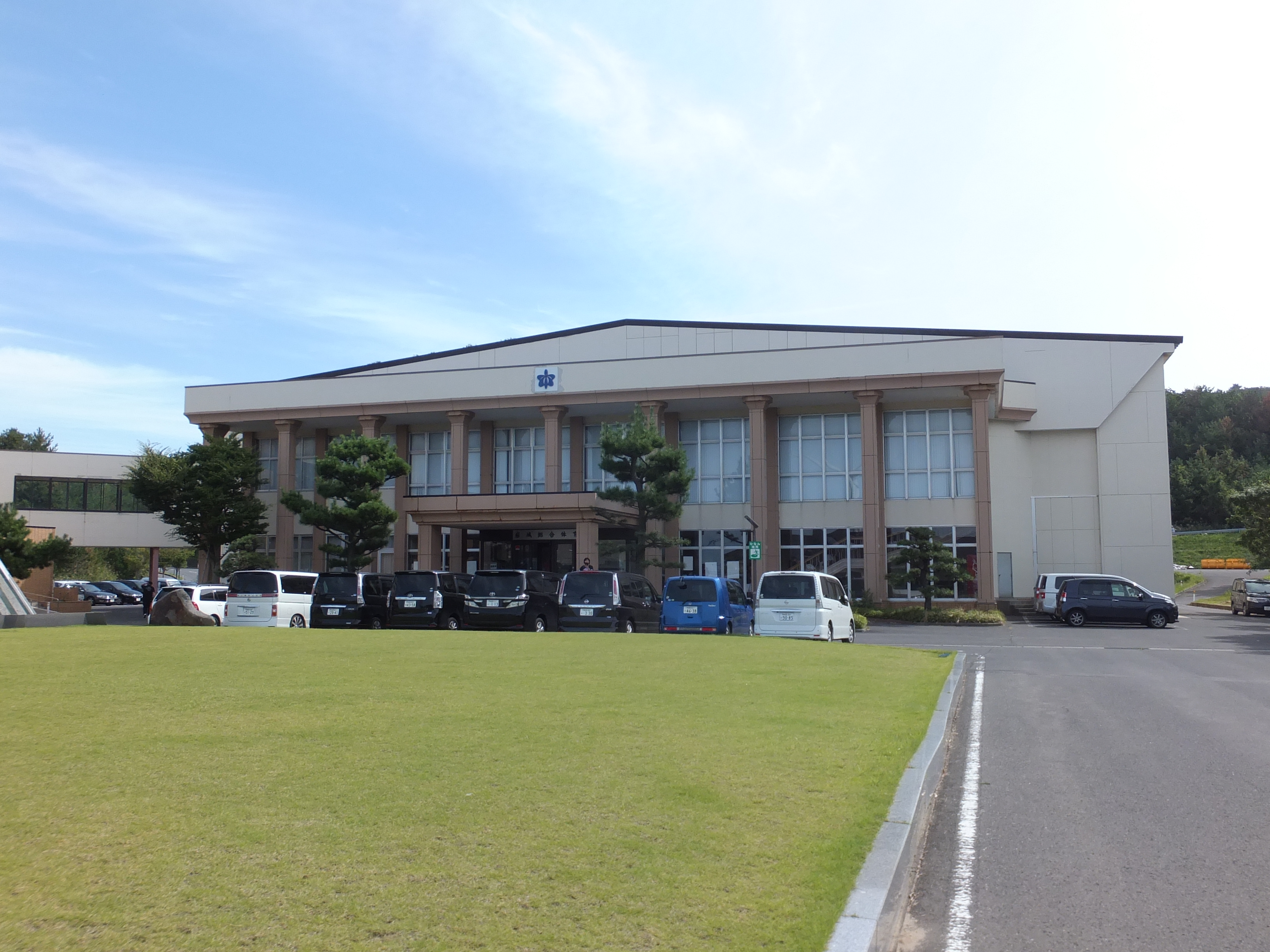
Iwaki General Gymnasium

- Prestige International Akita Gymnasium
- Iwaki General Gymnasium (39°32′36.5″N 140°03′26.8″E)
- Matsugasaki Gymnasium (39°29′49.8″N 140°03′7.0″E)
- Akita Municipal Seibu Gymnasium
- Akita University of Art Gymnasium

== Former players ==
- Chen Ying
- Manami Dehara
- Arisa Echigoya
- Sayaka Fukuda
- Megumi Fujimori
- Takumi Fujiwara
- Yoka Hanada
- Yuno Hiyama
- Yuna Horita
- Yume Ito
- Misako Iwasaki
- Kasumi Kakinuma
- Mai Kobayashi
- An Komasawa
- Mana Muraki
- Saki Nagata
- Ayumi Narita
- Yo Nishimura
- Yumi Osato
- Nanami Sawada
- Yutsuki Takahashi
- Fuka Tanabe
- Yuka Toki
- Midori Tsujimoto
- Momola Udo
- Qiu Yu-Bao
- Zhang Qi-Fang

== Venues ==
- Akita Prefectural Gymnasium
- Akita Prefectural Training Center Arena
- Barajima Gymnasium
- CNA Arena Akita
- Gojome Gymnasium
- Kazuno Memorial Sports Center
- Kazuno Training Center Alpas
- Masuda Gymnasium
- Misato General Gymnasium Lirios
- Nices Arena
- Omonogawa Gymnasium
- Sun Sportsland Kyowa Gymnasium
- Sun Village Nakasen Gymnasium
- Ugo General Gymnasium
- Yamamoto Gymnasium
- Yokote Gymnasium
- Yuzawa Shohoku High School Gymnasium

== See also ==
- Akita Bank Red Arrows
- Prestige International Aranmare Yamagata
