= Iwaki General Gymnasium =

Indoor sporting arena in Iwaki, Yurihonjo, Akita, Japan

Iwaki General Gymnasium 岩城総合体育館
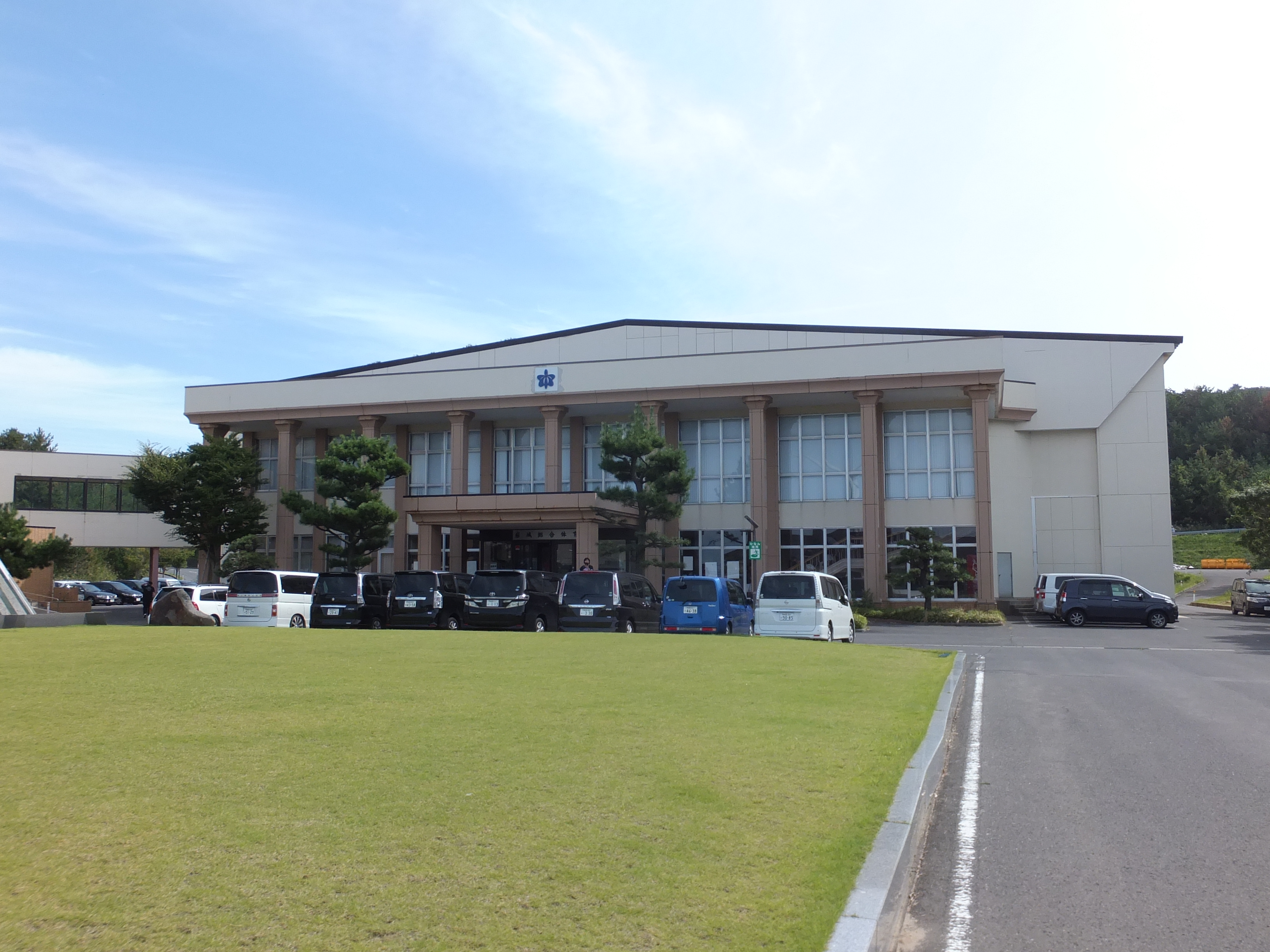

- Location within Akita Prefecture Location within Japan
- Interactive map of Iwaki General Gymnasium 岩城総合体育館
- Full name: Iwaki General Gymnasium
- Location: Shintsurugata 50, Iwakiuchimichikawa, Yurihonjo City, Akita Prefecture
- Coordinates: (39°32′36.5″N 140°03′26.8″E)
- Owner: City of Yurihonjo
- Operator: City of Yurihonjo
- Parking: 200 spaces

Tenant
- Prestige International Aranmare Akita (practice)

Iwaki General Gymnasium (岩城総合体育館) is an indoor sporting arena located in Iwaki, Yurihonjo, Akita, Japan. It hosts indoor sporting events such as basketball and volleyball and is practice home to the Prestige International Aranmare Akita that will play in the Women's Japan Basketball League.

== Facilities ==
- Main arena - 1,360m^{2} （40m×34m）

== See also ==
- Yurihonjo Arena
- Matsugasaki Gymnasium
