= Omonogawa Gymnasium =

Indoor sporting arena in Omonogawa, Yokote, Akita, Japan

Omonogawa Gymnasium 雄物川体育館
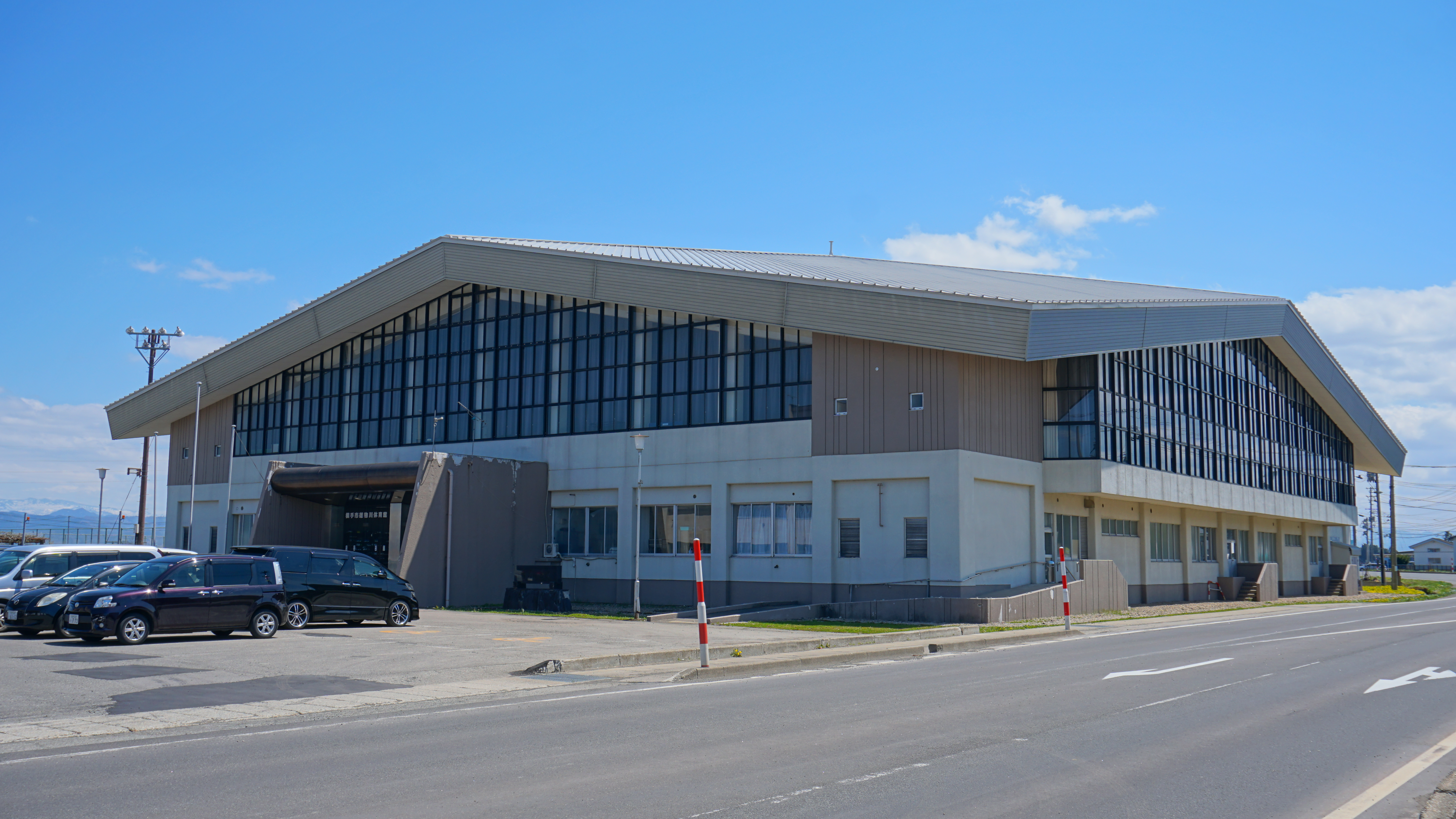

- Location within Akita Prefecture Location within Japan
- Interactive map of Omonogawa Gymnasium 雄物川体育館
- Full name: Yokote Municipal Omonogawa Gymnasium
- Location: Aza Maedaomote 7, Imajuku, Omonogawamachi Yokote City, Akita Prefecture
- Coordinates: (39°17′22.5″N 140°25′55.9″E)
- Owner: City of Yokote
- Operator: City of Yokote
- Capacity: 4,000
- Parking: 70 spaces

Omonogawa Gymnasium (雄物川体育館) is an indoor sporting arena located in Omonogawa, Yokote, Akita, Japan. It hosts indoor sporting events such as basketball, volleyball and table tennis. It hosted National Sports Festival of Japan volleyball games in 2007.

== Facilities ==
- Main arena - 1,400m^{2}
- Training room - 280m^{2}
- 3 Conference rooms - 40m^{2}, 62m^{2}, 62m^{2}
- 2 Changing rooms -36m^{2}x2
- Stage - 160m^{2}

== See also ==
- Keishi Handa
- Makoto Hasegawa
- Mitsuaki Sato
- Kohei Suzuki
- Daisuke Usami
- Tomoko Yamatoya
