= Hiraka =

Hiraka (Japanese: 平加) is a word of Japanese origin that may refer to:

- Hiraka, Akita, a town in Japan
- Hiraka, Aomori, a city in Japan
  - Hiraka Station, principal railway station of the city
- Hiraka District, Akita, a former Japanese rural district
- Yurina Hiraka (born 1991), Japanese long jumper
