= Korfball at the 2001 World Games =

- Venue: Aspal Gymnasium
- Location: (Japan) Rokugo, Akita
- Dates: 18–22 August 2001
- Competitors: 94 from 6 nations

Medalists
gold medal	Netherlands
silver medal	Belgium
bronze medal	Chinese Taipei

The korfball event at the 2001 World Games in Akita, Japan took place between the 18th and the 22nd of August. A total of 96 athletes from 6 national teams entered the competition. The competition took place in Aspal Gymnasium.

== Competition format ==
In preliminary round teams played in two groups. Winners of the groups advanced to the final. Second place teams played with third place teams, and winners of this match advanced to the bronze medal final. Also fifth place match was held.

== Teams ==
- Australia
- Belgium
- Chinese Taipei
- (United Kingdom) Great Britain
- Netherlands
- Portugal

== Preliminary round ==
=== Group A ===
Pos	Team	Pld	W	L	GF	GA	GD	Pts	Qualification
1	Netherlands	2	2	0	60	20	+40	4	Final
2	Portugal	2	1	1	34	43	−9	3	3–6th place semifinals
3	Australia	2	0	2	22	53	−31	2	3–6th place semifinals

Source: 2001 World Games

August 18, 2001	Netherlands	29–12	Portugal	Omonogawa, Akita
				Stadium: Aspal Gymnasium

August 19, 2001	Australia	8–38	Netherlands	Omonogawa, Akita
				Stadium: Aspal Gymnasium

August 20, 2001	Portugal	22–14	Australia	Omonogawa, Akita
				Stadium: Aspal Gymnasium

=== Group B ===
Pos	Team	Pld	W	L	GF	GA	GD	Pts	Qualification
1	Belgium	2	2	0	41	24	+17	4	Final
2	Chinese Taipei	2	1	1	26	24	+2	3	3–6th place semifinals
3	Great Britain	2	0	2	23	42	−19	2	3–6th place semifinals

Source: 2001 World Games

August 18, 2001	Belgium	16–9	Chinese Taipei	Omonogawa, Akita
				Stadium: Aspal Gymnasium

August 19, 2001	Great Britain	15–25	Belgium	Omonogawa, Akita
				Stadium: Aspal Gymnasium

August 20, 2001	Chinese Taipei	17–8	Great Britain	Omonogawa, Akita
				Stadium: Aspal Gymnasium

== Knockout stage ==
=== 3–6th place semifinals ===
August 21, 2001	Portugal	15–12	Great Britain	Omonogawa, Akita
				Stadium: Aspal Gymnasium

August 21, 2001	Chinese Taipei	18–12	Australia	Omonogawa, Akita
				Stadium: Aspal Gymnasium

=== Fifth place game ===
August 22, 2001	Great Britain	13–12	Australia	Omonogawa, Akita
				Stadium: Aspal Gymnasium

=== Third place game ===
August 22, 2001	Portugal	16–17	Chinese Taipei	Omonogawa, Akita
				Stadium: Aspal Gymnasium

=== Final ===
August 22, 2001	Netherlands	22–10	Belgium	Omonogawa, Akita
				Stadium: Aspal Gymnasium

== Final ranking ==
Rank	Team
Gold medal	Netherlands
Silver medal	Belgium
Bronze medal	Chinese Taipei
4	Portugal
5	(United Kingdom) Great Britain
6	Australia
