= Daigo Station =

Daigo Station is the name of multiple train stations in Japan.

- Daigo Station (Akita) - (醍醐駅) in Akita Prefecture
- Daigo Station (Kyoto) - (醍醐駅) in Kyoto Prefecture
