= Yokote Gymnasium =

Gymnasium in Yokote, Akita Prefecture, Japan

Yokote Gymnasium 横手体育館
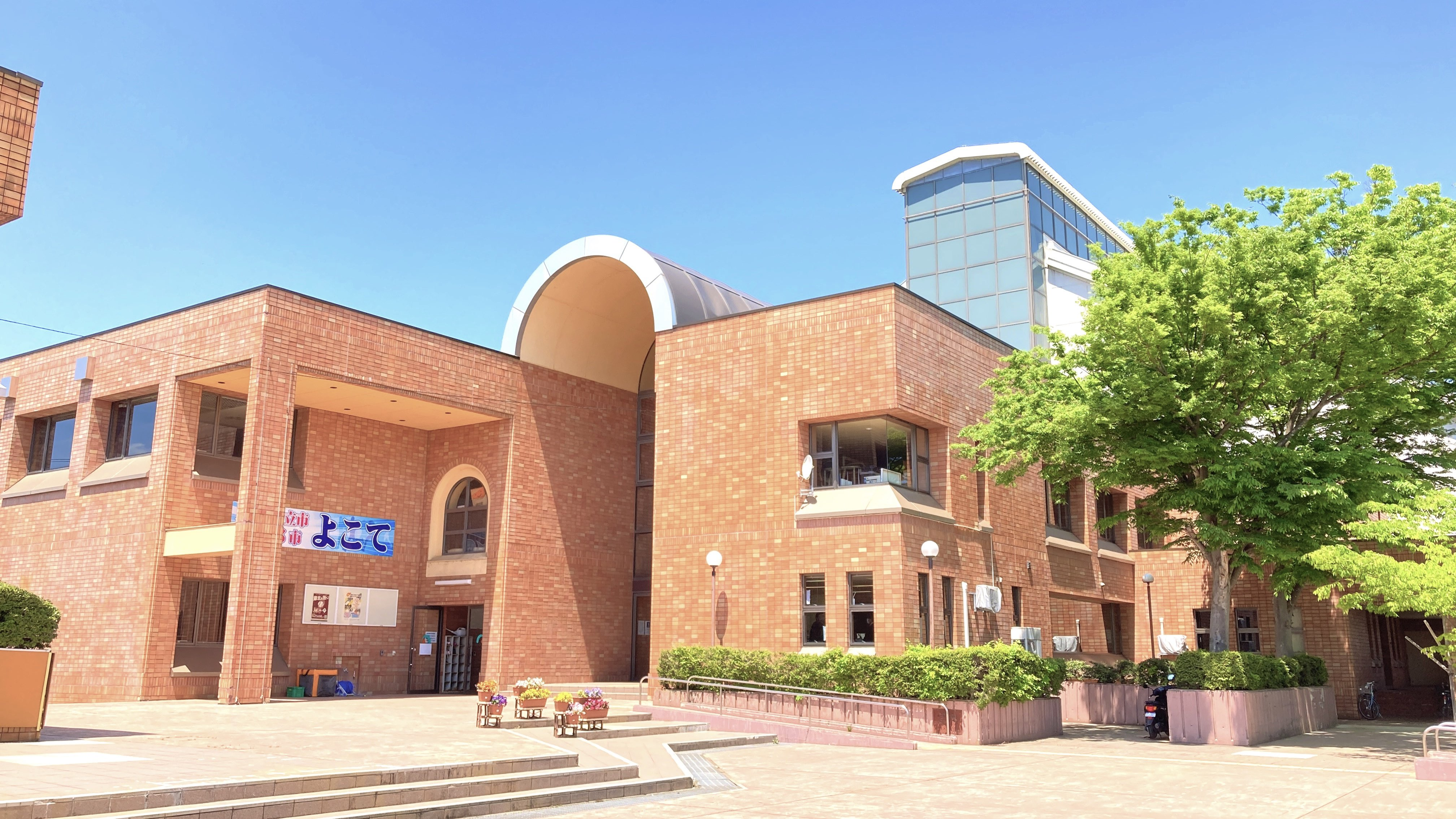

- Location within Akita Prefecture Location within Japan
- Interactive map of Yokote Gymnasium 横手体育館
- Full name: Yokote Municipal Yokote Gymnasium
- Location: 2-40, Jori 2-chome, Yokote City, Akita Prefecture
- Coordinates: (39°18′45.7″N 140°33′8.3″E)
- Owner: City of Yokote
- Operator: City of Yokote
- Parking: 160 spaces

Tenant
- Prestige International Aranmare Akita

Yokote Gymnasium (横手体育館) is an indoor sporting arena located in Yokote, Akita, Japan. It hosts indoor sporting events such as basketball, volleyball and table tennis. It hosted National Sports Festival of Japan men's volleyball games in 2007. Japan women's national basketball team, Japan national 3x3 team, and Japan women's national 3x3 team practiced here.

== Facilities ==
- Main arena - 1,512m^{2} （42m×36m）
- Medium arena - 448m^{2} （28m×16m）
- Small arena - 192m^{2} （16m×12m）
- Martial arts area - 156m^{2} （13m×12m）
- Conference room
- Shower rooms
