= Tomura Yoshinori =

- 戸村 義得
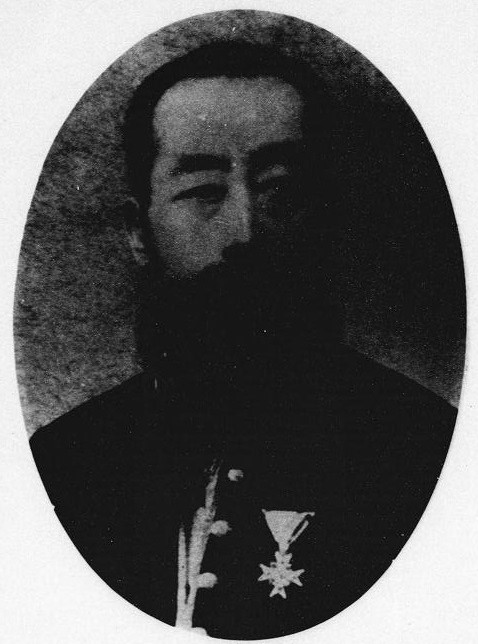
- Born: 1849; Yokote, Kubota Domain, Tokugawa shogunate
- Died: May 1906 (aged 56–57)
- Military career
- Allegiance: Kubota Domain; Empire of Japan
- Branch: Imperial Japanese Army
- Service years: 1868 — 1879
- Conflicts: Boshin War: Akita Front; Battle of Yokote

Tomura Yoshinori (戸村義得; May 1849 – 1906), also known as Tomura Daigaku (戸村大学) was a Japanese general and businessman hailing from the Kubota Domain and founder of the 48th National Bank during the Bakumatsu period of Japan.

== Biography ==
Tomura was a member of the Satake clan and his father is Tomura Yoshikata. He was born in Yokote in May 1849. On August 3, 1868, when his father became a chief retainer of the Kubota Domain, he was handed over to Yokote Shodai. In the Boshin War, Tomura participated in the Akita Front as he fought against the Ōuetsu Reppan Dōmei forces attacking Yokote Castle at the age of 19 without reinforcements from the main clan and the Ouetsu Governor's Office, but surrendered in the Battle of Yokote.

In 1879, with the founding of the 48th National Bank (later Akita Bank), he became president as one of the founders but he retired the following year and became a director.

In May 1880, he became the deputy principal of Akita Women's Normal School.

In 1884, he became the mayor of Kawabe, and then the mayor of Kazuno and Hiraka.

== Bibliography ==
- Akita Bank's 100 Year History (Akita Bank 100 Year History Compilation Room, 1979 )
- Yokote City History
- 300 Clan Biographical Dictionary (Vassal Encyclopedia Compilation Committee, 1987 )
