= Yokote Kamakura FM =

Yokote Kamakura FM (JOZZ2BC-FM)

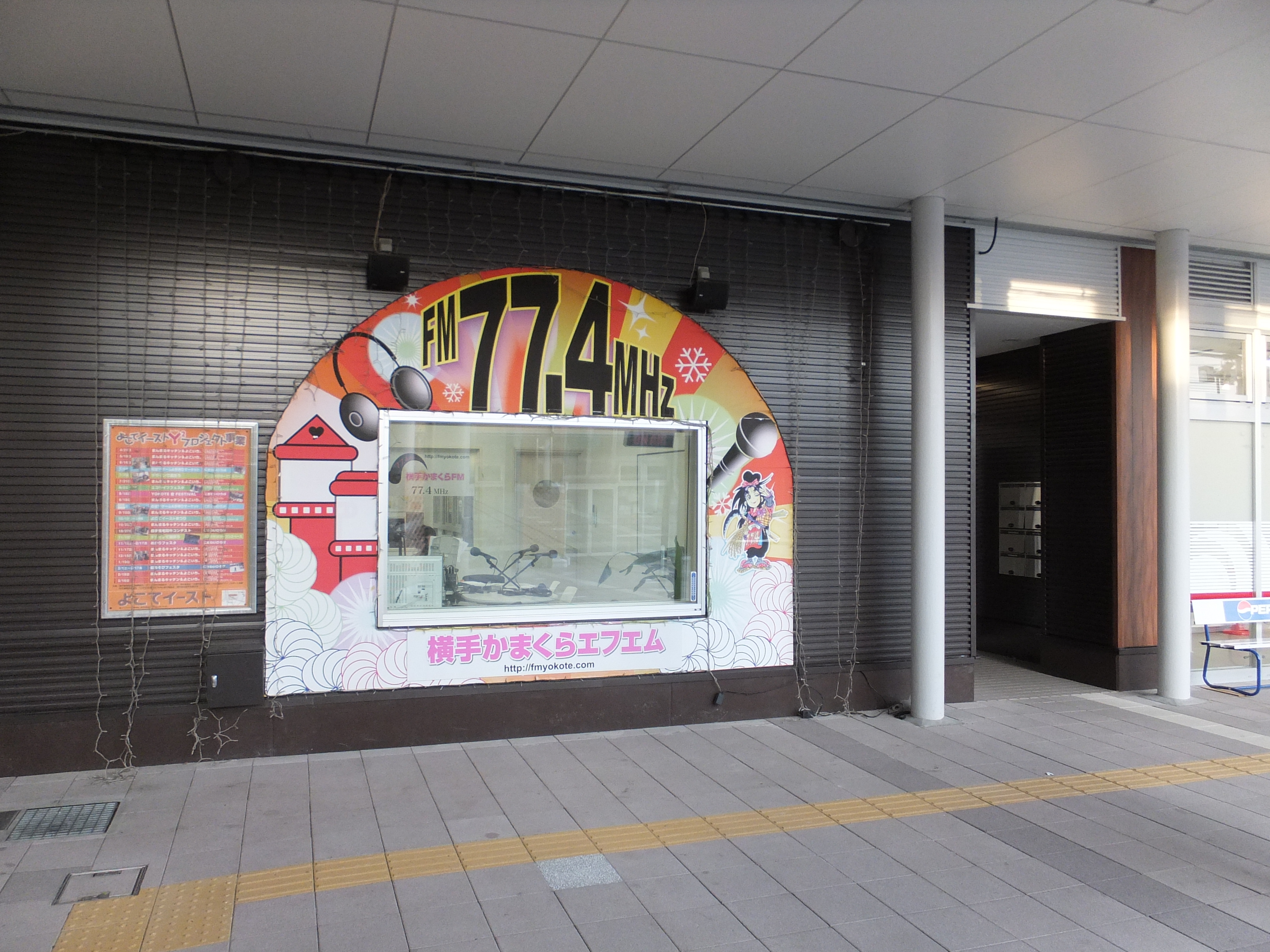
- The Yokote Kamakura FM studio

Yokote, Akita; Japan
- Frequency: 77.4 MHz

Programming
- Language: Japanese
- Format: Music/Talk

History
- First air date: April 1, 2011

Technical information
- Transmitter coordinates: 39°18′19.9″N 140°34′01.0″E

Links
- Webcast: http://hdv3.nkansai.tv/yokote
- Website: Official website

Yokote Community FM Broadcasting Co., Ltd. (横手コミュニティFM放送株式会社, Yokote Komyuniti FM Hoso Kabushiki-gaisha) is a Japanese FM station based in Yokote, Akita, Japan.

== Stations ==
- Yokote 77.4 MHz 20 W 39°18′19.9″N 140°34′01.0″E
- Omori 77.4 MHz 20 W 39°21′18.9″N 140°26′00.0″E
- Masuda 77.4 MHz 20 W 39°12′12.6″N 140°33′27.5″E
- Sannai 77.4 MHz 20 W
- Saruhannai 77.4 MHz 20 W
- Nango 77.4 MHz 20 W
- Saruhannai 77.4 MHz 20 W 39°09′50.4″N 140°37′18.0″E
- Horowa 77.4 MHz 10 W 39°22′14.7″N 140°21′20.6″E
- Sakabe 77.4 MHz 10 W 39°22′02.9″N 140°17′00.1″E
- Yoshiyachi 77.4 MHz 10 W
- Ueda 77.4 MHz 10 W 39°13′37.7″N 140°27′40.2″E
- Kanezawa 77.4 MHz 5 W 39°22′39.8″N 140°34′27.1″E
