= Sannai, Akita =

Dissolved municipality in Akita prefecture, Japan

San'nai (山内村, San'nai-mura) was a village located in Hiraka District, Akita Prefecture, Japan.

== Population ==
In 2003, the village had an estimated population of 4,364 and a density of 21.22 persons per km^{2}. The total area was 205.68 km^{2}.

== History ==
On October 1, 2005, Sannai, along with the towns of Hiraka, Jūmonji, Masuda, Omonogawa and Ōmori; and the village of Taiyū (all from Hiraka District), was merged into the expanded city of Yokote.
