= Jūmonji, Akita =

Dissolved municipality in Akita prefecture, Japan

Jūmonji (十文字町, Jūmonji-machi) was a town located in Hiraka District, Akita Prefecture, Japan.

In 2003, the town had an estimated population of 14,198 and a density of 375.61 persons per km^{2}. The total area was 37.80 km^{2}.

On October 1, 2005, Jūmonji, along with the towns of Hiraka, Masuda, Omonogawa and Ōmori; and the villages of Sannai and Taiyū (all from Hiraka District), was merged into the expanded city of Yokote.
