= Ōmori, Akita =

Ōmori 大森町
- Former settlement
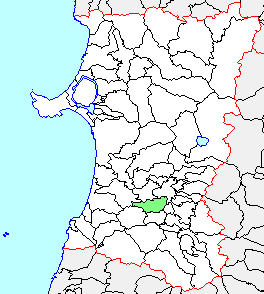
- Interactive map of Ōmori
- Country: Japan
- Prefecture: Akita
- District: Hiraka

Ōmori (大森町, Ōmori-machi) was a town located in Hiraka District, Akita Prefecture, Japan.

In 2003, the town had an estimated population of 7,757 and a density of 75.88 persons per km^{2}. The total area was 102.23 km^{2}.

On October 1, 2005, Ōmori, along with the towns of Hiraka, Jūmonji, Masuda and Omonogawa; and the villages of Sannai and Taiyū (all from Hiraka District), was merged into the expanded city of Yokote.
