= Masuda, Akita =

Dissolved municipality in Akita prefecture, Japan

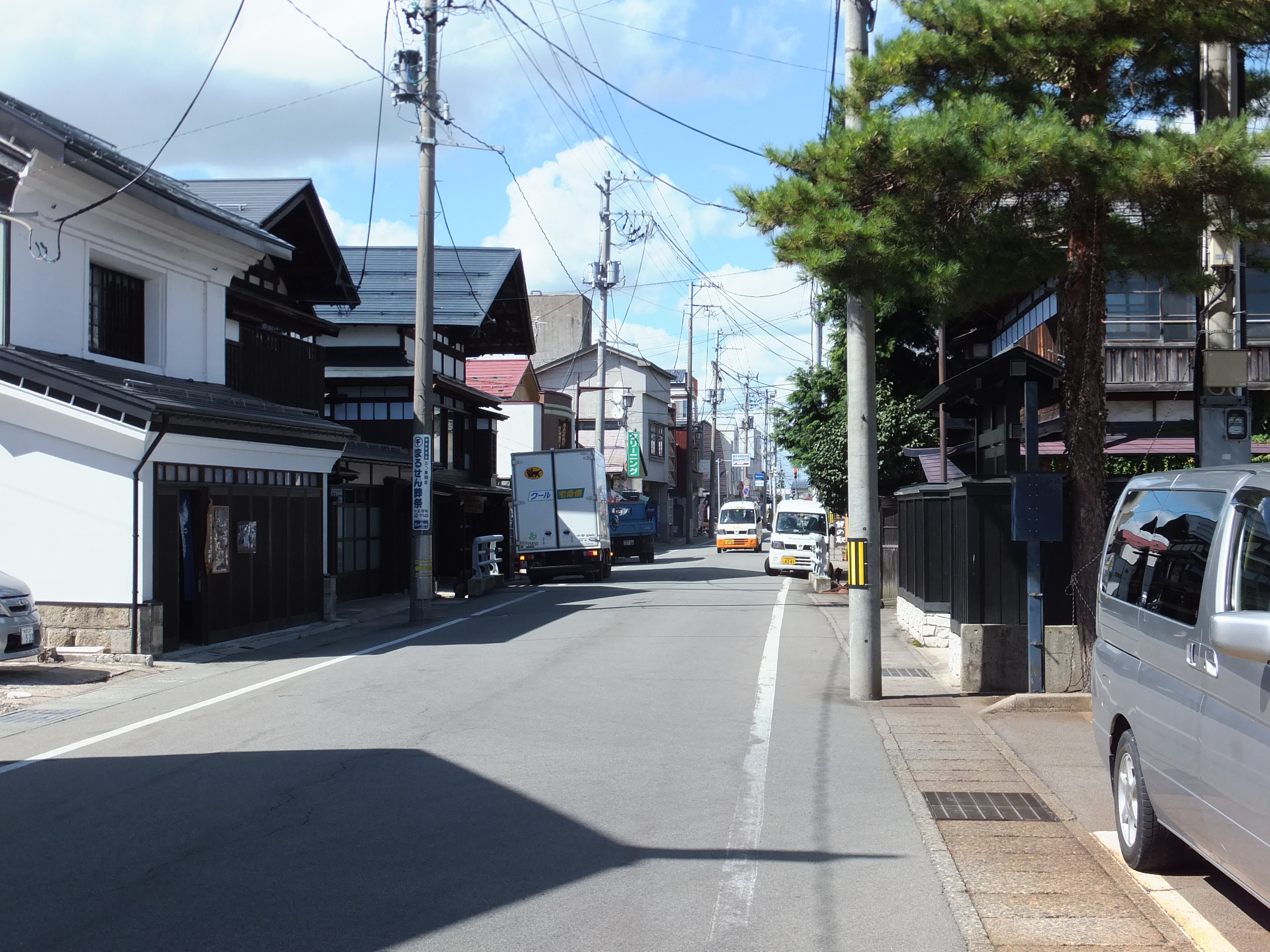
Street in Masuda, Yokote

Masuda (増田町, Masuda-machi) was a town located in Hiraka District, Akita Prefecture, Japan.

In 2003, the town had an estimated population of 8,733 and a density of 117.68 persons per km^{2}. The total area was 74.21 km^{2}.

On October 1, 2005, Masuda, along with the towns of Hiraka, Jūmonji, Omonogawa and Ōmori; and the villages of Sannai and Taiyū (all from Hiraka District), was merged into the expanded city of Yokote.

== Notable people ==
- Tōshirō Ishida
