= Hirofumi Kojima =

Japanese basketball coach

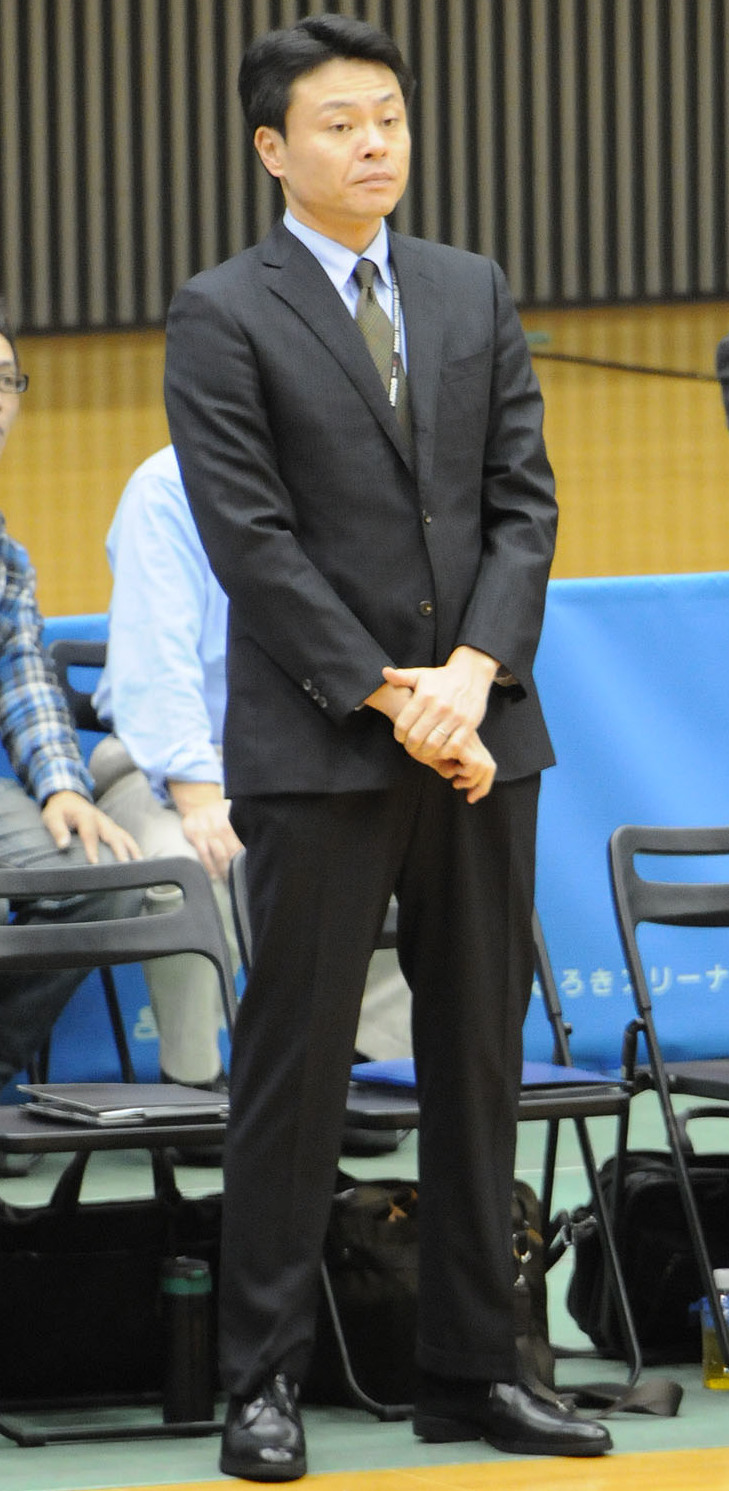
- Kojima in 2010

Prestige International Aranmare Akita
- Position: General manager/Head coach
- League: Women's Japan Basketball League

Personal information
- Born: July 23, 1967 (age 59) Izumi-ku, Yokohama

Career information
- High school: Shoyo (Izumi-ku, Yokohama)
- College: Aoyama Gakuin University
- Coaching career: 1991–present

Career history

Coaching
- 1991–1997: NEC (asst)
- 1998-2000: Japan women's (asst)
- 1999–2000: Saginomiya Wings (asst)
- 2000–2008: Yamagata Bank
- 2008–2010: Denso Iris (asst)
- 2011: Japan women's U24
- 2010–2019: Denso Iris
- 2012: Japan women's (asst)
- 2019–present: Prestige International Aranmare Akita
Medals
Men's basketball
Representing Japan
Asian Games
Gold medal – first place	1998 Bangkok	Japan

Hirofumi Kojima (小嶋裕二三, Kojima Hirofumi) is a Japanese basketball coach. He was the assistant coach of the Japan women's national basketball team from 1998 to 2000 and 2012.

== Honors ==
- National Sports Festival of Japan title (2006)

== Head coaching record ==
Legend
Regular season	G	Games coached	W	Games won	L	Games lost	W–L %	Win–loss %
Playoffs	PG	Playoff games	PW	Playoff wins	PL	Playoff losses	PW–L %	Playoff win–loss %

Team	Year	G	W	L	W–L%	Finish	PG	PW	PL	PW–L%	Result
Denso	2010-11	38	19	9	.679	3rd	3	1	2	.333	3rd
Denso	2011-12	28	20	8	.714	3rd	2	0	2	.000	3rd
Denso	2012-13	29	12	17	.414	7th	-	-	-	–	7th
Denso	2013-14	33	26	7	.788	3rd	6	2	4	.333	Runners-up
Denso	2014-15	30	24	6	.800	2nd	2	0	2	.000	3rd
Denso	2015-16	24	16	8	.667	4th	2	0	2	.000	4th
Denso	2016-17	27	15	12	.556	5th	2	0	2	.000	3rd
Denso	2017-18	33	26	7	.788	2nd	3	2	1	.667	Runners-up
Denso	2018-19	22	15	7	.682	4th	3	1	2	.333	4th
