= Taiyū, Akita =

Dissolved municipality in Akita prefecture, Japan

Taiyū (大雄村, Taiyū-mura) was a village located in Hiraka District, Akita Prefecture, Japan.

In 2003, the village had an estimated population of 5,635 and a density of 215.24 persons per km^{2}. The total area was 26.18 km^{2}.

On October 1, 2005, Taiyū, along with the towns of Hiraka, Jūmonji, Masuda, Omonogawa, Ōmori and the village of Sannai (all from Hiraka District), was merged into the expanded city of Yokote.
