= Matsugasaki Gymnasium =

Indoor sporting arena in Matsugasaki, Yurihonjo, Akita, Japan

Matsugasaki Gymnasium 松ケ崎体育館
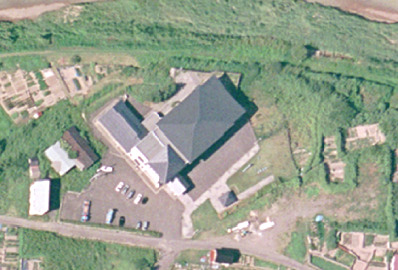

- Location within Akita Prefecture Location within Japan
- Interactive map of Matsugasaki Gymnasium 松ケ崎体育館
- Full name: Matsugasaki Gymnasium
- Location: Aramachi, Matsugasaki, Yurihonjo City, Akita Prefecture
- Coordinates: (39°29′49.8″N 140°03′7.0″E)
- Owner: City of Yurihonjo
- Operator: City of Yurihonjo

Tenant
- Prestige International Aranmare Akita (practice)

Matsugasaki Gymnasium (松ケ崎体育館) is an indoor sporting arena located in Matsugasaki, Yurihonjo, Akita, Japan. It hosts indoor sporting events such as basketball and volleyball and is practice home to the Prestige International Aranmare Akita that will play in the Women's Japan Basketball League.

== Facilities ==
- Main arena - 738m^{2}

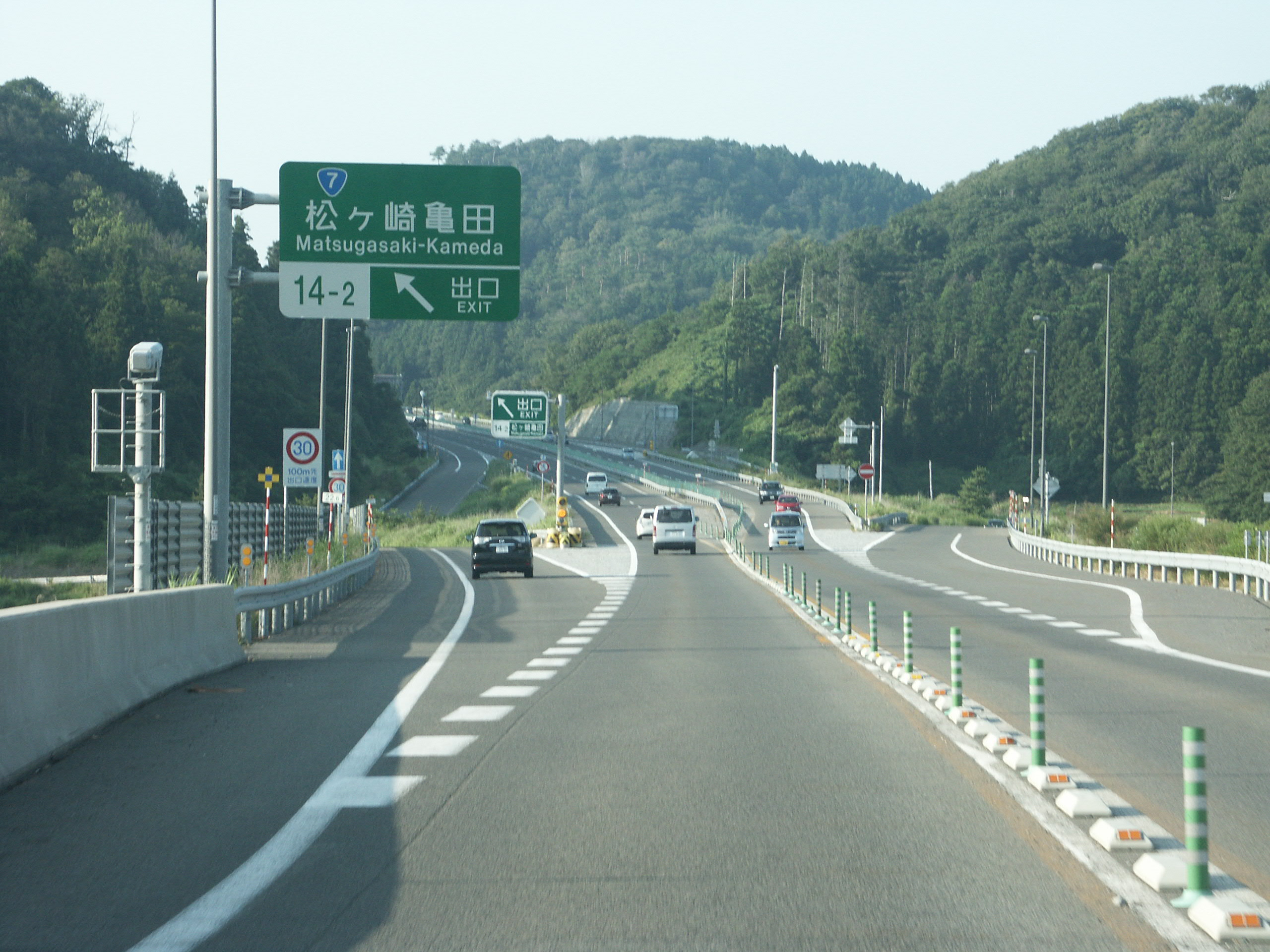
Matsugasaki-Kameda Interchange

== See also ==
- Nices Arena
