= Yanagita Station =

Railway station in Yokote, Akita Prefecture, Japan

Yanagita Station 柳田駅
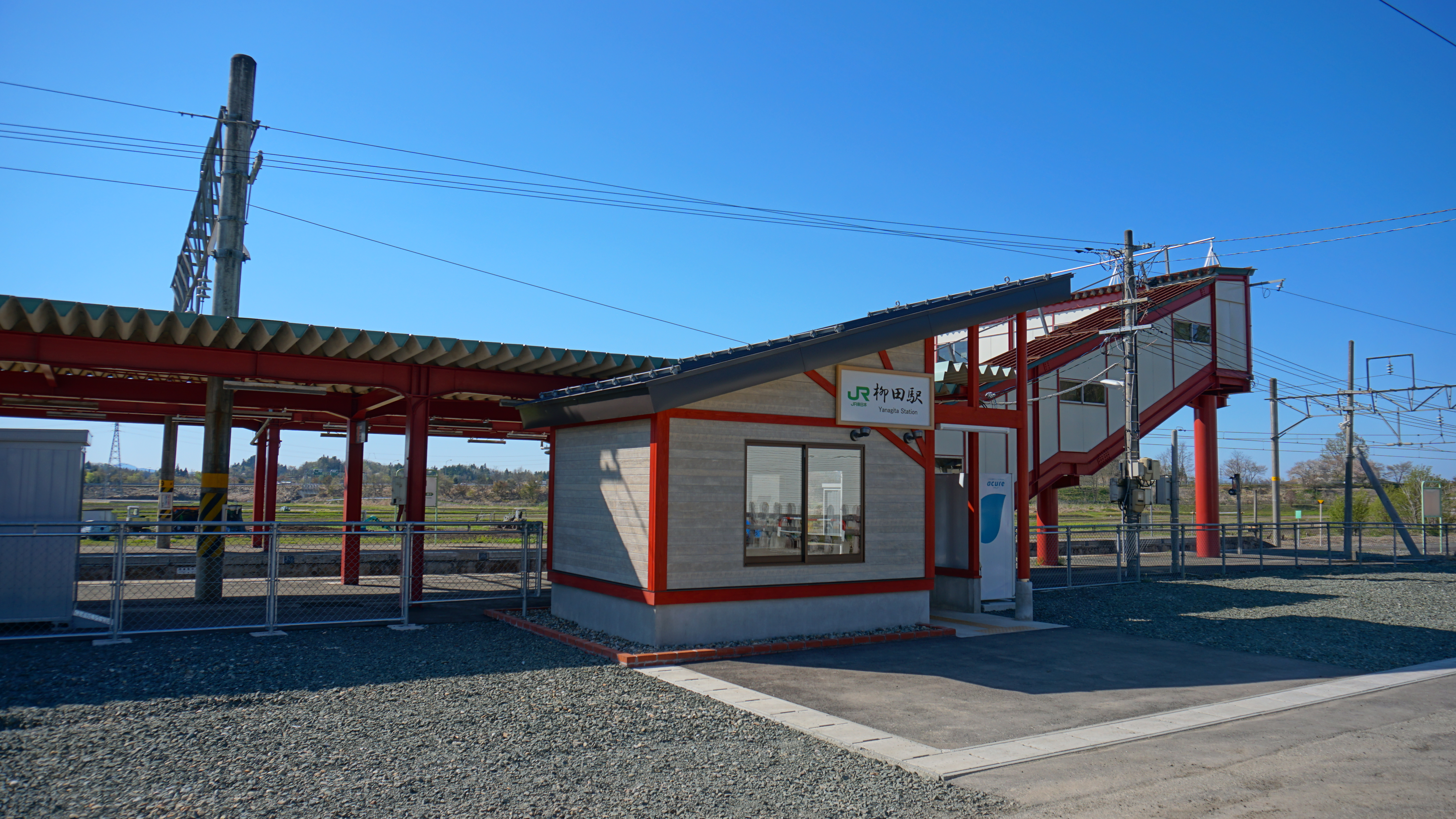
- Yanagita Station in May 2019

General information
- Location: Yanagita 175, Yanagida, Yokote-shi, Akita-ken 013-0054; Japan
- Coordinates: 39°16′35″N 140°33′14.2″E
- Operator: JR East
- Line: ■ Ōu Main Line
- Distance: 224.4 kilometers from Fukushima
- Platforms: 2 side platforms

Other information
- Status: Unstaffed
- Website: Official website

History
- Opened: November 7, 1926

Services
Preceding station	JR East	Following station
Daigo towards Shinjō	Ōu Main Line Local	Yokote towards Aomori
Location
- Location within Akita Prefecture Location within Japan

Yanagita Station (柳田駅, Yanagita-eki) is a railway station on the Ōu Main Line in the city of Yokote, Akita Prefecture, Japan, operated by JR East.

== Lines ==
Yanagita Station is served by the Ōu Main Line, and is located 224.4 km (139.4 mi) from the terminus of the line at Fukushima Station.

== Station layout ==
The station consists of two opposed side platform connected by a footbridge. The station is unattended.

=== Platforms ===
1	■ Ōu Main Line	for Shinjō and Yamagata
2, 3	■ Ōu Main Line	for Ōmagari and Akita

== History ==
Yanagita Station opened on November 7, 1926 as a station on the Japanese Government Railways (JGR), serving the village of Sakae. JGR became the Japanese National Railways (JNR) after World War II. The station was absorbed into the JR East network upon the privatization of JNR on April 1, 1987.

The station building was replaced by a temporary structure in August 2017, with a new building completed in December 2017.

== Surrounding area ==
- Sakae Elementary School
- for Sakae village hall

== See also ==
- List of railway stations in Japan
