= Kenichi Takahashi (basketball) =

Japanese basketball player (born 1980)

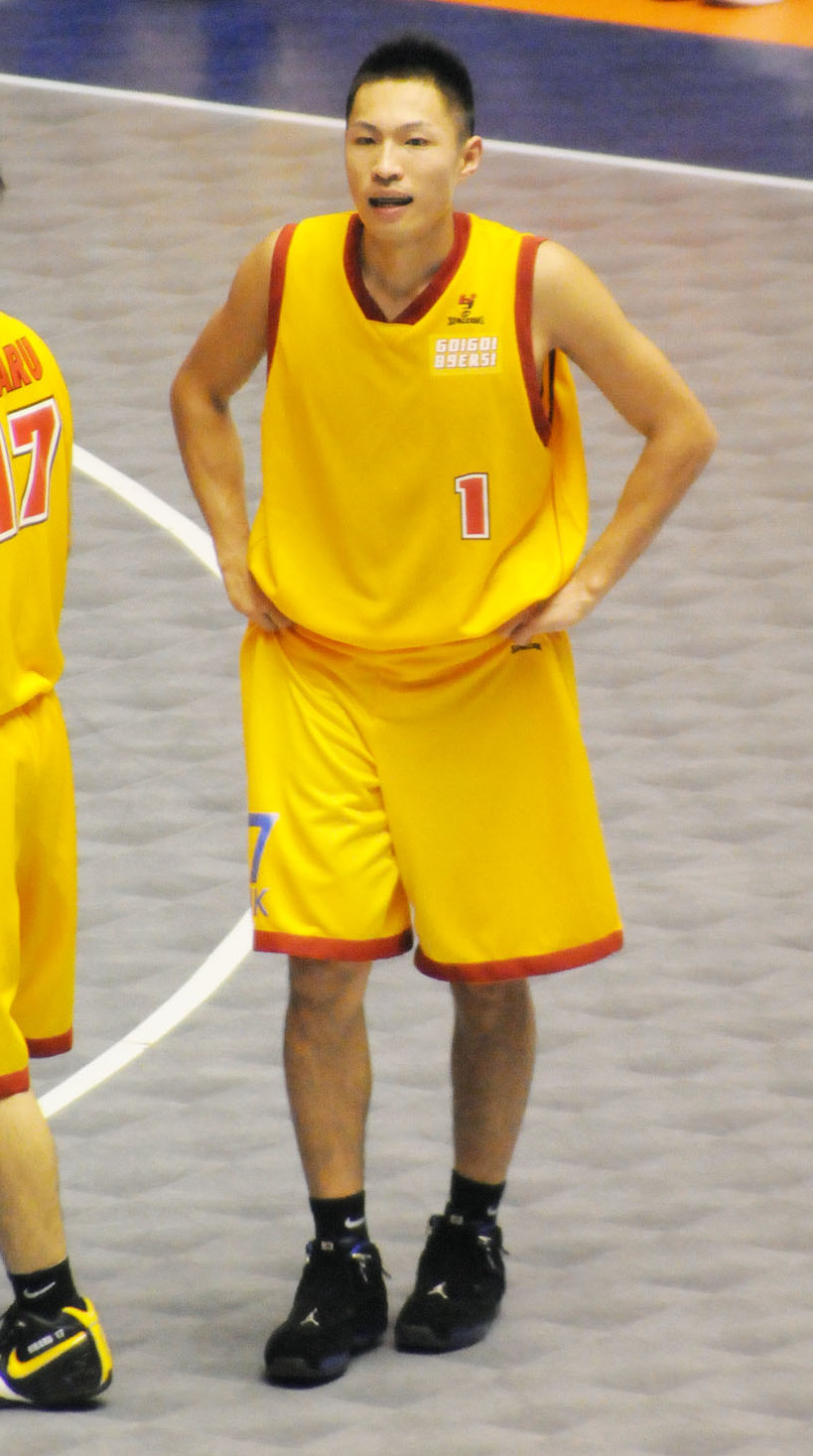
- Takahashi in 2008

Prestige International Aranmare Akita
- Position: Assistant
- League: Women's Japan Basketball League

Personal information
- Born: December 22, 1980 (age 45) Shōwa, Akita, Japan
- Listed height: 5 ft 11 in (1.80 m)
- Listed weight: 168 lb (76 kg)

Career information
- High school: Akita Technical (Akita, Japan)
- College: Tohoku Gakuin (1998–2002)
- Playing career: 2003–2017

Career history

Playing
- 2003–2006: Hitachi Cable
- 2006-2012: Sendai 89ers
- 2012-2014: Iwate Big Bulls
- 2014-2015: Aomori Wat's
- 2015-2017: Akita Northern Happinets

Coaching
- 2019-present: Prestige International Aranmare Akita (assistant)

Career highlights
- bj league Free Throw Pct Leader (2009-10); bj league All-star (2014); JBL2 Rookie of the Year (2003); JBL2 Best Five (2005); JBL2 Assist leader (2005)

Kenichi Takahashi (高橋 憲一, Takahashi Ken'ichi; born December 22, 1980), nicknamed Shocho, is a former Japanese professional basketball player and served for Akita Northern Happinets of the B.League as the ambassador. Takahashi is currently the instructor for Toreiku Katagami. He was selected by the Sendai 89ers with the third overall pick in the 2006 bj League draft. He has played for the four Tohoku clubs of the bj league. In October 2015 he became a one-day honorary police chief at the Akita Higashi Police Station. Since then a police officer salute has become popular among Akita's boosters. Takahashi studies NBA to improve his game, and he is an Air Jordan collector. His retirement memorial game was held at Akita Prefectural Gymnasium on October 29, 2017.

== Career statistics ==
Legend
GP	Games played	GS	Games started	MPG	Minutes per game
FG%	Field goal percentage	3P%	3-point field goal percentage	FT%	Free throw percentage
RPG	Rebounds per game	APG	Assists per game	SPG	Steals per game
BPG	Blocks per game	PPG	Points per game	**Bold**	Career high

*	Led the league

=== Regular season ===
Year	Team	GP	GS	MPG	FG%	3P%	FT%	RPG	APG	SPG	BPG	PPG
2006-07	Sendai	40	40	29.2	37.0	34.6	62.5	0.9	1.8	0.6	0.0	8.5
2007-08	Sendai	41	37	24.1	40.3	32.5	73.8	0.9	2.2	0.7	0.0	6.7
2008-09	Sendai	52	52	28.4	39.4	37.3	76.8	1.4	3.8	0.8	0.1	8.8
2009-10	Sendai	47	45	29.0	39.9	34.7	88.2	1.2	3.6	0.4	0.2	10.9
2010-11	Sendai	32	3	23.0	40.3	37.6	83.7	1.0	2.4	0.3	0.0	7.2
2011-12	Sendai	42	3	11.1	38.8	28.8	70.0	0.5	0.7	0.3	0.0	3.4
2012-13	Iwate	52	49	30.5	43.6	42.5	79.2	1.8	2.7	0.7	0.1	10.3
2013-14	Iwate	52	50	28.9	42.8	37.6	84.5	1.7	3.4	0.8	0.1	10.1
2014-15	Aomori	48	24	21.6	34.4	31.0	87.5	1.5	2.7	0.4	0.1	6.3
2015-16	Akita	52	0	20.0	37.4	34.3	77.8	1.6	2.9	0.3	0.0	4.9
2016-17	Akita	55	2	12.7	36.0	36.4	66.7	0.7	0.7	0.2	0.0	2.8
Career 2006-17		513	305	23.5	.395	.356	.805	1.2	2.5	0.5	0.1	7.3

=== Playoffs ===
Year	Team	GP	GS	MPG	FG%	3P%	FT%	RPG	APG	SPG	BPG	PPG
2011-12	Sendai	2		7.0	.143	.000	.000	0.0	0.0	0.0	0.0	1.0
2015-16	Akita	6	0	20.17	.361	.375	.833	1.17	2.83	0.33	0.17	6.17
2016-17	Akita	3	0		.333	.000	.000	0.33	0.66	0.33	0	0.7

== Trivia ==
- He loves to read Yoshihiro Takahashi's Ginga: Nagareboshi Gin manga.

== Personal ==
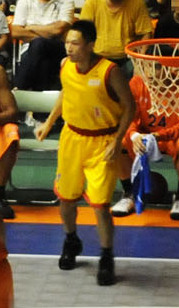
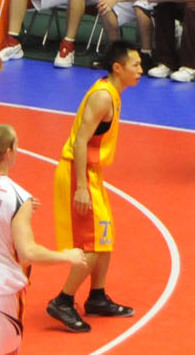
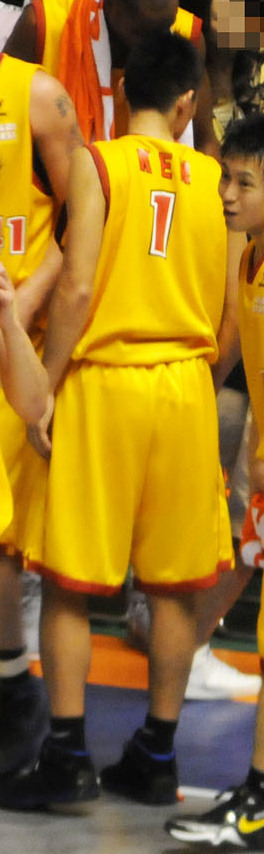

His father Norito Takahashi runs a restaurant in Okubo, Katagami where Kenichi's awards, pictures and uniforms are displayed.
