= Keishi Handa =

Japanese basketball player

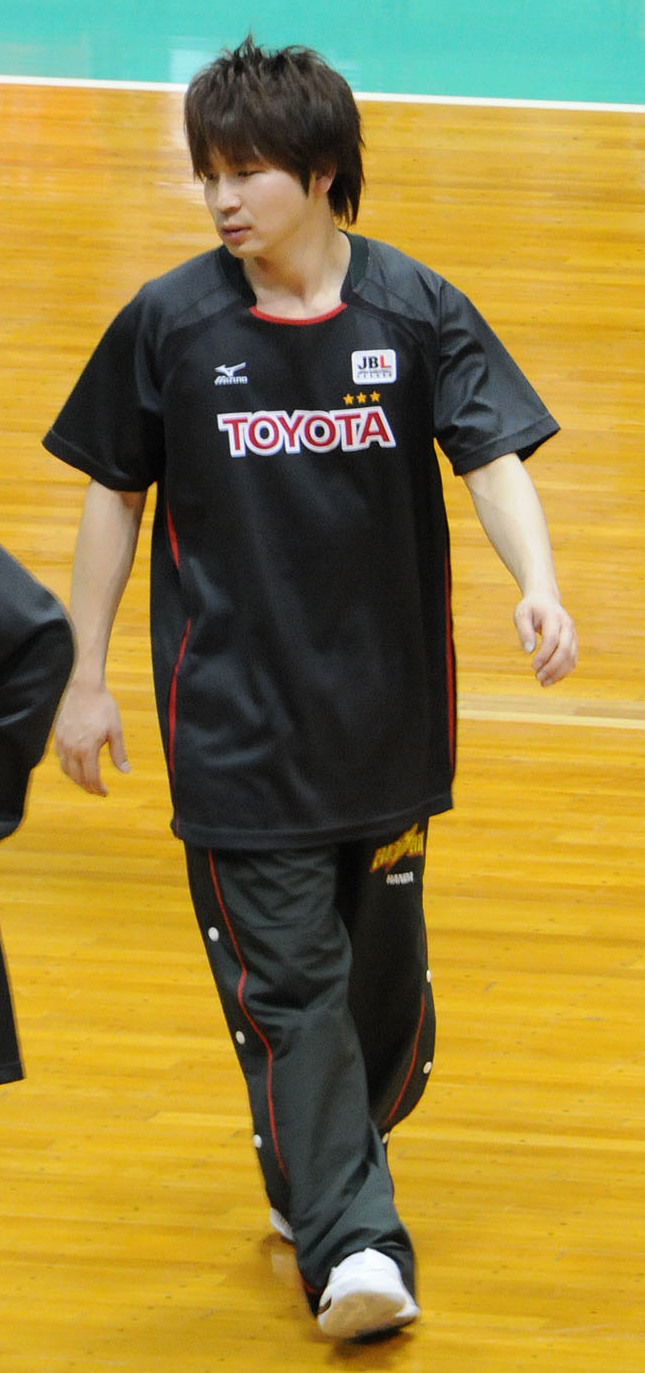

Personal information
- Born: July 1, 1977 (age 49) Omonogawa, Akita
- Listed height: 5 ft 8 in (1.73 m)
- Listed weight: 157 lb (71 kg)

Career information
- High school: Noshiro Technical (Noshiro, Akita)
- College: Senshu University

Career history
- 2000-2004: Hitachi SunRockers
- 2004-2009: Toyota Alvark

Career highlights
- 3x Japanese champions
Medals
Representing Japan
William Jones Cup
Bronze medal – third place	2002 Taipei	Team

Keishi Handa (半田圭史, Handa Keishi; born July 1, 1977) is a former basketball player for Hitachi SunRockers and Toyota Alvark in Japan.
