= Daigo Station (Akita) =

Railway station in Yokote, Akita Prefecture, Japan

Daigo Station 醍醐駅
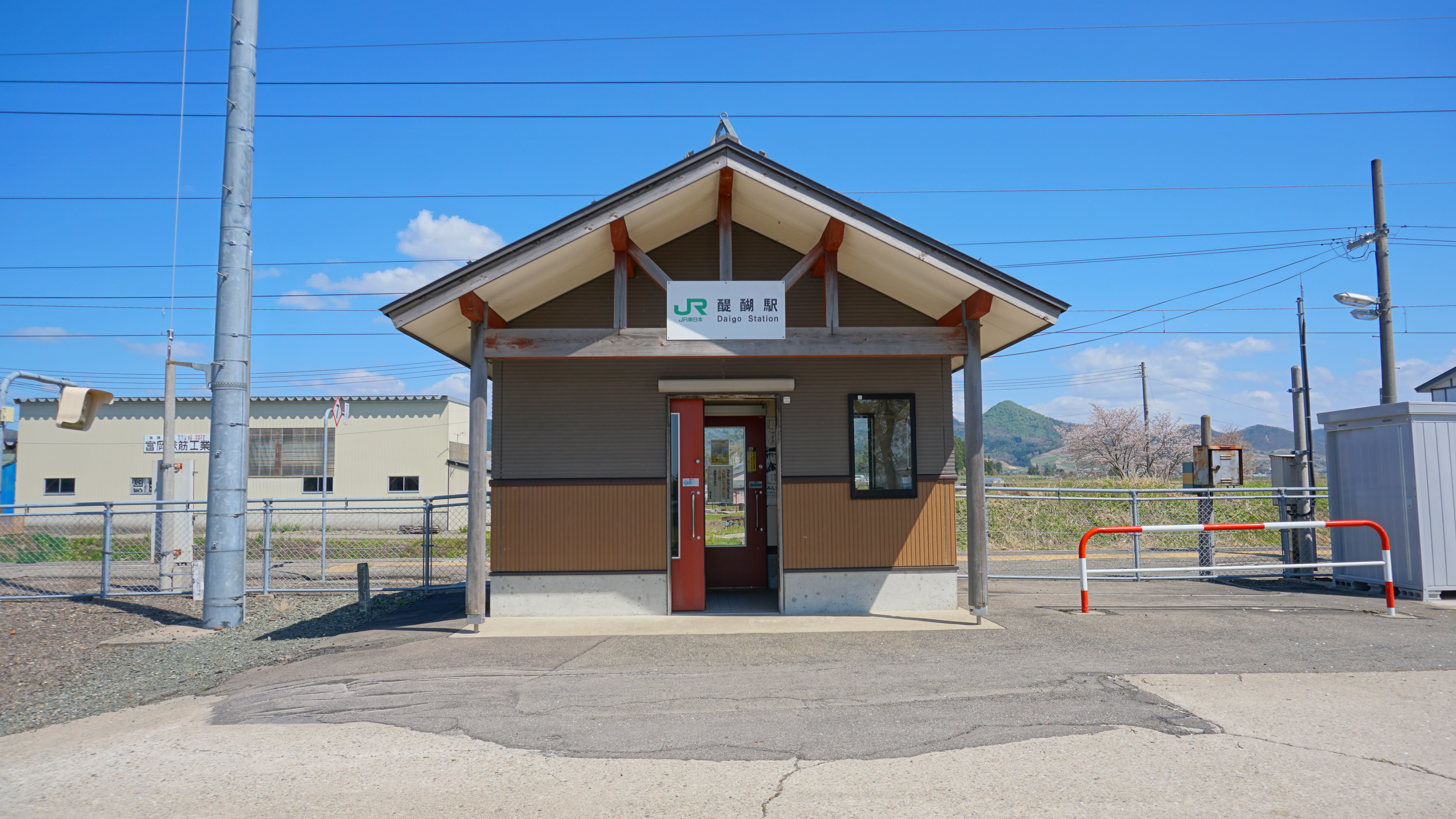
- Daigo Station in May 2019

General information
- Location: Tamoden-8 Hirakamachi Daigo, Yokote-shi, Akita-ken 013-0102; Japan
- Coordinates: 39°14′58.5″N 140°32′19.4″E
- Operator: JR East
- Line: ■ Ōu Main Line
- Distance: 221.2 kilometers from Fukushima
- Platforms: 1 side platform

Other information
- Status: Unstaffed
- Website: Official website

History
- Opened: November 15, 1951

Services
Preceding station	JR East	Following station
Jūmonji towards Shinjō	Ōu Main Line Local	Yanagita towards Aomori
Location
- Location within Akita Prefecture Location within Japan

Daigo Station (醍醐駅, Daigo-eki) is a railway station on the Ōu Main Line in the city of Yokote, Akita Prefecture, Japan, operated by JR East.

== Lines ==
Daigo Station is served by the Ōu Main Line, and is located 221.2 km from the terminus of the line at Fukushima Station.

== Station layout ==
The station consists of a single side platform serving a single bi-directional track. The station is unattended.

== History ==
Daigo Station opened on November 15, 1951 as a station on the Japan National Railways (JNR). The station was absorbed into the JR East network upon the privatization of the JNR on April 1, 1987. A new station building was completed in November 2006.

== Surrounding area ==
- National Route 13

== See also ==
- List of railway stations in Japan
