= Hiraka District, Akita =

Former district in Akita prefecture, Japan

Coordinates: 39°18′41″N 140°33′12″E

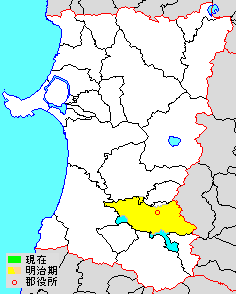
Location of former Hiraka District in Akita Prefecture

Hiraka (平鹿郡, Hiraka-gun) was a rural district located in southern Akita, Japan. On 1 October 2005, its remaining components- the towns of Hiraka, Jūmonji, Masuda, Omonogawa, Ōmori; and the villages of Sannai and Taiyū- merged into the city of Yokote, upon which Hiraka District was dissolved and ceased to exist as an administrative unit.

== History ==
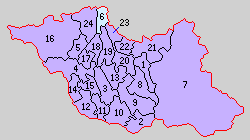
Historic Hiraka District – 1.Yokote 2.Masuda 3.Asamai 4.Numadate 5. Ōmori 6.Kakumagawa 7.Sannai 8.Sakae 9.Daigo 10.Jūmonji 11.Ueda 12.Mutsuai 13.Yoshida 14.Fukushi 15.Satomi 16.Yazawagi 17.Tateai 18.Age 19.Tanemori 20.Asahi 21.Asakura 22.Sakemachi 23.Kurokawa 24.Kawanishi Purple：Yokote City Light Blue：Daisen City

The area of Hiraka Distinct was formerly part of Dewa Province, which was divided into the provinces of Ugo Province and Uzen Province following the Meiji restoration on 19 January 1869, with the area of Hiraka becoming part of Ugo Province. At the time, the area consisted of one town (Yokote) and 113 villages all of which were formerly under the control of Kubota Domain. Akita Prefecture was founded on 13 December 1871.

With the establishment of the municipality system on 1 April 1889, Hiraka District, with one town (Yokote) and 23 villages was established. Masuda and Asamai were raised to town status in 1895, followed by Kakumagawa in 1896, and Numadate and Ōmori in 1901 and Jūmonji in 1922. The city of Yokote was established on 1 April 1951, Numadate became Omonogawa in 1956, and Kakumagawa was merged into what later became the city of Daisen the same year. Asamai became Hiraka in 1956.

On 1 October 2005, the towns of Hiraka, Jūmonji, Masuda, Omonogawa, Ōmori, and the villages of Sannai, and Taiyū merged into the city of Yokote. Hiraka District was dissolved as a result.
