= Sun Sportsland Kyowa Gymnasium =

Indoor Sport Arena

Sun Sportsland Kyowa Gymnasium サンスポーツランド協和体育館
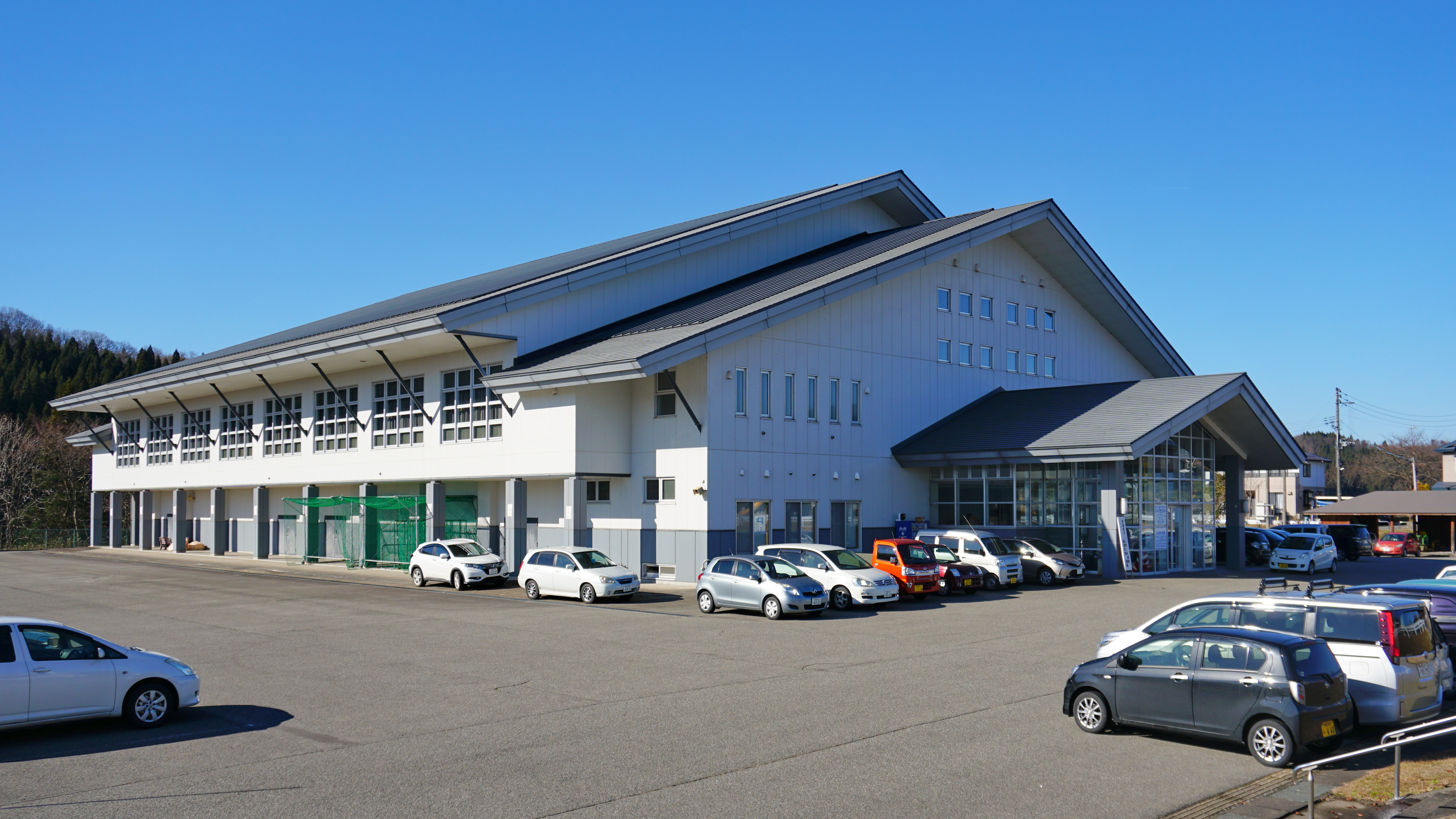

- Location within Akita Prefecture Location within Japan
- Interactive map of Sun Sportsland Kyowa Gymnasium サンスポーツランド協和体育館
- Full name: Daisen Municipal Sun Sportsland Kyowa Gymnasium
- Location: Aza Obukuro 2-2, Kyowafunaoka Daisen City, Akita Prefecture
- Coordinates: (39°37′19.7″N 140°18′50″E)
- Owner: City of Daisen
- Operator: City of Daisen
- Parking: 30 spaces

Sun Sportsland Kyowa Gymnasium (サンスポーツランド協和体育館) is an indoor sporting arena located in Kyowa, Daisen, Akita, Japan. It hosts indoor sporting events such as basketball, volleyball and table tennis. The Sun Sportsland also has a baseball park, and it is adjacent to the Kyowa Civic Center Wapia.

== Facilities ==
- Main arena
- Running course
- Training space
