= Yokote =

Yokote 横手市
- City
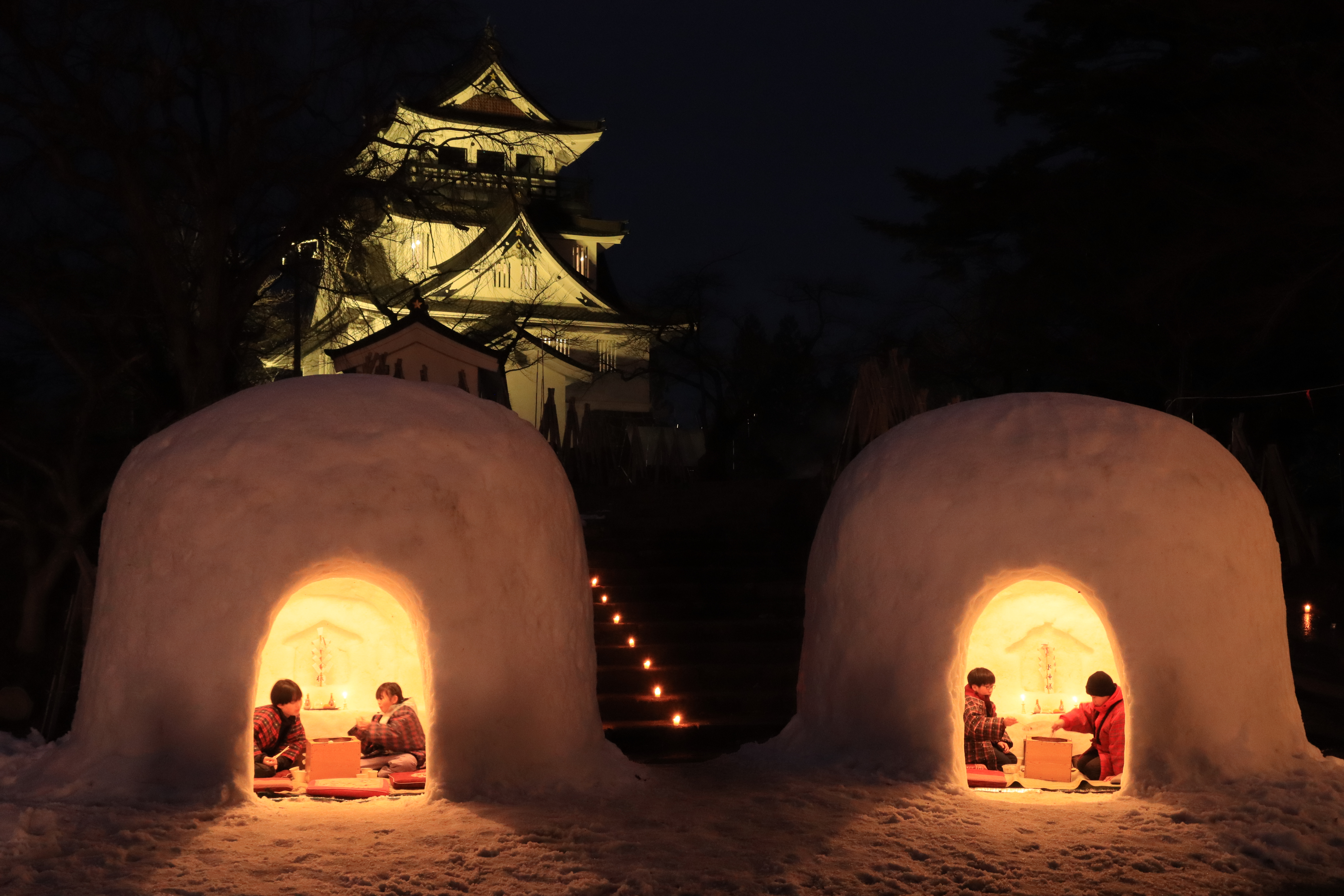
- Kamakura Snow Stature in Yokote

- Flag Seal
- Location of Yokote in Akita Prefecture

- Coordinates: 39°18′40.8″N 140°33′11.8″E
- Country: Japan
- Region: Tōhoku
- Prefecture: Akita

Government
  - Mayor: Dai Takahashi (from October 2013)

Area
  - Total: 692.80 km^{2} (267.49 sq mi)

Population (April 30, 2024)
  - Total: 81,617
  - Density: 117.81/km^{2} (305.12/sq mi)
- Time zone: UTC+9 (Japan Standard Time)
- Phone number: 0182-35-2111
- Address: 8-2 Chuo-machi, Yokote-shi, Akita-ken 013-8601
- Climate: Cfa/Dfa
- Website: Official website
- Symbols
- Bird: Swan
- Flower: Sakura
- Tree: Apple

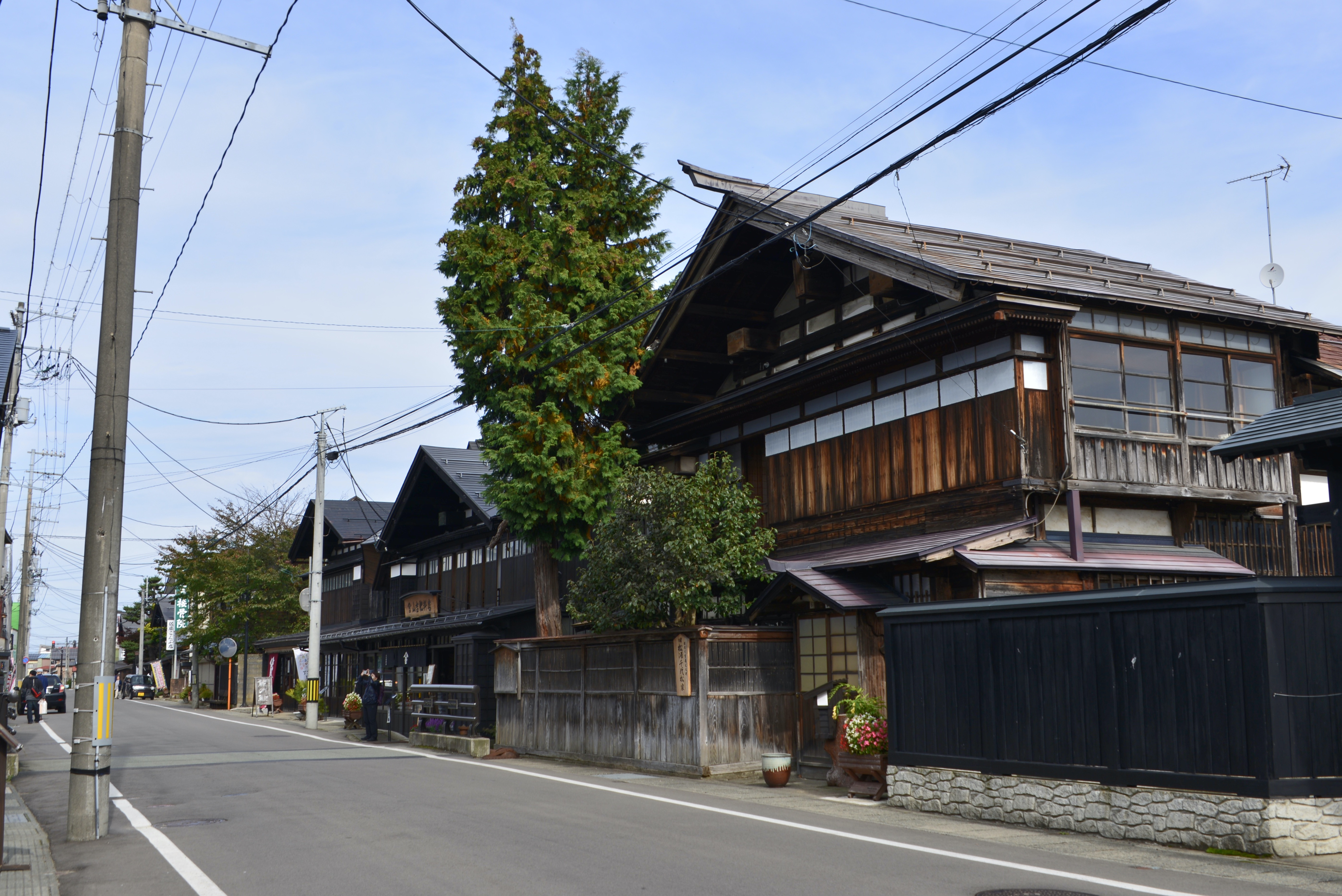
Masuda streets

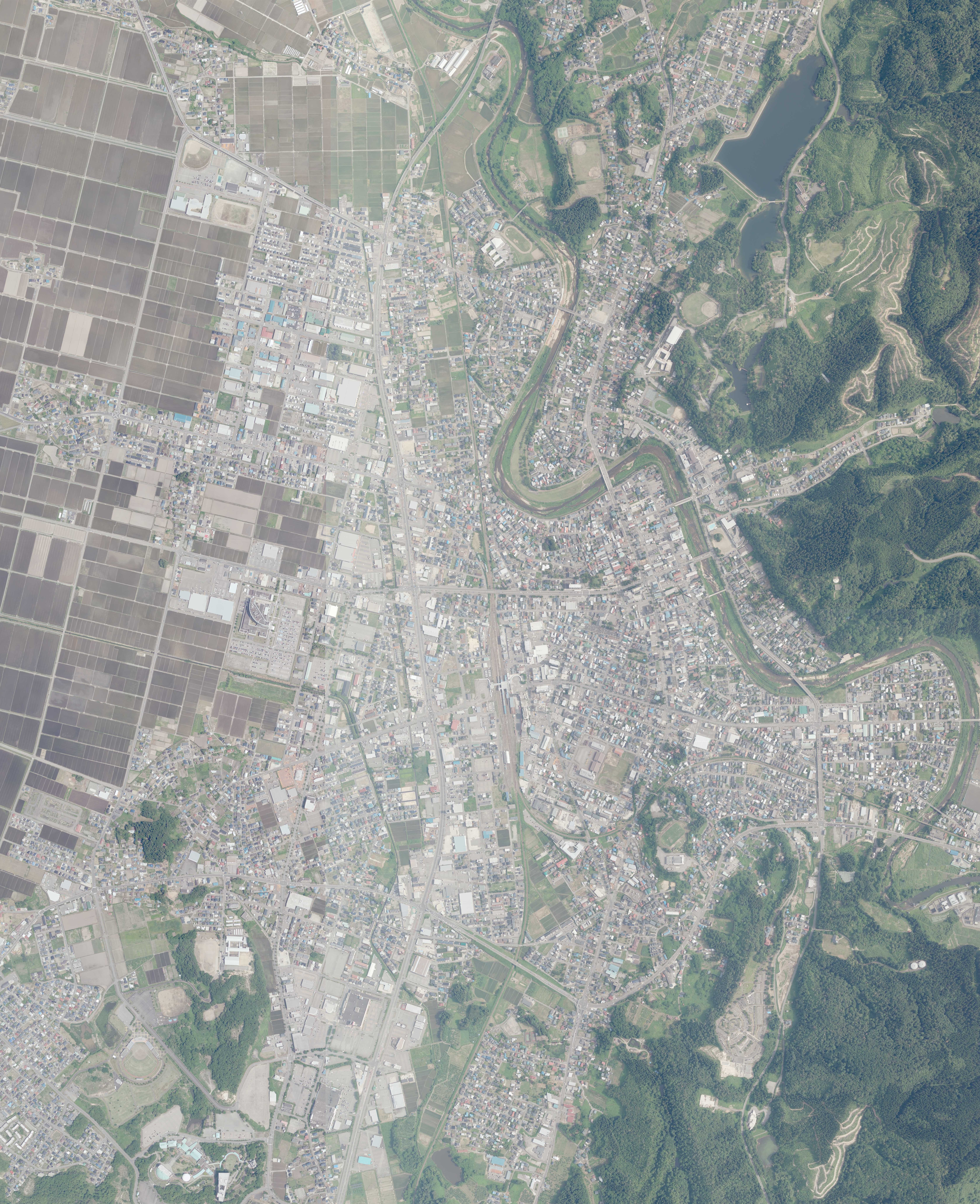
Aerial photograph of Yokote city center (2023)

Yokote (横手市, Yokote-shi) is a city located in Akita Prefecture, Japan. As of 30 April 2024, the city had an estimated population of 81,617 in 33,876 households, and a population density of 120 persons per km². The total area of the city is 692.80 km^{2} (267.49 sq mi).

== Geography ==
Yokote is located in southeast corner of Akita Prefecture in the center of the Yokote Basin, the Yokote River, which flows from the Ōu Mountains to the east, flows through the urban area. It is located about 70 kilometers away from the prefectural capital at Akita city. The city has an area of about 45 kilometers east-west and about 35 kilometers north-south.

=== Neighboring municipalities ===
Akita Prefecture

- Daisen
- Higashinaruse
- Misato
- Ugo
- Yurihonjō
- Yuzawa

Iwate Prefecture

- Nishiwaga

== Climate ==
Yokote has a Humid continental climate (Köppen climate classification Dfa/Cfa) with large seasonal temperature differences, with warm to hot (and often humid) summers and cold (sometimes severely cold) winters. Precipitation is significant throughout the year, but is heaviest from August to October. The average annual temperature in Yokote is 11.2 °C (52.2 °F). The average annual rainfall is 1,737.3 mm (68.40 in) with December as the wettest month. The temperatures are highest on average in August, at around 24.7 °C (76.5 °F), and lowest in January, at around −1.3 °C (29.7 °F).

Climate data for Yokote (elevation 59 m, 1991–2020 normals, extremes 1976–present)
Month	Jan	Feb	Mar	Apr	May	Jun	Jul	Aug	Sep	Oct	Nov	Dec	Year
Record high °C (°F)	11.3 (52.3)	19.9 (67.8)	22.5 (72.5)	31.6 (88.9)	33.7 (92.7)	35.4 (95.7)	38.1 (100.6)	39.2 (102.6)	36.7 (98.1)	31.8 (89.2)	25.9 (78.6)	18.4 (65.1)	39.2 (102.6)
Mean daily maximum °C (°F)	1.4 (34.5)	2.6 (36.7)	6.9 (44.4)	15.0 (59.0)	21.3 (70.3)	25.2 (77.4)	28.3 (82.9)	30.0 (86.0)	25.7 (78.3)	19.0 (66.2)	11.5 (52.7)	4.2 (39.6)	15.9 (60.6)
Daily mean °C (°F)	−1.3 (29.7)	−0.8 (30.6)	2.4 (36.3)	8.9 (48.0)	15.2 (59.4)	19.7 (67.5)	23.5 (74.3)	24.7 (76.5)	20.4 (68.7)	13.6 (56.5)	6.9 (44.4)	1.1 (34.0)	11.2 (52.2)
Mean daily minimum °C (°F)	−4.3 (24.3)	−4.1 (24.6)	−1.5 (29.3)	3.6 (38.5)	9.9 (49.8)	15.1 (59.2)	19.7 (67.5)	20.6 (69.1)	16.1 (61.0)	9.1 (48.4)	2.9 (37.2)	−1.8 (28.8)	7.1 (44.8)
Record low °C (°F)	−15.5 (4.1)	−16.4 (2.5)	−11.5 (11.3)	−6.5 (20.3)	−0.2 (31.6)	5.7 (42.3)	9.3 (48.7)	11.2 (52.2)	4.3 (39.7)	0.0 (32.0)	−10.0 (14.0)	−15.9 (3.4)	−16.4 (2.5)
Average precipitation mm (inches)	184.1 (7.25)	119.5 (4.70)	95.4 (3.76)	85.3 (3.36)	100.1 (3.94)	113.8 (4.48)	194.4 (7.65)	183.6 (7.23)	136.6 (5.38)	144.6 (5.69)	174.1 (6.85)	206.0 (8.11)	1,737.3 (68.40)
Average snowfall cm (inches)	276 (109)	202 (80)	106 (42)	6 (2.4)	0 (0)	0 (0)	0 (0)	0 (0)	0 (0)	0 (0)	23 (9.1)	186 (73)	793 (312)
Average precipitation days (≥ 1.0 mm)	24.1	20.1	17.3	12.7	12.0	10.5	13.2	11.8	12.5	14.4	19.0	23.7	191.3
Mean monthly sunshine hours	32.0	52.6	100.7	157.0	185.8	172.0	146.0	177.7	144.1	130.8	83.5	38.3	1,416.4
Source: Japan Meteorological Agency (1991–2020 normals, extremes 1976–present)

== Demographics ==
Per Japanese census data, the population of Yokote has been in decline for the past 70 years.

Historical population
Year	Pop.	±% p.a.
1950	148,075	—
1960	140,675	−0.51%
1970	124,160	−1.24%
1980	120,479	−0.30%
1990	115,761	−0.40%
2000	109,004	−0.60%
2010	98,378	−1.02%
2020	85,555	−1.39%

== History ==
The area of present-day Yokote was part of ancient Dewa Province and was the homeland of the Kiyohara clan of the Heian period Gosannen War. At the end of the Sengoku period, the area came under the control of the Onodera clan, who ruled from Yokote Castle. However, the Onodera sided against Tokugawa Ieyasu at the Battle of Sekigahara and the area came under the control of the Satake clan, who had been relocated to Kubota Domain from their former holdings in Hitachi Province. Kubota Domain was uncommon in that it contained more than one castle, despite the Tokugawa shogunate's "one castle per domain" rule, and Yokote remained a secondary castle town under the Kubota clan until the Meiji restoration.

After the start of the Meiji period, the area became part of Hiraka District, Akita Prefecture in 1878, with one town and 23 villages. The modern city of Yokote was founded on April 1, 1951.

On October 1, 2005, the towns of Hiraka, Jūmonji, Masuda, Omonogawa and Ōmori, and the villages of Sannai, and Taiyū (all from Hiraka District) were merged into Yokote, which now occupies all of former Hiraka District, plus the villages of Meiji and Nishinarusei (formerly from Ogachi District), and the village of Kanazawa (formerly from Senboku District).

== Government ==
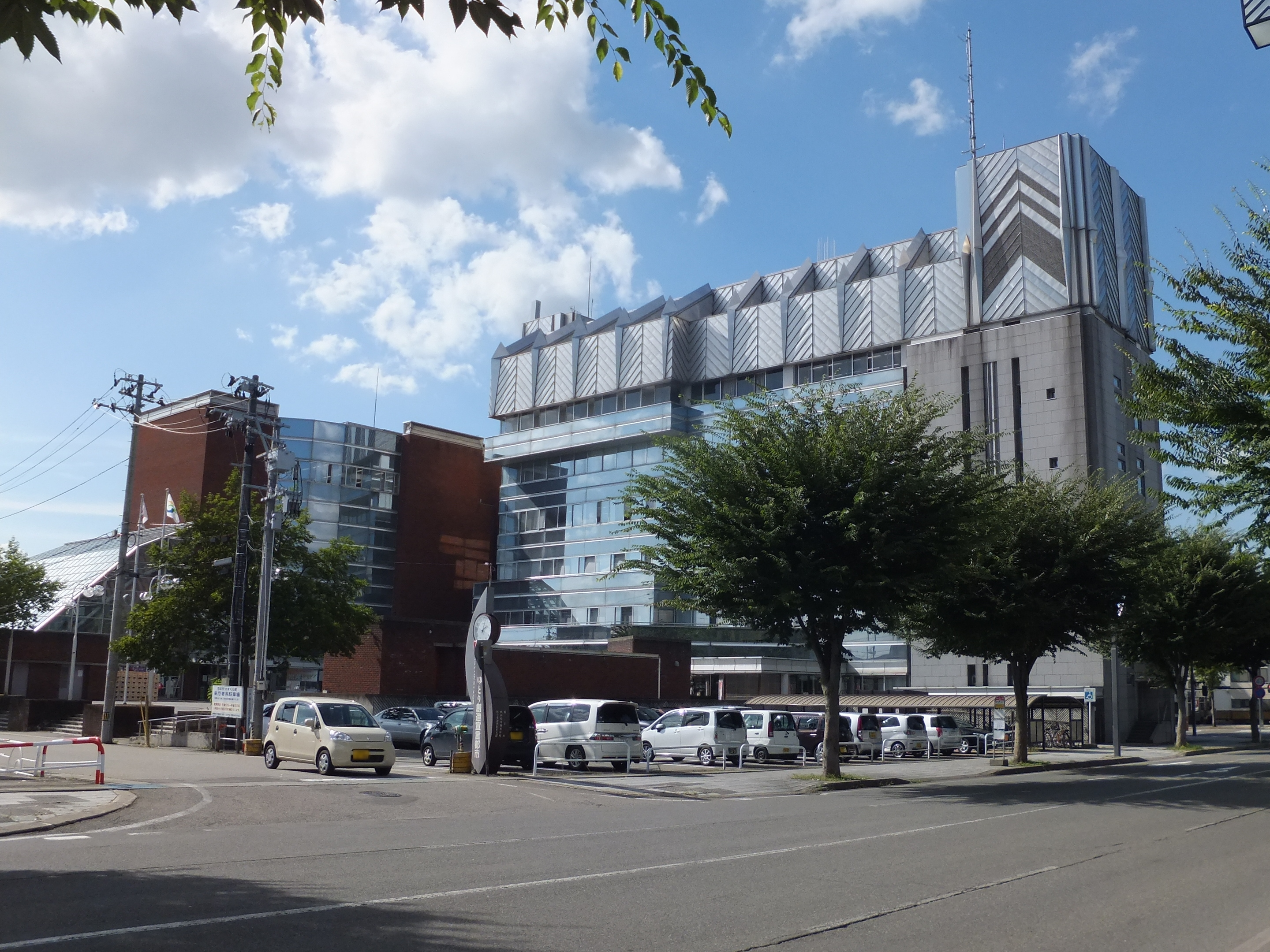
Yokote City Hall Main Office

Yokote has a mayor-council form of government with a directly elected mayor and a unicameral city legislature of 25 members. The city contributes four members to the Akita Prefectural Assembly. In terms of national politics, the city is part of the Akita 3rd District of the lower house of the Diet of Japan.

== Economy ==
The economy of Yokote is based on agriculture.

== Education ==
Yokote has fourteen public elementary schools and six public middle schools operated by the city government and five public high schools operated by the Akita Prefectural Board of Education. The prefecture also operates one combined middle/high school and one special education school for the handicapped.

== Transportation ==
=== Railway ===
East Japan Railway Company - Ōu Main Line

- Jūmonji - Daigo - Yanagita - Yokote

East Japan Railway Company - Kitakami Line

- Kurosawa - Komatsukawa - Ainono - Yokote

=== Highway ===
- Tōhoku-Chūō Expressway
- Akita Expressway
- National Route 13
- National Route 107
- National Route 342
- National Route 397

=== Air ===
The nearest airport is Akita Airport which is located approximately 54.1 km (34 mi) north west of Yokote.

== Local attractions ==
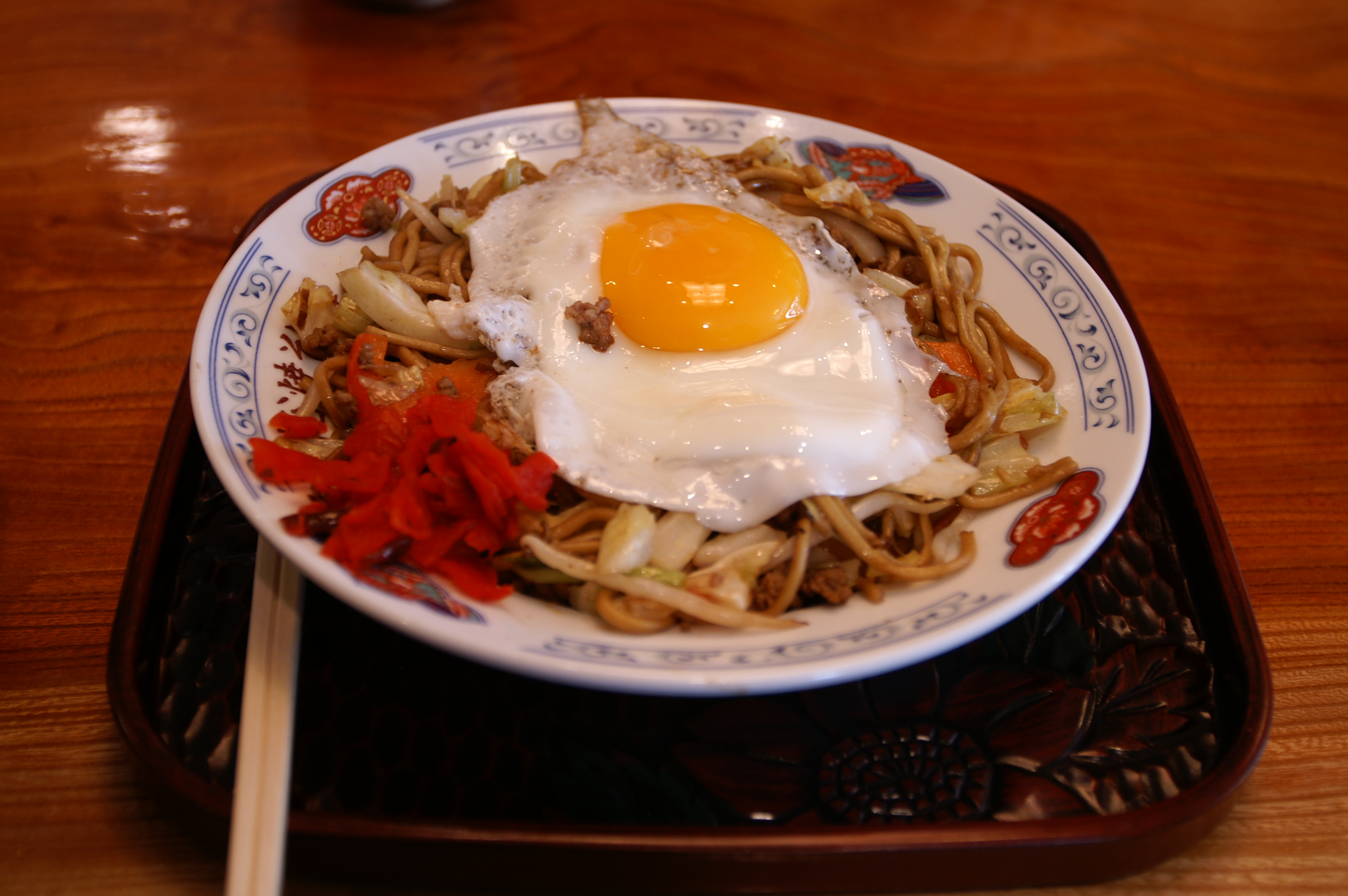
Yokote Yakisoba

- Akita Museum of Modern Art

=== Kamakura Festival ===
Yokote is known for its Kamakura Festival, a midwinter festival in which igloo-like snow houses are made throughout the town. It is held in the days leading to the Bonden Festival (mid February) and its location is focused around the city hall area. Children and others sit in the kamakura and serve amazake and mochi to visitors. In addition, several stalls are situated around town serving other types of typical Japanese festival food, including the town's own meibutsu "Yokote yakisoba".

An altar for the water deity is carved into the rear of the room inside each kamakura, where people pray for abundant harvests, the safety of their family members, protection against fire and for academic success. In addition to the large igloos, there are mini-kamakura which are spread throughout the city. There are candles inside the tiny snow domes. Some of the regular kamakura and the mini-kamakura are sponsored by local businesses and can sometimes be an advertisement for a product, such as a cell phone. The kamakura can be experienced year round in a building adjacent to Yokote City Hall called the Kamakura-kan. Inside, there are a few kamakura kept at a temperature of 10 °C (50 °F) and are open to visitors.

== International relations ==
=== Sister cities ===
Yokote is twinned with:

- Atsugi, Kanagawa, Japan, since May 24, 1985
- Naka, Ibaraki, Japan, since October 22, 2004

== Notable people from Yokote ==
- Keishi Handa, basketball player
- Makoto Hasegawa, basketball head coach
- Kiyomi Sato, basketball head coach
- Tatsuzō Ishikawa, author
- Kiyonomori Masao, sumo wrestler
- Yasushi Sasaki, movie director.
- Sayuri Sugawara, musician
- Yu Takahashi, musician
- Manabu Terata, politician
- Yoshinori Tomura, general
- Daisuke Usami, volleyball player
- Mitsu Dan, actress
- Takao Yaguchi, manga artist
