= Nices Arena =

Multi-use indoor arena in Yurihonjo, Akita, Japan

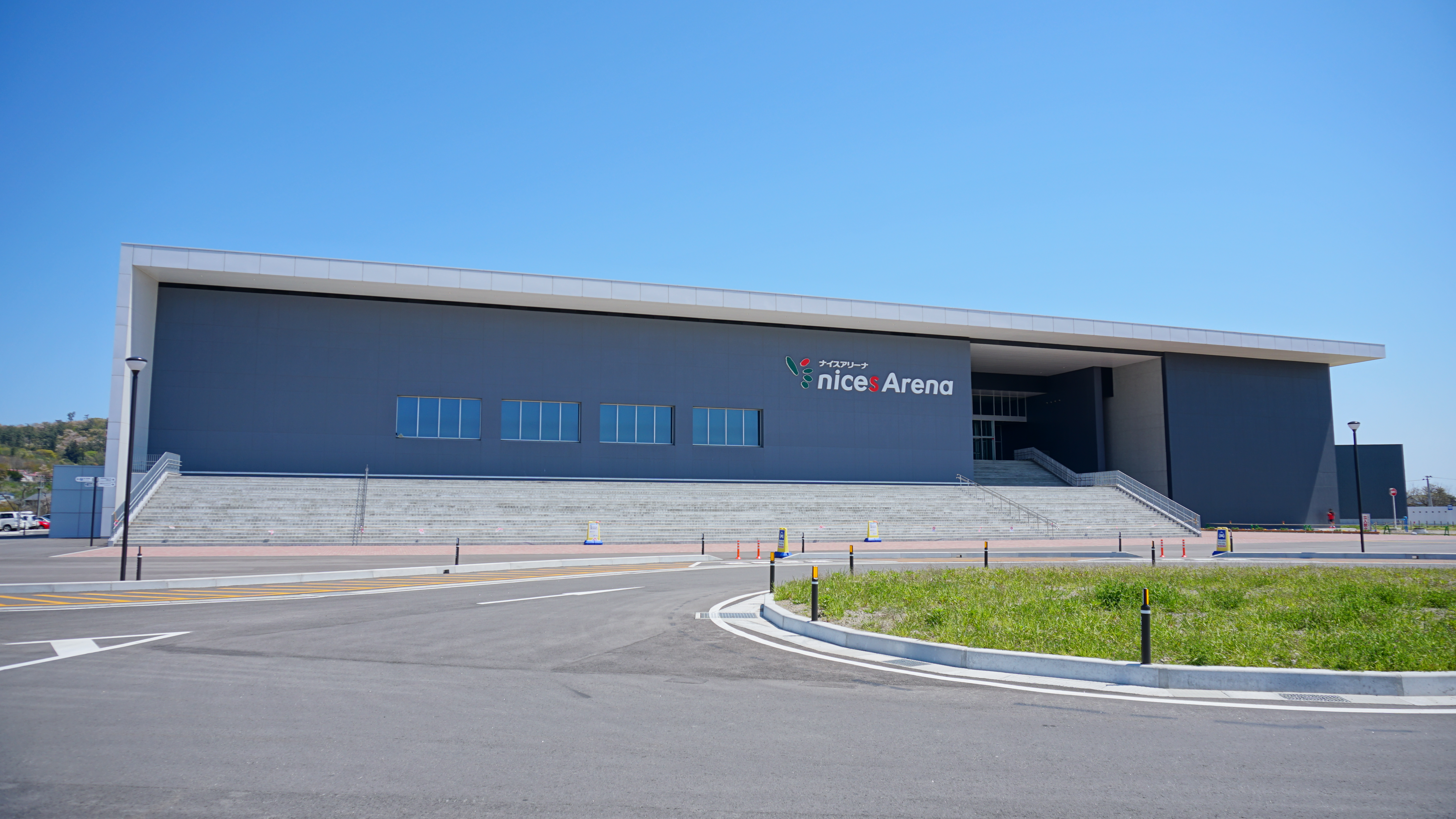
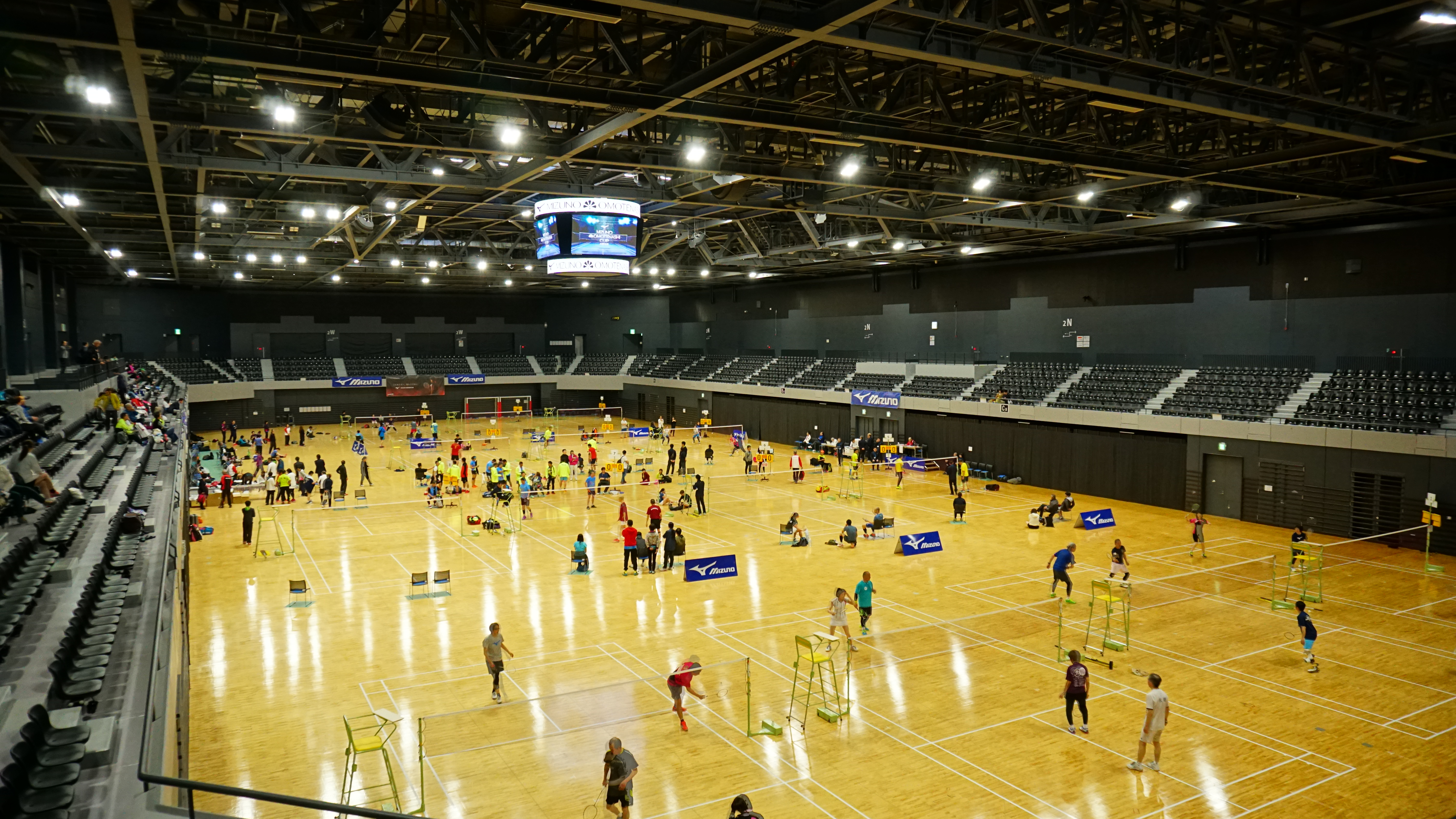

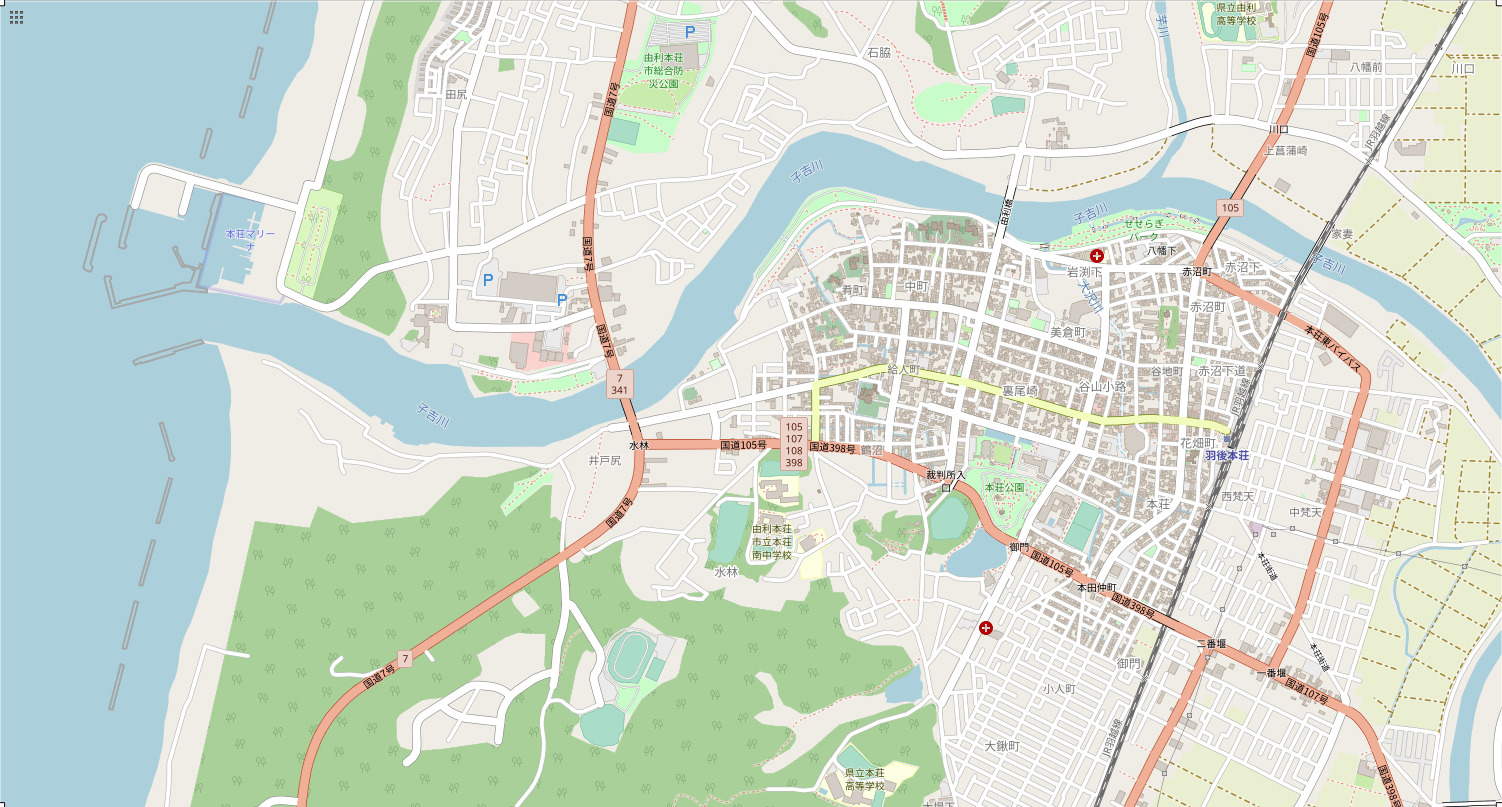
- Location within Honjo, Akita Location within Akita Prefecture Location within Japan
- Interactive map of Nices Arena
- Full name: Yurihonjo General Disaster Prevention Park
- Location: 18 Tajirino, Ishiwaki, Yurihonjo, Japan
- Coordinates: 39°23′56.3″N 140°02′00.4″E
- Owner: The City of Yurihonjo
- Operator: Mizuno Sports Service
- Capacity: Concert:5,000; Basketball:4,000
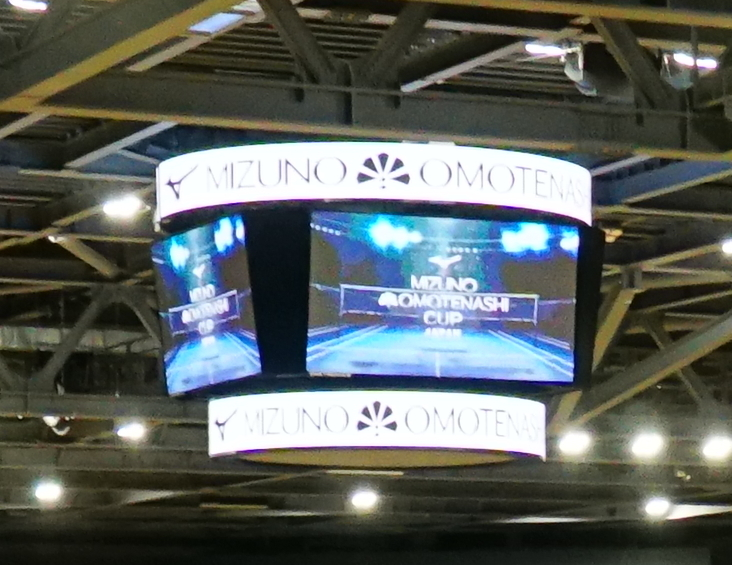
- Scoreboard: Daktronics LED centerhung scoreboard
- Field size: 16,967 sqm
- Public transit: Japan Railway Ugo-Honjō Station
- Parking: 1,000 spaces

Construction
- Groundbreaking: March 18, 2016
- Opened: October 1, 2018
- Cost: JPY10.8 billion
- Architect: Azusa Sekkei
- Main contractor: Sato Kogyo

Tenants
- Prestige International Aranmare Akita; Akita Northern Happinets

Website
- https://sports-service.mizuno.jp/facilities/yurihonjo/

Nices Arena (ナイスアリーナ) is a multi-use indoor arena in Yurihonjo, Akita. Groundbreaking and construction began on March 18, 2016, and opened in October 2018. The arena's parking lot can hold 1,000 cars. Yurihonjo city introduced the Daktronics high-definition LED centerhung display for the second time in the prefecture. "EXPERIENCE THE DAKTRONICS DIFFERENCE" was the very first message on this HD video set. There is no ribbon displays and "see through" shot clocks. It is named after the supermarket Nices based in Akita city. The store pays JPY3.1 million annually for the naming rights.

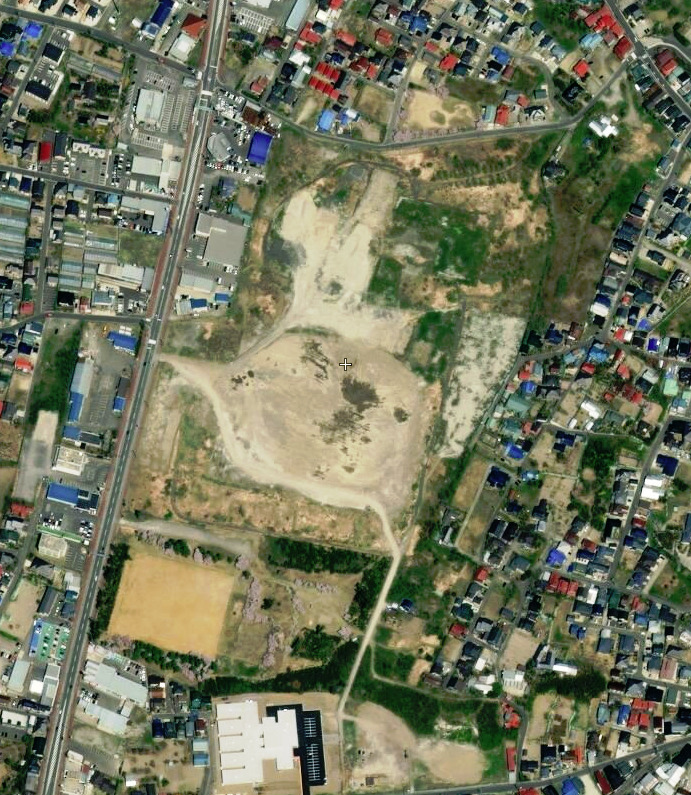
Building site in 2014

== Facilities ==
- Main arena (91m x 38m, 3,458 square metres)
- Sub-arena (32m x 20m, 640 square metres)
- Kendo area
- Judo area
- Training room
- Fitness studio
- Changing rooms
- Shower room
- Conference rooms

== Additional seats ==
It is announced that the city will add 480 new seats in 2020. The budget is 100 million yen.

== Attendance records ==
The largest crowd to ever gather at the Nices Arena was on December 7, 2019, for Badminton S/J League games, with a reported attendance of 4,100. The record for a basketball game is 3,825, set on March 3, 2019, when the Osaka Evessa defeated the Happinets 88–73.

== Access ==
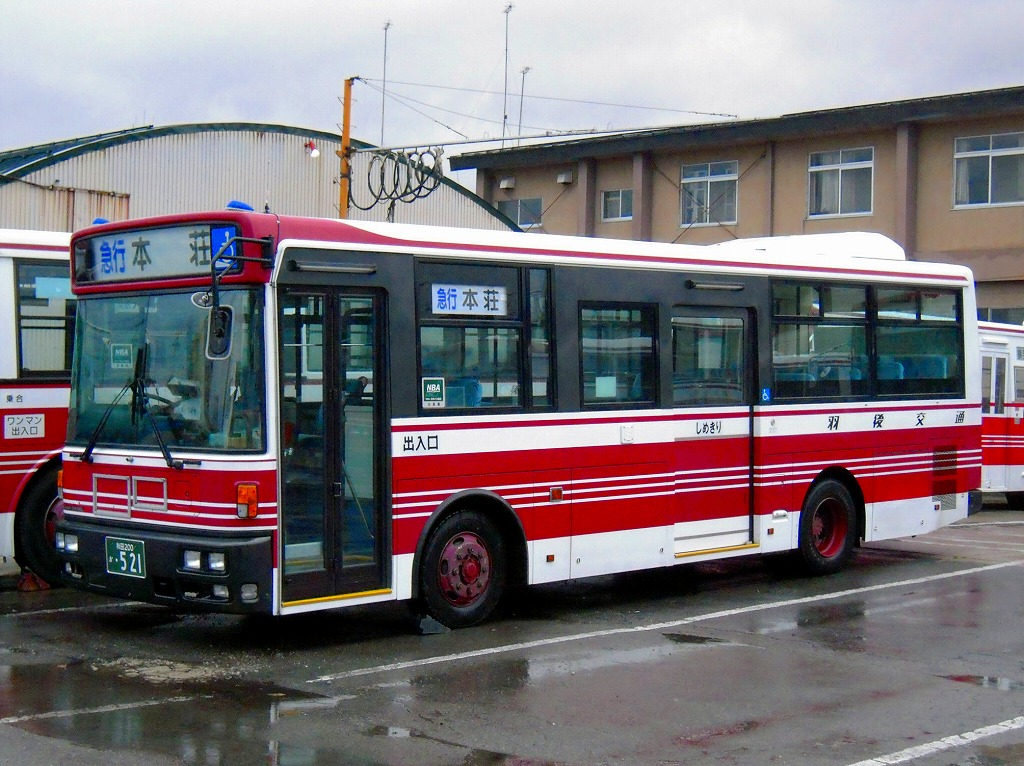
Ugo Kotsu Express

- From Ugo-Honjō Station: Shinai-sen of Ugo Kotsu Bus. Get off at Nice Arena.
- From Akita Station: Express Akita-Honjo sen of Ugo Kotsu Bus . Get off at Hello Work Honjo-mae.
