= Hiraka, Akita =

Dissolved municipality in Akita prefecture, Japan

Hiraka (平鹿町, Hiraka-machi) was a town located in Hiraka District, Akita Prefecture, Japan.

In 2003, the town had an estimated population of 14,394 and a density of 227.32 persons per km^{2}. The total area was 63.32 km^{2}.

On October 1, 2005, Hiraka, along with the towns of Jūmonji, Masuda, Omonogawa and Ōmori; and the villages of Sannai and Taiyū (all from Hiraka District), was merged into the expanded city of Yokote.
