= Misato General Gymnasium Lirios =

Indoor sporting arena in Misato, Akita, Japan

Misato General Gymnasium Lirios 美郷町総合体育館リリオス
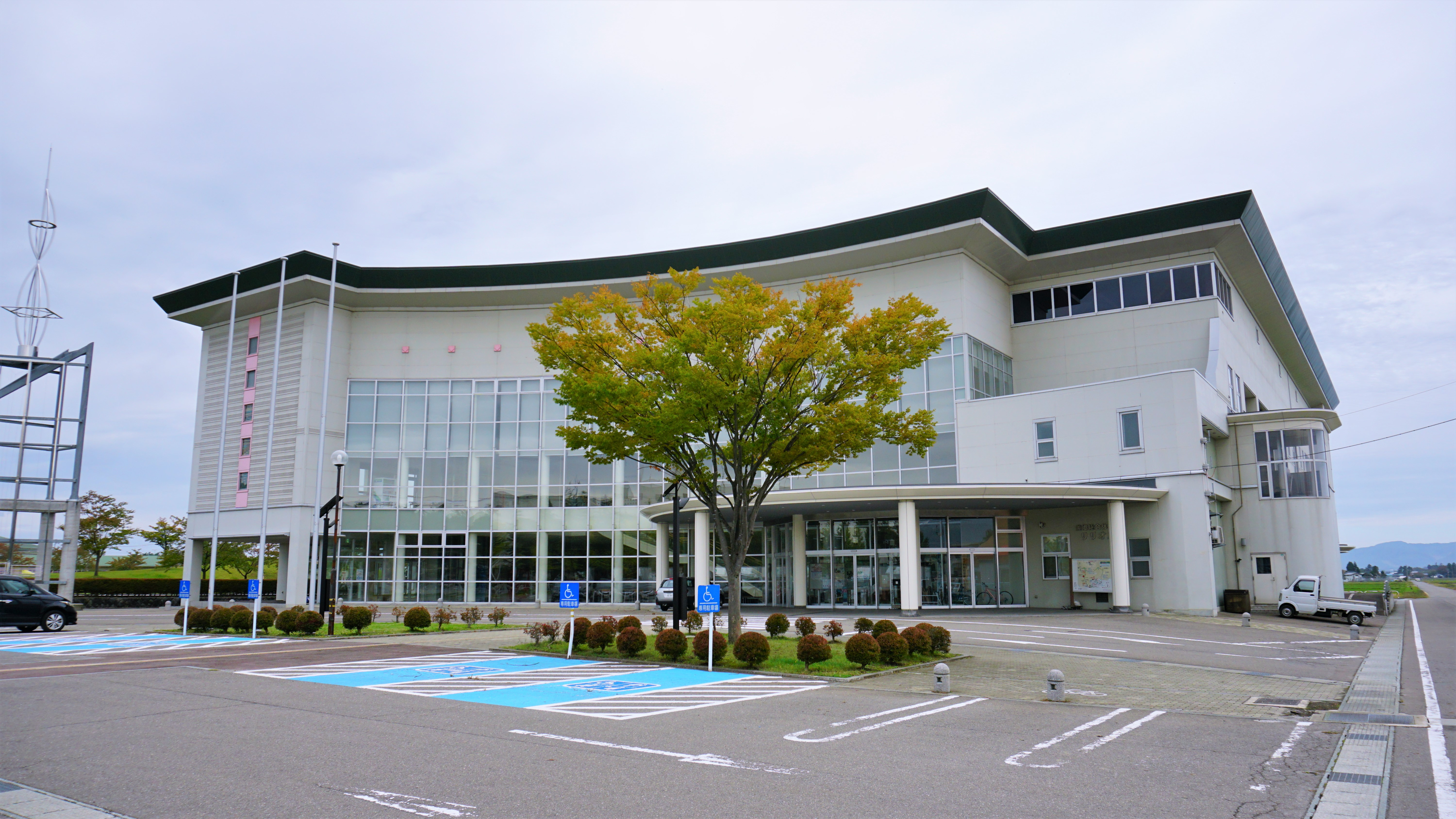

- Location within Akita Prefecture Location within Japan
- Interactive map of Misato General Gymnasium Lirios 美郷町総合体育館リリオス
- Full name: Misato Town General Gymnasium Lirios
- Location: 18-1, Aza Nukabuchi, Iizume Misato Town, Akita Prefecture
- Coordinates: (39°23′18″N 140°31′51.7″E)
- Owner: Town of Misato
- Operator: Town of Misato
- Parking: 250 spaces

Misato Town General Gymnasium Lirios (美郷町総合体育館リリオス) is an indoor sporting arena located in Misato, Akita, Japan that hosts indoor sporting events such as basketball, volleyball and table tennis. It hosted the National Sports Festival of Japan badminton games in 2007.

Misato Town Minami Gymnasium (美郷町南体育館) is located within walking distance of Lirios.

== Facilities ==
- Main arena -
- Conference room
- Shower rooms
- Fitness room

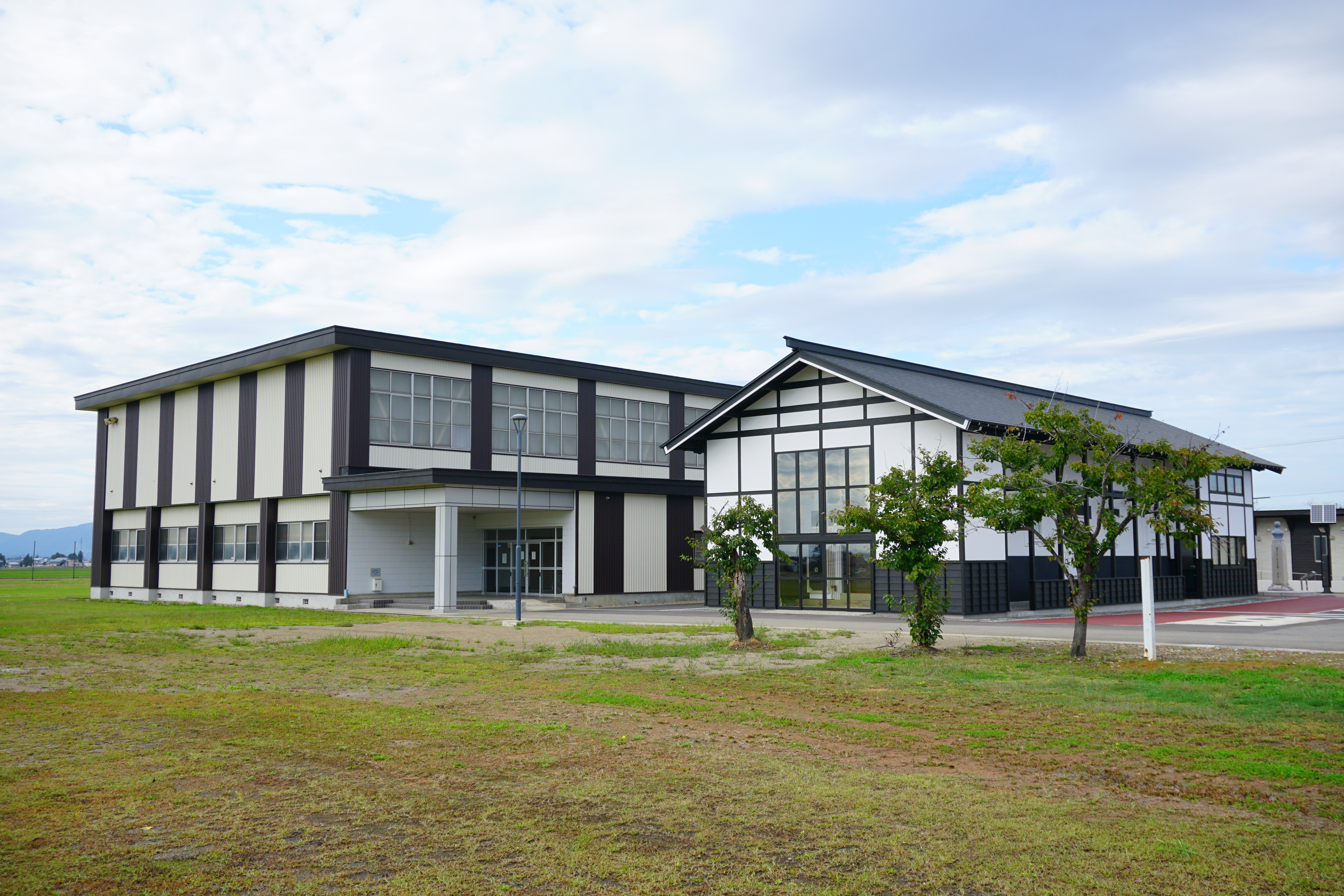
Wakuasu lodging facilities
