= Omonogawa, Akita =

Omonogawa 雄物川町
- Former settlement
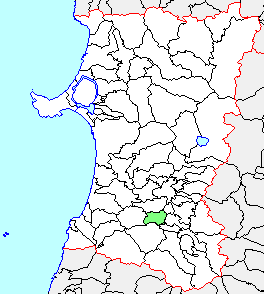
- Interactive map of Omonogawa
- Country: Japan
- Prefecture: Akita
- District: Hiraka

Omonogawa (雄物川町, Omonogawa-machi) was a town located in Hiraka District, Akita Prefecture, Japan.

== Population ==
In 2003, the town had an estimated population of 10,829 and a density of 147.13 persons per km^{2}. The total area was 73.60 km^{2}.

== Merge ==
On October 1, 2005, Omonogawa, along with the towns of Hiraka, Jūmonji, Masuda and Ōmori; and the villages of Sannai and Taiyū (all from Hiraka District), was merged into the expanded city of Yokote.
