= Eastern margin of the Sea of Japan =

Plate boundary between the Amurian and Okhotsk plates in East Asia

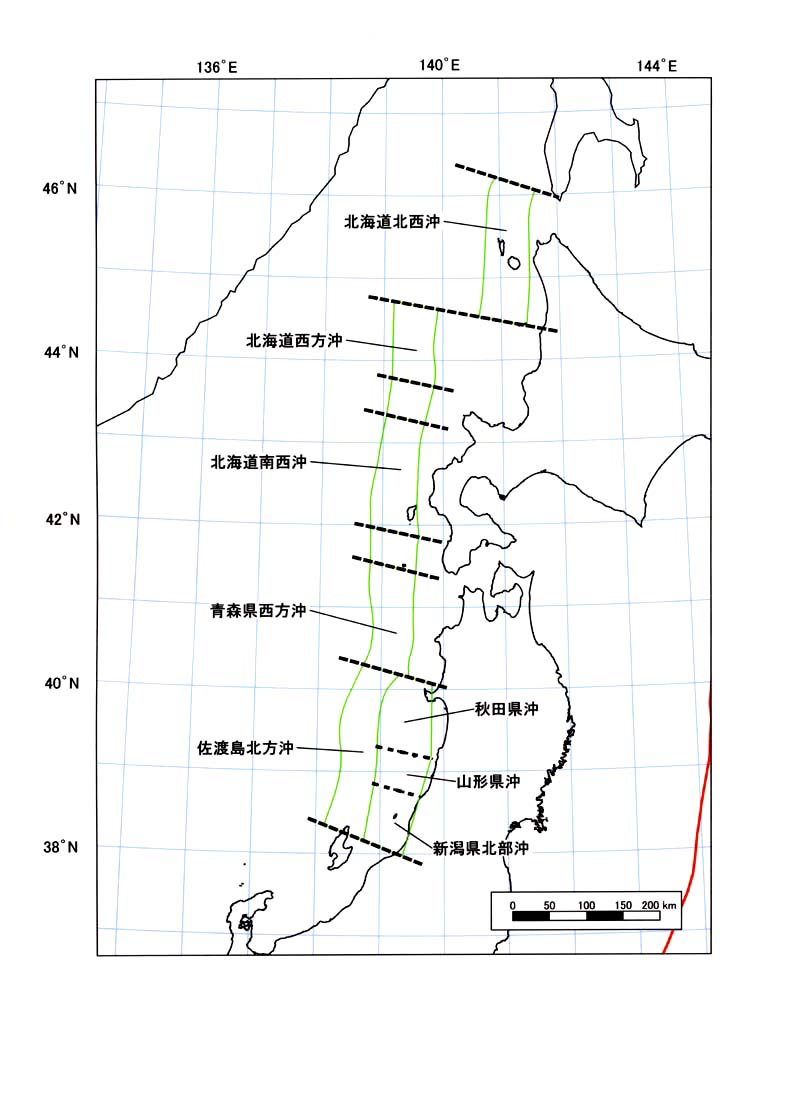
The eastern margin of the Sea of Japan defined by the Headquarters for Earthquake Research Promotion in 2003

The eastern margin of the Sea of Japan is a zone of concentrated geological strain which extends several hundred kilometers and north–south along the eastern margin of the Sea of Japan. The margin has undergone convergence tectonics since the end of the Pliocene. It is believed to be an incipient subduction zone which defines the tectonic boundary between the Amurian and Okhotsk plates. This geological zone is seismically active and has been the source of destructive tsunamis. The feature runs off the west coast of Honshu, passes west of the Shakotan Peninsula on Hokkaido and through the Strait of Tartary, between Sakhalin and mainland Russia.

== Plate tectonics ==
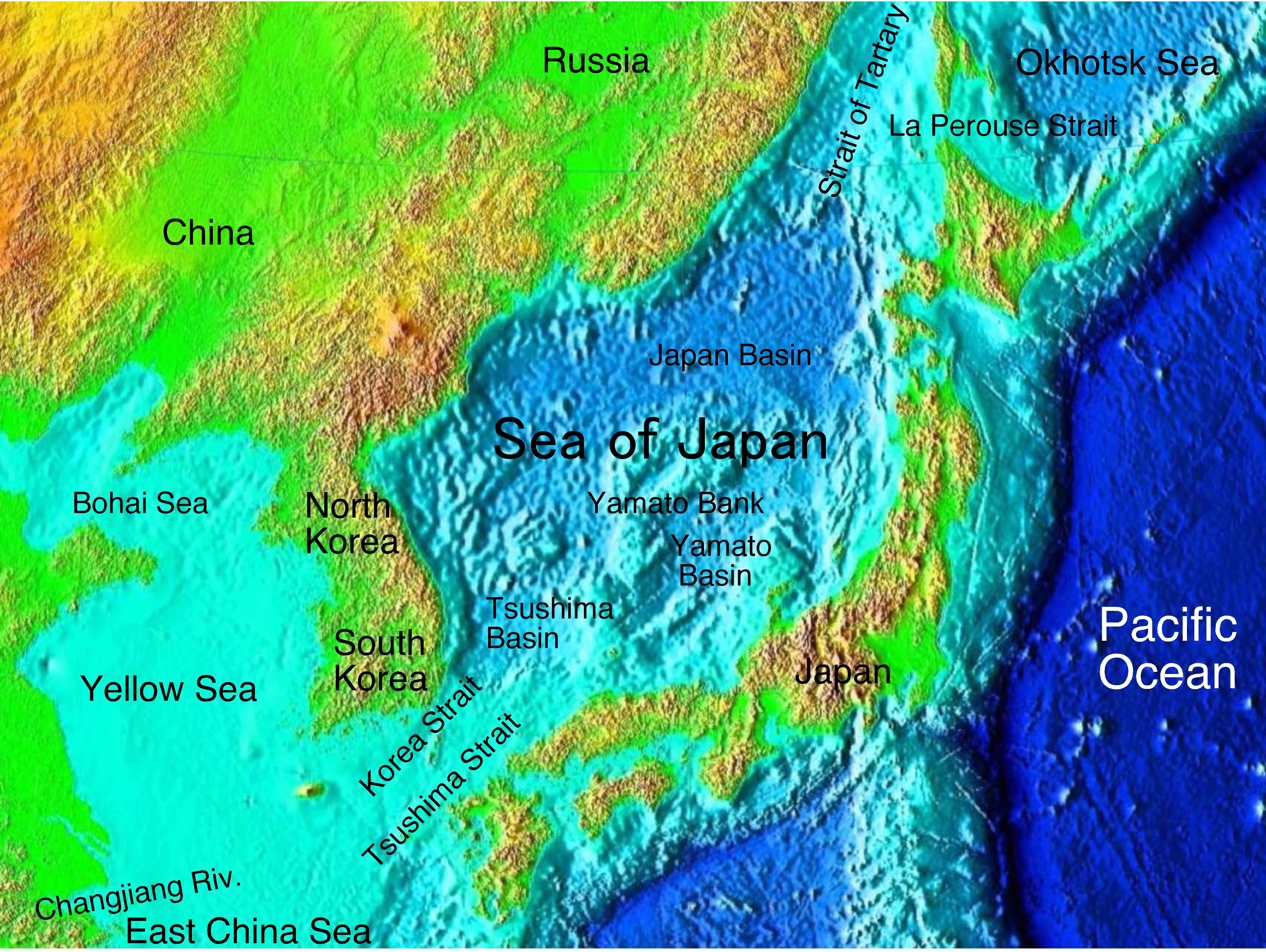
Topographical map of the Sea of Japan

The Sea of Japan represents a back-arc basin that formed via geological rifting of continental crust from the late Oligocene to middle Miocene (28–13 million years ago). The Sea of Japan can be divided into sub-basins; the Japan Basin, Yamato Basin and Tsushima Basin. Seafloor spreading in the Sea of Japan was restricted to the Japan Basin and ceased by the middle Miocene.

Following the end of seafloor spreading, its eastern margin experienced weak compression between 10 and 3.5 million years ago. Crustal shortening has been ongoing in the eastern margin and back-arc region of the Northeastern Japan Arc since 3.5 million years ago. This deformation is attributed to east–west compressive forces, forming fold and thrust belts along the eastern margin. The southern margin was subjected to north–south or northwest–southeast compression about 8–5 million years ago. Presently, the southern margin hosts mainly strike-slip faults.

The margin is located at the boundary marking the Amurian and Okhotsk microplates. Oceanic lithosphere from the Sea of Japan located on the Amurian Plate converges with the Japanese archipelago on the Okhotsk Plate. A Wadati–Benioff zone which is evidence for subduction, is absent in the zone, hence subduction is doubtful. However, it may be an incipient eastward-dipping subduction zone. In 1983, it was proposed that subduction along the eastern margin commenced about 1–2 million years ago.

The basis for defining this tectonic boundary is the occurrence of large magnitude 7 or greater earthquakes along a linear zone from offshore Niigata Prefecture to off the west coast of Hokkaido. Following the 1983 Nihonkai-Chubu earthquake, the idea of a young plate boundary was proposed, but its mechanism is unknown—it has been proposed as a transform boundary or collision zone.

== Location ==
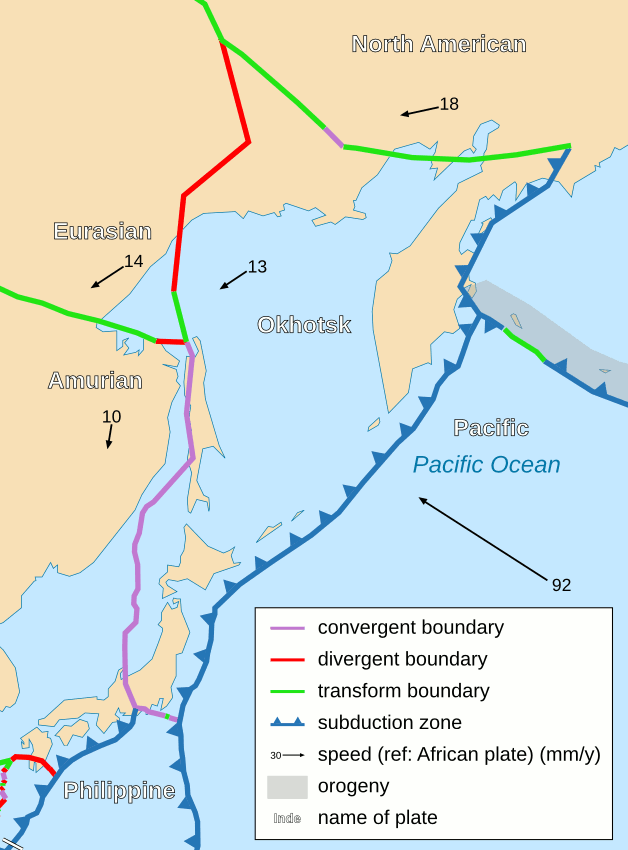
Plate boundary marked by the purple line

The margin passes north–south through the Shakotan Peninsula, Oshima Peninsula, and Tōhoku region. It junctions with the Niigata–Kobe Tectonic Zone and Itoigawa-Shizuoka Tectonic Line between Sado Island and the Noto Peninsula. It strikes southwest in the western part of Fukushima Prefecture and extends to the border of Nagano and Toyama Prefecture. It exits north of Lake Biwa and continues to the eastern part of Shimane Prefecture. In the Sea of Japan, the cluster of extensional faults which were active during the formation of the sea remained. After the Pliocene, the stress field evolved from extensional to convergence. The compressive forces reactivated these faults and displayed thrust mechanisms.

== Seismicity and tsunamis ==
The eastern margin of the Sea of Japan was the source of historically destructive earthquakes and tsunamis. These events were considered intraplate earthquakes until 1983 when the plate boundary theory was proposed. The associated geological faults related to the opening of the sea and compressive forces along the eastern margin influence seismic activity. Large earthquakes in 1833, 1940, 1964, 1983, and 1993 were the result of reverse faulting associated with the present deformation. The Sea of Japan is considered one of the world's most seismically active back-arc basins.

Year	Location	Event	Comments
1741	Oshima, off the coast of Hokkaido	Volcanic eruption	About 2,000 people killed along the west coast of Japan from the resulting tsunami. Homes and fishing boats destroyed in Korea. Tsunami magnitude calculated at M_{t} 8.4; largest tsunami in the region.
1792	Shiribeshi	Earthquake (M 7.1)	At least five people killed in Oshoro by the tsunami and additional tsunami casualties at Bikuni.
1793 (ja)	Aomori	Earthquake (M_{uk} 6.9)	Generated a tsunami along the Tsugaru Peninsula. Twelve people killed and 164 homes destroyed. Considerable damage in Ajigasawa.
1802 (ja)	Sado Island	Earthquake (M_{uk} 6.6)	At least 19 people killed, 732 homes destroyed and 1,423 damaged. Caused 2 m (6 ft 7 in) of uplift on the Ogi Peninsula, exposing pillow lava from the Miocene.
1804	Kisa, Akita	Earthquake (M_{w} 7.1)	At least 450 killed and 10,810 houses destroyed. A 1 m (3 ft 3 in) tsunami flooded 300 homes in Kisagata and Sakata.
1828	Sanjō Niigata	Earthquake (M_{uk} 6.9)	At least 1,443 killed and 11,750 houses ruined. No tsunami.
1833	Yamagata	Earthquake (M_{JMA} 7.5–7.7)	At least 150 people killed. Tsunami recorded with a maximum height of 8 m (26 ft) at Kamo.
1939	Akita	Earthquake (M_{JMA} 7.0)	Onshore event. At least 27 killed and 52 injured.
1940	Shakotan, Hokkaido	Earthquake (M_{w} 7.5)	Ten people killed, 24 injured, and many homes and fishing boats damaged or destroyed in Hokkaido, North Korea and Russia. Tsunami recorded with a maximum height of 5 m (16 ft) at Kamenka, Primorsky Krai.
1947	Shakotan, Hokkaido	Earthquake (M_{w} 7.1)	Felt at Haboro and Rumoi. Tsunami recorded with a height of 2 m (6 ft 7 in) at Wakkanai and Rishiri Island; 0.7 m (2 ft 4 in) at Haboro and several tens of centimeters at Otaru. Minor damage.
1964	Akita offshore	Earthquake (M_{w} 7.0)	Tsunami recorded 20 cm (7.9 in) along Niigata and Hokkaido prefectures.
1964	Niigata, Niigata	Earthquake (M_{w} 7.6)	At least 36 people killed and over 300 injured. Tsunami with a maximum height of 6 m (20 ft) at Fuya.
1971	Moneron Island, Russia	Earthquake (M_{w} 7.3)	Rockfalls and landslides on Moneron Island. Damage to buildings in Shebunino and Gomozavodsk on Sakhalin. Felt VII–VIII (MSK) on Moneron Island and VII (MMI) in southern Sakhalin. Tsunami recorded with a maximum height of 2 m (6 ft 7 in) at Shebunino, Sakhalin.
1983	Akita offshore	Earthquake (M_{w} 7.7)	Heavy damage due to liquefaction. At least 104 people dead—4 as a direct effect of the earthquake. One hundred deaths attributed to the tsunami including three deaths in South Korea.
1993	Okushiri, Hokkaido	Earthquake (M_{w} 7.7)	At least 230 people killed including 165 on Okushiri. Tsunami recorded 30.6 m (100 ft) on the southern coast of Okushiri; 10 m (33 ft) along the Hokkaido coast; also recorded in Russia and South Korea. Considerable damage from fires, landslides and tsunami. Three people missing along Russia's southeastern coast.
1995	Neftegorsk, Sakhalin	Earthquake (M_{w} 7.0)	Strike-slip earthquake producing up to 8.1 m (27 ft) of surface offset. Approximately 2,000 people dead in Neftegorsk.
2000	Uglegorsk, Sakhalin	Earthquake (M_{w} 6.8)	Eight people injured and many buildings damaged.
2004	Niigata	Earthquake (M_{w} 6.6)	Sixty eight people killed, 4,805 injured and extensive damage. Maximum intensity 7 on the JMA seismic intensity scale.
2007	Niigata	Earthquake (M_{w} 6.6)	Eleven people killed, 1,000 injured and 342 houses destroyed.
2007	Nevelsk, Sakhalin	Earthquake (M_{w} 6.2)	Occurred on a west-dipping reverse fault as opposed to east-dipping faults involved in large Sea of Japan earthquakes. Three tsunami waves measuring up to 3.2 m (10 ft). Two people killed, ten injured and severe damage occurred in Nevelsk. Over half of the town's 11,000 residents displaced. Maximum MSK-64 intensity VIII.
2011	Nagano	Earthquake (M_{w} 6.3)	Three people killed and nine injured. Seventy three houses destroyed and 427 damaged.
2014	Nagano	Earthquake (M_{w} 6.3)	Forty-one people were injured and 50 houses collapsed. Significant surface ruptures were observed.
2019	Yamagata	Earthquake (M_{w} 6.4)	Twenty-six people injured and 149 houses damaged.
2024	Noto	Earthquake (M_{w} 7.5.)	At least 203 people killed and 52 missing.

=== Offshore earthquakes ===
Large earthquakes with epicenters offshore and north of the Noto Peninsula are mostly accompanied by tsunamis. These events have recurrence intervals of 1,000 years. Due to their closer proximity to land, the accompanying tsunamis require a shorter time arriving compared to earthquakes along Japan's Pacific coast. These earthquakes tend to generate considerably large tsunamis.

=== Hazard ===
The 75 km (47 mi)-long Akita-oki seismic gap lies off the coast of Akita Prefecture. This plate-boundary segment is located between the rupture zones of the 1833 and 1983 earthquakes and has not experienced a major earthquake during historical times. It has the potential to produce a magnitude 7.5 earthquake, probably by the end of the 21st century. Another seismic gap of 50 km (31 mi) length is thought to exist off the coast of Hokkaido between the 1940 and 1993 rupture zones.

== See also ==
- List of tectonic plates
- List of tectonic plate interactions
