= Chōkai =

Chōkai may refer to:

- Two warships of the Imperial Japanese Navy:
  - Japanese cruiser Chōkai, a Takao-class heavy cruiser, which saw service in World War II
  - Japanese gunboat Chōkai, a Maya-class gunboat, which saw service in the First Sino-Japanese War and the Russo-Japanese War
- One warship of the Japan Maritime Self-Defense Force
  - Japanese destroyer JDS Chōkai (DDG-176), a Kongō-class guided missile destroyer commissioned in 1998
- Chōkai, Akita, a town merged to form the new city of Yurihonjō, Japan
- Mount Chōkai, a prominent mountain in northern Japan
- 9110 Choukai, an asteroid
