= Kameda Castle =

Castle

- 亀田城
- Yurihonjō, Akita Prefecture, Japan
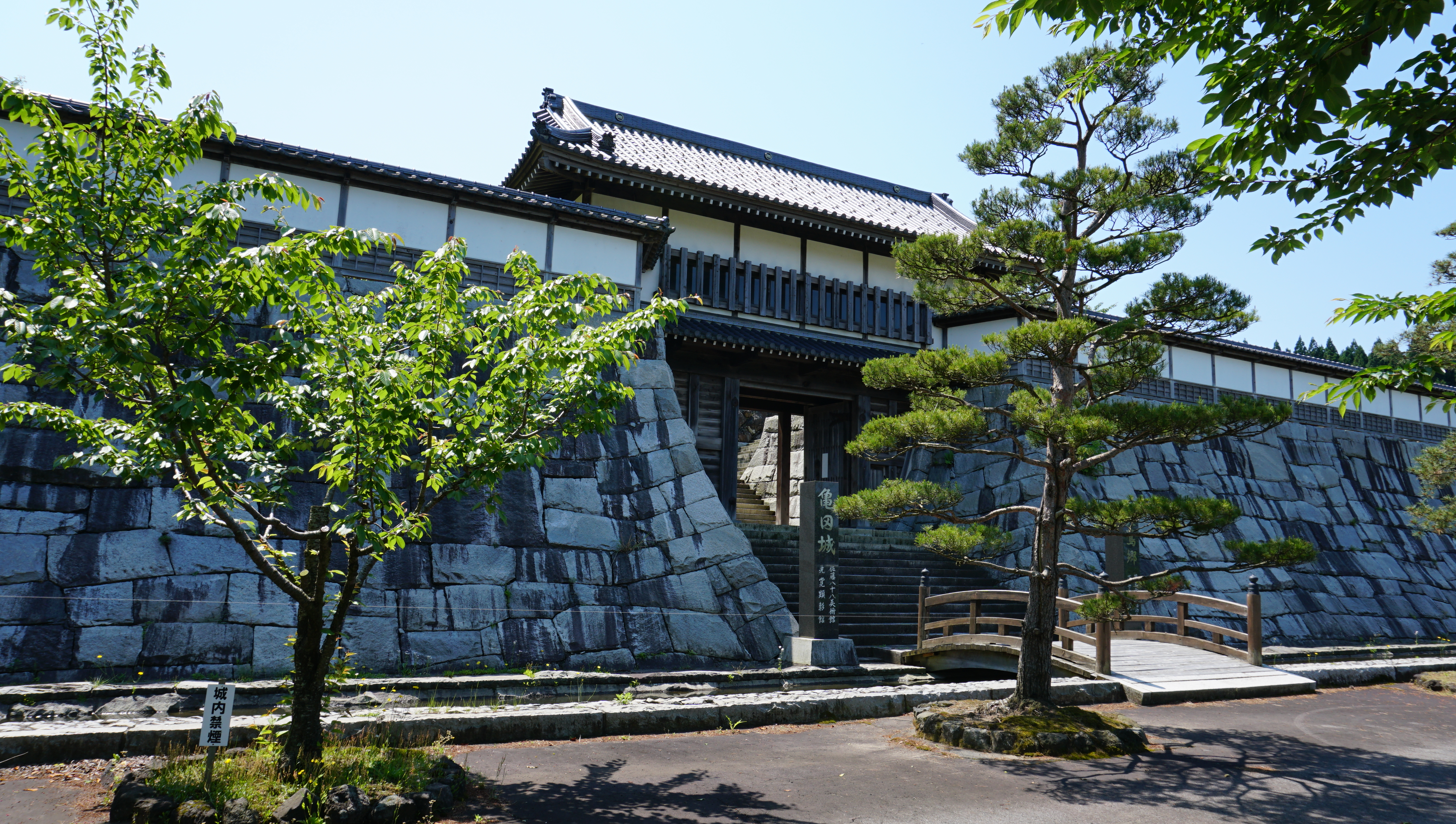
- Reconstructed gate of Kameda Castle

Site information
- Type: hirayama-style Japanese castle
- Open to the public: yes
- Condition: reconstructed 1974

Location
- Kameda Castle
- Location within Akita Prefecture Location within Japan
- Coordinates: 39°29′56.51″N 140°5′13.52″E

Site history
- Built: 1623
- Built by: Iwaki Yoshitaka
- In use: Edo period
- Demolished: 1871

Kameda Castle (亀田城, Kameda-jō) is a Japanese castle located in the Amasagi neighborhood of the city of Yurihonjō, southern Akita Prefecture, Japan. At the end of the Edo period, Kameda Castle was home to the Iwaki clan, daimyō of Kameda Domain. The castle was also known as "Amasagi-jō", but was never a true Japanese castle, but was officially a jin'ya, or fortified residence.

== History ==
Iwaki Yoshitaka was the third son of Satake Yoshishige. When Iwaki Tsunetake died without heir in 1590, he was ordered by Toyotomi Hideyoshi to change his name to Iwaki and to succeed as daimyō of the 120,000 koku Iwaki Domain in southern Mutsu Province. At the time of the Battle of Sekigahara, he was ordered by Tokugawa Ieyasu to lead an attack on Uesugi Kagekatsu based in Aizu Domain. However, his older brother, Satake Yoshinobu had decided to remain neutral in the conflict between the Tokugawa and the Toyotomi, and ordered his younger brother to do the same. After the establishment of the Tokugawa shogunate, Iwaki Yoshitaka was dispossessed of his domains, and was reduced in status to that of a ronin. Due to petitions for clemency by Doi Toshikatsu, Honda Masanobu and even the archpriest Tenkai, he was allowed to participate in the 1614 Osaka Summer Campaign, and was rewarded with the 10,000 koku Shinano-Nakamura Domain. His son, Iwaki Yoshitaka added another 10,000 koku to the clan's holdings in 1620. This new territory was in Yuri County in Dewa Province. Yoshitaka relocated his seat to a jin'ya which he built at the base of the mountain on which the former Akozu Castle had once been located.

His descendants ruled over Kameda Domain for 13 generations to the Meiji Restoration. However, the domain was not upgraded in status to allow for a formal designation as a "Castle-holding domain" until 1852.

== Description ==
The jin'ya consisted of two parts, the government office and the inner residence, protected by moats and an earthen embankment. The grounds are now occupied by the Kameda Elementary School and a Shinto shrine. Once a few traces of earthworks remain. In 1974, faux walls, a large gate and a faux tenshu were constructed by the city as a tourist attraction and to serve as a local art museum.

== Literature ==
- Schmorleitz, Morton S. (1974). Castles in Japan. Tokyo: Charles E. Tuttle Co. pp. 144–145. ISBN 0-8048-1102-4.
- Motoo, Hinago (1986). Japanese Castles. Tokyo: Kodansha. ISBN 0-87011-766-1.
- Mitchelhill, Jennifer (2004). Castles of the Samurai: Power and Beauty. Tokyo: Kodansha. ISBN 4-7700-2954-3.
