= Lifesaving at the 2001 World Games – Women's beach flags =

Lifesaving – women's beach flags at the 2001 World Games
- Venue: Iwaki Island Park, Iwaki, Japan
- Date: 26 August 2001
- Competitors: 26 from 9 nations

Medalists
gold medal	(Japan) Masami Yusa
silver medal	(Spain) Rosa González
bronze medal	(Japan) Kozue Fujiwara

The women's beach flags in lifesaving at the 2001 World Games took place on 26 August 2001 at the Iwaki Island Park in Iwaki, Japan.

== Competition format ==
A total of 26 athletes entered the competition. The best five athletes from each heat advances to the final.

== Results ==
=== Heats ===
Heat 1

Rank	Athlete	Nation	Note
1	Immacolata Esposito	Italy	Q
2	Aurélie Goffin	Belgium	Q
3	Monique Driessen	Netherlands	Q
4	Rosa González	Spain	Q
5	Kozue Fujiwara	Japan	Q
	Elena de Prada	Spain	
	Barbara Bindella	Italy	
	Karla Gilbert	Australia	
	Stacey Bowley	South Africa	
	Samantha Eagle	(United Kingdom) Great Britain	
	Emily Gleaves	(United Kingdom) Great Britain	
	Ellen Callens	Belgium	
	Steffy Eckers	Germany	

Heat 2

Rank	Athlete	Nation	Note
1	Tracey Martheze	South Africa	Q
2	Jenna Worlock	South Africa	Q
3	Marcella Prandi	Italy	Q
4	Masami Yusa	Japan	Q
5	Gabby Moses	Australia	Q
	Rebecca Rowe	(United Kingdom) Great Britain	
	Leigh Habler	Australia	
	Fukiko Sato	Japan	
	Carlien Schryvershof	Netherlands	
	Julia Hübner	Germany	
	Daniela Schmutzer	Germany	
	Esther Koolmees	Netherlands	
	Ann Quirijnen	Belgium	

=== Final ===
Rank	Athlete	Nation
1st place, gold medalist(s)	Masami Yusa	Japan
2nd place, silver medalist(s)	Rosa González	Spain
3rd place, bronze medalist(s)	Kozue Fujiwara	Japan
4	Jenna Worlock	South Africa
5	Gabby Moses	Australia
6	Aurélie Goffin	Belgium
7	Monique Driessen	Netherlands
8	Marcella Prandi	Italy
9	Immacolata Esposito	Italy
10	Tracey Martheze	South Africa
