= Lifesaving at the 2001 World Games – Men's surf race =

Lifesaving – men's surf race at the 2001 World Games
- Venue: Iwaki Island Park, Iwaki, Japan
- Date: 26 August 2001
- Competitors: 27 from 9 nations

Medalists
gold medal	(Australia) Zane Holmes
silver medal	(South Africa) Matthew Bouman
bronze medal	(Italy) Germano Proietti

The men's surf race in lifesaving at the 2001 World Games took place on 26 August 2001 at the Iwaki Island Park in Iwaki, Japan.

== Competition format ==
A total of 27 athletes entered the competition.

== Results ==
Rank	Athlete	Nation
1st place, gold medalist(s)	Zane Holmes	Australia
2nd place, silver medalist(s)	Matthew Bouman	South Africa
3rd place, bronze medalist(s)	Germano Proietti	Italy
4	Stephen Short	Australia
5	Ky Hurst	Australia
6	Lutz Heimann	Germany
7	Stuart Snell	(United Kingdom) Great Britain
8	Francisco Amat	Spain
9	Roel Jansen	Belgium
	Kengo Amagai	Japan
	Graeme Willcox	South Africa
	Freek Lemmens	Belgium
	Ryan Cox	(United Kingdom) Great Britain
	Jonathan del Amo	Spain
	Alessandro Giraldo	Italy
	Vincent Honet	Belgium
	Futoshi Kikuchi	Japan
	Gary Kurth	South Africa
	Matthias Löwenberg	Germany
	Federico Mastrostefano	Italy
	Geert Meesen	Netherlands
	Daan Pelders	Netherlands
	Craig Robinson	(United Kingdom) Great Britain
	Carsten Schlepphorst	Germany
	Hidenobu Tadano	Japan
	Pablo Terradillos	Spain
	Hans Vyge	Netherlands
