= Lifesaving at the 2001 World Games – Men's board race =

Lifesaving – men's board race at the 2001 World Games
- Venue: Iwaki Island Park, Iwaki, Japan
- Date: 26 August 2001
- Competitors: 26 from 9 nations

Medalists
gold medal	(Australia) Zane Holmes
silver medal	(South Africa) Ryan Butcher
bronze medal	(South Africa) Matthew Bouman

The men's board race in lifesaving at the 2001 World Games took place on 26 August 2001 at the Iwaki Island Park in Iwaki, Japan.

== Competition format ==
A total of 26 athletes entered the competition. The best eight athletes from each heat advances to the final.

== Results ==
=== Heats ===
Heat 1

Rank	Athlete	Nation	Note
1	Ryan Butcher	South Africa	Q
2	Ky Hurst	Australia	Q
3	Zane Holmes	Australia	Q
4	Matthew Bouman	South Africa	Q
5	Masahiro Hayashi	Japan	Q
6	Sergio González	Spain	Q
7	Takuya Iritani	Japan	Q
8	Vincent Honet	Belgium	Q
9	Lutz Heimann	Germany	
10	Alessandro Giraldo	Italy	
11	Ryan Brown	(United Kingdom) Great Britain	
12	Hugo Byman	Netherlands	
13	Federico De Marco	Italy	

Heat 2

Rank	Athlete	Nation	Note
1	Stephen Short	Australia	Q
2	Stuart Snell	(United Kingdom) Great Britain	Q
3	Craig Robinson	(United Kingdom) Great Britain	Q
4	Hidenobu Tadano	Japan	Q
5	Hans Vyge	Netherlands	Q
6	Francisco Jiménez	Spain	Q
7	Bart Laumen	Netherlands	Q
8	Germano Proietti	Italy	Q
9	Graeme Willcox	South Africa	
10	Matthias Löwenberg	Germany	
11	Freek Lemmens	Belgium	
12	Pablo Terradillos	Spain	
13	Maik Hofmann	Germany	

=== Final ===
Rank	Athlete	Nation
1st place, gold medalist(s)	Zane Holmes	Australia
2nd place, silver medalist(s)	Ryan Butcher	South Africa
3rd place, bronze medalist(s)	Matthew Bouman	South Africa
4	Stephen Short	Australia
5	Ky Hurst	Australia
6	Hidenobu Tadano	Japan
7	Takuya Iritani	Japan
8	Masahiro Hayashi	Japan
9	Craig Robinson	(United Kingdom) Great Britain
10	Stuart Snell	(United Kingdom) Great Britain
	Hans Vyge	Netherlands
	Francisco Jiménez	Spain
	Sergio González	Spain
	Vincent Honet	Belgium
	Germano Proietti	Italy
	Bart Laumen	Netherlands
