= Chōkai Quasi-National Park =

Quasi-national park in Akita and Yamagata prefecture, Japan

- 鳥海国定公園
- IUCN category V (protected landscape/seascape)
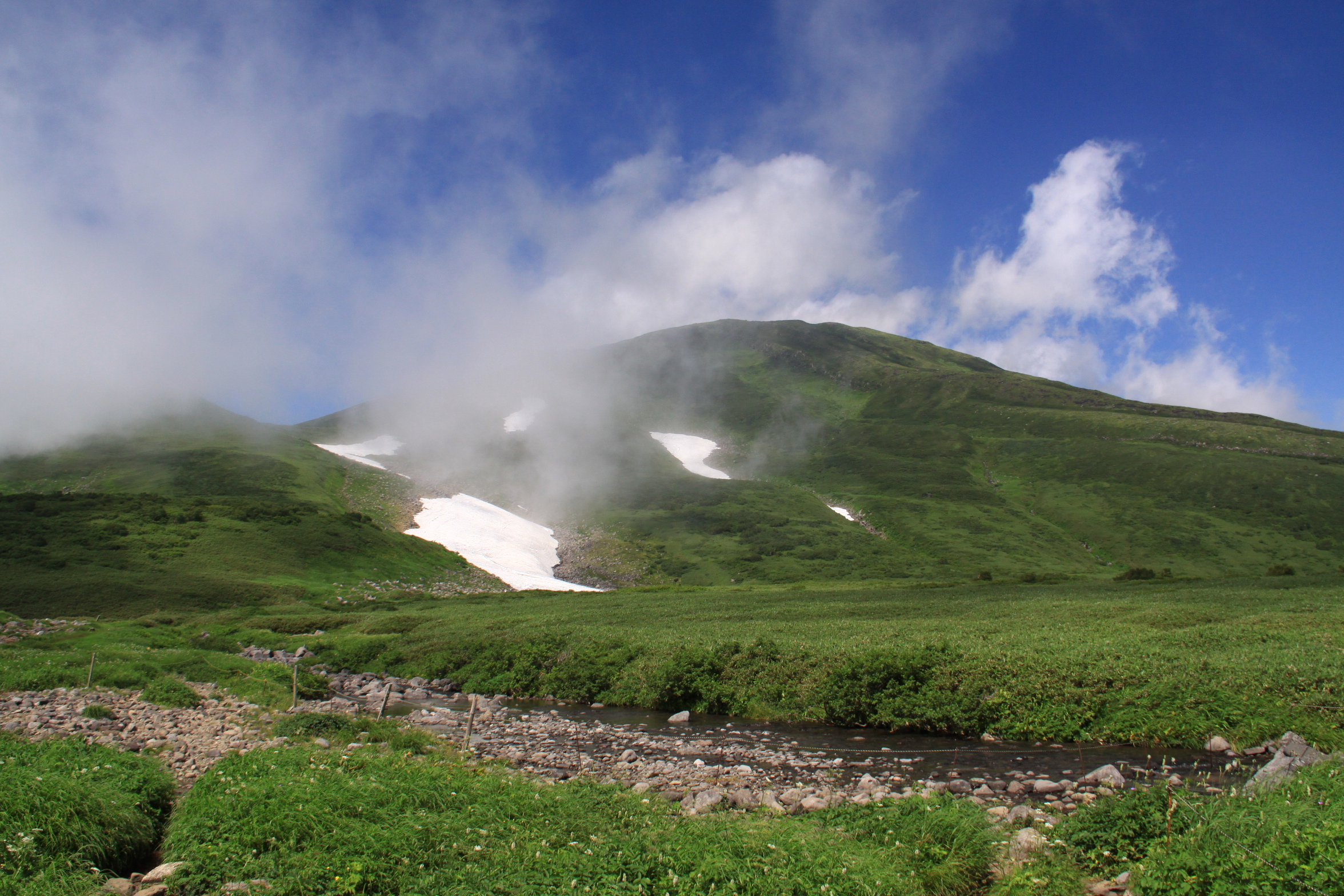
- Mount Chōkai (2,236 m)

- Location within Japan
- Location: Tōhoku, Japan
- Coordinates: 39°05′57″N 140°02′56″E
- Area: 289.55 km^{2} (111.80 sq mi)
- Established: 24 July 1963
- Governing body: Akita Prefecture, Yamagata Prefecture, Japan

Chōkai Quasi-National Park (鳥海国定公園, Chōkai Kokutei Kōen) is a Quasi-National Park in Akita and Yamagata Prefectures, Japan. Established in 1963, the park's central feature is the twin volcano of Mount Chōkai, although it also includes coastal areas of northern Yamagata and southern Akita Prefectures. It is rated a protected landscape (category V) according to the IUCN. The landscape of Kisakata (象潟), featured in Bashō's Oku no Hosomichi, was transformed by the uplift of land in an earthquake of 1804.

Like all Quasi-National Parks in Japan, the park is managed by the local prefectural governments.

== Related municipalities ==
- Akita: Nikaho, Yurihonjō
- Yamagata: Sakata, Yuza

== See also ==
- National Parks of Japan
