= 2011 Nagano earthquake =

Earthquake in Japan

- 長野県北部地震 栄村大震災
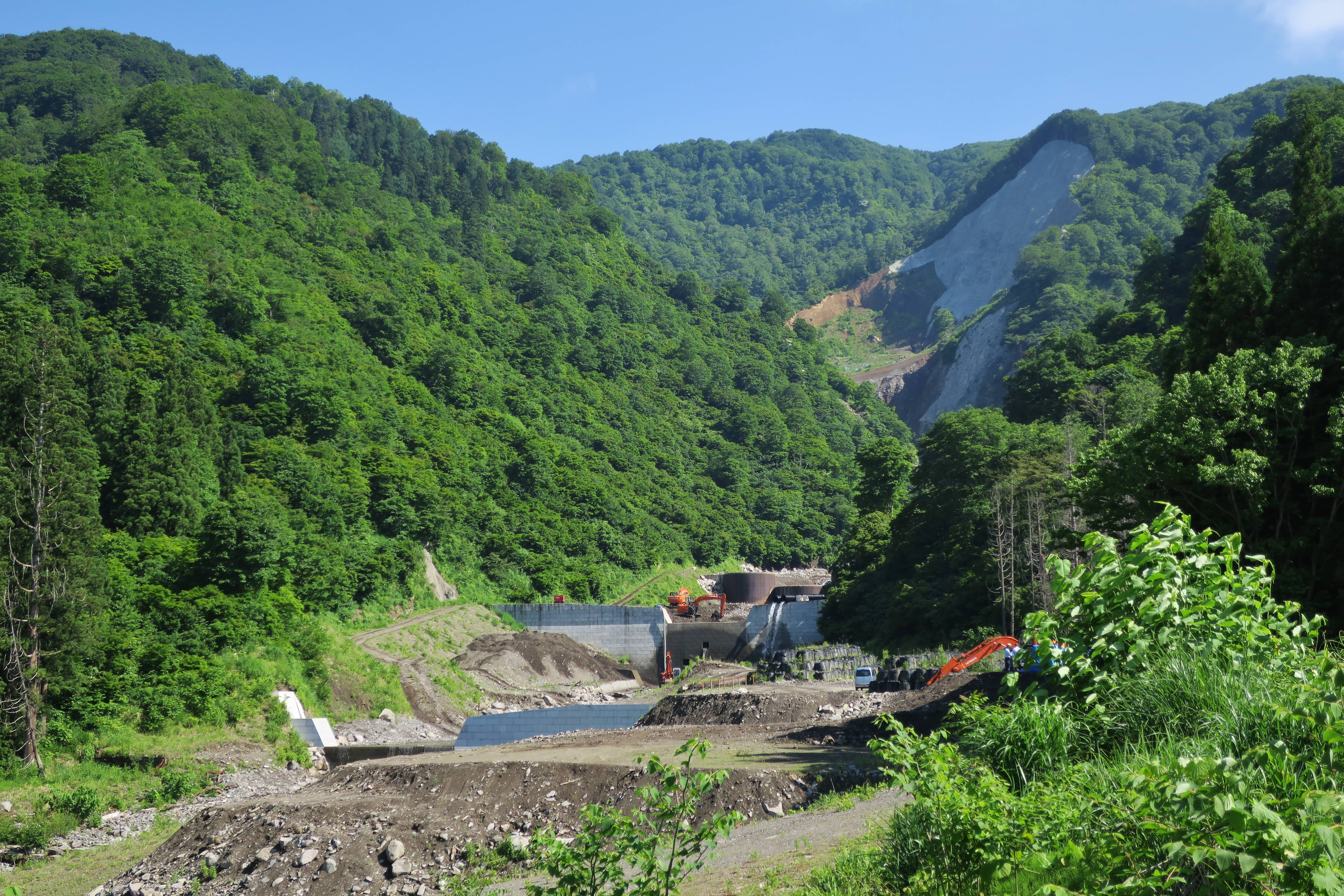
- Nakajo River landslide after the earthquake

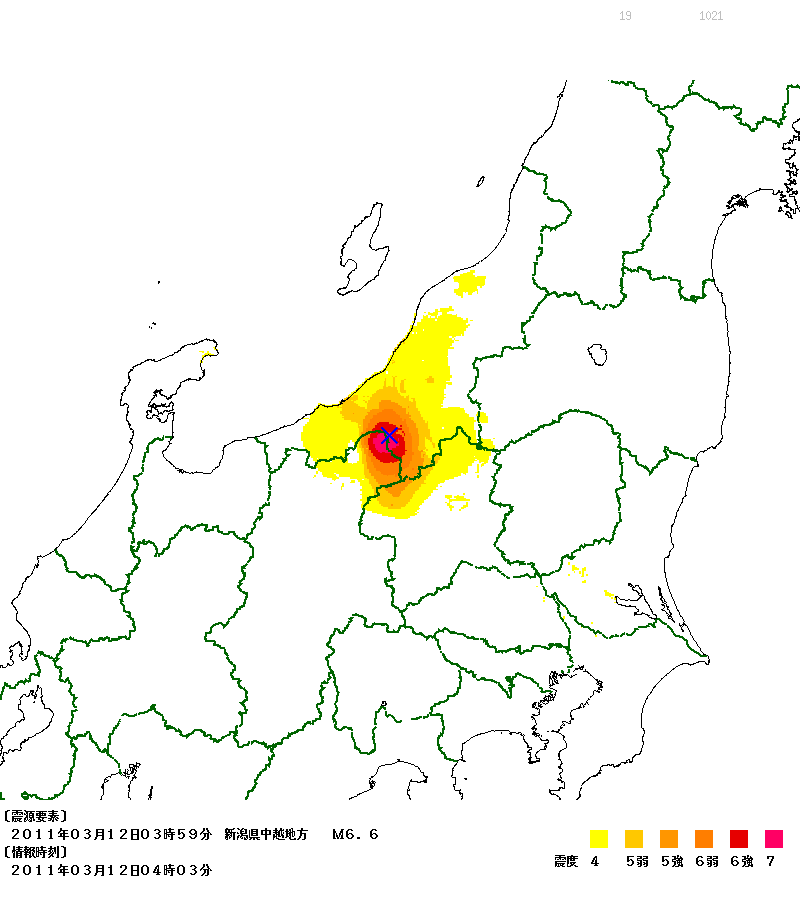
- 2011 Nagano earthquake shakemap by JMA
- UTC time: 2011-03-11 18:59
- ISC event: 600540067
- USGS-ANSS: ComCat
- Local date: March 12, 2011
- Local time: 03:59 JTC
- Magnitude: M_{JMA} 6.7
- Depth: 8 km (5 mi)
- Epicenter: 36°59′6″N 138°35′48″E
- Max. intensity: JMA 6+
- Casualties: 3 dead,46 injured

The 2011 Nagano earthquake (長野県北部地震, Nagano-ken Hokubu Jishin) was an earthquake that occurred near the border between Niigata and Nagano prefectures at 3:59 JST on March 12, 2011. The depth of the hypocenter was 8 km and magnitude of the earthquake was M_{JMA} 6.7.

The strongest shaking was felt in Sakae, Nagano, where a maximum JMA intensity of shindo 6+ was recorded. Thus, damage due to the earthquake was concentrated in Sakae, and so the earthquake is also called the Sakae earthquake (栄村大震災, Sakae-mura Daishinsai). Three people were killed.

== Intensity ==
Intensity	Prefecture	Location
6+	Nagano	Sakae
6-	Niigata	Tōkamachi, Tsunan
5+	Gunma	Nakanojō
5+	Niigata	Jōetsu
5-	Niigata	Nagaoka, Kashiwazaki, Izumozaki, Yuzawa, Kariwa, Minamiuonuma
5-	Nagano	Nozawaonsen

== Relationship with the Tōhoku earthquake ==
The earthquake occurred only around 13 hours after the Great East Japan Earthquake, the epicenter of which was located offshore in the Tōhoku region. For this reason it is believed that the Nagano earthquake was a remotely triggered earthquake caused by the Great East Japan Earthquake.

Since this earthquake occurred immediately after the Tōhoku earthquake, itself an event which caused unprecedented damage, the amount of coverage by mass media of the Nagano earthquake was less than that afforded to the Tōhoku earthquake.

A magnitude 6.0 earthquake occurred in three days later in Shizuoka on March 15, 2011, which was also considered to be an induced earthquake of the Tōhoku earthquake.
