= Lifesaving at the 2001 World Games – Men's beach flags =

Lifesaving – men's beach flags at the 2001 World Games
- Venue: Iwaki Island Park, Iwaki, Japan
- Date: 26 August 2001
- Competitors: 25 from 9 nations

Medalists
gold medal	(Spain) Sergio González
silver medal	(South Africa) Waleed Damon
bronze medal	(Japan) Hidenobu Tadano

The men's beach flags in lifesaving at the 2001 World Games took place on 26 August 2001 at the Iwaki Island Park in Iwaki, Japan.

== Competition format ==
A total of 25 athletes entered the competition. The best five athletes from each heat advances to the final.

== Results ==
=== Heats ===
Heat 1

Rank	Athlete	Nation	Note
1	Jason O'Pray	Australia	Q
2	Waleed Damon	South Africa	Q
3	Renaat Dreesen	Belgium	Q
4	Maik Hofmann	Germany	Q
5	Sergio González	Spain	Q
	Ryan Cox	(United Kingdom) Great Britain	
	Alessandro Giraldo	Italy	
	Takuya Iritani	Japan	
	Hugo Byman	Netherlands	
	Federico De Marco	Italy	
	Futoshi Kikuchi	Japan	
	Ryan Brown	(United Kingdom) Great Britain	
	Jonathan del Amo	Spain	

Heat 2

Rank	Athlete	Nation	Note
1	Danilo Mollari	Italy	Q
2	Lutz Heimann	Germany	Q
3	Hidenobu Tadano	Japan	Q
4	Luke Turner	Australia	Q
5	Stephen Short	Australia	Q
	Freek Lemmens	Belgium	
	Daan Pelders	Netherlands	
	Bart Geerts	Belgium	
	Bart Laumen	Netherlands	
	Nick Polkinghorne	(United Kingdom) Great Britain	
	Graeme Willcox	South Africa	
	Matthias Löwenberg	Germany	

=== Final ===
Rank	Athlete	Nation
1st place, gold medalist(s)	Sergio González	Spain
2nd place, silver medalist(s)	Waleed Damon	South Africa
3rd place, bronze medalist(s)	Hidenobu Tadano	Japan
4	Lutz Heimann	Germany
5	Maik Hofmann	Germany
6	Renaat Dreesen	Belgium
7	Luke Turner	Australia
8	Jason O'Pray	Australia
9	Stephen Short	Australia
10	Danilo Mollari	Italy
