= Higashiyuri, Akita =

Dissolved municipality in Akita prefecture, Japan

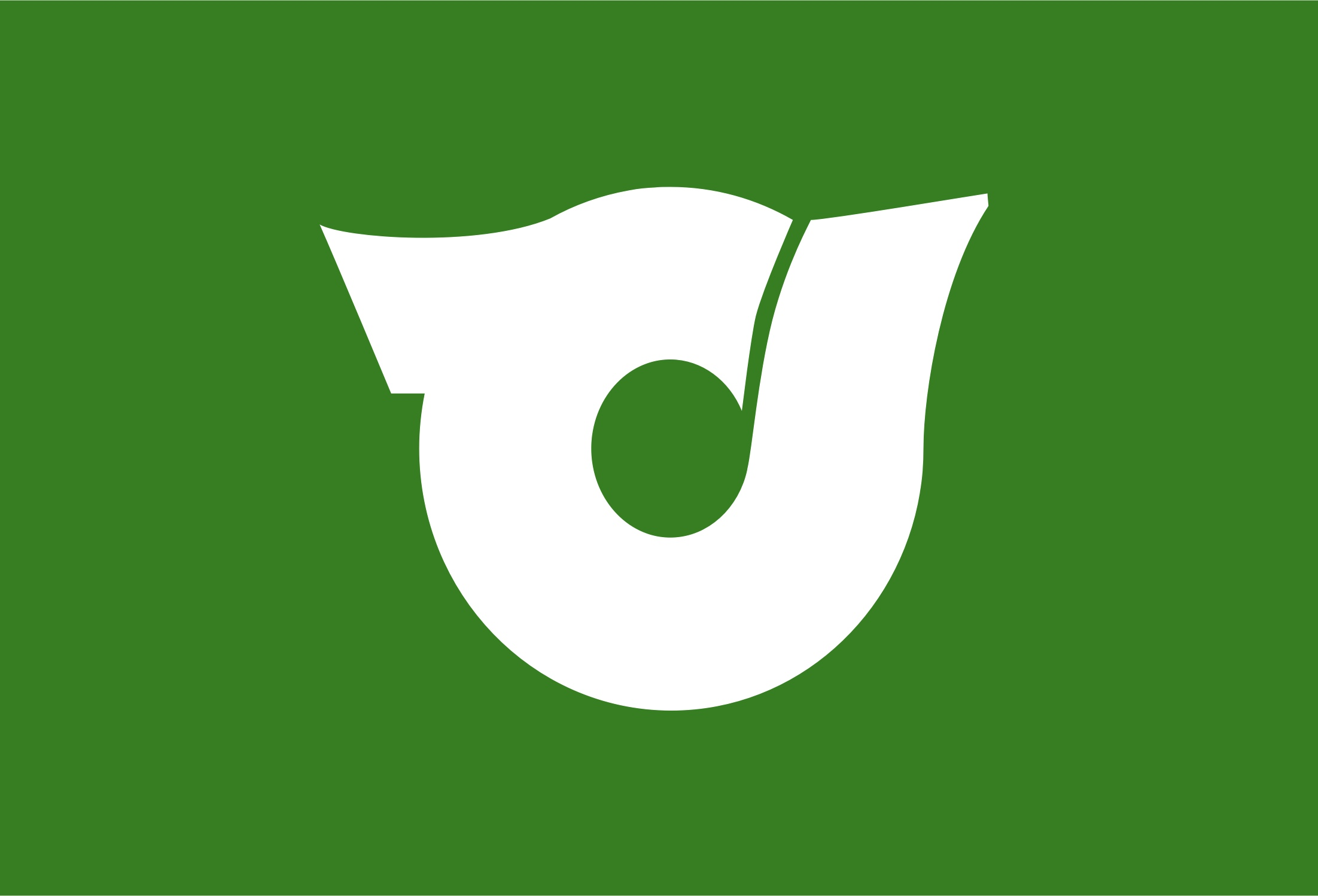
Flag of Higashiyuri, Akita

Higashiyuri (東由利町, Higashiyuri-machi) was a town located in Yuri District, Akita Prefecture, Japan.

In 2003, the town had an estimated population of 4,536 and a density of 30.21 persons per km^{2}. The total area was 150.17 km^{2}.

On March 22, 2005, Higashiyuri, along with the city of Honjō; and the towns of Chōkai, Iwaki, Nishime, Ōuchi, Yashima and Yuri (all from Yuri District), merged to create the city of Yurihonjō.
