= Yuri, Akita =

Yuri 由利町
- Former settlement
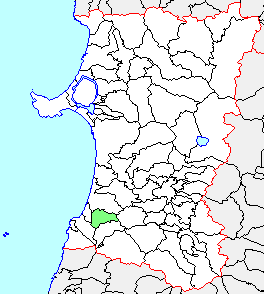
- Interactive map of Yuri
- Country: Japan
- Prefecture: Akita
- District: Yuri

Yuri (由利町, Yuri-machi) was a town located in Yuri District, Akita Prefecture, Japan.

In 2003, the town had an estimated population of 5,883 and a density of 60.94 persons per km^{2}. The total area was 96.53 km^{2}.

On March 22, 2005, Yuri, along with the city of Honjō; and the towns of Chōkai, Higashiyuri, Iwaki, Nishime, Ōuchi and Yashima (all from Yuri District), merged to create the city of Yurihonjō.

== Notable people ==
- Ryōzō Katō
- Akira Komatsu
