= Nishime, Akita =

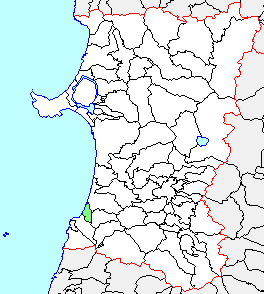
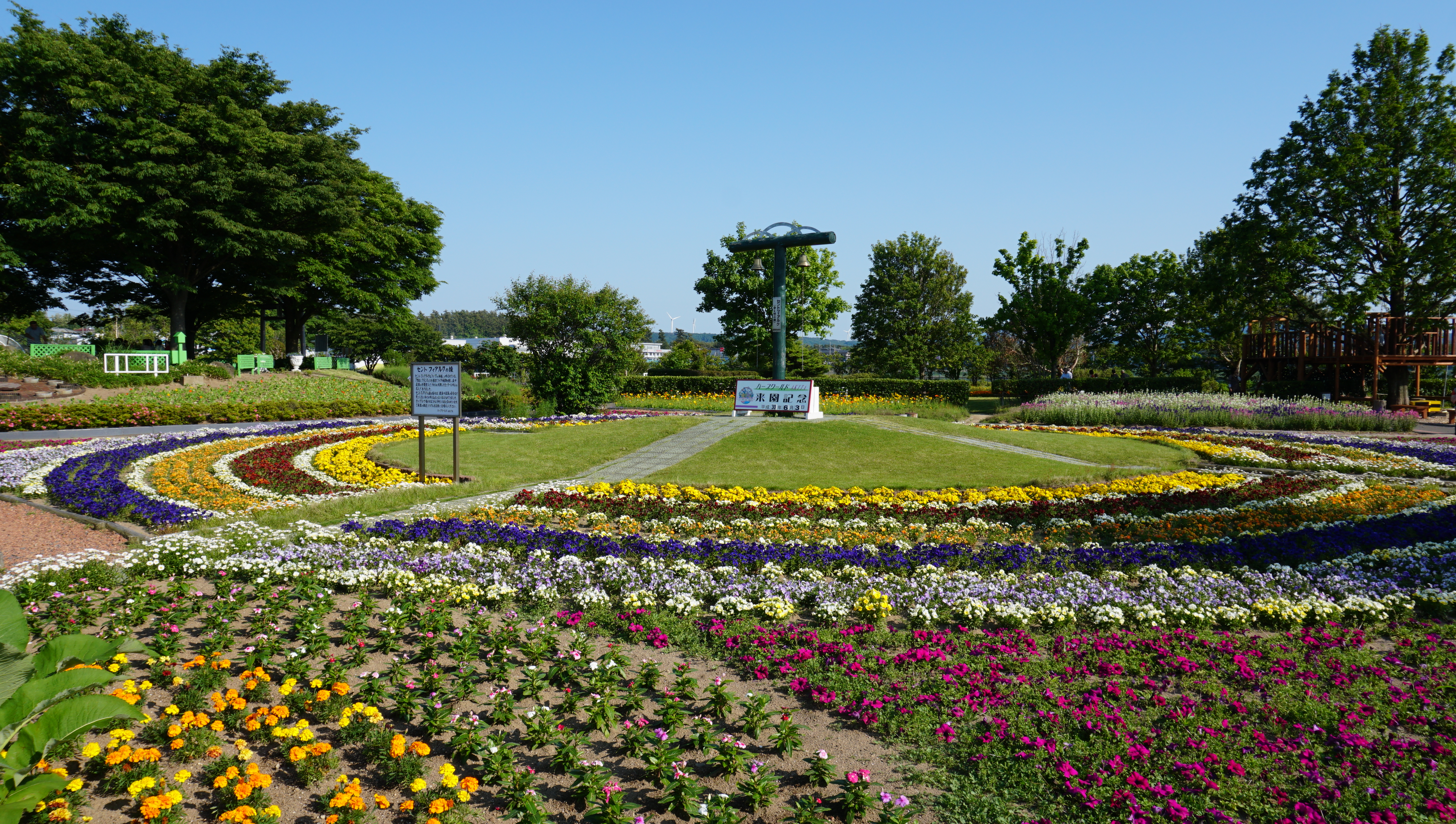
- Herb World Akita
- Interactive map of Nishime, Akita
- Country: Japan
- Prefecture: Akita
- District: Yuri

Nishime (西目町, Nishime-machi) was a town located in Yuri District, Akita Prefecture, Japan.

In 2003, the town had an estimated population of 6,672 and a density of 175.30 persons per km^{2}. The total area was 38.06 km^{2}.

On March 22, 2005, Nishime, along with the city of Honjō; and the towns of Chōkai, Higashiyuri, Iwaki, Ōuchi, Yashima and Yuri (all from Yuri District), merged to create the city of Yurihonjō.

== Location map ==
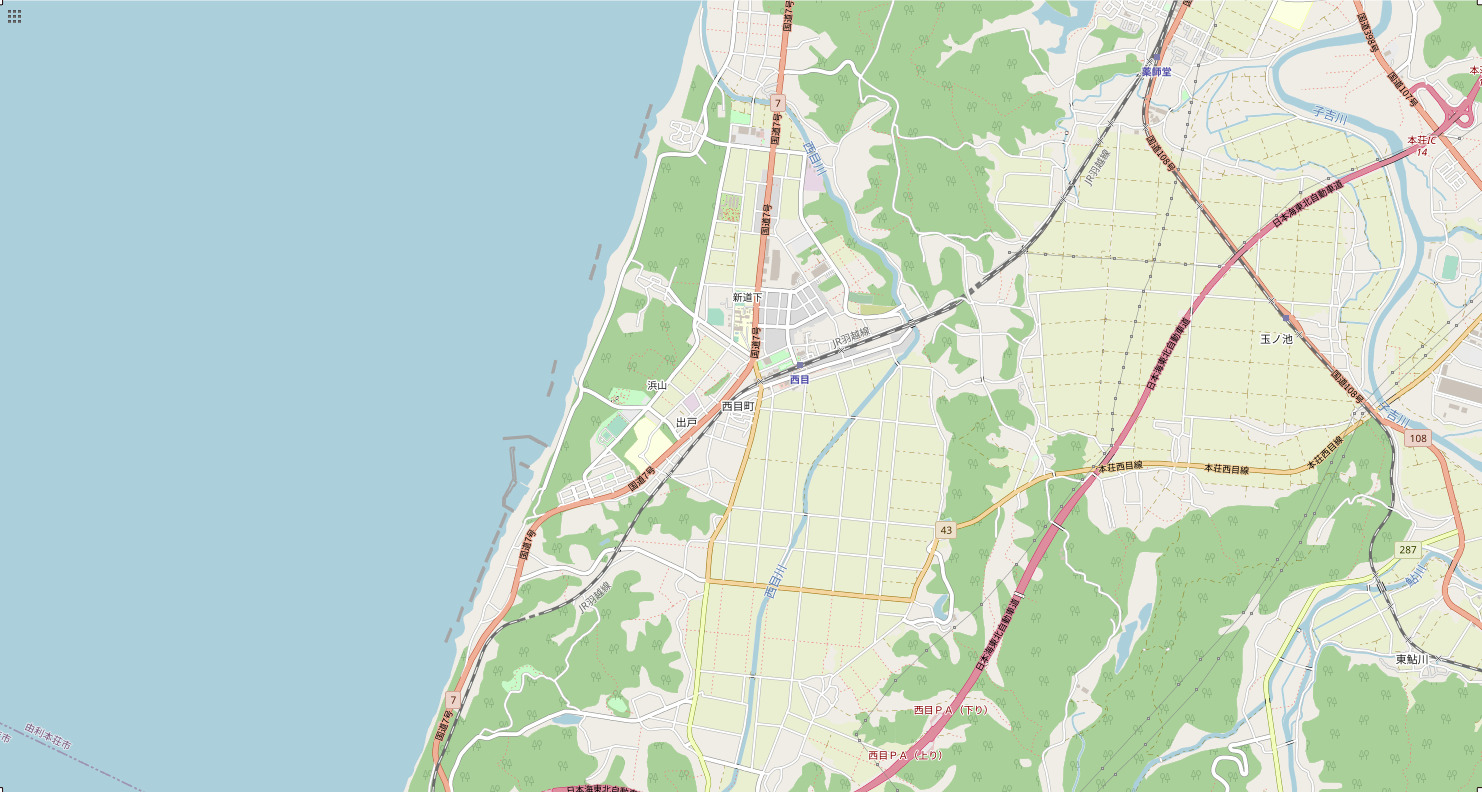
