= Iwaki clan =

Iwaki 岩城
- Iwaki family crest
- Home province: Mutsu Province
- Parent house: Taira clan
- Titles: daimyō (Edo period); viscount (post-Edo period)
- Final ruler: Iwaki Takakuni
- Ruled until: 1873 (Abolition of the han system)

The Iwaki clan (Japanese: 岩城氏, Hepburn: Iwaki shi) was a Japanese samurai clan that claimed descent from the Hitachi-Heishi, a cadet branch of the Taira clan. However, this connection is tenuous and not backed by documentary evidence, suggesting that the Iwaki were instead descendants of the local Kuni no miyatsuko, and adopted the legend of Taira descent for greater prestige.

== Early history ==
During the Heian period, they controlled territory in what is now the city of Iwaki, Fukushima and had close ties with the Northern Fujiwara of Hiraizumi. The Shiramizu Amidadō in Iwaki was built in 1160 by Princess Tokuhime, daughter of Fujiwara no Kiyohira of the Hiraizumi Fujiwara clan, as a memorial temple for her husband, Iwaki Norimichi. The Iwaki maintained their territories under the Kamakura shogunate but were often in conflict with the Iga clan. In the Muromachi period, they were sometimes allied with the more powerful Satake clan or Yuki clan, or were sometimes opposed. Into the Sengoku period, then situation became ever more complex, as the powerful Sōma clan, Tamura clan, Date clan and Ashina clan to the north all joined the ranks of sometime allies and sometime enemies. The 15th hereditary chieftain, Iwaki Shigetaka was pressured by Sōma Akitani into giving his daughter, Kubo-hime, as wife to Date Harumune and accepting the son of this union as his heir. The effectively placed the Iwaki under Date hegemony, and Iwaki Tsunetaka accompanied Date Masamune to Odawara to pledge fealty to Toyotomi Hideyoshi in 1590. Iwaki Tsunetaka died shortly afterwards, and as his son was still an infant, the clan adopted the son of Satake Yoshishige, Sadataka as heir. At the time of the Battle of Sekigahara, although the Iwaki clan supported the Eastern Army of Tokugawa Ieyasu, the Satake clan remained neutral, and Iwaki Sadataka obeyed the orders of his older brother, Satake Yoshinobu not to attack the forces of Uesugi Kagekatsu in Aizu Domain. As a result, with the establishment of the Tokugawa shogunate, the Iwaki clan was punished by the forfeiture of its ancestral 120,000 koku domains.

Ieyasu was petitioned by Doi Toshikatsu, Honda Tadanobu and about 300 other samurai officials to show clemency to Iwaki Sadataka, and he was permitted fight in the 1614 Osaka Summer Campaign, for which he was awarded 10,000 koku domain in Shinano Province the following year. His son, Iwaki Yoshitaka (later known as Satake Yoshitaka) added another 10,000 koku to this Shinano-Nakamura Domain in 1620. These territories were in Yuri County, Dewa Province, and he relocated his seat there in 1624. His descendants continued to ruler as daimyō of Kameda Domain for 13 generations to the Meiji restoration.

During the Boshin War of 1868–69, the Iwaki were signatories to the pact that formed the Ōuetsu Reppan Dōmei.Despite its meager military resources, the domain fought against the forces of pro-Imperial Shinjō Domain until an agreement was reached. The new Meiji government penalized the domain with a reduction in revenues to 18,000 koku. With the abolition of the han system in July 1871, and the absorption of Kameda Domain into Akita Prefecture, the final daimyō of Kameda, Iwaki Takakuni, relocated to Tokyo. In 1884, he and his descendants were granted the title of viscount (shishaku) in the kazoku peerage.
