= Kameda Domain =

Kameda Domain 亀田藩
- under Tokugawa shogunate Japan
- 1623–1871
- Capital: Kameda Castle
  - Type: Daimyō
- Historical era: Edo period
  - Established: 1623
  - Disestablished: 1871
- Today part of: part of Akita Prefecture

Kameda Domain (亀田藩, Kameda-han) was a feudal domain in Edo period Japan, located in Dewa Province (modern-day Akita Prefecture), Japan. It was centered on Kameda Castle in what is now the city of Yurihonjō, Akita.

== History ==
Much of Dewa Province was controlled by the powerful Mogami clan during the Sengoku period. However, the Mogami were dispossessed by the Tokugawa shogunate in 1622, with the majority of their holdings going to the Satake clan, who were transferred from Hitachi Province, to their new (and much smaller) holdings at Kubota Domain.

The Iwaki clan originally ruled a 120,000 koku domain in the Hamadōri region of southeast Mutsu Province since the Kamakura period, and had established close ties to both the Date clan of Sendai and the Satake clan of Hitachi during the late Sengoku period. Although the Iwaki clan sided with Tokugawa Ieyasu at the Battle of Sekigahara, due to their close familial ties with Satake Yoshinobu, they refused to participate in attack Ieyasu ordered on Uesugi Kagekatsu at Aizuwakamatsu and were consequently dispossessed of their holdings.

In 1616, the Tokugawa shogunate relented, and allowed the clan to have the 10,000 koku Shinano Nakamura Domain. In 1623, Iwaki Yoshitaka was transferred to the newly created 20,000 koku Kameda Domain, a compact holding consisting of 71 villages in Yuki County where his descendants ruled for 13 generations to the Meiji restoration. Relations remained very strong between with the Satake clan, almost to the extent that Kameda Domain became a semi-subsidiary domain of Kubota Domain. This drew unfavorable attention from the Tokugawa shogunate, and in 1718, when Iwaki Hidetaka died, his successor was selected from a branch of the Date clan. Ties between the Iwaki and Date clans strengthened over the next several generations.

The domain had a population of 23,894 people in 4356 households per the 1869 census. The clan maintained its primary residence (kamiyashiki) in Edo at Daidokoro-cho, in Koishikawa.

During the Boshin war, Kameda Domain remained a member of the Ōuetsu Reppan Dōmei; even after Kubota Domain switched sides. Despite its meager military resources, the domain fought against the forces of pro-Imperial Shinjō Domain until an agreement was reached.

The new Meiji government penalized the domain with a reduction in revenues to 18,000 koku. With the abolition of the han system in July 1871, and the absorption of Kameda Domain into Akita Prefecture, the final daimyō of Kameda, Iwaki Takakuni, relocated to Tokyo. In 1884, he and his descendants were granted the title of viscount (shishaku) in the kazoku peerage.

== List of daimyō ==
- Iwaki clan (tozama) 1623-1871

#	Name	Tenure	Courtesy title	Court Rank	kokudaka
1	Iwaki Yoshitaka (佐竹義隆)	1623–1634	Shuri-no-kami (修理大夫)	Lower 5th (従五位下)	20,000 koku
2	Iwaki Nobutaka (岩城宣隆)	1628-1656	Tajima-no-kami (但馬守)	Lower 5th (従五位下)	20,000 koku
3	Iwaki Shigetaka (岩城重隆)	1656-1704	Iyo-no-kami (伊予守)	Lower 5th (従五位下)	20,000 koku
4	Iwaki Hidetaka (岩城秀隆)	1685–1735	Iyo-no-kami (伊予守)	Lower 5th (従五位下)	20,000 koku
5	Iwaki Takatsugu (岩城隆韶)	1718-1745	Tajima-no-kami (但馬守)	Lower 5th (従五位下)	20,000 koku
6	Iwaki Takyoshi (岩城隆恭)	1745-1782	Iyo-no-kami (伊予守)	Lower 5th (従五位下)	20,000 koku
7	Iwaki Takanori (岩城隆恕)	1782-1817	Iyo-no-kami (伊予守)	Lower 5th (従五位下)	20,000 koku
8	Iwaki Takahiro (岩城隆喜)	1817-1853	Iyo-no-kami (伊予守)	Lower 5th (従五位下)	20,000 koku
9	Iwaki Takanaga (岩城隆永)	1854-1855	Tajima-no-kami (但馬守)	Lower 5th (従五位下)	20,000 koku
10	Iwaki Takanobu (岩城隆信)	1855–1855	none -	Lower 5th (従五位下)	20,000 koku
11	Iwaki Takamasa (岩城隆政)	1855–1861	Shuri-no-kami (修理大夫)	Lower 5th (従五位下)	20,000 koku
12	Iwaki Takakuni (岩城隆邦)	1861-1869	Sakyō-no-daibu (左京大夫)	Lower 5th (従五位下)	20,000 koku
13	Iwaki Takaaki (岩城隆彰)	1869-1871	Viscount	5th (従五位)	20,000 ->18,000 koku
