= Chōkai, Akita =

Dissolved municipality in Akita prefecture, Japan

Chōkai (鳥海町, Chōkai-machi) was a town located in Yuri District, Akita Prefecture, Japan.

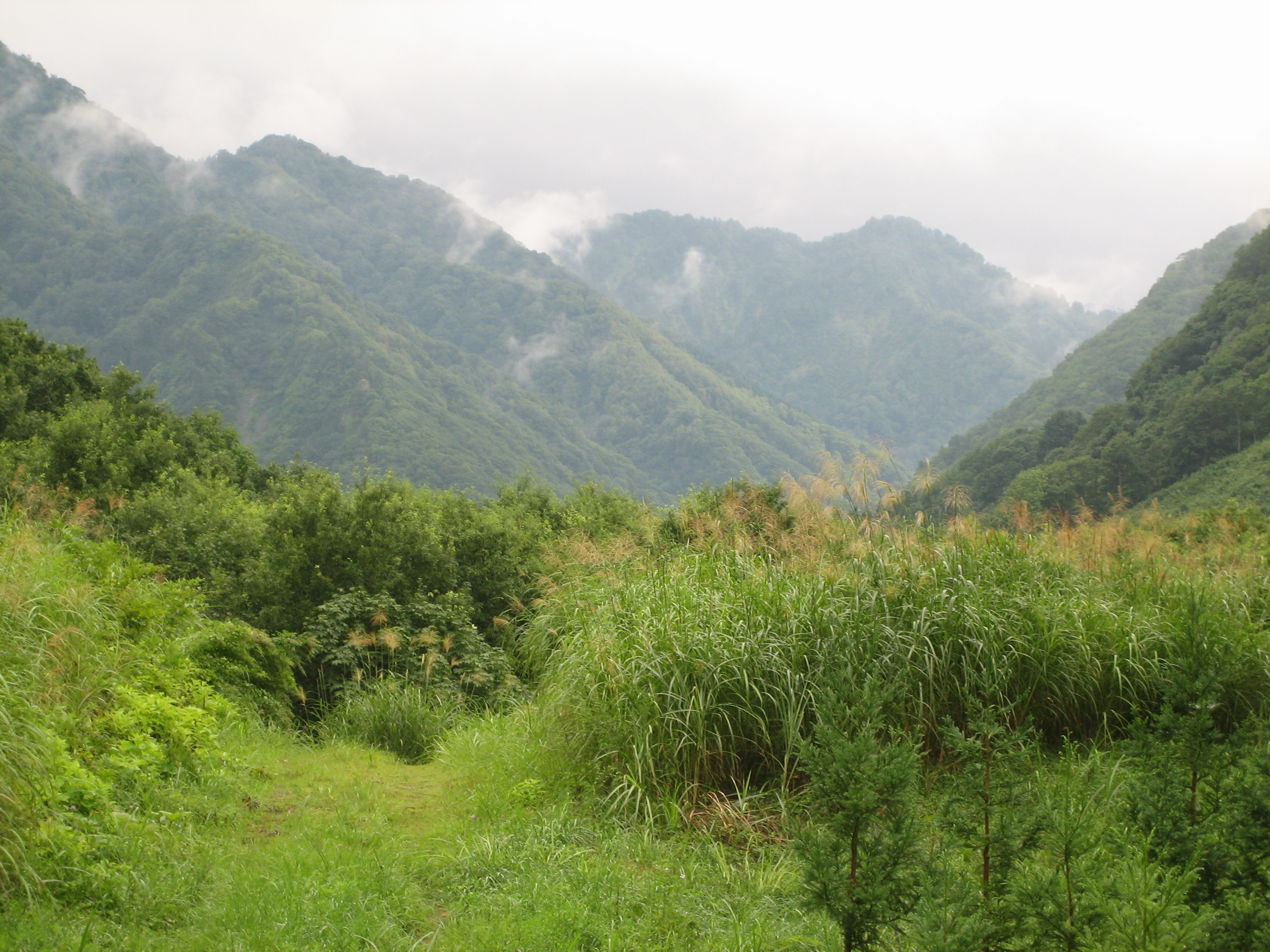
A cloudy day in Jinego, Chokai.

In 2003, the town had an estimated population of 6,359 and a density of 19.72 persons per km^{2}. The total area is 322.53 km^{2}. The town is named for the nearby Mount Chōkai which is on the boundary of Akita Prefecture and Yamagata Prefecture, southwest of town.

On March 22, 2005, Chōkai, along with the city of Honjō; and the towns of Higashiyuri, Iwaki, Nishime, Ōuchi, Yashima and Yuri (all from Yuri District), merged to create the city of Yurihonjō.

Chōkai contains several villages, including Jinego (上笹子; Kami-Jinego), Fushimi (伏見), Kawauchi (上川内; Kami-Kawauchi), and Hitane (上直根; Kami-Hitane). Highway 108 is the town's largest highway, connecting to Yuri and Honjō in the NW and Highway 13 in the SE.

There are two rivers in Chōkai -- Koyoshi River and Jinego River.

== History ==
- On March 31, 1955, the villages of Kawauchi, Hitane, and Jinego merged to form the village Chōkai.
- On November 1, 1980, Chōkai became a town.
- On March 22, 2005, the city of Honjō merged with the towns of Iwaki, Ouchi, Yuri, Nishime, Higashi-Yuri, Yashima, and Chōkai to form the city Yurihonjō.

== Schools ==
- Chōkai Junior High School.
- Chōkai Elementary School (consolidated from Hitane, Jinego, and Kawauchi Elementary Schools in 2014).
