= Ōuchi, Akita =

Dissolved municipality in Akita prefecture, Japan

Ōuchi (大内町, Ōuchi-machi) was a town located in Yuri District, Akita Prefecture, Japan.

In 2003, the town had an estimated population of 9,368 and a density of 51.55 persons per km^{2}. The total area was 181.71 km^{2}.

On March 22, 2005, Ōuchi, along with the city of Honjō; and the towns of Chōkai, Higashiyuri, Iwaki, Nishime, Yashima and Yuri (all from Yuri District), merged to create the city of Yurihonjō.

== Education ==
- Dewa Junior High School (出羽中学校) is a public school located in the Ōuchi town. (140 students, 2008)
- Ōuchi Junior High School (大内中学校) is a public school located 15 minutes drive east of Ōuchi town. (111 students, 2008)
- Iwaya Elementary School (岩谷小学校) (218 students, 2008)
- Shimokawa Elementary School (下川小学校) (118 students, 2008)
- Kamikawa Elementary School (上川小学校) (82 students, 2008)
