= Yashima, Akita =

Dissolved municipality in Akita prefecture, Japan

Yashima (矢島町, Yashima-machi) was a town located in Yuri District, Akita Prefecture, Japan.

In 2003, the town had an estimated population of 5,880 and a density of 47.56 persons per km^{2}. The total area was 123.63 km^{2}.

On March 22, 2005, Yashima, along with the city of Honjō; and the towns of Chōkai, Higashiyuri, Iwaki, Nishime, Ōuchi and Yuri (all from Yuri District), merged to create the city of Yurihonjō.
