= Konoura, Akita =

Dissolved municipality in Akita prefecture, Japan

Konoura (金浦町, Konoura-machi) was a town located in Yuri District, Akita Prefecture, Japan.

In 2003, the town had an estimated population of 5,011 and a density of 277.16 persons per km^{2}. The total area was 18.08 km^{2}.

On October 1, 2005, Konoura, along with the town of Kisakata, was merged into the town of Nikaho (all from Yuri District) to become the city of Nikaho.
