= Kisakata, Akita =

Town Yuri District, Akita Prefecture, Japan

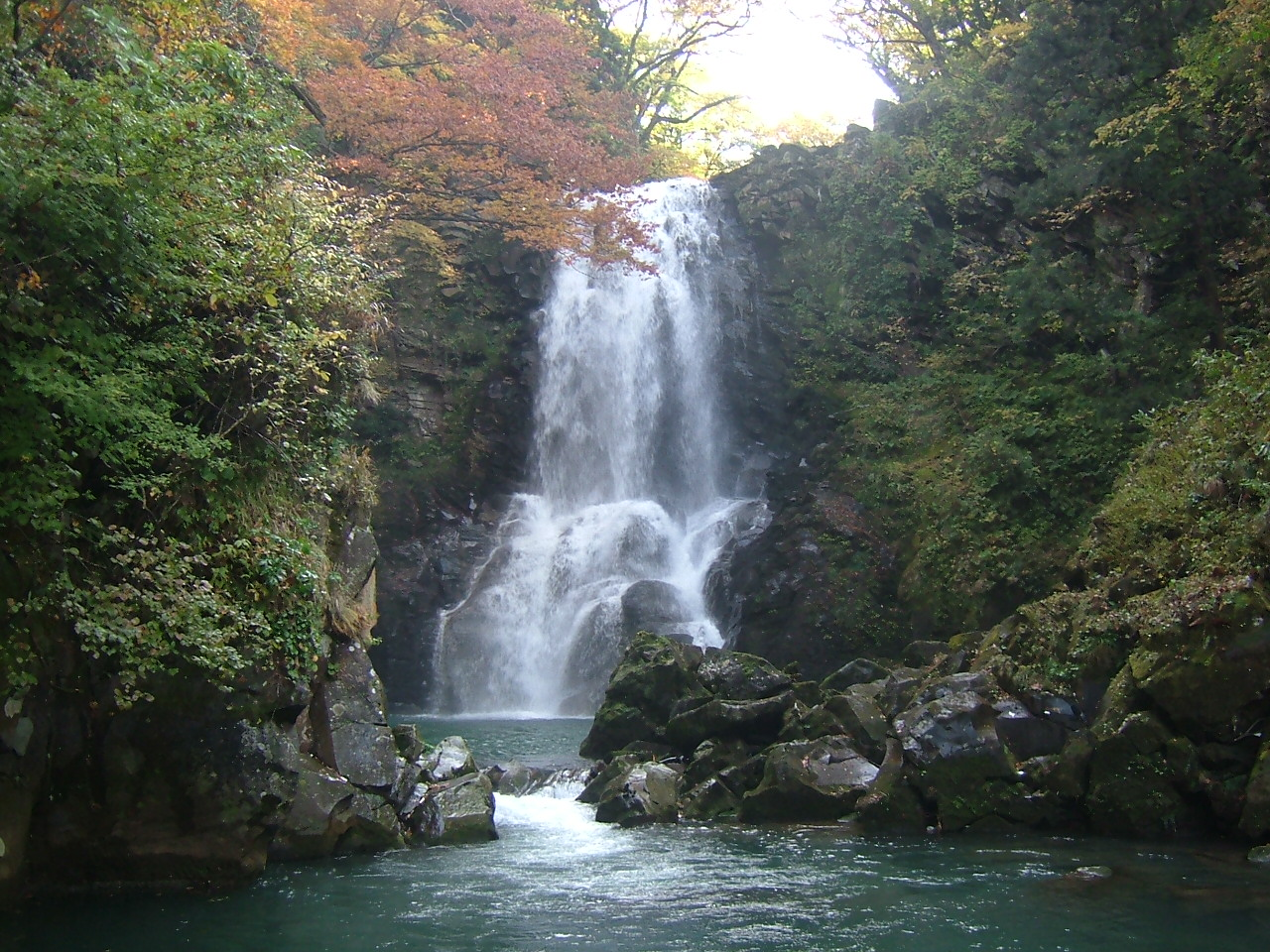
The Naso no Shirataki waterfall in Kisakata.

Kisakata (象潟町, Kisakata-machi) was a town located in Yuri District, Akita Prefecture, Japan.

In 2003, the town had an estimated population of 12,836 and a density of 103.50 persons per km^{2}. The total area was 124.02 km^{2}.

On October 1, 2005, Kisakata, along with the town of Konoura, was merged into the town of Nikaho (all from Yuri District) to become the city of Nikaho.

The poet Bashō visited Kisakata as part of his 1689 travels in Honshū, and composed a famous waka about Kisakata's islands. However, an eruption of Mount Chōkai and Kisakata earthquake in 1804 caused the sea bed to rise, and the islands are now surrounded by land, not water. There is a statue of Bashō at the Kanman Temple, which he visited.

For hikers and climbers Kisakata is the jumping-off point for trips to Mount Chōkai. There are also a number of picturesque waterfalls, including the Naso no Shirataki (奈曽の白滝) and the Mototaki (元滝).
