= Akira Komatsu =

Japanese footballer

Personal information
- Full name: Akira Komatsu
- Date of birth: 3 April 1962 (age 64)
- Place of birth: Yuri, Akita, Japan
- Position: Striker

Youth career
- 1975–1977: Yuri Junior High School
- 1978–1980: Nishime Nogyo High School

Senior career*
Years	Team	Apps	(Gls)
1981–1990	Yanmar Diesel	58	(11)
1990–1992	Kyoto Shiko	28	(6)

International career
1980-1981	Japan U-19	5	(8)
1981	Japan	1	(0)
- * Club domestic league appearances and goals

Akira Komatsu (小松 晃, Komatsu Akira; born 3 April 1962) is a former Japanese football player.

== Playing career ==
=== High school ===
He played in the 59th All Japan High School Soccer Tournament in 1981 as a striker scoring a goal from 50 metres for Akita Nishime High School.

=== Club ===
He played nine seasons for Yanmar Diesel from 1981 to 1990 in the first division of the Japan Soccer League - then the top flight of football in Japan. This was followed by two seasons at Kyoto Sanga F.C. in the second division.

=== International career ===
In early 1981, he played in the 1980 AFC Youth Championship, following the December 1980 qualifying, where combined he scored 8 goals in 5 games. He got his first senior cap with the Japan national football team on January 30, 1981 against a young Poland, entering at the 62nd minute.

== Coaching career ==
In 2006 he was a coach with the Vissel Kobe youth (U-18) team. From 2006 to 2011 he was the director of the soccer program with Kobe Gakuin University, affiliated with Vissel Kobe, until he was dismissed after an incident when he caught five players drinking, and kicked two of them.

Since 2013 he has been the coach at Meitoku Gijuku High School in Kōchi Prefecture, participating in the 92nd through 95th All Japan High School Soccer Tournament in the mid-2010s. He has also been the director of the Hirakata FC U-18 team.

== Legacy ==
On August 11, 2019, Akira Komatsu was featured in an episode of the Tokyo Broadcasting System Television series Disappeared Genius.

== Personal ==
His younger brother, Tsutomu Komatsu ( 小松勉 ), is a former manager of the TDK Soccer Club. He served for the blue Nikaho team for nine years as a bench boss.
