= 2011 Shizuoka earthquake =

Earthquake in Japan

- 静岡県東部地震
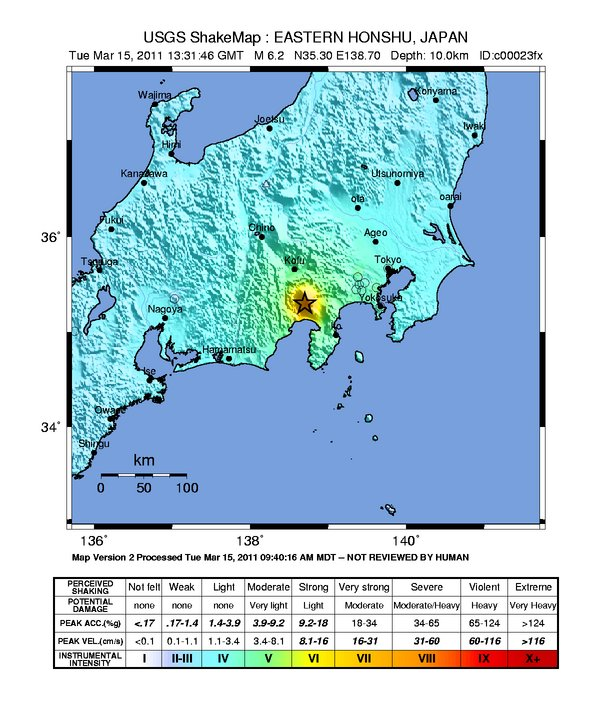

- Location within Shizuoka Prefecture
- UTC time: 2011-03-15 13:31:46
- ISC event: 16318259
- USGS-ANSS: ComCat
- Local date: 15 March 2011
- Local time: 22:31:46
- Magnitude: 6.0 M_{w}
- Depth: 9 km (5.6 mi)
- Epicenter: 35.3°N 138.7°E
- Type: Strike-slip
- Max. intensity: MMI VIII (Severe) JMA 6+
- Peak acceleration: 1.1 g
- Casualties: 80 injured

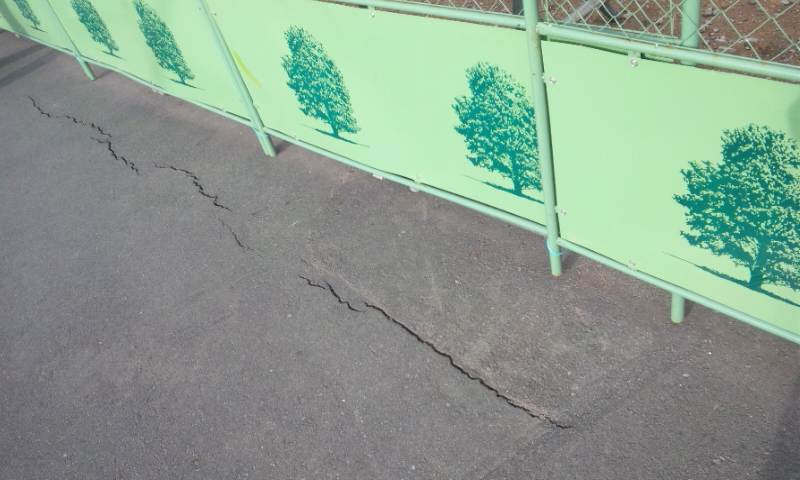
A cracked road in Kannami, Shizuoka, caused by the earthquake

The 2011 Shizuoka earthquake (静岡県東部地震, Shizuoka-ken Tōbu jishin) occurred approximately 42 km (26 mi) north-northeast of Shizuoka City at 22:31 JST, 15 March 2011. The magnitude was M_{w} 6.0 or M_{JMA} 6.4, and the depth was 9 km (5.6 mi). The hypocenter of this earthquake is thought to have been near the presumed location of the magma chamber of Mount Fuji. It may have been a triggered earthquake caused by the Tohoku earthquake, which occurred four days earlier, on 11 March 2011. It was sinistral strike-slip fault earthquake. It had a maximum JMA intensity of Shindo 6+ (Fujinomiya) or VIII (Severe) on the Mercalli intensity scale. The earthquake left 80 people injured, and caused some power outages.

== See also ==
- List of earthquakes in 2011
- List of earthquakes in Japan
