= Honjō, Akita =

City in Akita Prefecture, Japan

Honjō (本荘市, Honjō-shi) was a city located in Akita Prefecture, Japan. Currently, Honjo is a part of Yurihonjō, which the city was dissolved on March 22, 2005.

== History ==
Honjō 本荘市
- Former City
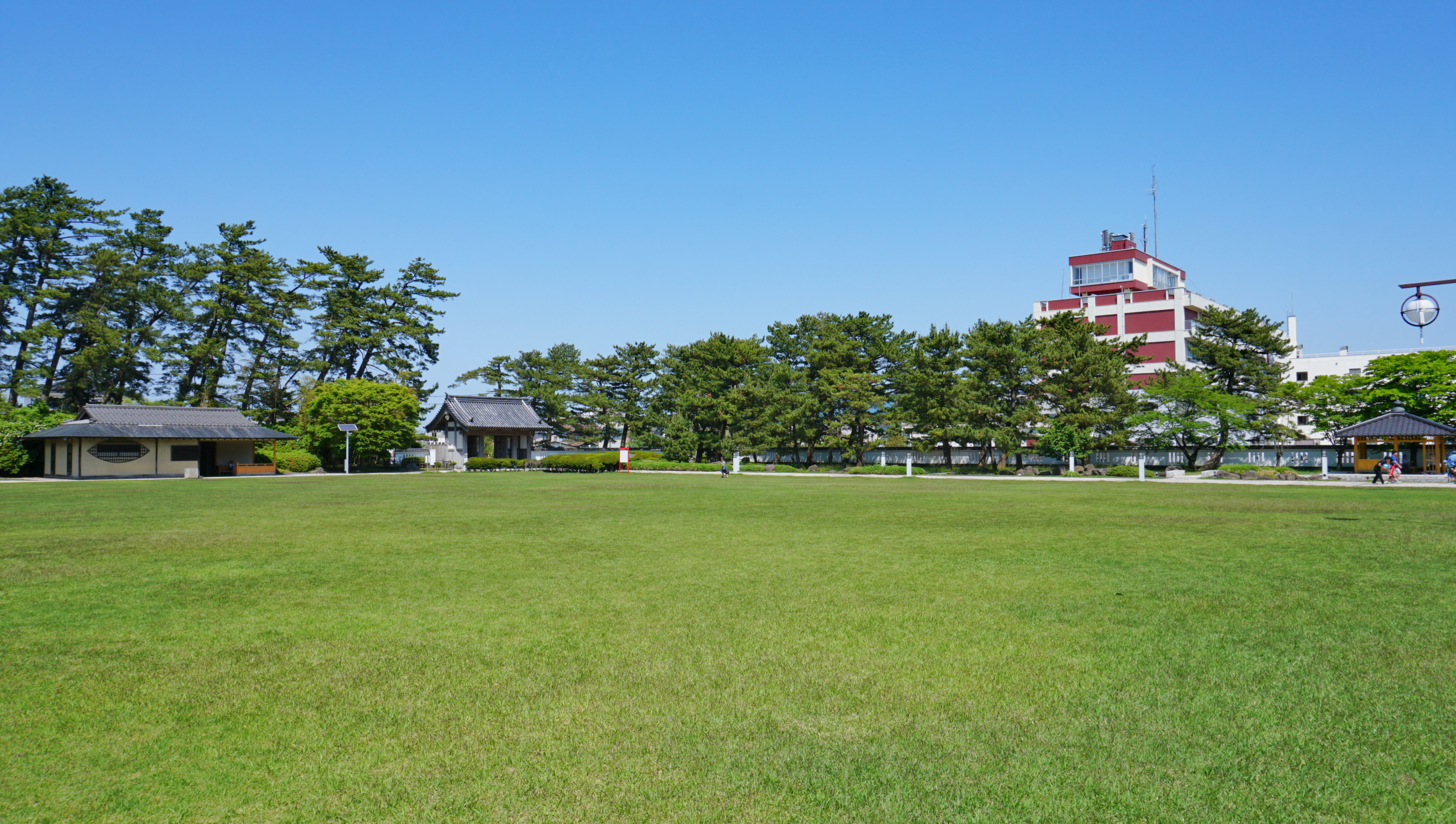
- Otemon Square of Honjo Park

- Flag Emblem

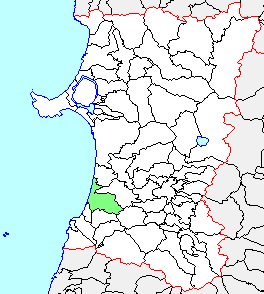
- Location of Honjō in Akita Prefecture

- Location within Japan
- Country: Japan
- Region: Tōhoku
- Prefecture: Akita Prefecture
- District: Yuri District

Area
  - Total: 188.30 km^{2} (72.70 sq mi)

Population (2005)
  - Total: 45,429
- Time zone: UTC+9 (Japan Standard Time)
- Merged into: Yurihonjō

=== Establishment ===
Honjo was established on March 31, 1954 when the village of Koyoshi, Otomo, Ishizawa, Minamiuchikoshi, Kitauchikoshi, and Matsugasaki in Yuri Country merged into Honjo City

=== Dissolvement ===
On March 22, 2005, Honjō, along with the towns of Chōkai, Higashiyuri, Iwaki, Nishime, Ōuchi, Yashima and Yuri (all from Yuri District), merged to create the city of Yurihonjō.

== Geography ==
=== Land Area ===
The total area was 188.30 km².

=== Populations ===
In 2003, the city had an estimated population of 45,580 and the density of 242.05 persons per km².
