= 1828 Sanjō earthquake =

Earthquake in Japan

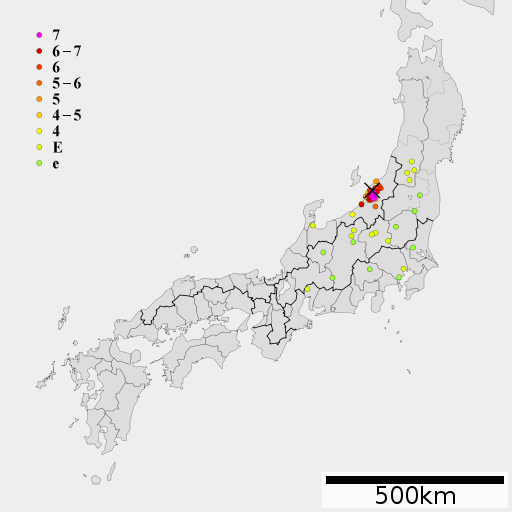
1828 Sanjō earthquake intensity

The 1828 Sanjō earthquake (Japanese: 三条地震) occurred on December 18, 1828 at Sanjo, Niigata Prefecture (then Echigo Province) in Japan. According to the official report, 21,134 houses and buildings were damaged, and 1,204 of them burned down. There were around 1,450 casualties.

== Overview ==
- Date : December 18, 1828
- Magnitude : 6.9 M_{K}
- Epicenter : 37.6°N 138.9°E
- Death toll : 1,559 (official confirmed)
