= 1939 Oga earthquake =

- 男鹿地震
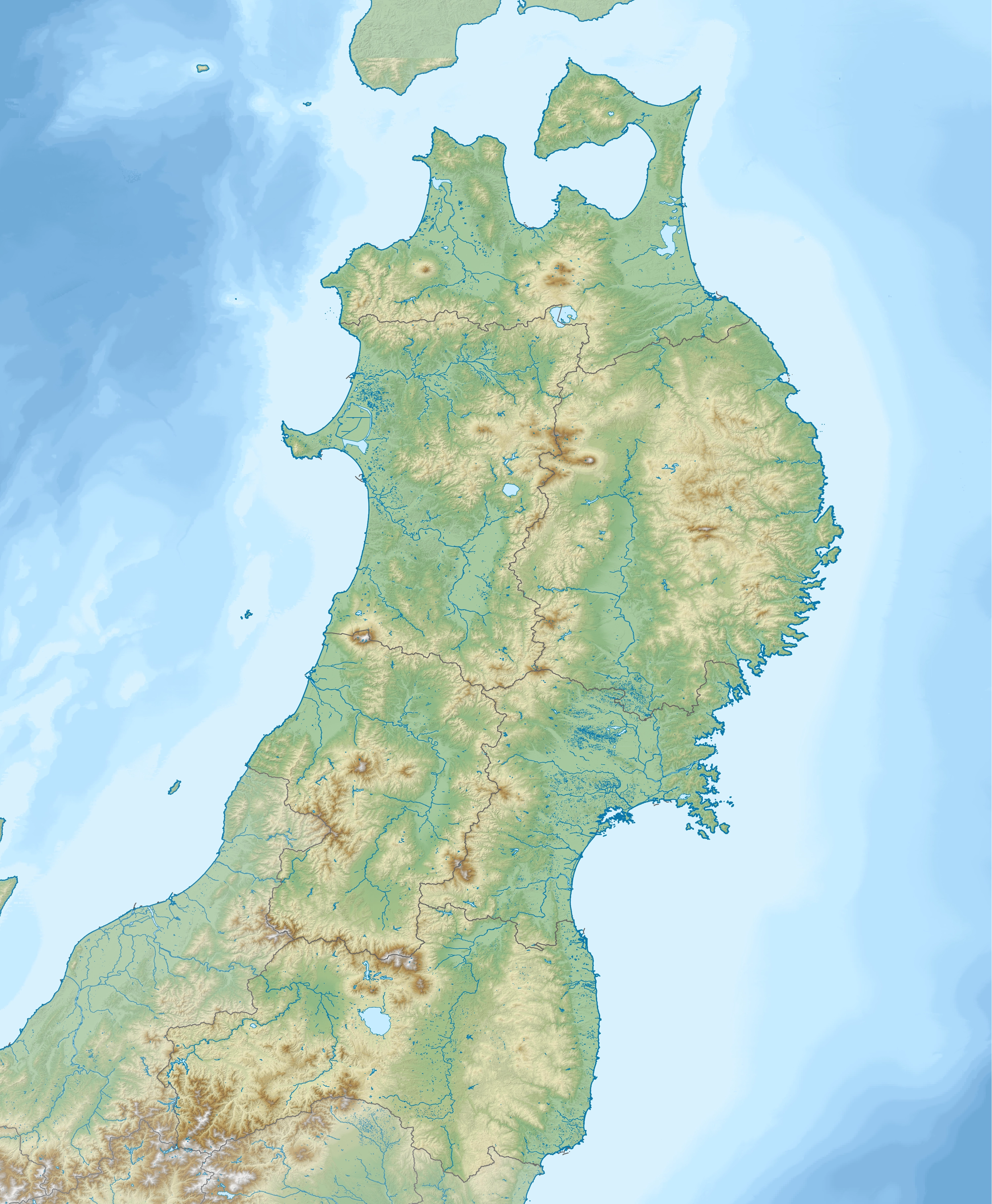
- Location within Tohoku, Japan Location within Akita Prefecture
- UTC time: 1939-05-01 05:58:30
- ISC event: 901919
- 901923
- USGS-ANSS: ComCat
- ComCat
- Local date: May 1, 1939
- Local time: 14:58 (JST)
- Magnitude: M_{JMA} 6.8; M_{w} 7.0
- Epicenter: 39.9°N 139.7°E
- Casualties: 27 dead, 52 injured

The 1939 Oga earthquake (Japanese: 男鹿地震) struck Akita Prefecture, Japan on May 1, 1939. This event was a doublet earthquake, in which the mainshock occurred at 14:58 (JST), M_{JMA} 6.8 (M_{w} 7.0), and an aftershock at 15:00 (JST), M_{JMA} 6.7 (M_{w} 6.5). The earthquake left 27 people dead and 52 people injured, and 479 homes were destroyed.
