= 1804 Kisakata earthquake =

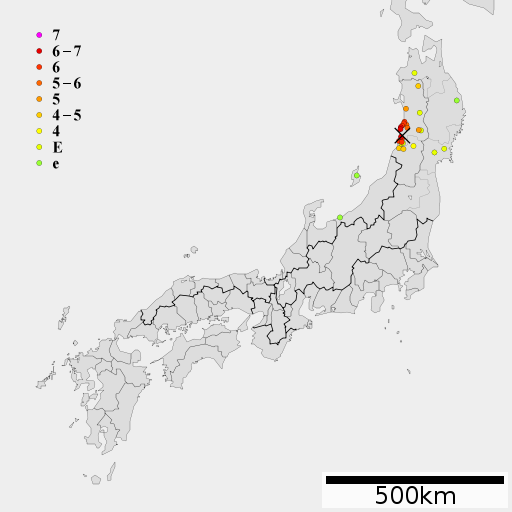

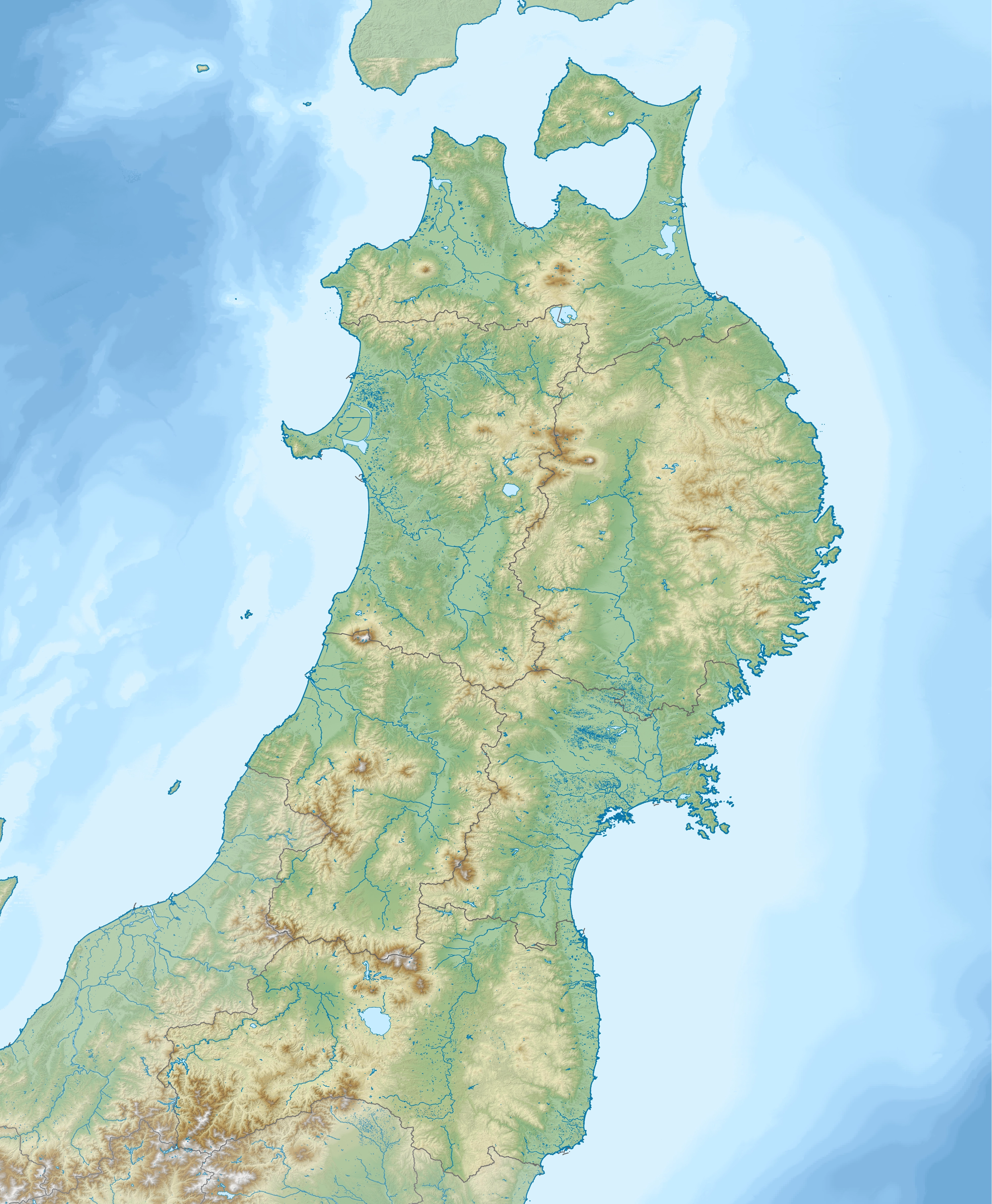
- Location within Tohoku, Japan
- Local date: July 10, 1804; 222 years ago
- Magnitude: M7.0
- Epicenter: 39.05°N 139.95°E
- Casualties: 300–500 fatalities

The 1804 Kisakata earthquake (Japanese: 象潟地震) struck Dewa Province, Japan on July 10, 1804 with a magnitude of 7.0. The earthquake killed approximately 300–500 people. Nearby Mount Chokai erupted at about the same time as the earthquake. Lake Kisakata was uplifted by the earthquake, so Kisakata, featured in Bashō's Oku no Hosomichi, became new land and a swamp. A 1 m (3 ft 3 in) tsunami flooded 300 homes in Kisakata and Sakata.

== See also ==
- Kisakata
- Mount Chokai
