= Yuri District, Akita =

Former district in Akita prefecture, Japan

Coordinates: 39°23′6″N 140°02′51″E

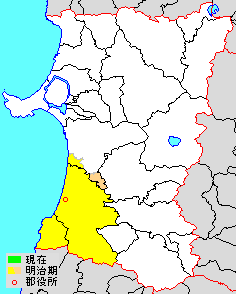
Location of former Yuri District in Akita Prefecture

Yuri District (由利郡, Yuri-gun) was a rural district located in southern Akita Prefecture, Japan.

On October 1, 2005, the towns of Kisakata, Konoura and Nikaho were merged to create the city of Nikaho. Therefore, Yuri District was dissolved as a result of this merger.

== History ==
The area of Yuri Distinct was formerly part of Dewa Province, which was divided into the provinces of Ugo Province and Uzen Province following the Meiji restoration on January 19, 1869, with the area of Yuri becoming part of Ugo Province. At the time, the area consisted of one town and 101 villages formerly under the control of Honjō Domain, one town and 70 villages formerly under the control of Kameda Domain, 45 villages formerly under the control of Yashima Domain, 9 villages that were tenryō territory directly administered by the Tokugawa shogunate, and 4 villages under the control of hatamoto retainers of Honjō Domain and Yashima Domain. Akita Prefecture was founded on December 13, 1871.

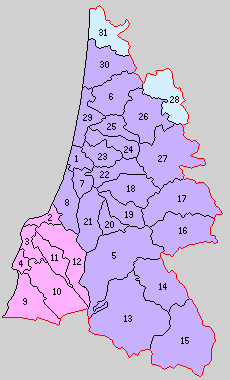
Historic Map of Yuri District: Blue - Yurihonjō-shi: 1. Honjō; 5. Yashima; 6. Kameda; 7. Koyoshi; 8. Nishime; 13. Hitane; 14. Kawauchi; 15. Sasagō; 16. Taomai; 17. Shimogō; 18. Ishizawa; 19. Higashi-Taki; 20. Nishi-Taki; 21. Ayukawa; 22. Otomo; 23. Minami-Utetsu; 24. Kita-Utetsu; 25. Iwaya; 26. Shimo-Kawaōchi; 27. Kami-Kawaōchi; 29. Michikawa; 30. Matsugasaki; Pink - Nikaho-shi: 2. Hirasawa; 3. Konoura; 4. Shiokoshi; 9. Kamihama; 10. Kamigō; 11. Koide; 12. Innai; Light Blue - to others: 28. Daishoji (now part of Akita-shi); 31. Shimohama (now part of Akita-shi)

With the establishment of the municipality system on December 23, 1878, Yuri District, with three towns (Honjō, Kameda and Yashima) and 28 villages was established.

- Kisakata was raised to town status on September 30, 1896, followed by Konoura and Hirasawa on June 4, 1902.
- The city of Honjō was established on March 31, 1954, and the towns of Nikaho and Iwaki were established in 1956.
- On November 1, 1960, the village of Yuri gained town status, followed by Ōuchi on April 1, 1970, Higashiyuri on April 1, 1974, Nishime on September 1, 1975, and Chōkai on November 1, 1980.
- On March 22, 2005, the towns of Chōkai, Higashiyuri, Iwaki, Nishime, Ōuchi, Yashima and Yuri were merged with the city of Honjō to create the city of Yurihonjō.
- On October 1, 2005, the towns of Kisakata, Konoura and Nikaho were merged to create the city of Nikaho. Therefore, Yuri District was dissolved as a result of this merger.
