= Remotely triggered earthquakes =

Geographical phenomenon

Remotely triggered earthquakes are a result of the effects of large earthquakes at considerable distance, outside of the immediate aftershock zone. The further one gets from the initiating earthquake in both space and time, the more difficult it is to establish an association.

The physics of triggering an earthquake are complex. Most earthquake-generating zones are in a state of being close to failure. If such a zone were to be left completely alone, it would generate significant earthquakes spontaneously. Remote earthquakes, however, are in a position to disturb this critical state, either by shifting the stresses statically, or by dynamic change caused by passing seismic waves.

The first type of triggering may be due to static changes in the critical state. For example, after the magnitude 7.3 Landers earthquake struck California in 1992, it is said that "the earthquake map of California lit up like a Christmas tree". This event reinforced the idea of remotely triggered earthquakes, and pushed the hypothesis into the scientific mainstream. Following the 2004 Indian Ocean earthquake, it was established that remote earthquakes had been triggered as far away as Alaska.

There is scientific evidence for a "long reach", mainly in the form of discrete element modelling used in the mining industry. If rock is modeled as discrete elements in a critical state, a single disturbance can influence a wide area. A lower-scale example is when a small excavation in a valley triggers a landslide and brings down a whole mountainside.

== See also ==
- Fault mechanics
- Tectonic weapon
