= Iwaki, Akita =

Iwaki 岩城町
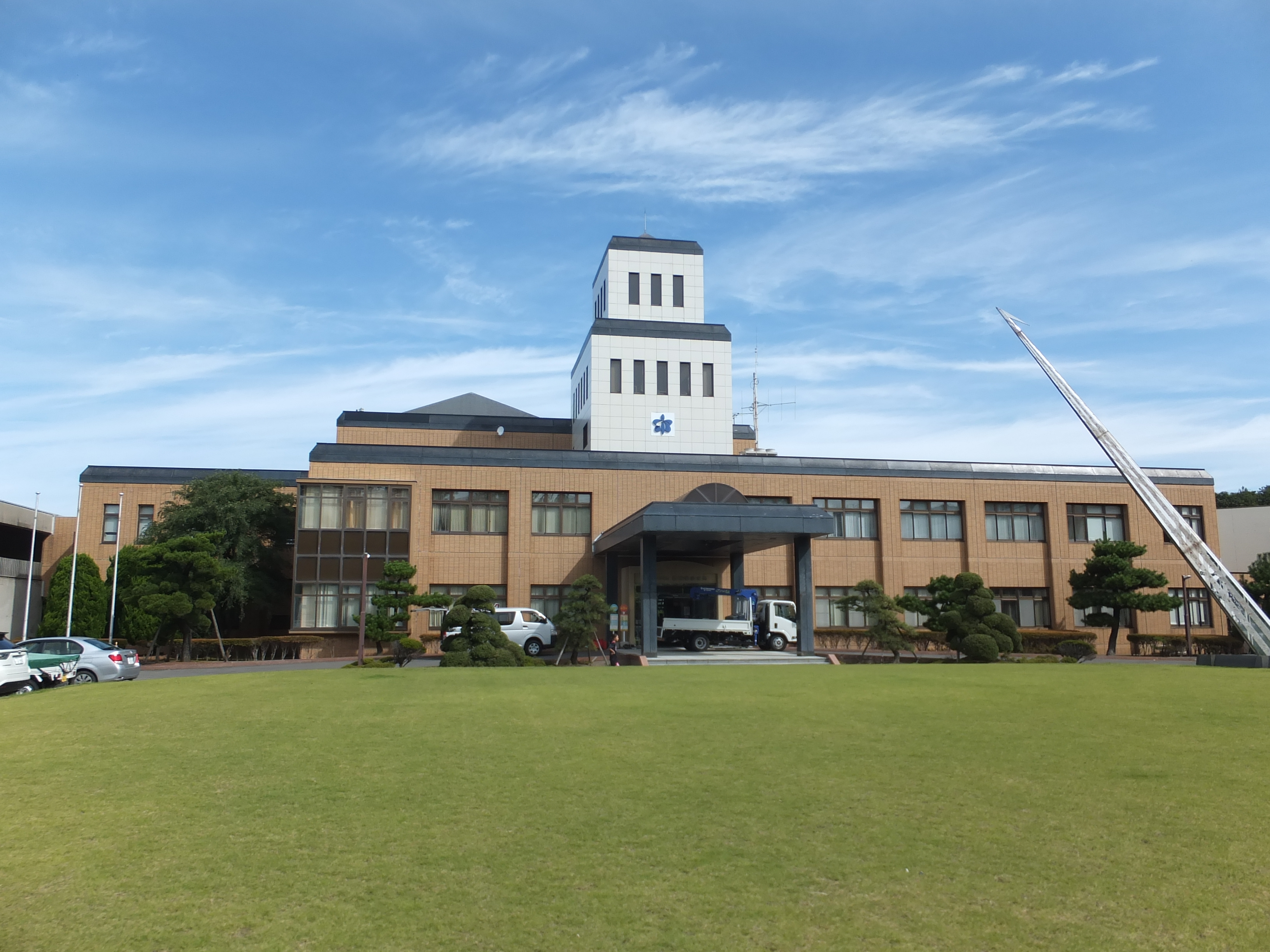
- Iwaki branch of the Yurihonjo City Hall

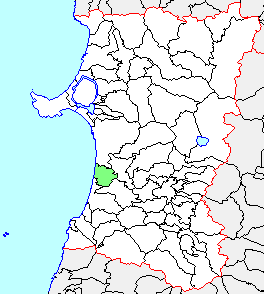
- Country: Japan
- Prefecture: Akita
- District: Yuri

Iwaki (岩城町, Iwaki-machi) was a town located in Yuri District, Akita Prefecture, Japan.

In 2003, the town had an estimated population of 6,413 and a density of 59.32 persons per km^{2}. The total area was 108.10 km^{2}.

On March 22, 2005, Iwaki, along with the city of Honjō; and the towns of Chōkai, Higashiyuri, Nishime, Ōuchi, Yashima and Yuri (all from Yuri District), merged to create the city of Yurihonjō.
