= Mount Chōkai =

Active volcano in the Tohoku region of Japan

- 鳥海山
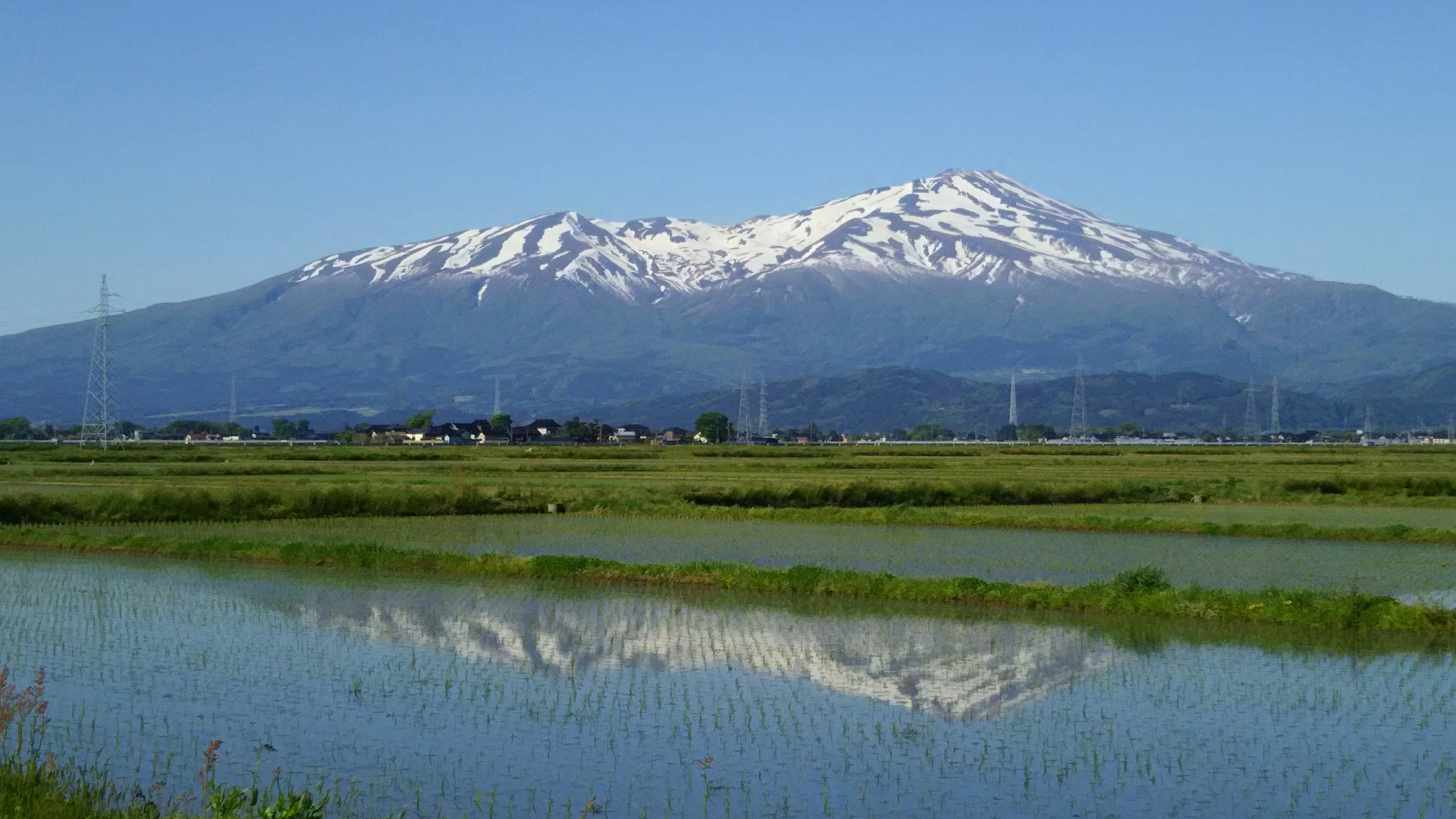
- As seen from the southwest

Highest point
- Elevation: 2,236 m (7,336 ft)
- Prominence: 1,891 m (6,204 ft)
- Listing: •100 famous mountains in Japan •Ultra •Ribu
- Coordinates: 39°05′57″N 140°02′56″E

Geography
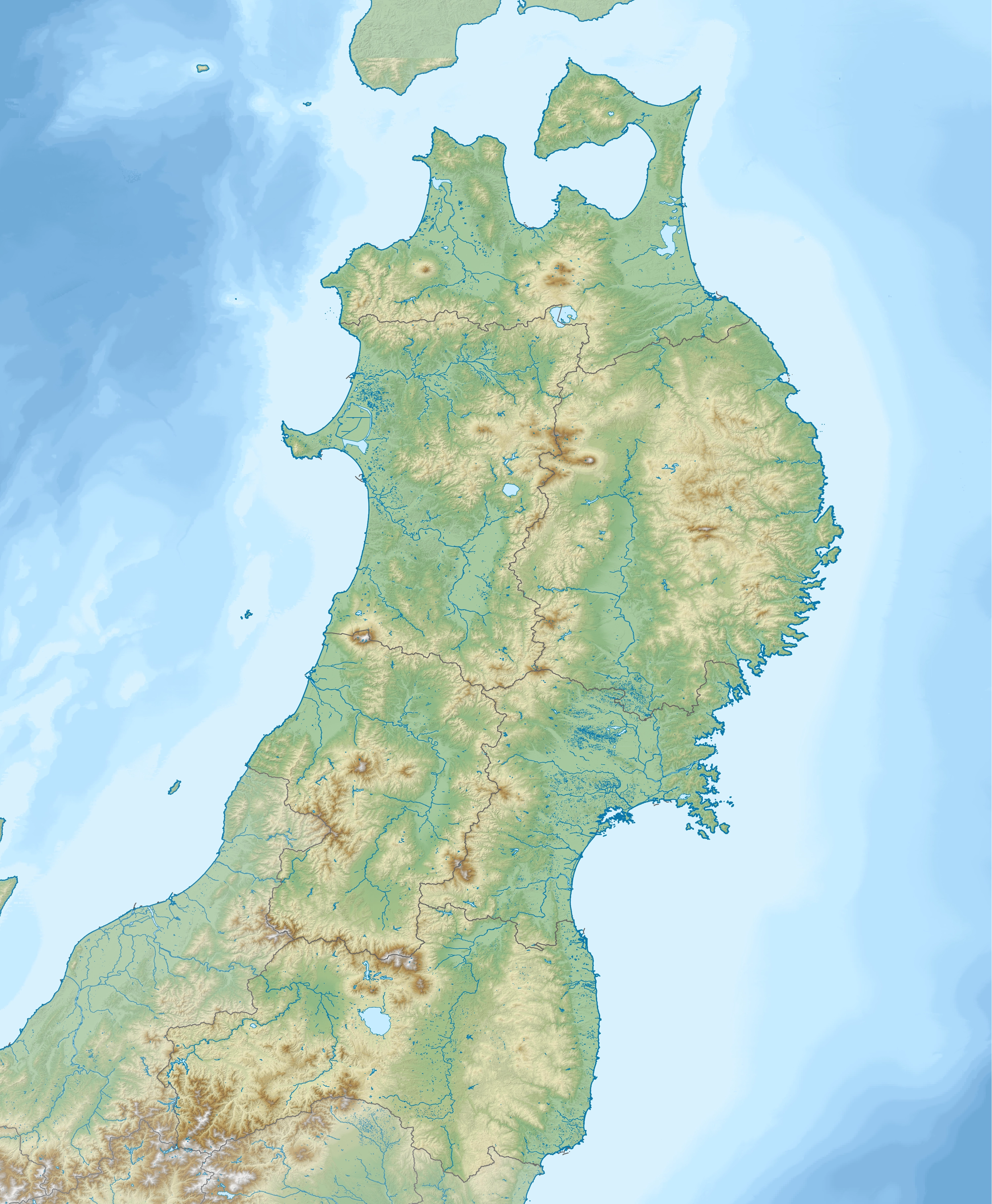
- Location within Tohoku, Japan
- Location: Yamagata and Akita, Tōhoku, Japan

Geology
- Mountain type: Stratovolcano
- Volcanic arc: Northeastern Japan Arc
- Last eruption: March to April 1974
- National Historic Site of Japan

Mount Chōkai (鳥海山, Chōkai-san or Chōkai-zan) is an active volcano located on the border of Akita and Yamagata in the Tōhoku region of Japan, and is 2,236 m (7,336 ft) tall. Because of its (roughly) symmetrical shape and massive size, it is also variously known as Dewa Fuji (出羽富士), Akita Fuji (秋田富士) or Shōnai Fuji (庄内富士) depending on the location of the viewer. In addition to being one of the 100 Famous Landscapes of Japan, it is also included as one of the 100 famous mountains in Japan, and famous 100 Geographical Features of Japan. It is surrounded by Chōkai Quasi-National Park. It is also a National Historic Site of Japan, and is regarded as a sacred mountain by followers of the Shugendō branch of Shinto which has the shrine Chōkaisan Ōmonoimi Shrine there and is popular with hikers.

== Outline ==
Mount Chōkai is a complex stratovolcano made of two old and new newer volcanoes, composed primarily of basalt or andesite.

Mount Chōkai is shared by two municipalities in Akita Prefecture and four municipalities Yamagata Prefecture; however, its peak is located in Yuza, on the Yamagata side of the border. It is therefore the highest peak in Yamagata, and the second highest in the Tōhoku region after Mt. Hiuchigatake (altitude 2,356 m). The highest elevation of Mount Chōkai within Akita Prefecture has an altitude of 1,775 meters, and thus the mountain is also the highest in Akita Prefecture. From the summit, it is possible to see the Shirakami Mountains and Mount Iwaki to the north, Sado Island to the south and the Pacific Ocean to the east.

On the south side of the mountain is “Shinji Sekkei,” where snow remains in the shape of the kanji for “heart” in even in summer, and portions of the summit have perennial snow, and geological evidence of glaciation in the recent past.

Indigenous species of Mount Chōkai include the butterfly thistle and butterfly fish.

== Eruptions ==
Mount Chōkai is a very active mountain. Known major eruptions occurred:

- 466 B.C. Causes massive collapse of mountain peak (based on dendrochronology)
- 810 AD Records of eruption continue to 824.
- 840 AD Eruption.
- 871 AD Eruption and lava flow with Volcanic explosion index: VEI 2
- 939 AD Eruption
- 1560 AD Eruption
- 1659-1663 AD Eruptions
- 1740-1741 AD Eruption
- 1800-1801 AD Steam explosion, lava flow, formation of a new lava dome: Eight people killed
- 1821 Eruption recorded.
- 1834 AD Eruption
- 1971 AD Eruption
- 1974 AD Steam explosion, small mud flow; Volcanic Explosion Index: VEI 1

== History ==
Mount Chōkai has been the object of mountain worship since ancient times. From the Heian period, it gradually became a training ground for Shugendō, as an avatar of Yakushi Nyorai. From the south was a pilgrimage path to the summit. In the middle of the Edo period the mountain drew many pilgrims and had 33 chapels at its base., with additional routes to its summit opened in the north. There is also a tradition that the island of Tobishima in the Sea of Japan was originally a part of the summit of Mount Chokai.

Omonoimi no Kami is the God of the mountain and worshipped at Chōkaisan Ōmonoimi Shrine.

Three ships have been named after Mount Chōkai: Chōkai, an early steam gunboat, and the cruiser Japanese cruiser Chōkai (sunk in 1944), which were both in the Imperial Japanese Navy, and the JDS Chōkai, a Kongō class guided missile destroyer currently in service in the Japan Maritime Self-Defense Force.

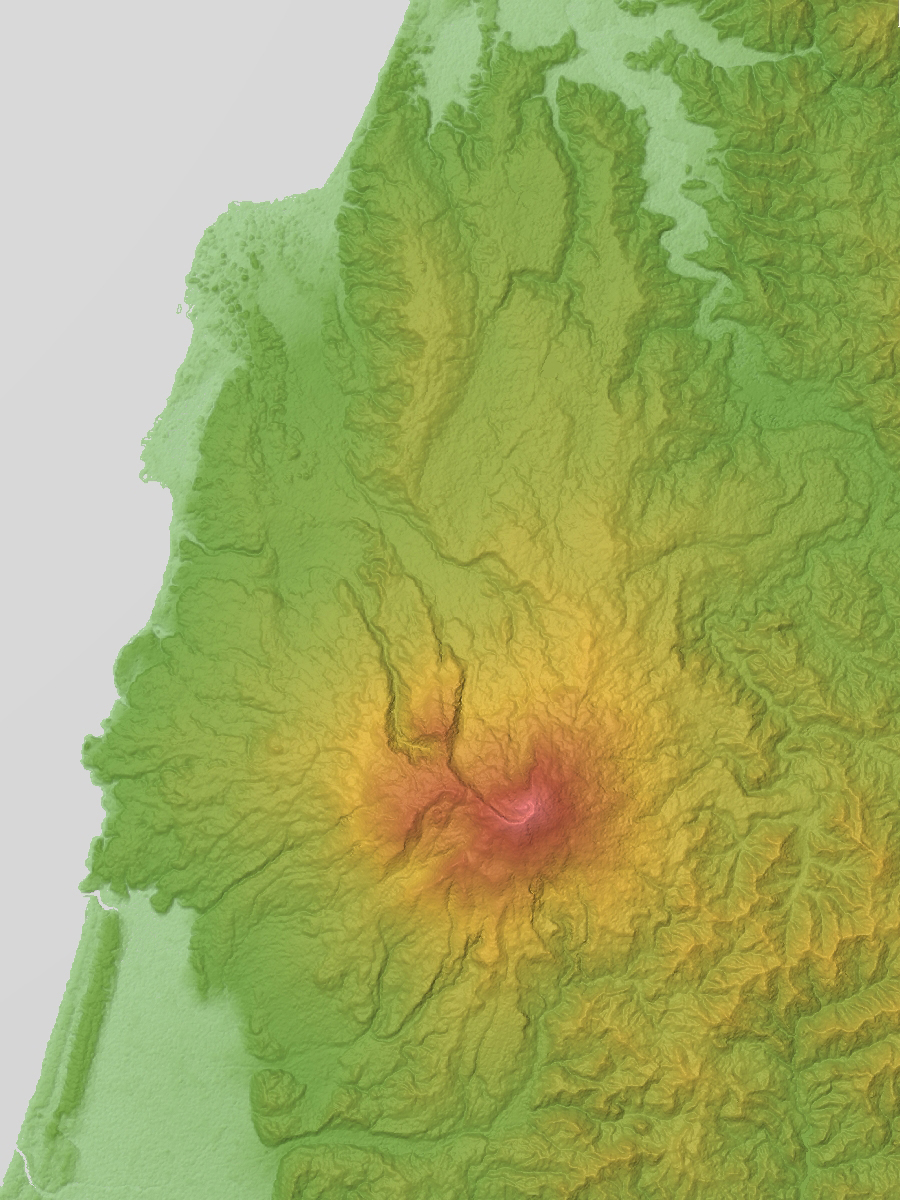
Chōkai volcano

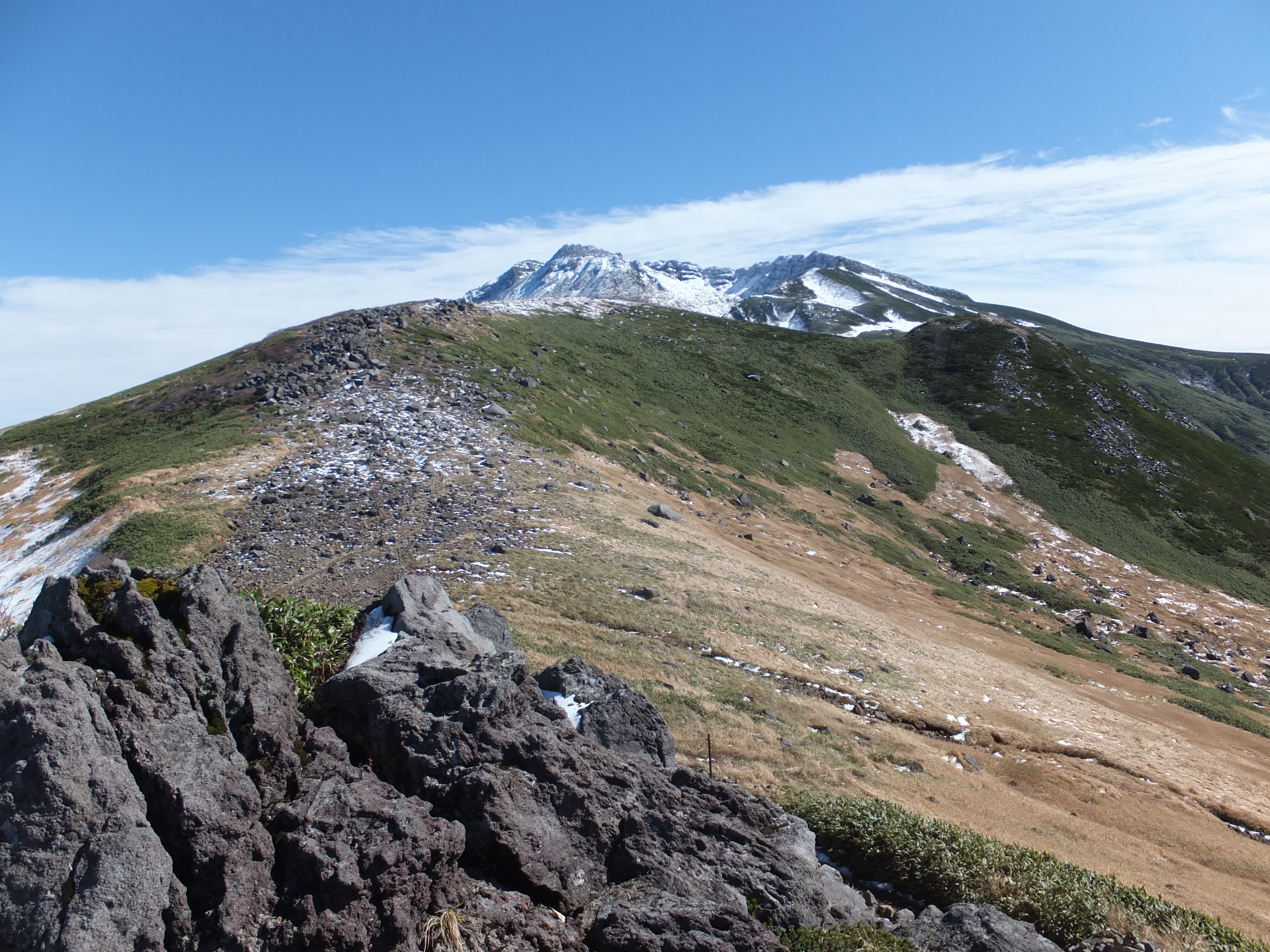
Ridge of the Mt. Chokai

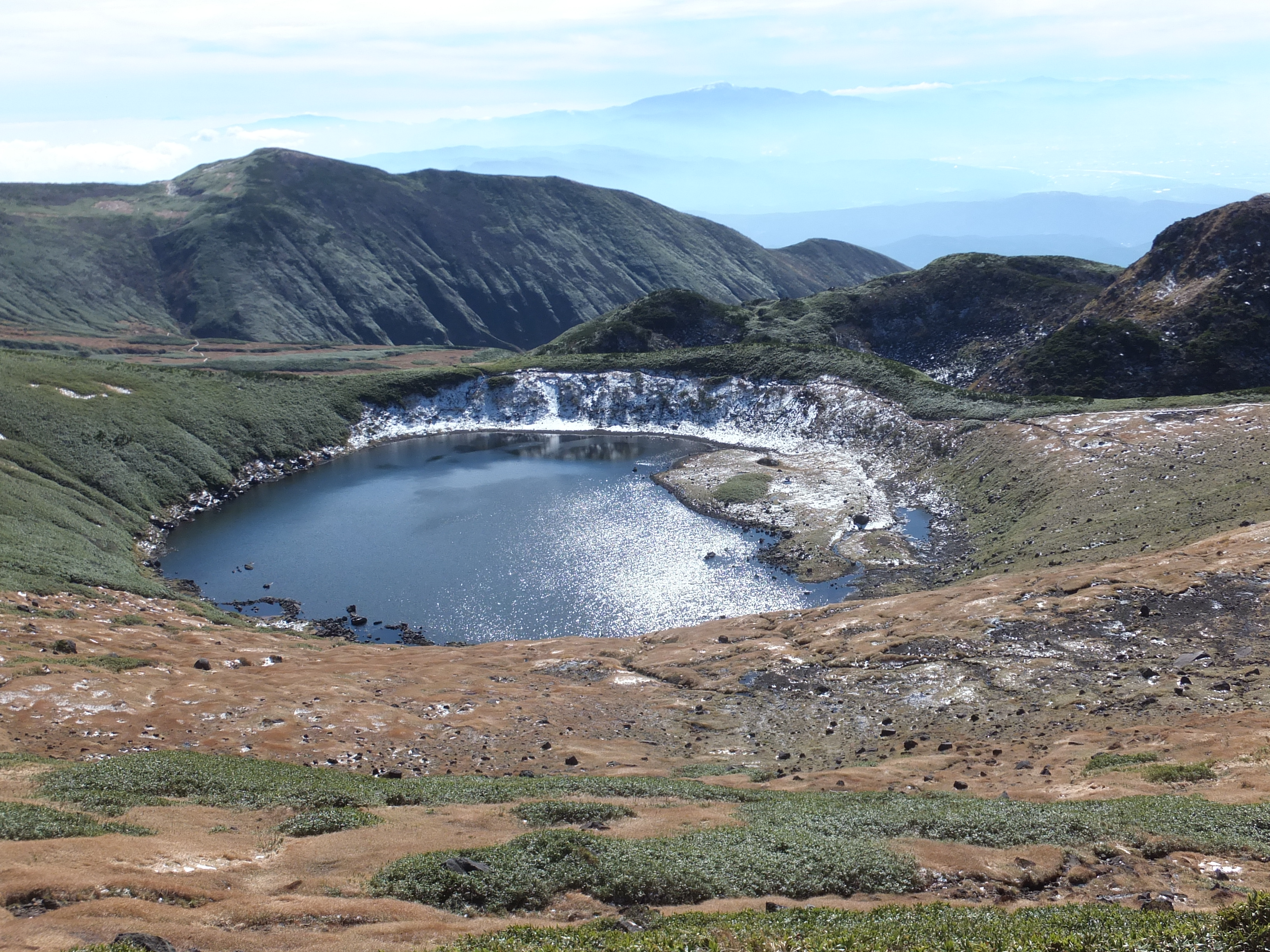
Lake Chokai

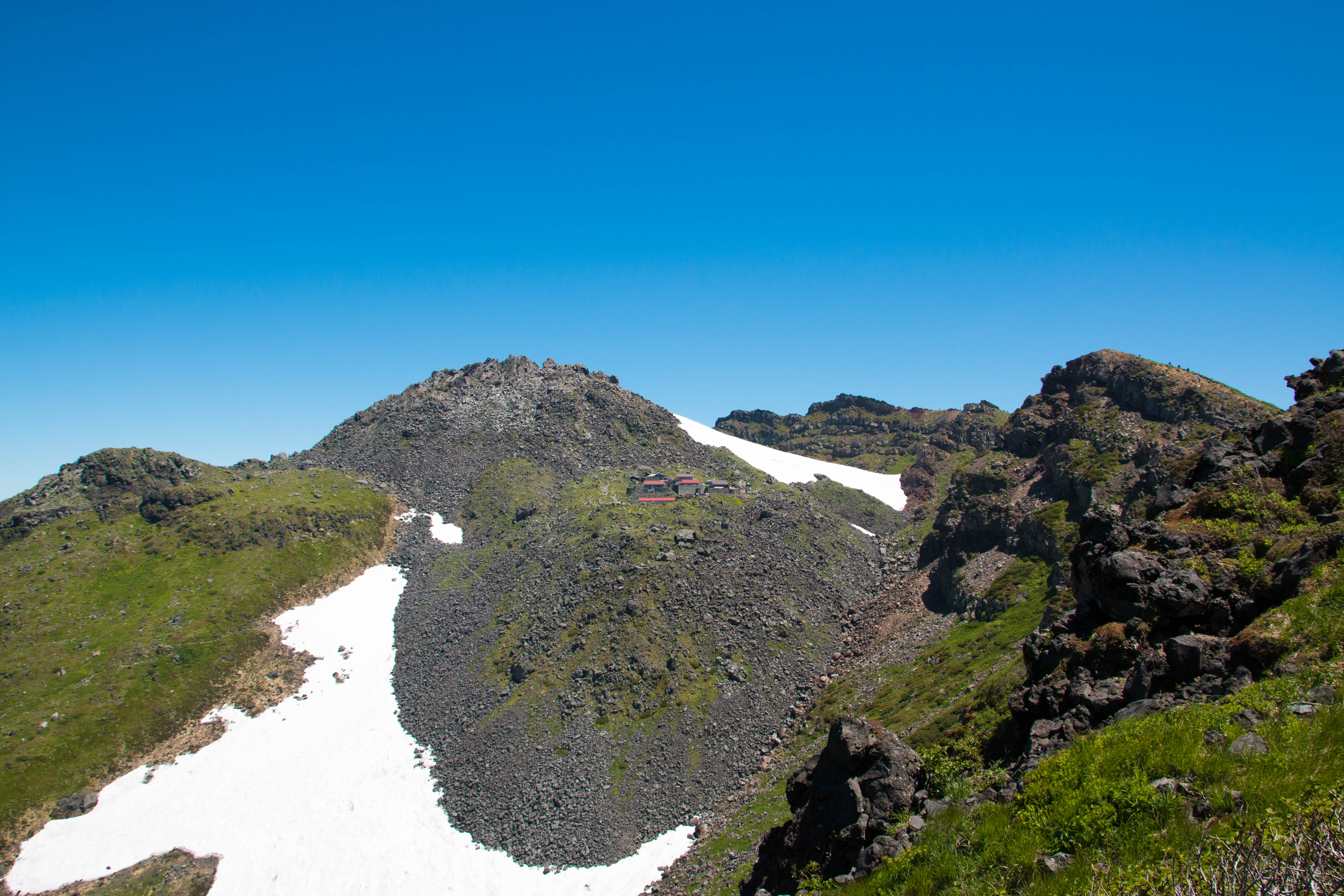
Lava dome on the summit

== See also ==
- List of volcanoes in Japan
