= Korfball in Catalonia =

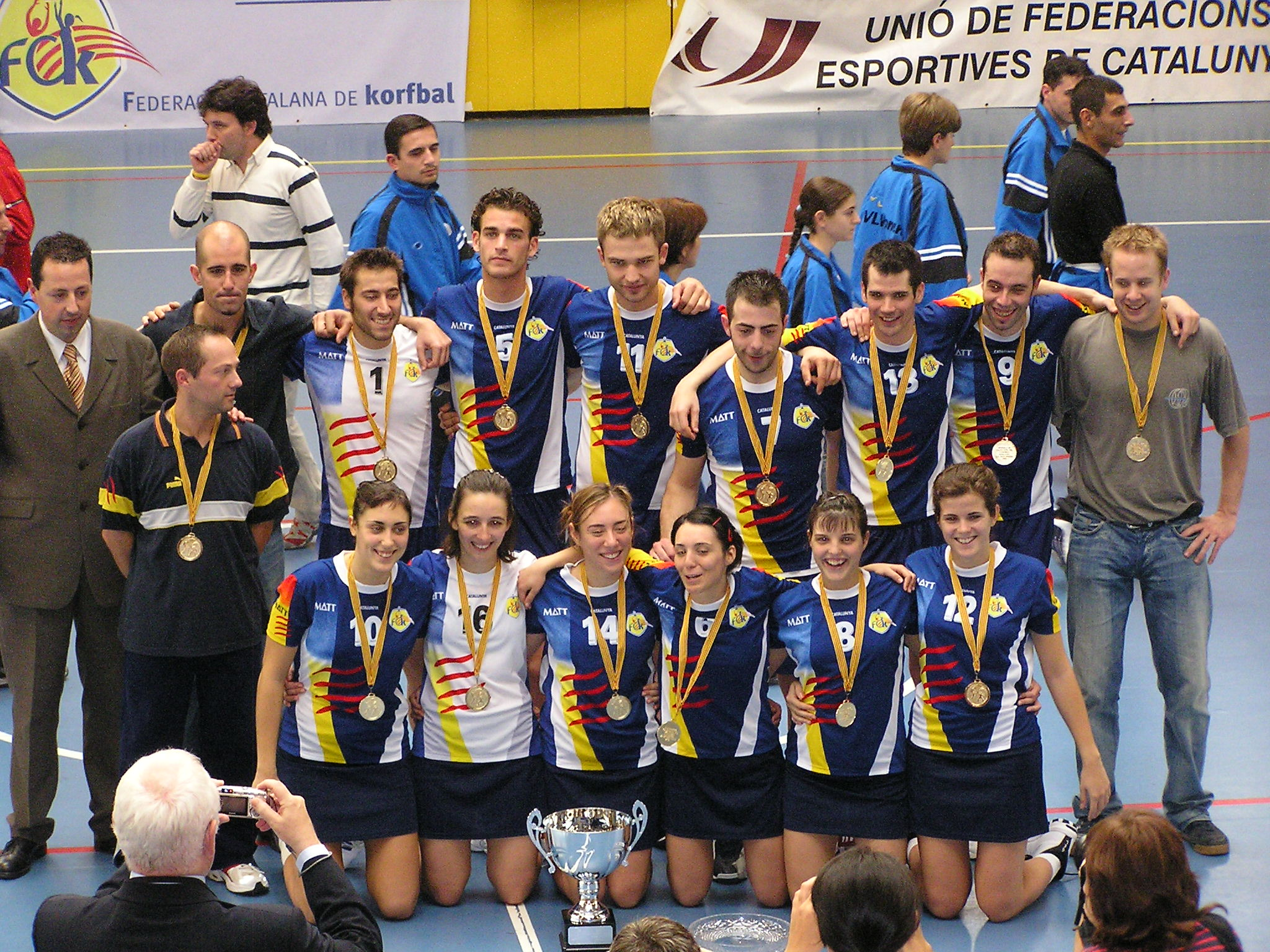
Catalonia, European Bowl 2005 champions

Korfball in Catalonia has been played since 1982, and is managed by the Catalan Korfball Federation (FCK). In 1997, the International Korfball Federation admitted the Catalan Korfball Federation as a provisional member, and finally in 2006 there was the full membership application.

== History ==
In 1980 the Catalan Korfball Section (Secció catalana de balonkorf) was created, and the first two teams were founded in two schools in Terrassa: Liceo Egara and Pere Viver. In 1985, the first division of the Catalan Korfball League (Lliga Catalana de corfbol) began, with the now-defunct Club Korfbal Egara'85 winning the inaugural season.

In 1982 the Catalan Association for the Promotion and Practice of Korfball (Associació Catalana per a la Promoció i Pràctica del Korfbal, ACPPK) was created, becoming the first official korfball association in Catalonia. In 1990, korfball was recognized by the General Secretariat of Sport of the Government of Catalonia (Secretaria General de l'Esport de la Generalitat de Catalunya). In 1997, the Catalonia national korfball team began international competition after being provisionally recognized by the International Korfball Federation (IKF) at its assembly in Lahti, Finland.

In 1999 the ACPPK transformed into the Catalan Korfball Union (Unió Catalana de Korfbal, UCK). This new association was granted provisional member status by the International Korfball Federation at the 1997 Lahti assembly. On 9 July 2004, the UCK became the Catalan Korfball Federation (Federació Catalana de Korfbal) in an assembly held at the Casa Alegre de Sagrera in Terrassa, with 24 founding entities. Full international recognition was achieved at the IKF assembly held in Terrassa on 29 October 2005. The Catalan Korfball Federation was the first Catalan federation of a sport recognized by the International Olympic Committee (IOC) to gain international recognition.

In October 2012 Barcelona hosted the U23 World Korfball Championship, the first IKF event held in Catalonia. That same year, the Catalan federation became a founding member of IKF Europe.

The main international achievements of the Catalan national team include winning the European Bowl in 2005, finishing fifth in the 2010 European Korfball Championship, fourth in the 2011 Korfball World Championship, and winning the bronze medal in the 2016 European Korfball Championship.

In Catalonia, the Catalan Korfball League (since the 1985–86 season) and the Catalan Cup (since 1988–89) are held. Currently, there are two senior divisions (First and Second), and a junior division. In the past, there were also Third Division competitions, as well as cadet, children's, and youth championships. The most successful Catalan korfball clubs include Club Korfbal Egara'85, Club Korfbal Vallparadís, Club Korfbal Vacarisses, Sant Llorenç Korfbal Club, Club Korfbal L'Autònoma, Korfbal Club Barcelona, Club Esportiu Vilanova i la Geltrú, Club Korfbal Castellbisbal, and Platja d'Aro Korfbal Club.

== Catalan teams ==
The Catalan competition is divided in a "First division" and a "Second division"

Catalan korfball clubs are:

- C.K. Vacarisses
- C.E. Vilanova i la Geltrú
- C.K. Assessoria Vallparadís
- C.K. Cerdanyola
- C.K. Badalona – La Rotllana
- Sant Llorenç K.C.
- U.K.S.A. – Unió Korfbalera Sant Adrià de Besòs
- K.C. Barcelona
- C.K. Castellbisbal
- K.E.C.A. – Korfbal Esplai Ca n'Anglada
- Korfball Valldemia
- A.A.E.I.E.S. Secretari Coloma de Barcelona

== Titles of Catalan teams ==
- 9 CK Egara 85: (1985–86, 1986–87, 1987–88, 1988–89, 1989–90, 1990–91, 1991–92, 1992–93 and 1993–94)
- 6 CK Vacarisses: (2004–05, 2005–06, 2006–07, 2007–08, 2008–09 and 2009–10)
- 5 Sant Llorenç KC: (1994–95, 1995–96, 1996–97, 1999–2000 and 2000–01)
- 5 CK l'Autònoma: (1997–98, 1998–99, 2001–02, 2002–03 and 2003–04)

== National team ==
The first match of the Catalan korfball team was held in Terrassa on 10 November 1984, against the Netherlands. That match was presided over by the then President of the Generalitat, Jordi Pujol.

The Catalan team began participating in official championships in 1997, but it was not until 2005 that it participated as a full member. The Catalan korfball team was the first Catalan national team in a sport recognized by the International Olympic Committee (IOC) to obtain international recognition.

These are the most important championships in which the Catalan senior team has participated:

Catalonia – Korfball national team
Year	Championship	Host	Classification
1999	6th World Championship	Australia	8th place
2002	2nd European Championship	Catalonia	7th place
2003	7th World Championship	Netherlands	9th place
2005	1st European Bowl	Catalonia	Champions
2006	3rd European Championship	Hungary	6th place
2007	8th World Championship	Czech Republic	9th place
2010	4th European Championship	Netherlands	5th place
2011	9th World Championship	China	4th place
2014	5th European Championship	Portugal	5th place
2015	8th World Championship	Belgium	5th place
2016	6th European Championship	Netherlands	(bronze) 3rd place

== Other Catalan korfball teams ==
The Catalan Korfball Federation (FCK) also promotes the participation of other representative categories, such as under-21 and under-19 teams, as well as mixed teams and youth development squads.

=== Catalonia national under-21 korfball team ===
The Catalonia under-21 korfball team has competed in several editions of the Korfball European U21 Championship. One of its most notable achievements is the bronze medal won at the 2023 Korfball European U21 Championship, held in Terrassa.

=== Catalonia national under-19 korfball team ===
There is also a Catalonia under-19 team, which regularly participates in the World Korfball Championship U19 and other European youth tournaments. It has served as a development platform for players who later joined the senior national team.

== Catalan clubs ==
=== Active Catalan clubs ===
In the 2019–20 season, the following Catalan clubs participated in the official competitions organized by the Catalan Korfball Federation: After the 2015–2016 season, the third division was discontinued.

Club name	Town	Founded	Teams in		
Club name	Town	Founded	1st	2nd	Juniors
AEE INS Montserrat Miró	Montcada i Reixac			x	x
CK Badalona La Rotllana	Badalona	1997	x	x	x
CK Castellbisbal	Castellbisbal	2006	x	x	x
CK Montcada	Montcada i Reixac	2010	x		
CK Vallparadís	Terrassa	2005	x	x	x
KC Barcelona	Barcelona	2006	x	x	x
Platja d'Aro KC	Platja d'Aro		x	x	x
Sant Llorenç KC	Terrassa	1992	x	x	
CK Vacarisses	Vacarisses		x	x	

=== Catalan clubs in Europe ===
Since 1967, the champions of the various European leagues have competed in the Korfball Europa Cup. The first Catalan team to take part was Egara'85 in 1989, finishing in eighth position. The best result by a Catalan team was Sant Llorenç KC’s fourth place in 1997, the year Catalonia hosted the tournament for the first time.

The Europa Shield is the second-tier European club competition. It was established in 2001, and Catalan clubs have participated since the second edition. CK Vallparadís has won the competition three times: in 2009, 2011, and 2013. CE Vilanova i la Geltrú won it in 2014, and KC Barcelona in 2016.

== Beach korfball ==
In Catalonia, various beach korfball competitions have traditionally been organized during the summer, notably those in Vilanova i la Geltrú and Platja d'Aro.

Since the summer of 2013, the Catalan Korfball Federation has unified the various beach tournaments held throughout Catalonia under the so-called Catalan Beach Korfball Circuit.

The league's first edition consisted of five tournaments: Barcelona, Platja d'Aro, Sant Adrià de Besòs, Vilanova i la Geltrú, and Badalona; followed by a final phase in Castelldefels.

In 2014, up to eight beach korfball courts were expected to be installed along the Catalan coastline.

== Notable players ==
Catalonia has produced several prominent Korfball players who have represented the region at various international levels. Many of these athletes have been integral to the Catalonia national korfball team, competing in World and European Championships.

=== Senior Players ===
- Javier Navarro Sánchez – A seasoned international player, Navarro has been a key figure in the Catalonia national korfball team, known for his leadership and experience.
- Pau Segura – A versatile player who has represented Catalonia national korfball team in multiple international tournaments, contributing significantly to the team's success.
- Aitana Segura – A prominent female player, Segura has been part of the Catalonia national korfball team, showcasing exceptional skill and dedication.
- David Puertas – A rising star in Catalan korfball, Puertas has made notable appearances in international competitions, earning recognition for his talent.
- Alba Rosa Lorente – Known for her agility and strategic play, Lorente has been a valuable asset to the Catalonia national korfball team.

=== Youth Players ===
- Júlia Roura – A promising young talent, Roura has represented Catalonia national korfball team in the U19 European Championship, demonstrating her potential on the international stage.
- Martí Margaix – An emerging player in the U19 category, Margaix has shown great promise in his performances for the Catalan national team.
- Berta Ribas – A dynamic young player, Ribas has been part of the U19 team, contributing to Catalonia's competitive presence in international youth tournaments.
- Claudia Martínez – As a member of the U19 team, Martínez has demonstrated skill and determination, representing Catalonia in European competitions.

== See also ==
- Korfball World Championship
- European Korfball Championship
