= 2011–12 Korfball Europa Cup =

European korfball competition

The 2011–12 Korfball Europa Cup is the main korfball competition for clubs in Europe played in the season 2011-2012.

== First round ==
The first round took place in the weekend of 23–25 September 2011 in Prievidza (Slovakia)

| | Pts | P | W | L | PF | PA | DP |
|---|---|---|---|---|---|---|---|
| (Slovakia) Prievidza Dolphins | 12 | 5 | 4 | 1 | 83 | 39 | +44 |
| (France) Bonson | 11 | 5 | 4 | 1 | 53 | 45 | +8 |
| (Turkey) Ankara Üniversitesi | 10 | 5 | 3 | 2 | 69 | 49 | +20 |
| (Serbia) ZEMUN Beograd | 9 | 5 | 3 | 2 | 70 | 59 | +11 |
| (Scotland) Edinburgh | 3 | 5 | 1 | 4 | 39 | 76 | -37 |
| (Italy) EvanSalus | 0 | 5 | 0 | 5 | 32 | 78 | -46 |

== Final round ==
The final round is held in Warsaw, Poland from 17 to 21 January 2012. With the seeded champions of Netherlands, Belgium, Portugal, Czech Republic, Russia, England, Catalonia, Germany and host country Poland. As well as the 3 best teams in the first round.

Qualified teams

- (Netherlands) TOP
- (Belgium) Boeckenberg
- (Portugal) Benfica
- (Czech Republic) Kolín
- (Russia) Orel
- (England) Trojans
- (Catalonia) Vallparadís
- (Germany) Adler Rauxel
- (Slovakia) Prievidza Dolphins
- (France) Bonson
- (Turkey) Ankara Üniversitesi
- (Poland) Megasports Warszawa

=== Competition ===
Preliminary
(Catalonia) | CK Vallparadís | 19
(Slovakia) | Prievidza Dolphins | 15
(England) | Trojans KC | 19
(Turkey) | Ankara Üniversitesi | 10
(Portugal) | Benfica | 36
(France) | FJEP Bonson | 6
(Russia) | Orel STU | 27
(Poland) | M. Warszawa | 18

Quarterfinals
(Catalonia) | CK Vallparadís | 14
(Netherlands) | KV TOP | 40
(England) | Trojans KC | 22
(Germany) | KV Adler Rauxel | 20
(Portugal) | NC Benfica | 19
(Czech Republic) | VKC Kolín | 16
(Russia) | Orel STU | 18
(Belgium) | Boeckenberg KC | 34

Semifinals
(Netherlands) | KV TOP | 33
(England) | Trojans KC | 18
(Portugal) | NC Benfica | 15
(Belgium) | Boeckenberg KC | 34

Final
(Netherlands) | KV TOP | 22
(Belgium) | Boeckenberg KC | 19

=== 9th-12th places ===
9th-12th places
(Slovakia) Prievidza Dolphins | 18
(Turkey) Ankara Üniversitesi | 14
(Poland) M. Warszawa | 26
(France) FJEP Bonson | 8

9th-10th places match
Prievidza Dolphins | 13
M. Warszawa | 17
11th-12th places match
Ankara Üniversitesi SK | 16
FJEP Bonson | 11

=== 5th-8th places ===
5th-8th places
(Catalonia) CK Vallparadís | 20
(Germany) KV Adler Rauxel | 17
(Czech Republic) VKC Kolín | 24
(Russia) Orel STU | 16

5th-6th places match
(Catalonia) CK Vallparadís | 23
(Czech Republic) VKC Kolín | 20
7th-8th places match
(Germany) KV Adler Rauxel | 24
(Russia) Orel STU | 21

=== Title ===
Semi-finals
(Netherlands) KV TOP | 33
(England) Trojans KC | 18
(Portugal) NC Benfica | 15
(Belgium) Boeckenberg KC | 34

Final
(Netherlands) KV TOP | 22
(Belgium) Boeckenberg KC | 19
Third place
(England) Trojans KC | 18
(Portugal) NC Benfica | 16

== Final standings ==
Final standings
| 1 | (Netherlands) KV TOP |
| 2 | (Belgium) Boeckenberg KC |
| 3 | (England) Trojans KC |
| 4 | (Portugal) NC Benfica |
| 5 | (Catalonia) CK Vallparadís |
| 6 | (Czech Republic) VKC Kolín |
| 7 | (Germany) KV Adler Rauxel |
| 8 | (Russia) Orel STU |
| 9 | (Poland) Megasports Warszawa |
| 10 | (Slovakia) SKK Prievidza Dolphins |
| 11 | (Turkey) Ankara Üniversitesi SK |
| 12 | (France) FJEP Bonson |
