= 2015–16 England Korfball League =

England Korfball League
- Season: 2015–16
- Champions: Trojans (9th title)
- Relegated: Croydon
- Matches played: 56
- Goals scored: 2,204 (39.36 per match)
- Top goalscorer: Charlie Vogwill (107 goals)

The 2015–16 England Korfball League season is played with 8 teams. Trojans KC are the defending champions.

== Teams ==
A total of 8 teams will be taking part in the league: The best six teams from the 2014-15 season and the number 1 and 2 of the 2014-15 promotion/relegation play-offs.

Location of teams outside London:2015-16 England Korfball League
Locations of teams in London:2015-16 England Korfball League

Club	Province	Location	Position in 2014-15
Nomads	Surrey	Epsom	6th
Trojans	Greater London	Croydon	1st
Bec	Greater London	South Croydon	2nd
Croydon	Greater London	Croydon	2nd in promotion/relegation play-offs
Kingfisher	Kent	Aylesford	3rd
KV	Kent	Aylesford	4th
Tornadoes	Kent	Aylesford	1st in promotion/relegation play-offs
Norwich Knights	Norfolk	Norwich	5th

== Regular Season Table ==
Pos	Team	Pld	W	D	L	GF	GA	GD	Pts	Play-offs or relegation
1	Bec	14	13	0	1	367	176	+191	26	Final Stages
2	Trojans	14	13	0	1	370	218	+152	26	Final Stages
3	Kingfisher	14	7	1	6	286	248	+38	15	Final Stages
4	Nomads	14	7	0	7	271	243	+28	14	Final Stages
5	Norwich Knights	14	7	0	7	303	265	+38	14	
6	Tornadoes	14	5	1	8	255	289	−34	11	
7	KV	14	3	0	11	217	288	−71	6	promotion / relegation play-off
8	Croydon	14	0	0	14	132	477	−345	0	Relegation

Updated to match(es) played on 4 April 2016. Source: England Korfball

== Final Stages ==
Semi-finals
30 April 2016 -
Bec	22
Kingfishers	13
30 April 2016 -
Trojans	28
Nomads	18

Final
1 May 2016 -
Trojans	21
Bec	20
Third place
1 May 2016 -
Nomads	19
Kingfishers	23
