= Korfball Europa Cup =

The Korfball European Cup was the main annual korfball competition for clubs in Europe. The first Europa Cup took place in 1967 in London (England), with two teams from the Netherlands, Belgium and the host nation England. Ons Eibernest from The Hague won the first tournament. The tournament was won exclusively by clubs from the Netherlands and Belgium, and Mitcham (England) and Adler Rauxel (Germany) were the only clubs outside Netherlands and Belgium to reach the final. In January 2022, the IKF announced that the IKF Europa Cup and IKF Europa Shield would be replaced by the IKF Europe Korfball Champions League for the 2022-23 Season.

== History ==
Outdoor Europa Cup
Year	Host	(gold) Champions	(silver) Second	(bronze) Third
1967	Mitcham	(Netherlands) Ons Eibernest	(Netherlands) ROHDA	(Belgium) ATBS
1968	Antwerp	(Netherlands) AKC Blauw-Wit	(Netherlands) Ons Eibernest	(Belgium) Scaldis SC
1969	Eindhoven	(Netherlands) AKC Blauw-Wit	(Netherlands) ROHDA	(Belgium) ATBS
1970	Croydon	(Netherlands) Ons Eibernest	(Netherlands) AKC Blauw-Wit	(Belgium) Meeuwen
1971	Antwerp	(Netherlands) Ons Eibernest	(Netherlands) LUTO	(Belgium) Scaldis SC
1972	Amsterdam	(Netherlands) ROHDA	(Netherlands) Ons Eibernest	(Belgium) AKC
1973	London	(Netherlands) Ons Eibernest	(Belgium) Riviera KC	(Netherlands) ROHDA
1974	Antwerp	(Netherlands) Ons Eibernest	(Belgium) Riviera KC	(Belgium) ATBS
1975	The Hague	(Netherlands) Ons Eibernest	(Netherlands) LUTO	(Belgium) Boeckenberg
1976	Mitcham	(Netherlands) Ons Eibernest	(Netherlands) LUTO	(Belgium) Kwik
1977	Bochum	(Belgium) Riviera KC	(Netherlands) PKC	(Belgium) Kwik
1978	Antwerp	(Netherlands) LUTO	(Belgium) Riviera KC	(Belgium) Kwik
1979	Papendrecht	(Netherlands) PKC	(Belgium) Borgerhout	(Germany) Schweriner KC
1980	Papendrecht	(Netherlands) PKC	(Germany) Adler Rauxel	(Belgium) Kwik
1981	Ekeren	(Netherlands) PKC	(Belgium) Kwik	(Germany)
1982	Nijeveen	(Netherlands) DOS '46	(Belgium) Borgerhout	(Germany) Adler Rauxel
1983	Antwerp	(Netherlands) ROHDA	(Belgium) Borgerhout	(Germany) Adler Rauxel
1985	Papendrecht	(Netherlands) PKC	(Belgium) Borgerhout	(Germany) Adler Rauxel
1986	Antwerp	(Belgium) AKC	(Netherlands) Fortuna	(Germany) Adler Rauxel

Indoor Europa Cup
Year	Host	(gold) Champions	(silver) Second	(bronze) Third
1985	Papendrecht	(Netherlands) PKC	(Belgium) Sikopi	(Germany) Adler Rauxel
1986	Bourges	(Netherlands) ROHDA	(Belgium) AKC	(Germany) Adler Rauxel
1988	Antwerp	(Netherlands) Oost-Arnhem	(Belgium) AKC	(Germany) Adler Rauxel
1989	Arnhem	(Netherlands) Oost-Arnhem	(Belgium) AKC	(Germany) Adler Rauxel
1990	Papendrecht	(Netherlands) PKC	(Belgium) Catbavrienden	(Germany) Adler Rauxel
1991	Lisbon	(Belgium) Sikopi	(Netherlands) Fortuna	(Germany) Adler Rauxel
1992	Saint-Étienne	(Belgium) Catbavrienden	(Netherlands) Deetos	(Germany) Adler Rauxel
1993	Castrop-Rauxel	(Netherlands) Deetos	(Belgium) Catbavrienden	(Germany) Grün-Weiss
1994	Olomouc	(Netherlands) Deetos	(Belgium) Borgerhout	(Germany) Grün-Weiss
1995	Debrecen	(Netherlands) ROHDA	(Belgium) Catbavrienden	(Germany) Grün-Weiss
1996	Crystal Palace, London	(Netherlands) Deetos	(Belgium) Mercurius	(England) Mitcham
1997	Terrassa	(Belgium) Catbavrienden	(Netherlands) Oost-Arnhem	(Czech Republic) VKC Kolín
1998	Antwerp	(Belgium) Catbavrienden	(England) Mitcham	(Germany) Grün-Weiss
1999	Prague	(Netherlands) PKC	(Belgium) AKC	(England) Mitcham
2000	Papendrecht	(Netherlands) PKC	(Belgium) Sikopi	(Germany) Adler Rauxel
2001	Terrassa	(Netherlands) Die Haghe	(Belgium) AKC	(Germany) Grün-Weiss
2002	Prague	(Netherlands) PKC	(Belgium) AKC	(Czech Republic) Havířov
2003	Antwerp	(Netherlands) Die Haghe	(Belgium) AKC	(England) Invicta
2004	Delft	(Netherlands) Fortuna/Tempus	(Belgium) AKC/Café Bar	(Czech Republic) České Budějovice
2005	Saint-Étienne	(Netherlands) Fortuna/Tempus	(Belgium) AKC/Café Bar	(Portugal) Benfica
2006	Prievidza	(Netherlands) PKC/Café Bar	(Belgium) Riviera KC	(Russia) Oryol STU
2007	Antwerp	(Netherlands) DOS '46	(Belgium) Riviera KC	(Czech Republic) České Budějovice
2008	Carcavelos	(Netherlands) DOS '46	(Belgium) Boeckenberg	(England) Mitcham
2009	Zaanstad	(Netherlands) Koog Zaandijk	(Belgium) Boeckenberg	(Portugal) CC Oeiras
2010	Herentals	(Netherlands) DOS '46	(Belgium) Boeckenberg	(Germany) Adler Rauxel
2011	Budapest	(Netherlands) Koog Zaandijk	(Belgium) Scaldis SC	(Czech Republic) České Budějovice
2012	Warsaw	(Netherlands) TOP	(Belgium) Boeckenberg	(England) Trojans
2013	Budapest	(Netherlands) Koog Zaandijk	(Belgium) Boeckenberg KC	(Portugal) NC Benfica
2014	Papendrecht	(Netherlands) PKC/Hagero	(Belgium) Boeckenberg KC	(Portugal) NC Benfica
2015	Tielen	(Netherlands) TOP/Quoratio	(Belgium) Scaldis	(Portugal) NC Benfica
2016	Budapest	(Netherlands) PKC/Hagero	(Belgium) Boeckenberg KC	(Portugal) NC Benfica
2017	Sassenheim	(Netherlands) TOP/Quoratio	(Belgium) Boeckenberg KC	(England) Trojans
2018	Barcelona	(Netherlands) TOP/Solar Compleet	(Belgium) AKC/Luma	(Germany) SG Pegasus
2019	Kortrijk	(Netherlands) TOP/Solar Compleet	(Belgium) Boeckenberg KC	(England) Trojans
2020	Budapest	(Netherlands) Fortuna/Delta Logistiek	(Belgium) Kwik	(Germany) SG Pegasus
2021
2022
2023		(Netherlands)	(Netherlands)	(Belgium)

- 2021 and 2022 European Cup were canceled due to COVID-19.
- Since 2023, the European Cup will be replaced by the Champions League.

== Medals ==
=== Outdoor (1967–1986) ===
Rank	Nation	Gold	Silver	Bronze	Total
1	Netherlands	17	10	1	28
2	Belgium	2	8	12	22
3	Germany	0	1	6	7
Totals (3 entries)		19	19	19	57

=== Indoor (1985–2023) ===
Rank	Nation	Gold	Silver	Bronze	Total
1	Netherlands	32	4	0	36
2	Belgium	4	31	1	36
3	England	0	1	6	7
4	Germany	0	0	16	16
5	Czech Republic	0	0	6	6
5	Portugal	0	0	6	6
7	Russia	0	0	1	1
Totals (7 entries)		36	36	36	108

== Record tables ==
Performance by nation indoor
Nation	Winners	Runners-up	Third place
Netherlands	31	3	0
Belgium	4	31	0
England	0	1	6
Germany	0	0	16
Czech Republic	0	0	6
Portugal	0	0	6
Russia	0	0	1

Performance by club indoor
#	Club	Nation	Winners	Runners-up	Third place
1	PKC	Netherlands	8	0	0
2	TOP	Netherlands	5	0	0
3	Catbavrienden	Belgium	3	3	0
4	Fortuna	Netherlands	3	1	0
5	Deetos	Netherlands	3	0	0
5	DOS '46	Netherlands	3	0	0
5	Koog Zaandijk	Netherlands	3	0	0
8	Oost Arnhem	Netherlands	2	1	0
9	ROHDA	Netherlands	2	0	0
9	Die Haghe	Netherlands	2	0	0
11	Sikopi	Belgium	1	2	0
12	AKC	Belgium	0	10	0
13	Boeckenberg	Belgium	0	9	0
14	Riviera	Belgium	0	2	0
14	Scaldis	Belgium	0	2	0
16	Mitcham	England	0	1	3
17	Borgerhout	Belgium	0	1	0
17	Kwik	Belgium	0	1	0
17	Mercurius	Belgium	0	1	0
20	Adler Rauxel	Germany	0	0	8
21	Grün-Weiss	Germany	0	0	5
21	NC Benfica	Portugal	0	0	5
23	České Budějovice	Czech Republic	0	0	3
23	Trojans	England	0	0	3
25	SG Pegasus	Germany	0	0	2
26	VKC Kolín	Czech Republic	0	0	1
26	Havířov	Czech Republic	0	0	1
26	Invicta	England	0	0	1
26	Oryol STU	Russia	0	0	1
26	CC Oeiras	Portugal	0	0	1
