= 2017–18 England Korfball League =

England Korfball League
- Season: 2017–18
- Champions: Trojans (11th Title)
- Goals scored: 3,720
- Top goalscorer: David Brooks (118 Goals)
- Biggest home win: Tornadoes 49-14 Bearsted (11 January 2018)
- Biggest away win: Bearsted 19-43 Trojans (19 November 2017)
- Highest scoring: Tornadoes 49-14 Bearsted (11 January 2018)

The 2017–18 England Korfball League season is played with 10 teams. Trojans KC are the defending korfball champions.

== Teams ==
The league will be played with 10 teams. The teams that have finished from 1st to 7th place as of 9 April 2017 in the 2016–17 season qualified for the 2017/18 season. The remaining three places were filled by Cambridge Tigers, Birmingham City and Bearsted who finished in the top three of the Promotion play-offs.

Location of teams outside London:2016-17 England Korfball League
Locations of teams in London:2016-17 England Korfball League

| Club | Province | Location | Position in 2016-17 |
|---|---|---|---|
| Trojans Korfball Club | Greater London | Croydon | 1st |
| Bec | Greater London | South Croydon | 3rd |
| KV | Kent | Aylesford | 7th |
| Nomads | Surrey | Epsom | 5th |
| Kingfishers | Kent | Aylesford | 4th |
| Tornadoes | Kent | Aylesford | 6th |
| Norwich Knights | Norfolk | Norwich | 2nd |
| Cambridge Tigers | Cambridgeshire | Cambridge | 1st in promotion/relegation play-offs |
| Birmingham City | West Midlands | Birmingham | 2nd promotion/relegation play-offs |
| Bearsted | Kent | Aylesford | 3rd in promotion/relegation play-offs |

== Regular season table ==
| Pos | Team | Pld | W | D | L | GF | GA | GD | Pts | Play-offs or relegation |
|---|---|---|---|---|---|---|---|---|---|---|
| 1 | Trojans | 18 | 17 | 0 | 1 | 544 | 312 | +232 | 34 | Final Stages |
| 2 | Bec | 18 | 17 | 0 | 1 | 489 | 283 | +206 | 34 | Final Stages |
| 3 | Tornadoes | 18 | 12 | 0 | 6 | 459 | 329 | +130 | 24 | Final Stages |
| 4 | Norwich Knights | 18 | 12 | 1 | 5 | 464 | 310 | +154 | 25 | Final Stages |
| 5 | Kingfishers | 18 | 9 | 0 | 9 | 430 | 355 | +75 | 18 | |
| 6 | KV | 18 | 5 | 3 | 10 | 278 | 370 | −92 | 13 | |
| 7 | Nomads | 18 | 6 | 0 | 12 | 330 | 371 | −41 | 12 | |
| 8 | Birmingham City | 18 | 3 | 2 | 13 | 230 | 406 | −176 | 8 | |
| 9 | Cambridge Tigers | 18 | 3 | 2 | 13 | 247 | 447 | −200 | 8 | |
| 10 | Bearsted | 18 | 2 | 0 | 16 | 249 | 537 | −288 | 4 | Relegation |

Updated to match(es) played on unknown. Source: England Korfball

== Results ==
=== Game-week one ===
| 15 October 2017 | Tornadoes | 20-6 | Birmingham City | Ayelsford Sports College |
| 12:30 | | Report |

| 15 October 2017 | Cambridge Tigers | 17-33 | Trojans | The Perse School |
| 14:15 | | Report |

| 22 October 2017 | Bearsted | 14-19 | Cambridge Tigers | New Line Learning Academy |
| | | Report |

| 22 October 2017 | Norwich Knights | 22-14 | KV | UEA |
| | | Report |

| 22 October 2017 | Kingfishers | 30-24 | Nomads | Aylesford Sports College |
| | | Report |

| 22 October 2017 | Trojans | 22-24 | Bec | Trinity |
| | | Report |

=== Game-week two ===
| 29 October 2017 | Bearsted | 17-35 | Kingfishers | Ayelsford Sports College |
| | | Report |

| 29 October 2017 | KV | 13-13 | Birmingham City | Kings Sports Centre |
| | | Report |

| 29 October 2017 | Trojans | 25-17 | Norwich Knights | Trinity |
| | | Report |

| 29 October 2017 | Cambridge Tigers | 8-36 | Bec | The Perse School |
| | | Report |

=== Game-week three ===
| 12 November 2017 | Kingfishers | 28-17 | KV | New Line Learning Academy |
| | | Report |

| 12 November 2017 | Nomads | 18-11 | Cambridge Tigers | Epsom College |
| | | Report |

| 12 November 2017 | Trojans | 24-22 | Tornadoes | Trinity |
| | | Report |

| 12 November 2017 | Bearsted | 15-18 | Birmingham City | Ayelsford Sports College |
| | | Report |

=== Game-week four ===
| 18 November 2017 | Birmingham City | 13-12 | Nomads | Woodcock Sports Centre |
| | | Report |

| 19 November 2017 | Bearsted | 19-43 | Trojans | Ayelsford Sports College |
| | | Report |

| 19 November 2017 | Tornadoes | 22-18 | Norwich Knights | Ayelsford Sports College |
| | | Report |

| 19 November 2017 | Bec | 25-6 | KV | Whitgift School |
| | | Report |

| 19 November 2017 | Kingfishers | 29-9 | Cambridge Tigers | Ayelsford sports College |
| | | Report |

=== Game-week five ===
| 26 November 2017 | Bearsted | 18-16 | KV | Ayelsford Sports College |
| | | Report |

| 26 November 2017 | Bec | 22-19 | Tornadoes | Whitgift School |
| | | Report |

| 26 November 2017 | Nomads | 15-18 | Norwich Knights | Epsom College |
| | | Report |

| 26 November 2017 | Birmingham City | 17-23 | Kingfishers | Woodcock Sports Centre |
| | | Report |

=== Game-week six ===
| 10 December 2017 | Tornadoes | 34-18 | KV | Ayelsford Sports College |
| | | Report |

| 10 December 2017 | Kingfishers | 17-21 | Bec | Ayelsford sports College |
| | | Report |

| 10 December 2017 | Birmingham City | - | Cambridge Tigers | Woodcock Sports Centre |

| 10 December 2017 | Bearsted | - | Norwich Knights | Ayelsford Sports College |

| 10 December 2017 | Nomads | 17-31 | Trojans | Epsom College |
| | | Report |

=== Game-week seven ===
| 17 December 2017 | Kingfishers | 20-22 | Tornadoes | New Line Learning Academy |
| | | Report |

| 17 December 2017 | Birmingham City | 16-33 | Trojans | Woodcock Sports Centre |
| | | Report |

| 17 December 2017 | Bearsted | 20-41 | Bec | Ayelsford Sports College |
| | | Report |

| 17 December 2017 | Cambridge Tigers | 8-35 | Norwich Knights | The Perse School |
| | | Report |

| 17 December 2017 | KV | 22-19 | Nomads | Kings Sports Centre |
| | | Report |

=== Game-week eight ===
| 7 January 2018 | KV | 22-22 | Cambridge Tigers | Kings Sports Centre |
| | | Report |

| 7 January 2018 | Birmingham City | 9-29 | Norwich Knights | Woodcock Sports Centre |
| | | Report |

| 7 January 2018 | Tornadoes | 49-14 | Bearsted | New Line Learning Academy |
| | | Report |

| 7 January 2018 | Nomads | 14-19 | Bec | Epsom College |
| | | Report |

| 7 January 2018 | Kingfishers | 23-30 | Trojans | New Line Learning Academy |
| | | Report |

=== Game-week nine ===
| 13 January 2018 | Bec | 32-24 | Norwich Knights | Trinity School Sports Centre |
| | | Report |

| 14 January 2018 | Nomads | 20-16 | Bearsted | Epsom College |
| | | Report |

| 14 January 2018 | Norwich Knights | 23-11 | Kingfishers | UEA |
| | | Report |

| 14 January 2018 | Bec | 31-10 | Birmingham City | Royal Russell |
| | | Report |

| 14 January 2018 | Cambridge Tigers | 18-27 | Tornadoes | The Perse School |
| | | Report |

=== Game-week ten ===
| 28 January 2018 | KV | 21-11 | Kingfishers | Kings Sports Centre |
| | | Report |

| 28 January 2018 | Birmingham City | 16-9 | Bearsted | Woodcock Sports Centre |
| | | Report |

| 28 January 2018 | Cambridge Tigers | 16-18 | Nomads | The Perse School |
| | | Report |

| 28 January 2018 | Tornadoes | 21-27 | Trojans | New Line Learning Academy |
| | | Report |

=== Game-week eleven ===
| 4 February 2018 | Trojans | 35-14 | Bearsted | Trinity |
| | | Report |

| 4 February 2018 | KV | 7-29 | Bec | Kings Sports Centre |
| | | Report |

| 4 February 2018 | Cambridge Tigers | 11-28 | Kingfishers | The Perse School |
| | | Report |

| 4 February 2018 | Nomads | 24-13 | Birmingham City | Epsom College |
| | | Report |

| 11 February 2018 | Birmingham City | 11-19 | KV | Woodcock Sports Centre |
| | | Report |

| 11 February 2017 | Tornadoes | 21-19 | Nomads | Ayelsford Sports College |
| | | Report |

=== Game-week twelve ===
| 17 February 2018 | Norwich Knights | 22-19 | Tornadoes | UEA |
| | | Report |

| 18 February 2018 | Bearsted | 11-38 | Tornadoes | New Line Learning Academy |
| | | Report |

| 18 February 2018 | Bec | 26-10 | Nomads | Whitgift |
| | | Report |

| 18 February 2018 | Trojans | 22-19 | Kingfishers | Trinity |
| | | Report |

| 18 February 2018 | Norwich Knights | 24-11 | Birmingham City | UEA |
| | | Report |

| 18 February 2018 | Cambridge Tigers | 7-21 | KV | The Perse School |

== Final Stages ==
Semi-finals
6 May 2017 -
Trojans | 29
[Tornadoes] | 24
6 May 2017 -
Bec | 22
Norwich Knights | 18

Final
7 May 2017 -
Trojans | 23
Bec | 22
Third place
7 May 2017 -
[Tornadoes] | 33
Norwich Knights | 29

| Rank | Team |
|---|---|
| 1st place, gold medalist(s) | Trojans |
| 2nd place, silver medalist(s) | Bec |
| 3rd place, bronze medalist(s) | Tornadoes |
| 4 | Norwich Knights |

== Top scorers ==
| Rank | Player | Club | Goals |
|---|---|---|---|
| 1 | David Brooks | Trojans | 118 |
| 2 | Tony Woodvine | Trojans | 102 |
| 3 | Charlie Vogwill | Norwich Knights | 94 |
| 4 | Blake Palfreyman | Bec | 91 |
| 4 | Paul Debenham | Norwich Knights | 89 |
| 5 | Jonathan Nickerson | Trojans | 83 |
| 6= | Stan Dunn | Norwich Knights | 77 |
| 6= | Davesh Patel | Bec | 77 |
| 7 | Ollie Bell | Nomads | 72 |
| 8= | Jacob Dawes | Tornadoes | 68 |
| 8= | Owen Bailey | Tornadoes | 67 |

== Squads ==
The players listed are those who have appeared at least twice for their club in a league game.

=== Bearsted ===
- David Wiseman
- John Haggart
- James Norman
- Karl Sieber
- Alexander Sieber
- Tom Sandow
- Christopher Beale

- Alicia Nolan
- Emma Sackett
- Amy Sheraton-Baker
- Sophie Parker
- Jessica Long
- Zara Wheaton

- Head coach: Alexander Sieber

=== Bec ===
- Blake Palfreyman
- Davesh Patel
- Joe Bedford
- Kieron Hicks
- Andrew Hall
- Ben King
- Billy Ashby

- Amy Swain
- Heather Ikwuemesi
- Jo-Anne Wilson
- Anna Rocha
- Kenzie Baldock
- Helen West
- Hoyei Knauss
- Sara Rocha
- Jessica Bennett
- Chloe Swain

- Head Coach: John Denton

=== Birmingham City ===
- Andy Davies
- Marcus Tighe
- Alex Seabright
- Rick Scowcroft
- Merrick Lloyd
- Stewart Mcconvery

- Jessica Davies
- Laura Morris
- Vanessa Gifford
- Bethany Jones
- Caroline Waide
- Bethan Phillips

- Head Coach: Andy Davies

=== Cambridge Tigers ===
- Joshua Dawes
- Chris West
- Rory Haughan
- Oscar Edwards
- Thomas Northfield
- Ross Thomson

- Francisca Wollerton
- Jenny Adamson
- Olivia Harcourt
- Lucy Northfield
- Daisy Llewellyn
- Keira Washtell

- Head Coach: Chris West

=== Kingfishers ===
- Ryan Medhurst
- Liam Kirby
- George Fitzgerald
- Liam Geddes
- Tom Woolmer
- Chris Martin

- Shannon Jones
- Saskia Carr-Taylor
- Mallory Gore
- Rebecca Clements
- Lauren Hall
- Rachel Turner

- Head Coach: Johan Oosterling

=== KV ===
- James Summers
- Flynn Picot
- Will Alderton
- Robert Summers
- Robert Williams
- Luke Flanagan
- Dan Howard

- Tamara Siemienuk
- Kirsty Aldridge
- Annie Boyd
- Ellie Summers
- Alice Arnold
- Emma Denton

- Head Coach: Rob Parker

=== Nomads ===
- Ollie Bell
- Dinos Tritsarolis
- Alex Bell
- Alex Smith
- Sam Lee
- Simon Cole
- Anthony Taylor
- George Rourke

- Abby Golding
- Tamika Zilm
- Helen Davies
- Vicki Gee
- Amy Smith
- Rebekah Humphries

- Head Coach: Terry Forde

=== Norwich Knights ===
- Paul Debenham
- Charlie Vogwill
- Stan Dunn
- Josh Rowe
- Luke Coyte-Mckenzie

- Claire Dique
- Lizzie Mccloud
- Heather Stokes
- Adele Mitchell
- Anna Woodall
- Joanna Cook

- Head Coach: Joe Stirling

=== Tornadoes ===
- Owen Bailey
- Daniel Brown
- Shane Buckland
- Zach Catterall
- Jacob Dawes

- Eleanor Parker
- Elise Sparks
- Ashley Warner
- Alexandra Falcsik
- Ayishah Chaudry
- Alex Richardson

- Head Coach: Dave Buckland

=== Trojans ===
- David Brooks
- Tony Woodvine
- Jonathan Nickerson
- Sam Brooks
- Toby Clarke
- Matthew Brooks

- Neala Brennan
- Amy Turner
- Hannah Goodridge
- Lia Matthews
- Kathryn Brooks
- Laura Pacey
- Emily Brooks

- Head Coach: Gary Brooks
