= 2009–10 Korfball Europa Cup =

The 2010 Korfball Europa Cup is the main korfball competition for clubs in Europe in 2010.

== First round ==
The first round took place in the weekend 3–4 October in Kocaeli (Turkey) and Třeboň (Czech Republic).

POOL A	Pts	P	W	L	PF	PA	DP
(Germany) Adler Rauxel	11	4	4	0	50	30	+20
(England) Trojans	9	4	3	1	58	31	+27
(Catalonia) CK Vacarisses	7	4	2	2	47	43	+4
(Turkey) Kocaeli U.	3	4	1	3	33	46	-13
(Scotland) St Andrews U.	0	4	0	4	22	60	-38

POOL B	Pts	P	W	L	PF	PA	DP
(Russia) Orel OSTU	9	3	3	0	79	40	+39
(Hungary) Szentendre KK	6	3	2	1	62	42	+20
(Czech Republic) Ceské Budejovice	3	3	1	2	49	46	+3
(France) COK Granges	0	3	0	3	19	81	-62
(Poland) M. Warszawa	-	-	-	-	-	-	-

3/10/09	Kocaeli U.	13-4	St Andrews U.
3/10/09	CK Vacarisses	13-14*	Adler Rauxel
3/10/09	Trojans	22-7	St Andrews U.
3/10/09	Kocaeli U.	6-16	Adler Rauxel
3/10/09	Trojans	13-9	CK Vacarisses
4/10/09	Kocaeli U.	8-11	CK Vacarisses
4/10/09	Trojans	8-9	Adler Rauxel
4/10/09	CK Vacarisses	14-8	St Andrews U.
4/10/09	Kocaeli U.	6-15	Trojans
4/10/09	Adler Rauxel	11-3	St Andrews U.

3/10/09	Szentendre KK	24-7	COK Granges
3/10/09	M. Warszawa	-	Szentendre KK
3/10/09	Ceské Budejovice	15-21	Orel OSTU
3/10/09	Orel OSTU	36-6	COK Granges
3/10/09	Ceské Budejovice	13-19	Szentendre KK
3/10/09	Orel OSTU	-	M. Warszawa
4/10/09	Ceské Budejovice	-	M. Warszawa
4/10/09	Ceské Budejovice	21-6	COK Granges
4/10/09	Orel OSTU	22-19	Szentendre KK
4/10/09	COK Granges	-	M. Warszawa

== Final round ==
The final round was held in Herentals (Belgium) from January 20 to 23, 2010

GROUP A	Pts	P	W	L	PF	PA	DP
(Netherlands) DOS'46	9	3	3	0	117	27	+90
(Germany) Adler Rauxel	6	3	2	1	44	56	-12
(Portugal) CC Oeiras	3	3	1	2	47	81	-34
(Hungary) Szentendre KK	0	3	0	3	38	82	-44

GROUP B	Pts	P	W	L	PF	PA	DP
(Belgium) Boeckenberg	9	3	3	0	103	35	+68
(Russia) Orel OSTU	6	3	2	1	55	75	-20
(Czech Republic) Ceské Budejovice	3	3	1	2	46	63	-17
(England) Trojans	0	3	0	3	42	73	-31

20/1/10	Adler Rauxel	21-13	Szentendre KK
20/1/10	DOS'46	45-15	CC Oeiras
21/1/10	CC Oeiras	19-17	Szentendre KK
21/1/10	DOS'46	30-4	Adler Rauxel
22/1/10	Adler Rauxel	19-13	CC Oeiras
22/1/10	DOS'46	42-8	Szentendre KK

20/1/10	Ceské Budejovice	17-19	Orel OSTU
20/1/10	Boeckenberg	31-12	Trojans
21/1/10	Trojans	18-23	Orel OSTU
21/1/10	Boeckenberg	32-10	Ceské Budejovice
22/1/10	Ceské Budejovice	19-12	Trojans
22/1/10	Boeckenberg	40-13	Orel OSTU

7th-8th places

23/01/10 / Trojans / 20-15 / Szentendre KK

5th-6th places

23/01/10 / Ceské Budejovice / 14-5 / CC Oeiras

3rd-4th places

23/01/10 / Orel OSTU / 12-13 / Adler Rauxel

FINAL

23/01/10 / Boeckenberg / 20-27 / DOS'46

== Final standings ==
Final standings
1	DOS'46
2	Boeckenberg
3	Adler Rauxel
4	Orel OSTU
5	Ceské Budejovice
6	CC Oeiras
7	Trojans
8	Szentendre KK
