= Korfball League & Promotion Division promotion/relegation play-off =

Promotion/relegation play-offs
- Country: England
- Number of clubs: 5
- Current: 2016-17 promotion/relegation play-off

The Korfball League & Promotion Division promotion/relegation play-off is played between the number 9 of the England Korfball League and the top 2 teams of the Promotion Division North & West and South & East. The English Korfball Association is the administrator of the play-off.

== History ==
The 2014/2015 edition of the league was won by Tornadoes.

== Champions ==
Season	Champions	2nd Promotion spot
2014–15	Tornadoes	Croydon
2015–16	KV	Bearsted
