= 2012–13 Korfball Europa Cup =

The 2012–13 Korfball Europa Cup was the main korfball competition for clubs in Europe played in the season 2012-2013.

== First round ==
The first round took place in the weekend of 14–16 September 2012 in Montrond-les-Bains (France).

	Pts	P	W	L	PF	PA	DP
(Serbia) Beograd Korfball Club	12	4	4	0	53	30	+23
(France) Bonson	9	4	3	1	54	31	+23
(Turkey) Nazilli Belediye	6	4	2	2	46	42	+6
(Wales) Cardiff City	3	4	1	3	27	44	-17
(Scotland) St Andrews University	0	4	0	4	25	58	-33

== Final round ==
The final round was held in Budapest, Hungary from 16 to 19 January 2013. With the seeded champions of Netherlands, Belgium, Portugal, Czech Republic, Russia, England, Germany, Catalonia, Poland and host country Hungary, as well as the 2 best teams in the first round.

Qualified teams

- (Netherlands) Koog Zaandijk
- (Belgium) Boeckenberg
- (Portugal) Benfica
- (Czech Republic) České Budějovice
- (Russia) Orel
- (England) Trojans
- (Germany) Schweriner KC
- (Catalonia) CEVG
- (Hungary) Szentendre KK
- (Poland) Megasports Warszawa
- (France) Bonson
- (Serbia) Beograd

=== Competition ===
Preliminary
(Hungary)	Szentendre KK	22
(Russia)	Orel	24
(Catalonia)	CEVG	28
(France)	FJEP Bonson	10
(Czech Republic)	České Budějovice	32
(Serbia)	Beograd KK	17
(Germany)	Schweriner KC	22
(Poland)	M. Warszawa	7

Quarterfinals
(Russia)	Orel	14
(Netherlands)	Koog Zaandijk	43
(Catalonia)	CEVG	22
(Portugal)	NC Benfica	26
(Czech Republic)	České Budějovice	16
(England)	Trojans KC	15
(Germany)	Schweriner KC	15
(Belgium)	Boeckenberg KC	28

Semifinals
(Netherlands)	Koog Zaandijk	33
(Portugal)	NC Benfica	14
(Czech Republic)	České Budějovice	19
(Belgium)	Boeckenberg KC	39

Final
(Netherlands)	Koog Zaandijk	20
(Belgium)	Boeckenberg KC	18

== Final standings ==
Final standings
1	(Netherlands) Koog Zaandijk
2	(Belgium) Boeckenberg KC
3	(Portugal) NC Benfica
4	(Czech Republic) České Budějovice
5	(Russia) Orel STU
6	(England) Trojans KC
7	(Germany) Schweriner KC
8	(Catalonia) CEVG
9	(Hungary) Szentendre KK
10	(Poland) Megasports Warszawa
11	(France) FJEP Bonson
12	(Serbia) Beograd
