= 2010–11 Korfball Europa Cup =

The 2010–11 Korfball Europa Cup is the main korfball competition for clubs in Europe played in the season 2010–2011.

== First round ==
The first round took place in the weekend of 24–26 September in Wrocław (Poland)

POOL A	Pts	P	W	L	PF	PA	DP
(Catalonia) CK Vacarisses	12	4	4	0	72	39	+33
(Czech Republic) C. Budejovice	8	4	3	1	65	35	+30
(England) Trojans	7	4	2	2	64	31	+33
(Poland) AZS Wroclaw	3	4	1	3	46	60	-14
(Scotland) St Andrews U.	0	4	0	4	14	96	-82

POOL B	Pts	P	W	L	PF	PA	DP
(Portugal) CC Oeiras	12	4	4	0	66	32	+34
(Germany) Adler Rauxel	9	4	3	1	55	33	+22
(Slovakia) SKK Prievidza	6	4	2	2	37	37	=
(Turkey) Kocaeli U.	3	4	1	3	37	61	-24
(France) Bonson FJEP	0	4	0	4	28	60	-32

10/9/24	CK Vacarisses	25-5	St Andrews U.
10/9/24	Trojans	18-7	AZS Wroclaw
10/9/25	AZS Wroclaw	23-4	St Andrews U.
10/9/25	C. Budejovice	15-16	CK Vacarisses
10/9/25	St Andrews U.	2-27	Trojans
10/9/25	CK Vacarisses	20-10	AZS Wroclaw
10/9/25	C. Budejovice	11-10*	Trojans
10/9/26	C. Budejovice	18-6	AZS Wroclaw
10/9/26	Trojans	9-11	CK Vacarisses
10/9/26	C. Budejovice	21-3	St Andrews U.

10/9/24	Adler Rauxel	9-7	SKK Prievidza
10/9/24	Bonson FJEP	11-12	Kocaeli Univ.
10/9/25	SKK Prievidza	12-10	Kocaeli Univ.
10/9/25	CC Oeiras	21-6	Bonson FJEP
10/9/25	Kocaeli Univ.	7-19	Adler Rauxel
10/9/25	Bonson FJEP	5-9	SKK Prievidza
10/9/25	CC Oeiras	13-9	Adler Rauxel
10/9/26	CC Oeiras	13-9	SKK Prievidza
10/9/26	CC Oeiras	19-8	Kocaeli Univ.
10/9/26	Adler Rauxel	18-6	Bonson FJEP

5th place

10/09/26	Trojans	16-7	SKK Prievidza

== Final round ==
The final round is held in Hungary in January 2011, with the champions of the Netherlands -Koog Zaandijk-, Belgium -Scaldis- and host country champions -Szentendre- and the 5 best teams in the first round CK Vacarisses (CAT), CC Oeiras (POR), Ceské Budejovice (CZE), Adler Rauxel (GER) and Trojans (ENG).

GROUP A	Pts	P	W	L	PF	PA	DP
(Belgium) R Scaldis SC	9	3	3	0	85	29	+56
(Czech Republic) C. Budejovice	6	3	2	1	54	64	-10
(Hungary) Szentendre KK	3	3	1	2	34	58	-24
(Portugal) CC Oeiras	0	3	0	3	35	57	-22

GROUP B	Pts	P	W	L	PF	PA	DP
(Netherlands) Koog Zaandijk	9	3	3	0	94	32	+62
(England) Trojans	6	3	2	1	55	69	-14
(Germany) Adler Rauxel	3	3	1	2	56	72	-16
(Catalonia) CK Vacarisses	0	3	0	3	45	77	-32

19/1/11	Szentendre KK	16-14	CC Oeiras
19/1/11	R Scaldis SC	37-17	C. Budejovice
20/1/11	R Scaldis SC	22-6	CC Oeiras
20/1/11	Szentendre KK	12-18	C. Budejovice
21/1/11	CC Oeiras	15-19	C. Budejovice
21/1/11	Szentendre KK	6-26	R Scaldis SC

19/1/11	Koog Zaandijk	27-13	Adler Rauxel
19/1/11	CK Vacarisses	17-19	Trojans
20/1/11	Trojans	26-21	Adler Rauxel
20/1/11	Koog Zaandijk	36-9	CK Vacarisses
21/1/11	Koog Zaandijk	31-10	Trojans
21/1/11	CK Vacarisses	19-22	Adler Rauxel

7th-8th places

22/01/11 / CC Oeiras / 19-15 / CK Vacarisses

5th-6th places

22/01/11 / Szentendre KK / 23-12 / Adler Rauxel

3rd-4th places

22/01/11 / C. Budejovice / 19-18 / Trojans

Final

22/01/11 / R Scaldis SC / 23-33 / Koog Zaandijk

== Final standings ==
Final standings
1	Koog Zaandijk
2	R Scaldis SC
3	Ceské Budejovice
4	Trojans
5	Szentendre KK
6	Adler Rauxel
7	CC Oeiras
8	CK Vacarisses
