= 2016–17 England Korfball League =

England Korfball League
- Season: 2016–17
- Champions: Trojans (10th title)
- Matches played: 56
- Goals scored: 2,309 (41.23 per match)
- Top goalscorer: Charlie Vogwill (98 goals)
- Biggest home win: Trojans 46-6 Bearsted (8 January 2017)
- Biggest away win: Bearsted 4-37 Norwich Knights (20 November 2016)
- Highest scoring: Bec 24-31 Trojans (11 December 2016)
- Longest unbeaten run: 11 games Trojans
- Longest winless run: 14 games Bearsted
- All statistics correct as of 9 April 2017.

The 2016–17 England Korfball League season is played with 8 teams. Trojans KC are the defending champions. As there will be an extension of the league from 8 to 10 teams for the 2017–18 season, the last placed team will not be automatically relegated, instead they will go into the Promotion play-offs to fight for another season in the league.

== Teams ==
A total of 8 teams will be taking part in the league: The best six teams from the 2015–16 season and the number 1 and 2 of the 2015-16 promotion/relegation play-offs.

Location of teams outside London:2016-17 England Korfball League
Locations of teams in London:2016-17 England Korfball League

Club	Province	Location	Position in 2015-16
Trojans Korfball Club	Greater London	Croydon	1st
Bec	Greater London	South Croydon	2nd
Bearsted	Kent	Aylesford	2nd in promotion/relegation play-offs
KV	Kent	Aylesford	1st in promotion/relegation play-offs
Nomads	Surrey	Epsom	4th
Kingfishers	Kent	Aylesford	3rd
Tornadoes	Kent	Aylesford	6th
Norwich Knights	Norfolk	Norwich	5th

== Regular Season Table ==
Pos	Team	Pld	W	D	L	GF	GA	GD	Pts	Play-offs or relegation
1	Trojans	14	12	1	1	418	229	+189	25	Final Stages
2	Bec	14	12	0	2	348	216	+132	24	Final Stages
3	Norwich Knights	14	9	1	4	349	254	+95	19	Final Stages
4	Kingfishers	14	7	0	7	268	268	0	14	Final Stages
5	Nomads	14	6	1	7	262	287	−25	13	
6	Tornadoes	14	6	1	7	298	289	+9	13	
7	KV	14	2	0	12	217	339	−122	4	
8	Bearsted	14	0	0	14	157	435	−278	0	promotion / relegation play-off

Updated to match(es) played on 9 April 2017. Source: England Korfball

== Results ==
=== Game-week one ===
13 November 2016	Bearsted	19-22	KV	Aylesford School Sports College
11:20		Report

13 November 2016	Trojans	24-16	Norwich Knights	Trinity School Sports Centre
11:45		Report

13 November 2016	Tornadoes	15-19	Nomads	New Line Learning Academy
12:50		Report

13 November 2016	Kingfishers	12-15	Bec	New Line Learning Academy
14:20		Report

=== Game-week two ===
20 November 2016	Bec	17-10	Tornadoes	Whitgift School
11:35		Report

20 November 2016	Kingfishers	12-30	Trojans	Aylesford School Sports College
11:50		Report

20 November 2016	Bearsted	4-37	Norwich Knights	New Line learning Academy
12:50		Report

20 November 2016	KV	16-23	Nomads	New Line learning Academy
15:50		Report

27 November 2016	Nomads	14-29	Trojans	Epsom College
12:50		Report

=== Game-week three ===
4 December 2016	KV	11-33	Trojans	Aylesford School Sports College
10:50		Report

4 December 2016	Tornadoes	17-33	Norwich Knights	Aylesford School Sports College
12:20		Report

4 December 2016	Bearsted	12-26	Kingfishers	Aylesford School Sports College
15:20		Report

4 December 2016	Bec	22-14	Nomads	Whitgift School
16:45		Report

=== Game-week four ===
11 December 2016	Nomads	18-17	Kingfishers	Epsom College
12:40		Report

11 December 2016	KV	17-21	Norwich Knights	New Line Learning Academy
12:50		Report

11 December 2016	Bec	24-31	Trojans	St Mary's University College
14:30		Report

11 December 2016	Bearsted	6-29	Tornadoes	New Line Learning Academy
15:50		Report

18 December 2016	Kingfishers	23-11	Bearsted	Aylesford School Sports College
13:20		Report

=== Game-week five ===
8 January 2017	Trojans	46-6	Bearsted	Trinity School Sports Centre
11:45		Report

8 January 2017	Nomads	24-24	Norwich Knights	Epsom College
12:40		Report

8 January 2017	Tornadoes	20-21	Kingfishers	New Line Learning Academy
12:50		Report

8 January 2017	KV	10-26	Bec	New Line Learning Academy
15:50		Report

=== Game-week six ===
15 January 2017	Bec	44-11	Bearsted	Trinity School Sports centre
11:35		Report

15 January 2017	Norwich Knights	26-19	Kingfishers	University of East Anglia Sportspark
12:00		Report

15 January 2017	KV	17-36	Tornadoes	New Line Learning Academy
12:50		Report

=== Game-week seven ===
29 January 2017	Trojans	25-25	Tornadoes	Trinity School Sports Centre
11:45		Report

29 January 2017	Bearsted	15-24	Nomads	New Line Learning Academy
12:50		Report

29 January 2017	Kingfishers	18-14	KV	New Line Learning Academy
14:20		Report

=== Game-week eight ===
5 February 2017	Nomads	23-10	Bearsted	Epsom College
11:15		Report

5 February 2017	Tornadoes	20-23	Trojans	New Line learning Academy
12:50		Report

5 February 2017	Bec	21-13	Norwich Knights	Whitgift School
14:15		Report

5 February 2017	KV	15-18	Kingfishers	New Line Learning Academy
14:20		Report

=== Game-week nine ===
12 February 2017	Trojans	31-19	Kingfishers	Trinity School Sports Centre
11:45		Report

12 February 2017	Norwich Knights	34-8	Bearsted	University of East Anglia Sportspark
12:00		Report

12 February 2017	Nomads	25-15	KV	Epsom College
12:50		Report

12 February 2017	Tornadoes	20-33	Bec	New Line learning Academy
12:50		Report

=== Game-week ten ===
19 February 2017	Trojans	23-19	Bec	Trinity School Sports Centre
11:45		Report

19 February 2017	Norwich Knights	28-17	KV	University of East Anglia SportsPark
12:00		Report

19 February 2017	Tornadoes	24-18	Bearsted	New Line Learning Academy
12:50		Report

19 February 2017	Kingfishers	23-11	Nomads	New Line Learning Academy
14:20		Report

4 March 2017	Norwich Knights	22-26	Bec	University of East Anglia SportsPark
17:00		Report

=== Game-week eleven ===
12 March 2017	Trojans	37-17	Nomads	Trinity School Sports centre
11:45		Report

12 March 2017	Kingfishers	25-24	Norwich Knights	Ayelsford School Sports College
12:50		Report

12 March 2017	Bearsted	8-36	Bec	Ayelsford School Sports College
15:50		Report

12 March 2017	Tornadoes	18-14	KV	Ayelsford School Sports College
17:20		Report

=== Game-week twelve ===
19 March 2017	KV	26-20	Bearsted	Ayelsford School Sports College
11:50		Report

19 March 2017	Norwich Knights	24-18	Trojans	University of East Anglia Sportspark
12:00		Report

19 March 2017	Nomads	18-21	Tornadoes	Epsom College
12:50		Report

19 March 2017	Bec	17-15	Kingfishers	Whitgift School
18:45		Report

=== Game-week thirteen ===
26 March 2017	Norwich Knights	22-15	Nomads	University of East Anglia Sportspark
12:00		Report

26 March 2017	Bearsted	9-41	Trojans	New Line Learning Academy
12:50		Report

26 March 2017	Kingfishers	20-24	Tornadoes	New Line Learning Academy
15:40		Report

26 March 2017	Bec	27-10	KV	Whitgift School
19:45		Report

=== Game-week fourteen ===
9 April 2017	Trojans	27-13	KV	Trinity School Sports centre
11:45		Report

9 April 2017	Norwich Knights	27-19	Tornadoes	University of East Anglia Sportspark
12:00		Report

9 April 2017	Nomads	17-21	Bec	Epsom College
12:20		Report

== Final Stages ==
Semi-finals
6 May 2017 -
Trojans	21
Kingfishers	14
6 May 2017 -
Bec	15
Norwich Knights	17

Final
7 May 2017 -
Trojans	30
Norwich Knights	17
Third place
7 May 2017 -
Bec	15
Kingfishers	8

Rank	Team
1st place, gold medalist(s)	Trojans
2nd place, silver medalist(s)	Norwich Knights
3rd place, bronze medalist(s)	Bec
4	Kingfishers

== Top scorers ==
Rank	Player	Club	Goals
1	Charlie Vogwill	Norwich Knights	98
2	David Brooks	Trojans	81
3	Sytze Bijker	Nomads	75
4=	Owen Bailey	Tornadoes	73
4=	Paul Debenham	Norwich Knights	73
5	Sam Brooks	Trojans	69
6	Blake Palfreyman	Bec	64
7	Davesh Patel	Bec	62
8	Andrew Hall	Bec	51
9	Kieron Hicks	Kingfishers	50

Updated to match(es) played on 26 March 2017.

== Squads ==
The players listed are ones that have appeared at least once for the club this season in a league game.

=== Trojans ===
- David Brooks
- Sam Brooks
- Tony Woodvine
- Matt Brooks
- Andrew Bovey
- Jonathan Nickerson
- Clinton Bryan
- Amy Turner
- Stephanie Allen
- Kathryn Goodridge
- Neala Brennan
- Aimee Evans
- Lia Matthews
- Hannah Goodridge
- Laura Pacey

Head Coach: Gary Brooks

=== Bec ===
- Davesh Patel
- Blake Palfreyman
- Andrew Hall
- Joe Bedford
- Ben King
- Billy Ashby
- Hoyei Chow
- Caitlin Fitzgerald
- Sara Roberts
- Ana Rocha
- Helen West
- Jess Bennett
- Rennan Ayres Fonseca
- Amy Swain
- Bethany Penhaligon
- Head coach: Dave Buckland

=== Bearsted ===
- Chris Martin
- Will Alderton
- Zach Catterall
- Karl Sieber
- David Wiseman
- Rob Haggart
- Chris Beale
- Tom Sandow
- John Haggart
- Owen Mansfield
- Sarah Munro
- Emma Sackett
- Ayishah Chaudry
- Holly Sackett
- Emma Hind
- Emma Stanley
- Alicia Nolan
- Rebecca Thornberg
- Head coach: Alexander Sieber

=== Kingfishers ===
- Kieron Hicks
- John Denton
- Tom Woolmer
- Ryan Medhurst
- Luke Francis
- Liam Geddes
- Adam Hall
- Liam Kirby
- Ross Carr-Taylor
- Saskia Carr-Taylor
- Lauren Hall
- Shannon Jones
- Mallory Gore
- Kenzie Baldock
- Rebecca Stone
- Ruth Austin
- Rachel Turner
- Head coach: Ross Carr-Taylor

=== Tornadoes ===
- Owen Bailey
- Dan Brown
- Shane Buckland
- Jacob Dawes
- Josh Mclellan
- Jamie Buck
- Eleanor Parker
- Elise Sparks
- Ashley Warner
- Bethany Mclellan
- Alix Richardson
- Corinne Buckland
- Alexandra Derham
- Head coach: Corinne Buckland

=== Nomads ===
- Sytze Bijker
- Dinos Tritsarolis
- Ean Irwin
- Alex Bell
- Nikesh Patel
- Alex Smith
- Ben Rivers
- Simon Cole
- Olly Bell
- Emma Cole
- Heather Ikwuemesi
- Amy Smith
- Sam Rowbottom
- Tamika Zilm
- Emma Thornberg
- Hannah Lorrimer
- Anna Osbourne
- Abby Golding
- Carina Lamelas

Head Coach: Peter Teague

=== Norwich Knights ===
- Charlie Vogwill
- Stan Dunn
- Paul Debenham
- Josh Rowe
- James Seymour
- Luke McKenzie
- Frank Dunn
- Claire Dique
- Lizzie McCloud
- Heather Stokes
- Anna Woodall
- Joanna Cook
- Emily Cocker
- Rachel Burt
- Adele Mitchell
- Head coach: Joe Stirling

=== KV ===
- Rob Williams
- Dan Howard
- Luke Flanagan
- Flynn Picot
- James Summers
- Thomas Holder
- Robert Summers
- Alice Arnold
- Annie Boyd
- Kirsty Aldridge
- Jo Hickey
- Ellie Summers
- Dot Mcadam
- Trudy Parker
- Sam Medcraft
- Head coach: Rob Williams
