= Bonson =

Bonson may refer to:

== People ==
- Bonson (surname)

== Places ==
- Bonson, Alpes-Maritimes, a commune in the department of Alpes-Maritimes, France
- Bonson, Loire, a commune in the department of Loire, France
- Bonson, Somerset, a village in Somerset, United Kingdom

== See also ==
- FJEP Bonson, korfball club
