= 2018–19 England Korfball League =

England Korfball League
- Season: 2018–19

The 2018–19 England Korfball League season is played with 10 teams. Trojans KC are the defending korfball champions.

== Teams ==
The league will be played with 10 teams. The teams that have finished from 1st to 9th place as of 19 April 2018 in the 2017–18 season qualified for the 2018/19 season. The remaining place was filled by Bristol Thunder who won the Promotion Play-off.

Location of teams outside London:2016-17 England Korfball League
Locations of teams in London:2017-18 England Korfball League

| Club | Province | Location | Position in 2017-18 |
|---|---|---|---|
| Trojans Korfball Club | Greater London | Croydon | 1st |
| Bec | Greater London | South Croydon | 2nd |
| KV | Kent | Aylesford | 6th |
| Nomads | Surrey | Epsom | 7th |
| Kingfishers | Kent | Aylesford | 5th |
| Tornadoes | Kent | Aylesford | 3rd |
| Norwich Knights | Norfolk | Norwich | 4th |
| Cambridge Tigers | Cambridgeshire | Cambridge | 8th |
| Birmingham City | West Midlands | Birmingham | 9th |
| Bristol Thunder | Bristol | Bristol | 1st in Promotion Play-offs |

== Regular season table ==
| Pos | Team | Pld | W | D | L | GF | GA | GD | Pts | Play-offs or relegation |
|---|---|---|---|---|---|---|---|---|---|---|
| 1 | Bec | 0 | 0 | 0 | 0 | 0 | 0 | 0 | 0 | Final Stages |
| 2 | Birmingham City | 0 | 0 | 0 | 0 | 0 | 0 | 0 | 0 | Final Stages |
| 3 | Bristol Thunder | 0 | 0 | 0 | 0 | 0 | 0 | 0 | 0 | Final Stages |
| 4 | Cambridge Tigers | 0 | 0 | 0 | 0 | 0 | 0 | 0 | 0 | Final Stages |
| 5 | Kingfishers | 0 | 0 | 0 | 0 | 0 | 0 | 0 | 0 | |
| 6 | KV | 0 | 0 | 0 | 0 | 0 | 0 | 0 | 0 | |
| 7 | Nomads | 0 | 0 | 0 | 0 | 0 | 0 | 0 | 0 | |
| 8 | Norwich Knights | 0 | 0 | 0 | 0 | 0 | 0 | 0 | 0 | |
| 9 | Tornadoes | 0 | 0 | 0 | 0 | 0 | 0 | 0 | 0 | |
| 10 | Trojans | 0 | 0 | 0 | 0 | 0 | 0 | 0 | 0 | Relegation |

Updated to match(es) played on unknown. Source: England Korfball
