= 2015–16 Korfball League & Promotion Division promotion/relegation play-off =

Promotion / Relegation play-off
- Season: 2015–16
- Champions: KV (1st); Bearsted (2nd)
- Promoted: KV (1st) Bearsted (2nd)
- Matches played: 10
- Goals scored: 214 (21.4 per match)

The 2015–16 Korfball League & Promotion Division promotion/relegation play-off is played between the number 9 of the England Korfball League and the top two teams of the Promotion Division North & West and South & East. In North & West Bristol Thunder and Birmingham City qualified. In South & East Bearsted and Cambridge Tigers qualified. KV (1st) and Bearsted (2nd) both were promoted to the England Korfball League 2016-17 Season starting in November 2016.

== Teams ==
A total of 5 teams will be taking part in the play-off.

Location of teams in promotion / relegation play-off

Club	Province	Location	Position in 2015-16
Bristol Thunder	Bristol	Bristol	1st Promotion Division (North & West)
Birmingham City	West Midlands	Birmingham	2nd Promotion Division (North & West)
Bearsted	Kent	Aylesford	1st Promotion Division (South & East)
Cambridge Tigers	Cambridgeshire	Cambridge	2nd Promotion Division (South & East)
KV	Kent	Aylesford	7th England Korfball League

== Table ==
Pos	Team	Pld	W	D	L	GF	GA	GD	Pts	Premier League or relegation
1	KV	4	4	0	0	55	28	+27	8	Promotion
2	Bearsted	4	2	0	2	49	46	+3	4	Promotion
3	Cambridge Tigers	4	1	1	2	39	50	−11	3	Relegation
4	Birmingham City	4	1	1	2	34	46	−12	3	Relegation
5	Bristol Thunder	4	1	0	3	37	44	−7	2	Relegation

Updated to match(es) played on 1 May 2016. Source: England Korfball

== Results ==
=== Day 1 ===
30 April 2016
9:40

KV	15-8	Cambridge Tigers

Whitgift School

30 April 2016
10:40

Bristol Thunder	9-11	Birmingham City

Whitgift School

30 April 2016
11:40

Cambridge Tigers	16-14	Bearsted

Whitgift School

30 April 2016
12:40

Bristol Thunder	7-12	KV

Whitgift School

30 April 2016
13:40

Bearsted	15-10	Birmingham City

Whitgift School

=== Day 2 ===
1 May 2016
9:30

Birmingham City	6-15	KV

Whitgift School

1 May 2016
10:40

Cambridge Tigers	8-14	Bristol Thunder

Whitgift School

1 May 2016
11:30

KV	13-7	Bearsted

Whitgift School

1 May 2016
12:30

Birmingham City	7-7	Cambridge Tigers

Whitgift School

1 May 2016
13:30

Bearsted	13-7	Bristol Thunder

Whitgift School

== Controversies ==
In the last 60 seconds of a tense game between Birmingham City and Cambridge Tigers with the score level at 6-6. Birmingham needed a win for a small chance of promotion, a Cambridge win would give them almost certain promotion to the EKL. Cambridge won a free-pass, which was missed however, followed up by a running in shot by Josh Dawes, giving them the lead. With 30 seconds to go, Birmingham were awarded a penalty which was missed. With 6 seconds to go Cambridge, having collected the missed penalty, were passing the ball out of defence and the referee called up for time wasting, the clock then stopped at 3 seconds, which allowed Birmingham to take an instant shot which was scored by Jess Beale to level the match. The match finished 7-7, therefore giving Bearsted a chance to secure a place in next seasons EKL, they went on to beat Bristol Thunder 13-7 in their final game, promoting them.
