= UKSA =

UKSA may refer to:

== United Kingdom ==
- UK Statistics Authority, the board which assures the quality of official statistics
- UK Space Agency, an agency of the government
- UKSA (maritime charity) (previously called UK Sailing Academy), in Cowes, England
- UK Shareholders Association, which represents private shareholders

== Elsewhere ==
- Unió Korfbalera Sant Adrià de Besòs, the korfbal team of Sant Adrià de Besòs city, Catalonia, Spain
