= Bonzon =

Bonzon is a surname. Notable people with the surname include:

- Annick Bonzon (born 1971), Swiss alpine skier
- Paul-Jacques Bonzon (1908–1978), French writer

== See also ==
- Bonson (surname)
