= 2021 IKF European Korfball A-Championship =

2021 European Korfball A-Championship
Tournament details
- Host country: Belgium
- City: Antwerp
- Dates: 25 to 30 October 2021
- Teams: 8
- Venue(s): 2

Final positions
- Champions: Netherlands (8th title)
- Runners-up: Belgium
- Third place: Germany
- Fourth place: England

Tournament statistics
- Matches played: 20
- Goals scored: 619 (30.95 per match)

The 2021 European Korfball A-Championship was held in Belgium from 25 to 30 October 2021. Matches was played in Antwerp. It was the second edition where the European Korfball Championship is split into an A-Championship and a B-Championship. The tournament served as a qualifier for the 2023 IKF World Korfball Championship.

== Qualified teams ==
Team	Method of qualification	Date of qualification	Finals appearance	Previous appearance
Belgium	2018 IKF European Korfball A-Championship Top 8 finish	15 October 2018	8th	2018
Catalonia	2018 IKF European Korfball A-Championship Top 8 finish	15 October 2018	7th	2018
Netherlands	2018 IKF European Korfball A-Championship Top 8 finish	14 October 2018	8th	2018
Portugal	2018 IKF European Korfball A-Championship Top 8 finish	15 October 2018	7th	2018
Germany	2018 IKF European Korfball A-Championship Top 8 finish	14 October 2018	8th	2018
England	2018 IKF European Korfball A-Championship Top 8 finish	15 October 2018	8th	2018
Czech Republic	2018 IKF European Korfball A-Championship Top 8 finish	16 October 2018	8th	2018
Hungary	2018 IKF European Korfball A-Championship Top 8 finish	16 October 2018	6th	2018

1. includes participations of Great Britain until 2006.
2. During the 2018 edition, Hungary took part in the B-Championship, held at the same time as the A-Championship. Mid-way through the tournament, an intermediate round was held in which Hungary beat Poland to take its place in the A-Championship. This is counted as well as a participation.

== Venues ==
All group stages matches were organized at Boeckenberg Sportcenter in Deurne. Knockout stage matches were organized in the Lotto Arena in Merksem.

== Group stage ==
=== Group A ===
Pos	Team	Pld	W	OTW	OTL	L	GF	GA	GD	Pts
1	Netherlands	3	3	0	0	0	99	23	+76	9
2	England	3	2	0	0	1	39	51	−12	6
3	Portugal	3	1	0	0	2	37	58	−21	3
4	Hungary	3	0	0	0	3	31	74	−43	0

Source: IKF

25 October 2021
15:00

Portugal	19–13	Hungary
	Report

25 October 2021
17:30

Netherlands	29–9	England
	Report

26 October 2021
14:00

England	16–10	Hungary
	Report

26 October 2021
15:45

Portugal	6–31	Netherlands
	Report

27 October 2021
17:30

England	14–12	Portugal
	Report

27 October 2021
19:15

Hungary	8–39	Netherlands
	Report

=== Group B ===
Pos	Team	Pld	W	OTW	OTL	L	GF	GA	GD	Pts
1	Belgium	3	3	0	0	0	75	13	+62	9
2	Germany	3	2	0	0	1	51	51	0	6
3	Czech Republic	3	1	0	0	2	37	59	−22	3
4	Catalonia	3	0	0	0	3	32	72	−40	0

Source: IKF

25 October 2021
15:45

Germany	25–14	Catalonia
	Report

25 October 2021
19:45

Belgium	23–5	Czech Republic
	Report

26 October 2021
17:30

Czech Republic	18–17	Catalonia
	Report

26 October 2021
19:15

Belgium	23–7	Germany
	Report

27 October 2021
14:00

Czech Republic	14–19	Germany
	Report

27 October 2021
15:45

Belgium	29–1	Catalonia
	Report

== Knockout stage ==
Semi-finals
29 October – Antwerp
Netherlands	38
Germany	8
29 October – Antwerp
Belgium	24
England	12

Final
30 October – Antwerp
Netherlands	21
Belgium	17
Third place play-off
30 October – Antwerp
Germany	13
England	11

=== Classification 5th-8th place ===
5th-8th place
29 October – Antwerp
Portugal	20
Catalonia	10
29 October – Antwerp
Czech Republic	14
Hungary	16

5th place
30 October – Antwerp
Portugal	11
Hungary	10
7th place
30 October – Antwerp
Catalonia	14
Czech Republic	16

== Final standing ==
Rank	Team
1st place, gold medalist(s)	Netherlands
2nd place, silver medalist(s)	Belgium
3rd place, bronze medalist(s)	Germany
4	England
5	Portugal
6	Hungary
7	Czech Republic
8	Catalonia
