= Catalonia national korfball team =

Catalonia
- Association: Federació Catalana de Korfbal
- IKF membership: 1997
- IKF code: CAT (Catalonia)
- IKF rank: 5 (Jan.2025)

World Championships
- Appearances: 7
- First appearance: 1999
- Best result: 4th place, 2011

European Championships
- Appearances: 7
- First appearance: 2002
- Best result: 3rd place, 2016

European Bowl
- Appearances: 1
- First appearance: 2005
- Best result: Champions, 2005
- http://www.korfbal.cat/

The Catalonia national korfball team (Catalan: Selecció catalana de corfbol) is managed by the Federació Catalana de Korfball (FCK), representing Catalonia in korfball international competitions.

Catalonia won the European Bowl in 2005. Their best performance in the World Championships was in 2011, with the 4th place.

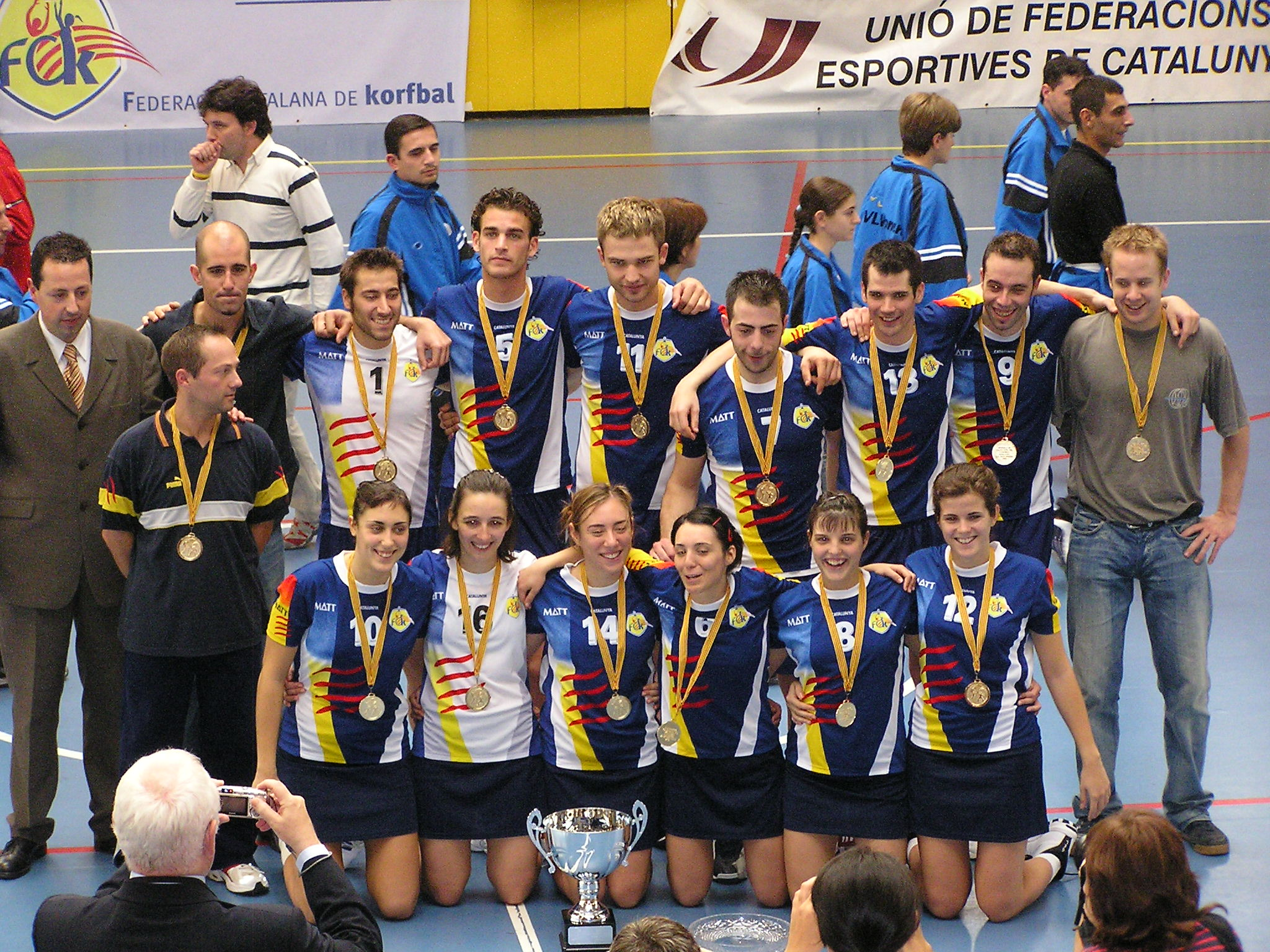
European Bowl 2005 Champions

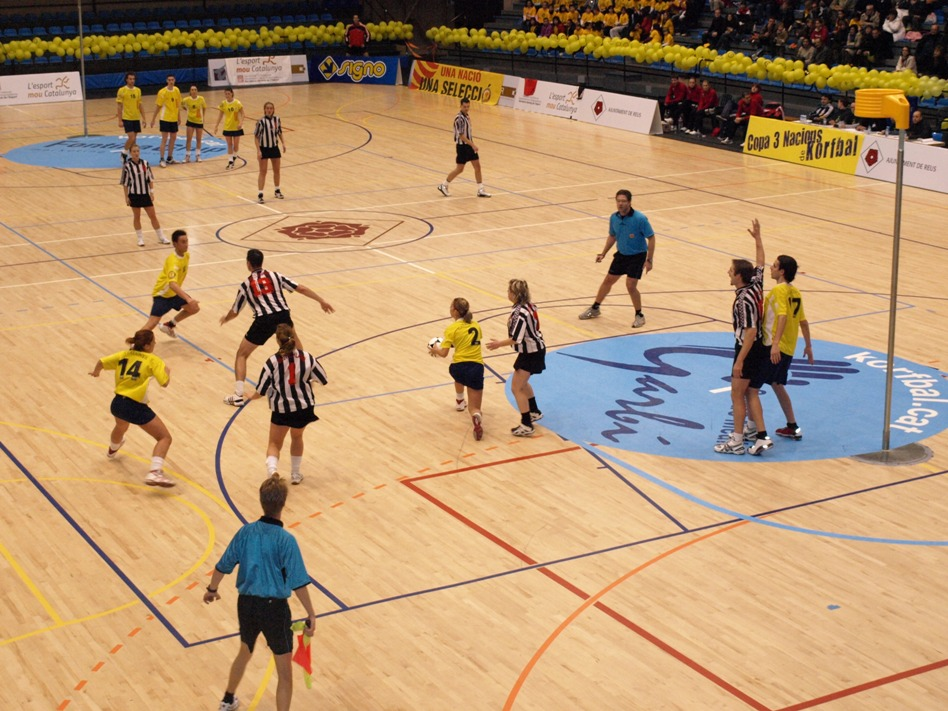
Catalonia ina. Game against Germany, 2008

== Tournament history ==
World Championships
Year	Championship	Host	Classification
1999	6th World Championship	Adelaide (Australia)	8th place
2003	7th World Championship	Rotterdam (The Netherlands)	9th place
2007	8th World Championship	Brno (Czech Republic)	9th place
2011	9th World Championship	Shaoxing (China)	4th place
2015	10th World Championship	Antwerp (Belgium)	5th place
2019	11th World Championship	Durban (South Africa)	10th place
2023	12th World Championship	Taipei (Taiwan)	10th place

European Championships
Year	Championship	Host	Classification
2002	2nd European Championship	(Catalonia)	7th place
2006	3rd European Championship	Budapest (Hungary)	6th place
2010	4th European Championship	(Netherlands)	5th place
2016	6th European Championship	Dordrecht (Netherlands)	3rd place
2018	7th European Championship	Friesland (Netherlands)	6th place
2021	8th European Championship	Antwerp (Belgium)	8th place
2024	9th European Championship	Calonge i Sant Antoni (Catalonia)	4th place

European Bowl
Year	Championship	Host	Classification
2005	1st European Bowl	Terrassa (Catalonia)	Champions

== Current squad ==
National team in the 2011 World Championship

- Raquel Varela (CK Vacarisses)
- Montse Cortés (CK Vacarisses)
- Marta Flores (CK Vacarisses)
- Vanesa Viana (CK Vacarisses)
- Laia Rosa (CK Vallparadís)
- Miriam González (CK Vallparadís)
- Berta Alomà (KC Sant Cugat)
- Albert Camprubí (CK Castellbisbal)
- Óscar Hernández (CK Vacarisses)
- Xavi Blàzquez (CK Vallparadís)
- Ivan Alberich (CE Vilanova)
- José M. Álvarez (CK Montcada)
- Sergi Gabriel (CE Vilanova)
- Marc Castillo (CK Montcada)
- Coach: Tilbert la Haye
- 2nd coach: Rosendo Garcia

National team in the 2007 World Championships

- Montse Cortés
- Marta Flores
- Alba Juncosa
- Susana Jurado
- Lidia Soriano
- Raquel Varela
- Cristina Visconti
- Xavi Blázquez
- Jordi Díaz
- Alexis Escardibul
- Jose Luis Jurado
- Luis Rosa
- Xavi Vidal
- Daniel Vidaña
- Coach: Tilbert la Haye
- 2nd coach: Rosendo Garcia
