= 2018 IKF European Korfball A-Championship =

2018 European Korfball A-Championship
Tournament details
- Host country: Netherlands
- City: Drachten, Gorredijk, Heerenveen and Leeuwarden
- Dates: 13 to 21 October 2018
- Teams: 8
- Venue(s): 4

Final positions
- Champions: Netherlands (7th title)
- Runners-up: Germany
- Third place: Portugal
- Fourth place: Belgium

The 2018 European Korfball A-Championship will be held in the Netherlands from 13 to 21 October 2018. Matches will be played in Drachten, Gorredijk, Heerenveen and Leeuwarden. It will be the first edition where the European Korfball Championship is split into an A-Championship and a B-Championship, with the idea that a certain number of teams will relegate from the A-Championship to the B-Championship after each edition, and a certain number of teams from the B-Championship will be promoted. Whether this will be a direct promotion or relegation, or whether play-offs will need to be played, is yet to be determined.

== Qualified teams ==
| Team | Method of qualification | Date of qualification | Finals appearance | Previous appearance |
|---|---|---|---|---|
| Belgium | 2016 IKF European Korfball Championship Semi-finalist | 25 October 2016 | 7th | 2016 |
| Catalonia | 2016 IKF European Korfball Championship Semi-finalist | 26 October 2016 | 6th | 2016 |
| Netherlands | 2016 IKF European Korfball Championship Semi-finalist | 25 October 2016 | 7th | 2016 |
| Portugal | 2016 IKF European Korfball Championship Semi-finalist | 26 October 2016 | 6th | 2016 |
| Germany | 2016 IKF European Korfball Championship 5th place | 28 October 2016 | 7th | 2016 |
| England | 2016 IKF European Korfball Championship 6th place | 28 October 2016 | 7th | 2016 |
| Czech Republic | 2016 IKF European Korfball Championship 7th place | 28 October 2016 | 7th | 2016 |
| Poland | 2016 IKF European Korfball Championship 9th place | 21 March 2018 | 6th | 2016 |

1. includes participations of Great Britain until 2006.
2. originally Russia qualified for the tournament, however on 21 March 2018 the news was released they would not participate, allowing Poland to take its place.

== Group stage ==
=== Group A ===
| Pos | Team | Pld | W | OTW | OTL | L | GF | GA | GD | Pts |
|---|---|---|---|---|---|---|---|---|---|---|
| 1 | Netherlands | 3 | 3 | 0 | 0 | 0 | 102 | 35 | +67 | 9 |
| 2 | Catalonia | 3 | 2 | 0 | 0 | 1 | 44 | 59 | −15 | 6 |
| 3 | England | 3 | 1 | 0 | 0 | 2 | 44 | 58 | −14 | 3 |
| 4 | Poland | 3 | 0 | 0 | 0 | 3 | 32 | 70 | −38 | 0 |

Source: IKF

| Team 1 | Score | Team 2 |
|---|---|---|
| England | 17 − 9 | Poland |
| Netherlands | 31 − 13 | Catalonia |
| Netherlands | 31 − 10 | England |
| Poland | 11 − 13 | Catalonia |
| Catalonia | 18 − 17 | England |
| Netherlands | 40 − 12 | Poland |

=== Group B ===
| Pos | Team | Pld | W | OTW | OTL | L | GF | GA | GD | Pts |
|---|---|---|---|---|---|---|---|---|---|---|
| 1 | Germany | 3 | 3 | 0 | 0 | 0 | 58 | 50 | +8 | 9 |
| 2 | Belgium | 3 | 2 | 0 | 0 | 1 | 71 | 48 | +23 | 6 |
| 3 | Portugal | 3 | 1 | 0 | 0 | 2 | 56 | 64 | −8 | 3 |
| 4 | Czech Republic | 3 | 0 | 0 | 0 | 3 | 40 | 63 | −23 | 0 |

Source: IKF

| Team 1 | Score | Team 2 |
|---|---|---|
| Germany | 17 − 16 | Portugal |
| Belgium | 18 − 12 | Czech Republic |
| Germany | 20 − 18 | Belgium |
| Portugal | 24 − 12 | Czech Republic |
| Czech Republic | 16 − 21 | Germany |
| Belgium | 35 − 16 | Portugal |

== Intermediate stage ==
Following the group stage, an intermediate round is held, featuring the teams finishing in last place during the group stage and the group winners of the B-Championship. The winners will continue in the A-Championship knockout stage, the losers move to the B-Championship knockout stage. As 10 nations from Europe qualify for the 2019 IKF World Korfball Championship, the winners of these matches qualified for the 2019 IKF World Korfball Championship by virtue of being sure to finish in the top 8. The losing teams might still qualify.

16 October 2018
18:15

| Hungary | 17 − 16 | Poland |
|---|---|---|
| | Report |

Gorredijk

16 October 2018
20:00

| Czech Republic | 33 − 12 | Slovakia |
|---|---|---|
| | Report |

Gorredijk

== Knockout stage ==
Fifth place
Czech Republic | 20
Catalonia | 17
Seventh place
England | 19
Hungary | 11

Consolation semifinals
Czech Republic | 16
England | 15
Catalonia | 22
Hungary | 17

Quarterfinals
Netherlands | 35
Czech Republic | 10
England | 17
Belgium | 22
Catalonia | 13
Portugal | 21
Hungary | 17
Germany | 20

Semifinals
Netherlands | 22
Belgium | 9
Portugal | 10
Germany | 20

Final
Netherlands | 21
Germany | 8
Third place
Belgium | 19
Portugal | 20

== Final standing ==
All teams qualify for both the 2019 IKF World Korfball Championship and the 2021 IKF European Korfball A-Championship.

| Rank | Team |
|---|---|
| 1st place, gold medalist(s) | Netherlands |
| 2nd place, silver medalist(s) | Germany |
| 3rd place, bronze medalist(s) | Portugal |
| 4 | Belgium |
| 5 | Czech Republic |
| 6 | Catalonia |
| 7 | England |
| 8 | Hungary |
