= Korfball Europa Shield =

Korfball club competition

The Europa Shield was an annual korfball club competition run by the International Korfball Federation from 2001 till 2020. Clubs qualified for this competition based on their performance in their national leagues. Included were the second and third classified for the "B" countries and the first classified for "C" countries. It was the second-tier competition of European korfball clubs, ranking below the Europa Cup. In January 2022, the IKF announced that the IKF Europa Cup and IKF Europa Shield would be replaced by the IKF Europe Korfball Champions League for the 2022–23 season.

== Results ==
Europa Shield
Year	Host	Champion	2nd place	3rd place
2001	Chatham (GBR)	(Czech Republic) České Budějovice	(United Kingdom) Invicta	(Germany) Adler Rauxel
2002	Bergisch Gladbach (GER)	(Czech Republic) MS YMCA Znojmo	(Germany) Grün-Weiss	(Hungary) MAFC Budapest
2003	Třeboň (CZE)	(Czech Republic) Havířov	(Czech Republic) MS YMCA Znojmo	(England) Mitcham
2004	Szentendre (HUN)	(Czech Republic) MS YMCA Znojmo	(Germany) Adler Rauxel	(Germany) Albatros
2005	Croydon (GBR)	(England) Mitcham	(Germany) Selmer KV	(Hungary) Szentendre
2006	Selm (GER)	(Czech Republic) TJ Znojmo	(Germany) Selmer KV	(Germany) Adler Rauxel
2007	Vilanova i la Geltrú (CAT)	(England) Trojans	(Catalonia) CK Vallparadís	(Catalonia) CEVG
2009	Terrassa (CAT)	(Catalonia) CK Vallparadís	(Catalonia) CEVG	(England) Mitcham
2010	Százhalombatta (HUN)	(Portugal) NC Benfica	(Czech Republic) VKC Kolín	(Catalonia) CEVG
2011	Warsaw (POL)	(Catalonia) CK Vallparadís	(Germany) Schweriner KC	(Portugal) NC Benfica
2012	Castrop-Rauxel (GER)	(Czech Republic) České Budějovice	(Germany) Schweriner KC	(England) Nottingham KC
2013	Třeboň (CZE)	(Catalonia) CK Vallparadís	(Germany) Adler Rauxel	(Czech Republic) Brno KK
2014	Barcelona (CAT)	(Catalonia) CEVG (CE Vilanova i la Geltrú)	(Catalonia) CK Vallparadís	(Germany) Schweriner KC
2015	Bergisch Gladbach (GER)	(England) Bec Korfball Club	(Germany) SG Pegasus Rommerscheid ’91 e.V.	(Portugal) CCCD Carnaxide
2016	Castrop-Rauxel (GER)	(Catalonia) KC Barcelona	(England) Bec Korfball Club	(Germany) Schweriner KC
2017	Odivelas (POR)	(England) Bec Korfball Club	(Germany) Schweriner KC	(Portugal) CC Quinta Dos Lombos
2018	Odivelas (POR)	(Germany) Adler Rauxel KV	(England) Bec Korfball Club	(Czech Republic) Brno KK
2019	Prostějov (CZE)	(England) Bec Korfball Club	(Czech Republic) České Budějovice	(Czech Republic) SK Rg Prostějov
2020	Bergisch Gladbach (GER)	(England) Bec Korfball Club	(Catalonia) CK Vallparadís	(Germany) KV Adler Rauxel

== Medals (2001-2020) ==
Rank	Nation	Gold	Silver	Bronze	Total
1	Czech Republic	6	3	3	12
1	England	6	3	3	12
3	Catalonia	5	4	2	11
4	Germany	1	9	6	16
5	Portugal	1	0	3	4
6	Hungary	0	0	2	2
Totals (6 entries)		19	19	19	57

== Alltime club ranking ==
	Titles	Runners-up	Third place
(England) Bec Korfball Club	4	2	—
(Catalonia) CK Vallparadís	3	3	—
(Czech Republic) TJ Znojmo	3	1	—
(Czech Republic) České Budějovice	2	1	—
(Germany) Adler Rauxel	1	2	3
(Catalonia) CEVG	1	1	2
(England) Mitcham	1	—	2
(Portugal) NC Benfica	1	—	1
(Czech Republic) Havířov	1	—	—
(Catalonia) KC Barcelona	1	—	—
(England) Trojans	1	—	—
(Germany) Schweriner KC	—	3	2
(Germany) Selmer KV	—	2	—
(Germany) Grün-Weiss	—	1	—
(United Kingdom) Invicta	—	1	—
(Germany) Pegasus	—	1	—
(Czech Republic) VKC Kolin	—	1	—
(Czech Republic) Brno KK	—	—	2
(Germany) Albatros	—	—	1
(Portugal) CCCD Carnaxide	—	—	1
(Hungary) MAFC Budapest	—	—	1
(England) Nottingham KC	—	—	1
(Czech Republic) SK Rg Prostějov	—	—	1
(Hungary) Szentendre	—	—	1
(Portugal) CRC Quinta dos Lombos	—	—	1

== Alltime country ranking ==
Performance by nation
Nation	Winners	Runners-up	Third place
Czech Republic	6	3	3
England	5	3	3
Catalonia	5	3	2
Germany	1	9	5
Portugal	1	0	2
Hungary	0	0	2

== Europa Shield standings ==
Europa Shield 2020 19th Europa Shield in Bergisch Gladbach (Germany)

Final standings:

1. Bec Korfball Club (ENG)
2. CK Vallparadis / Assessoria KC (CAT)
3. Adler Rauxel (GER)
4. Brno KK (CZE)
5. TuS Schildgen (GER)
6. Kocaeli University Sport Club (TUR)
7. Grupo Desportivo dos Bons Dias (POR)
8. KS Defenders Korfball Wroclaw (POL)

Europa Shield 2019 18th Europa Shield in Prostějov (Czech Republic)

Final standings:

1. Bec Korfball Club (ENG)
2. České Budějovice (KCC SOKOL) (CZE)
3. SK RG Prostějov (CZE)
4. CK Vallparadis / Assessoria KC (CAT)
5. Grupo Desportivo dos Bons Dias (POR)
6. Schweriner KC (GER)
7. Szentendre Kinizsi Honvéd SE (HUN)
8. Haydarpasa Lisesi Sport Club (TUR)

Europa Shield 2018 17th Europa Shield in Odivelas (Portugal)

Final standings:

1. Bec Korfball Club (ENG)
2. KV Adler Rauxel (GER)
3. Brno KK (CZE)
4. Norwich Knights KC (ENG)
5. Barcelona KC (ESP)
6. Marmara University Sport Club (TUR)
7. Korf LX Project (POR)
8. CRC Quinta dos Lombos (POR)

Europa Shield 2017 16th Europa Shield in Odivelas (Portugal)

Final standings:

1. Bec Korfball Club (ENG)
2. Schweriner KC (GER)
3. CRC Quinta dos Lombos (POR)
4. Club Korfbal Montcada (CAT)
5. SG Pegasus (GER)
6. KC Barcelona (CAT)
7. České Budějovice (CZE)
8. CCCD Carnaxide (POR)

Europa Shield 2016 15th Europa Shield in Castrop-Rauxel (Germany)

Final standings:

1. KC Barcelona (CAT)
2. Bec Korfball Club (ENG)
3. Schweriner KC (GER)
4. 1908 SZAC KSE (HUN)
5. CCCD Carnaxide (POR)
6. Club Korfbal Castellbisbal (CAT)
7. TJ Znojmo MS YMCA (CZE)
8. TuS Schildgen (GER)

Europa Shield 2015 14th Europa Shield in Bergisch Gladbach (Germany)

Final standings:

1. Bec Korfball Club (ENG)
2. SG Pegasus (GER)
3. CCCD Carnaxide (POR)
4. VKC Kolin (CZE)
5. TuS Schildgen (GER)
6. 1908 SZAC KSE (HUN)
7. KC Barcelona (CAT)
8. Marmara University Sports Club (TUR)

Europa Shield 2014 13th Europa Shield in Barcelona (Spain)

Final standings:

1. CEVG (CE Vilanova i la Geltrú ) (CAT)
2. CK Vallparadís (CAT)
3. Schweriner KC (GER)
4. CCCD (POR)
5. KV Adler Rauxel (GER)
6. Brno KK (CZE)
7. Kingfisher KC (ENG)
8. Szentendrei KK (HUN)

Europa Shield 2013 12th Europa Shield in Třeboň (Czech Republic), January 25–27

Final standings:

1. CK Vallparadís (CAT)
2. Adler Rauxel (GER)
3. Brno KK (CZE)
4. VKC Kolin (CZE)
5. Nottingham KC (ENG)
6. Obudai KK (HUN)
7. Cascais CC (POR)
8. AZS Wroclaw (POL)

Europa Shield 2012 11th Europa Shield in Castrop-Rauxel (Germany), January 27–29

Final standings:

1. České Budějovice (CZE)
2. Schweriner KC (GER)
3. Nottingham KC (ENG)
4. SG Pegasus (GER)
5. CE Vilanova i la Geltrú (CAT)
6. Budapest MAFC (HUN)
7. CCCD Carnaxide (POR)
8. AZS Wroclaw (POL)

Europa Shield 2011 10th Europa Shield in Warsaw (Poland), January 28–30

Final standings:

1. CK Vallparadís (CAT)
2. Schweriner KC (GER)
3. NC Benfica (POR)
4. Brno KK (CZE)
5. Obudai KK (HUN)
6. Mega Sports Warsaw (POL)
7. Nomads (ENG)
8. Nottingham KC (ENG)

Europa Shield 2010 9th Europa Shield in Százhalombatta (Hungary), January 23–24

Final standings:

1. NC Benfica (POR)
2. VKC Kolín (CZE)
3. CE Vilanova i la Geltrú (CAT)
4. Kwiek KC (ENG)
5. Mitcham KC (ENG)
6. BKK Kenguruk (HUN)
7. TuS Schildgen (GER)
8. AZS Wroclaw (POL)

Europa Shield 2009 8th Europa Shield in Terrassa (Spain), January 24–25

Final standings:

1. CK Vallparadís (CAT)
2. CE Vilanova i la Geltrú (CAT)
3. Mitcham KC (ENG)
4. Nottingham KC (ENG)
5. TuS Schildgen (GER)
6. Grün-Weiss (GER)
7. Cascais CC (POR)

Europa Shield 2007 7th Europa Shield in Vilanova i la Geltrú (Spain), September 29–30

Final standings:

1. Trojans (ENG)
2. Assessoria Vallparadís (CAT)
3. CEVG Stirling (CAT)
4. Selmer KV (GER)
5. Kwiek (ENG)
6. MAFC Budapest (HUN)

Europa Shield 2006 6th Europa Shield in Selm (Germany), September 30-October 1

Final standings:

1. TJ Znojmo (CZE)
2. Selmer KV (GER)
3. Adler Rauxel (GER)
4. VKC Kolin (CZE)
5. Trojans (ENG)
6. MAFC (HUN)
7. Invicta Sharks (GBR)
8. CK Badalona (CAT)

Europa Shield 2005 5th Europa Shield in Croydon (Great Britain), October 7–8

Final standings:

1. Mitcham (ENG)
2. Selmer KV (GER)
3. Szentendre (HUN)
4. Grün-Weiss (GER)
5. České Budějovice (CZE)
6. Trojans (ENG)

Europa Shield 2004 4th Europa Shield in Szentendre (Hungary), October 9–10

Final standings:

1. MS YMCA Znojmo (CZE)
2. Adler Rauxel (GER)
3. Albatros (GER)
4. Invicta KC (GBR)
5. Sant Llorenç KC (CAT)
6. Havířov (CZE)
7. Croydon (ENG)
8. Szentendre KK (HUN)

Europa Shield 2003 3rd Europa Shield in Třeboň (Czech Republic), October 4–6

Final standings:

1. Havířov (CZE)
2. MS YMCA Znojmo (CZE)
3. Mitcham (ENG)
4. Szentendre (HUN)
5. Albatros (GER)
6. Grün-Weiss (GER)
7. Trojans (ENG)

Europa Shield 2002 2nd Europa Shield in Bergisch Gladbach (Germany), September 28–29

Final standings:

1. MS YMCA Znojmo (CZE)
2. Grün-Weiss (GER)
3. MAFC Budapest (HUN)
4. TuS Schildgen (GER)
5. Mitcham (ENG)
6. La Maurina (CAT)
7. Nomads (GBR)

Europa Shield 2001 1st Europa Shield in Chatham (Great Britain), October 20–21

Final standings:

1. České Budějovice (CZE)
2. Invicta (GBR)
3. Adler Rauxel (GER)
4. VKC Kolin (CZE)
5. TuS Schildgen (GER)
6. Nomads (GBR)
