= Vacarisses =

- Municipality
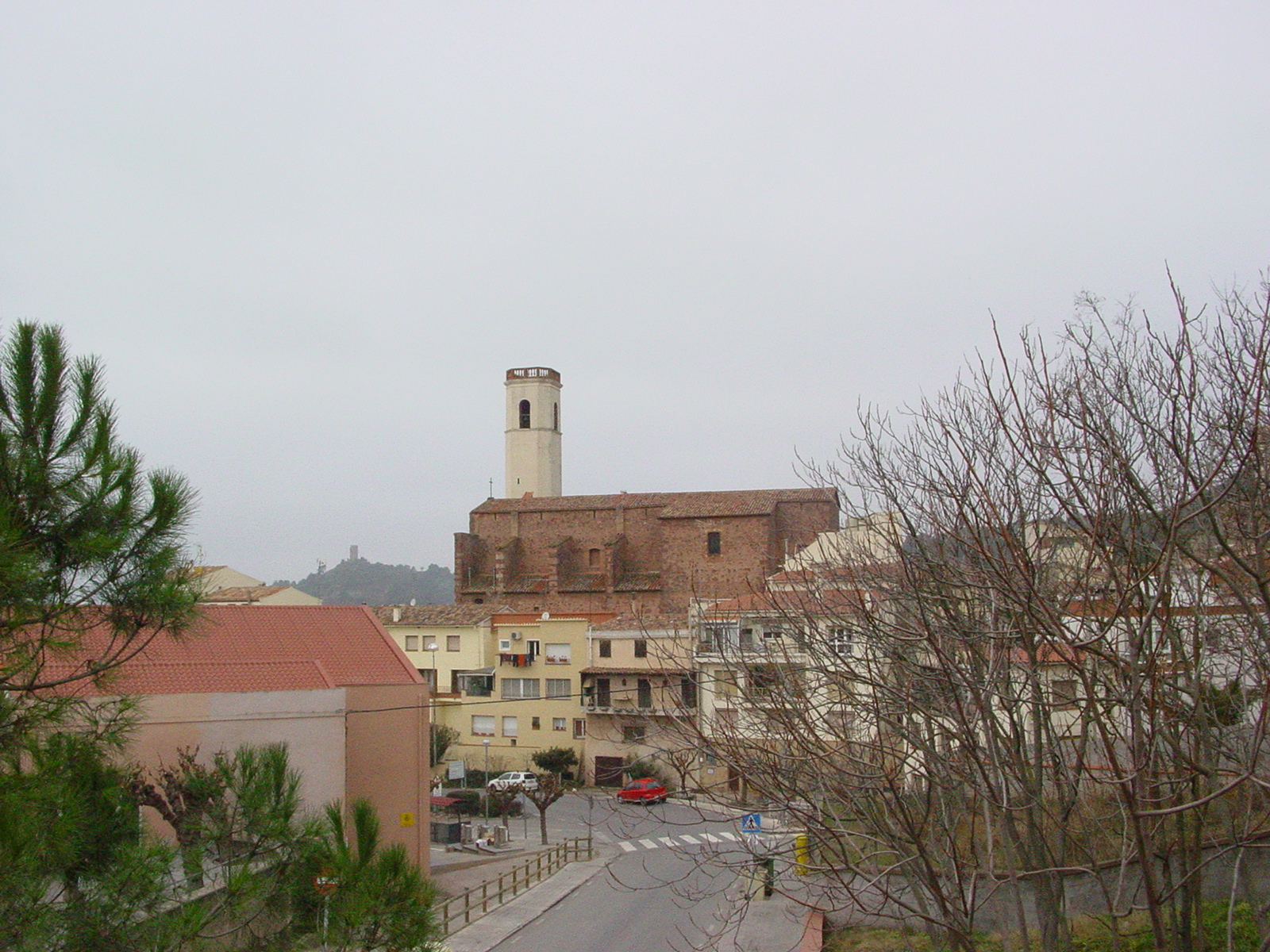
- Vacarisses

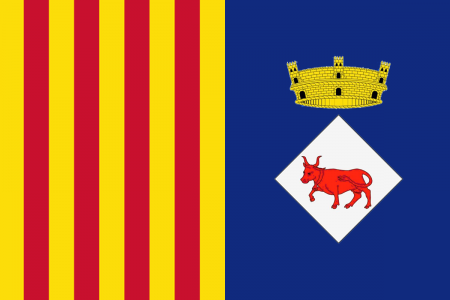
- Flag Coat of arms

- Location in Catalonia Vacarisses (Spain)
- Coordinates: 41°36′N 1°55′E
- Country: Spain
- Community: Catalonia
- Province: Barcelona
- Comarca: Vallès Occidental

Government
  - Mayor: Antoni Massana Ubach (2015)

Area
  - Total: 40.7 km^{2} (15.7 sq mi)

Population (2025-01-01)
  - Total: 7,729
  - Density: 190/km^{2} (492/sq mi)
- Website: www.vacarisses.cat

Vacarisses (Catalan pronunciation: [bəkəˈɾisəs]) is a village in the province of Barcelona and autonomous community of Catalonia, Spain. The municipality covers an area of 40.44 square kilometres (15.61 sq mi) and the population in 2014 was 6,218. The village is home to korfball team CK Vacarisses.
