= 2016–17 Korfball League & Promotion Division promotion/relegation play-off =

Promotion / Relegation play-off
- Season: 2016–17
- Champions: Cambridge Tigers (1st); Birmingham City (2nd); Bearsted (3rd)
- Matches played: 10
- Goals scored: 190 (19 per match)

The 2016–17 Korfball League & Promotion Division promotion/relegation play-off is played between the number 8 of the England Korfball league and the top two teams of the Promotion Division North & West and South & East. In North & West Bristol Thunder and Birmingham City qualified. In South & East Croydon and Cambridge Tigers qualified.

== Teams ==
A total of 5 teams will be taking part in the play-off.

Location of teams in promotion / relegation play-off

Club	Province	Location	Position in 2016-17
Bristol Thunder	Bristol	Bristol	2nd Promotion Division (North & West)
Birmingham City	West Midlands	Birmingham	1st Promotion Division (North & West)
Bearsted	Kent	Aylesford	8th England Korfball League
Cambridge Tigers	Cambridgeshire	Cambridge	1st Promotion Division (South & East)
Croydon	Greater London	Croydon	2nd Promotion Division (South & East)

== Table ==
Pos	Team	Pld	W	D	L	GF	GA	GD	Pts	Premier League or relegation
1	Cambridge Tigers	4	3	0	1	46	42	+4	6	Promotion
2	Birmingham City	4	3	0	1	42	30	+12	6	Promotion
3	Bearsted	4	2	0	2	33	38	−5	4	Promotion
4	Bristol Thunder	4	2	0	2	37	34	+3	4	Relegation
5	Croydon	4	0	0	4	32	46	−14	0	Relegation

Updated to match(es) played on unknown. Source: England Korfball

== Results ==
=== Day 1 ===
6 May 2017
9:40

Croydon	9-10	Bristol Thunder

K2

6 May 2017
10:40

Cambridge Tigers	15-10	Bearsted

K2

6 May 2017
11:40

Bristol Thunder	5-7	Birmingham City

K2

6 May 2017
12:40

Bearsted	9-7	Croydon

K2

6 May 2017
13:40

Birmingham City	10-13	Cambridge Tigers

K2

=== Day 2 ===
7 May 2017
9:30

Bearsted	11-7	Bristol Thunder

K2

7 May 2017
10:30

Croydon	7-11	Cambridge Tigers

K2

7 May 2017
11:30

Birmingham City	9-3	Bearsted

K2

7 May 2017
12:30

Bristol Thunder	15-7	Cambridge Tigers

K2

1 May 2016
13:30

Birmingham City	16-9	Croydon

K2
