= SKK Prievidza Dolphins =

Prievidza Dolphins
- Full name: SKK Prievidza Dolphins
- Founded: 1990
- Chairman: Martin Sonoga
- Manager: Marcel Kavala
- League: None
- Website: http://skkprievidza.webnode.sk/

SKK Prievidza Dolphins, is an amateur Korfball club from Prievidza, Slovakia. The club is one of the two existing Slovak korfball clubs and has around 40 members.

== Squad (Current) ==
- (Slovakia) Michaela Svitekova
- (Slovakia) Monika Zanova
- (Slovakia) Stanislava Gogova
- (Slovakia) Zuzana Busikova
- (Slovakia) Lujza Mojzisova
- (Slovakia) Kristina Homolova
- (Slovakia) Eva Busikova
- (Slovakia) Juraj Goga
- (Slovakia) Peter Busik
- (Slovakia) Peter Fabik
- (Slovakia) Tomas Kocner
- (Slovakia) Marcel Kavala
- (Slovakia) Robert Mojzis
- (Slovakia) Maros Gajdosik
- (Slovakia) Matej Mendel
- (England) Elizabeth Alexandra Mary

Player / Head coach

- (Slovakia) Marcel Kavala
