= 2016 IKF European Korfball Championship =

2016 European Korfball A-Championship
Tournament details
- Host country: Netherlands
- Dates: 22 to 30 october 2016
- Teams: 10

Final positions
- Champions: Netherlands (6th title)
- Runners-up: Belgium
- Third place: Catalonia
- Fourth place: Portugal

The 2018 European Korfball Championship was held in the Netherlands from October 22 to October 30, with 10 national teams in competition. As the European Korfball Championship was split into an A-Championship and a B-Championship as of 2018, this tournament was used to decide which teams would participate at which level, with the top 8 teams qualifying for the A-Championship, while the teams in positions 9 and 10 relegated to the B-Championship. Netherlands won the tournament for a sixth consecutive time, maintaining its 100% win record.

== Qualified teams ==
Team	Method of qualification	Finals appearance	Previous appearance	IKF Ranking (Note: The rankings are shown as of August 2016. These are the rankings used for the final draw.)
Belgium	2014 IKF European Korfball Championship runners-up	6th	2014	4
Catalonia	2016 IKF European Korfball Championship First Round West runners-up	5th	2014	8
Czech Republic	2014 IKF European Korfball Championship fifth	6th	2014	6
England	2014 IKF European Korfball Championship fourth	6th	2014	3
Germany	2016 IKF European Korfball Championship First Round East winners	6th	2014	7
Netherlands	2014 IKF European Korfball Championship winners	6th	2014	1
Poland	2016 IKF European Korfball Championship First Round East runners-up	5th	2014	14
Portugal	2014 IKF European Korfball Championship third	5th	2014	9
Russia	2014 IKF European Korfball Championship sixth	4th	2014	12
Turkey	2016 IKF European Korfball Championship First Round West winners	3rd	2014	16

1. includes participations of Great Britain until 2006.

== Group stage ==
The number of participating teams was brought down from 16 during the past two championships to only 10 in 2016, thus requiring a new format. Two groups (A and B) of five teams were drawn on 6 June 2016, with each team playing the other teams in their group once. The top two teams in these groups will move to the semi-finals. The other teams will also be paired with a team from the other group in a playoff match with the winners moving into group C playing for positions 5 through 7, while the playoff losers will go into group D playing for positions 8 through 10.

=== Group A ===
Pos	Team	Pld	W	OTW	OTL	L	GF	GA	GD	Pts	Qualification
1	Netherlands	4	4	0	0	0	123	51	+72	12	Semi-finals
2	Catalonia	4	3	0	0	1	96	64	+32	9	Semi-finals
3	Germany	4	2	0	0	2	77	71	+6	6	Play-offs
4	Russia	4	1	0	0	3	53	120	−67	3	Play-offs
5	Turkey	4	0	0	0	4	47	90	−43	0	Play-offs

Source: IKF

Team 1	Score	Team 2
Netherlands	22 − 17	Catalonia
Russia	19 − 12	Turkey
Turkey	15 − 23	Catalonia
Netherlands	26 − 15	Germany
Germany	21 − 13	Turkey
Catalonia	35 − 11	Russia
Germany	25 − 11	Russia
Netherlands	28 − 7	Turkey
Catalonia	21 − 16	Germany
Netherlands	48 − 12	Russia

=== Group B ===
Pos	Team	Pld	W	OTW	OTL	L	GF	GA	GD	Pts	Qualification
1	Belgium	4	4	0	0	0	114	52	+62	12	Semi-finals
2	Portugal	4	3	0	0	1	73	55	+18	9	Semi-finals
3	England	4	2	0	0	2	66	66	0	6	Play-offs
4	Czech Republic	4	1	0	0	3	54	77	−23	3	Play-offs
5	Poland	4	0	0	0	4	37	94	−57	0	Play-offs

Source: IKF

Team 1	Score	Team 2
Czech Republic	16 − 6	Poland
Belgium	22 − 14	England
Belgium	25 − 14	Portugal
England	23 − 13	Poland
Poland	8 − 22	Portugal
England	17 − 14	Czech Republic
Portugal	20 − 10	Czech Republic
Belgium	33 − 10	Poland
England	12 − 17	Portugal
Belgium	34 − 14	Czech Republic

== Knockout stage ==
=== Semi-finals ===
Semi-finals
Netherlands	31
Portugal	10
Belgium	26
Catalonia	13

Final
Netherlands	27
Belgium	14
Third place
Portugal	12
Catalonia	16

=== 5th–10th place play-offs ===
==== Play-off round ====
Team 1	Score	Team 2
Germany	23 − 11	Poland
Russia	9 − 25	Czech Republic
Turkey	7 − 25	England

==== Group C ====
The three teams winning in the Play-off round will play each other in Group C to determine places 5 through 7.

Pos	Team	Pld	W	OTW	OTL	L	GF	GA	GD	Pts
1	Germany	2	2	0	0	0	28	15	+13	6
2	England	2	1	0	0	1	22	17	+5	3
3	Czech Republic	2	0	0	0	2	15	33	−18	0

Source: IKF

Team 1	Score	Team 2
England	8 − 9	Germany
England	14 − 8	Czech Republic
Czech Republic	7 − 19	Germany

==== Group D ====
The three teams losing in the Play-off round will play each other in Group D to determine places 8 through 10.

Pos	Team	Pld	W	OTW	OTL	L	GF	GA	GD	Pts
1	Russia	2	2	0	0	0	31	28	+3	6
2	Poland	2	1	0	0	1	28	25	+3	3
3	Turkey	2	0	0	0	2	25	31	−6	0

Source: IKF

Team 1	Score	Team 2
Turkey	10 − 15	Poland
Turkey	15 − 16	Russia
Russia	15 − 13	Poland

== Final standing ==
Rank	Team
1st place, gold medalist(s)	Netherlands
2nd place, silver medalist(s)	Belgium
3rd place, bronze medalist(s)	Catalonia
4	Portugal
5	Germany
6	England
7	Czech Republic
8	Russia
9	Poland
10	Turkey
