= England Korfball League =

- Country: England
- Number of clubs: 10
- Level on pyramid: 1
- Relegation to: Regional Leagues
- International cup: IKF Champions League
- Current champions: Bec

The England Korfball League (EKL) (also commonly referred to as the National League) is the highest echelon of korfball in England. In its current format, the EKL comprises 10 teams, each playing every other team in a home and an away fixture (total 18 matches per year). The top four teams in the league at the end of the regular season progress to semi-finals and either the Grand Final or bronze medal match to determine the final standings. These are played as standalone matches, with the teams ranked 1st and 2nd at the end of the regular season earning the right to host their semi-final at their home venue.

The EKL typically runs from September/October - April annually, with breaks for international competitions, the National Youth Inter-Area Competition, Inter-University Championships (BUCS Korfball) and public holidays (Christmas and Easter). The English Korfball Association is the administrator of the league. The playoffs take place in May, with two weeks between the semi-final and grand finals. The promotional playoff final takes place at the same event as the grand final and bronze medal match.

== Current Competing Teams ==
In the 2025–2026 season, the following clubs are competing in the EKL.

Club	Area Association	Year Promoted to EKL
Bearsted Korfball Club	Kent	2025*
Bec Korfball Club	London	Prior to current format/records
Bristol Thunder Korfball Club	South West	2018
Bromley Korfball Club	London	2024
Cambridge Tigers Korfball Club	Cambridgeshire	2017
Kingfisher Korfball Club	Kent	
Nomads Korfball Club	London	Prior to current format/records
Norwich Knights Korfball Club	Norfolk	
Tornadoes Korfball Club & Academy	Kent	
Trojans Korfball Club	London	Prior to current format/records

* indicates a team who have previously competed in the EKL, and this date represents their most recent promotion.

Existing clubs who have previously competed in the national league in its current format include:

- Birmingham City Korfball Club
- Croydon Korfball Club
- Highbury Korfball Club
- KV Korfball Club (formed from Kwiek and Invicta Korfball Clubs)
- Manchester Warriors Korfball Club
- Mitcham Korfball Club (now known as South London Korfball Club)
- Norwich City Korfball Club
- Nottingham Korfball Club

== Champions ==
Season	Champions	Runners-up
1986-87	Mitcham	
1987-88	Mitcham	
1988-89	Mitcham	
1989-90	Vultrix	
1990-91	Mitcham	
1991-92	Nomads	
1992-93	Vultrix	
1993-94	Mitcham	
1994-95	Mitcham	
1995-96	Croydon	
1996-97	Mitcham	
1997-98	Mitcham	
1998–99	Mitcham	
1999–00	Mitcham	
2000–01	Mitcham	
2001–02	Invicta	
2002–03	Invicta	
2003–04	Mitcham	
2004–05	Invicta	
2005–06	Mitcham	
2006–07	Mitcham	Kwiek
2007–08	Trojans	Mitcham
2008–09	Trojans	Kwiek
2009–10	Trojans	Nottingham
2010–11	Trojans	Nottingham
2011–12	Trojans	Nottingham
2012–13	Trojans	Kingfisher
2013–14	Trojans	Bec Korfball Club
2014–15	Trojans	Bec Korfball Club
2015–16	Trojans	Bec Korfball Club
2016-17	Trojans	Norwich Knights
2017–18	Trojans	Bec Korfball Club
2018-19	Trojans	Bec Korfball Club
2019-20	Playoffs cancelled due to COVID-19	
2020-21	Playoffs cancelled due to COVID-19	
2021-22	Trojans	Tornadoes Korfball Club
2022–23	Bec Korfball Club	Trojans
2023-24	Bec Korfball Club	Trojans
2024-25	Bec Korfball Club	Bristol Thunder Korfball Club

== Multiple Champions ==
Team	Titles
Mitcham	14
Trojans	13
Invicta	3
Bec	3
Vultrix	2

== Promotion and Relegation ==
The team ranked 10th relegates directly. Previously the number 9 ranked team would play to remain in the top division by ending up in the top two of promotion/relegation play-off. Each year, a team is promoted to the EKL by winning the England Korfball Promotional Division Final. The teams competing in this final are determined by semi-finals the two top-placed teams in each of the two promotional leagues (North & West and South & East with Promo matches played in addition to regional league fixtures). The format of these is that 1st place from each league plays 2nd place from the other, and mirrors the EKL semi-finals, where the higher ranked team has a home semi-final.

To qualify to compete in the Promotional League, teams must place high enough (1st place, with some regions also having 2nd place qualify) in their respective regional league. Only 1st teams can qualify for the Promotional League, and therefore the EKL, and qualifying clubs must also have a total of at least three teams in order to be eligible.

== Changes to League Size ==
Previous editions of the EKL have had varying numbers of competing teams - the 2017-18 season was the most recent time the league size was altered, increasing the size from 8 to 10 teams.

== EKL and Promotional Final Format and Venues ==
Prior to the COVID-19 Pandemic, the promotional and EKA playoffs took place on consecutive weekend days (semi-finals on Saturday, and finals on Sunday). Prior to 2018, the promotional playoffs took a round-robin format.

Prior to 2017, the EKL playoffs were hosted at Whitgift School, London, for several years. In 2017, the EKA hosted the finals at the K2 Arena, Crawley. The 2018 and 2019 playoff finals were hosted at the Copper Box Arena in London. The 2020 edition was also due to take place at the Copper Box, but was cancelled due to the COVID-19 pandemic. Following the pandemic, the 2022-2024 finals were hosted at the University of East Anglia SportsPark. The 2025 finals returned to the K2 arena, and this venue is also booked for 2026.

Year	Venue
2017	K2
2018	Copper Box Arena
2019	Copper Box Arena
2020 and 2021	Cancelled due to Pandemic
2022	UEA SportsPark
2023	UEA SportsPark
2024	UEA SportsPark
2025	K2
2026	K2

== Progression to European Competition ==
Historically, the winner of the ELK grand final would progress to the Europa Cup Competition the following season, and the runner up would progress to the Europa Shield Competition. Since the 2022–2023 season, the Korfball Champions League has replaced these competitions, with the teams finishing the EKL playoffs in places 1-3 usually qualifying for the different tiers of champions league competition.
