= Bonson (surname) =

Bonson is a surname. Notable people with the surname include:

- Joe Bonson (1934–1991), English footballer
- Matthew Bonson, Australian politician

== See also ==
- Benson (surname)
- Bronson (name)
