= Boeckenberg KC =

Korfball club in Deurne, Belgium

Boeckenberg
- Full name: Boeckenberg Korfbal Club
- Founded: 1932
- Chairman: Frank De Schryver
- Manager: Johannis Schot
- League: Topkorfbal League
- Website: http://www.boeckenberg.be
Home colours

Boeckenberg Korfbal Club is an amateur korfball club from Deurne, Belgium. The club has been dominating Belgian korfball since the 2006-07 season, only losing the title once as of 2011, to Scaldis in the 2009-10 season. In the seventies the club also won two titles.

== Squad (current) ==
- Player / Head coach: (Netherlands) Hans Leeuwenhoek
- (Belgium) Veronique Biot
- (Belgium) Lenke De Bremaeker
- (Belgium) Evy De Hert
- (Belgium) Sara Goossens
- (Belgium) Sofie Goossens
- (Belgium) Sanne Peelmans
- (Belgium) Nikki Schilders
- (Belgium) Karen Van Camp
- (Belgium) Elke Wauters
- (Belgium) Jeffrey Campers
- (Belgium) Jesse De Bremaeker
- (Belgium) Matthias De Meulder
- (Belgium) Jarrett De Vriendt
- (Belgium) Davor Duronjic
- (Belgium) Glenn Goffa
- (Belgium) Christoph Hellemans
- (Belgium) Nick Janssens
- (Belgium) Joran Struyf
- (Belgium) Yannik Struyf

== Honours ==
- 1973-74, 1975-76, 2006-07, 2007-08, 2008-09, 2010-11 - Belgian Champion (6 times)

== Europa Cup ==
As national champion, the club has participated 9 times in the IKF Europa Cup. On each participation, Boeckenberg won the silver medal in this competition for European club champions.

== Season by season ==
		INDOOR					OUTDOOR				
Season	Tier	League	Pos.	W–L–D	European competitions		Tier	League	Pos.	W–L–D	Belgian Cup
2018-2019	1	Topkorfballeague	6th	5-6-3	Europa Cup	Runner-up	1	Topkorfballeague	5th	7-7-0	Quarterfinalist
