= FJEP Bonson =

Bonson
- Full name: FJEP Bonson
- Founded: 1968
- Chairman: Unknown
- Manager: Unknown
- League: Championnat Fédéral
- Website: http://korfbal.bonson.free.fr

FJEP Bonson, is an amateur Korfball club from Bonson, France. The club has dominated French korfball since the 2004/05 season. In the nineties they also won several national titles.

== Squad (Current) ==
- (France) Adeline Garde
- (France) Aude Marhin
- (France) Lauriane Lopez
- (France) Marlene Damin
- (France) Laetitia Bonnet-Rabier
- (France) Celine Caltagirone
- (France) Cyrille Rival
- (France) Denis Dancert
- (France) Ludovic Bancel
- (France) Remi Miguel
- (France) David Dupuy
- (France) Damien Graczyk
- (France) Grégory Pernik
- (France) Guillaume Damin

Player / Head coach

Unknown

== Honours ==
- 1993/94, 1995/96, 1996/97, 1997/98, 1998/99, 1999/00, 2004/05, 2005/06, 2006/07, 2007/08, 2008/09, 2009/10, 2010/11 - French Champion (13 times)
