= Club Korfball Vallparadís =

Catalan korfball team

Club Korfbal Vallparadís
- Founded: 2005
- League: Catalan korfball league
- Based in: Terrassa
- Arena: Municipal de Sant Llorenç
- Colors
- President: Joaquín Blázquez
- Head coach: Miguel A. Tobaruela

Club Korfbal Vallparadís is a Catalan korfball team located in Terrassa, playing home matches in the Pavelló Municipal de Sant Llorenç. The club was founded in 2005.

They are the first Catalan club winner of a European competition, the Europa Shield in 2009. In 2011 they won for the second time the Europa Shield, in Warsaw, and in 2013 for the third time, in Třeboň.

In the 2010/11 season the club was champion of Catalonia for the first time. In 2007 they were the Catalan Cup winners.

== 2011/12 squad ==
- (Spain) Cristina Visconti Martinez
- (Spain) Jessica Lechuga Godinez
- (Spain) Míriam González Flores
- (Spain) Laia Rosa Lorente
- (Spain) Berta Alomà Sesé
- (Spain) Javier Blazquez Buisan
- (Spain) Jose Luis Jurado Cruz
- (Spain) Alexis Escardibul Tejeira
- (Spain) Ramon Ortigosa Sanchiz
- (Spain) Cesar Manuel De Souza Niglia
- (Spain) Miguel Guerrero Minaya
- Head coach: Miguel Ángel Tobaruela

== Honours ==
- 2006 - 2007: Catalonia's Cup winners
- 2008 - 2009: Europa Shield winners.
- 2010 - 2011: Europa Shield winners - Catalonia's League champions.
- 2012 - 2013: Europa Shield winners.
