= Club Korfbal Vacarisses =

Catalan korfball team

Club Korfbal Vacarisses is a Catalan korfball team located in Vacarisses (Catalonia). The team was founded on 2003 and they play in white shirts and red shorts/skirts. They are the current Catalan national champions.

== Honours ==
2004 - 2005 - Catalonia national champions - Catalonia cup champions
2005 - 2006 - Catalonia national champions - Catalonia cup champions
2006 - 2007 - Catalonia national champions
2007 - 2008 - Catalonia national champions - Catalonia cup champions
2008 - 2009 - Catalonia national champions - Catalonia cup champions
2009 - 2010 - Catalonia national champions

== Team ==
- 1 Rosendo García Bernedo
- 2 Jordi Díaz Gómez
- 3 Montse Cortés Luceño
- 4 Raquel Varela Alonso
- 5 Marta Flores Cuadrat
- 6 Lidia Soriano Ruiz
- 7 Oscar Hernandez Salvador
- 8 Albert Camprubí Rovira
- Head coach Antonio Vargas Guijarro
