= KV Adler Rauxel =

KV Adler Rauxel e.V.
- Full name: Korfball Verein Adler Rauxel e.V.
- Founded: 1968
- Chairman: Heinz-Günter Böhmer
- Manager: Bastian Held
- League: Regionalliga Nord-West
- Website: http://www.adler-rauxel.de

KV Adler Rauxel, is an amateur Korfball club from Castrop-Rauxel, Germany. The club is historically one of two clubs dominating German Korfball together with KC Grün-Weiß.

== Squad (Current) ==
- (Germany) Hornig, Annika
- (Germany) Holtkotte, Katharina
- (Germany) Strach, Julia
- (Germany) Sander, Lea
- (Germany) Treffts, Johanna
- (Germany) Gust, Madeleine
- (Germany) Bressan, Christoph
- (Germany) Fernow, Patrick
- (Germany) Grammel, Maurice
- (Germany) Langer, Johannes
- (Germany) Treffts, Jonathan

Head coach

- (Germany) Fernow, Patrick

== Honours ==
- German Champion (24 times): 1975, 1976, 1977, 1978, 1981, 1982, 1983, 1984, 1985, 1986, 1987, 1988, 1989, 1990, 1991, 1999, 2002, 2003, 2005, 2007, 2008, 2009, 2010, 2011, 2016; 2020, 2026;
- DTB Cup Winners (5 times): 2006, 2007, 2009, 2010, 2011, 2014, 2018
- IKF Korfball Shield (1 time): 2018
