= Bec Korfball Club =

- Full name: Bec Korfball Club
- Founded: 1948
- Chairman: Lisa Swain
- Manager: John Denton
- League: England Korfball League
- Website: http://www.beckorfball.co.uk

Bec Korfball Club is based in South London, England and is a member of the England Korfball Association.

Established in 1948 in Tooting, Bec is the second oldest korfball club in the UK. It currently has four teams that play in various leagues across London and the UK. The Bec Korfball Club first team won the Korfball Europa Shield in 2015 and came second in the same tournament in 2016. Bec won the England Korfball League for the first time in 2023. The club were Runners up in (2013–14, 2014–15 & 2015–2016).

== Current squad ==
- (England) Joe Bedford (C)
- (England) Davesh Patel
- (England) Blake Palfreyman
- (England) Marcus Tighe
- (England) Jack Protheroe
- (England) Kieran Tang
- (England) Stuart Ironmonger
- (England) Billy Ashby
- (England) Shannon Jones
- (England) Kenzie Baldock
- (England) Rachel Turner
- (England) Ashley Warner
- (England) Chloe Swain
- (England) Ellie Eysselinck
- (England) Thea

- Head Coach (England) John Denton
- Assistant Coach (England) Tom Woolmer

== IKF Europa Shield ==
The Europa Shield is the second tier annual korfball club competition by the International Korfball Federation. Bec has won this competition 4 times.

Bec @ Europa Shield
Year	Host	Result
2015	Bergisch Gladbach (GER)	Champion
2016	Castrop-Rauxel (GER)	2nd place
2017	Odivelas (POR)	Champion
2018	Odivelas (POR)	2nd place
2019	Prostějov (CZE)	Champion
2020	Bergisch Gladbach (GER)	Champion
