= Trojans Korfball Club =

Sports club in Croydon, England

Trojans
- Full name: Trojans Korfball Club
- Founded: 1972
- Chairman: Stella Hegarty
- Coach: Sarah-Jane Spice
- League: England Korfball League
- Website: http://www.trojanskorfballclub.co.uk

Trojans is a korfball club based in Croydon, England. The club was established in 1972 and is part of the England Korfball Association. They are 11 time National League Champions (2007–08, 2008–09, 2009–10, 2010–11, 2011–12, 2012–13, 2013–14, 2014–15, 2015–16, 2016–17, 2017–18, 2018–19 and 2021-22), 4 time EKA Cup Champions (2006–07, 2007–08, 2008–09 & 2009–10) and have also won the Europa Shield in 2007 in Vilanova i la Geltrú and a bronze medal at the Europa Cup 2012 in Warsaw, bronze medal at the Europa Cup 2017 in Sassenheim and bronze medal at the Europa Cup in 2019 in Kortrijk.

== League history ==
=== 1999–2002 ===
From early 2000, Trojans has been close to the bottom of the National League, often finishing 2nd bottom. This resulted in them playing a playoff match with the runners up of the then Reserve (2nd) Division for the rights to play top flight Korfball the following year. The male members of the team needed the guidance of the older, experienced players to increase their skill level. At this time, the average age of the 1st team males was just 17 compared to the females at 34.

For 3 consecutive seasons (1999–2000, 2000–01 and 2001–02) Trojans managed to win the playoff match and maintain their National League status.

They would go against other larger teams such as Mitcham, Invicta, Croydon & The Nomads but they could not win the matches.

=== 2002–03 ===
In the season of 2002–03, two of the starting four females retired. This opportunity gave rise to some younger players being offered 1st team opportunities and, with the signing of other young female players and a new coach, paved way for Trojans finish in the National League (4th). With 3rd placed Nomads not being able to commit to the Europa Shield 2003 in Třeboň, Czech Republic, it gave the club and the young Trojan team a chance to sample European Club competition (the 1st time in the club's history).

=== 2003–04 ===
The young Trojan team scored 14–11 which was a loss to League Champions Mitcham. They also had difficulty against teams like Croydon and finished the season in 4th place. They missed out on a top-three finish and a spot in the European competition. Later, the male players showed significant improvement in their performance. With new younger female players joining the squad, the teams verall lineup became more balanced.

The team missed the top three for the first time in the club's history. However, they stated their goal is to finish in a higher position next season.

=== 2004–05 ===
The season demonstrated greater cohesion than the previous year, with the team adopting a more structured and effective style of korfball that built on their strengths. Although they were not yet able to match the country’s leading teams, Mitcham and Invicta, they remained competitive in their encounters, as demonstrated in the opening match of the season, where Trojans narrowly lost to Invicta by 11–10.

Despite not being able to defeat these 2 teams, they were finally able to defeat their local rivals Croydon for the first time in both league meetings (8–21 and 15–12) as well as in the EKA Cup (16–11). Chris Spice top scored in the first match with 10 goals against Ross Carr-Taylor (9 from open play).

After reaching the semi-final stage of the EKA Cup, Trojans went on to beat the remaining teams in the league and finish 3rd overall, booking a place in the Europa Shield 2005, which was to be held in their hometown of Croydon, England.

Invicta won the National League that season and so the other English team that joined Trojans in the Shield were their other local rivals, Mitcham.

Whilst Trojans were confident that they could do better than their previous appearance in this competition, they had to face Mitcham in their 1st match of the tournament. Again, like in Třeboň, they were overwhelmed by the occasion and ended up losing 12–6. This paved the way for the rest of their matches and once again they ended up finishing the tournament bottom and still without a win in Europe. To make matters worse, Mitcham won the overall competition and in doing so became the first English team to win the Europa Shield.

=== 2005–06 ===
This was the first season that Trojans believed they had a genuine chance at winning the league title.

Their first match of the season was to be against the current National League Champions Invicta, who hosted a team full of international players (including Trojans' coach). Despite holding their own early on, a couple of costly errors allowed the game to get away from them and they ended up losing out 11–9.

The competitiveness of the Trojans in relation to the League Champions and the performance in general created momentum going forward for the season.

They went on to record double wins against the likes of Croydon, Nomads, Bec, Kwiek & Nottingham and even managed a 9–9 draw against Mitcham in an exhilarating finale (2 goals were scored in the final 30 seconds, first Mitcham and then Trojans with the leveller right at the whistle). This was the first time Trojans had ever managed more than a loss against their London rivals.

Just when they thought that performance couldn't be bettered, they managed to defy the odds and defeat Invicta 11–10 in their 2nd to last league match and in doing so gave the title to Mitcham.

Trojans ended the season in 3rd place again, only 1 point behind Invicta in 2nd and 5 behind the winners Mitcham. There was disappointment that they didn't improve on their overall league position from the previous season but the improvements were there in the performances against the top 2 teams.

Once again, Trojans qualified for the Europa Shield 2006, this year being played in Selm, Germany.

Determined to finally get their European credentials underway despite 2 previous lacklustre outings, Trojans travelled to Germany, riding off the confidence gained from their ability to mix it with the best in England.

In their opening match against the Hungarian side MAFC, they were able to play to their strengths and overcome their opponents 9–5. The next game put them up against one of the tournament favourites and previous Europa Shield winners, Czech side TJ Znojmo. In a hotly fought contest, neither team could press home their advantage and with Trojans 1 goal down, they were awarded a penalty. David Brooks stepped up to coolly convert it and tie the match at 11–11.

With a draw against the Czech side, it meant that Trojans realistically only needed to avoid defeat against the home side KV Selmer (Znojmo had previously beaten Selmer 13–10) to progress to the 3rd/4th playoff spot. They also had an outside chance of making the 1st/2nd playoff if they beat KV Selmer by 8 goals or more. The match started off pretty even with both teams trading goals however it was the home side that took a one-goal lead at half time, 6–5.

The second half carried on in pretty much the same vein until KV Selmer managed to pull into a 4-goal lead at 11–7. Trojans hung on in there and with some smart, clever passing pulled back 2 quick goals to bring the score to 11–9. With the momentum seemingly back with them, Trojans pushed for another goal and got it with a smart long shot. With less than a minute remaining, the home side looked to play "keep ball" and in doing so caused Trojans to concede a penalty and effectively the match. The final score ended 12–10 to KV Selmer who advanced through to the 3rd/4th playoffs.

Trojans were disappointed after coming close, but the performances they had produced against the other team were pleasing. Not once were they outclassed (this was evident by their 11–11 draw with TJ Znojmo who ran out eventual winners of the competition).

Trojans finished off their European campaign with victories over English rivals Invicta (10–5) and for the second time of asking Hungarian side MAFC (9–8) to claim 5th spot.

=== 2006–07 ===
With the team gaining experience in close fought competition (both in the league and Europe), their confidence was ever growing. They maintained that belief in their opening league fixtures which included a 1st time win over reigning National League Champions Mitcham (16–12).

They were top of the league 6 games into the 14 game season and let their guard down against the less fancied but renewed Kwiek. They were missing club captain Chris Spice through injury and added to that, the coherence in the team wasn't there. This was the first game back after the Christmas period (the last of which was the victory over Mitcham) and it showed. From the beginning of the match Trojans were second best. Kwiek were playing at the peak of their game and they managed to pull off a shock victory of 8–11. Trojans were devastated at letting slip the advantage they had over rivals Mitcham. The hard work that was done beating the reigning champions had been undone and Trojans had slipped down to 2nd place on goal difference. The home match against Mitcham towards the end of the season was now a must win game (as was the other remaining 6 matches).

They managed to win against the Nomads, Croydon, Bec, Kingfishers & Nottingham. Trojans had lost player David Brooks through a broken metatarsal whilst training with the GB senior team.

And so it came to their home match against Mitcham, it was clear that this was going to be a hotly contested battle. Mitcham started the stronger and raced into a 0–4 lead. Trojans managed to peg back a couple of goals but they were always playing catch up. With the score 3–7 at half time, coach Gary Brooks tried installing some belief in his young players, sensing an uphill struggle in the 2nd half.

They came out and tried their best to get back into the match but it wasn't enough and the experience of the Mitcham team eventually won through 8–13.

With the League title effectively all but lost, Trojans had to re-group if they were to take 2nd spot. Their previous conquerors Kwiek were level on points and so the remaining match between the two sides would decide the runners up spot, the loser taking 3rd place.

Trojans had some more injuries to contend with, their captain Chris Spice was again sidelined and David Brooks had still not recovered from his metatarsal problem.

With a beleaguered squad, Trojans battled for the full 60 minutes but were eventually beaten by several goals and with it, secured 3rd place for the 3rd consecutive season.

Trojans had a chance at revenge in the EKA Cup final where they faced off against the new National Champions Mitcham. The match was tight throughout the 60 minutes and neither side could be separated, forcing the game into a Golden Goal situation. Both teams had opportunities to score and both failed to capitalise until ex-player Sinead Cafferkey found herself unmarked from 3 metres out and slotted the ball home to seal the victory for Trojans.

It was their first piece of senior silverware in English Korfball.

The 2007 Europa Shield in Barcelona, Spain was to be Trojans 4th time in the competition. They had just signed 2 new female players over the close season which had helped to bolster their squad.

Their 1st match was against English rivals Kwiek who had beaten them to 2nd place in the domestic league. Trojans led from the beginning and never looked back winning 12–6. Next up they faced a familiar opponent in MAFC. With the Hungarians playing their strong style of rebound defence, it took a while before Trojans could find their shooting boots and eventually pull away 10–5 winners. Their final match of day 1 was against KV Selmer, the team that beat them by 2 goals the previous year. Much to the satisfaction of the coach, Trojans came firing out of the blocks and put on their best performance in a while to win convincingly 14–7.

The 2nd day saw Trojans face the 2 home teams of CEVG and CK Vallparadís. In the 1st match it was a tense affair. Both teams traded goals equally and with literally the last shot of the match, David Brooks levelled the score at 10–10 and took the game to a Golden Goal situation. After 5 minutes of no one scoring, the dreaded penalty shoot out was introduced. CEVG converted their 1st 2 penalties and Trojans obliged by scoring their 1st one but veteran Rob Williams failed to put away his effort, handing victory to the Catalans and with it, Trojans 1st defeat of the tournament (he later puts the penalty miss down to his shirt being too tight).

The loss meant that Trojans had to beat CK Vallparadís in their final match if they were to win the tournament (CK Vallparadís had previously won all their matches).

The game was very tight and understandably tense as both teams knew that the victor would be crowned the Europa Shield Champions. The players were nervous and the scoring was low throughout the match with half time coming at 3–3. The second half was very much the same, both teams working hard in defence and not allowing the attack to create many scoring opportunities. With 2 minutes remaining, Trojans worked a nice attack which saw the ball fly through their opponents basket and put them into a tantalising lead of 5–6. For the remaining 90 seconds, the Spanish team pressed and looked for the equaliser, twice coming close with efforts. Trojans managed to steal the ball and play out the final moments for a resounding and hard-fought victory.

They had become only the 2nd English team to have ever won the Europa Shield and the 1st to do it on foreign soil. It seemed that all of the hard work put in by the players and coaching team was finally paying off.

=== 2007–08 ===
And so Trojans began their 2007–08 league campaign with renewed confidence, looking to add to their already growing collection of silverware. They picked up wins against Bec, Invicta, Croydon, Nottingham, Kwiek and Nomads before heading into the first of two big games against reigning champions Mitcham. The match was close throughout with both teams playing to their respective strengths but it was Trojans who went into half time with a slender lead of 8–7. The second half continued in the same vein with Mitcham working the block enabling their shooters to have numerous chances, however the accuracy of their shots was not as deadly. Trojans on the other hand was shooting well and extended their lead, adding further pressure on their opponents. With Mitchams chances fading with the clock, Trojans played with experience and were able to see out the match 15–13 to give the club 'first blood' in the head to heads.

Both teams continued to win their other matches against the other teams in the National League, ensuring that the title would be decided in the final game of the season when the two teams faced off again. In what was a slow and low-scoring affair, Trojans came from 3 goals down at half time to take the match 11–10 and with it their first ever National League title. With 2 pieces of silverware already won that season, Trojans went for the treble when they reached the semi-finals of the EKA Cup. This would prove to be a tough ask though as they were drawn against Mitcham 2, the winner of which would face Mitcham 1 in the final. The Trojans team fought hard and played some very exciting Korfball, defeating Mitcham 2 by 4 goals. For the third time that season, Trojans played off against Mitcham in an all-important tie. With the final being played on the same day as the 2 semi finals, both teams were fatigued from their earlier escapades. Once again the match was very close and neither team managed to assert their dominance on proceedings until the latter stages of the match where Trojans pulled away with a 2-goal lead. With Mitcham chasing the game, Trojans were able to capitalise on the situation and hold out for the win. They had done it, Trojans had completed the treble and with it, their most successful season in the club's history. Trojans were at the top of the English Korfball world.

=== 2008–09 ===
Now that Trojans were the reigning National League and EKA Cup Champions, they were the team to beat and with this came the stigma of expectancy. This season the league format had changed whereby the top 4 teams would compete in "The Playoffs". The team that finished 1st would play the team that finished 4th and 2nd would play 3rd in one off matches. The winners of these games would face each other in the final and whoever won this would be crowned National League Champions.

Trojans progressed through the season well, finishing 2nd behind rivals Mitcham and in doing so, qualifying for the Playoffs. In their semi final, they swept aside Nottingham 20–14 and progressed to the final to face Kwiek, who had surprisingly overcome Mitcham in the other semi final.

With the team full of confidence, they put in an inspired performance to win with a convincing scoreline of 25–17 and thereby retained their National League title for a 2nd year.

Trojans quickly followed this success up with another EKA Cup title, this time defeating Mitcham 16–15 in the final.

=== 2009–10 ===
Trojans EKL were winners for its 3rd consecutive season.

=== 2010–11 ===
Trojans EKL were w]inners for 4th consecutive season.

=== 2011–12 ===
Trojans EKL were winners for 5th consecutive season.

=== 2012–13 ===
Trojans EKL were winners for 6th consecutive season.

=== 2013–14 ===
Trojans EKL were winner for 7th consecutive season.

Trojans qualified as top favorites for the English Korfball League Play Offs having won all of their league matches during the regular season. In the semi-final Trojans beat Norwich Nights to secure their place in the final where they met Bec. Bec took an early 0–5 lead in the game which was probably the best EKL Final ever and just after half time Trojans were trailing by 7 goals. Trojans made some subs just before half time which gave them a bit more control over the game and they never really looked out of the game after this point. They managed to get back in the game and even took the lead. At the final whistle the scores were 17–17 and extra time was needed to separate the two teams. In extra time Tony Woodvine narrowly missed a running in shot from the side within seconds of the restart and managed to collect his shot and pass it to Dave Brooks who scored from a long shot. Bec now had one attack to try and level the scores, however with hesitant play Kat Goodridge intercepted the ball and Trojans had to play the ball out into their attacking half under great pressure from the Bec players, eventually Sam Brooks made the final pass to Dave and this was the end of the game with another victory for Trojans.

== Squad (current) ==
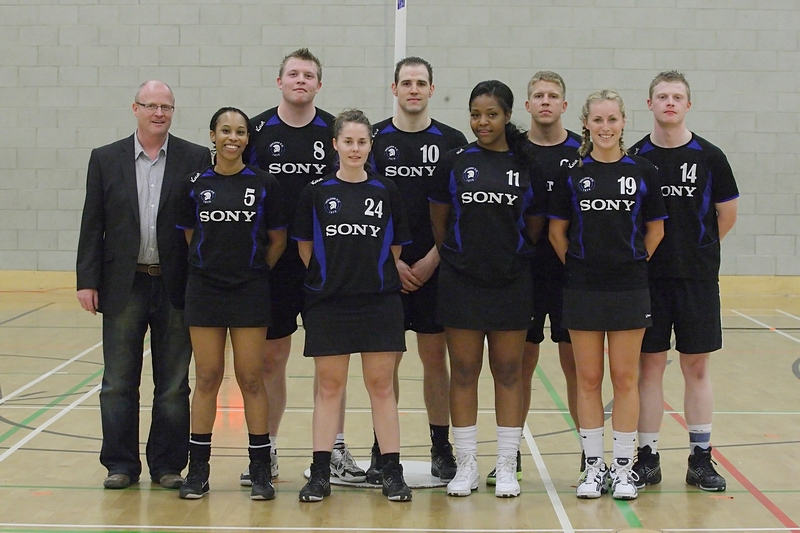
The starting 8 players for Trojans in the 2010–11 Playoff Final

- (England) Sam Brooks
- (England) Dominic Brooks
- (England) Luca Buttinger
- (Dominican Republic) Luis Vargas
- (England) Ben Dillon

- (England) Kathryn Brooks
- (England) Neala Brennan
- (England) Heather Afalobi
- (England) Niamh Butterworth
- (England) Amy Brand

- Head Coach (England) Sarah Spice

== Honours ==
- 2007–08, 2008–09, 2009–10, 2010–11, 2011–12, 2012–13, 2013–14, 2014–15, 2015–16, 2016–17, 2017–18, 2018–19 2021–22 - EKA National League Champions (13 times)
- 2006/07, 2007/08, 2008/09 & 2009/10 – EKA Cup Champions (4 times)
- 2007 – Europa Shield Champions (1 time)
- 2012, 2017, 2019 – Europa Cup Bronze Medal (3 times)
- 2003/04, 2004/05, 2005/06 – EKA u23 Champions (3 times)
