= 2027 IKF World Korfball Championship =

Korfball world tournament

- Better Together

Tournament details
- Country: Netherlands
- Venues: 12 (in 12 host cities)
- Dates: 15–24 October 2027
- Teams: 24 (from 4 confederations)

Official website
- Netherlands 2027

The 2027 IKF World Korfball Championship will be the 13th edition of the IKF World Korfball Championship, the quadrennial international korfball championship organised under the aegis of International Korfball Federation for the national teams across the world. It will be held in Netherlands from 15 to 24 October 2027. This will be Netherlands' fourth time hosting. The final will be in Rotterdam.

For the second time, 24 teams took part, following the expansion in 2023. Continental championships acted as qualification. The hosts Netherlands automatically qualified.

Netherlands are the eight-time defending champions, recently beating Chinese Taipei 27–9 at the 2023 final in Taipei.

== Bidding process ==
On 11 August 2019, at a meeting in Durban, Netherlands was given the 2027 hosting rights. This came after initially applying and later losing to Chinese Taipei in the 2023 bidding process. This will be Netherlands' fourth time hosting after 1978, 1987 and 2003.

The bid envisioned a first-ever athlete village to be created with temporary housing in the Rotterdam Ahoy’s Sports and Convention complex that would be converted to a World Korfball Village.

== Preparations ==
- In September 2025, the Dutch Korfball federation announced a collaboration with TIG Sports.
- On 18 April 2026, on the day of the Dutch cup final, the host cities and logos were unveiled for the championship.

== Qualification ==
For the second time, 24 teams took part, following the expansion in 2023. Continental championships acted as qualification.

Team	Method of qualification	Date of qualification	Appearance(s)				Previous best performance (Note: Bold text indicates they hosted that edition.)	WR (Note: World rankings at the start of the tournament.)
Team	Method of qualification	Date of qualification	Total	First	Last	Streak	Previous best performance	WR
Netherlands	Hosts	11 August 2019	13th	1978	2023	13	Champions (Eleven times) (Note: Netherlands have won in 1978, 1984, 1987, 1995, 1999, 2003, 2007, 2011, 2015, 2019 and 2023.)	1
Zimbabwe	2026 IKF Africa Cup South Winner	20 September 2026	1st	-	-	1	Debut	33
Morocco	2026 IKF Africa Cup North Winner	2 October 2026	1st	-	-	1	Debut	34
Suriname	2026 IKF Pan-American Korfball Championship Winner	8 October 2026	3rd	2019	2023	3	5th place (2023)	15
Brazil	2026 IKF Pan-American Korfball Championship 2nd place	8 October 2026	3rd	2015	2023	2	16th place (2015)	26
Belgium	2026 IKF European Korfball Championship top 10	17 October 2026	13th	1978	2023	13	Champions (1991)	2
Czech Republic	2026 IKF European Korfball Championship top 10	17 October 2026	8th	1995	2023	7	3rd place (2003, 2007)	8
Germany	2026 IKF European Korfball Championship top 10	17 October 2026	13th	1978	2023	13	3rd place (1978, 1984)	4
Portugal	2026 IKF European Korfball Championship top 10	18 October 2026	11th	1987	2023	11	3rd place (1995)	6
Catalonia	2026 IKF European Korfball Championship top 10	18 October 2026	11th	1978	2023	8	4th place (2011)	5
England	2026 IKF European Korfball Championship top 10	18 October 2026	13th	1978	2023	13	3rd place (1987, 1999)	9
Turkey	2026 IKF European Korfball Championship top 10	18 October 2026	2nd	2023		2	13th place (2023)	10
Poland	2026 IKF European Korfball Championship top 10	22 October 2026	8th	1999	2023	8	9th place (1999)	20
Hungary	2026 IKF European Korfball Championship top 10	22 October 2026	6th	2003	2023	4	9th place (2023)	19
Slovakia	Gloval reserve list: highest-ranked non-qualified European team	23 October 2026	5th	1995	2023	3	10th place (1995)	21
	2026 IKF Asia-Oceania Korfball Championship top 7	5-12 December 2026						

== Venues ==
On 18 April 2026, the host cities were announced. The host cities are Almelo, Emmen, Drachten, Duiven, Ede, Gorredijk, Hoogeveen, Oss, Ridderkerk, Rotterdam, ’s-Hertogenbosch, and Zaanstad. The semifinals and final will take place at the Ahoy Arena in Rotterdam. Leiden had stated interest in hosting the tournament at Sportcomplex 1574, but failed to make the cut.
