= 2023 IKF World Korfball Championship =

Sporting event in Taipei

Tournament details
- Host country: Taiwan
- Dates: 20–29 October 2023
- Teams: 24
- Venue(s): Taipei Gymnasium

Final positions
- Champions: Netherlands (11th title)
- Runners-up: Chinese Taipei
- Third place: Belgium
- Fourth place: Czech Republic

Tournament statistics
- Matches played: 82
- Goals scored: 2,780 (33.9 per match)
- Top scorer(s): (Netherlands) Fleur Hoek (33 goals)

The 12th IKF World Korfball Championship was held in Taipei, Taiwan. It was the first time in the history of the IKF World Korfball Championship, the final wasn't played between Belgium and the Netherlands. The International Korfball Federation awarded the hosting rights for the tournament to Taiwan on 9 August 2019, ahead of the bids of Czech Republic and the Netherlands. The Netherlands was awarded the hosting rights for the 2027 IKF World Korfball Championship instead.

In November 2022, the number of teams participating was increased from 20 to 24. The Americas are now allotted 2 spots, Africa 2 spots, Europe 12 spots, and Asia and Oceania 7 spots (in addition to the host country), among which at least one Oceanian country. (with a minimum of 1 for Oceania). Malaysia, Philippines, Thailand and Turkey are making their debut in the tournament.

The tournament also serves as the only qualification event for the 2025 World Games, with eight qualification places available. The IKF framework aims at having 4 continents representing Korfball at the TWG 2025 out of the five continents represented in the 2023 IKF World Korfball Championship – Africa, Americas, Asia, Europe, Oceania. To make this happen, participants from 4 continents should finish in the top-11 at the 2023 IKF World Korfball Championship. To determine the teams qualifying, IKF set out a series of rules:

1. All qualified teams for the 2025 World Games must participate in the 2023 IKF World Korfball Championship
2. As host of the 2025 World Games, China must be ranked in top 13 at the 2023 IKF World Korfball Championship to guarantee the qualification as host of the 2025 World Games. If China does not finish in top 13 of the 2023 IKF World Korfball Championship, a wildcard will be given to be decided by IKF Council vote, taking the interest of quality of the competition, global representation, and marketing impact into account.
3. If the top 8 ranking, including China, consists of participants of at least 4 continents the top 8 will qualify directly.
4. If four continents are represented in the Top 11 then:
  1. China qualifies (if in top 13) but does not count on behalf of Asia
  2. If China does not finish in top 13 of the 2023 IKF World Korfball Championship, a wildcard will be given to be decided by IKF Council vote
  3. Considering only Top 11 teams, the highest ranked team from each continent qualify
  4. Starting with the highest ranked team and descending, teams who have not qualified via the steps above are then added until eight places are filled
5. If three or two continents are represented in the Top 11 then:
  1. China qualifies (if in top 13) but does not count on behalf of Asia
  2. If China does not finish in top 13 of the 2023 IKF World Korfball Championship, a wildcard will be given to be decided by IKF Council vote
  3. Considering only Top 11 teams, the highest ranked team from each of those continents qualifies
  4. Starting with the highest ranked team and descending, teams who have not qualified via the steps above are then added until eight places are filled
6. If only one continent is represented in the Top 11 then:
  1. China qualifies (if in top 13) but does not count on behalf of Asia
  2. If China does not finish in top 13 of the 2023 IKF World Korfball Championship, a wildcard will be given to be decided by IKF Council vote
  3. Starting with the highest ranked team and descending, teams who have not qualified via the step above are then added until eight places are filled

== Teams ==
=== Qualification ===
Originally, the 2023 IKF World Korfball Championship was intended to involve 20 teams, but on 27 November 2022 the IKF decided to expand the tournament to 24 teams. As the European qualifiers had already been completed at that time and the IKF had awarded three extra places to European teams, third-place finishers Hungary and Slovakia qualified instantly, while the IKF decided that the fourth-place finisher ranked which was ranked highest on the IKF rankings per 1 January 2023 would qualify as well. Ireland as such qualified as well, with Switzerland becoming first reserve.

The draw for the tournament was made on 10 July 2023, at which point it became clear that both Morocco and Zimbabwe had withdrawn from the tournament and the IKF had instead invited reserves Malaysia and South Africa.

Finally, on 2 October 2023, the IKF confirmed that Philippines would replace China.

Team	Date of qualification	Method of qualification	Finals appearance	Previous appearance	IKF Ranking (Note: The rankings are shown as of January 2023. These are the rankings used for the final draw.)
Australia	4 December 2022	IKF Asia-Oceania Korfball Championship 2022 4th place	11th	2019	14
Belgium	9 August 2019	Automatic qualification	12th	2019	2
Brazil	20 December 2022	IKF Pan-American Korfball Championship 2022 2nd place	2nd	2015	20
Catalonia	5 November 2022	IKF EU World Korfball Championship Qualifier-B 2022 1st place	10th	2019	9
Chinese Taipei	9 August 2019	Host	10th	2019	3
Czech Republic	9 August 2019	Automatic qualification	7th	2019	8
England	22 October 2022	IKF EU World Korfball Championship Qualifier-A 2022 1st place	12th (Note: Includes participations of Great Britain until 2003.)	2019	10
Germany	9 August 2019	Automatic qualification	12th (Note: Includes participations of Germany from 1978 to 1987.)	2019	4
Hong Kong	4 December 2022	IKF Asia-Oceania Korfball Championship 2022 7th place	4th	2019	15
Hungary	27 November 2022 (Note: Already finished 3rd at the IKF EU World Korfball Championship Qualifier-B 2022 on 5 November 2022. IKF decided on 27 November 2022 to expand the tournament, meaning the 3rd placed finishers also qualified.)	IKF EU World Korfball Championship Qualifier-B 2022 3rd place	5th	2019	11
India	4 December 2022	IKF Asia-Oceania Korfball Championship 2022 5th place	7th	2011	23
Ireland	1 January 2023 (Note: Already finished 4th at the IKF EU World Korfball Championship Qualifier-A 2022 on 22 October 2022. IKF decided on 27 November 2022 that the highest ranked 4th place finisher on 1st January 2023 would also qualify.)	Highest ranked 4th-place finisher of EU qualifiers	2nd	2019	18
Japan	4 December 2022	IKF Asia-Oceania Korfball Championship 2022 6th place	3rd	2019	19
Malaysia	10 July 2023 (Note: Appeared in the draw after being invited due to the withdrawals of Morocco and Zimbabwe.)	Invited after withdrawal of Morocco	1st	–	28
Netherlands	9 August 2019	Automatic qualification	12th	2019	1
New Zealand	4 December 2022	IKF Asia-Oceania Korfball Championship 2022 3rd place	2nd	2019	13
Philippines	2 October 2023 (Note: Appeared after the draw after being invited due to the withdrawal of China.)	Invited after withdrawal of China	1st	–	38
Poland	22 October 2022	IKF EU World Korfball Championship Qualifier-A 2022 2nd place	7th	2019	12
Portugal	9 August 2019	Automatic qualification	10th	2019	6
Slovakia	27 November 2022 (Note: Already finished 3rd at the IKF EU World Korfball Championship Qualifier-A 2022 on 5 November 2022. IKF decided on 27 November 2022 to expand the tournament, meaning the 3rd placed finishers also qualified.)	IKF EU World Korfball Championship Qualifier-A 2022 3rd place	4th	2019	16
South Africa	10 July 2023	Invited after withdrawal of Zimbabwe	8th	2019	24
Suriname	20 December 2022	IKF Pan-American Korfball Championship 2022 1st place	2nd	2019	7
Thailand	4 December 2022	IKF Asia-Oceania Korfball Championship 2022 8th place	1st	–	27
Turkey	5 November 2022	IKF EU World Korfball Championship Qualifier-B 2022 2nd place	1st	–	22

=== Format and draw ===
As the tournament was expanded from 20 to 24 teams, the IKF implemented a new format. Instead of five groups of four, the first stage of the tournament will now feature eight groups of three teams (Groups A through H). The top two teams from each group will progress to the second group stage which features four groups of four teams (Groups I through L). Results obtained against teams also progressing from the same group are retained in the second group stage. The top two teams of the second group stage will then move into the knockout stages, which will determine places 1 through 8.

Teams finishing third in the first round will be paired in four matches, with the four losing teams playing in a round robin phase for places 21 through 24. The four winning teams will progress and be placed in a knockout tournament with the teams finishing fourth in the second group stage of the main tournament, to determine places 13 through 20. Finally, the four teams finishing third in the second group stage will be put in a round robin group to determine places 9 through 12.

On 10 July 2023, the official IKF World Korfball Championships 2023 group draw took place. The top eight teams of the IKF Ranking were awarded spots in groups A-H respectively. According to their ranking, the remaining 16 teams were put into 4 pots. The teams in pot 1 were awarded spots in groups H-E, teams in pot 2 spots in groups D-A, teams in pot 3 spots in groups A-D and teams in pot 4 spots in groups E-H. If a group would consist of 3 teams from the same continent, the country drawn would be pushed to the next group. For example, Turkey was drawn in group A but was moved to group B as it already contained Netherlands and Slovakia from Europe. The pots for the draw are shown below.

Pot 1	Pot 2	Pot 3	Pot 4
Catalonia (9); England (10); Hungary (11); Poland (12)	New Zealand (13); Australia (14); Hong Kong (15); Slovakia (16)	Ireland (18); Japan (19); Brazil (20); Turkey (22)	India (23); South Africa (24); Thailand (27); Malaysia (28)

Just a few weeks before the tournament, 5th seed China withdrew from the tournament, with Philippines (38) invited in to take its place.

== First group stage ==
Competing countries were divided into eight groups of three teams (groups A through H). Teams in each group played one another on a round-robin basis, with the top two teams of each group advancing to the Second Group Stage.

=== Group A ===
Pos	Team	Pld	W	OTW	OTL	L	GF	GA	GD	Pts	Qualification	NED	SVK	BRA
1	Netherlands	2	2	0	0	0	79	16	+63	6	Second Group Stage: Group I		39–9	40–7
2	Slovakia	2	1	0	0	1	30	44	−14	3	Second Group Stage: Group I			21–5
3	Brazil	2	0	0	0	2	12	61	−49	0	3rd-place Playoffs			

=== Group B ===
Pos	Team	Pld	W	OTW	OTL	L	GF	GA	GD	Pts	Qualification	BEL	HKG	TUR
1	Belgium	2	2	0	0	0	75	18	+57	6	Second Group Stage: Group J		43–9	32–9
2	Hong Kong	2	0	1	0	1	27	60	−33	2	Second Group Stage: Group J			18–17 GG
3	Turkey	2	0	0	1	1	26	50	−24	1	3rd-place Playoffs			

=== Group C ===
Pos	Team	Pld	W	OTW	OTL	L	GF	GA	GD	Pts	Qualification	TPE	NZL	IRL
1	Chinese Taipei	2	2	0	0	0	68	21	+47	6	Second Group Stage: Group K		30–13	38–8
2	New Zealand	2	1	0	0	1	31	41	−10	3	Second Group Stage: Group K			18–11
3	Ireland	2	0	0	0	2	19	56	−37	0	3rd-place Playoffs			

=== Group D ===
Pos	Team	Pld	W	OTW	OTL	L	GF	GA	GD	Pts	Qualification	GER	AUS	JPN
1	Germany	2	2	0	0	0	43	16	+27	6	Second Group Stage: Group L		14–13	29–3
2	Australia	2	1	0	0	1	38	17	+21	3	Second Group Stage: Group L			25–3
3	Japan	2	0	0	0	2	6	54	−48	0	3rd-place Playoffs			

=== Group E ===
Pos	Team	Pld	W	OTW	OTL	L	GF	GA	GD	Pts	Qualification	ENG	IND	PHI
1	England	2	2	0	0	0	56	12	+44	6	Second Group Stage: Group L		26–10	
2	India	2	1	0	0	1	34	37	−3	3	Second Group Stage: Group L			
3	Philippines	2	0	0	0	2	13	54	−41	0	3rd-place Playoffs	2–30	11–24	

=== Group F ===
Pos	Team	Pld	W	OTW	OTL	L	GF	GA	GD	Pts	Qualification	POR	POL	RSA
1	Portugal	2	2	0	0	0	50	12	+38	6	Second Group Stage: Group K		16–9	34–3
2	Poland	2	1	0	0	1	32	20	+12	3	Second Group Stage: Group K			23–4
3	South Africa	2	0	0	0	2	7	57	−50	0	3rd-place Playoffs			

=== Group G ===
Pos	Team	Pld	W	OTW	OTL	L	GF	GA	GD	Pts	Qualification	SUR	HUN	MAS
1	Suriname	2	2	0	0	0	49	13	+36	6	Second Group Stage: Group J		22–8	27–5
2	Hungary	2	1	0	0	1	33	27	+6	3	Second Group Stage: Group J			25–5
3	Malaysia	2	0	0	0	2	10	52	−42	0	3rd-place Playoffs			

=== Group H ===
Pos	Team	Pld	W	OTW	OTL	L	GF	GA	GD	Pts	Qualification	CZE	CAT	THA
1	Czech Republic	2	2	0	0	0	49	20	+29	6	Second Group Stage: Group I		25–15	24–5
2	Catalonia	2	1	0	0	1	39	32	+7	3	Second Group Stage: Group I			24–7
3	Thailand	2	0	0	0	2	12	48	−36	0	3rd-place Playoffs			

== Second round ==
=== Second group stage ===
Four groups of four are formed, with teams keeping the results against teams they already met during the first group stage.

==== Group I ====
Pos	Team	Pld	W	OTW	OTL	L	GF	GA	GD	Pts	Qualification	NED	CZE	CAT	SVK
1	Netherlands	3	3	0	0	0	118	32	+86	9	Knockout stage		37–9	40–14	39–9 (Note: Carried over from first group stage)
2	Czech Republic	3	2	0	0	1	55	67	−12	6	Knockout stage			25–15	
3	Catalonia	3	1	0	0	2	48	75	−27	3	Finals for 9th–12th place				
4	Slovakia	3	0	0	0	3	32	79	−47	0	Finals for 13th–20th place		13–21	10–19	

==== Group J ====
Pos	Team	Pld	W	OTW	OTL	L	GF	GA	GD	Pts	Qualification	BEL	SUR	HUN	HKG
1	Belgium	3	3	0	0	0	92	30	+62	9	Knockout stage		15–8	34–13	43–9 (Note: Carried over from first group stage)
2	Suriname	3	2	0	0	1	52	31	+21	6	Knockout stage			22–8	
3	Hungary	3	1	0	0	2	48	77	−29	3	Finals for 9th–12th place				
4	Hong Kong	3	0	0	0	3	38	92	−54	0	Finals for 13th–20th place		8–22	21–27	

Updated to match(es) played on 24 October 2023. Source:

==== Group K ====
Pos	Team	Pld	W	OTW	OTL	L	GF	GA	GD	Pts	Qualification	TPE	POR	POL	NZL
1	Chinese Taipei	3	3	0	0	0	85	42	+43	9	Knockout stage		24–22	31–7	30–13 (Note: Carried over from first group stage)
2	Portugal	3	2	0	0	1	60	40	+20	6	Knockout stage			16–9	
3	Poland	3	1	0	0	2	35	57	−22	3	Finals for 9th–12th place				
4	New Zealand	3	0	0	0	3	30	71	−41	0	Finals for 13th–20th place		7–22	10–19	

==== Group L ====
Pos	Team	Pld	W	OTW	OTL	L	GF	GA	GD	Pts	Qualification	GER	ENG	AUS	IND
1	Germany	3	3	0	0	0	64	31	+33	9	Knockout stage		15–8	14–13 (Note: Carried over from first group stage)	35–10
2	England	3	2	0	0	1	53	32	+21	6	Knockout stage				26–10
3	Australia	3	1	0	0	2	44	45	−1	3	Finals for 9th–12th place		7–19		24–12
4	India	3	0	0	0	3	32	85	−53	0	Finals for 13th–20th place				

=== 3rd-place Playoffs ===
The teams finishing third during the First Group Stage are paired with each other. In the 3rd-place Playoffs, teams winning their first match play a second round to determine the order amongst winners, but all four will move on to play for places 13 through 20 in a knockout tournament involving losing teams from the Second Group Stage. Teams losing their first match in the 3rd-place Playoffs are grouped together in a group of four playing for places 21 through 24.

23 October 2023
14:00 UTC+08:00

Brazil	6–14	Thailand
	report

23 October 2023
15:45 UTC+08:00

Turkey	15–7	Malaysia
	report

23 October 2023
17:30 UTC+08:00

Ireland	24–15	South Africa
	report

23 October 2023
19:00 UTC+08:00

Japan	16–7	Philippines
	report

==== Winners' playoff ====
Matches below serve only to determine seeding going into the finals for 13th–20th place, which all four teams will take part in irrespective of the below results.

24 October 2023
17:30 UTC+08:00

Thailand	11–14	Ireland
	report

24 October 2023
19:00 UTC+08:00

Turkey	21–13	Japan
	report

== Knockout stage ==
=== Finals ===
Fifth place
Germany	10
Suriname	26
Seventh place
England	13
Portugal	19

Consolation semifinals
Germany	20
England	14
Portugal	14
Suriname	17

Quarterfinals
Germany	19
Czech Republic	20
Netherlands	36
England	2
Belgium	26
Portugal	18
Chinese Taipei	19
Suriname	15

Semifinals
Czech Republic	13
Netherlands	41
Belgium	19
Chinese Taipei	21

Final
Netherlands	27
Chinese Taipei	9
Third place
Czech Republic	11
Belgium	26

=== Finals for 9th–12th place ===
These places will be decided through a round-robin stage only, between the teams finishing third in their respective groups of the Second Group Stage.

Pos	Team	Pld	W	OTW	OTL	L	GF	GA	GD	Pts	Rank	HUN	CAT	POL	AUS
1	Hungary	3	2	0	0	1	46	43	+3	6 (Note: HTH: Catalonia 18 – 21 Hungary)	9th			15–14	10–11
2	Catalonia	3	2	0	0	1	65	50	+15	6	10th	18–21		21–16	26–13
3	Poland	3	1	0	0	2	41	46	−5	3 (Note: HTH: Poland 11 – 10 Australia)	11th				11–10
4	Australia	3	1	0	0	2	34	47	−13	3	12th				

Updated to match(es) played on 27 October 2023. Source:

=== Finals for 13th–20th place ===
Seventeenth place
Thailand	9
Ireland	13
Nineteenth place
Japan	14
India	21

Consolation semifinals
Thailand	17
Japan	15
Ireland	24
India	18

Quarterfinals
Thailand	14
Slovakia	23
Japan	10
Hong Kong	22
Ireland	12
New Zealand	13
Turkey	19
India	6

Semifinals
Slovakia	10
Hong Kong	21
New Zealand	12
Turkey	19

Thirteenth place
Hong Kong	13
Turkey	16
Fifteenth place
Slovakia	17
New Zealand	11

=== Finals for 21st–24th place ===
These places will be decided through a round-robin stage only, between the four teams losing the 3rd-place Playoffs.

Pos	Team	Pld	W	OTW	OTL	L	GF	GA	GD	Pts	Rank	MAS	BRA	RSA	PHI
1	Malaysia	3	3	0	0	0	69	32	+37	9	21st			21–9	32–10
2	Brazil	3	2	0	0	1	42	37	+5	6	22nd	13–16		14–13	15–8
3	South Africa	3	1	0	0	2	43	49	−6	3	23rd				21–14
4	Philippines	3	0	0	0	3	32	68	−36	0	24th				

Updated to match(es) played on 24 October 2023. Source:

== Top scorers ==
Rank	Name	Goals
1	(Netherlands) Fleur Hoek	33
2	(Suriname) Vladimir Slot	29
3	(Netherlands) Ran Faber	28
4	(Netherlands) Alwin Out	27
4	(Chinese Taipei) Ya-wen Lin	27
6	(Germany) Steffen Heppekausen	26
7	(Republic of Ireland) Elizabeth Tighe	25
8	(Republic of Ireland) Chelsie Browne	24
8	(Poland) Tamara Siemieniuk	24
10	(Hungary) Zsolt Ferenc Majer	23
10	(New Zealand) Torsten Ball	23
10	(Portugal) Luise Costa Ruivo	23
10	(Brazil) Leonardo Martins Bernardino	23

== Final ranking ==
Key
	Qualified for the 2025 World Games
†	Qualified for the 2024 European A-Championship
‡	Qualified for the 2024 European B-Championship

Rank	Team
1st place, gold medalist(s)	Netherlands †
2nd place, silver medalist(s)	Chinese Taipei
3rd place, bronze medalist(s)	Belgium †
4	Czech Republic †
5	Suriname
6	Germany †
7	Portugal †
8	England †
9	Hungary †
10	Catalonia †
11	Poland ‡
12	Australia
13	Turkey ‡
14	Hong Kong
15	Slovakia ‡
16	New Zealand
17	Ireland ‡
18	Thailand
19	India
20	Japan
21	Malaysia
22	Brazil
23	South Africa
24	Philippines

== See also ==
- List of sporting events in Taiwan
