= Philippines national korfball team =

Philippines
- Association: Philippine Korfball Federation (KKF)
- IKF membership: 2014
- IKF code: PHI (Philippines)
- IKF rank: 42 (Dec. 2020)

World Championships
- Appearances: 1
- First appearance: 2023
- Best result: 24th place

Asia-Oceania Championship
- Appearances: 2
- First appearance: 2018
- Best result: 10th place

The Philippines national korfball team is the team which represents the Philippines in international korfball competitions. It is sanctioned and managed by the Philippine Korfball Federation.

== Background ==
Korfball was introduced in the Philippines at the University of Santo Tomas (UST) in 2007. Korfball was brought in by a delegation of UST's Institute of Physical Education and Athletics which attended a korfball seminar workshop in Hong Kong. The Philippine Korfball Federation (PKF) was established within the year. The PKF became a member of the International Korfball Federation (IKF) on September 13, 2014.

A national youth team was formed which joined the 2015 Under-23 Asia-Oceania Korfball Championship; their first IKF-sanctioned international event. A senior team was eventually formed with the Philippines making their Asia-Oceania Korfball Championship debut in the 2018 edition which was hosted in Japan.

The Philippines gained a place in the 2023 IKF World Korfball Championship in Taipei via an invite after China withdrew.

== Tournament history ==
World Championships
Year	Championship	Host	Classification
2023	12th World Championship	Taipei (Chinese Taipei)	24th place

Asia-Oceania Championships
Year	Championship	Host	Classification
2014	9th Asia-Oceania Championship	Hong Kong	Did not enter
2018	10th Asia-Oceania Championship	Saitama (Japan)	10th
2022	11th Asia-Oceania Championship	Pattaya (Thailand)	11th
