= 2018 Asia-Oceania Korfball Championship =

Sporting match

Tournament details
- Host country: Japan
- City: Saitama
- Dates: 29 July 2018– 5 August 2018
- Teams: 10
- Venue: 1 (in 1 host city)

Final positions
- Champions: Chinese Taipei (9th title)
- Runners-up: China
- Third place: Australia
- Fourth place: Hong Kong

Tournament statistics
- Matches played: 29
- Top scorer: (China) Dongjie Zhang (27 Goals)

The 2018 Asia-Oceania Korfball Championship was held in Saitama, Japan with 10 national teams in competition, from July 29 to August 5. It is the tenth edition of the Asia-Oceania Korfball Championship and serves as a qualifier for the 2019 IKF World Korfball Championship, with the top 6 teams qualifying (with a minimum of 1 for Oceania). Chinese Taipei are the defending champions and have all previous editions, except the edition of 2004 which was won by Australia.

== Group stage ==
The ten participating teams were drawn into two groups of five, with teams in each group playing one another in a round-robin basis. The top two teams in each group qualify for the semi-finals, while the teams finishing third and fourth playoff for places 5 to 8. The two teams finishing last will play for 9th place.

=== Group A ===
Pos	Team	Pld	W	OTW	OTL	L	GF	GA	GD	Pts	Qualification
1	Chinese Taipei	4	4	0	0	0	141	45	+96	12	Semi-finals
2	Australia	4	3	0	0	1	92	48	+44	9	Semi-finals
3	South Korea	4	2	0	0	2	49	89	−40	6	Play-offs
4	Macau	4	1	0	0	3	67	63	+4	3	Play-offs
5	Philippines	4	0	0	0	4	37	115	−78	0	

Source: IKF

Team 1	Score	Team 2
Macau	25 − 4	Philippines
Chinese Taipei	39 − 9	South Korea
Chinese Taipei	37 − 9	Macau
Australia	30 − 5	South Korea
Australia	23 − 8	Macau
Chinese Taipei	38 − 15	Philippines
South Korea	25 − 10	Philippines
Chinese Taipei	27 − 12	Australia
Australia	27 − 8	Philippines
South Korea	14 − 10	Macau

=== Group B ===
Pos	Team	Pld	W	OTW	OTL	L	GF	GA	GD	Pts	Qualification
1	China	4	4	0	0	0	126	52	+74	12	Semi-finals
2	Hong Kong	4	3	0	0	1	78	48	+30	9	Semi-finals
3	Japan	4	2	0	0	2	52	73	−21	6	Play-offs
4	New Zealand	4	1	0	0	3	62	59	+3	3	Play-offs
5	Indonesia	4	0	0	0	4	33	119	−86	0	

Source: IKF

Team 1	Score	Team 2
Japan	10 − 9	New Zealand
Indonesia	3 − 25	Hong Kong
Japan	9 − 30	China
Hong Kong	17 − 10	New Zealand
Indonesia	4 − 28	New Zealand
Hong Kong	17 − 26	China
China	42 − 11	Indonesia
Japan	9 − 19	Hong Kong
New Zealand	15 − 28	China
Japan	24 − 15	Indonesia

== Knockout stage ==
=== Semi-finals ===
Semi-finals
China	23
Australia	14
Chinese Taipei	37
Hong Kong	10

Final
China	13
Chinese Taipei	22
Third place
Australia	18
Hong Kong	17

=== 5th–8th place play-offs ===
Semi-finals
South Korea	3
New Zealand	22
Japan	15
Macau	7

Final
New Zealand	10
Japan	13
Third place
South Korea	7
Macau	8

=== 9th–10th place play-offs ===
Final
Philippines	12
Indonesia	25

== Final standings ==
The top 6 qualified for the 2019 IKF World Korfball Championship.

Final standings
1st place, gold medalist(s)	Chinese Taipei
2nd place, silver medalist(s)	China
3rd place, bronze medalist(s)	Australia
4	Hong Kong
5	Japan
6	New Zealand
7	Macau
8	South Korea
9	Indonesia
10	Philippines
