= Korfball at the 2022 World Games =

- Venue: Birmingham Jefferson Convention Complex
- Dates: 13–17 July 2022
- No. of events: 1
- Competitors: 112 from 8 nations

Medalists
1st place, gold medalist(s)		Netherlands
2nd place, silver medalist(s)		Belgium
3rd place, bronze medalist(s)		Chinese Taipei

The korfball competition at the 2022 World Games took place in July 2022, in Birmingham in United States, at the Birmingham Jefferson Convention Complex. Originally scheduled to take place in July 2021, the Games were rescheduled for July 2022 as a result of the 2020 Summer Olympics postponement due to the COVID-19 pandemic.

== Qualification ==
A total of 8 teams competed in the korfball event at the 2022 World Games.

The 2019 IKF World Korfball Championship (IKF WKC) acted as the qualification tournament. The eight best teams qualified for the World Games, because the top 8 consisted of participants from at least four different continents.

=== Qualified teams ===
Team	Date of qualification	Method of qualification	Finals appearance	Previous appearance
Netherlands	5 August 2019	Finished first at the 2019 IKF WKC.	10th	2017
Belgium	5 August 2019	Finished second at the 2019 IKF WKC.	10th	2017
Chinese Taipei	5 August 2019	Finished third at the 2019 IKF WKC.	9th	2017
China	5 August 2019	Finished fourth at the 2019 IKF WKC.	2nd	2017
Germany	5 August 2019	Finished fifth at the 2019 IKF WKC.	9th	2017
Suriname	5 August 2019	Finished sixth at the 2019 IKF WKC.	1st	-
Czech Republic	5 August 2019	Finished seventh at the 2019 IKF WKC.	4th	2013
Portugal	5 August 2019	Finished eight at the 2019 IKF WKC.	5th	2013

== Preliminary round ==
=== Group A ===
Pos	Team	Pld	W	OTW	OTL	L	GF	GA	GD	Pts	Qualification
1	Netherlands	3	3	0	0	0	101	42	+59	9	Semifinals
2	Chinese Taipei	3	2	0	0	1	58	62	−4	6	Semifinals
3	Portugal	3	1	0	0	2	40	61	−21	3	5–8th place semifinals
4	Czech Republic	3	0	0	0	3	41	75	−34	0	5–8th place semifinals

Source: 2022 World Games

July 13, 2022	Netherlands	29–13	Portugal	Birmingham
13:15		Report		Stadium: Birmingham Jefferson Convention Complex

July 13, 2022	Chinese Taipei	21–17	Czech Republic	Birmingham
17:00		Report		Stadium: Birmingham Jefferson Convention Complex

July 14, 2022	Netherlands	34–18	Chinese Taipei	Birmingham
11:30		Report		Stadium: Birmingham Jefferson Convention Complex

July 14, 2022	Portugal	16–13	Czech Republic	Birmingham
18:45		Report		Stadium: Birmingham Jefferson Convention Complex

July 15, 2022	Chinese Taipei	19–11	Portugal	Birmingham
13:15		Report		Stadium: Birmingham Jefferson Convention Complex

July 15, 2022	Netherlands	38–11	Czech Republic	Birmingham
17:00		Report		Stadium: Birmingham Jefferson Convention Complex

=== Group B ===
Pos	Team	Pld	W	OTW	OTL	L	GF	GA	GD	Pts	Qualification
1	Belgium	3	3	0	0	0	82	34	+48	9	Semifinals
2	Germany	3	2	0	0	1	51	56	−5	6	Semifinals
3	Suriname	3	1	0	0	2	61	72	−11	3	5–8th place semifinals
4	China	3	0	0	0	3	38	70	−32	0	5–8th place semifinals

Source: 2022 World Games

July 13, 2022	Belgium	26–9	Germany	Birmingham
11:30		Report		Stadium: Birmingham Jefferson Convention Complex

July 13, 2022	China	19–25	Suriname	Birmingham
18:45		Report		Stadium: Birmingham Jefferson Convention Complex

July 14, 2022	Belgium	27–11	China	Birmingham
13:15		Report		Stadium: Birmingham Jefferson Convention Complex

July 14, 2022	Germany	24–22	Suriname	Birmingham
17:00		Report		Stadium: Birmingham Jefferson Convention Complex

July 15, 2022	China	8–18	Germany	Birmingham
11:30		Report		Stadium: Birmingham Jefferson Convention Complex

July 15, 2022	Belgium	29–14	Suriname	Birmingham
18:45		Report		Stadium: Birmingham Jefferson Convention Complex

== Knockout stage ==
=== 5–8th place semifinals ===
July 16, 2022	Portugal	16–17	China	Birmingham
18:45		Report		Stadium: Birmingham Jefferson Convention Complex

July 16, 2022	Suriname	18–14	Czech Republic	Birmingham
18:45		Report		Stadium: Birmingham Jefferson Convention Complex

=== Semifinals ===
July 16, 2022	Netherlands	26–12	Germany	Birmingham
11:30		Report		Stadium: Birmingham Jefferson Convention Complex

July 16, 2022	Belgium	19–18	Chinese Taipei	Birmingham
18:45		Report		Stadium: Birmingham Jefferson Convention Complex

=== Fifth place game ===
July 17, 2022	China	13–12	Suriname	Birmingham
9:30		Report		Stadium: Birmingham Jefferson Convention Complex

=== Third place game ===
July 17, 2022	Germany	22–23	Chinese Taipei	Birmingham
11:15		Report		Stadium: Birmingham Jefferson Convention Complex

=== Final ===
July 17, 2022	Netherlands	23–12	Belgium	Birmingham
14:00		Report		Stadium: Birmingham Jefferson Convention Complex

== Final ranking ==
Rank	Team
Gold medal	Netherlands
Silver medal	Belgium
Bronze medal	Chinese Taipei
4	Germany
5	China
6	Suriname
7	Czech Republic
7	Portugal

== Medalists ==
Event	Gold	Silver	Bronze
Mixed tournament	Netherlands; Barbara Brouwer; Esther Cordus; Terrenc Griemink; Anouk Haars; Fleur Hoek; Jelmer Jonker; Laurens Leeuwenhoek; Jessica Lokhorst; Alwin Out; Daan Preuninger; Harjan Visscher; Sanne van der Werff; Olav van Wijngaarden; Brett Zuijdwegt	Belgium; Kian Amorgaste; Julie Caluwe; Lars Courtens; Lauren Denis; Shiara Driesen; Amber Engels; Jari Hardies; Lennert Impens; Lisa Pauwels; Stien Reyntjens; Cedric Schoumacker; Saar Seys; Brent Struyf; Jordan de Vogelaere	Chinese Taipei; Chan Ya-han; Chang Chieh-sheng; Chang Shu-chi; Chen Chun-ta; Chen Cin; Chiu Han-sheng; Huang Tzu-yao; Kao Chen-yu; Lin Ya-wen; Lo Kai-yeh; Peng Chien-chin; Tai Wei-jhe; Wang Yi-wen; Wu Chun-hsien
