= 2019 IKF World Korfball Championship =

Tournament details
- Host country: South Africa
- Dates: 1–10 August
- Teams: 20
- Venue(s): 2 (in 1 host city)

Final positions
- Champions: Netherlands (10th title)
- Runners-up: Belgium
- Third place: Chinese Taipei
- Fourth place: China

Tournament statistics
- Top scorer(s): (China) Jing Zhao (39 goals)

The 11th IKF World Korfball Championship was held in August 2019 in Durban, South Africa and won by the Netherlands. The International Korfball Federation awarded the hosting rights for the tournament to South Africa on 7 November 2015, ahead of the bid by New Zealand.

In October 2016, the number of teams participating was increased from 16 to 20. The four extra places were awarded to the Americas (1), Africa (1) and Asia & Oceania (2). The Americas are now allotted 2 spots, Africa 2 spots, Europe 10 spots, and Asia and Oceania 6 spots (with a minimum of 1 for Oceania). Due to withdrawals, in the end there will only be 1 team participating from the Americas and Africa (each), leading to 11 for Europe and 7 for Asia & Oceania.

This tournament also acted as the qualification tournament for the World Games 2022, with eight teams qualifying for the World Games. The IKF aimed to have teams from up to four continents present at the World Games, therefore the top eight finishing nations qualified, with the exception that when a team finished in the top eleven as the highest finishing team from a top four continent not already having a qualifier, then this team would have qualified instead of the last placed team from an already qualified continent. This de facto meant that the top five finishers were always certain of qualification, while the outcome for the teams in places six through eight depended on the continent of origin of teams up to place eleven. Additionally, Catalonia was ineligible for qualification as the World Games are contested by national instead of regional teams.

== Teams ==
=== Qualification ===
In February 2019, the IKF announced that both Dominican Republic and Zimbabwe withdrew from the tournament despite both having qualified for the first time ever. First reserve of the Americas (Brazil) was unable to step in and ultimately the first reserves of Europe (Slovakia) and Asia (Macau) were invited and accepted the invitation.

Team	Date of qualification	Method of qualification	Finals appearance	Previous appearance	IKF Ranking (Note: The rankings are shown as of December 2018. These are the rankings used for the final draw.)
Australia	2 August 2018	2018 Asia-Oceania Korfball Championship 3rd place	10th	2015	10
Belgium	15 October 2018	2018 IKF European Korfball A-Championship top-8 finish	11th	2015	3
Catalonia	15 October 2018	2018 IKF European Korfball A-Championship top-8 finish	9th	2015	12
China	1 August 2018	2018 Asia-Oceania Korfball Championship runners-up	4th	2015	4
Chinese Taipei	31 July 2018	2018 Asia-Oceania Korfball Championship winners	9th	2015	2
Czech Republic	16 October 2018	2018 IKF European Korfball A-Championship top-8 finish	6th	2015	7
England	15 October 2018	2018 IKF European Korfball A-Championship top-8 finish	11th	2015	6
Germany	14 October 2018	2018 IKF European Korfball A-Championship top-8 finish	11th	2015	5
Hong Kong	1 August 2018	2018 Asia-Oceania Korfball Championship 4th place	3rd	2015	11
Hungary	16 October 2018	2018 IKF European Korfball A-Championship top-8 finish	4th	2015	9
Ireland	18 October 2018	2018 IKF European Korfball B-Championship top-2 finish	1st	–	20
Japan	3 August 2018	2018 Asia-Oceania Korfball Championship 5th place	2nd	1999	24
Macau	14 February 2019	Invited	1st	–	30
Netherlands	14 October 2018	2018 IKF European Korfball A-Championship top-8 finish	11th	2015	1
New Zealand	3 August 2018	2018 Asia-Oceania Korfball Championship 6th place	1st	–	16
Poland	18 October 2018	2018 IKF European Korfball B-Championship top-2 finish	6th	2015	13
Portugal	15 October 2018	2018 IKF European Korfball A-Championship top-8 finish	9th	2015	8
Slovakia	14 February 2019	Invited	3rd	2003	17
South Africa	7 November 2015	Host country	7th	2015	15
Suriname	3 March 2018	2018 Pan-American Korfball Championship champions	1st	–	21

2. includes participations of Great Britain until 2003.
1. includes participations of Germany from 1978 to 1987.

=== Draw ===
For the draw, the teams were allocated to four pots based on the IKF World Korfball Ranking of December 2018. Pot 1 contained the best five teams (which were automatically assigned to pools A through E), pot 2 contained the next best five teams, and so on for pots 3 and 4, with the exception of Suriname which was placed into pot 3 instead of 4 as the IKF specified that each continental champion would at least be positioned in pot 3. Finally, it is not allowed to have four European, three Asian or two Oceanian countries in the same pool. In case this happens during the draw, the relevant country will change position with the country drawn after. In case this is not possible, the change will be made with the country that has been drawn before.

The draw took place on 20 April 2019.

Pot 1	Pot 2	Pot 3	Pot 4
Netherlands (1, CH Europe); Chinese Taipei (2, CH Asia-Oceania); Belgium (3); China (4); Germany (5)	England (6); Czech Republic (7); Portugal (8); Hungary (9); Australia (10)	Hong Kong (11); Catalonia (12); Poland (13); South Africa (15, CH Africa); Suriname (21, CH Pan-America)	New Zealand (16); Slovakia (17); Ireland (20); Japan (24); Macau (30)

== Group stage ==
Competing countries will be divided into five groups of four teams (groups A to E). Teams in each group played one another in a round-robin basis, with the top three teams of each group and the best fourth-placed team advancing to the knockout stage.

=== Group A ===
Pos	Team	Pld	W	OTW	OTL	L	GF	GA	GD	Pts	Qualification
1	Netherlands	3	3	0	0	0	99	22	+77	9	Round of 16
2	Czech Republic	3	2	0	0	1	47	48	−1	6	Round of 16
3	Catalonia	3	1	0	0	2	39	65	−26	3	Round of 16
4	New Zealand	3	0	0	0	3	29	79	−50	0	Finals for 17th–20th places

First match(es) will be played: 1 August 2019. Source:

1 August 2019
11:00

Netherlands	41 – 5	New Zealand
	Report

Referee: Wing Hung Lee

1 August 2019
12:45

Czech Republic	17 – 14	Catalonia
	Report

Referee: Ugurtan Akbulut

2 August 2019
12:00

Czech Republic	23 – 11	New Zealand
	Report

Referee: Dan Lin Huang

2 August 2019
13:45

Netherlands	35 – 10	Catalonia
	Report

Referee: Pardeep Dahiya

3 August 2019
12:00

Catalonia	15 – 13	New Zealand
	Report

Referee: Steve Jones

3 August 2019
13:45

Netherlands	23 – 7	Czech Republic
	Report

Referee: Miguel Wensma

=== Group B ===
Pos	Team	Pld	W	OTW	OTL	L	GF	GA	GD	Pts	Qualification
1	Chinese Taipei	3	3	0	0	0	92	37	+55	9	Round of 16
2	Poland	3	2	0	0	1	44	67	−23	6	Round of 16
3	Australia	3	1	0	0	2	55	71	−16	3	Round of 16
4	Ireland	3	0	0	0	3	47	63	−16	0	Round of 16

First match(es) will be played: 1 August 2019. Source:

1 August 2019
10:00

Chinese Taipei	27 – 14	Ireland
	Report

Referee: Peter Van Der Terp

1 August 2019
11:45

Australia	19 – 21	Poland
	Report

Referee: Carlos Faria

2 August 2019
12:00

Australia	22 – 20	Ireland
	Report

Referee: Lukas Pazourek

2 August 2019
13:45

Chinese Taipei	35 – 9	Poland
	Report

Referee: Tina Van Grimberge

3 August 2019
12:00

Chinese Taipei	30 - 14	Australia
	Report

Referee: Pardeep Dahiya

3 August 2019
13:45

Poland	14 – 13	Ireland
	Report

Referee: Lukas Filip

=== Group C ===
Pos	Team	Pld	W	OTW	OTL	L	GF	GA	GD	Pts	Qualification
1	Belgium	3	3	0	0	0	99	32	+67	9	Round of 16
2	England	3	2	0	0	1	67	54	+13	6	Round of 16
3	Slovakia	3	1	0	0	2	40	74	−34	3	Round of 16
4	Hong Kong	3	0	0	0	3	40	86	−46	0	Finals for 17th–20th places

First match(es) will be played: 1 August 2019. Source:

1 August 2019
14:30

Belgium	34 – 12	Slovakia
	Report

Referee: Steve Jones

1 August 2019
20:00

England	30 – 17	Hong Kong
	Report

Referee: Lukas Pazourek

2 August 2019
15:30

England	24 – 10	Slovakia
	Report

Referee: Luke Rosie

2 August 2019
17:15

Belgium	38 – 7	Hong Kong
	Report

Referee: Ugurtan Akbulut

3 August 2019
19:00

Belgium	27 – 13	England
	Report

Referee: Carlos Faria

3 August 2019
19:00

Hong Kong	16 – 18	Slovakia
	Report

Referee: Peter Van Der Terp

=== Group D ===
Pos	Team	Pld	W	OTW	OTL	L	GF	GA	GD	Pts	Qualification
1	China	3	2	1	0	0	92	52	+40	8	Round of 16
2	Suriname	3	2	0	1	0	77	37	+40	7	Round of 16
3	Hungary	3	1	0	0	2	72	55	+17	3	Round of 16
4	Macau	3	0	0	0	3	14	111	−97	0	Finals for 17th–20th places

First match(es) will be played: 1 August 2019. Source:

1 August 2019
13:30

China	42 – 8	Macau
	Report

Referee: Pardeep Dahiya

1 August 2019
18:15

Hungary	12 – 24	Suriname
	Report

Referee: Lukas Filip

2 August 2019
17:15

Hungary	36 – 2	Macau
	Report

Referee: Carlos Faria

2 August 2019
19:00

China	21 – 20	Suriname
	Report

Referee: Miguel Wensma

3 August 2019
15:30

Suriname	33 – 4	Macau
	Report

Referee: Dan Lin Huang

3 August 2019
17:15

China	29 – 24	Hungary
	Report

Referee: Ugurtan Akbulut

=== Group E ===
Pos	Team	Pld	W	OTW	OTL	L	GF	GA	GD	Pts	Qualification
1	Portugal	3	3	0	0	0	83	22	+61	9	Round of 16
2	Germany	3	2	0	0	1	76	32	+44	6	Round of 16
3	Japan	3	1	0	0	2	39	80	−41	3	Round of 16
4	South Africa	3	0	0	0	3	20	84	−64	0	Finals for 17th–20th places

First match(es) will be played: 1 August 2019. Source:

1 August 2019
17:30

South Africa	4 – 36	Portugal
	Report

Referee: Dan Lin Huang

1 August 2019
19:15

Germany	37 – 12	Japan
	Report

Referee: Luke Rosie

2 August 2019
15:30

Portugal	33 – 8	Japan
	Report

Referee: Peter Van Der Terp

2 August 2019
19:00

South Africa	6 – 29	Germany
	Report

Referee: Steve Jones

3 August 2019
15:30

Germany	10 – 14	Portugal
	Report

Referee: Tina Van Grimberge

3 August 2019
17:15

South Africa	10 – 19	Japan
	Report

Referee: Wing Hung Lee

=== Ranking of fourth-placed teams ===
Pos	Grp	Team	Pld	W	OTW	OTL	L	GF	GA	GD	Pts	Qualification
1	B	Ireland	3	0	0	0	3	47	63	−16	0	Knockout stage
2	C	Hong Kong	3	0	0	0	3	40	86	−46	0	Finals for 17th–20th places
3	A	New Zealand	3	0	0	0	3	25	78	−53	0	Finals for 17th–20th places
4	E	South Africa	3	0	0	0	3	20	84	−64	0	Finals for 17th–20th places
5	D	Macau	3	0	0	0	3	14	111	−97	0	Finals for 17th–20th places

First match(es) will be played: 1 August 2019. Source:

== Knockout stage ==
=== Round of 16 ===
5 August 2019
15:30

Netherlands	34 - 7	Ireland
	Report

Westville Campus Hall 2, Durban
Referee: Dan Lin Huang

5 August 2019
15:30

Poland	9 - 22	Germany
	Report

Westville Campus Hall 1, Durban
Referee: Lukas Pazourek

5 August 2019
17:15

China	31 - 9	Slovakia
	Report

Westville Campus Hall 2, Durban
Referee: Tina Van Grimberge

5 August 2019
19:00

Portugal	15 - 11	Catalonia
	Report

Westville Campus Hall 1, Durban
Referee: Luke Rosie

5 August 2019
13:45

Chinese Taipei	42 - 22	Japan
	Report

Westville Campus Hall 2, Durban
Referee: Ugurtan Akbulut

5 August 2019
17:15

England	18 - 22	Suriname
	Report

Westville Campus Hall 1, Durban
Referee: Lukas Filip

5 August 2019
13:45

Belgium	26 - 7	Hungary
	Report$

Westville Campus Hall 1, Durban
Referee: Wing Hung Lee

5 August 2019
19:00

Czech Republic	27 - 15	Australia
	Report

Westville Campus Hall 2, Durban
Referee: Steve Jones

=== Quarter-finals ===
Fifth place
Germany	16
Suriname	8
Seventh place
Portugal	16
Czech Republic	17

Consolation semifinals
Germany	18
Portugal	15
Suriname	18
Czech Republic	5

Quarterfinals
Netherlands	25
Germany	9
China	25
Portugal	21
Chinese Taipei	20
Suriname	18
Belgium	27
Czech Republic	10

Semifinals
Netherlands	27
China	12
Chinese Taipei	19
Belgium	20

Final
Netherlands	31
Belgium	18
Third place
China	16
Chinese Taipei	25

=== Finals for 9th–16th places ===
13th place match
Slovakia	20
Australia	19
15th place match
Ireland	18
Japan	19

13th – 16th place play-offs
Ireland	14
Slovakia	18
Japan	13
Australia	21

9th – 16th place play-offs
Ireland	12
Poland	16
Slovakia	8
Catalonia	25
Japan	6
England	25
Hungary	22
Australia	15

9th – 12th place play-offs
Poland	14
Catalonia	15
England	20
Hungary	18

9th place match
Catalonia	15
England	19
11th place match
Poland	21
Hungary	13

=== Finals for 17th–20th places ===
==== Round-robin stage ====
Pos	Team	Pld	W	D	L	GF	GA	GD	Pts	Qualification
1	Hong Kong	3	3	0	0	57	37	+20	9	Ranking match 17th-18th
2	New Zealand	3	2	0	1	61	43	+18	6	Ranking match 17th-18th
3	South Africa	3	0	1	2	40	53	−13	1	Ranking match 19th-20th
4	Macau	3	0	1	2	31	56	−25	1	Ranking match 19th-20th

Updated to match(es) played on 8 August 2019. Source:

5 August 2019
12:00

South Africa	11 – 16	Hong Kong
	Report

Referee: Miguel Wensma (BEL)

5 August 2019
12:00

New Zealand	21 – 8	Macau
	Report

Referee: Peter Van Der Terp (NED)

6 August 2019
12:00

Hong Kong	19 – 7	Macau
	Report

Referee: Lukas Filip (CZE)

6 August 2019
12:00

South Africa	13 – 21	New Zealand
	Report

Referee: Lukas Pazourek (CZE)

7 August 2019
12:00

New Zealand	19 – 22	Hong Kong
	Report

Referee: Tina Van Grimberge (BEL)

8 August 2019
12:00

South Africa	16 – 16 (Note: At the final whistle the scores were even and when referee Lee invited the teams to play a golden goal period as per the rules of the tournament, they mutually declined, opting instead to save themselves for the 19th-20th place game to be played the very next day in which both teams would meet again.)	Macau
	Report

Referee: Wing Hung Lee (HKG)

==== 19th-20th place match ====
9 August 2019
12:00

South Africa	23 – 9	Macau
	Report

Referee: Pardeep Dahiya (IND)

==== 17th-18th place match ====
10 August 2019
09:00

Hong Kong	21 – 19	New Zealand
	Report

== Venue ==
Two venues are used to host all games this championship. Both are located on the Westville campus of the University of KwaZulu-Natal.

== Final standings ==
Key
Qualified for the 2022 World Games

Rank	Team
1st place, gold medalist(s)	Netherlands
2nd place, silver medalist(s)	Belgium
3rd place, bronze medalist(s)	Chinese Taipei
4	China
5	Germany
6	Suriname
7	Czech Republic
8	Portugal
9	England
10	Catalonia
11	Poland
12	Hungary
13	Slovakia
14	Australia
15	Japan
16	Ireland
17	Hong Kong
18	New Zealand
19	South Africa
20	Macau

== See also ==
- Korfball World Championship
- International Korfball Federation
