= 2006 Asia-Oceania Korfball Championship =

International sporting event

The 2006 Asia Oceania Korfball Championship was held in Hong Kong with 7 national teams in competition, from July 4 to 9. The top 4 teams qualified for the 2007 World Championships.

== First round ==
POOL A	Pts	P	W	L	PF	PA	DP
Australia	9	3	3	0	70	22	+48
India	6	3	2	1	50	50	0
New Zealand	3	3	1	2	44	36	+8
Macau	0	3	0	3	17	73	-56

POOL B	Pts	P	W	L	PF	PA	DP
Chinese Taipei	6	2	2	0	52	15	+37
Hong Kong	3	2	1	1	23	40	-17
China	0	2	0	1	19	39	-20

06/07/04	Australia	27–5	Macau
06/07/04	New Zealand	15–16	India
06/07/05	India	11–27	Australia
06/07/05	Macau	4–23	New Zealand
06/07/06	Macau	8–23	India
06/07/06	Australia	16–6	New Zealand

06/07/04	Hong Kong	16–11	China
06/07/05	China	8–23	Chinese Taipei
06/07/06	Chinese Taipei	29–7	Hong Kong

== Second round classification matches ==
3rds vs 2nds

06/07/07 / Hong Kong / 16–12 / New Zealand; 06/07/07 / China / 14–24 / India

== Final round ==
Semi-finals
July 8
Australia	22
Hong Kong	7
July 8
India	7
Chinese Taipei	21

Final
July 9
Australia	11
Chinese Taipei	17
Third place
July 9
Hong Kong	9
India	14

5th place

06/07/08 / New Zealand / 6–12 / China

Semifinals

06/07/08 / Australia / 22–7 / Hong Kong; 06/07/08 / Chinese Taipei / 21–6 / India

6th-7th places

06/07/09 / Macau / 1–21 / New Zealand

3rd-4th places

06/07/09 / Hong Kong / 9–14 / India

Final

06/07/09 / Australia / 11–17 / Chinese Taipei

== Final standings ==
Final standings
1st place, gold medalist(s)	Chinese Taipei
2nd place, silver medalist(s)	Australia
3rd place, bronze medalist(s)	India
4	Hong Kong
5	China
6	New Zealand
7	Macau

== See also ==
- Asia-Oceania Korfball Championship
