= IKF World Korfball Championship =

Quadrennial sports tournament

- Current season, competition or edition: 2023 IKF World Korfball Championship
- Sport: Korfball
- Founded: 1978
- No. of teams: 24 (finals)
- Continent: International (IKF)
- Most recent champions: Netherlands (11th title) (2023)
- Most titles: Netherlands (11 titles)
- Website: International Korfball Federation

The IKF World Korfball Championship is an international korfball competition contested by the national teams of the members of International Korfball Federation (IKF), the sport's global governing body. The championship has been awarded roughly every four years since the inaugural tournament in 1978. The current champions are the Netherlands, who won the 2023 IKF World Korfball Championship.

The 12 World Championships have been won by two different national teams. The Netherlands have won all but one time, losing only to Belgium in the 1991 Korfball World Championship.

== Results ==
World Korfball Championship results
#	Year	Host	Winners	Score	Runners-up	Third Place	Score	Fourth Place	Teams
1	1978	Netherlands	Netherlands	14–13 (a.e.t.)	Belgium	West Germany	20–15 (a.e.t.)	Great Britain	8
2	1984	Belgium	Netherlands	11–9	Belgium	West Germany	7–5	Great Britain	8
3	1987	Netherlands	Netherlands	9–7	Belgium	Great Britain	9–5 (a.e.t.)	Chinese Taipei	12
4	1991	Belgium	Belgium	11–10	Netherlands	Chinese Taipei	10–8	Germany	12
5	1995	India	Netherlands	21–13	Belgium	Portugal	13–11	Australia	12
6	1999	Australia	Netherlands	23–11	Belgium	Great Britain	24–22	Germany	12
7	2003	Netherlands	Netherlands	22–9	Belgium	Czech Republic	21–15	Chinese Taipei	16
8	2007	Czech Republic	Netherlands	23–10	Belgium	Czech Republic	19–14	Portugal	16
9	2011	China	Netherlands	32–26	Belgium	Chinese Taipei	33–16	Catalonia	16
10	2015	Belgium	Netherlands	27–18	Belgium	Chinese Taipei	21–12	England	16
11	2019	South Africa	Netherlands	31–18	Belgium	Chinese Taipei	25–16	China	20
12	2023	Taiwan	Netherlands	27–9	Chinese Taipei	Belgium	26–11	Czech Republic	24
13	2027	Netherlands							24

- a.e.t.: after extra time

== Teams reaching the top four ==
Teams to reach the top four
Team	Titles	Runners-up	Third place	Fourth place	Total top 4
Netherlands	11 (1978*, 1984, 1987*, 1995, 1999, 2003*, 2007, 2011, 2015, 2019, 2023)	1 (1991)	—	—	12
Belgium	1 (1991*)	10 (1978, 1984*, 1987, 1995, 1999, 2003, 2007, 2011, 2015*, 2019)	1 (2023)	—	12
Chinese Taipei	—	1 (2023*)	4 (1991, 2011, 2015, 2019)	2 (1987, 2003)	7
England#	—	—	2 (1987, 1999)	3 (1978, 1984, 2015)	5
Germany	—	—	2 (1978, 1984)	2 (1991, 1999)	4
Czech Republic	—	—	2 (2003, 2007*)	1 (2023)	3
Portugal	—	—	1 (1995)	1 (2007)	2
Australia	—	—	—	1 (1995)	1
Catalonia	—	—	—	1 (2011)	1
China	—	—	—	1 (2019)	1

* = hosts
^ = includes results representing West Germany between 1978 and 1987
# = includes results representing Great Britain between 1978 and 2003

== Ranking ==
Rank	Nation	Gold	Silver	Bronze	Total
1	Netherlands (NED)	11	1	0	12
2	Belgium (BEL)	1	10	1	12
3	Chinese Taipei (TPE)	0	1	4	5
4	Czech Republic (CZE)	0	0	2	2
4	Germany (GER)	0	0	2	2
4	Great Britain (GBR)	0	0	2	2
7	Portugal (POR)	0	0	1	1
Totals (7 entries)		12	12	12	36

== Appearances ==
=== Debut of teams ===
Each successive World Championship has had at least one team appearing for the first time.

Year	Debutants	Total
1978	Belgium; Great Britain; Luxembourg; Netherlands; Papua New Guinea; Spain; United States; West Germany	8
1984	Australia; France	2
1987	Aruba; Chinese Taipei; Indonesia; Portugal	4
1991	Armenia; Germany; India	3
1995	Czech Republic; Slovakia; South Africa	3
1999	Catalonia; Japan; Poland	3
2003	Hungary	1
2007	China; England; Russia	3
2011	Hong Kong; Wales	2
2015	Brazil	1
2019	Ireland; Macau; New Zealand; Suriname	4
2023	Malaysia; Philippines; Thailand; Turkey	4
2027	Morocco; Zimbabwe	(2)
Total		39 (41)

Note: The IKF considers Germany a successor to West Germany. Likewise, Catalonia is seen as a successor to Spain. Morocco and Zimbabwe are provisional, these countries have qualified, but historically several nations have withdrawn prior to the tournament.

=== Comprehensive team results by tournament ===
Legend

- 1st — Champions
- 2nd — Runners-up
- 3rd — Third place
- 4th — Fourth place
- TBD — To be determined (may still qualify for upcoming tournament)
- • — Did not qualify
- •• — Qualified but withdrew
- × — Did not enter / Banned / Entry not accepted
- — Hosts

For each tournament, the number of teams in each finals tournament (in brackets) are shown.

Team results by tournament
Team	1978 (8)	1984 (8)	1987 (12)	1991 (12)	1995 (12)	1999 (12)	2003 (16)	2007 (16)	2011 (16)	2015 (16)	2019 (20)	2023 (24)	2027 (24)
Argentina	×	×	×	×	×	×	×	×	×	×	•	×	×
Armenia	×	×	×	8th	9th	×	15th	×	×	×	×	×	×
Aruba	×	×	8th	10th	×	×	×	×	×	×	×	×	×
Australia	×	7th	6th	9th	4th	7th	7th	8th	12th	11th	14th	12th	TBD
Belgium	2nd	2nd	2nd	1st	2nd	2nd	2nd	2nd	2nd	2nd	2nd	3rd	q
Brazil	×	×	×	×	×	×	×	×	×	16th	•	22nd	q
Catalonia (Note: Catalonia is considered as the successor of Spain and only competed for the first time under the name Catalonia in 1999.)	6th	5th	11th	×	×	8th	9th	9th	4th	5th	10th	10th	q
China	×	×	×	×	×	×	×	16th	11th	7th	4th	••	TBD
Chinese Taipei	×	×	4th	3rd	5th	6th	4th	5th	3rd	3rd	3rd	2nd	TBD
Colombia	×	×	×	×	×	×	×	×	×	•	•	×	×
Costa Rica	×	×	×	×	×	×	×	×	×	×	•	×	×
Czech Republic	×	×	×	×	7th	×	3rd	3rd	8th	9th	7th	4th	q
Dominican Republic	×	×	×	×	×	×	×	×	×	×	••	×	×
England (Note: England is considered the successor team of Great Britain, which competed until (and including) 2003 but then split.)	4th	4th	3rd	5th	8th	3rd	5th	7th	5th	4th	9th	8th	q
France	×	8th	12th	×	×	×	×	×	×	×	•	×	×
Germany (Note: Germany competed as West Germany until 1990.)	3rd	3rd	5th	4th	6th	4th	8th	11th	9th	6th	5th	6th	q
Hong Kong	×	×	×	×	×	×	×	×	14th	12th	17th	14th	TBD
Hungary	×	×	×	×	×	×	10th	10th	•	13th	12th	9th	q
India	×	×	×	11th	12th	11th	14th	12th	13th	×	×	19th	TBD
Indonesia	×	×	10th	12th	×	×	×	×	×	•	•	×	TBD
Ireland	×	×	×	×	×	×	×	×	•	•	16th	17th	•
Japan	×	×	×	×	×	12th	16th	×	×	•	15th	20th	TBD
Luxembourg	8th	×	×	×	×	×	×	×	×	×	×	×	×
Macau	×	×	×	×	×	×	×	•	×	•	20th	×	TBD
Malaysia	×	×	×	×	×	×	×	×	×	•	×	21st	TBD
Malawi	×	×	×	×	×	×	×	×	×	•	×	×	•
Mexico	×	×	×	×	×	×	×	×	×	•	×	×	×
Morocco	×	×	×	×	×	×	×	×	×	×	×	••	q
Netherlands	1st	1st	1st	2nd	1st	1st	1st	1st	1st	1st	1st	1st	q
New Zealand	×	×	×	×	×	×	×	•	•	•	18th	16th	TBD
Pakistan	×	×	×	×	×	×	×	×	•	×	×	×	TBD
Papua New Guinea	7th	×	×	×	×	×	×	×	×	×	×	×	×
Philippines	×	×	×	×	×	×	×	×	×	×	•	24th	TBD
Poland	×	×	×	×	×	9th	12th	14th	10th	14th	11th	11th	q
Portugal	×	×	9th	6th	3rd	5th	6th	4th	7th	10th	8th	7th	q
Russia	×	×	×	×	×	×	×	6th	6th	8th	×	×	×
Scotland	×	×	×	×	×	×	×	×	•	•	•	×	•
Serbia	×	×	×	×	×	×	×	×	•	•	•	×	•
Slovakia	×	×	×	×	10th	×	13th	×	•	•	13th	15th	•
South Africa	×	×	×	×	11th	10th	11th	15th	16th	15th	19th	23rd	×
South Korea	×	×	×	×	×	×	×	×	•	•	•	×	TBD
Suriname	×	×	×	×	×	×	×	×	×	×	6th	5th	q
Thailand	×	×	×	×	×	×	×	×	×	×	×	18th	TBD
Turkey	×	×	×	×	×	×	×	×	•	•	×	13th	q
United States	5th	6th	7th	7th	×	×	×	13th	×	×	×	×	×
Wales	×	×	×	×	×	×	×	×	15th	•	•	×	•
Zambia	×	×	×	×	×	×	×	×	×	•	•	×	×
Zimbabwe	×	×	×	×	×	×	×	•	•	•	••	••	q

== See also ==
- Korfball
