= Hong Kong national korfball team =

Hong Kong
- Association: Hong Kong China Korfball Association
- IKF membership: 1988
- IKF code: HKG (Hong Kong)
- IKF rank: 10 (Jan. 2025)

World Championships
- Appearances: 4
- First appearance: 2011
- Best result: 12th, 2015

Asia-Oceania Championship
- Appearances: 10
- First appearance: 1990
- Best result: 3rd, 1990

Asia Championship
- Appearances: 2
- First appearance: 2004
- Best result: 2nd place, 2004
- http://www.korfball.org.hk/new

The Hong Kong national korfball team is managed by the Hong Kong China Korfball Association (HKCKA), representing Hong Kong in Korfball international competitions.

The Hong Kong China Korfball Association (HKCKA) was established in 1999 with its mission of promotion and raising the standard of Korfball in Hong Kong.

Throughout the years, continuing efforts in the promotion and development of korfball for the local community were made with the focus to prepare players and officials to participate and achieve in both local and international korfball competitions.

== Tournament history ==
IKF World Korfball Championship
Year	Championship	Host	Classification
2011	9th World Championship	Shaoxing (China)	14th place
2015	10th World Championship	Belgium	12th place
2019	11th World Championship	Durban (South Africa)	17th place
2023	12th World Championship	Taipei (Taiwan)	14th place

Asia-Oceania Championships
Year	Championship	Host	Classification
1990	1st Asia-Oceania Championship	Jakarta (Indonesia)	3rd place
1992	2nd Asia-Oceania Championship	Delhi (India)	DNP
1994	3rd Asia-Oceania Championship	Adelaide (Australia)	DNP
1998	4th Asia-Oceania Championship	Durban (South Africa)	DNP
2002	5th Asia-Oceania Championship	Delhi (India)	4th place
2006	7th Asia-Oceania Championship	Hong Kong	4th place
2010	8th Asia-Oceania Championship	Zhuzhou (China)	4th place
2014	9th Asia-Oceania Championship	Hong Kong	4th place
2018	10th Asia-Oceania Championship	Saitama (Japan)	4th place
2022	11th Asia-Oceania Championship	Pattaya (Thailand)	7th place

Asia Championships
Year	Championship	Host	Classification
2004	1st Asian Championship	Taiwan	2nd place
2008	2nd Asian Championship	Jaipur (India)	3rd place

== Current squad ==
National team in the 2015 IKF World Korfball Championship

Coach: (Hong Kong) Cheng Wai Ming (鄭偉明)

No.	Player	Gender	DoB/Age	Caps	Club
1	Cheong Chau Yee (張秋儀)	F	27 October 1988 (age 37)		(Hong Kong) MYAA
3	Ng Long Kwan (吳朗崑)	M	13 May 1992 (age 33)		(Hong Kong) Ace
4	Tsang Wing Yan (曾詠茵)	F	11 June 1993 (age 32)		(Hong Kong) Ace
6	Yau Tim Tim (邱甜甜)	F	6 June 1989 (age 36)		(Hong Kong) Massive Dynamic Hamazing
8	Wyinga Ip (葉穎嘉)	F	15 October 1990 (age 35)		(Hong Kong) Dominant
9	Ham Kwok Kuen (譚國權)	M	20 July 1989 (age 36)		(Hong Kong) Massive Dynamic Hamazing
10	Chan Ka Wai (陳嘉慧)	F	27 April 1992 (age 33)		(Hong Kong) MYAA
13	Akiko Tsujikawa (辻川明子)	F	9 January 1989 (age 37)		(Hong Kong) Massive Dynamic Hamazing
14	So Tung Pak (蘇東北)	M	10 August 1995 (age 30)		(Hong Kong) Massive Dynamic Hamazing
15	Chow Ka Hin (周家軒)	M	18 October 1992 (age 33)		(Hong Kong) Dominant
16	Chan Chun Kit (陳駿傑)	M	7 May 1995 (age 30)		(Hong Kong) Dominant
17	Mak Cheuk Hin (麥焯軒)	M	18 November 1995 (age 30)		(Hong Kong) Dominant
18	Lau Ka Hei (劉家希)	F	18 December 1994 (age 31)		(Hong Kong) Dominant
20	Cheung Wing Yan (張永昕)	M	19 August 1995 (age 30)		(Hong Kong) Dominant
21	Luk Tsz Fung (陸子豐)	M	15 February 1992 (age 34)		(Hong Kong) Ace
32	Law Ka Hei (羅嘉曦)	F	1 May 1988 (age 37)		(Hong Kong) MYAA
