= Netherlands national korfball team =

Netherlands
- Association: Koninklijk Nederlands Korfbalverbond
- IKF membership: IKF Founder
- IKF code: NED (Netherlands)
- IKF rank: 1 (Jan. 2025)

World Championships
- Appearances: 12
- First appearance: 1978
- Best result: Champions, 11 times

World Games
- Appearances: 11
- First appearance: 1985
- Best result: Champions, 11 times

European Championships
- Appearances: 9
- First appearance: 1998
- Best result: Champions, 9 times
- http://www.knkv.nl

The Netherlands national korfball team (Dutch: Nederlands korfbalteam) represents the Netherlands in international korfball. It is controlled by the Royal Dutch Korfball Association (KNKV), the governing body of korfball in the Netherlands.

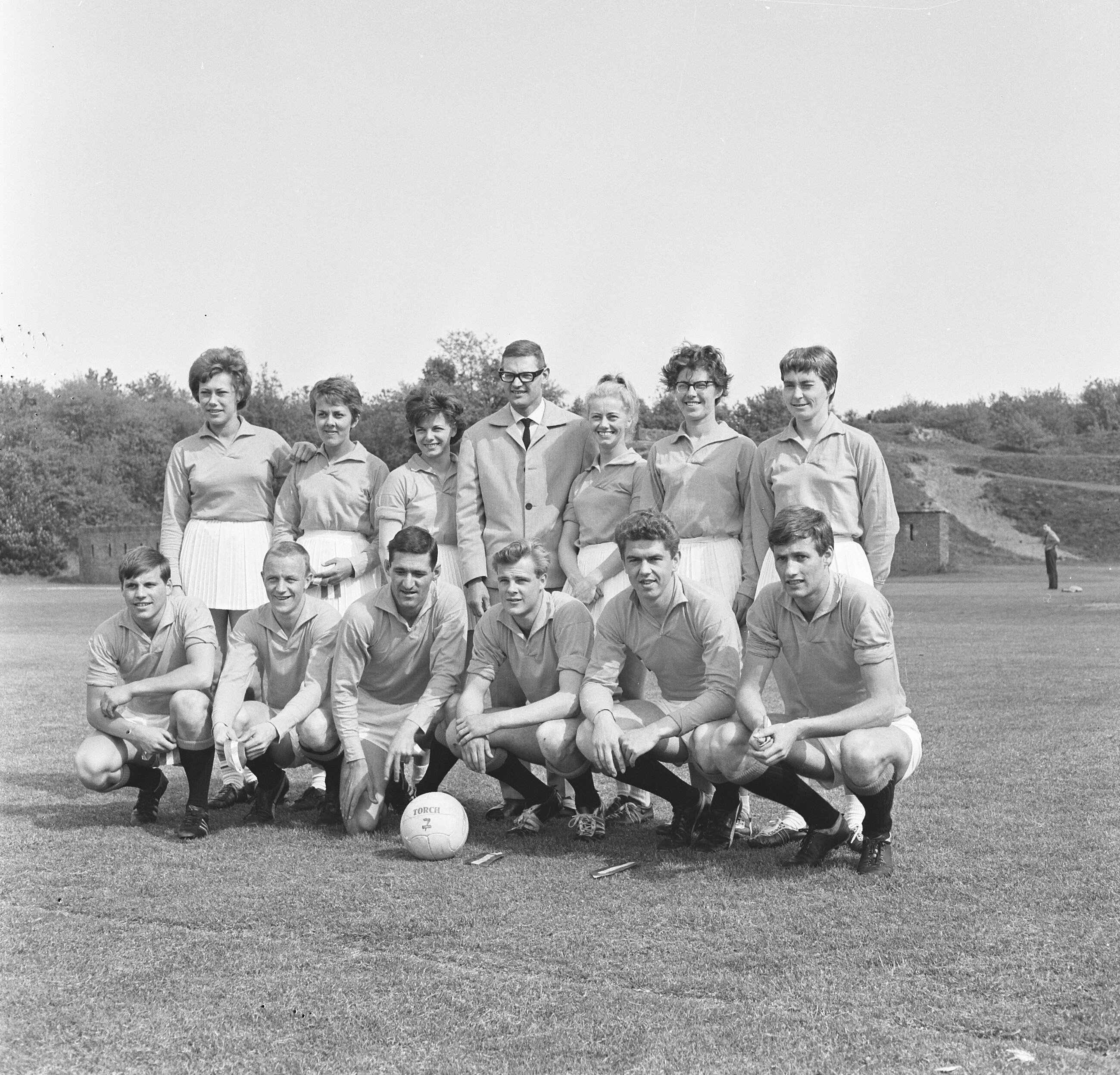
The Dutch team in 1965

They are the most successful national korfball team in the world; having won ten of the eleven World Championships (only non-win came in 1991 when they lost in the final against Belgium), all eight editions of the European Championships and all eleven editions of the World Games.

The last time the Netherlands lost a match, was in January 2004, in a friendly match against Belgium.

== Tournament history ==
World Championships
Year	Championship	Host	Classification
1978	1st World Championship	Amsterdam, Netherlands	Champions
1984	2nd World Championship	Antwerp, Belgium	Champions
1987	3rd World Championship	Makkum, Netherlands	Champions
1991	4th World Championship	Antwerp (Belgium)	2nd place
1995	5th World Championship	New Delhi (India)	Champions
1999	6th World Championship	Adelaide (Australia)	Champions
2003	7th World Championship	Rotterdam (Netherlands)	Champions
2007	8th World Championship	Brno (Czech Republic)	Champions
2011	9th World Championship	Shaoxing (China)	Champions
2015	10th World Championship	Antwerp (Belgium)	Champions
2019	11th World Championship	Durban (South-Africa)	Champions
2023	12th World Championship	Taipei (Taiwan)	Champions

World Games
Year	Championship	Host	Classification
1985	2nd World Games	London (England)	Champions
1989	3rd World Games	Karlsruhe (Germany)	Champions
1993	4th World Games	The Hague (Netherlands)	Champions
1997	5th World Games	Lahti (Finland)	Champions
2001	6th World Games	Akita (Japan)	Champions
2005	7th World Games	Duisburg (Germany)	Champions
2009	8th World Games	Kaohsiung (Taiwan)	Champions
2013	9th World Games	Cali (Colombia)	Champions
2017	10th World Games	Wrocław (Poland)	Champions
2022	11th World Games	Birmingham (United States)	Champions
2025	12th World Games	Chengdu (China)	Champions

European Championships
Year	Championship	Host	Classification
1998	1st European Championship	Portugal	Champions
2002	2nd European Championship	Terrassa (Catalonia)	Champions
2006	3rd European Championship	Budapest (Hungary)	Champions
2010	4th European Championship	Netherlands	Champions
2014	5th European Championship	Maia (Portugal)	Champions
2016	6th European Championship	Dordrecht (Netherlands)	Champions
2018	7th European Championship	Friesland (Netherlands)	Champions
2021	8th European Championship	Antwerp (Belgium)	Champions
2024	9th European Championship	Girona (Catalonia)	Champions

== Current squad ==
Female

- Barbara Brouwer - TOP/SolarCompleet
- Esther Cordus - KZ/Hiltex
- Marloes Frieswijk - Blauw-Wit (C)
- Jet Hendriks - TOP/SolarCompleet
- Fleur Hoek - DVO/Accountor
- Jessica Lokhorst - Fortuna/Delta Logistiek
- Celeste Split - TOP/SolarCompleet
- Marjolijn Schenk - KZ/Hiltex
- Coach: Wim Scholtmeijer

Male

- Laurens Leeuwenhoek - PKC/SWKGroep
- Alwin Out - KZ/Hiltex
- Nick Pikaar- TOP/SolarCompleet
- Daan Preuninger - Fortuna/Delta Logistiek
- Mick Snel TOP/SolarCompleet
- Harjan Visscher - DOS'46
- Olav van Wijngaarden - PKC/SWKGroep
