= Australia national korfball team =

National sports team

Australia
- Association: Korfball Australia (KA)
- IKF membership: 1978
- IKF code: AUS (Australia)
- IKF rank: 10 (Nov. 2025)

World Championships
- Appearances: 11
- First appearance: 1984
- Best result: 4th place, 1995

World Games
- Appearances: 4
- First appearance: 1997
- Best result: 5th, 1997

Asia-Oceania Championship
- Appearances: 11
- First appearance: 1990
- Best result: Champions, 2004
- http://korfball.org.au/

The Australia national korfball team is managed by Korfball Australia (KA), representing Australia in international korfball competitions, including the Asia-Oceania Korfball Championship, the IKF World Korfball Championship and The World Games.

== Tournament history ==
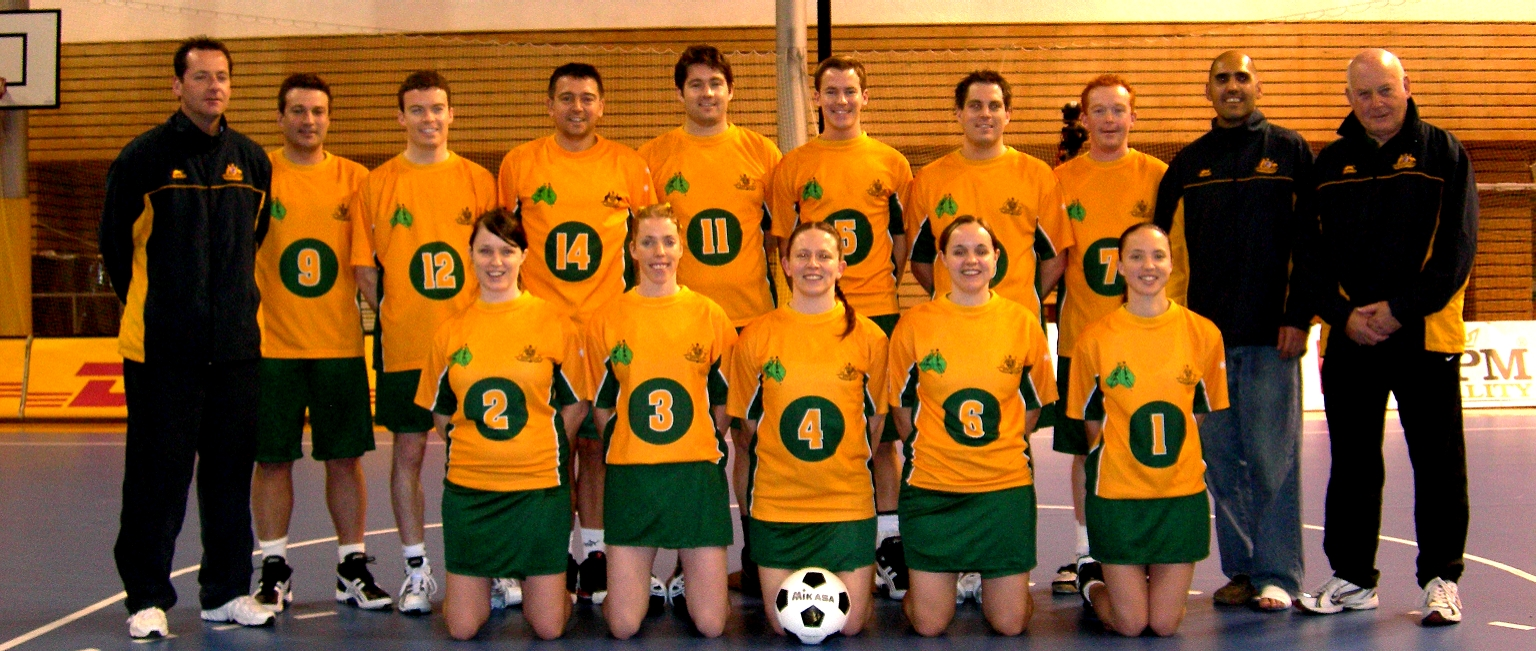
Australian team at the 2007 World Championship

World Championships
Year	Championship	Host	Classification
1984	2nd World Championship	Antwerp (Belgium)	7th place
1987	3rd World Championship	Makkum (The Netherlands)	6th place
1991	4th World Championship	Antwerp (Belgium)	9th place
1995	5th World Championship	New Delhi (India)	4th place
1999	6th World Championship	Adelaide (Australia)	7th place
2003	7th World Championship	Rotterdam (The Netherlands)	7th place
2007	8th World Championship	Brno (Czech Republic)	8th place
2011	9th World Championship	Shaoxing (China)	12th place
2015	10th World Championship	Belgium (various)	11th place
2019	11th World Championship	Durban (South Africa)	14th place
2023	12th World Championship	Taipei (Taiwan)	12th place

World Games
Year	Championship	Host	Classification
1997	5th World Games	Lahti (Finland)	5th place
2001	6th World Games	Akita (Japan)	6th place
2009	8th World Games	Kaohsiung (Taiwan)	8th place
2017	10th World Games	Wrocław (Poland)	6th place

Asia-Oceania Championships
Year	Championship	Host	Classification
1990	1st Asia-Oceania Championship	Jakarta (Indonesia)	2nd place
1992	2nd Asia-Oceania Championship	Delhi (India)	
1994	3rd Asia-Oceania Championship	Adelaide (Australia)	2nd place
1998	4th Asia-Oceania Championship	Durban (South Africa)	
2002	5th Asia-Oceania Championship	Delhi (India)	2nd place
2004	6th Asia-Oceania Championship	Christchurch (New Zealand)	Champions
2006	7th Asia-Oceania Championship	Hong Kong	2nd place
2010	8th Asia-Oceania Championship	China	3rd place
2014	9th Asia-Oceania Championship	Hong Kong	2nd place
2018	10th Asia-Oceania Championship	Saitama, Japan	3rd place
2022	11th Asia-Oceania Championship	Thailand	3rd place

== Current squad ==
National team in the 2018 Asia-Oceania Korfball Championship

- Jessica May
- Bethan Channing
- Grace Cullen
- Emily Hutchesson
- Georgia Bungey
- Joshua Berney
- Joshua Prasad
- Andrew Hutchesson
- Nik Bungey
- Zac Marshall
- Ben Wallace
- Coach: Phil Sibbons
