= 2010 Asia-Oceania Korfball Championship =

Tournament details
- Host country: China
- Dates: 3–8 April
- Teams: 8
- Venue(s): (in 1 host city)

Final positions
- Champions: Chinese Taipei (7th title)
- Runners-up: China
- Third place: Australia
- Fourth place: Hong Kong

Tournament statistics
- Matches played: 20

The 2010 Asia Oceania Korfball Championship was held in Zhuzhou (China) with 8 national teams in competition, from April 3 to 8. It is the eighth edition of the Asia-Oceania Korfball Championship. Chinese Taipei are the defending champions.

== First round ==
=== Group A ===
Pos	Team	Pld	W	OTW	OTL	L	GF	GA	GD	Pts	Qualification
1	Chinese Taipei	3	3	0	0	0	108	47	+61	9	Semi-finals
2	China (H)	3	2	0	0	1	65	45	+20	6	Semi-finals
3	India	3	1	0	0	2	91	60	+31	3	5–8th place
4	Pakistan	3	0	0	0	3	32	144	−112	0	5–8th place

Source: IKF
(H) Host

04/03/10	Chinese Taipei	21-9	China
04/03/10	India	60-1	Pakistan
04/04/10	Chinese Taipei	38-15	India
04/04/10	China	35-8	Pakistan
04/05/10	Chinese Taipei	49-23	Pakistan
04/05/10	China	21-16	India

=== Group B ===
Pos	Team	Pld	W	OTW	OTL	L	GF	GA	GD	Pts	Qualification
1	Hong Kong	3	3	0	0	0	61	36	+25	9	Semi-finals
2	Australia	3	2	0	0	1	75	38	+37	6	Semi-finals
3	New Zealand	3	1	0	0	2	38	49	−11	3	5–8th place
4	South Korea	3	0	0	0	3	20	71	−51	0	5–8th place

Source: IKF

04/03/10	Australia	19-20	Hong Kong
04/03/10	New Zealand	16-7	South Korea
04/04/10	Australia	23-10	New Zealand
04/04/10	Hong Kong	22-5	South Korea
04/05/10	Australia	33-8	South Korea
04/05/10	Hong Kong	19-12	New Zealand

== Final round ==
Semi-finals
April 7
Chinese Taipei	27
Australia	16
April 7
Hong Kong	19
China	24

Final
April 8
Chinese Taipei	27
China	19
Third place
April 8
Australia	24
Hong Kong	19

=== 5–8th place semifinals ===
April 7, 2010
13:30

India	35–6	South Korea
	Report

April 7, 2010
15:00

New Zealand	34–8	Pakistan
	Report

=== Semifinals ===
April 7, 2010
17:00

Chinese Taipei	27–16	Australia
	Report

April 7, 2010
19:00

Hong Kong	19–24	China
	Report

=== Seventh place game ===
April 8, 2010

South Korea	27–10	Pakistan
	Report

=== Fifth place game ===
April 8, 2010
11:30

India	24–10	New Zealand
	Report

=== Third place game ===
April 8, 2010
13:30

Australia	24–19	Hong Kong
	Report

=== Final ===
April 8, 2010
15:30

Chinese Taipei	27–19	China
	Report

== Final standings ==
Final standings
1st place, gold medalist(s)	Chinese Taipei
2nd place, silver medalist(s)	China
3rd place, bronze medalist(s)	Australia
4	Hong Kong
5	India
6	New Zealand
7	South Korea
8	Pakistan

== See also ==
- Asia-Oceania Korfball Championship
