= Japan national korfball team =

National sports team

Japan
- Association: Japan Korfball Association
- IKF membership: 1990
- IKF code: JPN (Japan)
- IKF rank: 21 (Nov. 2025)

World Championships
- Appearances: 4
- First appearance: 1999
- Best result: 12th place, 1999

Asia-Oceania Championship
- Appearances: ?
- First appearance: ?

Asia Championship
- Appearances: 1
- First appearance: 2004
- Best result: 3rd place

The Japan national korfball team is managed by Japan Korfball Association (JKA), representing Japan in korfball international competitions.

== Tournament history ==
World Championships
Year	Championship	Host	Classification
1999	6th World Championship	Adelaide (Australia)	12th place
2003	7th World Championship	Rotterdam (The Netherlands)	16th place
2019	11th World Championship	Durban (South Africa)	15th place
2023	12th World Championship	Taipei (Taiwan)	20th place

Asia-Oceania Championships
Year	Championship	Host	Classification
1992	2nd Asia-Oceania Championship	Delhi (India)	?
1994	3rd Asia-Oceania Championship	Adelaide (Australia)	?
1998	4th Asia-Oceania Championship	Durban (South Africa)	?
2002	5th Asia-Oceania Championship	Delhi (India)	5th place
2014	9th Asia-Oceania Championship	Hong Kong	9th place
2018	10th Asia-Oceania Championship	Saitama (Japan)	5th place
2022	11th Asia-Oceania Championship]]	Thailand	6th place

Asia Championships
Year	Championship	Host	Classification
2004	1st Asian Championship	Taiwan	3rd place
