= Korfball Australia =

Governing body of korfball in Australia

- Sport: Korfball
- Jurisdiction: Australia
- Abbreviation: KA
- Founded: 1978
- Affiliation: International Korfball Federation
- Affiliation date: 1985
- Regional affiliation: Oceania
- Headquarters: Adelaide, South Australia
- President: Roy Kirkby

Official website
- korfball.org.au
- (Australia)

Korfball Australia is the governing body for the sport of Korfball in Australia.

The national body has eight state member associations. Korfball Australia is responsible for organising the various National Teams to compete in international competition, as well as organising the National Club Championships, the peak domestic competition.

== See also ==
Australia national korfball team
