= Philippine Korfball Federation =

Governing body of korfball in the Philippines

- Sport: Korfball
- Abbreviation: PKF
- Founded: 2007
- Affiliation: International Korfball Federation
- Affiliation date: September 13, 2014
- Headquarters: University of Santo Tomas, Manila
- (Philippines)

The Philippine Korfball Federation is the governing body of korfball in the Philippines.

== History ==
The Philippine Korfball Federation was established in 2007 after a delegation from the Institute of Physical Education and Athletics of the University of Santo Tomas attended a korfball seminar workshop in Hong Kong.

The sporting body became the 61st member of the International Korfball Federation on September 13, 2014. The Philippines competed in its first international competition in August 2015 at the International Korfball Federation Asia-Oceania tournament which was held in Taiwan. The tournament was an under-23 tournament.
