= Chinese Taipei national korfball team =

Chinese Taipei (Taiwan)
- Association: Chinese Taipei Korfball Association
- IKF membership: 1985
- IKF code: TPE (Chinese Taipei)
- IKF rank: 3 (Jan. 2025)

World Championships
- Appearances: 10
- First appearance: 1987
- Best result: 2nd place (2023)

World Games
- Appearances: 10
- First appearance: 1989
- Best result: 2nd place (2017)

Asia-Oceania Championship
- Appearances: 11
- First appearance: 1990
- Best result: Champions, 10 times

Asia Championship
- Appearances: 2
- First appearance: 2004
- Best result: Champions, 2 times
- http://www.korfball.url.tw/

The Chinese Taipei national korfball team is managed by the Chinese Taipei Korfball Association (CTKA), representing Taiwan in korfball international competitions.

== Tournament history ==
Overview
Competition	1st place	2nd place	3rd place	4th place
World Championship	0	1	4	2
World Games	0	1	5	3
Asia-Oceania Championship	10	1	0	0

World Championships
Year	Championship	Host	Classification
1987	3rd World Championship	Makkum (The Netherlands)	4th place
1991	4th World Championship	Antwerp (Belgium)	3rd place
1995	5th World Championship	New Delhi (India)	5th place
1999	6th World Championship	Adelaide (Australia)	6th place
2003	7th World Championship	Rotterdam (The Netherlands)	4th place
2007	8th World Championship	Brno (Czech Republic)	5th place
2011	9th World Championship	Shaoxing (China)	3rd place
2015	10th World Championship	Antwerp (Belgium)	3rd place
2019	11th World Championship	Durban (South Africa)	3rd place
2023	12th World Championship	Taipei (Taiwan)	2nd place

World Games
Year	Championship	Host	Classification
1989	3rd World Games	Karlsruhe (Germany)	4th place
1993	4th World Games	The Hague (Netherlands)	4th place
1997	5th World Games	Lahti (Finland)	3rd place
2001	6th World Games	Akita (Japan)	3rd place
2005	7th World Games	Duisburg (Germany)	5th place
2009	8th World Games	Kaohsiung (Taiwan)	3rd place
2013	9th World Games	Cali (Colombia)	3rd place
2017	10th World Games	Wrocław (Poland)	2nd place
2022	11th World Games	Birmingham (USA)	3rd place
2025	12th World Games	Chengdu (China)	3rd place

Asia-Oceania Championships
Year	Championship	Host	Classification
1990	1st Asia-Oceania Championship	Jakarta (Indonesia)	Champions
1992	2nd Asia-Oceania Championship	Delhi (India)	Champions
1994	3rd Asia-Oceania Championship	Adelaide (Australia)	Champions
1998	4th Asia-Oceania Championship	Durban (South Africa)	Champions
2002	5th Asia-Oceania Championship	Delhi (India)	Champions
2004	6th Asia-Oceania Championship	Christchurch (New Zealand)	2nd place
2006	7th Asia-Oceania Championship	Hong Kong	Champions
2010	8th Asia-Oceania Championship	China	Champions
2014	9th Asia-Oceania Championship	Hong Kong	Champions
2018	10th Asia-Oceania Championship	Saitama (Japan)	Champions
2022	11th Asia-Oceania Championship	Thailand	Champions

Asia Championships
Year	Championship	Host	Classification
2004	1st Asian Championship	Taiwan	Champions
2008	2nd Asian Championship	Jaipur (India)	Champions

== Current squad ==
National team in the 2011 World Championship

- Chou-Ying Li
- Pin-Fong CHhen
- Shu-Ping Chu
- Szu-Yu Lin
- Wan-Yao Luo
- Hsiu-Yun Lin
- Ying-Hsuan Huang
- Shih-Jo Kao
- Yu-Liang Pan
- Chun-Hsien Wu
- Kuo-En Chang
- Ling-Fan Huang
- Chia-Hao Kuo
- Chen-Yu Kao
- Chih-Yi Chiu
- Kuan-Ju Hung

National team in the 2007 World Championships

- Hsiang-Ju Chou
- Yen-Yang Chen
- Chou-Ying Li
- Shu-Ping Chu
- Ching-Yi Fan
- Li-Jui Hu
- Hsiu-Yun Lin
- Ying-Chun Chen
- Chun-Hsien Wu
- Chih-Yi Chiu
- Ling-Fan Huang
- Chia-Hao Kuo
- Tsung-Chi Yeh
- Hsiu-Fu Hsu
- Cheng-Hsun Hsieh
- Shih-Chieh Lin
- Coach: Fang-Yi Hsieh
