= Poland national korfball team =

Poland
- Association: Polski Związek Korfballu (PZKorf)
- IKF membership: 1988
- IKF code: POL (Poland)
- IKF rank: 14 (Jan. 2025)

World Championships
- Appearances: 7
- First appearance: 1999
- Best result: 9th place, 1999

World Games
- Appearances: 1
- First appearance: 2017
- Best result: 8th

European Championships
- Appearances: 3
- First appearance: 1998
- Best result: 7th place

European Bowl
- Appearances: 1
- First appearance: 2005
- Best result: 4th place, 2005
- http://www.korfball.pl

The Poland national korfball team (Polish: Reprezentacja Polski w korfballu), is managed by the Polski Związek Korfballu (PZKorf), representing Poland in korfball international competitions.

== Tournament history ==
World Championships
Year	Championship	Host	Classification
1999	6th World Championship	Adelaide, Australia	9th place
2003	7th World Championship	Rotterdam, Netherlands	12th place
2007	8th World Championship	Brno, Czech Republic	14th place
2011	9th World Championship	Shaoxing, China	10th place
2015	10th World Championship	Antwerp (Belgium)	14th place
2019	11th World Championship	Durban (South Africa)	11th place
2023	12th World Championship	Taipei (Taiwan)	11th place

World Games
Year	Championship	Host	Classification
2017	10th World Games	Wrocław, Poland	8th place

European Championships
Year	Championship	Host	Classification
1998	1st European Championship	Portugal	7th place
2002	2nd European Championship	Terrassa, Catalonia, Spain	10th place
2010	4th European Championship	Netherlands	9th place
2014	5th European Championship	Portugal	8th place
2016	6th European Championship	Netherlands	9th place
2018	7th European Championship	Netherlands	9th place
2021	2nd European B-Championship	Poland	1st place
2024	3rd European B-Championship	Turkey	1st place

European Bowl
Year	Championship	Host	Classification
2005	1st European Bowl	Terrassa, Catalonia, Spain	4th place

== Current squad ==
National team at Wroclaw 2021 IKF European Korfball Championship - Division B

- Tamara Siemieniuk
- Paulina Płoszka
- Laura Bijlhouwer
- Natalia Klimczyk
- Martyna Sowińska
- Katarzyna Tomczyk
- Izabela Kołodziejczyk
- Mateusz Spychała
- Marcin Nowak
- Maciej Kołodziejski
- Jędrek Rakowski
- Łukasz Krzemienowski
- Kamil Nowacki
- Jędrek Masztaleruk
- Coach: Maciej Żak
- Assistant Coach: Roelof Koopmans
- Team manager: Dawid Waśniewski

== Former squads ==
National team at 2019 IKF World Korfball Championship

- Tamara Siemieniuk
- Klaudia Majchrzak
- Daria Diadik
- Natalia Klimczyk
- Martyna Sowińska
- Katarzyna Tomczyk
- Izabela Kołodziejczyk
- Łukasz Karpiuk
- Adam Doroszuk
- Krzysztof Rubinkowski
- Kacper Nowak
- Rafał Diadik
- Kamil Nowacki
- Kamil Musialiński
- Coach: Roelof Koopmans
- Assistant Coach: Maciej Żak

National team at 2018 IKF European Korfball A-Championship

- Tamara Siemieniuk
- Klaudia Majchrzak
- Daria Diadik
- Natalia Klimczyk
- Maria Jasińska
- Katarzyna Grdeń
- Izabela Kołodziejczyk
- Mateusz Spychała
- Konrad Popowski
- Krzysztof Rubinkowski
- Kacper Nowak
- Rafał Diadik
- Kamil Nowacki
- Kamil Musialiński
- Coach: Roelof Koopmans
- Assistant Coach: Maciej Żak

National team at 2017 World Games

- Tamara Siemieniuk
- Klaudia Majchrzak
- Daria Diadik
- Katarzyna Pawlak
- Aleksandra Kleinrok
- Paulina Dębicka
- Izabela Kołodziejczyk
- Maciej Żak
- Sebastian Guzina
- Krzysztof Rubinkowski
- Artur Smolarkiewicz
- Rafał Diadik
- Łukasz Karpiuk
- Kamil Musialiński
- Coach: Roelof Koopmans
- Assistant Coach: Maciej Żak

National team at 2016 IKF European Korfball Championship

- Tamara Siemieniuk
- Klaudia Majchrzak
- Daria Diadik
- Katarzyna Pawlak
- Aleksandra Kleinrok
- Paulina Dębicka
- Henrieke Dębski
- Iwona Żak
- Maciej Żak
- Sebastian Guzina
- Krzysztof Rubinkowski
- Artur Smolarkiewicz
- Rafał Diadik
- Łukasz Karpiuk
- Kamil Musialiński
- Szymon Poznański
- Coach: Roelof Koopmans
- Assistant Coach: Maciej Żak

National team at 2015 IKF World Korfball Championship

- Tamara Siemieniuk
- Klaudia Majchrzak
- Henrieke Dębski
- Daria Miszczak
- Paulina Marasek
- Sonia Rubińska
- Kamila Smarzewska
- Maciej Żak
- Krzysztof Rubinkowski
- Kacper Nowak
- Rafał Diadik
- Artur Smolarkiewicz
- Kamil Musialiński
- Coach: Berthold Komduur
- Assistant Coach: Maciej Żak

National team at 2014 IKF European Korfball Championship

- Tamara Siemieniuk
- Henrieke Dębski
- Daria Miszczak
- Katarzyna Pawlak
- Agnieszka Pietrzak
- Ilona Goryszewska
- Klaudia Łojewska
- Łukasz Karpiuk
- Maciej Żak
- Krzysztof Rubinkowski
- Kacper Nowak
- Rafał Diadik
- Marcin Lubański
- Kamil Musialiński
- Coach: Berthold Komduur

National team at 2011 IKF World Korfball Championship

- Katarzyna Pawlak
- Joanna Czyżak
- Anna Kopeć
- Karolina Józefaciuk
- Aleksandra Kleinrok
- Małgorzata Rosińska
- Magdalena Kaczmarek
- Chantal Caljouw
- Maciej Żak
- Krzysztof Rubinkowski
- Marcin Lubański
- Andrzej Plandowski
- Sebastian Guzina
- Łukasz Gawryczuk
- Paweł Sobkowiak
- Adam Doroszuk
- Coach: Andrzej Czyżak

National team at 2010 IKF European Korfball Championship

- Małgorzata Rosińska
- Anna Kopeć
- Karolina Józefaciuk
- Aleksandra Kleinrok
- Dorota Szkalska
- Magdalena Kaczmarek
- Chantal Caljouw
- Maciej Żak
- Krzysztof Rubinkowski
- Marcin Lubański
- Andrzej Plandowski
- Sebastian Guzina
- Andrzej Czyżak
- Thomas Verboven
- Coach: Andrzej Czyżak

National team at 2007 IKF World Korfball Championship

- Magdalena Jaworska
- Karolina Józefaciuk
- Aleksandra Kleinrok
- Joanna Kozanecka
- Katarzyna Pawlak
- Kamila Smarzewska
- Paulina Staszewska
- Emilia Wołyniec
- Andrzej Czyżak
- Artur Dąbrowski
- Sebastian Guzina
- Bartosz Jaszczuk
- Marcin Lubański
- Andrzej Plandowski
- Krzysztof Rubinkowski
- Rafał Sołoducha
- Coach: Andrzej Czyżak
