= Portugal national korfball team =

National sports team

Portugal
- Association: Federação Portuguesa de Corfebol
- IKF membership: 1987
- IKF code: POR (Portugal)
- IKF rank: 7 (Jan.2025)

World Championships
- Appearances: 10
- First appearance: 1987
- Best result: 3rd place, 1995

World Games
- Appearances: 6
- First appearance: 1997
- Best result: 4th place, 2001 & 2013

European Championships
- Appearances: 8
- First appearance: 1998
- Best result: 3rd place, 1998, 2014, 2018

European Bowl
- Appearances: 1
- First appearance: 2005
- Best result: 3rd place, 2005
- http://www.fpcorfebol.pt/

The Portugal national korfball team is managed by the Federação Portuguesa de Corfebol (FPC), representing Portugal in korfball international competitions.

== Tournament history ==
World Championships
Year	Championship	Host	Classification
1987	3rd World Championship	Makkum (The Netherlands)	9th place
1991	4th World Championship	Antwerp (Belgium)	6th place
1995	5th World Championship	New Delhi (India)	3rd place
1999	6th World Championship	Adelaide (Australia)	5th place
2003	7th World Championship	Rotterdam (The Netherlands)	6th place
2007	8th World Championship	Brno (Czech Republic)	4th place
2011	9th World Championship	Shaoxing (China)	7th place
2015	10th World Championship	Antwerp (Belgium)	10th place
2019	11th World Championship	Durban (South Africa)	8th place
2023	12th World Championship	Taipei (Taiwan)	7th place

World Games
Year	Championship	Host	Classification
1997	5th World Games	Lahti (Finland)	6th place
2001	6th World Games	Akita (Japan)	4th place
2009	8th World Games	Kaohsiung (Taiwan)	6th place
2013	9th World Games	Cali (Colombia)	4th place
2022	11th World Games	Birmingham (United States)	7th place
2025	12th World Games	Chengdu (China)	7th place

European Championships
Year	Championship	Host	Classification
1998	1st European Championship	Estoril (Portugal)	3rd place
2002	2nd European Championship	Catalonia	6th place
2010	4th European Championship	Netherlands	7th place
2014	5th European Championship	Maia (Portugal)	3rd place
2016	6th European Championship	Rotterdam (Netherlands)	4th place
2018	7th European Championship	Friesland (Netherlands)	3rd place
2021	8th European Championship	Antwerp (Belgium)	5th place
2024	9th European Championship	Calonge i Sant Antoni (Catalonia)	6th place

European Bowl
Year	Championship	Host	Classification
2005	1st European Bowl	Terrassa (Catalonia)	3rd place

== Current squad ==
National team in the 2019 World Championship

- Isabel Almeida
- Luise Paz Costa
- Catarina Correia
- Ana Cordeiro
- Celise Ribeiro
- Ana Curva
- Jean Ayres
- Bruno Amaral
- Hugo Fernandes
- Júlio Ruivo
- Pedro Correia
- Tiago Luz
- Coach: Isabel Teixeira
- Assistant Coach: Rui Malcata

National team in the 2007 World Championship

- Carla Antunes
- Filipa Santos
- Inês Biocas
- Isabel Almeida
- Joana Faria
- Joana Oliveira
- Sofia Pinhão
- Carlos Faria
- Daniel Serafim
- Henrique Marques
- Luís Simões
- Miguel Costa
- Pedro Vinagre
- Tiago Gonçalves
- Coach: Jorge Ramos
