= Macau national korfball team =

Macau
- IKF code: MAC (Macau)
- IKF rank: 30 (Jul. 2019)

World Championships
- Appearances: 1
- First appearance: 2019
- Best result: 20th

Asia-Oceania Championship
- Appearances: 3
- First appearance: 2006
- Best result: 7th, 2006, 2018

Asia Championship
- Appearances: 1
- First appearance: 2004

The Macau national korfball team represents Macau in international korfball.

== Current squad ==
National team for the 2019 World Championship:

- 1: Choi I Tang
- 3: Weng Si Sio
- 5: Ka U Chao
- 6: Chon Kit Mak
- 8: Hou Kong Leng
- 12: Chi Cheng Au
- 17: Hio Leng Lam
- 19: Meng Heng Wong
- 20: Chi On Ho
- 21: Seng Lam Ao
- 26: Iok Kun Cheang
- 33: Io Kei Chek
- 99: Io Un Lo
- Coach: Atte van Haastrecht
- Manager: Au Chi Cheng
