= Czech Republic national korfball team =

National sports team

Czech Republic
- Association: Český korfbalový svaz (CKS)
- IKF membership: 1989
- IKF code: CZE (Czech Republic)
- IKF rank: 6 (Jan.2025)

World Championships
- Appearances: 6
- First appearance: 1995
- Best result: 3rd place, 2003, 2007

World Games
- Appearances: 5
- First appearance: 2005
- Best result: 3rd place, 2005

European Championships
- Appearances: 7
- First appearance: 1998
- Best result: Runners-up, 2002
- https://www.korfbal.cz

The Czech Republic national korfball team is managed by the Czech Korfball Association (CKA), representing the Czech Republic in korfball international competitions.

== Tournament history ==
World Championships
| Year | Championship | Host | Classification |
| 1995 | 5th World Championship | New Delhi (India) | 7th place |
| 2003 | 7th World Championship | Rotterdam (The Netherlands) | 3rd place |
| 2007 | 8th World Championship | Brno (Czech Republic) | 3rd place |
| 2011 | 9th World Championship | Shaoxing (China) | 8th place |
| 2015 | 10th World Championship | Antwerp (Belgium) | 9th place |
| 2019 | 11th World Championship | Durban (South Africa) | 7th place |
| 2023 | 12th World Championship | Taipei (Taiwan) | 4th place |

World Games
| Year | Championship | Host | Classification |
| 2005 | 7th World Games | Duisburg (Germany) | 3rd place |
| 2009 | 8th World Games | Kaohsiung (Taiwan) | 5th place |
| 2013 | 9th World Games | Cali (Colombia) | 7th place |
| 2022 | 11th World Games | Birmingham (United States) | 7th place |
| 2025 | 12th World Games | Chengdu (China) | 4th place |

European Championships
| Year | Championship | Host | Classification |
| 1998 | 1st European Championship | Portugal | 4th place |
| 2002 | 2nd European Championship | Catalonia | 2nd place |
| 2006 | 3rd European Championship | Budapest (Hungary) | 3rd place |
| 2010 | 4th European Championship | (Netherlands) | 3rd place |
| 2014 | 5th European Championship | Maia (Portugal) | 5th place |
| 2016 | 6th European Championship | Dordrecht (Netherlands) | 7th place |
| 2018 | 7th European Championship | Friesland (Netherlands) | 5th place |
| 2021 | 8th European Championship | Antwerp (Belgium) | 7th place |
| 2024 | 9th European Championship | Girona (Catalonia) | 5th place |

== Current squad ==
National team at 2011 World Championship

- Martina Bouman
- Marie Coufalová
- Martina Jindrová
- Eliska Jonáková
- Lenka Nasadilová
- Tereza Paďouková
- Klara Zábojová
- Jakub Bláha
- Vlastimil Krejčí
- Matej Kubíček
- Petr Malačka
- Jiri Podzemský
- Roman Seifert
- Tomas Sládek

National team in the 2007 World Championship

- Martina Bouman
- Eliška Jonáková
- Eva Kejdušová
- Kateřina Motáková
- Radka Prokůpková
- Petra Škrobová
- Zuzana Spěšná
- Klára Zábojová
- Edwin Bouman
- Jiří Ježek
- Ivo Kracík
- Jan Malačka
- Petr Malačka
- Jiří Podzemský
- Petr Pomahač
- Tomáš Sládek
- Coach: Radek Honzíček
