= China national korfball team =

National sports team

China
- Association: Korfball Promotion Committee of China
- IKF membership: 2006
- IKF code: CHN (China)
- IKF rank: 11 (Jan.2025)

World Championships
- Appearances: 4
- First appearance: 2007
- Best result: 4th place, 2019

World Games
- Appearances: 2
- First appearance: 2017
- Best result: 5th

Asia-Oceania Championship
- Appearances: 5
- First appearance: 2006
- Best result: Runners-up, 2010, 2018, 2022

Asia Championship
- Appearances: 1
- First appearance: 2008
- Best result: 4th place, 2008

The China national korfball team is managed by the Korfball Promotion Committee of China (KCCP), representing China in korfball international competitions.

== Tournament history ==
World Championships
Year	Championship	Host	Classification
2007	8th World Championship	Brno (Czech Republic)	16th place
2011	9th World Championship	Shaoxing (China)	11th place
2015	10th World Championship	Antwerp (Belgium)	7th place
2019	11th World Championship	Durban (South Africa)	4th place

World Games
Year	Championship	Host	Classification
2017	10th World Games	Wrocław (Poland)	5th place
2025	12th World Games	Chengdu (China)	8th place

Asia-Oceania Championships
Year	Championship	Host	Classification
2006	7th Asia-Oceania Championship	Hong Kong	5th place
2010	8th Asia-Oceania Championship	China	2nd place
2014	9th Asia-Oceania Championship	China	3rd place
2018	10th Asia-Oceania Championship	Japan	2nd place
2022	11th Asia-Oceania Championship	Thailand	2nd place

Asia Championships
Year	Championship	Host	Classification
2008	2nd Asian Championship	Jaipur (India)	4th place

== Current squad ==
National team in the 2011 World Championship

- Muzi Li
- Shuofei Shang
- Xi Wang
- Xiaowen Xu
- Xin Zhang
- Yan Zhang
- Jing Zhao
- Manli Zhu
- Feng Jing
- Yi Li
- Shuaishuai Liang
- Xiaoyang Liu
- Yichun Shao
- Jianqing Ou
- Haoran Wang
- Yongbin Yang

National team in the 2007 World Championship

- Cui Qian
- Ding Qian
- Li Jia
- Yang Di
- Zheng Yan
- Zhu Xiaoyu
- Li Chao
- Liu Ge
- Jing Feng
- Ma Ding
- Wang Haoran
- Yuan Lijun
- Coach: Liu Linslieng
