= 2003 Korfball World Championship =

Tournament details
- Host country: Netherlands
- Dates: November 1995
- Teams: 16

Final positions
- Champions: Netherlands (6th title)
- Runners-up: Belgium
- Third place: Czech Republic
- Fourth place: Portugal

The 7th Korfball World Championship was held in the Netherlands on 2003, with the participation of 16 national teams.

== Preliminary round ==
Pool I
Team	Pts	Pld	W	D	L	GF	GA
Great Britain	6	2	2	0	0	36	24
Hungary	3	2	1	0	1	33	30
India	0	2	0	0	2	25	40

Hungary	12–17	Great Britain
Hungary	21–13	India
Great Britain	19–12	India

Pool II
Team	Pts	Pld	W	D	L	GF	GA
Portugal	6	2	2	0	0	42	24
Catalonia	3	2	1	0	1	28	34
South Africa	0	2	0	0	2	25	37

Catalonia	15–14	South Africa
South Africa	11–22	Portugal
Catalonia	13–20	Portugal

== Groups Round ==
Pool A-I
Team	Pts	Pld	W	D	L	GF	GA
Netherlands	9	3	3	0	0	79	22
Chinese Taipei	6	3	2	0	1	39	51
Great Britain	2*	3	1	0	2	35	54
Germany	1*	3	0	0	3	36	62

Germany	16–17*	Great Britain
Netherlands	25–10	Chinese Taipei
Chinese Taipei	16–14	Germany
Great Britain	6–25	Netherlands
Chinese Taipei	13–12	Great Britain
Netherlands	29–6	Germany
		* Golden Goal

Pool A-II
Team	Pts	Pld	W	D	L	GF	GA
Belgium	9	3	3	0	0	69	37
Czech Republic	6	3	2	0	1	50	42
Portugal	3	3	1	0	2	41	52
Australia	0	3	0	0	3	33	62

Czech Republic	21–13	Australia
Belgium	25–15	Portugal
Australia	5–24	Belgium
Portugal	9–12	Czech Republic
Portugal	17–15	Australia
Czech Republic	17–20	Belgium

Pool B-I
Team	Pts	Pld	W	D	L	GF	GA
Hungary	9	3	3	0	0	56	31
South Africa	5*	3	2	0	1	41	42
Slovakia	4*	3	1	0	2	54	41
Japan	0	3	0	0	3	21	58

Japan	5–20	Hungary
Slovakia	15–16*	South Africa
South Africa	11–10	Japan
Hungary	19–12	Slovakia
Japan	6–27	Slovakia
Hungary	17–14	South Africa
		* Golden Goal

Pool B-II
Team	Pts	Pld	W	D	L	GF	GA
Catalonia	9	3	3	0	0	48	29
Poland	6	3	2	0	1	48	34
India	3	3	1	0	2	37	54
Armenia	0	3	0	0	3	33	49

Armenia	14–17	India
Poland	10–14	Catalonia
India	10–23	Poland
Catalonia	17–9	Armenia
Armenia	10–15	Poland
India	10–17	Catalonia

== Final round ==
Finals Pool B
15–16 places
Japan	12–13	Armenia
13–14 places
Slovakia	21*–20	India
11–12 places
South Africa	19–15	Poland
9–10 places
Hungary	13–14*	Catalonia

Semifinals Pool A
5–8 places
Great Britain	15–13	Australia
Germany	12–19	Portugal
1–4 places
Chinese Taipei	10–23	Belgium
Netherlands	23–12	Czech Republic

Finals Pool A
7–8 places
Australia	14–13	Germany
5–6 places
Portugal	17–18	Great Britain
3–4 places
Chinese Taipei	15–21	Czech Republic
FINAL
Netherlands	22–9	Belgium

== Final ranking ==
1. Netherlands
2. Belgium
3. Czech Republic
4. Chinese Taipei
5. Great Britain
6. Portugal
7. Australia
8. Germany
9. Catalonia
10. Hungary
11. South Africa
12. Poland
13. Slovakia
14. India
15. Armenia
16. Japan

== See also ==
- Korfball World Championship
- International Korfball Federation
