= Germany national korfball team =

National sports team

Germany
- Association: Deutscher Turner Bund e.V (DTB)
- IKF membership: 1964
- IKF code: GER (Germany)
- IKF rank: 4 (Jan.2025)

World Championships
- Appearances: 12
- First appearance: 1978
- Best result: 3rd place, 1978, 1984

World Games
- Appearances: 9
- First appearance: 1985
- Best result: 3rd place, 1989, 1993

European Championships
- Appearances: 9
- First appearance: 1998
- Best result: 2nd place, 2018
- http://www.korfball.de/

The Germany national korfball team (German: Deutsche Korfballnationalmannschaft) is managed by the Deutscher Turner Bund e.V (DTB), representing Germany in korfball international competitions.

== Tournament history ==
World Championships
Year	Championship	Host	Classification
1978	1st World Championship	Amsterdam (The Netherlands)	3rd place
1984	2nd World Championship	Antwerp (Belgium)	3rd place
1987	3rd World Championship	Makkum (The Netherlands)	5th place
1991	4th World Championship	Antwerp (Belgium)	4th place
1995	5th World Championship	New Delhi (India)	6th place
1999	6th World Championship	Adelaide (Australia)	4th place
2003	7th World Championship	Rotterdam (The Netherlands)	8th place
2007	8th World Championship	Brno (Czech Republic)	11th place
2011	9th World Championship	Shaoxing (China)	9th place
2015	10th World Championship	Antwerp (Belgium)	6th place
2019	11th World Championship	Durban (South Africa)	5th place
2023	12th World Championship	Taipei (Taiwan)	6th place

World Games
Year	Championship	Host	Classification
1985	2nd World Games	London (England)	4th place
1989	3rd World Games	Karlsruhe (Germany)	3rd place
1993	4th World Games	The Hague (Netherlands)	3rd place
1997	5th World Games	Lahti (Finland)	4th place
2005	7th World Games	Duisburg (Germany)	4th place
2013	9th World Games	Cali (Colombia)	8th place
2017	10th World Games	Wrocław (Poland)	4th place
2022	11th World Games	Birmingham (United States)	4th place
2025	12th World Games	Chengdu (China)	6th place

European Championships
Year	Championship	Host	Classification
1998	1st European Championship	Portugal	6th place
2002	2nd European Championship	Catalonia	4th place
2006	3rd European Championship	Budapest (Hungary)	4th place
2010	4th European Championship	(Netherlands)	4th place
2014	5th European Championship	Maia (Portugal)	10th place
2016	6th European Championship	Dordrecht (Netherlands)	5th place
2018	7nd European Championship	Friesland (Netherlands)	2nd place
2021	8th European Championship	Antwerp (Belgium)	3rd place
2024	9th European Championship	Calonge i Sant Antoni (Catalonia)	3rd place

== Current squad ==
National team at World Games 2013

- Karen Fuchs
- José Geerts
- Katharina Holtkotte
- Tanja Krasemann
- Antje Menzel
- Susanne Peuters
- Anna Schulte
- Dominic Düring
- Henning Eberhardt
- Fabian Kloes
- Hendrik Menker
- Sven Müller
- Fabian Rodenbach
- Martin Schafföner
