= 1999 Korfball World Championship =

2015 IKF World Korfball Championship
Tournament details
- Host country: Australia
- Dates: 30 October – 8 November
- Teams: 16
- Venue(s): 3 (in 3 host cities)

Final positions
- Champions: Netherlands (5th title)
- Runners-up: Belgium
- Third place: Great Britain
- Fourth place: Germany

The 6th Korfball World Championship was held in Adelaide (Australia) in July 1999, with the participation of 12 national teams.

== First round ==
Pool A
Team	Pts	Pld	W	D	L	GF	GA
Netherlands	9	3	3	0	0	102	31
Germany	6	3	2	0	1	70	49
Catalonia	3	3	1	0	2	57	55
Japan	0	3	0	0	3	16	110

Catalonia	31–3	Japan
Netherlands	32–9	Germany
Catalonia	12–24	Germany
Netherlands	42–8	Japan
Germany	37–5	Japan
Catalonia	14–28	Netherlands

Pool B
Team	Pts	Pld	W	D	L	GF	GA
Belgium	9	3	3	0	0	98	34
Great Britain	6	3	2	0	1	56	45
Australia	3	3	1	0	2	52	55
India	0	3	0	0	3	31	103

Great Britain	31–8	India
Australia	13–28	Belgium
Belgium	23–6	Great Britain
Australia	25–8	India
Belgium	47–15	India
Australia	14–19	Great Britain

Pool C
Team	Pts	Pld	W	D	L	GF	GA
Chinese Taipei	9	3	3	0	0	59	44
Portugal	6	3	2	0	1	57	44
Poland	3	3	1	0	2	50	49
South Africa	0	3	0	0	3	37	66

Chinese Taipei	19–17	Portugal
South Africa	14–21	Poland
Poland	13–15	Portugal
Chinese Taipei	20–11	South Africa
South Africa	12–25	Portugal
Chinese Taipei	20–16	Poland

== Final round ==
Quarter finals
Catalonia	6–39	Belgium
Netherlands	31–11	Australia
Chinese Taipei	20–21	Germany
Portugal	14–16	Great Britain
9–12 places
Japan	8–30	Poland
India	13–21	South Africa

Semifinals
1–4 places
Netherlands	35–5	Great Britain
Belgium	23–8	Germany
5–8 places
Australia	18–19*	Portugal
Catalonia	15–25	Chinese Taipei

Finals
11–12 places
Japan	13–33	India
9–10 places
South Africa	14–17	Poland
7–8 places
Catalonia	14–22	Australia
5–6 places
Chinese Taipei	19–20	Portugal
3–4 places
Great Britain	24–22	Germany
FINAL
Netherlands	23–11	Belgium

== Final ranking ==
1. Netherlands
2. Belgium
3. Great Britain
4. Germany
5. Portugal
6. Chinese Taipei
7. Australia
8. Catalonia
9. Poland
10. South Africa
11. India
12. Japan

== See also ==
- Korfball World Championship
- International Korfball Federation
