= Asia-Oceania Korfball Championship =

Korfball competition

- Founded: 1990
- Region: Continental (AOKF)
- Teams: 10 (finals)
- Current champions: Chinese Taipei (10th title)
- Most championships: Chinese Taipei (10 titles)
- 2022 Asia-Oceania Korfball Championship

Asia-Oceania Korfball Championship is the korfball competition played by the Asian and Oceanian national teams, organized by the Asia-Oceania Korfball Federation and the International Korfball Federation.

== Results ==
#	Year	Host	Winners	Score	Runners-up	Third Place	Score	Fourth Place	Number of teams
1	1990; Details	Indonesia	Chinese Taipei	Round-Robin	Australia	Hong Kong	Round-Robin	Indonesia	4
2	1992; Details	India	Chinese Taipei	Round-Robin	Australia	India	N/A	N/A	3
3	1994; Details	Australia	Chinese Taipei	Round-Robin	Australia	Indonesia	Round-Robin	South Africa	4
4	1998; Details	South Africa	Chinese Taipei	Round-Robin	South Africa	India	N/A	N/A	3
5	2002; Details	India	Chinese Taipei	Round-Robin	Australia	India	Round-Robin	Hong Kong	5
6	2004; Details	New Zealand	Australia	17–14	Chinese Taipei	New Zealand	N/A	N/A	3
7	2006; Details	Hong Kong	Chinese Taipei	17–11	Australia	India	14–9	Hong Kong	7
8	2010; Details	China	Chinese Taipei	27–19	China	Australia	24–19	Hong Kong	8
9	2014; Details	Hong Kong	Chinese Taipei	45–27	Australia	China	22–19	Hong Kong	10
10	2018; Details	Japan	Chinese Taipei	22–13	China	Australia	18–17	Hong Kong	10
11	2022; Details	Thailand	Chinese Taipei	29-17	China	Australia	16-11	New Zealand	12
12	2026; Details	Malaysia							

== Medals (1990-2022) ==
Rank	Nation	Gold	Silver	Bronze	Total
1	Chinese Taipei	10	1	0	11
2	Australia	1	6	3	10
3	China	0	3	1	4
4	South Africa	0	1	0	1
5	India	0	0	4	4
6	Hong Kong	0	0	1	1
6	Indonesia	0	0	1	1
6	New Zealand	0	0	1	1
Totals (8 entries)		11	11	11	33

== Ranking ==
=== 1990 ===
Rank	Team	M	W	D	L	GF	GA	GD	Points
1	Chinese Taipei	3	3	0	1	49	27	+22	6
2	Australia	3	2	0	1	28	17	+11	4
3	Hong Kong	3	1	0	2	20	38	-18	2
4	Indonesia	3	0	0	3	24	39	-15	0

=== 1992 ===
Rank	Team	M	W	D	L	GF	GA	GD	Points
1	Chinese Taipei	4	3	0	1	82	54	+28	6
2	Australia	4	3	0	1	60	52	+8	6
3	India	4	0	0	4	48	84	-36	0

=== 1994 ===
Rank	Team	M	W	D	L	GF	GA	GD	Points
1	Chinese Taipei	3	3	0	0	82	31	+51	6
2	Australia	3	2	0	1	58	28	+30	4
3	South Africa	3	1	0	2	33	41	-8	2
4	Indonesia	3	0	0	0	16	89	-73	0

=== 1998 ===
Rank	Team	M	W	D	L	GF	GA	GD	Points
1	Chinese Taipei	6	6	0	0	148	49	+99	12
2	South Africa	6	2	0	4	62	107	-45	4
3	India	6	1	0	5	70	124	-54	2

=== 2002 ===
Rank	Team	M	W	D	L	GF	GA	GD	Points
1	Chinese Taipei	4	4	0	0	89	35	+54	8
2	Australia	4	3	0	1	85	42	+43	6
3	India	4	2	0	2	59	78	-19	4
4	Hong Kong	4	1	0	3	41	76	-35	2
5	Japan	4	0	0	4	30	73	-43	0

=== 2004 ===
Rank	Team	M	W	D	L	GF	GA	GD	Points
1	Australia	4	3	0	1	67	35	+32	6
2	Chinese Taipei	4	3	0	1	64	38	+26	6
3	New Zealand	4	0	0	4	19	77	-58	0

== See also ==
- sk:Majstrovstvá Ázie v korfbale (Asian Korfball Championship)
- nl:Aziatisch-Oceanisch kampioenschap korfbal - Results
