= Belgium national korfball team =

Belgium
- Association: Koninklijke Belgische Korfbalbond
- IKF membership: IKF Foundator
- IKF code: BEL (Belgium)
- IKF rank: 2 (Jan. 2025)

World Championships
- Appearances: 11
- First appearance: 1978
- Best result: Champions, 1991

World Games
- Appearances: 11
- First appearance: 1985
- Best result: Runners-up, 10 times

European Championships
- Appearances: 8
- First appearance: 1998
- Best result: Runners-up, 6 times
- http://www.korfbal.be/

The Belgium national korfball team, nicknamed the Belgian Diamonds, is managed by the Koninklijke Belgische Korfbalbond (KBKB), representing Belgium in korfball international competitions.

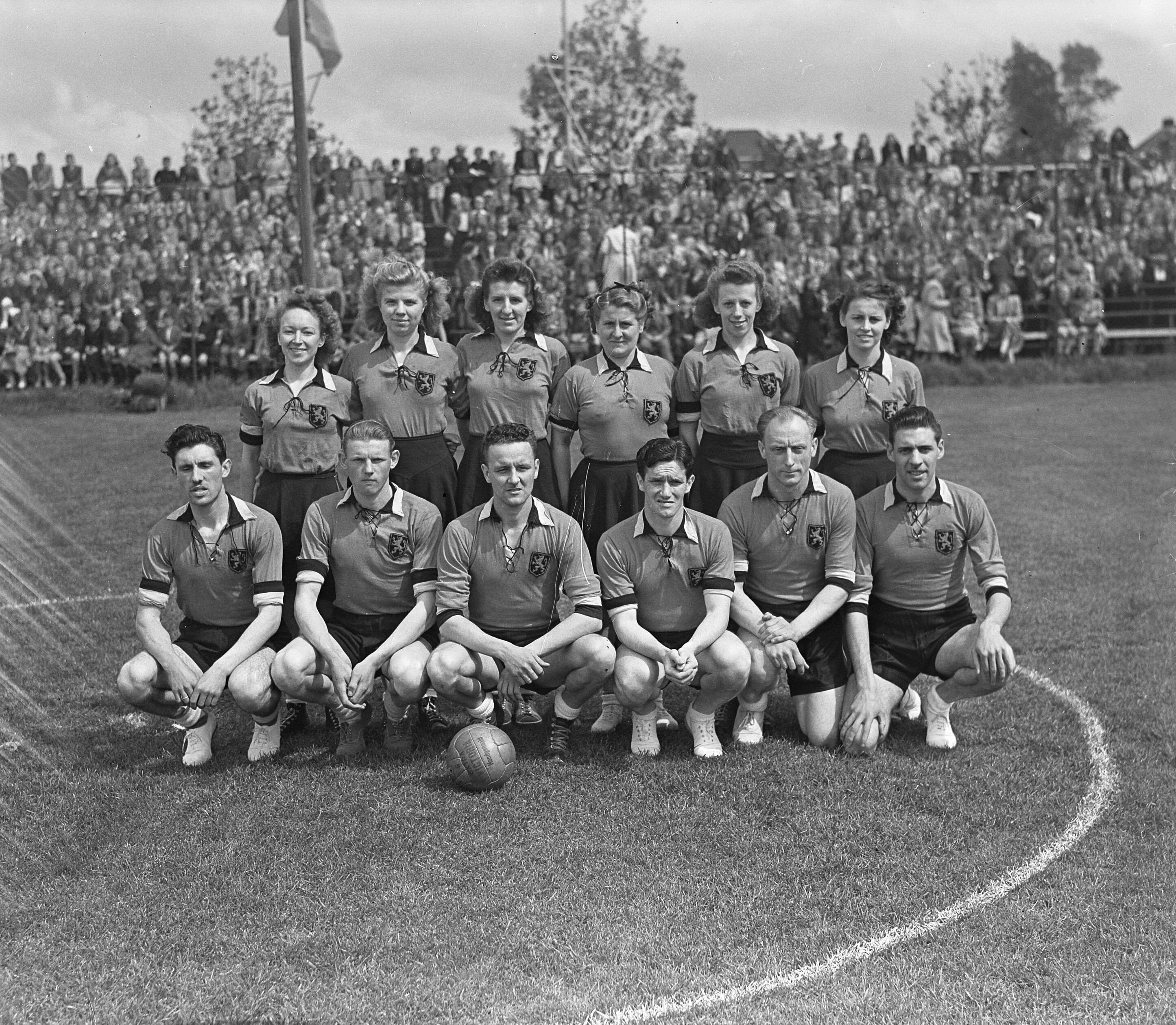
The Belgian team in 1949

The Koninklijke Belgische Korfbalbond was one of the founders of the International Korfball Federation, with the Dutch Federation, on 11 June 1933.

== Tournament history ==
Overview
Competition	1st place	2nd place	3rd place	4th place
World Championship	1	10	1	0
World Games	0	10	1	0
European Championship	0	7	1	1

World Championships
Year	Championship	Host	Classification
1978	1st World Championship	Amsterdam (Netherlands)	2nd place
1984	2nd World Championship	Antwerp (Belgium)	2nd place
1987	3rd World Championship	Makkum (Netherlands)	2nd place
1991	4th World Championship	Antwerp (Belgium)	Champions
1995	5th World Championship	New Delhi (India)	2nd place
1999	6th World Championship	Adelaide (Australia)	2nd place
2003	7th World Championship	Rotterdam (Netherlands)	2nd place
2007	8th World Championship	Brno (Czech Republic)	2nd place
2011	9th World Championship	Shaoxing (China)	2nd place
2015	10th World Championship	Antwerp (Belgium)	2nd place
2019	11th World Championship	Durban (South Africa)	2nd place
2023	12th World Championship	Taipei (Taiwan)	3rd place

World Games
Year	Championship	Host	Classification
1985	2nd World Games	London (United Kingdom)	2nd place
1989	3rd World Games	Karlsruhe (Germany)	2nd place
1993	4th World Games	The Hague (Netherlands)	2nd place
1997	5th World Games	Lahti (Finland)	2nd place
2001	6th World Games	Akita (Japan)	2nd place
2005	7th World Games	Duisburg (Germany)	2nd place
2009	8th World Games	Kaohsiung (Taiwan)	2nd place
2013	9th World Games	Cali (Colombia)	2nd place
2017	10th World Games	Wrocław (Poland)	3rd place
2022	11th World Games	Birmingham (United States)	2nd place
2025	12th World Games	Chengdu (China)	2nd place

European Championships
Year	Championship	Host	Classification
1998	1st European Championship	Estoril (Portugal)	2nd place
2002	2nd European Championship	Terrassa (Spain)	3rd place
2006	3rd European Championship	Budapest (Hungary)	2nd place
2010	4th European Championship	Rotterdam (Netherlands)	2nd place
2014	5th European Championship	Maia (Portugal)	2nd place
2016	6th European Championship	Dordrecht (Netherlands)	2nd place
2018	7th European Championship	Friesland (Netherlands)	4th place
2021	8th European Championship	Antwerp (Belgium)	2nd place
2024	9th European Championship	Calonge (Catalonia)	2nd place
