= New Zealand national korfball team =

National sports team

New Zealand
- Association: Korfball New Zealand (KNZI)
- IKF membership: 1998
- IKF code: NZL (New Zealand)
- IKF rank: 13 (end of 2022)

World Championships
- Appearances: 1
- First appearance: 2019
- Best result: 18th place, 2019

Asia-Oceania Championship
- Appearances: 6
- First appearance: 2004
- Best result: 3rd place, 2004
- http://www.korfball.org.nz/

The New Zealand national korfball team, nicknamed The Korus, is the national team representing New Zealand in korfball international competitions. The team is managed by Korfball New Zealand (KNZI). The name The Korus is one of many national team nicknames (indirectly) related to the All Blacks and/or the New Zealand silver tree fern.

== Tournament history ==
Asia-Oceania Championships
Year	Championship	Host	Classification	Participating Teams
2004	6th Asia-Oceania Championship	Christchurch (New Zealand)	3rd place	3 teams
2006	7th Asia-Oceania Championship	Hong Kong	6th place	7 teams
2010	8th Asia-Oceania Championship	China	6th place	8 teams
2014	9th Asia-Oceania Championship	Hong Kong	6th place	10 teams
2018	10th Asia-Oceania Championship	Japan	6th place	10 teams
2022	11th Asia-Oceania Championship	Thailand	4th place	12 teams

IKF World Championships
Year	Championship	Host	Classification
2019	World Korfball Championships	South Africa	18th place
2023	World Korfball Championships	Chinese Taipei	16th place

== Current squad ==
2023 National team who will participate in the IKF World Korfball Championship, 2023

- Tayla Hardy
- Katelyn Huata-Chapman
- Nicole Lloyd
- Juliet Robertson
- Zara Sadler
- Michelle Tapp
- Kennedy Vallance
- Torsten Ball
- Youri Borrink (Captain)
- Sam Coldicott (G)
- Liam Day
- Tom Donaldson
- Israel Soper
- Per Tonascia
- Coach: Bevan Lawson
- Manager: Simon Cooper

== Youth teams ==
Korfball New Zealand has also sent away multiple youth teams to represent internationally.

U21 (previously U23)
Year	Championship	Host	Classification
2007	U23 Asia-Oceania Youth Championships	Christchurch (New Zealand)	5th place
2011	U23 Asia-Oceania Youth Championships	Australia	6th place
2019	U21 Asia-Oceania Youth Championships	China	5th place
2023	U21 Asia-Oceania Youth Championships	Malaysia	6th place

U19
Year	Championship	Host	Classification
2015	U19 Korfball World Cup	Netherlands	10th place
2018	U19 Open European Korfball Cup	Netherlands	9th place

U17
Year	Championship	Host	Classification
2018	U17 Korfball World Cup	Netherlands	10th place
