= 2015 IKF World Korfball Championship =

Tournament details
- Host country: Belgium
- Dates: 30 October–8 November
- Teams: 16
- Venue(s): 3 (in 3 host cities)

Final positions
- Champions: Netherlands (9th title)
- Runners-up: Belgium
- Third place: Chinese Taipei
- Fourth place: England

Tournament statistics
- Matches played: 56
- Goals scored: 2,605 (46.52 per match)
- Top scorer(s): (Russia) Dmitry Kazachkov (52 goals)

The 10th IKF World Korfball Championship were held in the Belgian cities of Ghent, Tielen and Antwerp in 2015. Ghent and Tielen hosted the first and second round matches, whilst the placing matches and finals were all held in the Lotto Arena in Antwerp.

This tournament also acts as the qualification tournament for Korfball at the World Games 2017. Seven teams will qualify for the World Games, including first all non-European teams finishing in the top 11. As such, at least one and maximum six non-European teams will qualify. Then, the remaining slots will be filled by the top European teams in this competition, with the exception of Poland which have already qualified as host country of the World Games 2017.

The International Korfball Federation chose to award the hosting rights for the tournament to Belgium on 4 November 2011. The other hosting candidate was New Zealand, who planned to host the tournament in Wellington.

== Qualified teams ==
Team	Method of qualification	Finals appearance	Previous appearance	IKF Ranking (Note: The rankings are shown as of November 2014. These are the rankings used for the final draw.)
Australia	2014 Asia-Oceania Korfball Championship runners-up	9th	2011	8
Belgium	Host country	10th	2011	2
Brazil	2014 Pan-American Korfball Championship champions	1st	–	36
Catalonia	2014 IKF European Korfball Championship 9th place	8th	2011	7
China	2014 Asia-Oceania Korfball Championship 3rd place	3rd	2011	10
Chinese Taipei	2014 Asia-Oceania Korfball Championship champions	8th	2011	3
Czech Republic	2014 IKF European Korfball Championship 5th place	5th	2011	6
England	2014 IKF European Korfball Championship 4th place	10th	2011	5
Germany	2014 IKF European Korfball Championship 10th place	10th	2011	9
Hong Kong	2014 Asia-Oceania Korfball Championship 4th place	2nd	2011	12
Hungary	2014 IKF European Korfball Championship 7th place	3rd	2007	14
Netherlands	2014 IKF European Korfball Championship champions	10th	2011	1
Poland	2014 IKF European Korfball Championship 8th place	5th	2011	13
Portugal	2014 IKF European Korfball Championship 3rd place	8th	2011	4
Russia	2014 IKF European Korfball Championship 6th place	3rd	2011	11
South Africa	2014 All-Africa Korfball Championship champions	6th	2011	15

2. includes participations of Great Britain until 2003.
1. includes participations of Germany from 1978 to 1987.

== First round ==
All times listed are Central European Time (UTC+01)

The draw for the first round was made on 7 February 2015 and the matches will be played in Ghent and Tielen.

=== Pool A ===
Pos	Team	Pld	W	OTW	OTL	L	GF	GA	GD	Pts	Qualification
1	Belgium (H)	3	3	0	0	0	160	46	+114	9	Pools for 1st–8th places
2	Russia	3	2	0	0	1	84	87	−3	6	Pools for 1st–8th places
3	Australia	3	1	0	0	2	79	95	−16	3	Pools for 9th–16th places
4	Brazil	3	0	0	0	3	35	130	−95	0	Pools for 9th–16th places

Updated to match(es) played on 1 November 2015. Source: Worldkorfball.org
(H) Host

30 October 2015
14:00

Belgium	51–17	Australia
	Report

Sporthal Bourgoyen, Ghent
Referee: Lee Wing Hung (Hong Kong)

30 October 2015
18:00

Russia	34–12	Brazil
	Report

Sporthal Bourgoyen, Ghent
Referee: Peter Busik (Slovakia)

31 October 2015
14:00

Australia	34–8	Brazil
	Report

Sporthal Bourgoyen, Ghent
Referee: Chen Chi-wei (Chinese Taipei)

31 October 2015
18:00

Belgium	47–14	Russia
	Report

Sporthal Bourgoyen, Ghent
Referee: Jan Henk Hoeksma (Netherlands)

1 November 2015
16:00

Belgium	62–15	Brazil
	Report

Sporthal Bourgoyen, Ghent
Referee: Ronald Buis (Netherlands)

1 November 2015
20:00

Australia	28–36	Russia
	Report

Sporthal Bourgoyen, Ghent
Referee: Dean Woods (England)

=== Pool B ===
Pos	Team	Pld	W	OTW	OTL	L	GF	GA	GD	Pts	Qualification
1	Netherlands	3	3	0	0	0	118	41	+77	9	Pools for 1st–8th places
2	Germany	3	2	0	0	1	57	73	−16	6	Pools for 1st–8th places
3	Czech Republic	3	1	0	0	2	64	81	−17	3	Pools for 9th–16th places
4	Hungary	3	0	0	0	3	43	90	−47	0	Pools for 9th–16th places

Updated to match(es) played on 1 November 2015. Source: Worldkorfball.org

30 October 2015
14:00

Netherlands	41–16	Czech Republic
	Report

Sporthal Tielenhei, Tielen
Referee: Chen Chi-wei (Chinese Taipei)

30 October 2015
18:00

Germany	21–17	Hungary
	Report

Sporthal Tielenhei, Tielen
Referee: Carlos Faria (Portugal)

31 October 2015
14:00

Czech Republic	27–13	Hungary
	Report

Sporthal Tielenhei, Tielen
Referee: Dean Woods (England)

31 October 2015
18:00

Netherlands	35–12	Germany
	Report

Sporthal Tielenhei, Tielen
Referee: Vincent van der Beken (Belgium)

1 November 2015
16:00

Netherlands	42–13	Hungary
	Report

Sporthal Tielenhei, Tielen
Referee: Luke Rosie (Australia)

1 November 2015
20:00

Czech Republic	21–24	Germany
	Report

Sporthal Tielenhei, Tielen
Referee: Lee Wing Hung (Hong Kong)

=== Pool C ===
Pos	Team	Pld	W	OTW	OTL	L	GF	GA	GD	Pts	Qualification
1	Chinese Taipei	3	3	0	0	0	103	45	+58	9	Pools for 1st–8th places
2	Catalonia	3	2	0	0	1	94	55	+39	6	Pools for 1st–8th places
3	Hong Kong	3	1	0	0	2	40	73	−33	3	Pools for 9th–16th places
4	Poland	3	0	0	0	3	47	111	−64	0	Pools for 9th–16th places

Updated to match(es) played on 1 November 2015. Source: Worldkorfball.org

30 October 2015
16:00

Hong Kong	24–18	Poland
	Report

Sporthal Bourgoyen, Ghent
Attendance: Vincent van der Beken (Belgium)

30 October 2015
20:00

Chinese Taipei	32–23	Catalonia
	Report

Sporthal Bourgoyen, Ghent
Referee: Ronald Buis (Netherlands)

31 October 2015
16:00

Catalonia	42–16	Poland
	Report

Sporthal Bourgoyen, Ghent
Referee: Lukas Filip (Czech Republic)

31 October 2015
20:00

Chinese Taipei	26–9	Hong Kong
	Report

Sporthal Bourgoyen, Ghent
Referee: Carlos Faria (Portugal)

1 November 2015
14:00

Chinese Taipei	45–17	Poland
	Report

Sporthal Bourgoyen, Ghent
Referee: Miguel Wensma (Belgium)

1 November 2015
18:00

Catalonia	29–7	Hong Kong
	Report

Sporthal Bourgoyen, Ghent
Referee: Pardeep Dahiya (India)

=== Pool D ===
Pos	Team	Pld	W	OTW	OTL	L	GF	GA	GD	Pts	Qualification
1	England	3	2	1	0	0	76	49	+27	8	Pools for 1st–8th places
2	China	3	2	0	0	1	70	57	+13	6	Pools for 1st–8th places
3	Portugal	3	1	0	1	1	77	53	+24	4	Pools for 9th–16th places
4	South Africa	3	0	0	0	3	39	103	−64	0	Pools for 9th–16th places

Updated to match(es) played on 1 November 2015. Source: Worldkorfball.org

30 October 2015
16:00

China	30–14	South Africa
	Report

Sporthal Tielenhei, Tielen
Referee: Luke Rosie (Australia)

30 October 2015
20:00

Portugal	18–19 (g.g.)	England
	Report

Sporthal Tielenhei, Tielen
Referee: Miguel Wensma (Belgium)

31 October 2015
16:00

Portugal	17–22	China
	Report

Sporthal Tielenhei, Tielen
Referee: Pardeep Dahiya (India)

31 October 2015
20:00

England	31–13	South Africa
	Report

Sporthal Tielenhei, Tielen
Referee: Peter Busik (Slovakia)

1 November 2015
14:00

Portugal	42–12	South Africa
	Report

Sporthal Tielenhei, Tielen
Referee: Jan Henk Hoeksma (Netherlands)

1 November 2015
18:00

England	26–18	China
	Report

Sporthal Tielenhei, Tielen
Referee: Lukas Filip (Czech Republic)

== Second round ==
All times listed are Central European Time (UTC+01)

The top two teams of each group in the first round advanced to the pools for the top 8th places (pools E and F), while the other teams move into pools G and H which will determine positions 9 to 16. In each second round pool the top two will advance to a finals playoff for the top positions, with the bottom two teams dropping into the playoffs for the bottom positions. During the second round, all matches will still be played in Ghent and Tielen, but due to the tournament structure, all teams that played in Ghent in round 1 will now play in Tielen and vice versa.

=== Pools for 1st–8th places ===
==== Pool E ====
Pos	Team	Pld	W	OTW	OTL	L	GF	GA	GD	Pts	Qualification
1	Belgium (H)	3	3	0	0	0	96	46	+50	9	Semifinals
2	Chinese Taipei	3	2	0	0	1	81	65	+16	6	Semifinals
3	Catalonia	3	1	0	0	2	60	78	−18	3	Finals for 5th–8th places
4	Russia	3	0	0	0	3	53	101	−48	0	Finals for 5th–8th places

First match(es) will be played: 3 November 2015. Source: IKF, Worldkorfball.org
(H) Host

3 November 2015
18:00

Russia	17–31	Chinese Taipei
	Report

Sporthal Tielenhei, Tielen

3 November 2015
20:00

Belgium	24–14	Catalonia
	Report

Sporthal Tielenhei, Tielen

4 November 2015
18:00

Russia	22–23	Catalonia
	Report

Sporthal Tielenhei, Tielen

4 November 2015
20:00

Belgium	25–18	Chinese Taipei
	Report

Sporthal Tielenhei, Tielen

==== Pool F ====
Pos	Team	Pld	W	OTW	OTL	L	GF	GA	GD	Pts	Qualification
1	Netherlands	3	3	0	0	0	135	37	+98	9	Semifinals
2	England	3	2	0	0	1	71	78	−7	6	Semifinals
3	Germany	3	0	1	0	2	54	87	−33	2	Finals for 5th–8th places
4	China	3	0	0	1	2	61	119	−58	1	Finals for 5th–8th places

First match(es) will be played: 3 November 2015. Source: IKF, Worldkorfball.org

3 November 2015
18:00

Germany	15–26	England
	Report

Sporthal Bourgoyen, Ghent

3 November 2015
20:00

Netherlands	60–12	China
	Report

Sporthal Bourgoyen, Ghent

4 November 2015
18:00

Germany	27–26 (g.g.)	China
	Report

Sporthal Bourgoyen, Ghent

4 November 2015
20:00

Netherlands	40–13	England
	Report

Sporthal Bourgoyen, Ghent

=== Pools for 9th–16th places ===
==== Pool G ====
Pos	Team	Pld	W	OTW	OTL	L	GF	GA	GD	Pts	Qualification
1	Australia	3	3	0	0	0	90	49	+41	9	Finals for 9th–12th places
2	Hong Kong	3	2	0	0	1	85	61	+24	6	Finals for 9th–12th places
3	Poland	3	1	0	0	2	73	63	+10	3	Finals for 13th–16th places
4	Brazil	3	0	0	0	3	34	109	−75	0	Finals for 13th–16th places

First match(es) will be played: 3 November 2015. Source: IKF, Worldkorfball.org

3 November 2015
14:00

Australia	28–22	Poland
	Report

Sporthal Tielenhei, Tielen

3 November 2015
16:00

Brazil	15–42	Hong Kong
	Report

Sporthal Tielenhei, Tielen

4 November 2015
14:00

Brazil	11–33	Poland
	Report

Sporthal Tielenhei, Tielen

4 November 2015
16:00

Australia	28–19	Hong Kong
	Report

Sporthal Tielenhei, Tielen

==== Pool H ====
Pos	Team	Pld	W	OTW	OTL	L	GF	GA	GD	Pts	Qualification
1	Portugal	3	3	0	0	0	94	40	+54	9	Finals for 9th–12th places
2	Czech Republic	3	2	0	0	1	84	47	+37	6	Finals for 9th–12th places
3	Hungary	3	1	0	0	2	49	68	−19	3	Finals for 13th–16th places
4	South Africa	3	0	0	0	3	35	107	−72	0	Finals for 13th–16th places

First match(es) will be played: 3 November 2015. Source: IKF, Worldkorfball.org

3 November 2015
14:00

Czech Republic	40–10	South Africa
	Report

Sporthal Bourgoyen, Ghent

3 November 2015
16:00

Hungary	11–28	Portugal
	Report

Sporthal Bourgoyen, Ghent

4 November 2015
14:00

Hungary	25–13	South Africa
	Report

Sporthal Bourgoyen, Ghent

4 November 2015
16:00

Czech Republic	17–24	Portugal
	Report

Sporthal Bourgoyen, Ghent

== Finals ==
All times listed are Central European Time (UTC+01)

The top two teams of pools E and F play the championship finals, while the other teams play for placing positions and possible qualification for the Korfball at the World Games 2017 tournament. Note that from this round on, all matches are played in the Lotto Arena in Antwerp.

=== 13th–16th places ===
==== Bracket ====
13th–16th position placing matches
5 November – Antwerp
Poland	25
South Africa	20
5 November – Antwerp
Brazil	9
Hungary	24

13th-14th place match
7 November – Antwerp
Poland	14
Hungary	18
15th-16th place match
7 November – Antwerp
South Africa	22
Brazil	12

==== 13th–16th position placing matches ====
5 November 2015
14:00

Poland	25–20	South Africa
	Report

Lotto Arena, Antwerp

5 November 2015
16:00

Brazil	9–24	Hungary
	Report

Lotto Arena, Antwerp

==== 15th–16th place match ====
7 November 2015
14:00

South Africa	22–12	Brazil
	Report

Lotto Arena, Antwerp

==== 13th–14th place match ====
7 November 2015
16:00

Poland	14–18	Hungary
	Report

Lotto Arena, Antwerp

=== 9th–12th places ===
==== Bracket ====
9th–12th position placing matches
5 November – Antwerp
Australia	16
Czech Republic	17
5 November – Antwerp
Hong Kong	6
Portugal	27

9th-10th place match
7 November – Antwerp
Czech Republic	20
Portugal	19
11th-12th place match
7 November – Antwerp
Australia	23
Hong Kong	9

==== 9th–12th position placing matches ====
5 November 2015
18:00

Australia	16–17 (g.g.)	Czech Republic
	Report

Lotto Arena, Antwerp

5 November 2015
20:00

Hong Kong	6–27	Portugal
	Report

Lotto Arena, Antwerp

==== 11th–12th place match ====
7 November 2015
18:00

Australia	23–9	Hong Kong
	Report

Lotto Arena, Antwerp

==== 9th–10th place match ====
7 November 2015
20:00

Czech Republic	20–19	Portugal
	Report

Lotto Arena, Antwerp

=== 5th–8th places ===
==== Bracket ====
5th–8th position placing matches
6 November – Antwerp
Russia	17
Germany	24
6 November – Antwerp
Catalonia	32
China	23

5th-6th place match
8 November – Antwerp
Germany	15
Catalonia	16
7th-8th place match
8 November – Antwerp
Russia	30
China	41

==== 5th–8th position placing matches ====
6 November 2015
14:00

Russia	17–24	Germany
	Report

Lotto Arena, Antwerp

6 November 2015
16:00

Catalonia	32–23	China
	Report

Lotto Arena, Antwerp

==== 7th–8th place match ====
8 November 2015
9:30

Russia	30–41	China
	Report

Lotto Arena, Antwerp

==== 5th–6th place match ====
8 November 2015
11:30

Germany	15–16 (g.g.)	Catalonia
	Report

Lotto Arena, Antwerp

=== Championship semifinals ===
==== Bracket ====
Semi-finals
6 November – Antwerp
Chinese Taipei	17
Netherlands	40
6 November – Antwerp
Belgium	30
England	14

Final
8 November – Antwerp
Netherlands	27
Belgium	18
Third place
8 November – Antwerp
Chinese Taipei	21
England	12

==== Semifinals ====
6 November 2015
18:00

Chinese Taipei	17–40	Netherlands
	Report

Lotto Arena, Antwerp

6 November 2015
20:00

Belgium	30–14	England
	Report

Lotto Arena, Antwerp

==== 3rd–4th place match ====
8 November 2015
13:30

Chinese Taipei	21–12	England
	Report

Lotto Arena, Antwerp

==== Final ====
8 November 2015
15:30

Netherlands	27–18	Belgium
	Report

Lotto Arena, Antwerp

== Statistics ==
=== New record ===
- Jesse de Bremaeker of Belgium scored 14 goals against Russia on 31 October 2015, tying the record for most goals by a single player in a match during the IKF World Korfball Championship, early set by Barry Schep.
- Belgium won against Brazil by 62–15 on 1 November 2015, which is the new world record for most total goals in one match and most goals by a single team in one match in IKF World Korfball Championship. The previous record was set during the 2011 IKF World Korfball Championship, when Netherlands beat India by 61–11.

== Final standings ==
Key
Qualified for the 2017 World Games as non-European team in top-11
Qualified for the 2017 World Games as best European team (remaining four places)
Qualified for the 2017 World Games as hosts (already pre-tournament)

Rank	Team
1st place, gold medalist(s)	Netherlands
2nd place, silver medalist(s)	Belgium
3rd place, bronze medalist(s)	Chinese Taipei
4	England
5	Catalonia
6	Germany
7	China
8	Russia
9	Czech Republic
10	Portugal
11	Australia
12	Hong Kong
13	Hungary
14	Poland
15	South Africa
16	Brazil

== See also ==
- Korfball World Championship
- International Korfball Federation
