= 2026 IKF European Korfball Championship =

Tournament details
- Host country: Czech Republic
- Cities: Prostějov, Otrokovice, Zlín
- Dates: 16–24 October 2026
- Teams: 16

Final positions
- Champions: Netherlands
- Runners-up: Belgium
- Third place: Czech Republic
- Fourth place: Germany

Tournament statistics
- Matches played: 56
- Goals scored: 1,806 (32.25 per match)

The 2026 IKF European Korfball Championship was held in the Czech Republic from 16 to 24 October 2026, organised by the Czech Korfball Association. Group stage matches were played in Prostějov and Otrokovice (group phase), while the final matches were held in Zlín. It was the first European Korfball Championship to feature 16 teams again since 2014, after the 2018, 2021 and 2024 editions were played with only eight teams.

The tournament also served as the European qualifier for the 2027 IKF World Korfball Championship, with the nations in the top ten directly qualified. As host, the Netherlands were automatically qualified. Netherlands were the defending champions, having won the 2024 edition, and successfully defended their title, beating Belgium in the final.

== Draw ==
The group draw took place on 13 April 2026. The four highest-ranked teams in the IKF World Rankings (the Netherlands, Belgium, Germany and the Czech Republic) were seeded into Groups A–D.

| Group A | Group B | Group C | Group D |
|---|---|---|---|
| Netherlands | Belgium | Germany | Czech Republic |
| Catalonia | Portugal | Turkey | England |
| Poland | Hungary | Slovakia | Wales |
| Switzerland | Scotland | Serbia | Ireland |

== Format ==
The tournament was played in three stages, similar to the 2010 championship:

- First stage: four groups of four teams play a single round-robin.
- Second stage: the top two teams of Groups A and D form Group E, and the top two of Groups B and C form Group F. The bottom two teams of Groups A and D form Group G, and the bottom two of Groups B and C form Group H. Results between teams that already met in the first stage are carried forward.
- Final stage: the teams of Groups E and F play for places 1–8 and the teams of Groups G and H for places 9–16, in crossover matches between the two groups of each pair. The top two of Groups E and F play the semi-finals, the third- and fourth-placed teams play for places 5 to 8, the top two of Groups G and H play for places 9 to 12, and the bottom two for places 13 to 16.

A win earns three points, a golden goal win (after a tied score at full time) two points, a golden goal loss one point, and an outright loss none.

== Venues ==
| City | Hall | Matches |
|---|---|---|
| Prostějov | | Group phase |
| Otrokovice | | Group phase |
| Zlín | | Final matches |

== First stage ==
All times are local (CEST).

=== Group A ===
| Pos | Team | Pld | W | OTW | OTL | L | GF | GA | GD | Pts |
|---|---|---|---|---|---|---|---|---|---|---|
| 1 | Netherlands | 3 | 3 | 0 | 0 | 0 | 131 | 18 | +113 | 9 |
| 2 | Catalonia | 3 | 2 | 0 | 0 | 1 | 50 | 68 | −18 | 6 |
| 3 | Poland | 3 | 1 | 0 | 0 | 2 | 36 | 69 | −33 | 3 |
| 4 | Switzerland | 3 | 0 | 0 | 0 | 3 | 28 | 90 | −62 | 0 |

Source: World Korfball
Green: advance to Group E; no shading: advance to Group G.

16 October 2026

| Catalonia | 26–9 | Switzerland |
|---|---|---|
| | Report |

16 October 2026

| Netherlands | 37–7 | Poland |
|---|---|---|
| | Report |

17 October 2026

| Poland | 18–11 | Switzerland |
|---|---|---|
| | Report |

17 October 2026

| Netherlands | 48–3 | Catalonia |
|---|---|---|
| | Report |

18 October 2026

| Catalonia | 21–11 | Poland |
|---|---|---|
| | Report |

18 October 2026

| Switzerland | 8–46 | Netherlands |
|---|---|---|
| | Report |

=== Group B ===
| Pos | Team | Pld | W | OTW | OTL | L | GF | GA | GD | Pts |
|---|---|---|---|---|---|---|---|---|---|---|
| 1 | Belgium | 3 | 3 | 0 | 0 | 0 | 90 | 27 | +63 | 9 |
| 2 | Portugal | 3 | 2 | 0 | 0 | 1 | 59 | 44 | +15 | 6 |
| 3 | Hungary | 3 | 1 | 0 | 0 | 2 | 32 | 57 | −25 | 3 |
| 4 | Scotland | 3 | 0 | 0 | 0 | 3 | 23 | 76 | −53 | 0 |

Source: World Korfball
Green: advance to Group F; no shading: advance to Group H.

16 October 2026

| Portugal | 24–8 | Scotland |
|---|---|---|
| | Report |

16 October 2026

| Belgium | 26–8 | Hungary |
|---|---|---|
| | Report |

17 October 2026

| Hungary | 17–6 | Scotland |
|---|---|---|
| | Report |

17 October 2026

| Belgium | 29–10 | Portugal |
|---|---|---|
| | Report |

18 October 2026

| Portugal | 25–7 | Hungary |
|---|---|---|
| | Report |

18 October 2026

| Scotland | 9–35 | Belgium |
|---|---|---|
| | Report |

=== Group C ===
| Pos | Team | Pld | W | OTW | OTL | L | GF | GA | GD | Pts |
|---|---|---|---|---|---|---|---|---|---|---|
| 1 | Germany | 3 | 3 | 0 | 0 | 0 | 77 | 31 | +46 | 9 |
| 2 | Turkey | 3 | 2 | 0 | 0 | 1 | 53 | 48 | +5 | 6 |
| 3 | Slovakia | 3 | 1 | 0 | 0 | 2 | 39 | 62 | −23 | 3 |
| 4 | Serbia | 3 | 0 | 0 | 0 | 3 | 39 | 67 | −28 | 0 |

Source: World Korfball
Green: advance to Group F; no shading: advance to Group H.

16 October 2026

| Turkey | 23–14 | Serbia |
|---|---|---|
| | Report |

16 October 2026

| Germany | 30–8 | Slovakia |
|---|---|---|
| | Report |

17 October 2026

| Slovakia | 19–17 | Serbia |
|---|---|---|
| | Report |

17 October 2026

| Germany | 22–15 | Turkey |
|---|---|---|
| | Report |

18 October 2026

| Turkey | 15–12 | Slovakia |
|---|---|---|
| | Report |

18 October 2026

| Serbia | 8–25 | Germany |
|---|---|---|
| | Report |

=== Group D ===
| Pos | Team | Pld | W | OTW | OTL | L | GF | GA | GD | Pts |
|---|---|---|---|---|---|---|---|---|---|---|
| 1 | Czech Republic | 3 | 3 | 0 | 0 | 0 | 66 | 26 | +40 | 9 |
| 2 | England | 3 | 2 | 0 | 0 | 1 | 66 | 30 | +36 | 6 |
| 3 | Wales | 3 | 1 | 0 | 0 | 2 | 26 | 58 | −32 | 3 |
| 4 | Ireland | 3 | 0 | 0 | 0 | 3 | 23 | 67 | −44 | 0 |

Source: World Korfball
Green: advance to Group E; no shading: advance to Group G.

16 October 2026

| Czech Republic | 32–8 | Ireland |
|---|---|---|
| | Report |

16 October 2026

| England | 32–7 | Wales |
|---|---|---|
| | Report |

17 October 2026

| Ireland | 10–18 | Wales |
|---|---|---|
| | Report |

17 October 2026

| Czech Republic | 18–17 | England |
|---|---|---|
| | Report |

18 October 2026

| Czech Republic | 16–1 | Wales |
|---|---|---|
| | Report |

18 October 2026

| England | 17–5 | Ireland |
|---|---|---|
| | Report |

== Second stage ==
Results between teams from the same first-stage group are carried forward and included in the tables below (Group E: Netherlands 48–3 Catalonia and Czech Republic 18–17 England; Group F: Belgium 29–10 Portugal and Germany 22–15 Turkey; Group G: Poland 18–11 Switzerland and Wales 18–10 Ireland; Group H: Hungary 17–6 Scotland and Slovakia 19–17 Serbia).

=== Group E ===
| Pos | Team | Pld | W | OTW | OTL | L | GF | GA | GD | Pts |
|---|---|---|---|---|---|---|---|---|---|---|
| 1 | Netherlands | 3 | 3 | 0 | 0 | 0 | 121 | 18 | +103 | 9 |
| 2 | Czech Republic | 3 | 2 | 0 | 0 | 1 | 51 | 68 | −17 | 6 |
| 3 | England | 3 | 1 | 0 | 0 | 2 | 41 | 68 | −27 | 3 |
| 4 | Catalonia | 3 | 0 | 0 | 0 | 3 | 31 | 90 | −59 | 0 |

Source: World Korfball
Green: advance to the semi-finals; yellow: advance to the 5th–8th place classification.

20 October 2026

| Czech Republic | 27–15 | Catalonia |
|---|---|---|
| | Report |

20 October 2026

| Netherlands | 37–9 | England |
|---|---|---|
| | Report |

21 October 2026

| Czech Republic | 6–36 | Netherlands |
|---|---|---|
| | Report |

21 October 2026

| Catalonia | 13–15 | England |
|---|---|---|
| | Report |

=== Group F ===
| Pos | Team | Pld | W | OTW | OTL | L | GF | GA | GD | Pts |
|---|---|---|---|---|---|---|---|---|---|---|
| 1 | Belgium | 3 | 3 | 0 | 0 | 0 | 90 | 29 | +61 | 9 |
| 2 | Germany | 3 | 2 | 0 | 0 | 1 | 53 | 58 | −5 | 6 |
| 3 | Turkey | 3 | 1 | 0 | 0 | 2 | 36 | 70 | −34 | 3 |
| 4 | Portugal | 3 | 0 | 0 | 0 | 3 | 40 | 62 | −22 | 0 |

Source: World Korfball
Green: advance to the semi-finals; yellow: advance to the 5th–8th place classification.

20 October 2026

| Belgium | 35–6 | Turkey |
|---|---|---|
| | Report |

20 October 2026

| Germany | 18–17 | Portugal |
|---|---|---|
| | Report |

21 October 2026

| Belgium | 26–13 | Germany |
|---|---|---|
| | Report |

21 October 2026

| Portugal | 13–15 | Turkey |
|---|---|---|
| | Report |

=== Group G ===
| Pos | Team | Pld | W | OTW | OTL | L | GF | GA | GD | Pts |
|---|---|---|---|---|---|---|---|---|---|---|
| 1 | Poland | 3 | 3 | 0 | 0 | 0 | 47 | 21 | +26 | 9 |
| 2 | Wales | 3 | 2 | 0 | 0 | 1 | 41 | 37 | +4 | 6 |
| 3 | Ireland | 3 | 1 | 0 | 0 | 2 | 25 | 44 | −19 | 3 |
| 4 | Switzerland | 3 | 0 | 0 | 0 | 3 | 35 | 46 | −11 | 0 |

Source: World Korfball
Blue: advance to the 9th–12th place classification; grey: advance to the 13th–16th place classification.

20 October 2026

| Poland | 14–2 | Ireland |
|---|---|---|
| | Report |

20 October 2026

| Wales | 15–12 | Switzerland |
|---|---|---|
| | Report |

21 October 2026

| Poland | 15–8 | Wales |
|---|---|---|
| | Report |

21 October 2026

| Switzerland | 12–13 | Ireland |
|---|---|---|
| | Report |

=== Group H ===
| Pos | Team | Pld | W | OTW | OTL | L | GF | GA | GD | Pts |
|---|---|---|---|---|---|---|---|---|---|---|
| 1 | Hungary | 3 | 3 | 0 | 0 | 0 | 53 | 27 | +26 | 9 |
| 2 | Slovakia | 3 | 2 | 0 | 0 | 1 | 41 | 42 | −1 | 6 |
| 3 | Serbia | 3 | 0 | 1 | 0 | 2 | 43 | 51 | −8 | 2 |
| 4 | Scotland | 3 | 0 | 0 | 1 | 2 | 27 | 44 | −17 | 1 |

Source: World Korfball
Blue: advance to the 9th–12th place classification; grey: advance to the 13th–16th place classification.

20 October 2026

| Hungary | 18–11 | Serbia |
|---|---|---|
| | Report |

20 October 2026

| Slovakia | 12–7 | Scotland |
|---|---|---|
| | Report |

21 October 2026

| Hungary | 18–10 | Slovakia |
|---|---|---|
| | Report |

21 October 2026

| Scotland | 14–15 GG | Serbia |
|---|---|---|
| | Report |

== Final stage ==
=== 13th–16th place ===
==== Crossover ====
22 October 2026
09:30

| Ireland | 13–10 | Scotland |
|---|---|---|
| | Report |

22 October 2026
11:05

| Serbia | 13–11 | Switzerland |
|---|---|---|
| | Report |

==== 15th place ====
23 October 2026
14:00

| Scotland | 13–11 | Switzerland |
|---|---|---|
| | Report |

==== 13th place ====
23 October 2026
15:45

| Ireland | 8–11 | Serbia |
|---|---|---|
| | Report |

=== 9th–12th place ===
==== Crossover ====
22 October 2026
12:40

| Poland | 15–11 | Slovakia |
|---|---|---|
| | Report |

22 October 2026
14:15

| Hungary | 17–10 | Wales |
|---|---|---|
| | Report |

==== 11th place ====
23 October 2026
17:30

| Slovakia | GG 13–12 | Wales |
|---|---|---|
| | Report |

==== 9th place ====
23 October 2026
19:15

| Poland | 12–9 | Hungary |
|---|---|---|
| | Report |

=== 5th–8th place ===
==== Crossover ====
22 October 2026
15:50

| England | 20–8 | Portugal |
|---|---|---|
| | Report |

22 October 2026
17:25

| Turkey | 14–16 | Catalonia |
|---|---|---|
| | Report |

==== 7th place ====
24 October 2026
10:00

| Portugal | 24–17 | Turkey |
|---|---|---|
| | Report |

==== 5th place ====
24 October 2026
11:45

| England | 15–11 | Catalonia |
|---|---|---|
| | Report |

=== Semi-finals ===
22 October 2026
19:00

| Netherlands | 35–11 | Germany |
|---|---|---|
| | Report |

22 October 2026
20:35

| Belgium | 26–14 | Czech Republic |
|---|---|---|
| | Report |

=== Bronze final ===
24 October 2026
13:30

| Germany | 12–20 | Czech Republic |
|---|---|---|
| | Report |

=== Final ===
24 October 2026
15:15

| Netherlands | 27–12 | Belgium |
|---|---|---|
| | Report |

== Final standings ==
| Rank | Team |
|---|---|
| 1st place, gold medalist(s) | Netherlands |
| 2nd place, silver medalist(s) | Belgium |
| 3rd place, bronze medalist(s) | Czech Republic |
| 4 | Germany |
| 5 | England |
| 6 | Catalonia |
| 7 | Portugal |
| 8 | Turkey |
| 9 | Poland |
| 10 | Hungary |
| 11 | Slovakia |
| 12 | Wales |
| 13 | Serbia |
| 14 | Ireland |
| 15 | Scotland |
| 16 | Switzerland |
