= European Korfball B-Championship =

European Korfball B-Championship is a second level korfball competition for European national teams organized by the International Korfball Federation and is placed below the European Korfball A-Championship.

== History ==
The tournament features the nations that have not qualified for the European Korfball A-Championship and a promotion/relegation system will be put into place between both championships, with the winner of the B-Championships promoting to the A-Championships, although the exact manner is yet to be defined. The tournament can be seen as the successor of the defunct Korfball European Bowl, although that tournament served as a qualifier for both European Korfball Championship and the Korfball World Championship. The B-Championships are held every two years, always in the same year as the A-Championship. The first edition was hosted by the Netherlands in 2018.

== Results ==
European Korfball B-Championship
	Year	Host	Final			Third place match			#Number of teams
	Year	Host	Champion	Score	Second place	Third place	Score	Fourth place	#Number of teams
I	2018	Netherlands	Poland	21-7	Ireland	Slovakia	18–15	Wales	7
II	2021	Poland	Poland	18-15	Slovakia	Turkey	17-9	Scotland	8
III	2024	Turkey	Poland	14-9	Turkey	Wales	12(gg)-11	Slovakia	8

== Debut of teams ==
Year	Debutants	Total
2018	France; Hungary; Ireland; Poland; Scotland; Serbia; Slovakia; Wales	8
2020	Greece; Switzerland; Turkey	3
2024		0
Total		11

1. In 2018, the tournament was played at the same time and place as the A-Championship. After the group stage of both tournaments, an intermediate stage was held in which the bottom two teams from the A-Championship faced off against the top two teams of the B-Championship, with the winners continuing at the A-level and the losers at the B-level. Poland initially started in the A-Championship but lost its match against Hungary, and was therefore relegated, continuing to play the remainder of the tournament as part of the B-Championship, which is counted as their debut at this level. The same goes for Hungary, which started at the B-Championship but ended the tournament in the A-Championship.

== Medals summary ==
Rank	Nation	Gold	Silver	Bronze	Total
1	Poland	3	0	0	3
2	Slovakia	0	1	1	2
2	Turkey	0	1	1	2
4	Ireland	0	1	0	1
5	Wales	0	0	1	1
Totals (5 entries)		3	3	3	9

== See also ==
- International Korfball Federation
- European Korfball A-Championship
- Korfball European Bowl
