= 2018 IKF European Korfball B-Championship =

2018 European Korfball B-Championship
Tournament details
- Host country: Netherlands
- City: Drachten, Gorredijk, Heerenveen and Leeuwarden
- Dates: 13 to 21 October 2018
- Teams: 7
- Venue(s): 4

Final positions
- Champions: Poland (1st title)
- Runners-up: Ireland
- Third place: Slovakia
- Fourth place: Wales

The 2018 European Korfball B-Championship was held in the Netherlands from 13 to 21 October 2018. Matches were played in Drachten, Gorredijk, Heerenveen and Leeuwarden. It was the first edition where the European Korfball Championship was split into an A-Championship and a B-Championship, with the idea that a certain number of teams will relegate from the A-Championship to the B-Championship after each edition, and a certain number of teams from the B-Championship will be promoted. Whether this will be a direct promotion or relegation, or whether play-offs will need to be played, is yet to be determined. The tournament was originally scheduled to be played by eight teams, but following a late withdrawal by Turkey, only seven teams took part.

The top two finishers qualified for the 2019 IKF World Korfball Championship.

== Qualified teams ==
Team	Method of qualification	Date of qualification
France	2016 IKF European Korfball Championship First Round West 3rd place	5 June 2016
Hungary	2018 IKF European Korfball Championship First Round winner	29 October 2017
Ireland	2018 IKF European Korfball Championship First Round 3rd place	21 March 2018
Scotland	2016 IKF European Korfball Championship First Round East 4th place	4 June 2016
Serbia	2018 IKF European Korfball Championship First Round runner-up	29 October 2017
Slovakia	2016 IKF European Korfball Championship First Round East 3rd place	4 June 2016
Wales	2016 IKF European Korfball Championship First Round West 4th place	5 June 2016

1. on 21 March 2018 the news was released that Russia would not participate in the 2018 IKF European Korfball A-Championship, allowing Poland to take its place and move up from the B-Championship, while Ireland in its turn took the place of Poland in the B-Championship

== Group stage ==
The eight teams were divided into two groups of four, with all teams progressing to the quarter-finals. The groups were named C and D to distinguish them from Groups A and B in the 2018 IKF European Korfball A-Championship, held at the same time and location as the 2018 IKF European Korfball B-Championship.

=== Group C ===
Pos	Team	Pld	W	OTW	OTL	L	GF	GA	GD	Pts
1	Slovakia	2	2	0	0	0	34	29	+5	6
2	France	2	0	1	0	1	33	33	0	2
3	Ireland	2	0	0	1	1	27	31	−4	1

Source: IKF

Team 1	Score	Team 2
Slovakia	18 − 17	France
France	16 − 15 (OT)	Ireland
Ireland	12 − 16	Slovakia

=== Group D ===
Pos	Team	Pld	W	OTW	OTL	L	GF	GA	GD	Pts
1	Hungary	3	2	1	0	0	51	30	+21	8
2	Scotland	3	2	0	1	0	49	43	+6	7
3	Wales	3	1	0	0	2	35	31	+4	3
4	Serbia	3	0	0	0	3	33	64	−31	0

Source: IKF

Team 1	Score	Team 2
Scotland	12 − 11	Wales
Hungary	25 − 8	Serbia
Scotland	13 − 14 (OT)	Hungary
Wales	15 − 7	Serbia
Serbia	18 − 24	Scotland
Hungary	12 − 9	Wales

== Intermediate stage ==
Following the group stage, an intermediate round was held, featuring the group winners and the teams finishing last in the group stage of the A-Championship. The winners continued in the A-Championship knockout stage, the losers moved to or remained in the B-Championship knockout stage. As 10 nations from Europe qualify for the 2019 IKF World Korfball Championship, the winners of these matches qualified for the 2019 IKF World Korfball Championship by virtue of finishing in the top 8. The losing teams could still qualify.

16 October 2018
18:15

Hungary	17 − 16	Poland
	Report

Gorredijk

16 October 2018
20:00

Czech Republic	33 − 12	Slovakia
	Report

Gorredijk

== Knockout stage ==
=== Main bracket ===
Quarterfinals
Slovakia	22
Serbia	19
Ireland	15
Scotland	13
France	6
Wales	12
bye
Poland

Semifinals
Slovakia	9
Ireland	13
Wales	15
Poland	19

Finals
Ireland	7
Poland	21
Third place
Slovakia	18
Wales	15

=== Consolation bracket ===
Due to the late cancellation of Turkey, only three teams were available to play for the last places. The three losing teams from the quarterfinals would play a round-robin system, playing each other once. France and Serbia were first matched against each other, with the loser playing Scotland to determine last place. The winners of the first two matches then met to determine the fifth and sixth place finisher.

Consolation Match
France	16
Serbia	13

Match to determine last place
Scotland	22
Serbia	21

5th-6th place match
France	15
Scotland	14

== Final standing ==
Key
Qualified for the 2019 IKF World Korfball Championship and the 2020 IKF European Korfball B-Championship
Qualified for the 2020 IKF European Korfball B-Championship

Rank	Team
1st place, gold medalist(s)	Poland
2nd place, silver medalist(s)	Ireland
3rd place, bronze medalist(s)	Slovakia
4	Wales
5	France
6	Scotland
7	Serbia
