= 2013 Korfball European Bowl =

International sporting event

The 2013 Korfball European Bowl was the qualifying competition for the 2014 European Korfball Championship, split into two divisions: Central, in Prievidza (Slovakia), and Eastern, in Papendrecht (Netherlands). 3 best teams of each division will join the 10 qualified-teams-by-ranking for competing in the European Championship.

== Central division ==
The Central Division took place in Prievidza (Slovakia) from 8 to 9 June and the winners were Slovakia. Serbia and Scotland were qualified for European Championships too.

08/06/2013	Sweden	11-25	Scotland
08/06/2013	Slovakia	23-15	Serbia
08/06/2013	Serbia	28-13	Sweden
08/06/2013	Slovakia	25-10	Scotland
09/06/2013	Scotland	9-23	Serbia
09/06/2013	Slovakia	20-18	Sweden

Central Division	Pts	P	W	L	GF	GA	GD
Slovakia	9	3	3	0	68	43	+25
Serbia	6	3	2	1	66	45	+21
Scotland	3	3	1	2	44	59	-15
Sweden	0	3	0	3	42	73	-31

=== Central division final standings ===
Central division final standings
1	Slovakia
2	Serbia
3	Scotland
4	Sweden

== Eastern division ==
The Eastern Division took place in Papendrecht (Netherlands) from 18 to 19 October, and the winners were Turkey. Wales and Ireland were the other teams qualified for the European Championship.

=== First round ===
18/10/2013	Wales	11-10	France
18/10/2013	Romania	9-14	Wales
18/10/2013	France	12-7	Romania

POOL A	Pts	P	W	L	GF	GA	GD
Wales	6	2	2	0	25	19	+6
France	3	2	1	1	22	18	+4
Romania	0	2	0	2	16	26	-10

18/10/2013	Ireland	15-5	Greece
18/10/2013	Turkey	14-9	Ireland
18/10/2013	Greece	3-10	Turkey

POOL B	Pts	P	W	L	PF	PA	DP
Turkey	6	2	2	0	24	12	+12
Ireland	3	2	1	1	24	19	+5
Greece	0	2	0	2	8	25	-17

=== Final round ===
5th-6th

19/10/2013	Romania	13-10	Greece

Finals

Semi-finals
October 19, 2013
Wales	8 g.g.
Ireland	7
October 19, 2013
Turkey	12
France	6

Final
October 19, 2013
Wales	4
Turkey	7
Third place
October 19, 2013
Ireland	15 g.g.
France	14

=== Eastern division final standings ===
Eastern division final standings
1	Turkey
2	Wales
3	Ireland
4	France
5	Greece
6	Romania
