= 2023 IKF U17 Korfball World Cup =

Sporting event in the Netherlands

Tournament details
- Host country: Netherlands
- Dates: 1–2 July 2023
- Teams: 11
- Venue(s): De Vijfkamp, Eindhoven

Final positions
- Champions: Chinese Taipei (1st title)
- Runners-up: Netherlands
- Third place: Czech Republic
- Fourth place: Hungary

The 23rd edition of the U17 Korfball World Cup took place in Eindhoven, Netherlands. It has been organized by the Royal Dutch Korfball Association (KNKV) and patronized by the International Korfball Federation.

== History ==
https://web.archive.org/web/20160402083559/http://www.u17kwc.com/history.html

IKF U17 Korfball World Cup

https://korfball.sport/tag/u17-korfball-world-cup/

https://web.archive.org/web/20250313142248/https://www.u17kwc.com/

First event took place in 1999

The Netherlands won 21 times, Belgium, Chinese Taipei and Russia each 1 time.

=== Editions Ranking ===
1. 1999: Belgium,Netherlands,Netherlands
2. 2000: Netherlands,Czech Republic,Netherlands
3. 2001: {{}},{{}},{{}}
4. 2002: {{}},{{}},{{}}
5. 2003: {{}},{{}},{{}}

== Group stage ==
Competing countries were divided into two groups.

=== Group A ===
Pos	Team	Pld	W	L	GF	GA	GD	Pts	
1	Netherlands	4	4	0	0	0	0	12	Semifinals
2	Hungary	4	3	1	0	0	0	9	Semifinals
3	Portugal	4	2	2	0	0	0	6	
4	England	4	1	3	0	0	0	3	
5	Germany	4	0	4	0	0	0	0	

Updated to match(es) played on 2 July 2023. Source:

Home \ Away	NED	HUN	POR	ENG	GER
Netherlands	—			30–6	36–7
Hungary	4–23	—	11–10		
Portugal	7–26		—	11–10	14–3
England		9–11		—	
Germany		5–13		1–12	—

Updated to match(es) played on 2 July 2023. Source:
Legend: Blue = home team win; Red = away team win.

=== Group B ===
Pos	Team	Pld	W	L	GF	GA	GD	Pts	
1	Chinese Taipei	5	5	0	0	0	0	15	Semifinals
2	Czech Republic	5	4	1	0	0	0	12	Semifinals
3	Belgium	5	3	2	0	0	0	9	
4	Catalonia	5	2	3	0	0	0	6	
5	Slovakia	5	1	4	0	0	0	3	
6	Hong Kong	5	0	5	0	0	0	0	

Updated to match(es) played on 2 July 2023. Source:

Home \ Away	TPE	CZE	BEL	CAT	SVK	HKG
Chinese Taipei	—			13–7		18–1
Czech Republic		—	10–7			
Belgium			—	16–5	12–4	
Catalonia				—		14–0
Slovakia	0–21	0–11			—	
Hong Kong		4–25				—

Updated to match(es) played on 2 July 2023. Source:
Legend: Blue = home team win; Red = away team win.

== Final stages ==
2 July 2023 Game 26	Hong Kong	10–12	Germany	Eindhoven
09:30 (CEST)
		Report

2 July 2023 Game 27	Portugal	10–23	Catalonia	Eindhoven
10:30 (CEST)
		Report

2 July 2023 Game 28	England	6–21	Belgium	Eindhoven
10:30 (CEST)
		Report

2 July 2023 Semifinal 1	Netherlands	25–6	Czech Republic	Eindhoven
11:30 (CEST)
		Report

2 July 2023 Semifinal 2	Chinese Taipei	24–11	Hungary	Eindhoven
11:30 (CEST)
		Report

2 July 2023 Game31	Slovakia	23–8	Hong Kong	Eindhoven
12:30 (CEST)
		Report

2 July 2023 5th place	Catalonia	9–17	Belgium	Eindhoven
13:30 (CEST)
		Report

2 July 2023 7th place	Portugal	10–28	England	Eindhoven
13:30 (CEST)
		Report

2 July 2023 3rd place	Czech Republic	18–8	Hungary	Eindhoven
14:30 (CEST)
		Report

2 July 2023 game35	Germany	8–9	Slovakia	Eindhoven
14:30 (CEST)
		Report

2 July 2023 Final	Netherlands	22–24	Chinese Taipei	Eindhoven
15:30 (CEST)
		Report

IKF U17 Korfball World Cup

First title

== Final ranking ==
Rank	Team
1st place, gold medalist(s)	Chinese Taipei
2nd place, silver medalist(s)	Netherlands
3rd place, bronze medalist(s)	Czech Republic
4	Hungary
5	Belgium
6	Catalonia
7	England
8	Portugal
9	Slovakia
10	Germany
11	Hong Kong
