= Commonwealth Korfball Championships =

The first Commonwealth Korfball Championships were held in Croydon from 14 to 16 July 2006.

This was a tournament recognised by the International Korfball Federation, and hosted by the British Korfball Association, at the Whitgift School, Croydon.

Participants came from Australia, England, Scotland, South Africa and Wales. Additionally teams from Ireland and North America (USA and Canada) were invited to take part, to help the development of korfball in these countries.

The tournament was by way of a round-robin championships, with England the eventual winners.

1st Commonwealth and friends Championship
Team	Pts	P	W	D	L	GF	GA
England	12	6	6	0	0	130	25
South Africa	9	6	4	1	1	89	51
Ireland	9	6	4	1	1	82	56
Wales	5	6	2	1	3	53	78
Australia	5	6	2	1	3	45	79
(United States) (Canada) North America	2	6	1	0	5	41	88
Scotland	0	6	0	0	6	30	93

1st Commonwealth Championship
Team	Pts	P	W	D	L	GF	GA
England	8	4	4	0	0	92	16
South Africa	6	4	3	0	1	56	31
Wales	3	4	1	1	2	32	57
Australia	3	4	1	1	2	25	59
Scotland	0	4	0	0	4	20	62

Friday 14 July
Wales	10 - 13	Ireland
South Africa	17 - 4	(United States) (Canada) North America
Australia	10 - 5	Scotland
England	13 - 4	Ireland
North America (United States) (Canada)	6 - 10	Australia
Wales	6 - 30	England
Scotland	4 - 18	South Africa
Saturday 15 July
Scotland	9 - 12	(United States) (Canada) North America
South Africa	16 - 16	Ireland
Wales	8 - 8	Australia
England	25 - 5	(United States) (Canada) North America
Scotland	1 - 19	Ireland
Wales	9 - 11	South Africa
England	24 - 2	Australia
Sunday 16 July
Wales	11 - 8	(United States) (Canada) North America
Ireland	14 - 10	Australia
England	13 - 5	South Africa
Scotland	8 - 9	Wales
Ireland	16 - 6	(United States) (Canada) North America
England	25 - 3	Scotland
Australia	5 - 22	South Africa
