= English Korfball Association =

Governing body of korfball in England

- Sport: Korfball
- Abbreviation: EKA
- Founded: 2006
- Affiliation: International Korfball Federation

Official website
- www.englandkorfball.co.uk
- (England)

England Korfball Association, also simply known as the EKA, is the governing body for the sport of Korfball in England. Separated from the British Korfball Association (BKA) in 2006, it is the Korfball association responsible for overseeing all aspects of the game in its territory. This includes oversight and administration of the Junior and Senior English National Korfball teams, of the leagues across England, the highest tier of which is the England Korfball League, and of other domestic competitions such as the youth and senior Inter-Area competitions.

The EKA is a separate national governing body from the Scottish, Welsh and Irish Korfball Associations.

== England/British Korfball Presidents / Chairs ==
Entries in Bold are designated as Head of the Organisation.

Presidents

- **1946/48 – Alderman J Clark**
- **1948/51 – Mr C. H. Walbancke**
- **1951/52 – Mr J. W. Yapp**
- **1952 – J.R.T Hadley**
- **1952/69 - Tbc**
- **1969/75 - Ray E. Thorpe**
- **1976 - Michael Renew (tbc)**
- **1976/82 - Tbc**
- **1982/88 – Geoff Carter**
- 1988 - Philip Buttinger***

Chairpersons*

- 1975 - Peter Allan (tbc)
- 1975 - Michael Renew (tbc)
- 1975/82 - Tbc
- 1982/83 - Jan Buttinger
- 1983/88 - Graham Crafter*
- **1988/90 - Geoff Carter (previously president)***
- **1990/91 - Peter Burt (July 1990 1 month), Max Buttinger (August 1990)**
- **1991/93 - Nigel Etheridge**
- 1993/98 - Terry Daniels**
- **1998/00 – Max Buttinger***
- **2000/05 - Peter Allan (resigned October 2005)***
- **2005/06 - Anna Janes (Acting Chair from October 2005)***
- **2006/07 - Corrine Buckland***
- **2007/08 - David Hubbard***
- **2008/11 - Anna Jeanes***
- **2011/12 - Nick Donovan***
- **2012/18 - Craig Gosling***

2018 to Present - Ellen Pearce *Source - BKA/EKA Newsletter/AGM Minutes

** Source - BKA/IKF Documentation showing chair 1993/94, 1996/97

***1988 - President became an Honorary Position

Lifetime President

- 1988 - Philip Buttinger Snr

== The Jan Hanekroot Award - Lifetime Achievement ==
- 2005 - Graham Crafter
- 2009 - Steve Barker
- 2014 - Sam Wells
- 2015 - Jackie and David Hubbard

== Marion Atkinson Award of Honour ==
- 1985 - Philip Buttinger
- 1886 - Jill & Terry Sage
- 1987 - Peter Allan
- 1988 - E & A Williamson
- 1989 - P & J Burt
- 1990 - G & J Carter
- 1991 - E Renew
- 1993 - Graham & Valerie Crafter
- 1994 - Jan Hanekroot
- 1995 - Paul Brooks
- 1996 - Stephen Barker
- 1998 - Alan Burrows
- 2001 - Jon Herbert
- 2003 - Jackie Hubbard
- 2005 - Frank Sieber
- 2006 - Kevin Allen
- 2009 - Peter Teague
- 2011 - David Bond
- 2014 - Nicky Bedford

== Graham Crafter Award of Distinction ==
- 2005 - Dom McDonald
- 2006 - Kathy Shaw
- 2009 - Lee Matthews
- 2011 - Katie Ellis
- 2014 - Dean Woods
