= 2024 IKF European Korfball B-Championship =

2024 European Korfball B-Championship
Tournament details
- Host country: Turkey
- City: Kemer
- Dates: 14 to 19 October 2024
- Teams: 8
- Venue: 1

Final positions
- Champions: Poland (3rd title)
- Runners-up: Turkey
- Third place: Wales
- Fourth place: Slovakia

Tournament statistics
- Matches played: 20

The 2024 European Korfball B-Championship was held in Kemer, Turkey from 14 to 19 October 2024 proclaiming Poland as the winners. Games were played at Goynuk Kemer Municipality Atatürk Sports Hall and the first 5 teams qualified for the IKF European Korfball Championship 2026.

== Group stage ==
The eight teams were divided into two groups of four. The first two of each group advanced to the main bracket. The last two of each group continued in the consolidation bracket to determine a full ranking of 9th to 16th place.

=== Group A ===
Pos	Team	Pld	W	OTW	OTL	L	GF	GA	GD	Pts
1	Turkey	3	3	0	0	0	44	28	+16	9
2	Slovakia	3	2	0	0	1	46	35	+11	6
3	Switzerland	3	1	0	0	2	42	47	−5	3
4	Scotland	3	0	0	0	3	27	49	−22	0

Source: IKF

Team 1	Score	Team 2
Slovakia	13-6	Scotland
Turkey	13-8	Switzerland
Switzerland	19-13	Scotland
Turkey	14-12	Slovakia
Slovakia	21-15	Switzerland
Turkey	17-8	Scotland

=== Group B ===
Pos	Team	Pld	W	OTW	OTL	L	GF	GA	GD	Pts
1	Poland	3	3	0	0	0	49	29	+20	9
2	Wales	3	2	0	0	1	45	37	+8	6
3	Serbia	3	1	0	0	2	37	48	−11	3
4	Ireland	3	0	0	0	3	29	46	−17	0

Source: IKF

Team 1	Score	Team 2
Poland	19-8	Serbia
Ireland	6-18	Wales
Poland	15-11	Ireland
Serbia	16-17	Wales
Ireland	12-13	Serbia
Wales	10-15	Poland

== Knockout stage ==
=== Main bracket ===
Semifinals
Poland	15(gg)
Slovakia	14
Turkey	14
Wales	11

Finals
Poland	14
Turkey	8
Third place
Slovakia	11
Wales	12(gg)

=== Consolidation bracket ===
Semi-finals
Switzerland	11
Ireland	9
Serbia	22
Scotland	15

5th place match
Switzerland	12
Serbia	11
7th place match
Ireland	15
Scotland	9

== Final standing ==
Rank	Team
1st place, gold medalist(s)	Poland
2nd place, silver medalist(s)	Turkey
3rd place, bronze medalist(s)	Wales
4	Slovakia
5	Switzerland
6	Serbia
7	Ireland
8	Scotland
