= 2014 IKF European Korfball Championship =

2014 European Korfball Championship
Tournament details
- Host country: Portugal
- City: Maia
- Dates: 25 October 2014– 2 November 2014
- Teams: 16
- Venue(s): 1 (in 1 host city)

Final positions
- Champions: Netherlands (5th title)
- Runners-up: Belgium
- Third place: Portugal
- Fourth place: England

Tournament statistics
- Matches played: 48
- Goals scored: 1,759 (36.65 per match)
- Top scorer(s): (Netherlands) Mick Snel (Poland) Krzysztof Rubinkowski (32 goals)

The 2014 European Korfball Championship was held in Portugal from October 25 to November 2, with 16 national teams in competition.

The tournament also served as a European qualifier for the 2015 Korfball World Championship, with the top ten nations qualifying for the world championship.

== Group stage ==
The group stages took place in Maia. The IKF had implemented a new format of qualifying from the group stages. In these European Championships, the top eight nations were seeded in to pools A & B. In these pools the top three teams qualified for the quarter-finals. The other nations in pools C & D needed to finish top of their pool in order to reach the quarter-finals.

=== Group A ===
Pos	Team	Pld	W	OTW	OTL	L	GF	GA	GD	Pts	Qualification
1	Netherlands	3	3	0	0	0	117	42	+75	9	Quarter-finals
2	England	3	2	0	0	1	52	72	−20	6	Quarter-finals
3	Russia	3	0	1	0	2	50	76	−26	2	Quarter-finals
4	Germany	3	0	0	1	2	44	73	−29	1	9th–16th place play-offs

Source: IKF

Team 1	Score	Team 2
Russia	18 − 21	England
Germany	14 − 38	Netherlands
Russia	17 − 41	Netherlands
Germany	16 − 20	England
England	11 − 38	Netherlands
Germany	14 − 15^{G}	Russia

Key: ^{G} denotes win by golden goal.

=== Group B ===
Pos	Team	Pld	W	OTW	OTL	L	GF	GA	GD	Pts	Qualification
1	Belgium	3	3	0	0	0	72	42	+30	9	Quarter-finals
2	Portugal	3	2	0	0	1	64	55	+9	6	Quarter-finals
3	Czech Republic	3	1	0	0	2	53	73	−20	3	Quarter-finals
4	Catalonia	3	0	0	0	3	43	62	−19	0	9th–16th place play-offs

Source: IKF

Team 1	Score	Team 2
Czech Republic	17 − 30	Belgium
Catalonia	16 − 23	Portugal
Portugal	23 − 15	Czech Republic
Belgium	18 − 7	Catalonia
Czech Republic	21 − 20	Catalonia
Belgium	24 − 18	Portugal

=== Group C ===
Pos	Team	Pld	W	OTW	OTL	L	GF	GA	GD	Pts	Qualification
1	Poland	3	3	0	0	0	56	34	+22	9	Quarter-finals
2	Wales	3	1	0	1	1	44	47	−3	4	9th–16th place play-offs
3	Turkey	3	1	0	0	2	44	51	−7	3	9th–16th place play-offs
4	Serbia	3	0	1	0	2	42	54	−12	2	9th–16th place play-offs

Source: IKF

Team 1	Score	Team 2
Turkey	13 − 23	Poland
Serbia	19^{G} − 18	Wales
Turkey	12 − 14	Wales
Serbia	9 − 17	Poland
Poland	16 − 12	Wales
Turkey	19 − 14	Serbia

Key: ^{G} denotes win by golden goal.

=== Group D ===
Pos	Team	Pld	W	OTW	OTL	L	GF	GA	GD	Pts	Qualification
1	Hungary	3	3	0	0	0	64	42	+22	9	Quarter-finals
2	Scotland	3	2	0	0	1	53	46	+7	6	9th–16th place play-offs
3	Ireland	3	0	1	0	2	40	53	−13	2	9th–16th place play-offs
4	Slovakia	3	0	0	1	2	34	50	−16	1	9th–16th place play-offs

Source: IKF

Team 1	Score	Team 2
Ireland	14 − 19	Hungary
Scotland	15 − 10	Slovakia
Ireland	15^{G} − 14	Slovakia
Scotland	18 − 25	Hungary
Hungary	20 − 10	Slovakia
Ireland	11 − 20	Scotland

Key: ^{G} denotes win by golden goal.

== Knockout stage ==
=== 1st–8th place play-offs ===
Quarter-finals
Netherlands	45
Hungary	12
Russia	23
Portugal	27
Belgium	40
Poland	11
England^{G}	20
Czech Republic	19

Semi-finals
Netherlands	41
Portugal	11
Belgium	26
England	11

Final
Netherlands	32
Belgium	20
Third place
Portugal	22
England	14

5th–8th place play-offs
Hungary	14	Russia	18
Russia	27	Czech Republic	26
Poland	7	Hungary	16
Czech Republic	18	Poland	10

Key: ^{G} denotes win by golden goal.

=== 9th–16th place play-offs ===
9th–16th place play-offs
Germany	26
Slovakia	9
Scotland	15
Turkey	13
Catalonia	26
Serbia	8
Wales	11
Ireland	13

9th–12th place play-offs
Germany	30
Scotland	2
Catalonia	29
Ireland	10

Ninth place
Germany	17
Catalonia	18
11th place
Scotland	18
Ireland	14

13th–16th place play-offs
Slovakia	18	Slovakia	11
Turkey	16	Serbia	15
Serbia	18	Turkey	14
Wales	15	Wales	11

== Final standing ==
Key
Qualified for the 2015 IKF World Korfball Championship
Qualified for the 2015 IKF World Korfball Championship as hosts (already pre-tournament)

Rank	Team
1st place, gold medalist(s)	Netherlands
2nd place, silver medalist(s)	Belgium
3rd place, bronze medalist(s)	Portugal
4	England
5	Czech Republic
6	Russia
7	Hungary
8	Poland
9	Catalonia
10	Germany
11	Scotland
12	Ireland
13	Serbia
14	Slovakia
15	Turkey
16	Wales
