= Great Britain national korfball team =

National sports team

Great Britain
- Association: British Korfball Association (BKA)
- IKF membership: 1946
- IKF code: See ENG, WAL, SCO
- IKF rank: See ENG, WAL, SCO

World Championships
- Appearances: 7
- First appearance: 1978
- Best result: 3rd place, 1987

World Games
- Appearances: 8
- First appearance: 1985
- Best result: 4th place, 1985

European Championships
- Appearances: 3
- First appearance: 1998
- Best result: 5th place, 1998, 2002, 2006
- http://www.korfball.co.uk/

The Great Britain korfball team is managed by the British Korfball Association (BKA), representing Great Britain in korfball international competitions. In 2007 it was split in 3 national teams: England, Wales and Scotland, that compete in all international competitions except the World Games, where they compete as a unified Great Britain and Northern Ireland korfball team. A unified Ireland team is represented separately.

== Tournament history ==
World Championships
Year	Championship	Host	Classification
1978	1st World Championship	Amsterdam (The Netherlands)	4th place
1984	2nd World Championship	Antwerp (Belgium)	4th place
1987	3rd World Championship	Makkum (The Netherlands)	3rd place
1991	4th World Championship	Antwerp (Belgium)	5th place
1995	5th World Championship	New Delhi (India)	8th place
1999	6th World Championship	Adelaide (Australia)	3rd place
2003	7th World Championship	Rotterdam (The Netherlands)	5th place

- Since 2007 it was split in 3: England national team, Wales national team and Scotland national team.

World Games
Year	Championship	Host	Classification
1985	2nd World Games	London (England)	4th place
1989	3rd World Games	Karlsruhe (Germany)	5th place
1993	4th World Games	The Hague (Netherlands)	6th place
2001	6th World Games	Akita (Japan)	5th place
2005	7th World Games	Duisburg (Germany)	6th place
2009	8th World Games	Kaohsiung (Taiwan)	7th place
2013	9th World Games	Cali (Colombia)	5th place
2017	10th World Games	Wrocław (Poland)	7th place

European Championships
Year	Championship	Host	Classification
1998	1st European Championship	Portugal	5th place
2002	2nd European Championship	Terrassa (Spain)	5th place
2006	3rd European Championship	Budapest (Hungary)	5th place

- Since 2007 it was split in 3: England national team, Wales national team and Scotland national team.

== See also ==
- England national korfball team
- Wales national korfball team
- Scotland national korfball team
