= 2007 Korfball European Bowl =

2007 Korfball European Bowl is the European Championship "B" of korfball played by the countries that have not qualified for the World Championships. It was split into two divisions, Western and Eastern.

The champions of both divisions played the final during the 2007 Korfball World Championship and the winner was Slovakia.

== Western division ==
The western division was played in Luxembourg, on May 12 and 13, with the participation of 6 national teams and the winner was Wales.

It was the first official performance for some of the national teams: Ireland, Scotland and Wales, and the international debut of Sweden. Luxembourg and France were the two other participants.

Scotland	7–10	France
Luxembourg	4–6	Ireland
Sweden	4–11	Wales
Scotland	3–8	Ireland
Luxembourg	10*–7	Sweden
Wales	10–7	France
Ireland	11–4	Sweden
Scotland	5–9	Wales
Luxembourg	5–8	France
Scotland	9–5	Sweden
Luxembourg	4–8	Wales
France	12–8	Ireland
Scotland	13–6	Luxembourg
France	9–4	Sweden
Ireland	8–11	Wales

* penalty shots

West division	Pts	P	W	L	PF	PA
Wales	15	5	0	0	49	28
France	12	4	0	1	46	34
Ireland	9	3	0	2	41	34
Scotland	6	2	0	3	37	38
Luxembourg	2	1*	0	4	29	42
Sweden	1	0	0	5*	24	50

== Eastern division ==
The Eastern division was played in Serbia, on June 16 and 17, with the participation of 5 national teams and the winner was Slovakia.

Romania	5–6	Serbia
Greece	15–4	Bulgaria
Romania	4–19	Slovakia
Serbia	23–5	Bulgaria
Greece	3–20	Slovakia
Bulgaria	3–10	Romania
Serbia	5–17	Slovakia
Greece	6*–5	Romania
Bulgaria	2–31	Slovakia
Serbia	17–8	Greece

* golden goal

East division	Pts	P	W	L	PF	PA
Slovakia	12	4	0	0	87	14
Serbia	9	3	0	1	51	35
Greece	5	2*	0	2	32	46
Romania	4	1	0	3	24	34
Bulgaria	0	0	0	4	14	79

== European Bowl 2007 Final ==
The final was held in Brno (Czech Republic), in the 2007 Korfball World Championship.

November 9, 2007; 13:30
November 9, 2007; 13:30	Slovakia	14-6	Wales	Brno
November 9, 2007; 13:30		Details		Brno

2007 Korfball European Bowl champions

Slovakia

== See also ==
- International Korfball Federation
- Korfball European Bowl
