= Luxembourg national korfball team =

National sports team

Luxembourg
- Association: Federation Luxembourgeoise du Korfball
- IKF membership: 1976
- IKF code: LUX (Luxembourg)
- IKF rank: 34 (Nov. 2014)

World Championships
- Appearances: 1
- First appearance: 1978
- Best result: 8th, 1978

European Bowl
- Appearances: 2
- First appearance: 2007
- Best result: 5th (west), 2007, 2009
- https://web.archive.org/web/20071111225815/http://www.korfball.lu/

The Luxembourg national korfball team was managed by the Federation Luxembourgeoise du Korfball (FLKB), representing Luxembourg in korfball international competitions. Currently there are no teams in Luxembourg

== Tournament history ==
World Championships
Year	Championship	Host	Classification
1978	1st World Championship	Amsterdam (The Netherlands)	8th place

European Bowl
Year	Championship	Host	Classification
2007	2nd European Bowl	Luxembourg	5th place (West)
2009	3rd European Bowl	Luxembourg (West)	5th place (West)

== Current squad ==
National team in the 2009 European Bowl

- Tanja Friob
- Carole Haan
- Edith Hornick
- Carole Oestreicher
- Jenni Schmidt
- Magali Walch
- Eiti Laure Stein
- Stephanie Weber
- Rudi Berckmans
- Giovanni Clausi
- Tom Gusenburger
- Christian Haan
- Yves Rauen
- Michel Torres
- Coach: Laurent Schussler

National team in the 2007 European Bowl

- Edith Hornick
- Tania Ackermann
- Carole Haan
- Stéphanie Weber
- Elisa Gerten
- Magali Walch
- Carole Oestreicher
- Marc Ferring
- Tom Gusenburger
- Yves Rauen
- Nicolas Theis
- Georges Tonteling
- Jan-Willem Van koeverden
- Rudi Berckmans
- Coach: Jan Van Waarden
