= Greece national korfball team =

National sports team

Greece
- Association: Hellenic Korfball & Ball-Sports; Federation (HKBSF)
- IKF membership: 2003
- IKF code: GRE (Greece)
- IKF rank: 32 (Nov. 2025)

European Bowl
- Appearances: 4
- First appearance: 2007
- Best result: 3rd (east), 2007

The Greece national korfball team is managed by the Hellenic Korfball & Ball-Sports Federation (HKBSF), representing Greece in korfball international competitions.

== Tournament history ==
European B-Championship
Year	Championship	Host	Classification
2021	2nd European B-Championship	Wrocław (Poland)	6th place

European Bowl
Year	Championship	Host	Classification
2007	2nd European Bowl	Arandjelovac (Serbia) (East)	3rd place (East)
2009	3rd European Bowl	Prievidza (Slovakia) (East)	6th place (East)
2013	4th European Bowl	Papendrecht (Netherlands) (East)	5th place (East)
2016	5th European Bowl	Slovakia (East)	6th place (East)

Balcans Championship
Year	Championship	Host	Classification
2006	1st Balkan Korfball Championship	Neo Petritsi (Greece)	2nd place
2007	2nd Balkan Korfball Championship	Arandjelovac (Serbia)	2nd place
2007	3rd Balkan Korfball Championship	Blagoevgrad (Bulgaria)	3rd place

== Current squad ==
National team in the 2013 European Bowl

- Georgia Barla
- Georgia Kathiotou
- Katerina Panagiotidou
- Flora Papageorgiou
- Paraskevi Touri
- Giorgos Chotzoglou
- Angelos Kokolakis
- Filippos Manavopoulos
- Stamatis Mavros
- Vasileios Nasis
- Triantafyllos Papafloratos
- Giannis Sarrigiannis
- Coach: Angelos Kokolakis
