= Korfball in Wales =

Welsh Korfball Association
- Cymdeithas Pêl-Côrff Cymreig (Welsh)
- Sport: Korfball
- Abbreviation: WKA; CPC (Welsh)
- Founded: 2002
- Affiliation: International Korfball Federation
- Affiliation date: 2007
- Headquarters: Sport Wales National Centre, Cardiff

Official website
- www.welshkorfball.org
- (Wales)

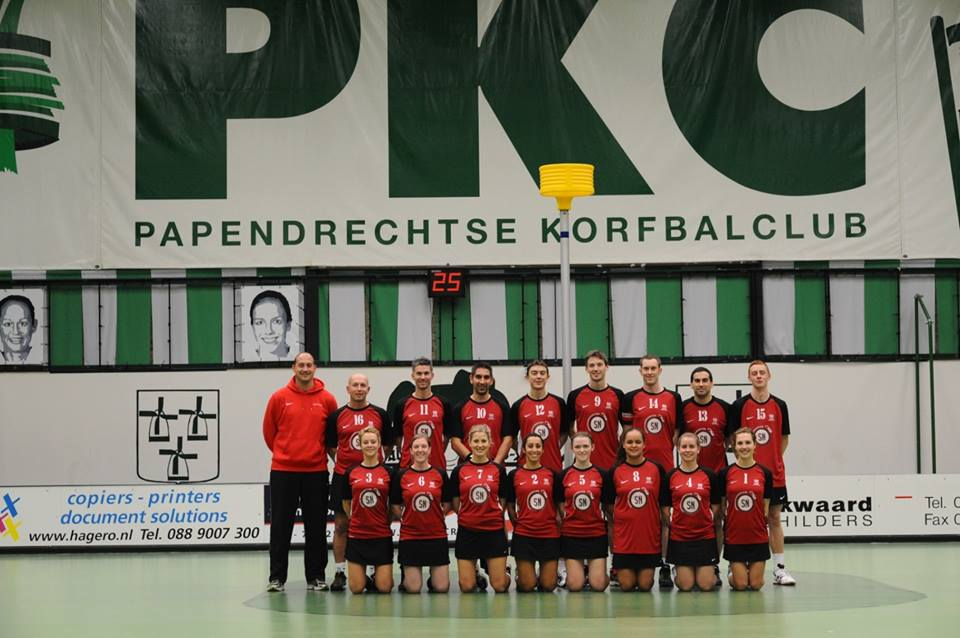
Welsh Korfball Team at the Eurobowl in 2013

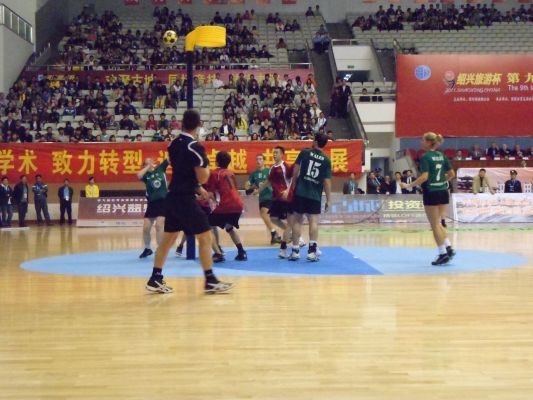
Wales team competing in the World Championship in 2011

Korfball in Wales has been played since 1991 and is managed by the Welsh Korfball Association. The association was established in 2002 and the Welsh Korfball Squad was formed in 2005. In 2007, the International Korfball Federation admitted Wales as an associate member.

Welsh clubs traditionally competed against English clubs from the South West of England and the inaugural Welsh National Korfball League was founded in 2007, though the top teams in Wales continue to participate in the English league structure. Welsh clubs also compete in the IKF Europa Cup, Welsh Championships, and BUCS Competitions.

The Welsh Korfball Squad has been successful on the international stage, appearing at their only World Championship in 2011 following the withdrawal of Hungary. Wales participated the World Championship Qualifiers in Turkey, 2022, and hosted its first official IKF event, Round 1 of the Europa Cup, in Cardiff in September 2016, followed by the Celtic Tri-Nations and Champions League First Round in 2023.

== Governance ==
The Welsh Korfball Association (Welsh: Cymdeithas Pêl-côrff Cymru) is the governing body of Korfball in Wales. It was established in 2002 as the body to promote and develop korfball in Wales. It is responsible for Wales' korfball competitions, the national league, and the Welsh national team. It is affiliated with the British Korfball Association and the International Korfball Federation.

== History ==
Korfball in Wales is currently played in Cardiff, Newport, Rhondda Cynon Taf and Swansea.

Although korfball was created in the Netherlands in 1902, it did not gain significant interest in Wales until nearly a century later. Note that the word côrff has nothing to do with the Welsh word "corff" but is instead a Welsh spelling of the Dutch word "korf," meaning "basket."

The first club in Wales was established in 1991 at Cardiff University by a group of Dutch students. Cardiff University won BUSA Gold at the BSKA National Championships in Cardiff, 2001. The following year, both the Welsh Korfball Association and Cardiff City were established by ex-Cardiff University students. In 2005, Cardiff Dragons was formed as a sister club of Cardiff City and won divisions 1 and 2 in their first two seasons. It took a few years until further clubs arrived but in 2012 Cardiff Raptors was created by students leaving Cardiff University and in 2014 the first club outside of Cardiff, Aberystwyth University, was established, followed by Swansea University in 2017 and Newport Centurions in 2019.

From 2002 to 2007 the Welsh clubs competed in the Excalibur Korfball League (EKL) with teams from the South West of England. When this was disbanded, the Welsh Korfball League came into existence and was administered by the WKA. In 2009, the England Korfball Association (EKA) created a Regional League to promote high level competition between the areas of Wales and South West England.

There is limited youth korfball within Wales and it is mainly focused in primary schools. In 2012 the WKA organised the first Welsh Primary Schools Tournament. Korfball has been included in 5x60 events across Cardiff, including the Cardiff Games.

Wales is now among the top 25 countries competing in the sport.

=== By year ===
Welsh Korfball National Champion
Season	Champion
2002-03	Cardiff University
2003-04	Cardiff City
2004-05	Cardiff City
2005-06	Cardiff Dragons
2006-07	Cardiff Dragons
2007-08	Cardiff City
2008-09	Cardiff University
2009-10	Cardiff City
2010-11	Cardiff Dragons
2011-12	Cardiff City
2012-13	Cardiff City
2013-14	Cardiff University
2014-15	Cardiff University
2015-16	Cardiff University
2016-17	Cardiff City
2017-18	Cardiff City
2018-19	Cardiff City
2019-20	Cardiff City
2021-22	Newport Centurions
2022-23	Newport Centurions
2023-24	Cardiff Raptors
2024-25	Newport Centurions

Club	National Champion
(Wales) Cardiff City	12
(Wales) Cardiff University	5
(Wales) Cardiff Dragons	3

== League competitions ==
During the winter season, korfball is played indoors and is formally organised by the WKA. In the summer, a social outdoor summer league takes place known as "Korf-Lite", utilising half court matches between teams of four players, instead of the standard eight.

=== Welsh Korfball League ===
The Welsh Korfball League (WKL) was formed in 2007 after the EKL was disbanded. It has been the regular competition in Wales since. Beginning in the 2016/17 season, higher level teams stopped competing simultaneously in both the WKL and English leagues.

==== By year ====
Welsh Korfball League
Season	Teams	Winner	Runner-up
2007-08	8	Cardiff City 1	Cardiff Dragons 1
2008-09	7	Cardiff University 1	Cardiff City 1
2009-10	7	Cardiff City 1	Cardiff City 2
2010-11	7	Cardiff University 1	Cardiff City 1
2011-12	8	Cardiff City 1	Cardiff Dragons 1
2012-13	8	Cardiff City 1	Cardiff Dragons 1
2013-14	7	Cardiff University 1	Cardiff City 1
2014-15	7	Cardiff University 1	Cardiff Raptors 1
2015-16	6	Cardiff City 1	Cardiff Raptors 1
2016-17	8	Cardiff City 1	Cardiff University 1
2017-18	7	Cardiff City 2	Cardiff University 1
2018-19	6	Cardiff City 2	Cardiff University 1
2019-20	8	Cardiff City 2	Cardiff University 1
2021-22	9	Newport Centurions 1	Cardiff University 1
2022-23	9	Newport Centurions 1	Cardiff Raptors 2
2023-24	12	Cardiff Raptors 2	Newport Centurions 1
2024-25	12	Newport Centurions 1	Swansea University 1

=== Western Regional League ===
The top Welsh teams participate in England Korfball's Western Regional League (WRL), against teams from the South and South West of England. A merger of Cardiff clubs (City, Dragons, and Raptors) competed for one year as Cardiff Celts. Currently, Cardiff Raptors 1 & 2, and Cardiff City 1 compete in the league.

== Tournament events ==
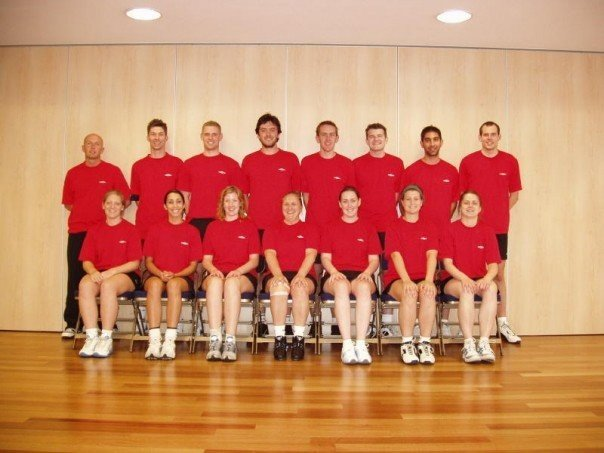
Welsh Korfball Team, 2006 Commonwealth Games

The Association is responsible for maintaining the national team and for the national league.

=== Europa Cup ===
The Welsh National Champion is entitled to participate in the Korfball Champions League (formerly IKF Europa Cup) against other national champions from across Europe. The national champion has been determined by either the winner of the Welsh League or the Welsh Cup, depending on the format for each season. No Welsh club has ever advanced past the First Round of the competition. The history of Welsh clubs competing in the Europa Cup is available.

Cardiff City competed in the first rounds in 2008, 2012, 2013, 2017, 2018, 2019, and 2023; Cardiff Raptors participated in the first round in 2016, which was also the first official IKF event hosted in Wales.

=== Championship ===
The Championship is contested by every team in Wales. The competition is structured using the Welsh National League and the Western Regional League. The Welsh Cup is the top tier, with the winner advancing to represent Wales in the IKF Europa Cup. The Trophy is the middle tier and the Plate is open to all teams.

The Welsh Cup was originally organized as a gala event open to one team from each club. This ran from 2008 to 2014 before being replaced by league placements to determine the national champion. This format faced difficulties due to teams competing in different leagues; therefore, the Welsh Championship was reintroduced, adding the Trophy and Plate tiers to allow every team in Wales to compete.

==== Welsh Cup ====
The Welsh Cup is the final event of the Welsh Championship, contested by Welsh teams across all league competitions to determine the national champion and entrant to the Korfball Champions League (formerly Europa Cup).

Team	Gold	Years	Silver	Years	Bronze	Years
(Wales) Cardiff City	8	2010, 2012, 2017, 2018, 2019, 2022, 2023, 2024	4	2009, 2011, 2022, 2024	1	2025
(Wales) Cardiff University	2	2009, 2014	0		5	2010, 2011, 2012, 2017, 2018
(Wales) Cardiff Dragons	1	2011	2	2010, 2012	2	2009, 2014
(Wales) Cardiff Raptors	1	2025	6	2014, 2017, 2018, 2019, 2024, 2025	2	2022, 2023
(Wales) Newport Centurions	0		1	2023	1	2024
(Wales) Swansea University	0		0		1	2019

==== Welsh Trophy ====
The Welsh Trophy is contested at the Welsh Cup after the top four teams in Wales progress to the semi-finals. The remaining teams play crossover finals to determine a Trophy winner, with an overall position of 5th in the Welsh Cup.

Team	Gold	Years	Silver	Years	Bronze	Years
(Wales) Cardiff University	3	2022, 2023, 2025	1	2024	1	2018
(Wales) Cardiff Raptors	1	2024	2	2018, 2019	2	2022, 2023
(Wales) Cardiff City	1	2018	1	2023	1	2019
(Wales) Cardiff Metropolitan University	1	2019	0		0	
(Wales) Swansea University	0		1	2022	1	2024
(Wales) Newport Centurions	0		1	2025	0	
(Wales) RCT Comets	0		0		1	2025

=== BUCS competitions ===
Cardiff University and Swansea University compete in the BUCS National Competitions. Cardiff University has achieved success at the National Championship winning bronze in 1997 & 2015, and gold in 2001.

An overhaul of the BUCS competitions introduced BUCS points for second and third tier competitions. Cardiff University 1 achieved a silver medal position at the second tier National Trophy in 2023, following Cardiff University 2 earning silver at the third tier National in 2015.

Swansea University won Gold at the National Shield in 2019, with Cardiff Metropolitan University finishing a commendable 4th.

=== Inter-Area ===
Welsh regions compete in the annual EKA Inter-Area against counties in England.

=== Cardiff Freshers' Tournament ===
Cardiff University Korfball Club host the annual beginners' tournament at Talybont Sports Centre. This event is aimed primarily at other universities with requirements placed on team entries stipulating that 50% of the team must be new to the sport.

=== Cardiff Summer Tournament ===
Normally held in August, this annual outdoor event was first organised in 2006. A maiden beach korfball event took place in the summer of 2018.

== Teams ==
=== National team ===
The Welsh Korfball Squad (WKS) was formed in 2005 and competed at their first IKF competition in 2007. In 2011, Wales competed at the IKF World Championship. In 2014, the first Wales U21 squad competed against England u21s and a Wales U19 squad competed in the 2018 Beach Korfball World Cup.

=== Active clubs ===
There are approximately 7 korfball teams in Wales in 2024: Cardiff City, Cardiff Raptors, Newport Centurions, Swansea University, Cardiff University, Swansea Roar and RCT Comets.

Former teams include teams representing Aberystwyth University and Cardiff Metropolitan University.

Team	Founded
Cardiff University	
Cardiff City	2002
Cardiff Raptors	
Swansea University	
Swansea Roar	
RCT Comets	2025
Newport Centurions	2019

=== Former Clubs ===
- Cardiff Dragons - 2005-2015

== See also ==
- Korfball World Championship
- European Korfball Championship
- Korfball European Bowl
- Wales national korfball team
- IKF World Korfball Ranking
