= 2009 Korfball European Bowl =

Korfball tournament

The 2009 Korfball European Bowl was the qualifying competition for the 2010 European Korfball Championship, split into two divisions: West, in Luxembourg, and East, in Prievidza (Slovakia). 3 best teams of each division will join the 10 qualified-teams-by-ranking for competing in the European Championship.

== East division ==
The East Division took place in Prievidza (Slovakia) from 31 October to 1 November and the winners were Slovakia. Serbia and Turkey were qualified for European Championships too.

=== First round ===
Games 31/10/09	Slovakia	11-10	Turkey
Games 31/10/09	Armenia	21-4	Italy
31/10/09	Slovakia	20-6	Italy
31/10/09	Armenia	6-16	Turkey
31/10/09	Slovakia	20-7	Armenia
31/10/09	Turkey	23-3	Italy

POOL A	Pts	P	W	L	PF	PA	DP
Slovakia	9	3	3	0	51	23	+28
Turkey	6	3	2	1	49	20	+29
Armenia	3	3	1	2	34	40	-6
Italy	0	3	0	3	13	64	-51

31/10/09	Serbia	21-3	Greece
31/10/09	Romania	10-8	Greece
31/10/09	Serbia	12-9	Romania

POOL B	Pts	P	W	L	PF	PA	DP
Serbia	6	2	2	0	33	12	+21
Romania	3	2	1	1	19	20	-1
Greece	0	2	0	2	11	31	-20

=== Final round ===
5th-7th places

1/11/09 / Italy / 1-12 / Greece; 1/11/09 / Armenia / 17-10 / Greece; * (The match Armenia-Italy is carried)

Finals

Semi-finals
November 1, 2009
Slovakia	11
Romania	3
November 1, 2009
Turkey	10
Serbia	13

Final
November 1, 2009
Slovakia	10
Serbia	7
Third place
November 1, 2009
Romania	9
Turkey	11

=== East division final standings ===
East division final standings
1	Slovakia
2	Serbia
3	Turkey
4	Romania
5	Armenia
6	Greece
7	Italy

== West division ==
The West Division took place in Luxembourg from 7 to 8 November, and the winners were Wales. Scotland and Ireland were the other teams qualified for the European Championship.

7/11/09	Luxembourg	4-7	Scotland
7/11/09	Wales	11-5	France
7/11/09	Sweden	3-6	Ireland
7/11/09	Luxembourg	6-9	Wales
7/11/09	Sweden	8-20	Scotland
7/11/09	Ireland	11-5	France
7/11/09	Luxembourg	9-10	Sweden
7/11/09	Ireland	3-8	Wales
7/11/09	France	14-11	Scotland
8/11/09	Luxembourg	3-12	Ireland
8/11/09	Sweden	11-7	France
8/11/09	Scotland	5-18	Wales
8/11/09	Luxembourg	6-4	France
8/11/09	Scotland	10-8	Ireland
8/11/09	Wales	12-6	Sweden

	Pts	P	W	L	PF	PA	DP
Wales	15	5	5	0	58	25	+33
Scotland	9	5	3	2	53	52	+1
Ireland	9	5	3	2	40	29	+11
Sweden	6	5	2	3	38	54	-16
Luxembourg	3	5	1	4	28	42	-14
France	3	5	1	4	35	50	-15

=== West division final standings ===
West division final standings
1	Wales
2	Scotland
3	Ireland
4	Sweden
5	Luxembourg
6	France
