= 2002 European Korfball Championship =

2002 European Korfball A-Championship
Tournament details
- Host country: Catalonia
- City: Terrassa; Badalona; Sant Boi de Llobregat; Mataró
- Dates: 31 march to 7 April 2002
- Teams: 10
- Venue: 4 (in 4 host cities)

Final positions
- Champions: Netherlands (2nd title)
- Runners-up: Czech Republic
- Third place: Belgium
- Fourth place: Germany

The 2002 European Korfball Championship was held Catalonia from March 31 to April 7, with 10 national teams in competition. The matches were played in Terrassa, Badalona, Sant Boi de Llobregat and Mataró.

== First round ==
Three best teams of each pool went to second round qualifying matches with The Netherlands and Belgium, that entered then in competition.

POOL A	Pts	P	W	L	PF	PA	DP
Czech Republic	9	3	3	0	62	34	+28
Portugal	6	3	2	1	56	51	+5
Slovakia	3	3	1	2	41	61	-20
Poland	0	3	0	3	36	49	-13

POOL B	Pts	P	W	L	PF	PA	DP
Germany	9	3	3	0	50	28	+22
Great Britain	6	3	2	1	40	33	+7
Catalonia	2	3	1	2	29	42	-13
Hungary	1	3	0	3	32	48	-16

03/31/02	Czech Republic	23–13	Slovakia
03/31/02	Portugal	17–16	Poland
04/01/02	Poland	12–13	Slovakia
04/01/02	Portugal	13–20	Czech Republic
04/02/02	Portugal	26–15	Slovakia
04/02/02	Czech Republic	19–8	Poland

03/31/02	Germany	19–7	Hungary
03/31/02	Catalonia	6–13	Great Britain
04/01/02	Great Britain	14–17	Germany
04/01/02	Catalonia	16*–15	Hungary
04/02/02	Great Britain	13–10	Hungary
04/02/02	Catalonia	7–14	Germany

== Second round qualifying matches ==
04/03/02	Belgium	19–20	Czech Republic
04/03/02	Germany	14–26	Netherlands
04/03/02	Great Britain	16–10	Slovakia
04/03/02	Portugal	19–16	Catalonia

== Second round ==
Pools C and D played for the title and pool E played for 7th to 10th places.

POOL C	Pts	P	W	L	PF	PA	DP
Czech Republic	6	2	2	0	46	23	+23
Germany	3	2	1	1	25	34	-9
Portugal	0	2	0	2	25	39	-14

POOL D	Pts	P	W	L	PF	PA	DP
Netherlands	6	2	2	0	54	23	+31
Belgium	3	2	1	1	37	32	+5
Great Britain	0	2	0	2	16	52	-36

04/04/02	Germany	11–21	Czech Republic
04/05/02	Portugal	12–25	Czech Republic
04/06/02	Germany	14–13	Portugal

04/04/02	Netherlands	24–15	Belgium
04/05/02	Great Britain	8–30	Netherlands
04/06/02	Belgium	22–8	Great Britain

POOL E (7–10)	Pts	P	W	L	PF	PA	DP
Catalonia	9	3	3	0	44	32	+12
Hungary	5	3	2	1	43	43	0
Slovakia	3	3	1	2	36	43	-7
Poland	1	3	0	3	35	40	-5

04/04/02	Hungary	15*–14	Poland
04/05/02	Hungary	15–9	Slovakia
	Catalonia	10–7	Poland
	Slovakia	15–14	Poland
	Catalonia	20–13	Hungary
	Catalonia	14–12	Slovakia

== Finals ==
04/07/02	Portugal	17–18	Great Britain
04/07/02	Germany	9–29	Belgium
04/07/02	Czech Republic	9–15	Netherlands

== Final standings ==
Final standings
1	Netherlands
2	Czech Republic
3	Belgium
4	Germany
5	Great Britain
6	Portugal
7	Catalonia
8	Hungary
9	Slovakia
10	Poland

== See also ==
- European Korfball Championship
- International Korfball Federation
