= 1978 Korfball World Championship =

Tournament details
- Host country: Netherlands
- City: Assen, Nuenen and Amsterdam
- Dates: 6 to 11 November 1978
- Teams: 8
- Venue(s): 3 (in 3 host cities)

Final positions
- Champions: Netherlands (1st title)
- Runners-up: Belgium
- Third place: West Germany
- Fourth place: Great Britain

The 1st Korfball World Championships was held in The Netherlands on November 6–11, in the cities of Assen, Nuenen, and Amsterdam

== First round ==
=== Pool A ===
| Pos | Team | Pld | W | D | L | GF | GA | GD | Pts | Qualification |
|---|---|---|---|---|---|---|---|---|---|---|
| 1 | Netherlands (H) | 3 | 3 | 0 | 0 | 63 | 10 | +53 | 9 | Pools for 1st–4th places |
| 2 | West Germany | 3 | 2 | 0 | 1 | 17 | 27 | −10 | 6 | Pools for 1st–4th places |
| 3 | United States | 3 | 1 | 0 | 2 | 25 | 35 | −10 | 3 | Pools for 5th–8th places |
| 4 | Spain | 3 | 0 | 0 | 3 | 14 | 47 | −33 | 0 | Pools for 5th–8th places |

Updated to match(es) played on 1 November 2015. Source: Worldkorfball.org
(H) Hosts

November 6, 1978
| November 6, 1978 | United States | 6–7 | West Germany | Assen |

November 6, 1978
| November 6, 1978 | Netherlands | 26–2 | Spain | Assen |

November 7, 1978
| November 7, 1978 | Netherlands | 20–6 | United States | Assen |

November 7, 1978
| November 7, 1978 | West Germany | 8–4 | Spain | Assen |

November 8, 1978
| November 8, 1978 | West Germany | 2–17 | Netherlands | Assen |

November 8, 1978
| November 8, 1978 | Spain | 8–13 | United States | Assen |

| Pos | Team | Pld | W | D | L | GF | GA | GD | Pts | Qualification |
|---|---|---|---|---|---|---|---|---|---|---|
| 1 | Belgium | 3 | 3 | 0 | 0 | 70 | 10 | +60 | 9 | Pools for 1st–4th places |
| 2 | Great Britain | 3 | 2 | 0 | 1 | 47 | 25 | +22 | 6 | Pools for 1st–4th places |
| 3 | Papua New Guinea | 3 | 1 | 0 | 2 | 32 | 42 | −10 | 3 | Pools for 5th–8th places |
| 4 | Luxembourg | 3 | 0 | 0 | 3 | 6 | 78 | −72 | 0 | Pools for 5th–8th places |

Updated to match(es) played on 1 November 2015. Source: Worldkorfball.org

November 6, 1978
| November 6, 1978 | Belgium | 26–2 | Luxembourg | Nuenen |

November 6, 1978
| November 6, 1978 | Papua New Guinea | 3–16 | Great Britain | Nuenen |

November 7, 1978
| November 7, 1978 | Luxembourg | 1–28 | Great Britain | Nuenen |

November 7, 1978
| November 7, 1978 | Papua New Guinea | 5–23 | Belgium | Nuenen |

November 8, 1978
| November 8, 1978 | Luxembourg | 3–24 | Papua New Guinea | Nuenen |

November 8, 1978
| November 8, 1978 | Belgium | 21–3 | Great Britain | Nuenen |

== Second round ==
=== 5th–8th places ===
November 10, 1978
| November 10, 1978 | Spain | 12–7 | Papua New Guinea | Amsterdam |

November 10, 1978
| November 10, 1978 | United States | 18–1 | Luxembourg | Amsterdam |

=== 7th–8th places ===
November 11, 1978
| November 11, 1978 | Papua New Guinea | 12–3 | Luxembourg | Amsterdam |

=== 5th–6th places ===
November 11, 1978
| November 11, 1978 | Spain | 7–11 | United States | Amsterdam |

=== Semi-finals ===
November 10, 1978
| November 10, 1978 | Netherlands | 23–6 | Great Britain | Amsterdam |

November 10, 1978
| November 10, 1978 | West Germany | 3–24 | Belgium | Amsterdam |

== Bronze medal match ==
November 11, 1978
| November 11, 1978 | Great Britain | 14–14 (ET)15–20 | West Germany | Amsterdam |

== Final ==
November 11, 1978
| November 11, 1978 | Netherlands | 10–10 (ET)14–13 | Belgium | Amsterdam |

== Final standings ==
Team
| 1 Netherlands |
| 2 Belgium |
| 3 West Germany |
| 4 Great Britain |
| 5 United States |
| 6 Spain |
| 7 Papua New Guinea |
| 8 Luxembourg |
