= Sweden national korfball team =

National sports team

Sweden
- Association: Svenska Korfballförbundet (SKF)
- IKF membership: 2002
- IKF code: SWE (Sweden)
- IKF rank: 25 (Nov 2012)

European Bowl
- Appearances: 2
- First appearance: 2007
- Best result: 4th (west), 2009
- http://www.korfball.se/

The Sweden national korfball team is managed by the Svenska Korfballförbundet (SKF), representing Sweden in korfball international competitions.

== Tournament history ==
European Bowl
Year	Championship	Host	Classification
2007	2nd European Bowl	Luxembourg	6th place (West)
2009	3rd European Bowl	Luxembourg (West)	4th place (West)

== Current squad ==
National team in the 2009 European Bowl

- Carola Bobic
- Selena Dinsbach
- Johanna Fredman
- Juliette De Gooijer-Stam
- Lina Leufven
- Bjorn Ter Bruggen
- Marco Leons
- Fredrik Lindberg
- Richard Nyberg
- Pierre Vergonet
- David Winks
- Coach: Atte Van Haastrecht

National team in the 2007 European Bowl

- Lina Leufven
- Carola Bobic
- Juliette Stam
- Emma Henningsson
- Hanna Carlsso
- Angelika Gustavsso
- Heather Main
- David Winks
- Stefan Henningsson
- Frederic Mangematin
- Pierre Vergonet
- Robert Enskog
- Maitham Fateh
- Fredrik Lindberg
- Coach: Atte Van Haastrecht
