= 1995 Korfball World Championship =

Tournament details
- Host country: India
- City: New Delhi
- Dates: November 1995
- Teams: 12
- Venue: 1 (in 1 host city)

Final positions
- Champions: Netherlands (4th title)
- Runners-up: Belgium
- Third place: Portugal
- Fourth place: Australia

The 5th Korfball World Championship was held in New Delhi (India) in November 1995, with the participation of 12 national teams.

== First round ==
Pool A
Team	Pts	Pld	W	D	L	GF	GA
Belgium	4	2	2	0	0	67	22
Portugal	2	2	1	0	1	40	32
India	0	2	0	0	2	16	69

Belgium	41–10	India
India	6–28	Portugal
Portugal	12–26	Belgium

Pool B
Team	Pts	Pld	W	D	L	GF	GA
Australia	4	2	2	0	0	30	26
Germany	2	2	1	0	1	30	27
Armenia	0	2	0	0	2	29	36

Germany	11–13	Australia
Australia	17–15	Armenia
Armenia	14–19	Germany

Pool C
Team	Pts	Pld	W	D	L	GF	GA
Chinese Taipei	4	2	2	0	0	48	19
Great Britain	2	2	1	0	1	20	31
Slovakia	0	2	0	0	2	16	34

Chinese Taipei	22–11	Slovakia
Slovakia	5–12	Great Britain
Great Britain	8–26	Chinese Taipei

Pool D
Team	Pts	Pld	W	D	L	GF	GA
Netherlands	4	2	2	0	0	64	18
Czech Republic	2	2	1	0	1	24	30
South Africa	0	2	0	0	2	16	56

Netherlands	39–11	South Africa
South Africa	5–17	Czech Republic
Czech Republic	7–25	Netherlands

== Intermediate round ==
Teams finishing second and third in the group stage had to play the intermediate round to determine whether they qualified for the quarter finals, or had to play the 9-12th place playoff.

Intermediate round
Great Britain	21–12	South Africa
Czech Republic	22–11	Slovakia
Portugal	20–12	Armenia
Germany	28–11	India

== Final round ==
Quarter finals
Belgium	14–7	Czech Republic
Australia	15–11	Great Britain
Chinese Taipei	11–16	Portugal
Netherlands	28–12	Germany
9–12 places
South Africa	10–20	Armenia
Slovakia	14–10	India

Semifinals
1–4 places
Belgium	28–4	Australia
Portugal	13–28	Netherlands
5–8 places
Czech Republic	11–18	Chinese Taipei
Great Britain	14–15	Germany

Finals
11–12 places
South Africa	17–14	India
9–10 places
Armenia	22–20	Slovakia
7–8 places
Czech Republic	12–10	Great Britain
5–6 places
Chinese Taipei	12–8	Germany
3–4 places
Australia	11–13	Portugal
FINAL
Belgium	13–21	Netherlands

== Final ranking ==
1. Netherlands
2. Belgium
3. Portugal
4. Australia
5. Chinese Taipei
6. Germany
7. Czech Republic
8. Great Britain
9. Armenia
10. Slovakia
11. South Africa
12. India

== See also ==
- Korfball World Championship
- International Korfball Federation
