= 1984 Korfball World Championship =

1984 European Korfball A-Championship
Tournament details
- Host country: Belgium
- City: Antwerp, Louvain la Neuve, Hasselt and Ghent
- Dates: 24 to 27 April 1984
- Teams: 8
- Venue(s): 4 (in 4 host cities)

Final positions
- Champions: Netherlands (2nd title)
- Runners-up: Belgium
- Third place: West Germany
- Fourth place: Great Britain

The 1984 Korfball World Championship was the second edition of the major international korfball competition. It was held in Belgium on April 24–27, in the cities of Antwerp, Louvain la Neuve, Hasselt and Ghent. The Netherlands defeated Belgium at the final by 11–9.

== Pool matches ==
Legend

Pts = Points; P = Played games W = Win (2p); L = Lost	F = Korfs favour A = Korfs against D = Difference korfs (KF-KA)

POOL A	Pts	P	W	L	F	A	D
Netherlands	6	3	3	0	81	32	+49
Great Britain	4	3	2	1	32	37	−5
United States	2	3	1	2	32	40	−8
France	0	3	0	3	30	66	−36

April 24, 1984
April 24, 1984	Netherlands	21–7	Great Britain	Antwerp

April 24, 1984
April 24, 1984	France	8–13	United States	Louvain la Neuve

April 25, 1984
April 25, 1984	Netherlands	21–9	United States	Antwerp

April 25, 1984
April 25, 1984	France	6–14	Great Britain	Antwerp

April 26, 1984
April 26, 1984	Great Britain	11–10	United States	Antwerp

April 26, 1984
April 26, 1984	Netherlands	39–16	France	Hasselt

POOL B	Pts	P	W	L	F	A	D
Belgium	6	3	3	0	72	18	+54
West Germany	4	3	2	1	34	26	−8
Spain	2	3	1	2	13	36	−23
Australia	0	3	0	3	24	63	−29

April 24, 1984
April 24, 1984	Spain	6–11	West Germany	Antwerp

April 24, 1984
April 24, 1984	Belgium	38–13	Australia	Louvain la Neuve

April 25, 1984
April 25, 1984	Belgium	14–4	West Germany	Ghent

April 25, 1984
April 25, 1984	Australia	5–6	Spain	Ghent

April 26, 1984
April 26, 1984	Belgium	20–1	Spain	Antwerp

April 26, 1984
April 26, 1984	West Germany	19–6	Australia	Antwerp

== Final round ==
=== 7th–8th places ===
April 27, 1984
April 27, 1984	Australia	8–7	France	Ghent

=== 5th–6th places ===
April 27, 1984

Spain
8–8*
United States
Ghent

- (Spain wins after penalty Shoot-out)

=== Bronze medal match ===
April 27, 1984
April 27, 1984	West Germany	7–5	Great Britain	Ghent

=== Final ===
April 27, 1984
April 27, 1984	Netherlands	11–9	Belgium	Ghent

== Final standings ==
Team
1 Netherlands
2 Belgium
3 West Germany
4 Great Britain
5 Spain
6 United States
7 Australia
8 France
