= European Korfball Championship =

- Founded: 1998
- Region: International (IKF)
- Teams: 8 (finals)
- Current champions: Netherlands (9th title)
- Most championships: Netherlands (9 titles)
- Website: International Korfball Federation
- 2024 IKF European Korfball A-Championship

European Korfball Championship or European Korfball A-Championship is a korfball competition for European national teams organized by the International Korfball Federation. It was played every four years from 1998 until 2014 and then moved to a tournament every two years, starting from 2016. The number of participated teams has varied between 8 and 16. The Netherlands national korfball team has won each edition.

== History ==
From 2005 until 2013, the IKF organized the Korfball European Bowl for nations which had failed to qualify for the European Korfball Championship. In these tournaments it was possible to win places for the next European Korfball Championships and sometimes also IKF World Korfball Championships. The tournament was abolished in 2013 as the number of teams in the European Korfball Championship had risen to 16, however the IKF decided to bring this number down again to 8 by 2018 and to create a European Korfball B-Championship similar to the European Bowl but with a promotion/relegation system to be put into place between both championships. The European Korfball B-Championship were held in 2018, 2021 and 2024 before again being abolished as the European Korfball Championship was expanded back to 16 teams for the 2026 edition.

== Results ==
European Korfball Championship
	Year	Host	Final			Third place match			#Number of teams
	Year	Host	Champion	Score	Second place	Third place	Score	Fourth place	#Number of teams
I	1998	Portugal	Netherlands	26–13	Belgium	Portugal	16–13	Czech Republic	8
II	2002	Catalonia	Netherlands	15–9	Czech Republic	Belgium	29–9	Germany	10
III	2006	Hungary	Netherlands	25–14	Belgium	Czech Republic	16–15	Germany	8
IV	2010	Netherlands	Netherlands	25–21	Belgium	Czech Republic	18–11	Germany	16
V	2014	Portugal	Netherlands	32–20	Belgium	Portugal	22–14	England	16
VI	2016	Netherlands	Netherlands	27–14	Belgium	Catalonia	16–12	Portugal	10
VII	2018	Netherlands	Netherlands	21–8	Germany	Portugal	20–19	Belgium	8 (+2)
VIII	2021	Belgium	Netherlands	21–17	Belgium	Germany	13–11	England	8
IX	2024	Catalonia	Netherlands	21–15	Belgium	Germany	18–13	Catalonia	8
X	2026	Czech Republic	Netherlands	27–12	Belgium	Czech Republic	20–12	Germany	16

1. In 2018, mid-way through the tournament, an intermediate round was held in which two teams from the B-Championship played off against two teams from the A-Championship, with the winners continuing the tournament in the A-Championship.

== Debut of teams ==
Year	Debutants	Total
1998	Belgium; Czech Republic; Germany; Great Britain; Netherlands; Slovakia; Poland; Portugal	8
2002	Catalonia; Hungary	2
2006	Russia	1
2010	England; Ireland; Scotland; Serbia; Turkey; Wales	6
2014		0
2016		0
2018		0
2021		0
2024		0
2026	Switzerland	1
Total		18

2. Only participation in the A-Championship is included. In 2018, France did play the B-Championship held at the same time and location.

== Medals summary ==
Rank	Nation	Gold	Silver	Bronze	Total
1	Netherlands	10	0	0	10
2	Belgium	0	8	1	9
3	Czech Republic	0	1	3	4
4	Germany	0	1	2	3
5	Portugal	0	0	3	3
6	Catalonia	0	0	1	1
Totals (6 entries)		10	10	10	30

== Comprehensive team results by tournament ==
Legend

- 1st – Champions
- 2nd – Runners-up
- 3rd – Third place
- 4th – Fourth place
- Q – Qualified for upcoming tournament
- – Hosts

The number of teams in each finals tournament (in brackets) are shown for each tournament.

Team (18)	(Portugal) 1998 (8)	(Catalonia) 2002 (10)	(Hungary) 2006 (8)	(Netherlands) 2010 (16)	(Portugal) 2014 (16)	(Netherlands) 2016 (10)	(Netherlands) 2018 (8+2)	(Belgium) 2021 (8)	(Catalonia) 2024 (8)	(Czech Republic) 2026 (16)	Times qualified
Belgium	2nd	3rd	2nd	2nd	2nd	2nd	4th	2nd	2nd	2nd	10
Catalonia	•	7th	6th	5th	9th	3rd	6th	8th	4th	6th	9
Czech Republic	4th	2nd	3rd	3rd	5th	7th	5th	7th	5th	3rd	10
England (Note: Includes three appearances as Great Britain)	5th	5th	5th	6th	4th	6th	7th	4th	7th	5th	10
Germany	6th	4th	4th	4th	10th	5th	2nd	3rd	3rd	4th	10
Hungary	•	8th	8th	10th	7th	•	8th	6th	8th	10th	8
Netherlands	1st	1st	1st	1st	1st	1st	1st	1st	1st	1st	10
Poland	7th	10th	•	9th	8th	9th	•	•	•	9th	6
Portugal	3rd	6th	•	7th	3rd	4th	3rd	5th	6th	7th	9
Ireland	•	•	•	12th	12th	•	•	•	•	14th	3
Russia	•	•	7th	8th	6th	8th	•	•	•	•	4
Scotland	Part of Great Britain			15th	11th	•	•	•	•	15th	3
Serbia	•	•	•	14th	13th	•	•	•	•	13th	3
Slovakia	8th	9th	•	13th	14th	•	•	•	•	11th	5
Switzerland	•	•	•	•	•	•	•	•	•	16th	1
Turkey	•	•	•	16th	15th	10th	•	•	•	8th	4
Wales	Part of Great Britain			11th	16th	•	•	•	•	12th	3
Team (18)	(Portugal) 1998 (8)	(Catalonia) 2002 (10)	(Hungary) 2006 (8)	(Netherlands) 2010 (16)	(Portugal) 2014 (16)	(Netherlands) 2016 (10)	(Netherlands) 2018 (8+2)	(Belgium) 2021 (8)	(Catalonia) 2024 (8)	(Czech Republic) 2026 (16)	Times qualified

== See also ==
- International Korfball Federation
- European Korfball B-Championship
- Korfball European Bowl
