= 2006 European Korfball Championship =

2006 European Korfball A-Championship
Tournament details
- Host country: Hungary
- City: Budapest
- Dates: 16 to 22 April 2006
- Teams: 8
- Venue: 1 (in 1 host city)

Final positions
- Champions: Netherlands (3rd title)
- Runners-up: Belgium
- Third place: Czech Republic
- Fourth place: Germany

The 2006 European Korfball Championship was held in Budapest (Hungary) with 8 national teams in competition, from April 16 to 22.

== First round ==
POOL A	Pts	P	W	L	PF	PA	DP
Belgium	9	3	3	0	0	65	31
Czech Republic	6	3	2	0	1	45	47
Hungary	3	3	1	0	2	40	56
Catalonia	0	3	0	0	3	29	45

POOL B	Pts	P	W	L	PF	PA	DP
Netherlands	9	3	3	0	0	72	23
Germany	3	3	1	0	2	30	46
Russia	3	3	1	0	2	35	51
Great Britain	3	3	1	0	2	28	45

04/16/06	Czech Republic	10–9	Catalonia
04/16/06	Hungary	8–24	Belgium
04/17/06	Belgium	23–16	Czech Republic
04/17/06	Hungary	17–13	Catalonia
04/18/06	Belgium	18–7	Catalonia
04/18/06	Hungary	15–19	Czech Republic

04/16/06	Germany	10–12	Russia
04/16/06	Netherlands	19–6	Great Britain
04/17/06	Netherlands	27–6	Germany
04/17/06	Great Britain	15–12	Russia
04/18/06	Netherlands	26–11	Russia
04/18/06	Germany	14–7	Great Britain

== Final round ==
Semi-finals
April z20
Belgium	17
Germany	10
April 20
Czech Republic	10
Netherlands	28

Final
April 22
Belgium	14
Netherlands	25
Third place
April 22
Germany	15
Czech Republic	16

5th-8th places

04/20/06 / Catalonia / 17–14 / Russia; 04/20/06 / Hungary / 6–9 / Great Britain

Semifinals

04/20/06 / Belgium / 17-10 / Germany; 04/20/06 / Czech Republic / 10–28 / Netherlands

Finals matches

04/22/06	Russia	21-13	Hungary
04/22/06	Catalonia	13–14	Great Britain
04/22/06	Czech Republic	16-15	Germany
04/22/06	Netherlands	25–14	Belgium

== Final standings ==
Final standings
1	Netherlands
2	Belgium
3	Czech Republic
4	Germany
5	Great Britain
6	Catalonia
7	Russia
8	Hungary

== See also ==
- European Korfball Championship
- International Korfball Federation
