= 1998 European Korfball Championship =

1998 European Korfball A-Championship
Tournament details
- Host country: Portugal
- City: Estoril
- Dates: 16 to 19 April 1998
- Teams: 8

Final positions
- Champions: Netherlands (1st title)
- Runners-up: Belgium
- Third place: Portugal
- Fourth place: Czech Republic

Tournament statistics
- Matches played: 16
- Goals scored: 531 (33.19 per match)

The 1998 European Korfball Championship was held in Estoril (Portugal) with 8 national teams in competition, from 16–19 April.

== First round ==
POOL A	Pts	P	W	L	PF	PA	DP
Netherlands	9	3	3	0	87	25	+62
Czech Republic	6	3	2	1	51	56	-5
Germany	3	3	1	2	42	68	-26
Slovakia	0	3	0	3	35	66	-31

POOL B	Pts	P	W	L	PF	PA	DP
Belgium	9	3	3	0	79	40	+39
Portugal	6	3	2	1	67	53	+14
Great Britain	3	3	1	2	50	60	-10
Poland	0	3	0	3	40	83	-43

16-04-1998	Germany	17–13	Slovakia
16-04-1998	Netherlands	27–7	Czech Republic
17-04-1998	Czech Republic	19–11	Slovakia
17-04-1998	Netherlands	30–7	Germany
18-04-1998	Netherlands	30–11	Slovakia
18-04-1998	Germany	18–25	Czech Republic

16-04-1998	Belgium	36–14	Poland
16-04-1998	Portugal	24–20	Great Britain
17-04-1998	Poland	13–19	Great Britain
17-04-1998	Belgium	20–15	Portugal
18-04-1998	Portugal	28–13	Poland
18-04-1998	Belgium	23–11	Great Britain

== Final round ==
19-04-1998

7th-8th	Poland	18-13	Slovakia
5th-6th	Great Britain	23–17	Germany
3rd-4th	Czech Republic	13-16	Portugal
Final	Netherlands	26–13	Belgium

== Final standings ==
Final standings
1	Netherlands
2	Belgium
3	Portugal
4	Czech Republic
5	Great Britain
6	Germany
7	Poland
8	Slovakia

== See also ==
- European Korfball Championship
- International Korfball Federation
