= France national korfball team =

France
- Association: UFOLEP National Korfball Committee
- IKF code: FRA (France)
- IKF rank: 29 (Nov.2025)

World Championships
- Appearances: 2
- First appearance: 1984
- Best result: 8th, 1984

European Bowl
- Appearances: 4
- First appearance: 2007
- Best result: 3rd place – 2007, 2016

The France national korfball team is managed by the UFOLEP National Korfball Committee, representing France in korfball international competitions.

== Tournament history ==
World Championships
Year	Championship	Host	Classification
1984	2nd World Championship	Antwerp (Belgium)	8th place
1987	3rd World Championship	Makkum (The Netherlands)	12th place

European B-Championship
Year	Championship	Host	Classification
2018	1st European B-Championship	Netherlands	5th place

European Bowl
Year	Championship	Host	Classification
2007	2nd European Bowl	Luxembourg	3rd place
2009	3rd European Bowl	Luxembourg (West)	6th place (West)
2013	4th European Bowl	Papendrecht (Netherlands)	4th place (East)
2016	5th European Bowl	France	3rd place (West)

== Current squad ==
Participation in the World Beach Korfball Championships in Nador, Morocco in August 2022.

From 31 October to 5 November 2022 qualifying tournament for the world championships in Antalia, Turkey.

Équipe :

- Clément Chareyre n°10
- Mélanie Bourgaud n°6
- Nicolas Chareyre n°16
- Coralie Masclet n°5
- Guillaume Godorecci n°4
- Marie Perrier n°9
- Kevin Godorecci n°11
- Johanna Giordanni n°2
- Rémi Bonnard n°13
- Léa Mondon n°7
- Rudy Courbon n°8
- Morgane Parmentier n°15
- Baptiste Bernou n°14
- Céline Caltagirone n°3

National team in the 2009 European Bowl

- Marlene Damin
- Adeline Garde
- Amadine Leroy
- Lauriane Lopez
- Aude Marhin
- Gaelle Rupil
- Audrey Sabot
- Jeremy Bancel
- Ludovic Bancel
- Clement Chareyre
- Nicolas Chareyre
- David Dupuy
- Florian Masson
- Remi Miguel
- Coach: Denis Dancert

National team in the 2007 European Bowl

- Laetitia Bonnet
- Marie-Laure Mazenod
- Adeline Garde
- Audrey Sabot
- Angélique Berthet
- Audrey Genest
- Marlene Damin
- Nathalie Domarchi
- Simon Degache
- Denis Dancert
- Frederic Mazenod
- Clément Chareyre
- Guillaume Damin
- Ludovic Bancel
- Nicolas Chareyre
- David Dupuy
- Coach: Béatrice Rouchon
