= 2024 IKF European Korfball A-Championship =

2024 European Korfball A-Championship
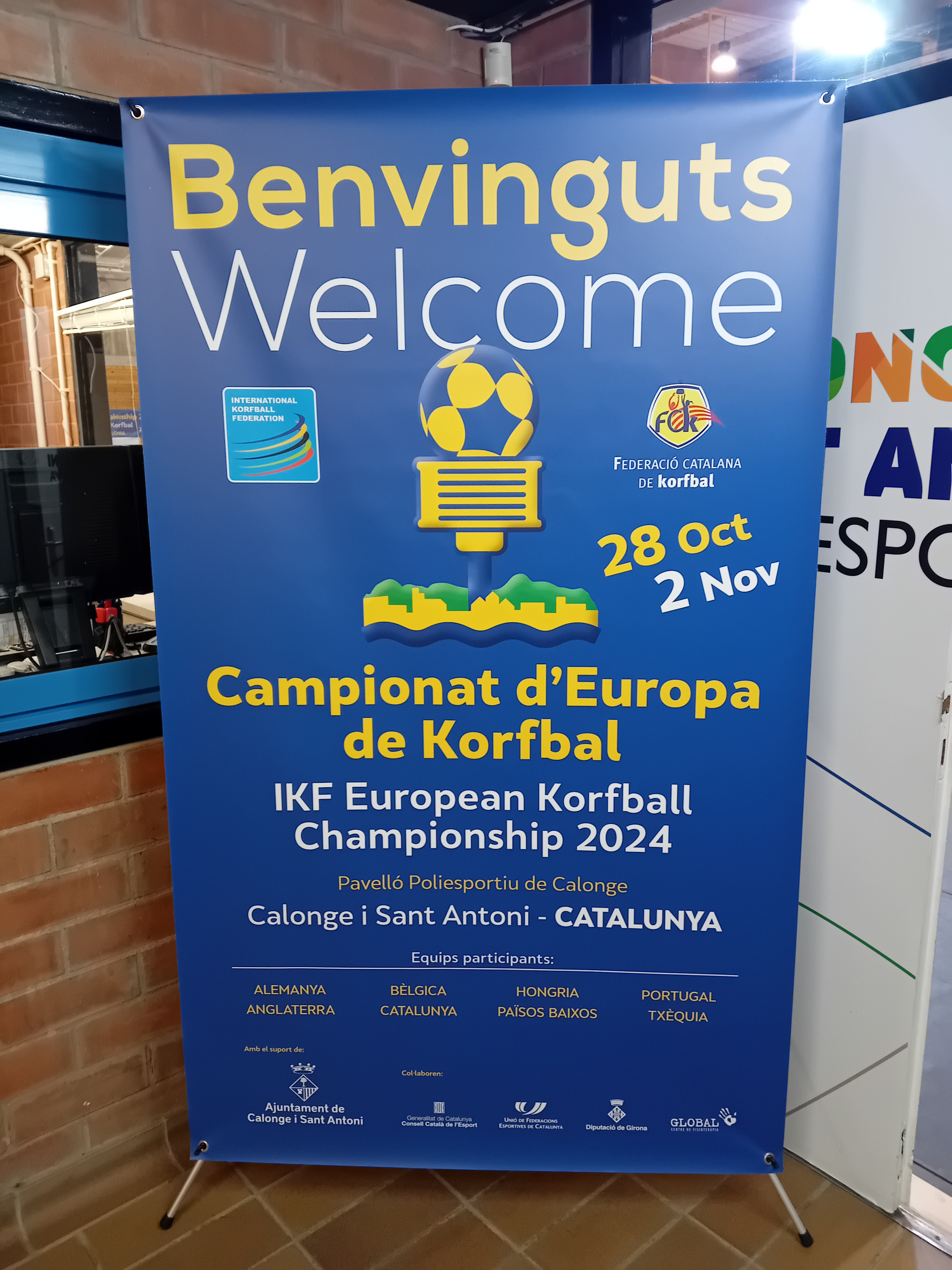

Tournament details
- Host country: Catalonia
- City: Calonge i Sant Antoni
- Dates: 28 October to 2 November 2024
- Teams: 8
- Venue: 1

Final positions
- Champions: Netherlands (9th title)
- Runners-up: Belgium
- Third place: Germany
- Fourth place: Catalonia

Tournament statistics
- Matches played: 20
- Goals scored: 788 (39.4 per match)

The 2024 European Korfball A-Championship was held in Catalonia from 28 October to 2 November 2024. Matches were played in Calonge i Sant Antoni. It was the third edition where the European Korfball Championship was split into an A-Championship and a B-Championship.

== Qualified teams ==
The best 8 European teams in the 2023 IKF World Korfball Championship directly qualified for the 2024 European A-Championships: Netherlands, Belgium, Czech Republic, Germany, Portugal, England, Hungary and Catalonia.

== Venue ==
All matches were played at Pavelló Municipal d'Esports in Calonge i Sant Antoni.

== Group stage ==
=== Group A ===
| Pos | Team | Pld | W | OTW | OTL | L | GF | GA | GD | Pts |
|---|---|---|---|---|---|---|---|---|---|---|
| 1 | Netherlands | 3 | 3 | 0 | 0 | 0 | 114 | 31 | +83 | 9 |
| 2 | Germany | 3 | 2 | 0 | 0 | 1 | 52 | 68 | −16 | 6 |
| 3 | Portugal | 3 | 1 | 0 | 0 | 2 | 56 | 61 | −5 | 3 |
| 4 | Hungary | 3 | 0 | 0 | 0 | 3 | 25 | 87 | −62 | 0 |

Source: IKF

28 October 2024
14:00

| Netherlands | 34–14 | Portugal |
|---|---|---|
| | Report |

28 October 2024
18:30

| Germany | 23–10 | Hungary |
|---|---|---|
| | Report |

29 October 2024
14:15

| Portugal | 28-7 | Hungary |
|---|---|---|
| | Report |

29 October 2024
16:00

| Netherlands | 44–9 | Germany |
|---|---|---|
| | Report |

30 October 2024
14:15

| Hungary | 8–36 | Netherlands |
|---|---|---|
| | Report |

30 October 2024
17:45

| Germany | 20–14 | Portugal |
|---|---|---|
| | Report |

=== Group B ===
| Pos | Team | Pld | W | OTW | OTL | L | GF | GA | GD | Pts |
|---|---|---|---|---|---|---|---|---|---|---|
| 1 | Belgium | 3 | 3 | 0 | 0 | 0 | 100 | 27 | +73 | 9 |
| 2 | Catalonia | 3 | 2 | 0 | 0 | 1 | 52 | 71 | −19 | 6 |
| 3 | Czech Republic | 3 | 1 | 0 | 0 | 2 | 42 | 60 | −18 | 3 |
| 4 | England | 3 | 0 | 0 | 0 | 3 | 40 | 76 | −36 | 0 |

Source: IKF

28 October 2024
15:45

| Belgium | 32–10 | Czech Republic |
|---|---|---|
| | Report |

28 October 2024
19:45

| Catalonia | 24–23 | England |
|---|---|---|
| | Report |

29 October 2024
17:45

| Czech Republic | 19–10 | England |
|---|---|---|
| | Report |

29 October 2024
19:30

| Catalonia | 10–35 | Belgium |
|---|---|---|
| | Report |

30 October 2024
16:00

| England | 7–33 | Belgium |
|---|---|---|
| | Report |

30 October 2024
19:30

| Catalonia | 18–13 | Czech Republic |
|---|---|---|
| | Report |

== Knockout stage ==
Semi-finals
1 November – Calonge i Sant Antoni
Catalonia | 16
Netherlands | 53
1 November – Calonge i Sant Antoni
Belgium | 28
Germany | 9

Final
2 November – Calonge i Sant Antoni
Belgium | 15
Netherlands | 21
Third place play-off
2 November – Calonge i Sant Antoni
Catalonia | 13
Germany | 18

=== Classification 5th-8th place ===
5th-8th place
1 November – Calonge i Sant Antoni
Portugal | 17
England | 11
1 November – Calonge i Sant Antoni
Czech Republic | 23
Hungary | 14

5th place
2 November – Calonge i Sant Antoni
Portugal | 15
Czech Republic | 18
7th place
2 November – Calonge i Sant Antoni
England | 24
Hungary | 12

== Final standing ==
| Rank | Team |
|---|---|
| 1st place, gold medalist(s) | Netherlands |
| 2nd place, silver medalist(s) | Belgium |
| 3rd place, bronze medalist(s) | Germany |
| 4 | Catalonia |
| 5 | Czech Republic |
| 6 | Portugal |
| 7 | England |
| 8 | Hungary |
