= Korfball European Bowl =

The European Bowl was the Korfball European Championship "B", played by the countries that have not qualified for the European Korfball Championship. The best teams of these tournaments often won the right to participate in the next European Korfball Championship and/or Korfball World Championship.

== History ==
In 2005, the International Korfball Federation named the trophy for the European Bowl championship after Jan Hanekroot, one of its longest serving development officers and promoters, who died earlier that year.

The tournament was last held in 2013, when the International Korfball Federation decided to create a new system which will be in force from 2018, reducing the number of teams taking part in the European Korfball Championship from 16 to 8 but splitting the championship up in two levels with a relegation/promotion system to be carried out between the so-called "A-Championships" (the current European Korfball Championship) and the "B-Championships". The European Bowl therefore ceases to exist and will be replaced by the "B-Championships", to be first held in 2018.

== Results ==
Korfball European Bowl
| | Year | | Host | Champion | Second place | Third place |
| I | 2005 | Details | Catalonia | Catalonia | Russia | Portugal |
| II | 2007 | Details | Luxembourg and Serbia | Slovakia | Wales | Serbia and France |
| III | 2009 | Details | Luxembourg (West); Slovakia (East) | Wales; Slovakia | Scotland; Serbia | Ireland; Turkey |
| IV | 2013 | Details | Slovakia (Centre); Netherlands (East) | Slovakia; Turkey | Serbia; Wales | Scotland; Ireland |
| V | 2016 | Details | France (West); Slovakia (East) | Turkey; Germany | Catalonia; Poland | France; Slovakia |

== Medals summary ==
| Rank | Nation | Gold | Silver | Bronze | Total |
|---|---|---|---|---|---|
| 1 | Slovakia | 3 | 0 | 1 | 4 |
| 2 | Turkey | 2 | 0 | 1 | 3 |
| 3 | Wales | 1 | 2 | 0 | 3 |
| 4 | Catalonia | 1 | 1 | 0 | 2 |
| 5 | Germany | 1 | 0 | 0 | 1 |
| 6 | Serbia | 0 | 2 | 1 | 3 |
| 7 | Scotland | 0 | 1 | 1 | 2 |
| 8 | Poland | 0 | 1 | 0 | 1 |
| 8 | Russia | 0 | 1 | 0 | 1 |
| 10 | France | 0 | 0 | 2 | 2 |
| 10 | Ireland | 0 | 0 | 2 | 2 |
| 12 | Portugal | 0 | 0 | 1 | 1 |
| Totals (12 entries) | | 8 | 8 | 9 | 25 |

== See also ==
- International Korfball Federation
- European Korfball Championship
- European Korfball B-Championship
