= 2010 European Korfball Championship =

2010 European Korfball A-Championship
Tournament details
- Host country: Netherlands
- Dates: 22 to 31 October 2010
- Teams: 16
- Venues: 5 (in 5 host cities)

Final positions
- Champions: Netherlands (4th title)
- Runners-up: Belgium
- Third place: Czech Republic
- Fourth place: Germany

The 2010 European Korfball Championship was held in the Netherlands from October 22 to 31, with 16 national teams in competition.

The tournament also served as a European qualifier for the 2011 Korfball World Championship, with the top nine nations qualifying for the world championship.

== First round ==
The first round was played in Leeuwarden (A), Tilburg (B), Almelo (C) and The Hague (D).

POOL A	Pts	P	W	L	PF	PA	DP
Netherlands	9	3	3	0	122	24	+98
Germany	6	3	2	1	65	60	+5
Hungary	3	3	1	2	41	78	-37
Serbia	0	3	0	3	37	103	-66

POOL B	Pts	P	W	L	PF	PA	DP
Belgium	9	3	3	0	102	31	+71
Catalonia	6	3	2	1	70	41	+29
Poland	3	3	1	2	31	72	-41
Scotland	0	3	0	3	27	86	-59

10/10/22	Hungary	22–16	Serbia
10/10/22	Netherlands	36–8	Germany
10/10/23	Germany	36–13	Serbia
10/10/23	Netherlands	41–8	Hungary
10/10/24	Germany	21–11	Hungary
10/10/24	Netherlands	45–8	Serbia

10/10/22	Catalonia	35–7	Scotland
10/10/22	Belgium	38–10	Poland
10/10/23	Poland	16–11	Scotland
10/10/23	Belgium	29–12	Catalonia
10/10/24	Catalonia	23–5	Poland
10/10/24	Belgium	35–9	Scotland

POOL C	Pts	P	W	L	PF	PA	DP
Czech Republic	9	3	3	0	85	33	+52
Portugal	6	2	2	1	67	38	+29
Wales	3	3	1	2	33	75	-42
Turkey	0	2	0	2	31	70	-39

POOL D	Pts	P	W	L	PF	PA	DP
Russia	9	3	3	0	65	50	+15
England	6	3	2	1	75	38	+37
Ireland	2	3	1	2	32	53	-21
Slovakia	1	3	0	3	33	64	-31

10/10/22	Portugal	20–9	Turkey
10/10/22	Czech Republic	32–7	Wales
10/10/23	Portugal	30–9	Wales
10/10/23	Czech Republic	33–9	Turkey
10/10/24	Wales	17–13	Turkey
10/10/24	Czech Republic	20–17	Portugal

10/10/22	England	24–6	Ireland
10/10/22	Russia	23–14	Slovakia
10/10/23	England	27–6	Slovakia
10/10/23	Russia	16–12	Ireland
10/10/24	Slovakia	13–14(gg)	Ireland
10/10/24	Russia	26–24	England

== Second round ==
Matches were played at Rotterdam.

=== Quarterfinals ===
- Best 2 teams in every pool of the first round, carrying forward their match result.

POOL E	Pts	P	W	L	PF	PA	DP
Netherlands	9	3	3	0	109	26	+83
Germany	6	3	2	1	49	72	-23
Russia	3	3	1	2	63	89	-26
England	0	3	0	3	41	75	-34

POOL F	Pts	P	W	L	PF	PA	DP
Belgium	9	3	3	0	96	43	+53
Czech Republic	5	3	2	1	53	69	-16
Portugal	3	3	1	2	58	64	-6
Catalonia	1	3	0	3	41	72	-31

10/10/26	Germany	26–25	Russia
10/10/26	Netherlands	34–6	England
10/10/27	Germany	15–11	England
10/10/27	Netherlands	39–12	Russia

10/10/26	Catalonia	17–18(gg)	Czech Republic
10/10/26	Belgium	32–16	Portugal
10/10/27	Catalonia	12–25	Portugal
10/10/27	Belgium	35–15	Czech Republic

=== 9th to 16th places ===
- Last 2 teams in every pool of the first round, carrying forward their match result.

POOL G	Pts	P	W	L	PF	PA	DP
Hungary	9	3	3	0	53	37	+16
Ireland	5	3	2	1	43	37	+6
Slovakia	4	3	1	2	36	44	-8
Serbia	0	3	0	3	39	53	-14

POOL H	Pts	P	W	L	PF	PA	DP
Poland	9	3	3	0	56	30	+26
Wales	6	3	2	1	47	45	+2
Turkey	3	3	1	2	35	52	-17
Scotland	0	3	0	3	38	49	-11

10/10/26	Hungary	17–8	Slovakia
10/10/26	Serbia	10–16	Ireland
10/10/27	Hungary	14–13	Ireland
10/10/27	Serbia	13–15	Slovakia

10/10/26	Poland	23–7	Turkey
10/10/26	Scotland	15–18	Wales
10/10/27	Poland	17–12	Wales
10/10/27	Scotland	12–15	Turkey

== Final round ==
=== 13th-16th places ===
Matches were played at Topsportcentrum (Rotterdam).

13th-16th places
October 28
Slovakia	20
Scotland	15
October 28
Serbia	23
Turkey	12

13th-14th places match
October 30
Slovakia	21
Serbia	14
15th-16th places match
October 30
Scotland	16
Turkey	12

=== 9th-12th places ===
Matches were played at Topsportcentrum (Rotterdam).

9th-12th places
October 28
Hungary	18
Wales	14
October 28
Ireland	18
Poland	21

9th-10th places match
October 30
Hungary	19
Poland	20 g.g.
11th-12th places match
October 30
Wales	11
Ireland	10

=== 5th-8th places ===
Matches were played at AHOY sportshall (Rotterdam).

5th-8th places
October 29
Russia	15
Catalonia	19
October 29
England	17
Portugal	15

5th-6th places match
October 31
Catalonia	21
England	16
7th-8th places match
October 31
Russia	15
Portugal	23

=== Semifinals ===
Matches were played at AHOY sportshall (Rotterdam).

Semifinals
October 29
Germany	11
Belgium	34
October 29
Czech Republic	11
Netherlands	36

Final
October 31
Belgium	21
Netherlands	25
3rd-4th places match
October 31
Germany	11
Czech Republic	18

== Final standing ==
Key
Qualified for the 2011 IKF World Korfball Championship

Rank	Team
1st place, gold medalist(s)	Netherlands
2nd place, silver medalist(s)	Belgium
3rd place, bronze medalist(s)	Czech Republic
4	Germany
5	Catalonia
6	England
7	Portugal
8	Russia
9	Poland
10	Hungary
11	Wales
12	Ireland
13	Slovakia
14	Serbia
15	Scotland
16	Turkey
