= Russia national korfball team =

Russia
- Association: Russian Korfball Federation
- IKF membership: 1997
- IKF code: RUS (Russia)
- IKF rank: 47 (Feb. 2022)

World Championships
- Appearances: 2
- First appearance: 2007
- Best result: 6th place, 2007, 2011

World Games
- Appearances: 2
- First appearance: 2009
- Best result: 4th place

European Championships
- Appearances: 4
- First appearance: 2006
- Best result: 6th place, 2014

European Bowl
- Appearances: 1
- First appearance: 2005
- Best result: 2nd place, 2005
- корфбол.рф

The Russia national korfball team is managed by the Russian Korfball Federation (RKF), representing Russia in korfball international competitions.

In response to the 2022 Russian invasion of Ukraine, on 1 March 2022, the International Korfball Federation announced that the Russian Korfball Federation would not be invited until further notice to any international korfball competition. This implied effectively that no Russian athletes shall take part in any international korfball event. Furthermore, the Russian Korfball Federation shall not be eligible to bid for the hosting of any IKF event until further notice, and no IKF events were planned in Russia.

== Tournament history ==
World Championships
Year	Championship	Host	Classification
2007	8th World Championship	Brno (Czech Republic)	6th place
2011	9th World Championship	Shaoxing (China)	6th place
2015	10th World Championship	Antwerp (Belgium)	8th place

World Games
Year	Championship	Host	Classification
2009	8th World Games	Kaohsiung (Taiwan)	4th place
2013	9th World Games	Cali (Colombia)	6th place

European Championships
Year	Championship	Host	Classification
2006	3rd European Championship	Budapest (Hungary)	7th place
2010	4th European Championship	(Netherlands)	8th place
2014	5th European Championship	Maia (Portugal)	6th place
2016	6th European Championship	Dordrecht (Netherlands)	8th place

European Bowl
Year	Championship	Host	Classification
2005	1st European Bowl	Terrassa (Catalonia)	2nd place
