= Romania national korfball team =

Romania
- Association: Romanian Korfball Association
- IKF membership: 2003
- IKF code: ROM (Romania)
- IKF rank: 45 (Jan 2024)

European Bowl
- Appearances: 2
- First appearance: 2007
- Best result: 4th (east), 2007, 2009

The Romania national korfball team is managed by the Romanian Korfball Association (RKA), representing Romania in korfball international competitions.

== Tournament history ==
Korfball World Cup u 19
Year	Championship	Host	Classification
2015	2015 Korfball World Cup u 19	Netherlands-Leeuwarden	10th Place

== Current squad ==
National team in the U19 Korfball world cup 2015

- Bereczki Szidonia
- Kovacs Annamaria
- Szabo Angyalka
- Vajda Zsofia
- Gall Karla
- Samartean Carina
- Godri Szabi
- Nemeth Zoly
- Barabas Attila
- Levente Gabor
- Bondi Tamas
- Fekete Adam
- Ilovan Andrei (C)
- Cocis Alexandru
- Coach: Doboczi Matyas
