= 2011 IKF World Korfball Championship =

Tournament details
- Host country: China
- Dates: 27 October– 5 November (10 days)
- Teams: 16

Final positions
- Champions: Netherlands (8th title)
- Runners-up: Belgium
- Third place: Chinese Taipei
- Fourth place: Catalonia

Tournament statistics
- Matches played: 56
- Goals scored: 2,420 (43.21 per match)
- Top scorer(s): (Belgium) Bart Cleyman (Poland) Maciej Zak (49 goals)

The 9th Korfball World Championship was held in Shaoxing, China, on October 27 – November 5, 2011 with 16 national teams in competition.

== Teams ==
Pool A
Netherlands
Portugal
Germany
India

Pool B
Belgium
Russia
South Africa
Hong Kong

Pool C
England
Poland
Chinese Taipei
Australia

Pool D
Czech Republic
Catalonia
China
Wales

== Pool matches ==
Legend

Pts = Points
P = Played games
W = Win (3p)
w = win with golden goal/penalties (2p)
l = lost with golden goal/penalties (1p)
L = Lost

F = Korfs favour
A = Korfs against
D = Difference korfs (KF-KA)
GG = Match won by golden goal

POOL A	Pts	P	W	L	F	A	D
Netherlands	9	3	3	0	118	34	+84
Portugal	6	3	2	1	69	59	+10
Germany	3	3	1	2	46	59	−13
India	0	3	0	3	44	125	−81

October 27, 2011; 13:00
October 27, 2011; 13:00	Germany	25–19	India	Shaoxing
October 27, 2011; 13:00		Details		Shaoxing

October 27, 2011; 14:50
October 27, 2011; 14:50	Netherlands	34–13	Portugal	Shaoxing
October 27, 2011; 14:50		Details		Shaoxing

October 28, 2011; 15:50
October 28, 2011; 15:50	Netherlands	24–10	Germany	Shaoxing
October 28, 2011; 15:50		Details		Shaoxing

October 28, 2011; 17:40
October 28, 2011; 17:40	Portugal	40–14	India	Shaoxing
October 28, 2011; 17:40		Details		Shaoxing

October 29, 2011; 14:00
October 29, 2011; 14:00	Netherlands	60–11	India	Shaoxing
October 29, 2011; 14:00		Details		Shaoxing

October 29, 2011; 17:40
October 29, 2011; 17:40	Germany	11–16	Portugal	Shaoxing
October 29, 2011; 17:40		Details		Shaoxing

POOL B	Pts	P	W	L	F	A	D
Belgium	9	3	3	0	137	27	+110
Russia	6	3	2	1	79	61	+18
Hong Kong	3	3	1	2	46	101	−55
South Africa	0	3	0	3	31	104	−73

October 27, 2011; 11:30
October 27, 2011; 11:30	Russia	33–17	Hong Kong	Shaoxing
October 27, 2011; 11:30		Details		Shaoxing

October 27, 2011; 13:20
October 27, 2011; 13:20	Belgium	46–10	South Africa	Shaoxing
October 27, 2011; 13:20		Details		Shaoxing

October 28, 2011; 13:10
October 28, 2011; 13:10	South Africa	12–23	Hong Kong	Shaoxing
October 28, 2011; 13:10		Details		Shaoxing

October 28, 2011; 15:00
October 28, 2011; 15:00	Belgium	35–11	Russia	Shaoxing
October 28, 2011; 15:00		Details		Shaoxing

October 29, 2011; 13:10
October 29, 2011; 13:10	Belgium	56–6	Hong Kong	Shaoxing
October 29, 2011; 13:10		Details		Shaoxing

October 29, 2011; 18:40
October 29, 2011; 18:40	Russia	35–9	South Africa	Shaoxing
October 29, 2011; 18:40		Details		Shaoxing

POOL C	Pts	P	W	L	F	A	D
Chinese Taipei	9	3	3	0	93	54	+39
England	6	3	2	1	66	56	+10
Poland	3	3	1	2	51	80	−29
Australia	0	3	0	3	59	79	−20

October 27, 2011; 15:10
October 27, 2011; 15:10	England	23–14	Poland	Shaoxing
October 27, 2011; 15:10		Details		Shaoxing

October 27, 2011; 17:00
October 27, 2011; 17:00	Chinese Taipei	32–21	Australia	Shaoxing
October 27, 2011; 17:00		Details		Shaoxing

October 28, 2011; 16:50
October 28, 2011; 16:50	England	23–17	Australia	Shaoxing
October 28, 2011; 16:50		Details		Shaoxing

October 28, 2011; 18:40
October 28, 2011; 18:40	Chinese Taipei	36–13	Poland	Shaoxing
October 28, 2011; 18:40		Details		Shaoxing

October 29, 2011; 15:00
October 29, 2011; 15:00	Australia	21–24	Poland	Shaoxing
October 29, 2011; 15:00		Details		Shaoxing

October 29, 2011; 16:50
October 29, 2011; 16:50	Chinese Taipei	25–20	England	Shaoxing
October 29, 2011; 16:50		Details		Shaoxing

POOL D	Pts	P	W	L	F	A	D
Catalonia	9	3	3	0	76	39	+37
Czech Republic	6	3	2	1	70	41	+29
China	3	3	1	2	50	65	−15
Wales	0	3	0	3	23	74	−51

October 27, 2011; 16:40
October 27, 2011; 16:40	Czech Republic	16–21	Catalonia	Shaoxing
October 27, 2011; 16:40		Details		Shaoxing

October 27, 2011; 20:45
October 27, 2011; 20:45	China	17–13	Wales	Shaoxing
October 27, 2011; 20:45		Details		Shaoxing

October 28, 2011; 14:00
October 28, 2011; 14:00	Catalonia	28–6	Wales	Shaoxing
October 28, 2011; 14:00		Details		Shaoxing

October 28, 2011; 19:30
October 28, 2011; 19:30	China	16–25	Czech Republic	Shaoxing
October 28, 2011; 19:30		Details		Shaoxing

October 29, 2011; 15:50
October 29, 2011; 15:50	Czech Republic	29–4	Wales	Shaoxing
October 29, 2011; 15:50		Details		Shaoxing

October 29, 2011; 15:50
October 29, 2011; 15:50	China	17–27	Catalonia	Shaoxing
October 29, 2011; 15:50		Details		Shaoxing

== Second round ==
=== Title pools ===
Done with the two best teams in every pool of the first round, carrying forward their match result.

POOL E	Pts	P	W	w	l	L	F	A	D
Netherlands	9	3	3	0	0	0	104	42	+62
Catalonia	6	3	2	0	0	1	50	63	-13
Czech Republic	3	3	1	0	0	2	54	77	−23
Portugal	0	3	0	0	0	3	46	72	−26

October 31, 2011; 14:00
October 31, 2011; 14:00	Catalonia	18–15	Portugal	Shaoxing
October 31, 2011; 14:00		Details		Shaoxing

October 31, 2011; 19:30
October 31, 2011; 19:30	Czech Republic	18–38	Netherlands	Shaoxing
October 31, 2011; 19:30		Details		Shaoxing

November 1, 2011; 15:50
November 1, 2011; 15:50	Catalonia	11–32	Netherlands	Shaoxing
November 1, 2011; 15:50		Details		Shaoxing

November 1, 2011; 19:30
November 1, 2011; 19:30	Czech Republic	20–18	Portugal	Shaoxing
November 1, 2011; 19:30		Details		Shaoxing

POOL F	Pts	P	W	w	l	L	F	A	D
Belgium	9	3	3	0	0	0	87	44	+43
Chinese Taipei	6	3	2	0	0	1	67	53	+14
England	3	3	1	0	0	2	58	77	−19
Russia	0	3	0	0	0	3	44	82	-38

October 31, 2011; 15:50
October 31, 2011; 15:50	England	16–31	Belgium	Shaoxing
October 31, 2011; 15:50		Details		Shaoxing

October 31, 2011; 17:40
October 31, 2011; 17:40	Chinese Taipei	25–12	Russia	Shaoxing
October 31, 2011; 17:40		Details		Shaoxing

November 1, 2011; 14:00
November 1, 2011; 14:00	Chinese Taipei	17–21	Belgium	Shaoxing
November 1, 2011; 14:00		Details		Shaoxing

November 1, 2011; 17:40
November 1, 2011; 17:40	England	22–21	Russia	Shaoxing
November 1, 2011; 17:40		Details		Shaoxing

=== Pools for 9th–16th places ===
Done with the two last teams in every pool of the first round, carrying forward their match result.

POOL G	Pts	P	W	w	l	L	F	A	D
Germany	9	3	3	0	0	0	74	47	+27
China	6	3	2	0	0	1	70	64	+6
India	3	3	1	0	0	2	70	76	−6
Wales	0	3	0	0	0	3	39	66	−27

October 31, 2011; 15:00
October 31, 2011; 15:00	Wales	12–24	Germany	Shaoxing
October 31, 2011; 15:00		Details		Shaoxing

October 31, 2011; 18:40
October 31, 2011; 18:40	China	37–26	India	Shaoxing
October 31, 2011; 18:40		Details		Shaoxing

November 1, 2011; 13:10
November 1, 2011; 13:10	China	16–25	Germany	Shaoxing
November 1, 2011; 13:10		Details		Shaoxing

November 1, 2011; 15:00
November 1, 2011; 15:00	Wales	14–25	India	Shaoxing
November 1, 2011; 15:00		Details		Shaoxing

POOL H	Pts	P	W	w	l	L	F	A	D
Poland	9	3	3	0	0	0	76	55	+21
Australia	6	3	2	0	0	1	81	59	+22
Hong Kong	3	3	1	0	0	2	64	72	-8
South Africa	0	3	0	0	0	3	40	75	-35

October 31, 2011; 13:10
October 31, 2011; 13:10	Australia	29–21	Hong Kong	Shaoxing
October 31, 2011; 13:10		Details		Shaoxing

October 31, 2011; 16:50
October 31, 2011; 16:50	Poland	21–14	South Africa	Shaoxing
October 31, 2011; 16:50		Details		Shaoxing

November 1, 2011; 16:50
November 1, 2011; 16:50	Australia	31–14	South Africa	Shaoxing
November 1, 2011; 16:50		Details		Shaoxing

November 1, 2011; 18:40
November 1, 2011; 18:40	Poland	31–20	Hong Kong	Shaoxing
November 1, 2011; 18:40		Details		Shaoxing

== Semifinals ==
=== 13th–16th places ===
November 2, 2011; 14:00
November 2, 2011; 14:00	India	28–16	South Africa	Shaoxing
November 2, 2011; 14:00		Details		Shaoxing

November 2, 2011; 16:00
November 2, 2011; 16:00	Wales	15–19	Hong Kong	Shaoxing
November 2, 2011; 16:00		Details		Shaoxing

=== 9th–12th places ===
November 2, 2011; 18:00
November 2, 2011; 18:00	Germany	26–15	Australia	Shaoxing
November 2, 2011; 18:00		Details		Shaoxing

November 2, 2011; 20:00
November 2, 2011; 20:00	China	20–21	Poland	Shaoxing
November 2, 2011; 20:00		Details		Shaoxing

=== 5th–8th places ===
November 3, 2011; 14:00
November 3, 2011; 14:00	Czech Republic	21–23	Russia	Shaoxing
November 3, 2011; 14:00		Details		Shaoxing

November 3, 2011; 16:00
November 3, 2011; 16:00	Portugal	23–24 (gg)	England	Shaoxing
November 3, 2011; 16:00		Details		Shaoxing

=== Championship semifinals ===
November 3, 2011; 18:00
November 3, 2011; 18:00	Netherlands	27–17	Chinese Taipei	Shaoxing
November 3, 2011; 18:00		Details		Shaoxing

November 3, 2011; 20:00
November 3, 2011; 20:00	Catalonia	14–27	Belgium	Shaoxing
November 3, 2011; 20:00		Details		Shaoxing

== Finals ==
15th–16th places

November 4, 2011; 14:00
November 4, 2011; 14:00	South Africa	13–14	Wales	Shaoxing
November 4, 2011; 14:00		Details		Shaoxing

13th–14th places

November 4, 2011; 16:00
November 4, 2011; 16:00	India	20–14	Hong Kong	Shaoxing
November 4, 2011; 16:00		Details		Shaoxing

11th–12th places

November 4, 2011; 18:00
November 4, 2011; 18:00	China	23–20	Australia	Shaoxing
November 4, 2011; 18:00		Details		Shaoxing

9th–10th places

November 4, 2011; 20:00
November 4, 2011; 20:00	Poland	18–23	Germany	Shaoxing
November 4, 2011; 20:00		Details		Shaoxing

7th–8th places

November 5, 2011; 10:00
November 5, 2011; 10:00	Czech Republic	12-16	Portugal	Shaoxing
November 5, 2011; 10:00		Details		Shaoxing

5th–6th places

November 5, 2011; 12:00
November 5, 2011; 12:00	Russia	22-29	England	Shaoxing
November 5, 2011; 12:00		Details		Shaoxing

3rd–4th places

November 5, 2011; 14:00
November 5, 2011; 14:00	Chinese Taipei	33-16	Catalonia	Shaoxing
November 5, 2011; 14:00		Details		Shaoxing

FINAL

November 5, 2011; 16:00
November 5, 2011; 16:00	Netherlands	32-26	Belgium	Shaoxing
November 5, 2011; 16:00		Details		Shaoxing

Semi-finals
4 November – Shaoxing
Netherlands	27
Chinese Taipei	17
4 November – Shaoxing
Belgium	27
Catalonia	14

Final
5 November – Shaoxing
Netherlands	32
Belgium	26
Third place
5 November – Shaoxing
Chinese Taipei	33
Catalonia	16

== Final standings ==
Team
1 Netherlands
2 Belgium
3 Chinese Taipei
4 Catalonia
5 England
6 Russia
7 Portugal
8 Czech Republic
9 Germany
10 Poland
11 China
12 Australia
13 India
14 Hong Kong
15 Wales
16 South Africa

== See also ==
- Korfball World Championship
- International Korfball Federation
