= England national korfball team =

England
- Association: English Korfball Association
- IKF membership: 2007 (1946 as BKA)
- IKF code: ENG (England)
- IKF rank: 9 (Jan.2025)

World Championships
- Appearances: 5
- First appearance: 2007
- Best result: 4th, 2015

European Championships
- Appearances: 5
- First appearance: 2010
- Best result: 4th, 2014
- http://www.englandkorfball.co.uk/

The England national korfball team is managed by the English Korfball Association (EKA), representing England in korfball international competitions. In 2007 the Great Britain national korfball team was split into 3 national teams: England, Wales and Scotland, that compete in all international competitions except the World Games, where they compete as a unified Great Britain national korfball team.

== Tournament history ==
World Championships
Year	Championship	Host	Classification
2007	8th World Championship	Brno (Czech Republic)	7th place
2011	9th World Championship	Shaoxing (China)	5th place
2015	10th World Championship	Antwerp, Ghent & Tielen (Belgium)	4th place
2019	11th World Championship	Durban (South Africa)	9th place
2023	12th World Championship	Taipei (Taiwan)	8th place

- Before 2007 they played as Great Britain national korfball team.

World Games
Year	Championship	Host	Classification

- For World games see Great Britain national korfball team.

European Championships
Year	Championship	Host	Classification
2010	4th European Championship	(Netherlands)	6th place
2014	5th European Championship	Maia (Portugal)	4th Place
2016	6th European Championship	Dordrecht (Netherlands)	6th place
2018	7th European Championship	Friesland (Netherlands)	7th place
2021	8th European Championship	Antwerp (Belgium)	4th place
2024	8th European Championship	Calonge (Catalonia)	7th place

- Before 2007 they played as Great Britain national korfball team.

== Current squad ==
National team at the IKF World Korfball Championship 2023

- Hannah Bealey
- Ayishah Chaudry
- Lavinia-Marie Harlow
- Grace Hawthorne
- Emma Moss
- Rachel Turner
- Tiggy Warner
- Ellis Bassom
- Dominic Brooks
- Oliver Francis
- Andrew Hall
- Kieron Hicks
- Blake Palfreyman
- Marcus Tighe
- Coach: Rob Williams

== See also ==
- Great Britain national korfball team
