= Hungary national korfball team =

Hungary
- Association: Magyar Korfball Szövetség (MKS)
- IKF membership: 1991
- IKF code: HUN (Hungary)
- IKF rank: 13 (Jan.2025)

World Championships
- Appearances: 6
- First appearance: 2003
- Best result: 9th place, 2023

European Championships
- Appearances: 8
- First appearance: 2002
- Best result: 6th place, 2021
- http://www.korfball.hu

The Hungary national korfball team is managed by the Magyar Korfball Szövetség (MKS), representing Hungary in korfball international competitions.

== Tournament history ==
World Championships
Year	Championship	Host	Classification
2003	7th World Championship	Rotterdam (The Netherlands)	10th place
2007	8th World Championship	Brno (Czech Republic)	10th place
2011	9th World Championship	Shaoxing (China)	DNQ
2015	10th World Championship	Ghent, Tielen, Antwerp (Belgium)	13th place
2019	11th World Championship	Durban (South Africa)	12th place
2023	12th World Championship	Taipei (Taiwan)	9th place

European Championships
Year	Championship	Host	Classification
2002	2nd European Championship	Terrassa, Badalona, Sant Boi de Llobregat, Mataró (Catalonia)	8th place
2006	3rd European Championship	Budapest (Hungary)	8th place
2010	4th European Championship	Leeuwarden, Tilburg, Almelo, The Hague (The Netherlands)	10th place
2014	5th European Championship	Cidade da Maia (Portugal)	7th place
2016	6th European Championship	Dordrecht (The Netherlands)	DNQ
2018	7th European Championship	Drachten, Gorredijk, Heerenveen and Leeuwarden (The Netherlands)	8th place
2021	8th European Championship	Antwerp (Belgium)	6th place
2024	9th European Championship	Calonge (Catalonia)	8th place

== Current squad ==
National team in the 2010 European Championship

- Gabriella Deák
- Anna Dolles
- Katalin Esek
- Andrea Nagy
- Márta Szuromi
- Sára Tasnádi
- Judit Varga
- Judit Veres
- Gábor Balpataki
- Dávid Benkovics
- Almos Beothy
- Péter Borz
- Robert Essig-Kacso
- Kristof Horváth
- Viktor Horváth
- Bálint Turchányi

National team in the 2007 World Championship

- Zsófia Hargitay
- Rozália Horváth
- Nóra Molnár
- Andrea Nagy
- Viktória Szalai
- Márta Szuromi
- Judit Varga
- Judit Veres
- Viktor Horváth
- Attila Erdei
- Dávid Benkovics
- Csaba Montvai
- Ádám Balpataki
- Tamás Dzsida
- Bálint Turchányi
- Péter Borz
- Coach: Alex Elewaut
