= Serbia national korfball team =

National sports team

Serbia
- Association: Korfbol savez Srbije
- IKF membership: 2005
- IKF code: SER (Serbia)
- IKF rank: 22 (Nov 2012)

European Championships
- Appearances: 1
- First appearance: 2010
- Best result: 14th place, 2010

European Bowl
- Appearances: 3
- First appearance: 2007
- Best result: 2nd (east), 2009
- http://www.korfbol.rs/

The Serbia national korfball team is managed by the Korfbol savez Srbije, representing Serbia in korfball international competitions. It has been a member of IKF since 2005.

== Tournament history ==
European Championships
| Year | Championship | Host | Classification |
| 2010 | 4th European Championship | Netherlands | 14th place |
| 2014 | 5th European Championship | Portugal | 13th place |

European Bowl
| Year | Championship | Host | Classification |
| 2007 | 2nd European Bowl | Arandjelovac (Serbia) (East) | 3rd place (East) |
| 2009 | 3rd European Bowl | Prievidza (Slovakia) (East) | 2nd place (East) |
| 2013 | 4th European Bowl | Prievidza (Slovakia) (Centre) | 2nd place (Centre) |

Balcans Championship
| Year | Championship | Host | Classification |
| 2006 | 1st Balkan Korfball Championship | Neo Petritsi (Greece) | Champions |
| 2007 | 2nd Balkan Korfball Championship | Arandjelovac (Serbia) | Champions |
| 2008 | 3rd Balkan Korfball Championship | Blagoevgrad (Bulgaria) | Champions |

== Current squad ==
National team in the 2009 European Bowl

- Biljana Brekić
- Jelena Janković
- Kristina Savanović
- Sanja Todorovska
- Oliviera Jovanović
- Dina Stojanović
- Nadežda Petković
- Marijana Pavlović
- Filip Popović
- Radovan Bojanić
- Uros Corbić
- Vuk Hranisavljević
- Milos Nedeljković
- Ivan Vasilijević
- Velimir Cucaković
- Filip Garić
- Coach: Peter Van Vliet

National team in the 3rd Balkan Korfball Championship

- Biljana Brekić
- Kristina Savanović
- Dragana Crnomarković
- Maria Popović
- Jelena Janković
- Nadežda Petković
- Tijana Ilić
- Katarina Čolović
- Duško Planić
- Ivan Vasilijević
- Filip Popović
- Vuk Hranisavljević
- Pavle Eftimovski
- Milan Batas Bjelić
- Marko Beronja
- Miloš Nedeljković
- Coach: Branko Pejović
- Team manager: Radomir Krivokapić
