= Ireland national korfball team =

Ireland
- Association: Irish Korfball Association
- IKF membership: 2007
- IKF code: IRE
- IKF rank: 22 (Nov. 2025)

World Championships
- Appearances: 2
- First appearance: 2019
- Best result: 16th place, 2019

European Championships
- Appearances: 1
- First appearance: 2010
- Best result: 12th place, 2010

European Bowl
- Appearances: 4
- First appearance: 2007
- Best result: 3rd (west), 2007, 2009

The Ireland national korfball team is managed by the Ireland Korfball Association (IKA), representing Ireland in korfball international competitions.

The team is almost entirely made up from expatriates and those of Irish heritage, mostly from Great Britain and the Benelux, as there is no korfball set up within Ireland.

The squad is an all-Ireland team and uses Ireland's Call as a national anthem.

== Tournament history ==
World Championships
Year	Championship	Host	Classification
2019	11th World Championships	Durban, (South Africa)	16th place
2023	12th World Championships	Taipei (Taiwan)	17th place

European Championships
Year	Championship	Host	Classification
2010	4th European Championship	(Netherlands)	12th place
2014	5th European Championship	(Portugal)	12th place

European B-Championship
Year	Championship	Host	Classification
2018	1st European B-Championship	Drachten, Gorredijk, Heerenveen, Leeuwarden (Netherlands)	2nd place
2021	2nd European B-Championship	Wrocław (Poland)	5th place
2024	3rd European B-Championship	Kemer (Turkey)	7th place

European Bowl
Year	Championship	Host	Classification
2007	2nd European Bowl	Luxembourg	3rd place (West)
2009	3rd European Bowl	Luxembourg (West)	3rd place (West)
2013	4th European Bowl	Papendrecht (East)	5th place (East)
2016	5th European Bowl	France (West)	3rd place (West)
