= Turkey national korfball team =

National sports team

Turkey
- Association: Turkish Korfball Committee
- IKF membership: 1997
- IKF code: TUR (Turkey)
- IKF rank: 12 (Jan. 2025)

World Championships
- Appearances: 1
- First appearance: 2023
- Best result: 13th place, 2023

European Championships
- Appearances: 1
- First appearance: 2010
- Best result: 16th place, 2010

European B-Championship
- Appearances: 3
- First appearance: 2009
- Best result: 2nd, 2024
- http://www.korfbol.com

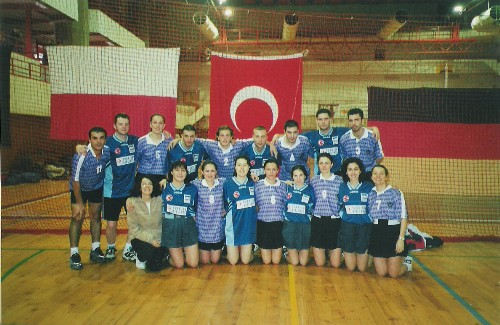
Picture of the team

The Turkey national korfball team represents Turkey in international korfball competitions. It is managed by the Turkish Korfball Committee (TKC), which operates under the Turkish Developing Sports Branches Federation (TDSBF), the umbrella body responsible for the development of several sports in the country.

== Tournament history ==
World Championships
Year	Championship	Host	Classification
2023	12th World Championship	Taipei (Taiwan)	13th place

European Championships
Year	Championship	Host	Classification
2010	4th European Championship	Netherlands	16th place

B-Championship
Year	Championship	Host	Classification
2009	3rd European Bowl	Slovakia (East division)	3rd place (East)
2021	2nd European B-Championship	Wrocław (Poland)	3rd place
2024	3rd European B-Championship	Kemer (Turkey)	2nd place

== Current squad ==
National team in the 2009 European Bowl

- Asina Durmus
- Cevriye Sel
- Didem Kahya
- Nalan Ayas
- Selin Tutar
- Bugce Nehir
- Nefize Sayildi
- Deniz Akta
- Emrah Aksumer
- Muhammed Eemin Can
- Vahit Berk Polat
- Eren Hashas
- Enis Bayrakter
- Oktay Goksel
- Coach: Daniel De Rudder
