= Wales national korfball team =

National sport team

Wales
- Association: Welsh Korfball Association/Cymdeithas Pêl-Côrff Cymru
- IKF membership: 2007; 19 years ago
- IKF code: WAL (Wales)
- IKF rank: 30 (Jan. 2023)

World Championships
- Appearances: 1
- First appearance: 2011
- Best result: 15th

European Championships
- Appearances: 4
- First appearance: 2010
- Best result: 11th place

Celtic Tri-Nations
- Appearances: 5
- First appearance: 2021
- Best result: 1st
- https://www.welshkorfball.org/

The Wales National Korfball Team often referred to as the Welsh Korfball Squad (WKS) is managed by the Welsh Korfball Association/Cymdeithas Pêl-Côrff Cymru, and represents Wales in international korfball competition. The Welsh Korfball Squad entered its first IKF ranking competition in 2007, after the Great Britain national korfball team was disbanded to produce three teams: England, Wales and Scotland. Wales is a fully recognised member of the International Korfball Federation and is currently ranked 18th in the world.

They played the World Championships for the first and only time in 2011, after the withdrawal of Hungary. In 2006 they reached the 3rd place in the Korfball Commonwealth Games.

== Tournament results ==
World Championships
Year	Championship	Host	Classification
2011	9th World Championship	Shaoxing, China	15th place

- See also Great Britain national korfball team.

World Games
Year	Championship	Host	Classification

- For World games see Great Britain national korfball team.

European Championships
Year	Championship	Host	Classification
2010	4th European Championships	Netherlands	11th place
2014	5th European Championships	Portugal	16th place
2018	7th European Championships	Netherlands	12th place
2021	8th European Championships (B-Division)	Poland	8th place

- See also Great Britain national korfball team.

Celtic Tri-Nations
Year	Championship	Host	Classification
2021	Celtic Tri-Nations	Gloucester, England	3rd place
2022	Celtic Tri-Nations	Edinburgh, Scotland	3rd place
2023	Celtic Tri-Nations	Cardiff, Wales	1st place
2024	Celtic Tri-Nations	UEA, England	1st place
2025	Celtic Tri-Nations	Edinburgh, Scotland	1st place

European Bowl
Year	Championship	Host	Classification
2007	2nd European Bowl	Luxembourg	Champions (West)
2009	3rd European Bowl	Luxembourg	Champions (West)
2013	4th European Bowl	Netherlands	2nd place (East)

Commonwealth Championship
Year	Championship	Host	Classification
2006	1st Korfball Commonwealth Championship	London, England	3rd place

== Squad ==
The Welsh Korfball Squad is selected by the coaching staff as appointed by the WKA.

=== Current squad ===
Wales International Squad

- Kiera Wilcox (Bristol Thunder (England) )
- Bethan Phillips (Birmingham City (England) )
- Niki Morgan (Birmingham City (England) )
- Jo Davies (Nottingham (England) )
- Laura Comerford (Bristol Thunder (England) )
- Helen Davies (Highbury (England) )
- Olivia Tyso (Cardiff Raptors (Wales) )
- Leo Comerford (Bristol Thunder (England) )
- Jordan Evans (Cardiff Raptors (Wales) )
- James Wilcox (Bristol Thunder (England) )
- Andrew May (Bristol Thunder (England) )
- Kris Banham (Cardiff Raptors (Wales) )
- Siôn Edwards (Reading Rooks (England) )
- Leo Michael (Manchester Warriors (England) )
- Cerys Morgan (Liver Birds (England) )
- Coach: Ross Carr-Taylor (England)
- Coach: Ruth Barbir (Wales)
- Team Manager: Mary Wilcox (Wales)

== Most capped players ==
Players with an equal number of caps are ranked in chronological order of reaching the milestone.

#	Name	Career	Caps	Goals	Position
1	Nick Wilkins	2005-2023	81	137	Steady
2	Ruth Barbir	2007-2022	61	81	Steady
3	John Williams	2006-2018	57	64	Steady
4	James Wilcox	2013-2023	56	127	Steady
5	Bethan Phillips	2013–2023	53	51	Steady
6	Ramzi Barbir	2005-2018	50	93	Steady
7	Zoe Rose	2006-2016	49	17	Steady
8	Carla Bennett	2010-2021	48	54	Steady
9	Kevin Jones	2005-2022	45	62	Steady
10	Leo Comerford	2015-2023	37	52	▲1
11	Dave Buckland	2005-2013	36	66	▼1
12	Susan Jones	2005-2010	29	13	Steady
13	Rick Scowcroft	2011-2017	26	14	Steady
14	Jo Knott	2011-2018	25	5	Steady
15	Hannah Ager	2008-2014	24	9	Steady

== Top goalscorers ==
Goalscorers with an equal number of goals are ranked with the highest to lowest goals per game ratio.

#	Name	Career	Goals	Caps	Position	Average
1	Nick Wilkins	2005-2023	137	81	Steady	1.69
2	James Wilcox	2013-2023	127	56	Steady	2.27
3	Ramzi Barbir	2005-2018	93	50	Steady	1.86
4	Ruth Barbir	2007-2022	81	61	Steady	1.33
5	Dave Buckland	2005-2013	66	36	Steady	1.83
6	John Williams	2006-2018	64	57	Steady	1.12
7	Kevin Jones	2005-2022	62	45	Steady	1.38
8	Carla Bennett	2010-2021	54	48	Steady	1.13
9	Leo Comerford	2015-2023	52	37	Steady	1.41
10	Bethan Phillips	2013-2023	51	53	Steady	0.96
11	Kiera Wilcox	2019-2023	34	20	▲1	1.70
12	Steve Jones	2005-2007	25	10	▼1	2.50
13	Helen Davies	2016-2022	21	20	Steady	1.05
14	Ceri Jones	2005-2010	19	20	Steady	0.95
15	Zoe Rose	2006-2016	17	49	Steady	0.35

== See also ==
- Korfball in Wales
- IKF World Korfball Ranking
