= Slovakia national korfball team =

National sports team

Slovakia
- Association: Slovak Korfball Association (SAK)
- IKF membership: 1994
- IKF code: SVK (Slovakia)
- IKF rank: 18 (Jan. 2017)

World Championships
- Appearances: 2
- First appearance: 1995
- Best result: 10th, 1995

European Championships
- Appearances: 3
- First appearance: 1998
- Best result: 8th, 1998

European Bowl
- Appearances: 2
- First appearance: 2007
- Best result: Champions, 2007
- http://www.korfbal.sk

The Slovakia national korfball team (Slovak: Slovenské národné korfbalové družstvo) is managed by the Slovak Korfball Association (SAK), representing Slovakia in korfball international competitions.

In 2007 Slovakia won the European Bowl and in 2009, the European Bowl (East).

== Tournament history ==
World Championships
| Year | Championship | Host | Classification |
| 1995 | 5th World Championship | New Delhi (India) | 10th place |
| 2003 | 7th World Championship | Rotterdam (The Netherlands) | 13th place |

European Championships
| Year | Championship | Host | Classification |
| 1998 | 1st European Championship | Estoril (Portugal) | 8th place |
| 2002 | 2nd European Championship | Catalonia | 9th place |
| 2010 | 4th European Championship | Netherlands | 13th place |

European Bowl
| Year | Championship | Host | Classification |
| 2007 | 2nd European Bowl | Serbia | Champions |
| 2009 | 3rd European Bowl | Prievidza (Slovakia) (East) | Champions (East) |

== Current squad ==
National team in the 2009 European Bowl

- Denisa Walova
- Katarina Pernisova
- Lucia Dekanova
- Monika Zanova
- Romana Lihotska
- Lujza Mojzisova
- Mariola Pavlakova
- Michaela Svitekova
- Maros Gajdosik
- Matej Mendel
- Peter Busik
- Peter Fabik
- Tomas Kocner
- Marek Marcan
- Martin Hlavac
- Róbert Mojzis
- Coach: Marcel Kavala

National team in the 2007 European Bowl Final

- Janetta Schniererova
- Katarina Pernisova
- Michaela Svitekova
- Monika Zanova
- Monika Pernisova
- Zuzana Jahnatkova
- Marek Sebo
- Maros Gajdosik
- Milan Polerecky
- Roland Kiss
- Peter Busik
- Marek Marcan
- Martin Zan
- Coach: Marcel Kavala
