= Scotland national korfball team =

Scotland
- Association: Scottish Korfball Association
- IKF membership: 2007 (1946 as BKA)
- IKF code: SCO (Scotland)
- IKF rank: 16 (Jan. 2017)

European Championships
- Appearances: 2
- First appearance: 2010
- Best result: 14th, 2018

European Bowl
- Appearances: 3
- First appearance: 2007
- Best result: 2nd (west), 2009
- http://www.scotlandkorfball.co.uk/

The Scotland National Korfball Team is managed by the Scottish Korfball Association (SKA), representing Scotland in korfball international competitions. It entered in competition in 2007, when the Great Britain National Korfball Team was split in 3 teams: England, Wales and Scotland.

== Tournament History ==
European Championships
Year	Championship	Host	Classification
2010	European Championship	Netherlands	15th
2018	European Championship	Netherlands	14th

- Before 2007 they played as Great Britain National Korfball Team.

European Bowl
Year	Championship	Host	Classification
2007	2nd European Bowl	Luxembourg	4th place (West)
2009	3rd European Bowl	Luxembourg (West)	2nd place (West)
2013	4th European Bowl	Slovakia (West)	3rd place (West)

== Current squad ==
- Heather MacKintosh (vc)
- Katrina Caldwell
- Katrina Murdoch
- Nadine Gallagher
- Tamzin Ellis
- Rebecca Fitch
- Ellise Anderson
- George Rourke (c)
- Michael Chadband
- Angus Davidson
- Ross Fraser
- David Wiseman
- Colin Williamson
- Owen Shea
- Coach: John Bagnall
- Assistant Coach: Pat Merton
- Team Manager: Sean Binnie

National Team in the 2013 European Bowl

- Eleanor Gaunt
- Sarah McKeand
- Andrea Kinver
- Natasha Lynch
- Rebecca Louise Pratt
- Emma Stanley
- Nicol Van Rijbroek
- Mike Brayne
- Kyle Crombie
- Angus Davidson
- Daniel Pratt
- Erik Rustenburg
- Elliot Samson
- John Wright
- Official Coach: Johan Oosterling
- Team Manager: Mary Cooper

== See also ==
- Great Britain National Korfball Team
