= 2018 Pan-American Korfball Championship =

2018 Pan- American Korfball Championship
Tournament details
- Host country: Colombia
- City: Cali
- Dates: 2 March 2018– 4 March 2018
- Teams: 6
- Venue(s): 1 (in 1 host city)

Final positions
- Champions: Suriname (1st title)
- Runners-up: Dominican Republic
- Third place: Brazil

Tournament statistics
- Matches played: 15
- Goals scored: 365 (24.33 per match)
- Top scorer(s): (Suriname) Ariën van den Berg (21 Goals)

The Second Pan-American Korfball Championship was held in Colombia from 2 March 2018 to 4 March 2018, with 6 national teams in competition. The korfball tournament also served as an American qualifier for the 2019 IKF World Korfball Championship, with the top two nations qualifying for the world championship.

Brazil was the defending champion but had to settle for third as Suriname and Dominican Republic took the top two spots and qualified for the 2019 IKF World Korfball Championship.

== Results ==
The six teams played a simple group stage tournament, with the top team crowned Pan-American champions. Suriname secured the title on 3 March with one match to play as they had a three point lead over Brazil and Dominican Republic, two teams which they had already beaten and which still had to play each other in the final match to determine second place.

Pos	Team	Pld	W	OTW	OTL	L	GF	GA	GD	Pts	Qualification
1	Suriname	5	5	0	0	0	104	35	+69	15	2019 IKF World Korfball Championship
2	Dominican Republic	5	4	0	0	1	82	49	+33	12	2019 IKF World Korfball Championship
3	Brazil	5	3	0	0	2	59	64	−5	9	
4	Colombia	5	2	0	0	3	48	61	−13	6	
5	Argentina	5	1	0	0	4	43	70	−27	3	
6	Costa Rica	5	0	0	0	5	29	86	−57	0	

Team 1	Score	Team 2
Brazil	15 − 13	Argentina
Colombia	5 − 21	Suriname
Dominican Republic	24 − 6	Costa Rica
Brazil	10 − 18	Suriname
Dominican Republic	13 − 5	Argentina
Colombia	12 − 3	Costa Rica
Argentina	8 − 22	Suriname
Colombia	12 − 19	Dominican Republic
Brazil	17 − 8	Costa Rica
Dominican Republic	9 − 20	Suriname
Argentina	10 − 9	Costa Rica
Colombia	8 − 11	Brazil
Suriname	23 − 3	Costa Rica
Colombia	11 − 7	Argentina
Dominican Republic	17 − 6	Brazil

Key: ^{G} denotes win by golden goal.

== Final standing ==
Rank	Team
1st place, gold medalist(s)	Suriname
2nd place, silver medalist(s)	Dominican Republic
3rd place, bronze medalist(s)	Brazil
4	Colombia
5	Argentina
6	Costa Rica
