= Suriname at the 2025 World Games =

- IOC code: SUR
- NOC: Suriname Olympic Committee

in Chengdu, China 7 August 2025 – 17 August 2025
- Competitors: 14 (7 men and 7 women) in 1 sport

World Games appearances
- 1981; 1985; 1989; 1993; 1997; 2001; 2005; 2009; 2013; 2017; 2022; 2025

Suriname will compete at the 2025 World Games held in Chengdu, China from 7 to 17 August 2025.

== Competitors ==
The following is the list of number of competitors in the Games.

Sport	Men	Women	Total
Korfball	7	7	14
Total	7	7	14

== Korfball ==
Suriname qualified in korfball at the 2023 IKF World Korfball Championship.

Indoor

Athlete	Event	Group stage				Semi-final	Final / BM	
Athlete	Event	Opposition Score	Opposition Score	Opposition Score	Rank	Opposition Score	Opposition Score	Rank
Team Suriname	Korfball	Germany; W 14-15	Czech Republic; L 19-16	Belgium; W 11-15	3	China; W 12-19	Germany; W 16-14	5
