= Suriname at the 2022 World Games =

- IOC code: SUR
- NOC: Suriname Olympic Committee

in Birmingham, Alabama, United States 7 July 2022 – 17 July 2022
- Competitors: 14 in 1 sport
- Medals: Gold 0 Silver 0 Bronze 0 Total 0

World Games appearances
- 1981; 1985; 1989; 1993; 1997; 2001; 2005; 2009; 2013; 2017; 2022; 2025

Suriname competed at the 2022 World Games held in Birmingham, United States from 7 to 17 July 2022.

== Competitors ==
Sports	Men	Women	Total
Korfball	7	7	14
Total	7	7	14

== Korfball ==
Suriname qualified for the Korfball competition by finishing sixth at the 2019 IKF World Korfball Championship.

Athlete	Event	Group Stage				Semifinal	Final	
Athlete	Event	Opposition Score	Opposition Score	Opposition Score	Rank	Opposition Score	Opposition Score	Rank
Team Suriname	Korfball	Germany (GER); L 22 - 24	China (CHN); W 25 - 19	Belgium (BEL); L 14 - 29	3rd	did not advance		
