= Colombia national korfball team =

Colombia
- Association: Federacion Korfball Colombia (FKC)
- IKF membership: 2015
- IKF code: COL (Colombia)
- IKF rank: 45 (Nov. 2025)

American Championship
- Appearances: 2
- First appearance: 2014
- Best result: 2014 (2nd Place)

The Colombia national korfball team represents Colombia in korfball international competitions.

== Tournament history ==
American Championship
Year	Championship	Host	Classification
2014	1st America Championship	Brazil	2nd place
2018	2nd America Championship	Colombia	4th place
