= Mexico national korfball team =

Mexico
- Association: N/A
- IKF membership: N/A
- IKF code: MEX (Mexico)
- IKF rank: 41 (Nov.2014)

American Championship
- Appearances: 1
- First appearance: 2014
- Best result: 2014 (3rd Place)

The Mexico national korfball team represents Mexico in korfball international competitions.

== Tournament history ==
American Championship
| Year | Championship | Host | Classification |
| 2014 | 1st America Championship | Brazil | 3rd place |
