= Korfball at the 2025 World Games =

- Venue: Longquan High School Gymnasium (indoor); Xinglong Lake Arena (beach)
- Dates: 7–17 August 2025
- No. of events: 2
- Competitors: 146 from 11 nations

The korfball competition at the 2025 World Games took place from 7–17 August 2025, in Chengdu in China. Beach korfball make its debut as official discipline in World Games sports program.

== Qualification ==
A total of 11 teams competed in the korfball and beach korfball events at the 2025 World Games.

The 2023 IKF World Korfball Championship (IKF WKC) acted as the qualification tournament for the indoor tournament. The seven best teams, and China as host qualified for the World Games.

The 2024 World Beach Korfball Championship acted as the qualification tournament for the beach tournament. The champions and runners-up qualified directly, while the other 6 teams qualified based on the world rankings.

=== Qualified teams ===
Indoor event

Team	Date of qualification	Method of qualification	Finals appearance	Previous appearance
China	29 October 2023	Host	2nd	2017
Netherlands	29 October 2023	Champions at the 2023 IKF WKC	11th	2022
Chinese Taipei	29 October 2023	Runners-up at the 2023 IKF WKC	10th	2022
Belgium	29 October 2023	3rd at the 2023 IKF WKC	11th	2022
Czech Republic	29 October 2023	4th at the 2023 IKF WKC	5th	2022
Suriname	29 October 2023	5th at the 2023 IKF WKC	2nd	2022
Germany	29 October 2023	6th at the 2023 IKF WKC	10th	2022
Portugal	29 October 2023	7th at the 2023 IKF WKC	6th	2022

Beach event

Team	Date of qualification	Method of qualification	Finals appearance
Netherlands	28 April 2024	Finished first at the 2024 WBKC	1st
China	28 April 2024	Finished second at the 2024 WBKC	1st
Poland	16 January 2025	Ranked 1st in IKF beach Korfball Rankings	1st
Chinese Taipei	16 January 2025	Ranked 2nd in IKF beach Korfball Rankings	1st
Hungary	16 January 2025	Ranked 4th in IKF beach Korfball Rankings	1st
Belgium	16 January 2025	Ranked 5th in IKF beach Korfball Rankings	1st
United States	16 January 2025	Ranked 6th in IKF beach Korfball Rankings	1st
Australia	16 January 2025	Ranked 10th in IKF beach Korfball Rankings	1st

== Medalists ==
Event	Gold	Silver	Bronze
Indoor	Netherlands; Jessica Lokhorst; Esther Cordus; Nikki Boerhout; Danielle Boadi; Fleur Hoek; Sabine Verhoef; Marije Visser; Olav van Wijngaarden; Ran Faber; Harjan Visscher; Carlo de Vries; Alwin Out; Julian Frieswijk; Bo Oppe	Belgium; Amber Engels; Lisa van Gorp; Lisa Pauwels; Lise van Maldeghem; Joke van Maldeghem; Britt Saey; Eline Denie; Nick Verwerft; Jordan de Vogelaere; Siebe de Ley; Jarre de Ley; Thomas Thijs; Joppe Bellemans; Kian Amorgaste	Chinese Taipei; Lin Ya-wen; Cho Ya-hui; Wu Pei-yun; Chen Cin; Chang Shu-chi; Lo Kai-yeh; Chan Ya-han; Chen Yuan-hao; Chang Chieh-sheng; Chiu Shao-en; Chen Chun-ta; Kao Chen-yu; Tsai Tsung-yu; Hsu Ching-chen
Beach	Chinese Taipei; Huang Ying-ting; Wu Jia-yi; Chu Shu-ping; Wang Yi-wen; Chang Chia-chuan; Wang Ming-kai	Netherlands; Mandy Koelman; Lynn Bijkerk; Jessie Heuveling; Jasper van der Eijk; Andre Zwart; Jesper Tolsma	Belgium; Elin Loos; Lauren Somers; Paulien Ryckx; Ruben Vergaert; Axel van Genechten; Cedric Schoumacker

== Indoor tournament ==
=== Group stage ===
==== Group A ====
Pos	Team	Pld	W	OTW	OTL	L	GF	GA	GD	Pts	Qualification
1	Netherlands	3	3	0	0	0	97	37	+60	9	Semifinals
2	Chinese Taipei	3	2	0	0	1	67	65	+2	6	Semifinals
3	Portugal	3	1	0	0	2	51	61	−10	3	5–8th place semifinals
4	China	3	0	0	0	3	32	84	−52	0	5–8th place semifinals

Source: 2025 World Games

8 August 2025	Netherlands	29–12	Portugal	Chengdu
15:45		Report		Stadium: Longquan High School Gymnasium

8 August 2025	China	14–28	Chinese Taipei	Chengdu
19:45		Report		Stadium: Longquan High School Gymnasium

9 August 2025	China	9–21	Portugal	Chengdu
15:45		Report		Stadium: Longquan High School Gymnasium

9 August 2025	Netherlands	33–18	Chinese Taipei	Chengdu
19:45		Report		Stadium: Longquan High School Gymnasium

10 August 2025	China	9–35	Netherlands	Chengdu
15:45				Stadium: Longquan High School Gymnasium

10 August 2025	Portugal	18–23	Chinese Taipei	Chengdu
19:45				Stadium: Longquan High School Gymnasium

==== Group B ====
Pos	Team	Pld	W	OTW	OTL	L	GF	GA	GD	Pts	Qualification
1	Belgium	3	3	0	0	0	68	35	+33	9	Semifinals
2	Czech Republic	3	1	1	0	1	49	61	−12	5	Semifinals
3	Suriname	3	1	0	0	2	42	48	−6	3	5–8th place semifinals
4	Germany	3	0	0	1	2	47	62	−15	1	5–8th place semifinals

Source: 2025 World Games

8 August 2025	Belgium	26–10	Czech Republic	Chengdu
14:00		Report		Stadium: Longquan High School Gymnasium

8 August 2025	Germany	14–15	Suriname	Chengdu
18:00		Report		Stadium: Longquan High School Gymnasium

9 August 2025	Czech Republic	19–16	Suriname	Chengdu
14:00				Stadium: Longquan High School Gymnasium

9 August 2025	Belgium	27–14	Germany	Chengdu
18:00		Report		Stadium: Longquan High School Gymnasium

10 August 2025	Suriname	11–15	Belgium	Chengdu
14:00				Stadium: Longquan High School Gymnasium

10 August 2025	Czech Republic	20–19	Germany	Chengdu
18:00				Stadium: Longquan High School Gymnasium

=== Knockout stage ===
==== 5–8th place semifinals ====
August 11, 2025	Portugal	20–23	Germany	Chengdu
14:00		Report		Stadium: Longquan High School Gymnasium

August 11, 2025	China	12–19	Suriname	Chengdu
15:45		Report		Stadium: Longquan High School Gymnasium

=== Semifinals ===
August 11, 2025	Netherlands	39–13	Czech Republic	Chengdu
18:00		Report		Stadium: Longquan High School Gymnasium

August 11, 2025	Belgium	19–13	Chinese Taipei	Chengdu
18:45		Report		Stadium: Longquan High School Gymnasium

=== Seventh place game ===
August 12, 2025	China	16–18	Portugal	Chengdu
14:00		Report		Stadium: Longquan High School Gymnasium

=== Fifth place game ===
August 12, 2025	Germany	14–16	Suriname	Chengdu
15:45		Report		Stadium: Longquan High School Gymnasium

=== Third place game ===
August 12, 2025	Czech Republic	15–19	Chinese Taipei	Chengdu
18:00		Report		Stadium: Longquan High School Gymnasium

=== Final ===
August 12, 2025	Netherlands	23–16	Belgium	Chengdu
19:45		Report		Stadium: Longquan High School Gymnasium
