= 2014 Pan-American Korfball Championship =

2014 Pan- American Korfball Championship
Tournament details
- Host country: Brazil
- City: Americana
- Dates: 31 January 2014– 2 February 2014
- Teams: 3
- Venue(s): 1 (in 1 host city)

Final positions
- Champions: Brazil (1st title)
- Runners-up: Colombia
- Third place: Mexico

Tournament statistics
- Matches played: 4
- Goals scored: 138 (34.5 per match)
- Top scorer(s): (Brazil) Daniel Ferreia (20 Goals)

The First Pan-American Korfball Championship was held in Brazil from January 31 to February 2, with 3 national teams in competition. Originally 4 national teams were to compete until the withdrawal of Argentina (for financial reasons), so spare match fixtures were played against a second Brazil team, who played their matches out of the competition.

The tournament also served as an American qualifier for the 2015 Korfball World Championship, with the top nation qualifying for the world championship.

== Group stage ==
The Group stage was held on January 31 and February 1.

Pos	Team	Pld	W	OTW	OTL	L	GF	GA	GD	Pts	Qualification
1	Brazil	2	1	1	0	0	54	20	+34	5	1st place Match
2	Colombia	2	1	0	1	0	38	21	+17	4	1st place Match
3	Mexico	2	0	0	0	2	16	65	−49	0	3rd place

Team 1	Score	Team 2
Brazil	40 − 7	Mexico
Colombia	13 − 14^{G}	Brazil
Mexico	9 − 25	Colombia

Key: ^{G} denotes win by golden goal.

== Final ==
The Final was played on 2 February.

1st place match Brazil 20 - 10 Colombia

== Final standing ==
Rank	Team
1st place, gold medalist(s)	Brazil
2nd place, silver medalist(s)	Colombia
3rd place, bronze medalist(s)	Mexico
