= Ringball =

Traditional sport

- Start of the 2016 South African National Tournament
- Highest governing body: International Ringball Federation (IRF)
- First played: 1907 in South Africa / 2010 International

Characteristics
- Contact: No
- Team members: 9 per side
- Mixed-sex: Yes, separate competitions
- Type: Team sport, ball sport
- Equipment: Ringball
- Venue: All weather, grass, or in-door

Presence
- Olympic: No

Ringball is a traditional South African sport that stems from basketball and has been played since 1907. The sport is now promoted in South Africa, Namibia, Botswana, Lesotho, India, and Mauritius to establish ringball as an international sport. The sport is played by both men and women teams.

== International Ringball Federation (IRF) ==
In 2007 (100th year of create of south african korfball) the name was changed to ringball and in 2010 the International Ringball Federation was formed.

== Gameplay ==
Ringball is a fair-contact sport played by both men and women teams in separate games. It is similar to the game of netball, korfball and can be played on an all-weather, grass, or in-door court. The court is divided into three sections. A team consists of three goal scorers, three centre players, and three defending players. The objective of the game is to throw the ball from one player to another and finally through the ring or hoop of the goalpost. A goalpost is placed at both ends of the court.

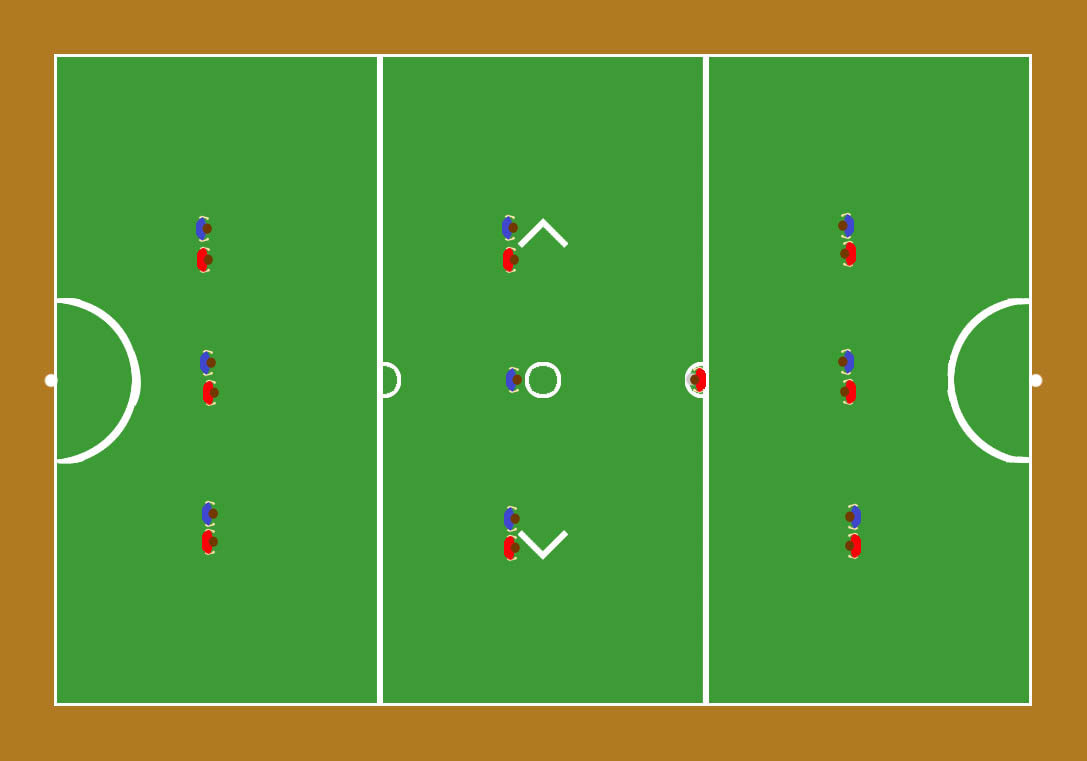
Starting positions of players on a Ringball court. The red player in the semicircle holds the ball.

The South African game of ringball is played by two opposing teams consisting of nine players on a side. Three players of each team play in each of the three sections of the court (three goal shooters, three centre players and three defenders). These players may at no time during play, touch ground in any adjacent section, step on or receive the ball over the lines separating the sections.

The ball is passed through the air from player to player and is caught with the hands, such that the ball does not touch any other part of the body. In passing the ball, a player may not move forward or backward, feint a pass, or be in possession of the ball for longer than two seconds during the attempt to pass the ball.

To score, the ball must fall through the ring from above. A goal shooter may attempt to score a goal from any position in the goal section and outside the semicircle. Both hands (from below upwards) must be used when shooting a goal and must be attempted within five seconds from the time the ball is received. When a penalty goal has been awarded, any of the three opposing goal shooters can attempt a goal from any position outside the goal circle. A penalty goal must be attempted within three seconds. A goal shooter can also attempt a penalty from behind the penalty line within three seconds.

Players may try to gain possession of the ball without hitting or snatching the ball from the opponent's hands. Players are not allowed to hold, push away or obstruct their opponents in any manner to prevent them from passing the ball. Two players of the same team may not touch or hold the ball simultaneously. It is an infringement if the ball crosses the section without being touched by a player in that section.

When players of both teams commit a transgression simultaneously, it is called a double fault. The referee then tosses the ball into the air between two opposing players where the transgressions occurred. The two opposing players then attempt to gain possession of the ball by hitting or catching the ball on the descend.

A match consists of two-halves of 25 minutes each with an interval of three minutes. After each successful goal, the players must take up position as shown on the image. The centre player stands in the half circle facing his own goalpost. At the blow of the whistle the ball must be passed to one of the wings within two seconds. It is an infringement when the ball is passed to another section without passing to a wing first.

When the ball goes out of play crossing the outside lines, an opposing player from that section puts the ball into play on the spot where it has left the court.

The team with the highest score at the end of the match is the winning team.

== Rules ==
=== The Court ===
1. The court is 27 m x 18 m in size and is divided into three equal sections (9 m x 18 m). The two goalposts are situated in the middle of each short side of the court against the outside line. Each goalpost has a steel ring of 450mm in diameter attached at the top, exactly 3 m from the ground. With the goalpost as pivot a half circle (the goal circle) with a radius of 4,5 m is drawn. The penalty line is short line in the goal section 1 m in length and 2 m from the middle inside line directly in line with the middle half circles. The two side sections are called the goal sections and the middle section is called the centre section. Exactly in the middle of the centre section, a circle of 1 m diameter and in the middle of the two inside lines, two half circles with a diameter of 1 m are drawn. On either side of the centre circle two "V”-lines with legs of 1 m long are drawn and this is referred to as the "V”. See the diagram below for the position of the goalposts.

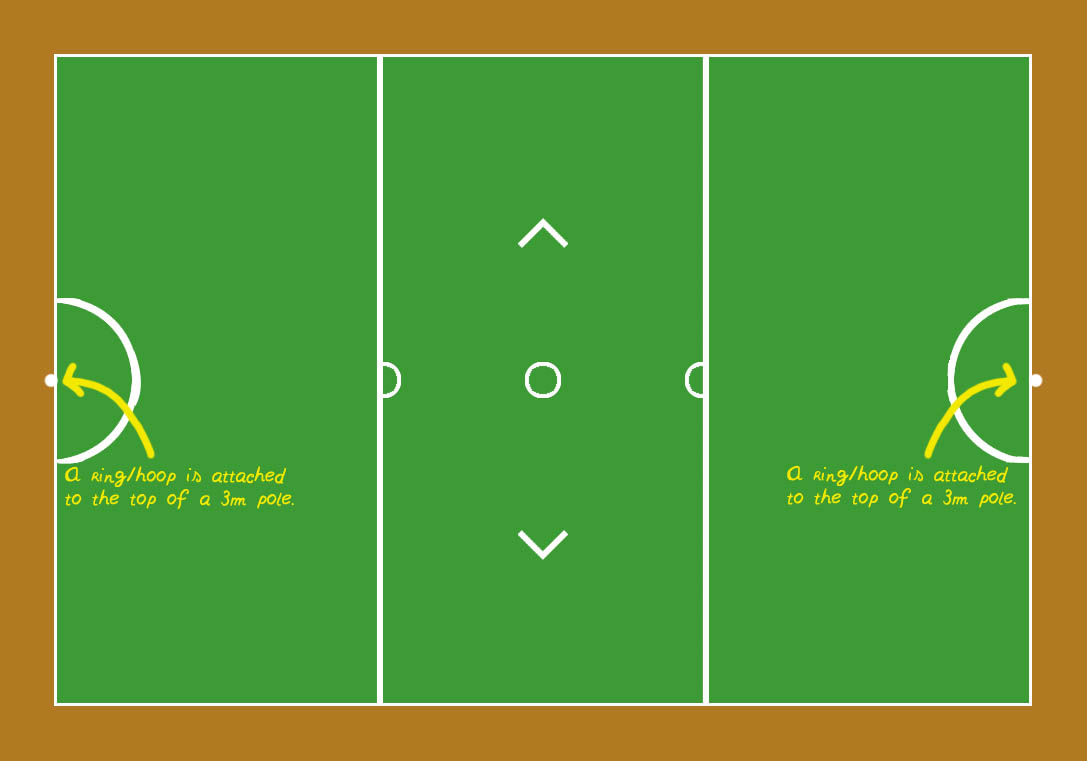
The image indicates the markings on a ringball court for the purpose of discussing the gameplay.

2. All-weather, gravel or grass courts, or adapted netball courts may be used. The surface of the court must be even. Gravel courts must be free of grass and must be well compacted. Slip-free all-weather courts are recommended. Netball courts can be used with minor adjustments.

3. Within a distance of 1,5 m around the court there should be no obstacles such as trees, light poles, walls, fences, wires or steps (also see the spectators section).

4. All lines must be clearly marked in white or yellow. The width of these lines should be between 25 mm and 50 mm.

5. The goalposts must be of 3 m circular steel pipes with a diameter of 75 – 90 mm. The goalposts must be placed in a vertical position in the centre of the 18 m outside line. The inside edge of the goal post must form a tangent with the inside edge of the line.

6. The ring on the goalpost must be of a sturdy round metal bar with a maximum of 18 mm thickness and an inside diameter of 350 mm. Flat steel rings are not allowed. The ring must be horizontally fixed (level) to the top of the post and should not hop up when the ball bounces on the ring. The rings should be painted white or silver.

7. The nets must be large enough to allow a number 5 ball to pass through and must be correctly fixed to the goal ring. White or yellow nylon nets are recommended. Balls could be shot out when the nets are affixed too tightly.

=== The Ball ===
1. A ball made of leather or synthetic material should be used. Rubber balls are not permitted (Wet leather balls and balls inflated too hard stretch while underinflated leather balls stretch at the seams).

2. All teams play with a number 5 ball, with a circumference of between 69 and 71 cm and a mass of approximately 450 grams (Balls with loose laces or uneven surfaces are not allowed).

3. The u/9, u/11 and u/13 teams play with a number 4 ball, with a circumference of 64 cm.

=== The Players ===
1. A ringball team consists of nine players, viz., three goal shooters, three centre players and three defenders. Only three players of a team are allowed in each section.

2. At least eight players of a team must be present at the start of a game. A player who arrives late, is allowed to join the game only when the ball is out of play and with the permission of the referee. No team is allowed to play with seven or less players after the game has started with eight or nine players; e.g. in the event of two players of the same team being disqualified during the match. The team with the disqualified players forfeits the league points and the opposing team wins the match.

3. No player is allowed to leave the court without the permission of the referee.

4. A maximum of three players of a team may be substituted at any time during the match. The substitution player may only join the team when the ball is out of play and with the permission of the referee.

5. In the event of a sick or injured player who is unable to continue play, a substitute may immediately take up his place. A disqualified player may not be substituted.

6. If the injured player only receives treatment and wants to return to continue play, no substitution player may take his position. Play continues with his team consisting of eight players until he is ready to return to his position to continue play.

7. In the event of all three substitutes already participating any of the original players may return to the game. An injured player, if sufficiently recovered, may return at own risk. No new substitutes may be used.

8. Injury time of two minutes is allowed on court. In the event of a serious injury, time must be granted for the player to receive medical treatment on court or to be removed. Injury time shall be added to the half in question.

9. A player experiencing any type of a bleeding must leave the court immediately and can be substituted. As soon as the bleeding has stopped, the player may rejoin the game with the permission of the referee. In the event of the player not returning within five minutes, the substitute will then complete the game.

=== The Referee ===
1. A qualified neutral person should officiate at matches as referee.

2. The referee shall enforce the rules and his decision is final. The referee's responsibility comprises, inter alia: a) enforcing the rules and regulate the game uniformly. b) ensuring that the match progresses orderly and obviating irregularities. c) promoting the fluency of the match. d) ensuring that the court and the ball are suitable for play.

3. The referee blows the whistle only: a) to start or end the match. b) after a goal was scored. c) when any infringement of a rule occurs. d) when the ball goes out of play.

4. The referee is ultimately responsible for the time and the score and, after consultation with the scorekeepers concerning the time and score, his decision is final.

5. The referee must verify the time with the linesman during the match.

6. The referee must verify the score during the interval. In the event where all three (referee and two scorekeepers) differ, the referee’s score shall be accepted. When the scores of the two scorekeepers are the same, their score shall be accepted after consultation.

7. An appeal against a referee can only be lodged on the grounds of incompetence and/or for any prejudice against and/or favouritism towards a particular team. Any appeal or objection must be lodged in accordance with the controlling body’s constitution as well as the prescribed instructions.

=== The Time ===
1. All matches consist of two periods of 25 minutes each with a half-time interval of three minutes. The teams change ends at half-time.

2. Should there be a tie during semi-final and final games, play will continue – 10 minutes on a side without half-time. Should it happen that it is still a tie after this additional time, the ball will be thrown up by the referee at the centre circle and the team that then scores the first goal, is the winner.

3. Injury time should be added to the specific period of play. (In competitions where a siren is used to control the time for the matches, the competition rules should include rules concerning injury time.)

4. Any intentional time wasting is penalised with a penalty. The following is considered as time wasting: a) Taking time to get ready for the restart of the game b) Changing of players in the event of injury or voluntary substitution c) Putting in of the ball at the outside lines d) For the changing of shoes, clothes, etc. e) Tossing the ball away

5. When time of play has run out, the game can only be ended as soon as the ball goes out of play or when a goal was scored.

=== The Score ===
1. A successful goal counts two points.

2. A successful penalty goal counts two points. A goal shooter may attempt a penalty goal from any position outside the goal circle when it is awarded at the first deliberate offence.

3. At the second occurrence of inadmissible play, another penalty is awarded and the offending player is yellow carded.

4. When the same player continuous with inadmissible play, another penalty is awarded. The offending player is red carded and disqualified for five minutes.

5. If the goal shooter attempts the penalty from behind the penalty line and is successful, three points are awarded. It is the goal shooter’s own choice to attempt the penalty from behind the penalty line.

6. A warning, yellow or red card can be awarded by the referee even after a goal has been scored.

=== Officials at a Match ===
1. The referee

2. Two responsible scorekeepers – one from each team who must present themselves to the referee just before the start of play. Team scorecards are not exchanged and the scorekeepers keep score independently.

3. A linesman. The referee shall be assisted by a linesman with a flag. He assists the referee on the opposite side of the court by indicating when the ball is out of play. He shall thus indicate where and which team has to put the ball into play.

4. The linesman must also assist the referee with time keeping.

=== Spectators ===
1. Spectators must remain one metre from the outside lines of the court.

2. Team managers must take up position on the opposite side from where the referee moves and one metre from the outside lines of the court.

3. Spectators are not allowed to interfere or hinder a goal shooter in his attempt to score a goal.

4. The referee is entitled to request any member of the controlling body to remove from the court any spectator or official who misbehaves during the match. The referee can stop the game until such time that the person in question has been removed.
