= Pan-American Korfball Championship =

Regional tournament

Pan-American Korfball Championship is the korfball competition played by Pan-American national teams.

== History ==
	Year	Host	Date	Champion	Second place	Third place	Number of Teams
I Details	2014	Americana, Brazil	31 Jan – 2 Feb	Brazil	Colombia	Mexico	3
II Details	2018	Cali, Colombia	2 Mar – 4 Mar	Suriname	Dominican Republic	Brazil	6
III Details	2022	Buenos Aires, Argentina	17 Dec – 19 Dec	Suriname	Brazil	Argentina	3
IV Details	2026	Paramaribo, Suriname	8 Oct – 10 Oct	Suriname	Brazil	—N/a	2
