= Fátima Ocampos =

Paraguayan handball player (born 2003)

Personal information
- Full name: Fátima Verónica Ocampos
- Nationality: Paraguayan
- Born: 3 January 2003 (age 23)
- Height: 1.80 m (5 ft 11 in)

Sport
- Sport: Handball
- Position: Goalkeeper
- Current club: Ariosto 2023

Senior clubs
- Years: Team
- –: Balonmano Base Oviedo
- –: Ariosto 2023
National team
Years	Team	Apps	(Gls)
–	Paraguay	52	(12)
Medal record
Pan American Games
Bronze medal – third place	2023 Santiago	Team
Junior Pan American Games
Silver medal – second place	2021 Cali	Team
- Updated on 27 November 2025

Fátima Verónica Ocampos (born 3 January 2003) is a Paraguayan handball player for Ariosto 2023 and the Paraguay national team.

She was selected to represent Paraguay at the 2021 World Women's Handball Championship.
