= HKC ALO =

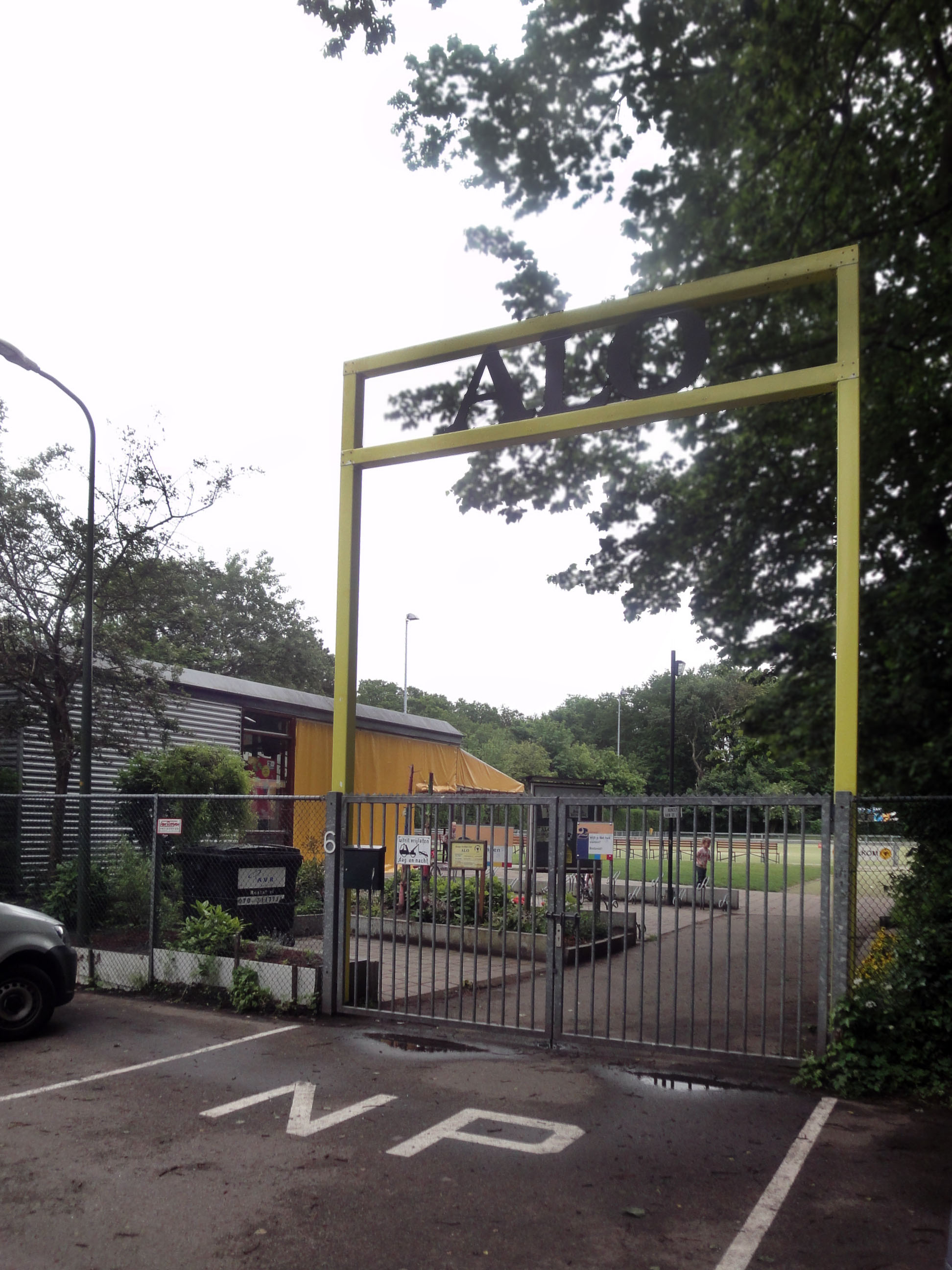
terrain of KSC ALO in The Hague

HKC ALO is a Dutch korfball team based in The Hague. Founded on February 1, 1906, ALO spent a number of years in the top divisions of the Dutch Korfball league.

ALO is the world's oldest non-merged Korfball team, with the other teams that were founded prior to February 1906 all having to merge over the years.

The ALO team today plays in the Dutch Korfball association's (KNKV) 1st class.
