= British Student Korfball Nationals =

BUCS, or British inter-university, Korfball competition take place every year, it is a chance for the student Korfball community to show off their skills in a competitive environment.

== Tournament Structure ==
The current structure is of preliminary, regional and then national tournaments, with seeding and progression to subsequent rounds determined at each. There are three tiers of final-stage national tournaments that University sides can progress to and earn BUCS points for their institution. These tournaments are (in ascending order): National Plate, National Trophy and National Championships. The winner of the BUCS National Championships receive the accolade of being crowned top university korfball club in Britain. The event is organised by the British Student Korfball Association and features two full days of korfball.

== BUSA/BUCS National Championships History ==
Year	1st place	2nd place	3rd place
2026	University of Manchester	Loughborough University	Leeds Beckett University
2025	University of Nottingham	Leeds Beckett University	University of Manchester
2024	Loughborough University	University of Nottingham	University of East Anglia
2023	University of Exeter	University of East Anglia	University of Manchester
2022	University of East Anglia	University of Kent	University of Exeter
2019	University of Sheffield	University of East Anglia	University of Nottingham
2018	University of East Anglia	Southampton University	University of Bristol
2017	University of East Anglia	Southampton University	University of Birmingham
2016	Southampton University	University of Nottingham	University of East Anglia
2015	Southampton University	University of East Anglia	Cardiff University
2014	University of Birmingham	University of East Anglia	Southampton University
2013	University of East Anglia	University of Nottingham	University of Birmingham
2012	University of Nottingham	University of St Andrews	University of Birmingham
2011	University of Nottingham	University of Sheffield	University of Birmingham
2010	University of Sheffield	Sheffield Hallam University	University of St Andrews
2009	University of Birmingham	University of Nottingham	Sheffield Hallam University
2008	Sheffield Hallam University	University of Oxford	University of London
2007	University of East Anglia	Sheffield Hallam University	University of Nottingham
2006	University of East Anglia	University of Edinburgh	University of Sheffield
2005	University of East Anglia	University of Cambridge	University of Edinburgh
2004	Sheffield Hallam University	University of East Anglia	
2003	University of Sheffield	University of East Anglia	
2002	University of Edinburgh	University of Nottingham	
2001	Cardiff University	University of Sheffield	
2000	University of Nottingham	University of Bristol	
1999	University of London	University of Sheffield	
1998	University of Nottingham	University of Sheffield	
1997	University of Cambridge	University of Sheffield	Cardiff University
1996	University of Cambridge	University of Oxford	
1995	University of Oxford	University of Cambridge	
1994	University of Edinburgh	University of Oxford	
1993	University of Sheffield	University of Oxford	
1992	University of Sheffield	University of Oxford	
1991	University of Sheffield	University of Nottingham	

In recent years at each round of competition, male and female top-scorers and male and female MVP (voted for by referees in each match officiated) are recognised.

BUCS National Championships Top Scorers and MVPs

Year	Male Top Scorer	Female Top Scorer	Male MVP	Female MVP
2026	Teodor Wator (University of Cambridge)	Chloé Blanks (University of Birmingham)	Oliver Francis (University of Nottingham)	Chloé Blanks (University of Birmingham)
2025	Teodor Wator (University of Cambridge)	Rebecca Hanks (University of Nottingham)		
2024	Jonny Potter (University of Bristol)	Joint: Hannah Bealey (University of East Anglia) & Rebecca Hanks (University of Nottingham)	Matthew Wilcox (University of Sheffield)	Lizzie Tighe (University of Bristol)
2023	Jonny Potter (University of Bristol)	Lizzie Tighe (University of Bristol)	Joshua Wilkinson (University of Manchester)	Lizzie Tighe (University of Bristol)
2022	Laurie Fabian (Cardiff University)	Flora Timney (University of Oxford)	Jack Birch (University of Cambridge)	Georgia Howitt-Sutton (University of Nottingham)
2021	Competition not held due to COVID-19 Pandemic			
2020	Competition not held due to COVID-19 Pandemic			
2019			Marcus Tighe (University of Nottingham)	Lizzie Tighe (University of Bristol)
2018	Hajime Shinohara (University of Cambridge)	Weis van Beek (University of East Anglia)	Robert Wright (Leeds Beckett University)	Lizzie Tighe (University of Bristol)
2017	Blake Palfreyman (University of Brighton)	Joint: Marleen Schutter (Lancaster University) & Robyn Seabright (University of Edinburgh)	Blake Palfreyman (University of Brighton)	Abi Smith (University of East Anglia)
2016				
2015	Toby Clarke (University of Brighton)	Lizzie McCloud (University of Nottingham)	Toby Clarke (University of Brighton)	Rebecca Fitch (University of Cardiff)
2014				

== See also ==
- Korfball
