= Iván Vassilev Todorov Arena =

Sports venue in Cali, Valle del Cauca, Colombia

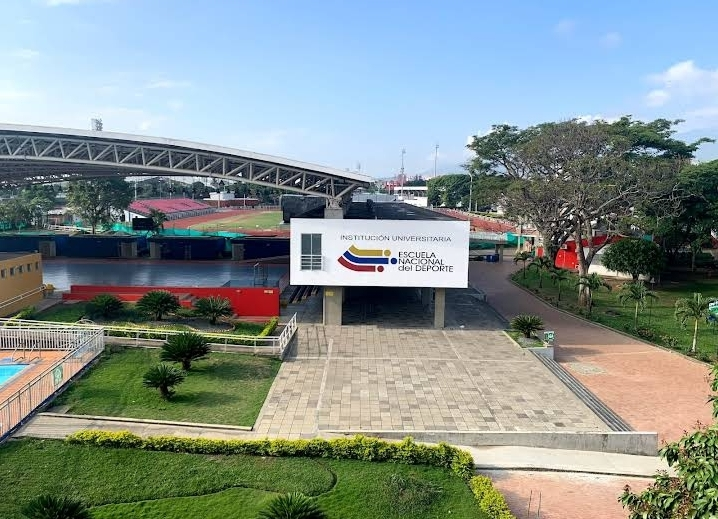
- Interactive map of Iván Vassilev Todorov Arena
- Address: Cl. 9b #32a-21
- Location: Cali, Valle del Cauca, Colombia
- Coordinates: 3.4258°N 76.5358°W
- Owner: National Sports School
- Capacity: 1,600
- Type: indoor arena

Construction
- Opened: 26 June 2013

The Iván Vassilev Todorov Arena (Spanish: Coliseo Mundialista Iván Vassilev Todorov) is a multi-purpose indoor arena located in Cali, Valle del Cauca, Colombia.

The arena is part of the National Sports School campus. Construction began on 9 February 2013 and ended on 26 June. The arena was inaugurated ahead of the 2013 World Games, at which it hosted the korfball competition. At the 2021 Junior Pan American Games, the Iván Vassilev Todorov Arena was the site of the handball competition. It has also been used for basketball, volleyball and futsal matches.

The Iván Vassilev Todorov Arena has a capacity of 1,600. It is named in honour of Bulgarian coach Iván Vassilev Todorov (d. 2019), grand master of the National Sports School and a key figure in the development of basketball in Colombia.
