= Brazil national korfball team =

Brazil
- Association: Federaçao Corfebol Estado Rio de Janeiro (FCERJ)
- IKF membership: 2003
- IKF code: BRA (Brazil)
- IKF rank: 23 (Nov. 2025)

World Championships
- Appearances: 2
- First appearance: 2015
- Best result: 2015 (16th place)

Pan-American Korfball Championship
- Appearances: 3
- First appearance: 2014
- Best result: Champions 2014
- http://www.fcerj.com.br

The Brazil national korfball team is managed by the Federaçao Corfebol Estado Rio de Janeiro (FCERJ), representing Brazil in korfball international competitions.

== Tournament history ==
World Championships
| Year | Championship | Host | Classification |
| 2015 | 10th World Championship | Antwerp, Ghent & Tielen (Belgium) | 16th place |
| 2023 | 12th World Championship | Taipei (Taiwan) | 22nd place |

Pan-American Korfball Championship
| Year | Championship | Host | Classification |
| 2014 | 1st Pan-America Championship | Americana (Brazil) | 1st place |
| 2018 | 2rd Pan-America Championship | Cali (Colombia) | 3nd place |
| 2022 | 3rd Pan-America Championship | Buenos Aires (Argentina) | 2nd place |
| 2026 | 4rd Pan-America Championship | Paramaribo (Suriname) | 2nd place |
