= Korfball at the 2005 World Games =

The korfball event at the 2005 World Games in Duisburg, Germany took place between the 14 to 24 July 2005. A total of 96 athletes from 6 national teams entered the competition. The competition took place at Sportpark Duisburg.

== Teams ==
- Germany (Host Country)
- Netherlands (Defending Champion)
- Chinese Taipei
- Czech Republic
- Belgium
- Great Britain

== Results ==
Date	Land	Score	Land
20 July	Netherlands	23 – 7	Czech Republic
20 July	Great Britain	12 – 14	Belgium
20 July	Germany	18 – 17	Chinese Taipei
21 July	Chinese Taipei	14 – 15	Belgium
21 July	Germany	14 – 22	Czech Republic
21 July	Netherlands	21 – 5	Great Britain
22 July	Czech Republic	15 – 9	Great Britain
22 July	Netherlands	18 – 12	Chinese Taipei
22 July	Belgium	22 – 8	Germany
23 July	Netherlands	20 – 6	Germany
23 July	Chinese Taipei	11 – 5	Great Britain
23 July	Belgium	12 – 11	Czech Republic
24 July	Great Britain	13 – 14	Germany
24 July	Czech Republic	10 – 11	Chinese Taipei
24 July	Netherlands	18 – 6	Belgium

== Final standings ==
Place on ranking	Team
Gold	Netherlands
Silver	Belgium
Bronze	Chinese Taipei
4	Czech Republic
5	Germany
6	Great Britain

Winner of the World Games in korfball 2005.

Netherlands
