= Korfball at the 2017 World Games =

- Venue: WKK Sport Center
- Location: Wrocław
- Dates: 21–25 July 2017
- Teams: 8

Medalists
gold medal	Netherlands
silver medal	Chinese Taipei
bronze medal	Belgium

The korfball event at the World Games 2017 took place in Wrocław, Poland.

== Qualification ==
A total of 8 teams competed in the korfball event at the World Games 2017.

The 2015 IKF World Korfball Championship (IKF WKC) acted as the qualification tournament. Seven teams qualified for the World Games, including all non-European teams finishing in the top 11. The remaining slots were filled by the top European teams in the competition, except for Poland which is the host country of the World Games 2017.

=== Qualified teams ===
Team	Date of qualification	Method of qualification	Finals appearance	Previous appearance
Poland	–	Host country	1st	–
Belgium	3 November 2015	Finished second at the 2015 IKF WKC.	9th	2013
Great Britain	3 November 2015	Finished fourth at the 2015 IKF WKC.	8th	2013
Netherlands	3 November 2015	Finished first at the 2015 IKF WKC.	9th	2013
Germany	6 November 2015	Finished sixth at the 2015 IKF WKC.	8th	2013
Chinese Taipei	31 October 2015	Finished 3rd at the 2015 IKF WKC as a non-European team.	8th	2013
China	31 October 2015	Finished 7th at the 2015 IKF WKC as a non-European team.	1st	–
Australia	7 November 2015	Finished 11th at the 2015 IKF WKC, qualifying as a non-European team.	4th	2009

1. Great Britain is awarded a spot at the tournament due to the qualification of England.
2. Germany still needed to play Catalonia to determine 5th and 6th place, however as the World Games are contested by countries instead of regions, Catalonia were ineligible for qualification. Therefore, Germany was sure of the remaining ticket.

== Preliminary round ==
=== Group A ===
Pos	Team	Pld	W	OTW	OTL	L	GF	GA	GD	Pts	Qualification
1	Netherlands	3	3	0	0	0	87	36	+51	9	Semifinals
2	Belgium	3	2	0	0	1	78	45	+33	6	Semifinals
3	Australia	3	1	0	0	2	43	79	−36	3	5–8th place semifinals
4	China	3	0	0	0	3	46	94	−48	0	5–8th place semifinals

Source: 2017 World Games

July 21, 2017	Netherlands	33–10	China	Wrocław
15:15		Report		Stadium: WKK Sport Center

July 21, 2017	Belgium	26–8	Australia	Wrocław
20:45		Report		Stadium: WKK Sport Center

July 22, 2017	China	23–25	Australia	Wrocław
13:30		Report		Stadium: WKK Sport Center

July 22, 2017	Netherlands	24–16	Belgium	Wrocław
19:00		Report		Stadium: WKK Sport Center

July 23, 2017	Australia	10–30	Netherlands	Wrocław
13:30		Report		Stadium: WKK Sport Center

July 23, 2017	Belgium	36–13	China	Wrocław
15:15		Report		Stadium: WKK Sport Center

=== Group B ===
Pos	Team	Pld	W	OTW	OTL	L	GF	GA	GD	Pts	Qualification
1	Chinese Taipei	3	3	0	0	0	74	46	+28	9	Semifinals
2	Germany	3	2	0	0	1	52	49	+3	6	Semifinals
3	Great Britain	3	1	0	0	2	51	47	+4	3	5–8th place semifinals
4	Poland (H)	3	0	0	0	3	42	77	−35	0	5–8th place semifinals

Source: 2017 World Games
(H) Host

July 21, 2017	Chinese Taipei	22–14	Germany	Wrocław
13:30		Report		Stadium: WKK Sport Center

July 21, 2017	Poland	11–23	Great Britain	Wrocław
19:00		Report		Stadium: WKK Sport Center

July 22, 2017	Chinese Taipei	23–16	Great Britain	Wrocław
15:15		Report		Stadium: WKK Sport Center

July 22, 2017	Poland	15–25	Germany	Wrocław
20:45		Report		Stadium: WKK Sport Center

July 23, 2017	Great Britain	12–13	Germany	Wrocław
19:00		Report		Stadium: WKK Sport Center

July 23, 2017	Poland	16–29	Chinese Taipei	Wrocław
20:45		Report		Stadium: WKK Sport Center

== Knockout stage ==
=== 5–8th place semifinals ===
July 24, 2017	China	27–24	Great Britain	Wrocław
13:30		Report		Stadium: WKK Sport Center

July 24, 2017	Poland	18–20	Australia	Wrocław
15:15		Report		Stadium: WKK Sport Center

=== Semifinals ===
July 24, 2017	Belgium	18–22	Chinese Taipei	Wrocław
19:00		Report		Stadium: WKK Sport Center

July 24, 2017	Germany	13–25	Netherlands	Wrocław
20:45		Report		Stadium: WKK Sport Center

=== Seventh place game ===
July 25, 2017	Great Britain	25–18	Poland	Wrocław
11:00		Report		Stadium: WKK Sport Center

=== Fifth place game ===
July 25, 2017	China	19–17	Australia	Wrocław
13:00		Report		Stadium: WKK Sport Center

=== Third place game ===
July 25, 2017	Belgium	24–9	Germany	Wrocław
17:00		Report		Stadium: WKK Sport Center

=== Final ===
July 25, 2017	Netherlands	26–14	Chinese Taipei	Wrocław
19:00		Report		Stadium: WKK Sport Center

== Final ranking ==
Rank	Team
Gold medal	Netherlands
Silver medal	Chinese Taipei
Bronze medal	Belgium
4	Germany
5	China
6	Australia
7	Great Britain
8	Poland
