= Nico Broekhuysen =

Dutch teacher (1876–1958)

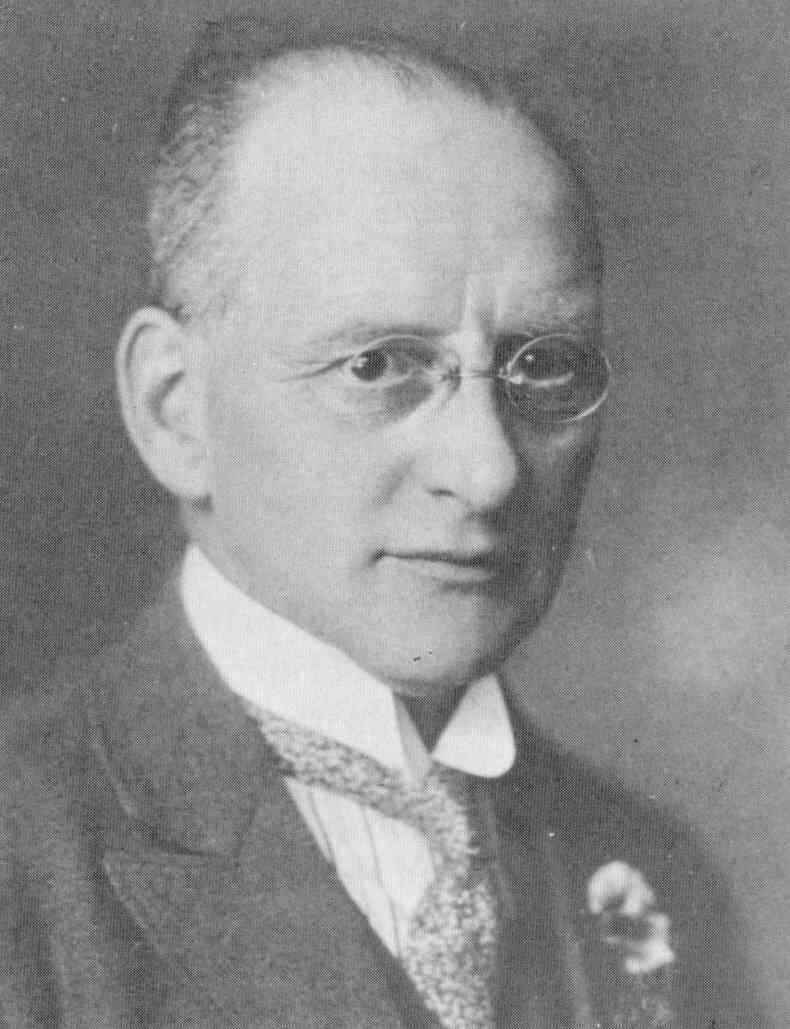
- Born: Nicolaas Broekhuijsen; 30 December 1876; Dordrecht, Netherlands
- Died: 13 May 1958; Hilversum, Netherlands
- Known for: Inventing korfball

Nicolaas Broekhuijsen (Dutch: [ˈnikoːlaːz brukˈɦœyzə(n)]; 30 December 1876 – 13 May 1958), better known as Nico Broekhuysen, was a Dutch teacher, who is known as the inventor of korfball.

He was a teacher at Oisterwijk and later Nijmegen and then Amsterdam where he taught at the new school association. In 1902, he went to the Swedish village near Nääs Castle for a course. There he saw the game ring boll played. This game was played with mixed gender teams. The ball had to be thrown through a ring on a three-meter high pole. The field was divided into three sections, where players were allowed to come out.

At home in Amsterdam, Broekhuysen showed his students a similar game. The rules have been simplified and the ring was replaced by a basket. The first game was played on a vacant lot at the Jan Luykenstraat. When the Amsterdam Association for Physical Education were looking for a game in which both boys and girls could join, he brought his version forward.

On June 2, 1903, the Dutch Korfball Association was founded, of which Broekhuysen became president. Korfball immediately became a popular sport, but also because of the mixed play that was considered immoral, controversial. A newspaper even wrote: "Korfball is a monster, that extends its claws to all sides." Later he moved to Baarn where he became head of a school.

Korfball during the 1920 Summer Olympics in Antwerp was a demonstration sport with the help of Broekhuysen. In 1933, he was co-founder of the International Federation of Korfball, the international korfball federation. He remained until 1934 president of the Dutch league and was then honorary chairman.

In 1958 he died at the age of 81 and was buried in Baarn.
