= Handball at the 2021 Junior Pan American Games =

- Handball pictogram
- Venue: Iván Vassilev Todorov Arena
- Location: (Colombia) Cali
- Dates: 23 November – 4 December
- Nations: 9
- Teams: 8 (men); 8 (women)

The handball competition of the 2021 Junior Pan American Games in Cali, Colombia was held from 23 November to 4 December at the Iván Vassilev Todorov Arena, the events were played by U23 national teams and awarded one place in both genders to the handball tournament of the 2023 Pan American Games.

== Participating teams ==
Men

- Argentina
- Brazil
- Chile
- Colombia
- Cuba
- Mexico
- Puerto Rico
- Dominican Republic

Women

- Argentina
- Brazil
- Chile
- Colombia
- Cuba
- Mexico
- Paraguay
- Dominican Republic

== Medal summary ==
=== Medal table ===
Rank	Nation	Gold	Silver	Bronze	Total
1	Argentina	1	1	0	2
2	Brazil	1	0	1	2
3	Paraguay	0	1	0	1
4	Chile	0	0	1	1
Totals (4 entries)		2	2	2	6

== Medalists ==
Event	Gold	Silver	Bronze
Men's tournament	Brazil; Edney Oliveira; Luís Garcia; Marcos Braga; Joel Santos; Luís Da Silva; Lucas Santos; Natan Silva; Leandro Da Silva; Gerson Da Silva; Carlos Santos; Marcos Da Silva; Davi Langaro; Jose Lopes; Tarcísio Oliveira	Argentina; Santiago Giovagnola; Santiago Barcelo; Tomas Marinaro; Tobias Torossian; Franco Mendive; Joaquin Barcelo; Pedro Martinez; Julian Santos; Lautaro Robledo; Juan Villarreal; Agustin Uzner; Catriel Benitez; Martin Jung; Tomas Mera	Chile; Vicente González; Luciano Scaramelli; Rodrigo Aedo; Goran Kegevic; Diego Caro; Francisco Ahumada; Nicolás Moraga; Daniel Montecino; Arian Delgado; Renato Castro; Danilo Salgado; Aaron Codina; Adolfo Navarro; Francisco Aguilera
Women's tournament	Argentina; Anna Azul Aballay; Belen Aizen; Berenice Karin Frelier; Camila Ayelen Pedernera; Carolina Bono; Carolina Aldana Luque; Caterina Benedetti Gorga; Martina Lang; Martina Romero; Sofia Aldana Manzano; Sol Ariadna Azcune; Valentina Learreta; Valentina Menucci; Yamila Aylen Baggio	Paraguay; Ana Yamile Oliveira Cabrera; Fátima Acuña; Fátima Ocampos; Fiorella Olmedo Aranda; Gabriela Benítez Almada; Jazmín Samaniego Benitez; Jazmín Mendoza; Julieta Anahí Chilavert Moreno; Kiara Vergara Martínez; Liliana Acuña; Maggie Lugo Lara; María Paula Fernández; Shelsea Maria Belén Careaga; Sofía Villalba	Brazil; Ana Luiza Fernandes Alves; Fernanda Paulino De Lima; Geandra Leoncio De Souza; Jhennifer Lopes; Karolain Lewandowski; Kauani Bittencourt Klos; Luara Marina De Paula Bastos; Marcela Arounian; Maria Grasielly Brasil Pereira; Maria Paula Lima E Dias; Mariana Araujo Evangelista; Maryanna Rafaela Rodrigues; Ranielle Franca Da Silva; Rebeca Cristini Gregorio Araujo

== Men's tournament ==
=== Preliminary round ===
All times are local (UTC−5).

==== Group A ====
Pos	Team	Pld	W	D	L	GF	GA	GD	Pts	Qualification
1	Brazil	3	3	0	0	117	54	+63	6	Semifinals
2	Chile	3	2	0	1	98	72	+26	4	Semifinals
3	Mexico	3	1	0	2	74	89	−15	2	5–8th place semifinals
4	Puerto Rico	3	0	0	3	53	127	−74	0	5–8th place semifinals

29 November 2021; 09:00	Brazil	38–16	Mexico	Iván Vassilev Todorov Arena, Cali; Attendance: 260; Referees: Augusto, Poulet (USA)
29 November 2021; 09:00	Neto, T. Oliveira 6	(17–7)	Bayardo 6	Iván Vassilev Todorov Arena, Cali; Attendance: 260; Referees: Augusto, Poulet (USA)
29 November 2021; 09:00	1× (yellow card) 2× (suspension)	Report	3× (suspension)	Iván Vassilev Todorov Arena, Cali; Attendance: 260; Referees: Augusto, Poulet (USA)

29 November 2021; 11:40	Chile	44–18	Puerto Rico	Iván Vassilev Todorov Arena, Cali; Attendance: 80; Referees: Burgos, Delgado (ARG)
29 November 2021; 11:40	Salgado 10	(21–10)	three players 4	Iván Vassilev Todorov Arena, Cali; Attendance: 80; Referees: Burgos, Delgado (ARG)
29 November 2021; 11:40	2× (yellow card) 3× (suspension)	Report	3× (suspension)	Iván Vassilev Todorov Arena, Cali; Attendance: 80; Referees: Burgos, Delgado (ARG)

30 November 2021; 09:00	Brazil	49–15	Puerto Rico	Iván Vassilev Todorov Arena, Cali; Attendance: 100; Referees: Coba, Osalde (MEX)
30 November 2021; 09:00	M. da Silva 7	(22–9)	Monge 4	Iván Vassilev Todorov Arena, Cali; Attendance: 100; Referees: Coba, Osalde (MEX)
30 November 2021; 09:00	1× (yellow card)	Report	1× (yellow card) 7× (suspension) 1× (red card)	Iván Vassilev Todorov Arena, Cali; Attendance: 100; Referees: Coba, Osalde (MEX)

30 November 2021; 11:40	Chile	31–24	Mexico	Iván Vassilev Todorov Arena, Cali; Attendance: 200; Referees: Correa B., Correa R. (BRA)
30 November 2021; 11:40	Salgado 9	(14–11)	Márquez 6	Iván Vassilev Todorov Arena, Cali; Attendance: 200; Referees: Correa B., Correa R. (BRA)
30 November 2021; 11:40	1× (yellow card) 5× (suspension) 1× (red card)	Report	2× (yellow card) 7× (suspension)	Iván Vassilev Todorov Arena, Cali; Attendance: 200; Referees: Correa B., Correa R. (BRA)

1 December 2021; 09:00	Brazil	30–23	Chile	Iván Vassilev Todorov Arena, Cali; Attendance: 120; Referees: Burgos, Delgado (ARG)
1 December 2021; 09:00	T. Oliveira 7	(18–11)	Codina 6	Iván Vassilev Todorov Arena, Cali; Attendance: 120; Referees: Burgos, Delgado (ARG)
1 December 2021; 09:00	2× (yellow card) 4× (suspension)	Report	2× (yellow card) 2× (suspension)	Iván Vassilev Todorov Arena, Cali; Attendance: 120; Referees: Burgos, Delgado (ARG)

1 December 2021; 11:40	Mexico	34–20	Puerto Rico	Iván Vassilev Todorov Arena, Cali; Referees: Estrada, Pineda (COL)
1 December 2021; 11:40	Márquez, Rivera 6	(14–11)	K. Ocasio 6	Iván Vassilev Todorov Arena, Cali; Referees: Estrada, Pineda (COL)
1 December 2021; 11:40	1× (yellow card) 1× (suspension)	Report	1× (yellow card) 4× (suspension)	Iván Vassilev Todorov Arena, Cali; Referees: Estrada, Pineda (COL)

==== Group B ====
Pos	Team	Pld	W	D	L	GF	GA	GD	Pts	Qualification
1	Argentina	3	3	0	0	112	64	+48	6	Semifinals
2	Cuba	3	2	0	1	108	103	+5	4	Semifinals
3	Dominican Republic	3	1	0	2	83	114	−31	2	5–8th place semifinals
4	Colombia (H)	3	0	0	3	82	104	−22	0	5–8th place semifinals

(H) Hosts

29 November 2021; 17:00	Argentina	30–19	Colombia	Iván Vassilev Todorov Arena, Cali; Attendance: 350; Referees: Correa B., Correa R. (BRA)
29 November 2021; 17:00	Mendive 6	(13–7)	Bedoya 5	Iván Vassilev Todorov Arena, Cali; Attendance: 350; Referees: Correa B., Correa R. (BRA)
29 November 2021; 17:00	1× (yellow card) 5× (suspension)	Report	1× (yellow card) 5× (suspension)	Iván Vassilev Todorov Arena, Cali; Attendance: 350; Referees: Correa B., Correa R. (BRA)

29 November 2021; 19:40	Cuba	42–30	Dominican Republic	Iván Vassilev Todorov Arena, Cali; Attendance: 350; Referees: Lemes, Sosa (URU)
29 November 2021; 19:40	Almeida 9	(20–16)	Cabrera 7	Iván Vassilev Todorov Arena, Cali; Attendance: 350; Referees: Lemes, Sosa (URU)
29 November 2021; 19:40	1× (yellow card)	Report	1× (yellow card) 8× (suspension) 1× (red card)	Iván Vassilev Todorov Arena, Cali; Attendance: 350; Referees: Lemes, Sosa (URU)

30 November 2021; 17:00	Argentina	42–16	Dominican Republic	Iván Vassilev Todorov Arena, Cali; Attendance: 250; Referees: Lemes, Sosa (URU)
30 November 2021; 17:00	Robledo 7	(19–7)	López 4	Iván Vassilev Todorov Arena, Cali; Attendance: 250; Referees: Lemes, Sosa (URU)
30 November 2021; 17:00	1× (yellow card) 3× (suspension)	Report	2× (yellow card) 3× (suspension) 1× (red card)	Iván Vassilev Todorov Arena, Cali; Attendance: 250; Referees: Lemes, Sosa (URU)

30 November 2021; 19:40	Cuba	37–33	Colombia	Iván Vassilev Todorov Arena, Cali; Attendance: 350; Referees: Correa B., Correa R. (BRA)
30 November 2021; 19:40	Rodríguez 6	(20–11)	Belalcázar 8	Iván Vassilev Todorov Arena, Cali; Attendance: 350; Referees: Correa B., Correa R. (BRA)
30 November 2021; 19:40	3× (yellow card) 6× (suspension) 2× (red card)	Report	6× (suspension)	Iván Vassilev Todorov Arena, Cali; Attendance: 350; Referees: Correa B., Correa R. (BRA)

1 December 2021; 17:00	Argentina	40–29	Cuba	Iván Vassilev Todorov Arena, Cali; Attendance: 150; Referees: Lemes, Sosa (URU)
1 December 2021; 17:00	Robledo 9	(22–16)	Rodríguez 8	Iván Vassilev Todorov Arena, Cali; Attendance: 150; Referees: Lemes, Sosa (URU)
1 December 2021; 17:00	1× (yellow card) 4× (suspension)	Report		Iván Vassilev Todorov Arena, Cali; Attendance: 150; Referees: Lemes, Sosa (URU)

1 December 2021; 19:40	Colombia	30–37	Dominican Republic	Iván Vassilev Todorov Arena, Cali; Attendance: 250; Referees: Coba, Osalde (MEX)
1 December 2021; 19:40	Belalcázar, Rojas 5	(14–17)	López 11	Iván Vassilev Todorov Arena, Cali; Attendance: 250; Referees: Coba, Osalde (MEX)
1 December 2021; 19:40	1× (yellow card) 6× (suspension)	Report	6× (suspension)	Iván Vassilev Todorov Arena, Cali; Attendance: 250; Referees: Coba, Osalde (MEX)

=== Classification round ===
5–8th place semifinals
3 December
Dominican Republic	30
Puerto Rico	24
3 December
Mexico	34
Colombia	31

Fifth place
4 December
Dominican Republic	24
Mexico	36
Seventh place
4 December
Puerto Rico	27
Colombia	32

==== 5–8th place semifinals ====
3 December 2021; 09:00	Dominican Republic	30–24	Puerto Rico	Iván Vassilev Todorov Arena, Cali; Attendance: 100; Referees: Pagoaga, Zambrano (HON)
3 December 2021; 09:00	López 7	(11–9)	Monge 8	Iván Vassilev Todorov Arena, Cali; Attendance: 100; Referees: Pagoaga, Zambrano (HON)
3 December 2021; 09:00	1× (yellow card) 3× (suspension)	Report	2× (suspension)	Iván Vassilev Todorov Arena, Cali; Attendance: 100; Referees: Pagoaga, Zambrano (HON)

3 December 2021; 11:40	Mexico	34–31	Colombia	Iván Vassilev Todorov Arena, Cali; Attendance: 120; Referees: Augusto, Poulet (USA)
3 December 2021; 11:40	Álvarez 7	(17–16)	Melgarejo 11	Iván Vassilev Todorov Arena, Cali; Attendance: 120; Referees: Augusto, Poulet (USA)
3 December 2021; 11:40	1× (yellow card) 6× (suspension)	Report	2× (yellow card) 3× (suspension)	Iván Vassilev Todorov Arena, Cali; Attendance: 120; Referees: Augusto, Poulet (USA)

==== Seventh place game ====
4 December 2021; 09:00	Puerto Rico	27–32	Colombia	Iván Vassilev Todorov Arena, Cali; Attendance: 120; Referees: Coba, Osalde (MEX)
4 December 2021; 09:00	Rodríguez 6	(11–15)	Belalcázar 8	Iván Vassilev Todorov Arena, Cali; Attendance: 120; Referees: Coba, Osalde (MEX)
4 December 2021; 09:00	1× (yellow card) 6× (suspension)	Report	1× (yellow card) 2× (suspension)	Iván Vassilev Todorov Arena, Cali; Attendance: 120; Referees: Coba, Osalde (MEX)

==== Fifth place game ====
4 December 2021; 11:40	Dominican Republic	24–36	Mexico	Iván Vassilev Todorov Arena, Cali; Referees: Pagoaga, Zambrano (HON)
4 December 2021; 11:40	López 11	(14–14)	Pérez 8	Iván Vassilev Todorov Arena, Cali; Referees: Pagoaga, Zambrano (HON)
4 December 2021; 11:40	2× (yellow card) 4× (suspension)	Report	1× (yellow card) 4× (suspension)	Iván Vassilev Todorov Arena, Cali; Referees: Pagoaga, Zambrano (HON)

=== Medal round ===
Semifinals
3 December
Argentina	34
Chile	22
3 December
Brazil	26
Cuba	22

Final
4 December
Argentina	24
Brazil	26
Third place
4 December
Chile (2ET)	37
Cuba	35

==== Semifinals ====
3 December 2021; 17:00	Argentina	34–22	Chile	Iván Vassilev Todorov Arena, Cali; Attendance: 250; Referees: Correa B., Correa R. (BRA)
3 December 2021; 17:00	J. Barceló 9	(18–12)	Salgado 8	Iván Vassilev Todorov Arena, Cali; Attendance: 250; Referees: Correa B., Correa R. (BRA)
3 December 2021; 17:00	2× (yellow card) 3× (suspension)	Report	2× (yellow card) 1× (suspension)	Iván Vassilev Todorov Arena, Cali; Attendance: 250; Referees: Correa B., Correa R. (BRA)

3 December 2021; 19:40	Brazil	26–22	Cuba	Iván Vassilev Todorov Arena, Cali; Referees: Estrada, Pineda (COL)
3 December 2021; 19:40	Garcia 5	(16–12)	Rodríguez 9	Iván Vassilev Todorov Arena, Cali; Referees: Estrada, Pineda (COL)
3 December 2021; 19:40	1× (yellow card) 3× (suspension)	Report	1× (yellow card) 5× (suspension)	Iván Vassilev Todorov Arena, Cali; Referees: Estrada, Pineda (COL)

==== Bronze medal game ====
4 December 2021
15:00
Chile
37–35 (ET)
Cuba
Iván Vassilev Todorov Arena, Cali
Referees: Burgos, Delgado (ARG)
Salgado 11
(14–13)
Rodríguez 10
3× (yellow card) 3× (suspension)
Report
2× (yellow card) 1× (suspension) 1× (red card)

FT: 27–27 ET: 5–5, 5–3

==== Final ====
4 December 2021; 18:40	Argentina	24–26	Brazil	Iván Vassilev Todorov Arena, Cali; Attendance: 500; Referees: Lemes, Sosa (URU)
4 December 2021; 18:40	Mendive, Unzner 5	(13–12)	T. Oliveira 7	Iván Vassilev Todorov Arena, Cali; Attendance: 500; Referees: Lemes, Sosa (URU)
4 December 2021; 18:40	3× (suspension)	Report	1× (yellow card) 3× (suspension) 1× (red card)	Iván Vassilev Todorov Arena, Cali; Attendance: 500; Referees: Lemes, Sosa (URU)

=== Final standing ===
Rank	Team
1st place, gold medalist(s)	Brazil
2nd place, silver medalist(s)	Argentina
3rd place, bronze medalist(s)	Chile
4	Cuba
5	Mexico
6	Dominican Republic
7	Colombia
8	Puerto Rico

Team qualified to the 2023 Pan American Games

== Women's tournament ==
=== Preliminary round ===
All times are local (UTC−5).

==== Group A ====
Pos	Team	Pld	W	D	L	GF	GA	GD	Pts	Qualification
1	Argentina	3	2	1	0	98	61	+37	5	Semifinals
2	Chile	3	2	0	1	85	80	+5	4	Semifinals
3	Mexico	3	1	1	1	96	92	+4	3	5–8th place semifinals
4	Colombia (H)	3	0	0	3	62	108	−46	0	5–8th place semifinals

(H) Hosts

23 November 2021; 09:00	Chile	32–26	Colombia	Iván Vassilev Todorov Arena, Cali; Attendance: 200; Referees: Correa B., Correa R. (BRA)
23 November 2021; 09:00	Muller 7	(17–13)	Córdoba 10	Iván Vassilev Todorov Arena, Cali; Attendance: 200; Referees: Correa B., Correa R. (BRA)
23 November 2021; 09:00	1× (yellow card) 1× (suspension)	Report	4× (suspension)	Iván Vassilev Todorov Arena, Cali; Attendance: 200; Referees: Correa B., Correa R. (BRA)

23 November 2021; 11:40	Argentina	32–32	Mexico	Iván Vassilev Todorov Arena, Cali; Referees: Augusto, Poulet (USA)
23 November 2021; 11:40	Lang 8	(15–16)	Leal 9	Iván Vassilev Todorov Arena, Cali; Referees: Augusto, Poulet (USA)
23 November 2021; 11:40	1× (yellow card) 3× (suspension)	Report	1× (yellow card) 5× (suspension)	Iván Vassilev Todorov Arena, Cali; Referees: Augusto, Poulet (USA)

24 November 2021; 09:00	Chile	36–29	Mexico	Iván Vassilev Todorov Arena, Cali; Attendance: 150; Referees: Burgos, Delgado (ARG)
24 November 2021; 09:00	Lovera 8	(14–10)	López 7	Iván Vassilev Todorov Arena, Cali; Attendance: 150; Referees: Burgos, Delgado (ARG)
24 November 2021; 09:00	1× (yellow card) 5× (suspension)	Report	1× (yellow card) 5× (suspension)	Iván Vassilev Todorov Arena, Cali; Attendance: 150; Referees: Burgos, Delgado (ARG)

24 November 2021; 11:40	Argentina	41–12	Colombia	Iván Vassilev Todorov Arena, Cali; Attendance: 200; Referees: Pagoaga, Zambrano (HON)
24 November 2021; 11:40	Pedernera 8	(21–5)	Córdoba 5	Iván Vassilev Todorov Arena, Cali; Attendance: 200; Referees: Pagoaga, Zambrano (HON)
24 November 2021; 11:40	1× (yellow card) 2× (suspension)	Report	7× (suspension) 1× (red card)	Iván Vassilev Todorov Arena, Cali; Attendance: 200; Referees: Pagoaga, Zambrano (HON)

25 November 2021; 07:40	Chile	17–25	Argentina	Iván Vassilev Todorov Arena, Cali; Attendance: 120; Referees: Correa B., Correa R. (BRA)
25 November 2021; 07:40	three players 3	(8–11)	Baggio, Frelier 5	Iván Vassilev Todorov Arena, Cali; Attendance: 120; Referees: Correa B., Correa R. (BRA)
25 November 2021; 07:40	2× (suspension)	Report	2× (yellow card) 2× (suspension)	Iván Vassilev Todorov Arena, Cali; Attendance: 120; Referees: Correa B., Correa R. (BRA)

25 November 2021; 10:20	Colombia	24–35	Mexico	Iván Vassilev Todorov Arena, Cali; Attendance: 150; Referees: Augusto, Poulet (USA)
25 November 2021; 10:20	Arcila, Córdoba 5	(10–17)	Pereira, Vargas 5	Iván Vassilev Todorov Arena, Cali; Attendance: 150; Referees: Augusto, Poulet (USA)
25 November 2021; 10:20	2× (yellow card) 4× (suspension)	Report	2× (suspension)	Iván Vassilev Todorov Arena, Cali; Attendance: 150; Referees: Augusto, Poulet (USA)

==== Group B ====
Pos	Team	Pld	W	D	L	GF	GA	GD	Pts	Qualification
1	Paraguay	3	2	0	1	101	71	+30	4 (Note: Paraguay 2 Pts, +16 GD; Brazil 2 Pts, 0 GD; Cuba 2 Pts, –16 GD)	Semifinals
2	Brazil	3	2	0	1	91	65	+26	4	Semifinals
3	Cuba	3	2	0	1	96	96	0	4	5–8th place semifinals
4	Dominican Republic	3	0	0	3	67	123	−56	0	5–8th place semifinals

Notes:

23 November 2021; 17:00	Brazil	29–30	Cuba	Iván Vassilev Todorov Arena, Cali; Attendance: 150; Referees: Burgos, Delgado (ARG)
23 November 2021; 17:00	Paulino 6	(15–14)	Toledo 13	Iván Vassilev Todorov Arena, Cali; Attendance: 150; Referees: Burgos, Delgado (ARG)
23 November 2021; 17:00	1× (yellow card) 5× (suspension)	Report	3× (suspension)	Iván Vassilev Todorov Arena, Cali; Attendance: 150; Referees: Burgos, Delgado (ARG)

23 November 2021; 19:40	Paraguay	40–26	Dominican Republic	Iván Vassilev Todorov Arena, Cali; Referees: Lemes, Sosa (URU)
23 November 2021; 19:40	F. Acuña 9	(20–10)	Wattley 7	Iván Vassilev Todorov Arena, Cali; Referees: Lemes, Sosa (URU)
23 November 2021; 19:40	1× (yellow card) 3× (suspension)	Report	10× (suspension) 1× (red card)	Iván Vassilev Todorov Arena, Cali; Referees: Lemes, Sosa (URU)

24 November 2021; 19:40	Paraguay	40–23	Cuba	Iván Vassilev Todorov Arena, Cali; Attendance: 215; Referees: Correa B., Correa R. (BRA)
24 November 2021; 19:40	F. Acuña 12	(21–10)	Rosabal 8	Iván Vassilev Todorov Arena, Cali; Attendance: 215; Referees: Correa B., Correa R. (BRA)
24 November 2021; 19:40	1× (yellow card) 1× (suspension)	Report	3× (suspension) 1× (red card)	Iván Vassilev Todorov Arena, Cali; Attendance: 215; Referees: Correa B., Correa R. (BRA)

25 November 2021; 13:00	Brazil	22–21	Paraguay	Iván Vassilev Todorov Arena, Cali; Attendance: 316; Referees: Lemes, Sosa (URU)
25 November 2021; 13:00	Arounian 6	(14–10)	Fernández 8	Iván Vassilev Todorov Arena, Cali; Attendance: 316; Referees: Lemes, Sosa (URU)
25 November 2021; 13:00	1× (yellow card) 2× (suspension)	Report	3× (suspension)	Iván Vassilev Todorov Arena, Cali; Attendance: 316; Referees: Lemes, Sosa (URU)

25 November 2021; 15:40	Cuba	43–27	Dominican Republic	Iván Vassilev Todorov Arena, Cali; Attendance: 150; Referees: Coba, Osalde (MEX)
25 November 2021; 15:40	Rosabal 14	(18–11)	Wattley 7	Iván Vassilev Todorov Arena, Cali; Attendance: 150; Referees: Coba, Osalde (MEX)
25 November 2021; 15:40	1× (yellow card) 3× (suspension) 1× (red card)	Report	1× (yellow card) 10× (suspension) 1× (red card)	Iván Vassilev Todorov Arena, Cali; Attendance: 150; Referees: Coba, Osalde (MEX)

26 November 2021; 10:00	Brazil	40–14	Dominican Republic	Iván Vassilev Todorov Arena, Cali; Attendance: 200; Referees: Coba, Osalde (MEX)
26 November 2021; 10:00	Araújo 6	(19–8)	Wattley 5	Iván Vassilev Todorov Arena, Cali; Attendance: 200; Referees: Coba, Osalde (MEX)
26 November 2021; 10:00		Report	1× (yellow card) 5× (suspension)	Iván Vassilev Todorov Arena, Cali; Attendance: 200; Referees: Coba, Osalde (MEX)

=== Classification round ===
5–8th place semifinals
27 November
Cuba	39
Colombia	30
27 November
Mexico	32
Dominican Republic	28

Fifth place
28 November
Cuba	39
Mexico	36
Seventh place
28 November
Colombia (pen.)	32
Dominican Republic	31

==== 5–8th place semifinals ====
27 November 2021; 09:00	Cuba	39–30	Colombia	Iván Vassilev Todorov Arena, Cali; Attendance: 120; Referees: Coba, Osalde (MEX)
27 November 2021; 09:00	González, Rosabal 7	(15–10)	Asprilla 7	Iván Vassilev Todorov Arena, Cali; Attendance: 120; Referees: Coba, Osalde (MEX)
27 November 2021; 09:00	2× (yellow card) 3× (suspension)	Report	1× (yellow card) 2× (suspension)	Iván Vassilev Todorov Arena, Cali; Attendance: 120; Referees: Coba, Osalde (MEX)

27 November 2021; 11:40	Mexico	32–28	Dominican Republic	Iván Vassilev Todorov Arena, Cali; Attendance: 235; Referees: Pagoaga, Zambrano (HON)
27 November 2021; 11:40	Tapia 10	(11–14)	Liranzo 10	Iván Vassilev Todorov Arena, Cali; Attendance: 235; Referees: Pagoaga, Zambrano (HON)
27 November 2021; 11:40	6× (suspension)	Report	3× (yellow card) 7× (suspension)	Iván Vassilev Todorov Arena, Cali; Attendance: 235; Referees: Pagoaga, Zambrano (HON)

==== Seventh place game ====
28 November 2021
09:00
Colombia
32–31
Dominican Republic
Iván Vassilev Todorov Arena, Cali
Referees: Coba, Osalde (MEX)
Córdoba 9
(13–18)
Liranzo 8
2× (suspension)
Report
3× (suspension)

FT: 28–28 Pen: 4–3

==== Fifth place game ====
28 November 2021; 11:40	Cuba	39–36	Mexico	Iván Vassilev Todorov Arena, Cali; Attendance: 122; Referees: Augusto, Poulet (USA)
28 November 2021; 11:40	N. Rodríguez, Rosabal 10	(18–16)	Pereira 11	Iván Vassilev Todorov Arena, Cali; Attendance: 122; Referees: Augusto, Poulet (USA)
28 November 2021; 11:40	3× (suspension)	Report	3× (suspension)	Iván Vassilev Todorov Arena, Cali; Attendance: 122; Referees: Augusto, Poulet (USA)

=== Medal round ===
Semifinals
27 November
Paraguay	31
Chile	26
27 November
Argentina	23
Brazil	21

Final
28 November
Paraguay	24
Argentina	27
Third place
28 November
Chile	19
Brazil	30

==== Semifinals ====
27 November 2021; 17:00	Paraguay	31–26	Chile	Iván Vassilev Todorov Arena, Cali; Attendance: 300; Referees: Burgos, Delgado (ARG)
27 November 2021; 17:00	Villalba 8	(16–11)	Lovera 5	Iván Vassilev Todorov Arena, Cali; Attendance: 300; Referees: Burgos, Delgado (ARG)
27 November 2021; 17:00	1× (yellow card) 3× (suspension)	Report	2× (suspension) 1× (red card)	Iván Vassilev Todorov Arena, Cali; Attendance: 300; Referees: Burgos, Delgado (ARG)

27 November 2021; 19:40	Argentina	23–21	Brazil	Iván Vassilev Todorov Arena, Cali; Attendance: 250; Referees: Sosa, Lemes (URU)
27 November 2021; 19:40	Bono 8	(12–10)	Paulino 6	Iván Vassilev Todorov Arena, Cali; Attendance: 250; Referees: Sosa, Lemes (URU)
27 November 2021; 19:40	1× (yellow card) 2× (suspension)	Report	1× (yellow card) 4× (suspension)	Iván Vassilev Todorov Arena, Cali; Attendance: 250; Referees: Sosa, Lemes (URU)

==== Bronze medal game ====
28 November 2021; 15:00	Chile	19–30	Brazil	Iván Vassilev Todorov Arena, Cali; Attendance: 230; Referees: Burgos, Delgado (ARG)
28 November 2021; 15:00	Muller 5	(11–12)	Paulino 7	Iván Vassilev Todorov Arena, Cali; Attendance: 230; Referees: Burgos, Delgado (ARG)
28 November 2021; 15:00	1× (yellow card) 2× (suspension)	Report	1× (yellow card) 5× (suspension)	Iván Vassilev Todorov Arena, Cali; Attendance: 230; Referees: Burgos, Delgado (ARG)

==== Final ====
28 November 2021; 18:40	Paraguay	24–27	Argentina	Iván Vassilev Todorov Arena, Cali; Attendance: 500; Referees: Correa B., Correa R. (BRA)
28 November 2021; 18:40	F. Acuña 9	(12–12)	Lang 8	Iván Vassilev Todorov Arena, Cali; Attendance: 500; Referees: Correa B., Correa R. (BRA)
28 November 2021; 18:40	1× (yellow card) 3× (suspension)	Report	3× (suspension)	Iván Vassilev Todorov Arena, Cali; Attendance: 500; Referees: Correa B., Correa R. (BRA)

=== Final standing ===
Rank	Team
1st place, gold medalist(s)	Argentina
2nd place, silver medalist(s)	Paraguay
3rd place, bronze medalist(s)	Brazil
4	Chile
5	Cuba
6	Mexico
7	Colombia
8	Dominican Republic

Team qualified to the 2023 Pan American Games
