= Korfball at the 2013 World Games =

2013 World Games - Korfball
Host	(Colombia) Cali
Dates	July 31–August 4, 2013
Teams	8
Podium
Champions	Netherlands
Runners-up	Belgium
Third place	Chinese Taipei
Fourth place	Portugal

The Korfball event at the World Games 2013 took place at the Iván Vassilev Todorov Arena (Cauca Valley University Coliseum), a sport arena in Cali purpose-built for Korfball, from Wednesday, July 31 to Sunday, August 4, 2013.

== Teams ==
Pool A
Czech Republic
Great Britain
Netherlands
Portugal

Pool B
Belgium
Chinese Taipei
Germany
Russia

== Pool matches ==
Pos	Team	Pld	W	OTW	OTL	L	GF	GA	GD	Pts	Qualification
1	Netherlands	3	3	0	0	0	119	56	+63	9	Semifinals
2	Portugal	3	2	0	0	1	59	73	−14	6	Semifinals
3	Czech Republic	3	1	0	0	2	55	80	−25	3	Finals for 5th–8th places
4	Great Britain	3	0	0	0	3	53	77	−24	0	Finals for 5th–8th places

First match(es) will be played: 31 July 2013. Source:

July 31	Netherlands	38-18	Portugal	Details
July 31	Great Britain	17-18	Czech Republic	Details
August 1	Great Britain	19-39	Netherlands	Details
August 1	Portugal	21-18	Czech Republic	Details
August 2	Netherlands	42-19	Czech Republic	Details
August 2	Great Britain	17-20	Portugal	Details

POOL B	Pts	P	W	L	GF	GA	GD
Belgium	9	3	3	0	89	43	+46
Chinese Taipei	6	3	2	1	67	61	+6
Germany	3	3	1	2	41	70	-29
Russia	0	3	0	3	50	73	-23

July 31	Belgium	30-15	Russia	Details
July 31	Chinese Taipei	22-15	Germany	Details
August 1	Chinese Taipei	21-26	Belgium	Details
August 1	Russia	15-19	Germany	Details
August 2	Chinese Taipei	24-20	Russia	Details
August 2	Belgium	33-7	Germany	Details

== Semifinals ==
5th-8th places

August 3, 2013 - 14:30
August 3, 2013 - 14:30	Germany	16-17	Great Britain	Details

August 3, 2013 - 16:20
August 3, 2013 - 16:20	Czech Republic	21-28	Russia	Details

Semifinals

August 3, 2013 - 18:10
August 3, 2013 - 18:10	Belgium	29-9	Portugal	Details

August 3, 2013 - 20:00
August 3, 2013 - 20:00	Netherlands	40-14	Chinese Taipei	Details

== Finals ==
August 4, 2013 - 08:30
August 4, 2013 - 08:30	Germany	26-27	Czech Republic	Details

August 4, 2013 - 10:30
August 4, 2013 - 10:30	Great Britain	19-14	Russia	Details

August 4, 2013 - 12:30
August 4, 2013 - 12:30	Portugal	14-18	Chinese Taipei	Details

August 4, 2013 - 14:30
August 4, 2013 - 14:30	Belgium	19-25	Netherlands	Details

Semi-finals
Belgium	29
Portugal	9
Netherlands	40
Chinese Taipei	14

Final
Belgium	19
Netherlands	25
Third place
Portugal	14
Chinese Taipei	18

Champions
Netherlands

== Final standings ==
Rank	Team
Gold medal	Netherlands
Silver medal	Belgium
Bronze medal	Chinese Taipei
4.	Portugal
5.	Great Britain
6.	Russia
7.	Czech Republic
8.	Germany
