= Suriname national korfball team =

National sports team

Suriname
- Association: Suriname Korfball Federation (SKF)
- IKF membership: 2017
- IKF code: SUR (Suriname)
- IKF rank: 8 (Jan.2025)

World Championships
- Appearances: 2
- First appearance: 2019
- Best result: 2023 (5th place)

Pan-American Championship
- Appearances: 2
- First appearance: 2018
- Best result: 2018, 2022 (1st Place)

The Suriname national korfball team is managed by the Suriname Korfball Federation (SKF), representing Suriname in korfball international competitions. It participated in its first international korfball competition in 2018.

== Tournament history ==
World Games
Year	Games	Host	Classification
2022	2022 World Games	Birmingham (USA)	6th place
2025	2025 World Games	Chengdu (China)	5th place

World Championships
Year	Championship	Host	Classification
2019	11th World Championship	Durban (South-Africa)	6th place
2023	12th World Championship	Taipei (Taiwan)	5th place

Pan-American Korfball Championship
Year	Championship	Host	Classification
2018	2nd Pan-American Championship	Cali (Colombia)	1st place
2022	3rd Pan-American Championship	Buenos Aires (Argentina)	1st place
