= Korfball =

Mixed gender team sport

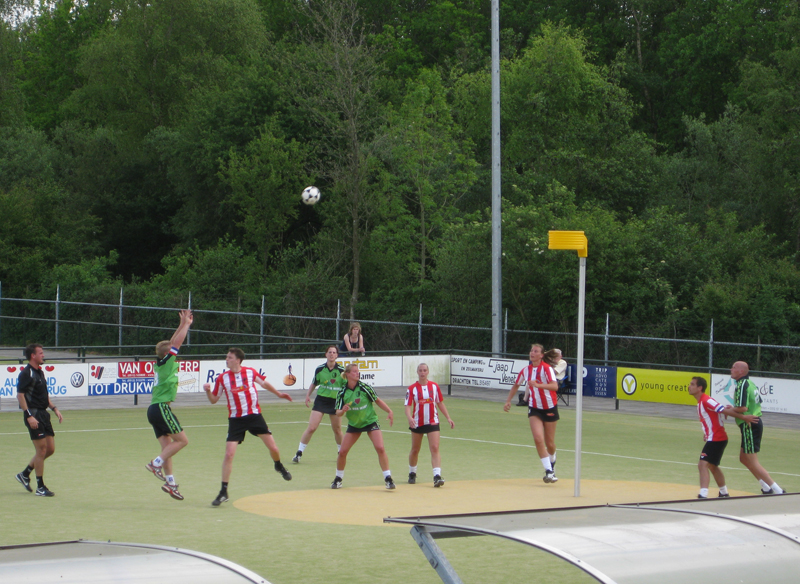
- Outdoor korfball match in the Netherlands
- Highest governing body: International Korfball Federation
- First played: 1902

Characteristics
- Contact: Limited
- Team members: 8 per side: 4 male players and 4 female players
- Mixed-sex: Yes
- Type: Team sport, ball sport
- Equipment: Korfball
- Venue: Korfball court

Presence
- Olympic: Demonstration sport in 1920 and 1928
- World Games: 1985–present

Korfball (Dutch: korfbal [ˈkɔr(ə)vbɑl]) is a ball sport with similarities to netball, basketball, and ringball. The objective is to throw a ball into a netless basket that is mounted on a 3.5 m (11.5-foot) pole. Each team is composed of four female players and four male players. The sport was created in the Netherlands in 1902 by schoolteacher Nico Broekhuysen, and has since spread globally.

== History ==
In 1901, Dutch schoolteacher Nico Broekhuysen travelled to the Swedish town of Nääs to take an educational course on teaching gymnastics to children. While there, he was introduced to ringboll. The objective of this Swedish game was to score points by throwing a ball through a ring attached to a pole that was 3 metres (9.8 ft) in height. The field below was divided into three zones, and each player was confined to his or her assigned zone. Men and women played together. Upon Broekhuysen's return to Amsterdam, he began to teach his students a modified version of ringboll. Broekhuysen replaced the ring with a basket to make it easier to see whether the ball had gone through it and scored a point. With his young students in mind, he also simplified the rules.

The name korfball derives from korf, a Dutch word meaning 'basket'.

Korfball was featured as a demonstration sport in the Summer Olympics of 1920 and 1928. It has been included in the World Games since 1985.

The International Korfball Federation (IKF) was founded in 1933 in Antwerp, Belgium. IKF World Korfball Championships have been held every four years since 1978. The most successful countries at these competitions have been the Netherlands, Belgium, and Taiwan. The IKF announced in March 2022 that due to Russia's invasion of Ukraine, the Russian Korfball Federation would not be invited to any international competition until further notice, effectively banning Russian athletes from such events. Furthermore, the Russian Korfball Federation would not be eligible to bid to host any IKF event, nor were any IKF events planned to be held in Russia.

As of 2022, korfball is played in 69 countries and on every populated continent. In the Netherlands, there are approximately 500 clubs and more than 90,000 players.

The oldest korfball club that is still in existence, and has never merged with another, is HKC ALO in The Hague, having been founded on 1 February 1906.

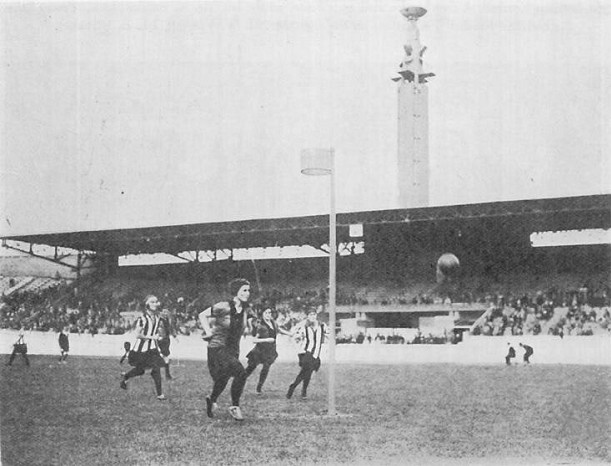
Korfball match at the 1928 Summer Olympics in the Olympic Stadium in Amsterdam

1933 korfball match

== Rules and regulations ==
=== Equipment ===
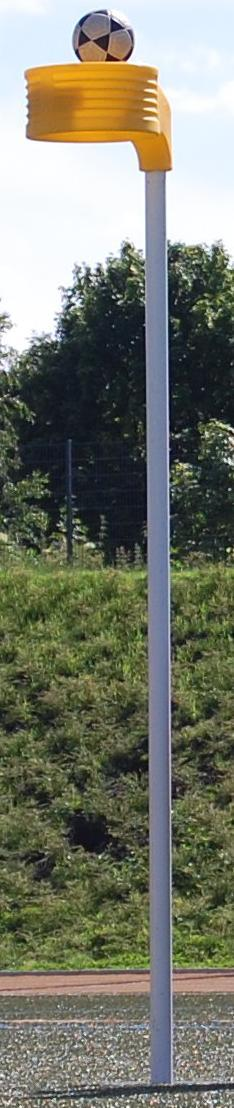
Korf and ball

Korfball is played inside in winter and outdoors in spring, summer and autumn.

The size of the indoor court is 20 m × 40 m (22 yd × 44 yd), as are most outdoor courts. The court is divided into halves called zones. In each zone is a 3.5 m (11 ft) tall post with a basket at the top. This is positioned two-thirds of the distance between the center line and the back of the zone.

The ball is very similar to the one used in association football, with a circumference of 68.0-70.5 cm (or diameter of 21.75-22.45 cm), a weight of 445-475 grams, and a bounce height of 1.10-1.30 meters when dropped from a height of 1.80 meters.

Korfball field diagram

=== Team ===
A korfball team consists of eight players: four female and four male.

=== Match ===
An international korfball match typically consists of two halves or four periods, with the length varying depending on the competition. When the match consists of halves, the duration is typically 25 minutes, with periods typically between 7 and 10 minutes, with a one-minute break between the first and second periods and between the third and fourth periods. At half time the break is five or ten minutes.

Four players of each team are in one zone and the other four are in the other zone. Within each zone, a player may only defend a member of the opposite team of the same gender.

At the beginning of the match, one team chooses a particular half of the court. That half will be that team's defending zone, with "their" basket in it. Players score by throwing the ball through the opposing team's basket. After two goals, the teams change zones: defenders become attackers and attackers become defenders. In between those zone-changes, attackers cannot set foot on their defending zone or vice versa. At half time the teams swap halves of the court.

The rules prevent physical strength dominating the game. Blocking, tackling, and holding are not allowed, nor is kicking the ball.

Once a player has the ball, that player cannot dribble or walk with it; however, the player can move one foot as long as the foot on which the player landed when catching the ball stays in the same spot. Therefore, tactical and efficient teamwork is required, because players need each other in order to keep the ball moving.

A player may not attempt to score when defended, which occurs when the defender is in between the opponent and the basket, is facing his/her opponent, or is within arm's length and attempting to block the ball. This rule encourages fast movement while also limiting the impact of players' height compared to their opponents.

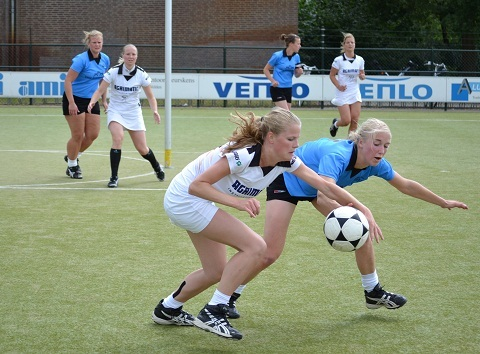
Korfball match in the Netherlands

Outdoor Korfball

== International tournaments ==
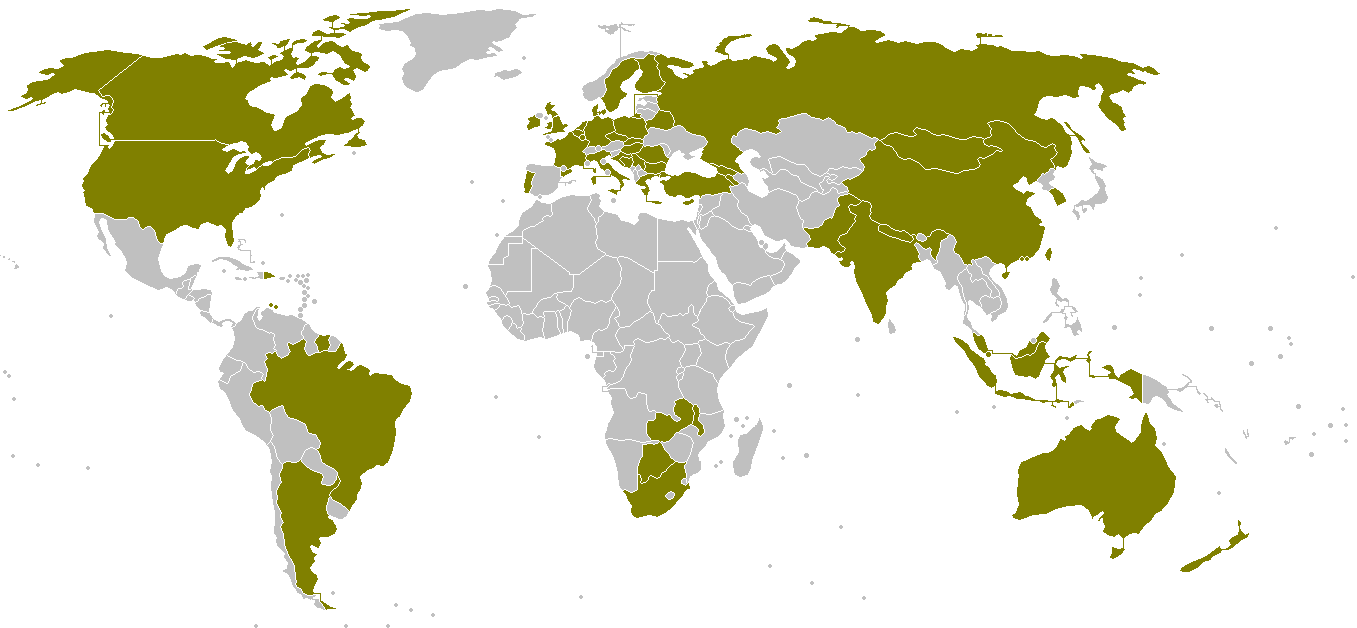
Members of the International Korfball Federation

=== World Games ===
The national teams competition organized by the International World Games Association has been played roughly every four years since 1981.

	Year	Host	Champion	Second place	Third place
II Details	1985	United Kingdom	Netherlands	Belgium	West Germany
III Details	1989	West Germany	Netherlands	Belgium	West Germany
IV Details	1993	Netherlands	Netherlands	Belgium	Germany
V Details	1997	Finland	Netherlands	Belgium	Chinese Taipei
VI Details	2001	Japan	Netherlands	Belgium	Chinese Taipei
VII Details	2005	Germany	Netherlands	Belgium	Czech Republic
VIII Details	2009	Taiwan	Netherlands	Belgium	Chinese Taipei
VIII Details	2013	Colombia	Netherlands	Belgium	Chinese Taipei
IX Details	2017	Poland	Netherlands	Chinese Taipei	Belgium
X Details	2022	United States	Netherlands	Belgium	Chinese Taipei
XI Details	2025	China	Netherlands	Belgium	Chinese Taipei

=== IKF World Korfball Championship ===
The national teams competition organized by the International Korfball Federation has been played roughly every four years since 1978.

	Year	Host	Champion	Second place	Third place
I Details	1978	Netherlands	Netherlands	Belgium	West Germany
II Details	1984	Belgium	Netherlands	Belgium	West Germany
III Details	1987	Netherlands	Netherlands	Belgium	Great Britain
IV Details	1991	Belgium	Belgium	Netherlands	Chinese Taipei
V Details	1995	India	Netherlands	Belgium	Portugal
VI Details	1999	Australia	Netherlands	Belgium	Great Britain
VII Details	2003	Netherlands	Netherlands	Belgium	Czech Republic
VIII Details	2007	Czech Republic	Netherlands	Belgium	Czech Republic
IX Details	2011	China	Netherlands	Belgium	Chinese Taipei
X Details	2015	Belgium	Netherlands	Belgium	Chinese Taipei
XI Details	2019	South Africa	Netherlands	Belgium	Chinese Taipei
XII Details	2023	Chinese Taipei	Netherlands	Chinese Taipei	Belgium

=== IKF U23 World Korfball Championship ===
- 2008 Kaohsiung, Taiwan – Winner: Netherlands
- 2012 Barcelona, Spain – Winner: Netherlands
- 2016 Olomouc, Czech Republic – Winner: Netherlands

=== Continental championships ===
IKF promotes four continental championships: European Korfball Championship, All-Africa Korfball Championship, Pan-American Korfball Championship and Asia-Oceania Korfball Championship.

=== International club competitions ===
The IKF used to organize the Europa Cup competition for national champions (clubs) every year. The Europa Cup was organized for the first time in 1967, and was won by Ons Eibernest from the Netherlands. The winner of the last edition was Fortuna/Delta Logistiek, which won the 2020 edition.

PKC from Papendrecht, the Netherlands, have won the championship the most times, a record 12 wins in total.

Until now, the winning team was either from the Netherlands or Belgium, with respectively 45 and 6 Europa Cups. The only club from the United Kingdom to reach the final was Mitcham Korfball Club from London. Mitcham lost the final against Catbavrienden from Belgium in 1998.

On 25 January 2022 IKF announced the introduction of the IKF Europe Korfball Champions League meant as a replacement for the IKF Europa Cup and IKF Europa Shield competitions. The first edition of the competition was the 2022/2023 edition.

== Beach korfball ==
For beach korfball, the rules of the game differ slightly from those of regular korfball. Each team has 4 starting players and up to 4 substitutes. The field of play is 20 metres by 10 metres, and goals are to be placed 4 metres from the end line. Matches consist of two halves of 6 minutes with a 1-minute rest.

Each team has 4 players in the field, two men and two women. Players can be substituted at any time. Furthermore, if a goal is scored from a 2-point zone, a two-point goal is awarded. Free shots can both be executed at the standard Free Shot line, or at the spot where the fault was made by the opponent.

=== IKF World Beach Korfball Championship ===
	Year	Host	Champion	Second place	Third place
I Details	2022	Nador, Morocco	Poland	Portugal	Belgium
II Details	2024	Pattaya, Thailand	Netherlands	Chinese Taipei	Czech Republic
III Details	2026	Hainan, China	Belgium	Hungary	Netherlands

IKF Beach Korfball World Cup (Regional)

	Year	Region	Host	Champion	Second place	Third place
I	2017	Europe	The Hague, Netherlands	Netherlands	Portugal	Belgium
II	2018	Europe	Blankenberge, Belgium	Belgium	Portugal	Poland
III	2019	Asia	Hong Kong	Chinese Taipei	China	Hong Kong
IV	2019	Europe	Bonson, France	Portugal	Netherlands	Belgium
V	2023	Asia	Pattaya, Thailand	Chinese Taipei	Thailand	United States
VI	2023	Europe	Wrocław, Poland	Belgium	Netherlands	Poland
VII	2024	Europe	Temse, Belgium	Netherlands	Poland	Belgium
VIII	2024	Asia	Bangkok, Thailand	Chinese Taipei	Czech Republic	Poland
IX	2025	Europe	Stockholm, Sweden	Netherlands	Czech Republic	Hungary

== Cultural references ==
- Korfball is the theme of the song "Joy in Leeuwarden (We Are Ready)" on the album 90 Bisodol (Crimond) by Half Man Half Biscuit.
- "Korfball", the fourth episode of the FOX television series Going Dutch, centres around a korfball match between American soldiers and Dutch villagers.

== See also ==
- British Student Korfball Nationals
- Commonwealth Korfball Championships
- Korfball Europa Shield
- Korfball European Bowl
- Korfbal League
