= De Vries–Fransen van de Putte cabinet =

Cabinet of the Netherlands, 1872 to 1874

- Cabinet of the Netherlands
- Date formed: 6 July 1872
- Date dissolved: 27 August 1873 (Demissionary from 20 June 1873)

People and organisations
- Head of state: King William III
- Head of government: Gerrit de Vries
- Deputy head of government: Isaäc Dignus Fransen van de Putte
- No. of ministers: 7
- Ministers removed: 2
- Total no. of members: 9
- Member party: Independent Liberals (Ind. Lib.)
- Status in legislature: Centre-right Minority government

History
- Predecessor: Third Thorbecke cabinet
- Successor: Heemskerk–Van Lynden van Sandenburg cabinet

The De Vries–Fransen van de Putte cabinet was the cabinet of the Netherlands from 6 July 1872 until 27 August 1873. The cabinet was formed by Independent Liberals (Ind. Lib.) after the death of Prime Minister Johan Rudolph Thorbecke on 4 June 1872. The Centre-right cabinet was a majority government in the House of Representatives. Independent Liberal Conservative Gerrit de Vries was Prime Minister.

== Cabinet members ==
Cabinet members
Ministers		Title/Ministry		Term of office	Party
Gerrit de Vries	Dr. Gerrit de Vries (Prime Minister) (1818–1900)	Prime Minister		6 July 1872 – 27 August 1874	Independent; Liberal (Classical Liberal)
Gerrit de Vries	Dr. Gerrit de Vries (Prime Minister) (1818–1900)	Minister	Justice	6 July 1872 – 27 August 1874	Independent; Liberal (Classical Liberal)
Johan Herman Geertsema	Johan Herman; Geertsema (1816–1908)	Minister	Interior	6 July 1872 – 27 August 1874	Independent; Liberal (Classical Liberal)
Louis Gericke van Herwijnen	Baron; Louis Gericke van Herwijnen (1814–1899)	Minister	Foreign Affairs	18 January 1871 – 27 August 1874^{[Retained]}	Independent; Liberal (Classical Liberal)
Albert van Delden	Albert van Delden (1828–1898)	Minister	Finance	6 July 1872 – 27 August 1874	Independent; Liberal (Classical Liberal)
Menno David van Limburg Stirum	Count; Major general Menno David van Limburg Stirum (1807–1891)	Minister	War	6 July 1872 – 15 September 1873^{[Res]}	Independent; Liberal (Classical Liberal)
	Lodewijk Gerard Brocx (1819–1880)	Minister	War	15 September 1873 – 6 October 1873^{[Ad interim]}	Independent; Liberal (Classical Liberal)
August Willem Philip Weitzel	Major general August Willem; Philip Weitzel (1816–1896)	Minister	War	6 October 1873 – 29 April 1875	Independent; Liberal (Conservative Liberal)
	Lodewijk Gerard Brocx (1819–1880)	Minister	Navy	4 June 1868 – 18 December 1873^{[Retained]} ^{[Res]}	Independent; Liberal (Classical Liberal)
Isaäc Dignus Fransen van de Putte	Isaäc Dignus Fransen van de Putte (1822–1902)	Minister	Navy	18 December 1873 – 16 May 1874^{[Ad interim]}	Independent; Liberal (Social Liberal)
	Willem Frederik van Erp Taalman Kip (1824–1905)	Minister	Navy	16 May 1874 – 3 November 1877	Independent; Liberal (Conservative Liberal)
Isaäc Dignus Fransen van de Putte	Isaäc Dignus Fransen van de Putte (1822–1902)	Minister	Colonial Affairs	6 July 1872 – 27 August 1874	Independent; Liberal (Social Liberal)

^{Res} Resigned.
^{Ad interim} Served ad interim.
^{Retained} Retained this position from the previous cabinet.
