= Third Thorbecke cabinet =

Cabinet of the Netherlands, 1871 to 1872

- Cabinet of the Netherlands
- Date formed: 4 January 1871
- Date dissolved: 6 July 1872 (Demissionary from 6 June 1872)

People and organisations
- Head of state: King William III
- Head of government: Johan Rudolph Thorbecke
- Deputy head of government: Pieter Philip van Bosse (Unofficially)
- No. of ministers: 7
- Ministers removed: 3
- Total no. of members: 9
- Member party: Independent Liberals (Ind. Lib.)
- Status in legislature: Centre-right Minority government

History
- Election: 1871 election
- Predecessor: Van Bosse–Fock cabinet
- Successor: De Vries–Fransen van de Putte cabinet

The Third Thorbecke cabinet was the cabinet of the Netherlands from 4 January 1871 until 6 July 1872. The cabinet was formed by Independent Liberals (Ind. Lib.). The Centre-right cabinet was a minority government in the House of Representatives. Independent Liberal Johan Rudolph Thorbecke was chairman of the Council of Ministers.

== Cabinet members ==
Portrait	Name	Position	Term of office	Party
Johan Rudolph Thorbecke	Dr. Johan Rudolph Thorbecke (1798–1872)	Chairman of the Council of Ministers; Minister of the Interior	4 January 1871 – 4 June 1872; Died in office	Independent (Liberal)
Pieter Philip van Bosse	Pieter Philip van Bosse (1809–1879)	Minister of the Interior	4 June 1872 – 6 July 1872; Served ad interim	Independent (Liberal)
Louis Gericke van Herwijnen	Baron; Louis Gericke van Herwijnen (1814–1899)	Minister of Foreign Affairs	18 January 1871 – 27 August 1874	Independent (Liberal)
	Pieter Blussé van Oud-Alblas (1812–1887)	Minister of Finance	4 January 1871 – 6 July 1872	Independent (Liberal)
	Jolle Albertus Jolles (1814–1882)	Minister of Justice	4 January 1871 – 6 July 1872	Independent (Liberal)
Gerardus Petrus Booms	Colonel; Gerardus Petrus Booms (1822–1897)	Minister of War	4 January 1871 – 28 January 1871; Resigned	Independent (Liberal)
Adriaan Engelvaart	Major general Adriaan Engelvaart (1812–1893)	Minister of War	28 January 1871 – 23 December 1871; Resigned	Independent (Liberal)
	Lodewijk Gerard Brocx (1819–1880)	Minister of War	23 December 1871 – 5 February 1872; Served ad interim	Independent (Liberal)
	Major general Félix Delprat (1812–1888)	Minister of War	5 February 1872 – 6 July 1872	Independent (Liberal)
	Lodewijk Gerard Brocx (1819–1880)	Minister of the Navy	4 June 1868 – 18 December 1873; Retained position from the previous cabinet	Independent (Liberal)
Pieter Philip van Bosse	Pieter Philip van Bosse (1809–1879)	Minister of Colonial Affairs	4 January 1871 – 6 July 1872	Independent (Liberal)
