= Grietman =

Frisian political title

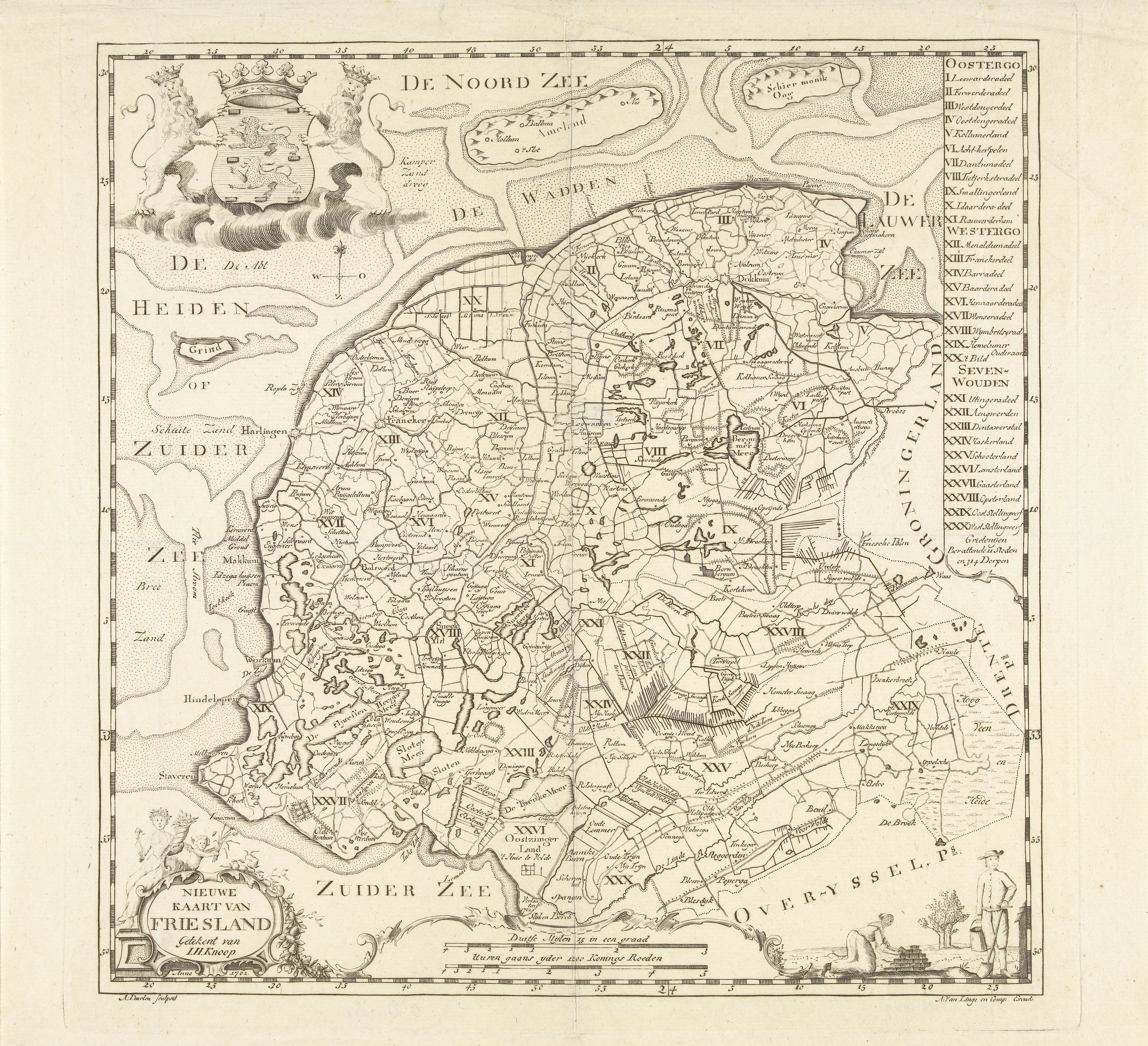
A 1762 etching map of Friesland by Johann Hermann Knoop, printed by A. Durleu and published by A. van Linge & Co, features the coat of arms, a legend of regions, and a woman stacking peat plagues, with a collector’s mark and dimensions of 340 mm × 340 mm.

A grietman or grytman (from Old Frisian greta to accuse, to indict) was a judge and administrator of a local district; this role was partly a forerunner of the current rural mayor in the province of Friesland, and partly the forerunner of a judge. East of the Lauwers river these judges were often referred to as 'redjeva' and west of the Lauwers river as 'grietman'.

== Jurisdiction ==
The area of jurisdiction was the rural grietenij, a judicial district that comprised several church villages (similar to a modern-day municipagreitlity or gemeente). In total, the region of Friesland had 30 such rural districts, outside the cities.

Each of the 30 grietmannen and 11 city mayors formed the Friese Landdag, which was founded in 1504 by the Duke of Saxony, and was a central government for Friesland. The Friese Landdag met in Leeuwarden. Each mayor and grietman had a vote ensuring that the rural population was fairly represented in Friesland. This method of proportional representation, which accounted for both the rural and city populations, was a distinctive and democratic system in Friesland, when compared to the political and legal systems found in Europe during that time period.

The grietman was responsible for administration, justice and maintaining peace and order in the Frisian grietenij. He worked together with a team of village judges and assessors (rechter, mederechter, assessor) who were elected from their midst by the grietman. The grietmannen were also the traditional leaders of the grietenij militias, from the mid-1200s, well before the Saxon occupation in 1498 The grietman was responsible for mustering local militia, gathering both armour and weapons (e.g. speets, degen, harnas, bekkeneel), supplies and able-bodied men aged between 16 and 60.

When dealing with civil disputes or criminal cases (e.g. theft, property, adultery), the grietman would conduct interviews with the perpetrator, victim, and witnesses. After forming judgments, fines and costs related to the proceedings would be imposed. It was necessary for the grietman to keep a clear record of the fines and compositions collected, including who paid them and for what crime. The calculations were made in Holland pounds and stuivers, with 20 stuivers making up one pound. The grietmannen had to account for their income from their administration of justice within their grietenij to the rentmeester-generaal van Friesland (Steward General of Friesland), because the grietman kept half of the fines (boete) and then sent the other half on to the rentmeester-generaal.

The grietman needed to have sufficient influence and military power to conduct interviews, order detentions, and enforce penalties and fines when necessary. This required both political and actual military clout among the local population. For example, the "military potential" of local inhabitants residing in a grietenij were recorded in "Monsterlijsten" (muster lists).

In 1498, Albrecht III, Duke of Saxony made Leeuwarden the seat of the Court of Friesland (Hof van Friesland), a higher court that dealt with government of lands, capital crimes and a court of appeal, which resulted in a shift of power away from the local level. Grietmannen no longer had the power to try capital crimes, such as those involving manslaughter or homicide, at the local level. In these cases, they were only responsible for detaining and questioning suspects of capital crimes and providing relevant information to Leeuwarden for the trial to be held at the Hof van Friesland.

The Municipalities of Thorbecke law (promulgated in 1851) designated the Frisian grietmannen as mayors.

== Election ==
Hoofdelingen preferred the position of grietman. Once elected, in principle, a grietman was typically appointed for life. Officially, the position was democratically elected, but it did require certain amount of wealth due to the election and bribing process. The grietman was responsible for the costs of his campaign prior to his election. The province of Friesland also required a tax upon the appointment of a grietman called "the equivalent."

The law required the voting residents of the villages to come up with nominations; the candidates with the most votes then made it onto a trio from which the College of Deputies, together with the governor, was allowed to choose. Most elections involved much wheeling, dealing and bribing as voters were profit from their power. In 1748, it was decided that something had to be done about the corruption. But after a year of reform, little had changed. Still, henceforth the Stadholder had to approve any new grietman.

== Frisian nobility in the role ==
The role of grietman was officially an elected, democratic position. However it was a favoured position of Frisian nobility (Friese adel, hoofdelingen), because of the power, influence and opportunity to make money that this position offered. Over time, power became increasingly concentrated in the hands of a small number of rich, noble families (Friese adel, or hoofdelingen) over time, such as in the Aylva, Burmania, and Eysinga families, and this trend remained stable for over 100 years, from 1623 to 1795.

For example, for a total of 28 grietmannnen across Friesland in the year 1525, 13 grietmannen belonged to the Frisian nobility, 10 were from common Frisian origins and five were of foreign origin. In the year 1675, out of 28 grietmannen, 17 grietmannen belonged to the Frisian nobility, eight were from common Frisian origins and five were foreigners (two of whom were also nobility).

There were also significant percentages where the successive grietman appointments were related to the immediate predecessor (e.g., in a father–son relationship, or father–son-in law) which points to a significant amount of nepotism and something similar to a family dynasty in the grietenijen. These percentages range from 30% to 50%, and are consistent over the years 1600-1795.

In 1795, the returning Stadholder purges the country of his opponents. In 1813, the dominance of the old Frisian was restored and they would hold on to the grietenijen until the Revolution of 1848. The Thorbecke’s Municipal Law, which entered into force in 1851, turned the sitting grietmannen into mayors. Though the two are often compared, this overlap of personnel is about the only thing the offices shared in common.
