= Municipalities of the Netherlands =

Second-level administrative divisions of the Netherlands

Municipalities of the Netherlands Nederlandse gemeenten (Dutch)
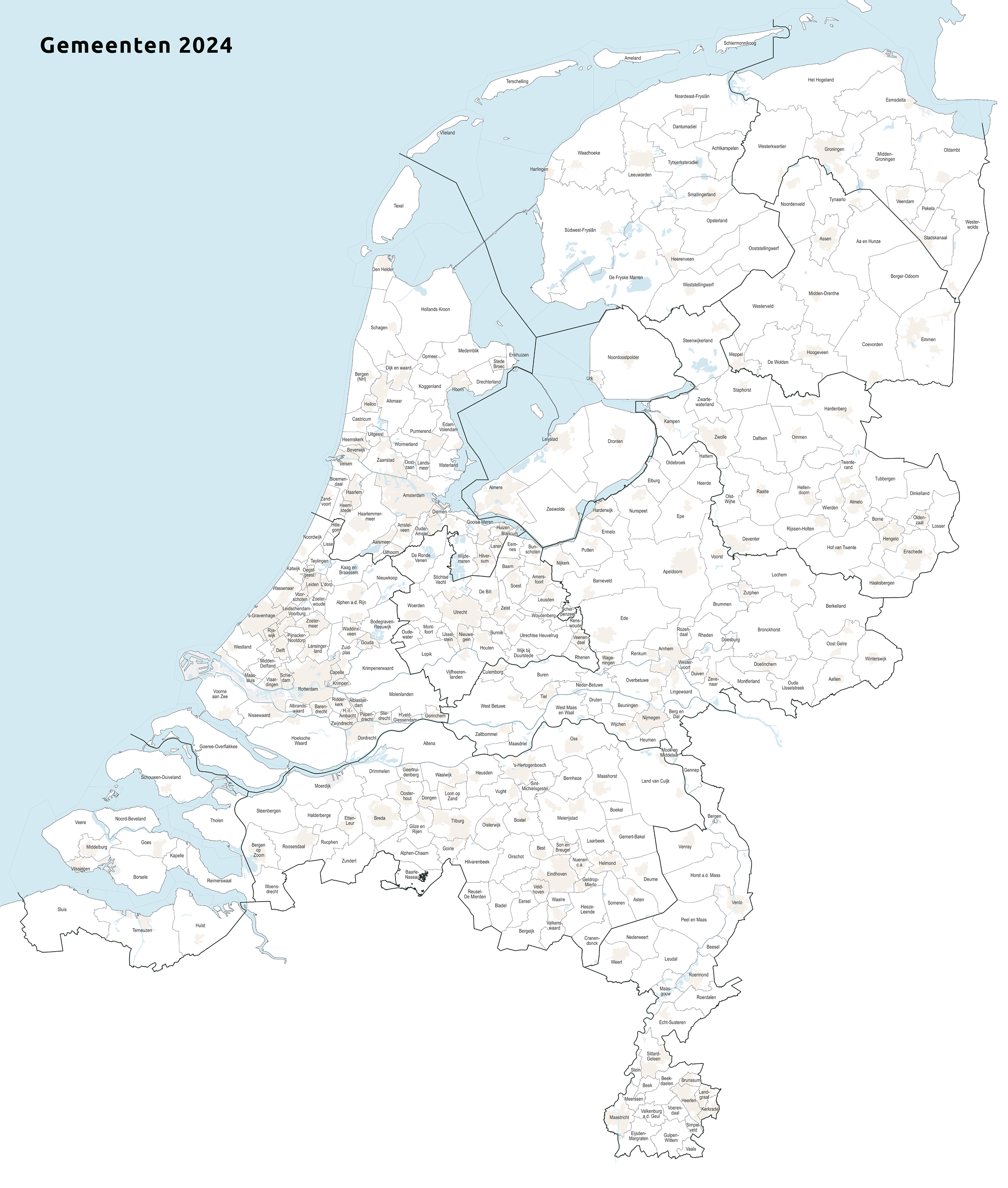
- Map of regular municipalities of the Netherlands, as of 1 January 2024
- Category: Municipality
- Location: Kingdom of the Netherlands
- Found in: Provinces
- Number: 342 + 3 (as of 1 January 2024)
- Possible types: Regular municipalities (342) Special municipalities (3)
- Government: Municipal council

Since 1 January 2023, there are 342 regular municipalities (Dutch: gemeenten [ɣəˈmeːntə(n)]; sing. gemeente [xəˈmeːntə]) and three special municipalities (Dutch: bijzondere gemeenten [biˈzɔndərə -]) in the Netherlands. The latter is the status of three of the six island territories that make up the Dutch Caribbean. Municipalities are the second-level administrative division, or public bodies (Dutch: openbare lichamen), in the Netherlands and are subdivisions of their respective provinces. Their duties are delegated to them by the central government and they are ruled by a municipal council that is elected every four years. Municipal mergers have reduced the total number of municipalities by two-thirds since the first official boundaries were created in the mid 19th century. Municipalities themselves are informally subdivided into districts and neighbourhoods for administrative and statistical purposes.

These municipalities come in a wide range of sizes, Westervoort is the smallest with a land area of 7.01 km^{2} (2.71 sq mi) and Súdwest-Fryslân the largest with a land area of 522.7 km^{2} (201.8 sq mi). Schiermonnikoog is both the least populated, with 972 people, and the least densely populated municipality at 23/km^{2} (60/sq mi). Amsterdam has the highest population with 931,298 residents as of January 2024, whereas The Hague is the most densely populated with a density of 6,868/km^{2} (17,790/sq mi).

== Municipal status ==
As a second level administrative division, municipalities are the third tier of public administration in the Netherlands after the central government and the provinces. The Netherlands is a decentralized unitary state, which means that the central government is supreme and delegates certain tasks to lower levels of government by law. The different levels do, however, make work agreements, which give municipalities a certain degree of independence in their policy decisions. Municipalities are responsible for a wide variety of public services, which include land-use planning, public housing, management and maintenance of local roads, waste management and social security. After the Dissolution of the Netherlands Antilles in 2010, three special municipalities (officially public bodies) were formed. These municipalities function the same as regular municipalities and are grouped together as the Caribbean Netherlands and are not part of a province.

The municipalities are governed by both a board of mayor and aldermen and a municipal council. The municipal council, which is titled island council in the special municipalities, is elected every four years. The number of members in the council ranges from nine members for the smallest municipalities to forty-five members for the largest. It is the highest administrative body in the municipality and controls public policy. The executive power lies with the executive board, which consists of a mayor, titled lieutenant governor in the special municipalities, and multiple aldermen, titled island deputies in the special municipalities. The mayor is appointed for six years at a time by the crown and the alderman are elected by the municipal council, typically after each municipal election. The mayor is responsible for public order and is the first in command during emergencies, all other tasks are distributed freely between mayor and aldermen. The exact portfolio for each person differs between each municipality.

Historical number of municipalities
Year	No.	±%
1850	1,209	—
1900	1,121	−7.3%
1950	1,015	−9.5%
2000	537	−47.1%
2023	342	−36.3%
Source: Ekamper et al. (2003), Government of the Netherlands

Official municipal boundaries were first drawn up in 1832 in the Netherlands after a cadastre was formed. The Municipalities Act of 1851, written by prime minister Thorbecke, led to the disappearance of small municipalities. Throughout the years, less populous municipalities have been merged. They were either added to the larger neighbouring cities or multiple smaller municipalities merged into a larger new municipality with a new name. The number of municipalities reduced from 1,209 in 1850 to 537 in 2000; since 2024, there have been 342 municipalities. During this time, multiple mergers occurred simultaneously in large parts of individual provinces; the municipal boundaries were basically redrawn in these regions. In the 19th and large parts of the 20th century, municipal mergers were forced by the central government. This policy changed in the end of the 20th century; local support for the merger is now a large part of the decision-making process. The larger, merged municipalities are intended to handle an increasing workload because more public services are delegated from higher levels of government to the municipalities. Another reason for municipal mergers is the assumption that larger municipalities are more efficient in performing their tasks than smaller ones.

Municipalities have the right to decentralise themselves and form submunicipalities as an additional level of government. This right and the submunicipalities will cease to exist in the near future to reduce the number of levels of government. Only Amsterdam, where the districts are called stadsdelen in Dutch, as well as Rotterdam, where the districts are called deelgemeenten in Dutch, consist of such formal subdivisions. The Hague, Almere, Breda, Eindhoven, Enschede, Groningen, Nijmegen, Tilburg and Utrecht have instituted stadsdelen as well, although they do not have the same legal submunicipal status. For administrative use by municipalities and data collection by Statistics Netherlands all municipalities are subdivided into districts (Dutch: wijken), which in turn are subdivided into neighbourhoods (Dutch: buurten). These subdivisions have, in contrast to the submunicipalities, no formal status.

== Municipalities ==
=== Regular municipalities ===
Regular municipalities
Municipality	CBS code	Province	Population (Note: Population as of 1 January 2024)	Population density (Note: Population density as of 1 January 2024)	Land area (Note: Land area as of 1 January 2024)	Map
Aa en Hunze	1680	Drenthe	25,845	94/km^{2} (240/mi^{2})	276.06 km^{2} (106.59 mi^{2})	Location of Aa en Hunze
Aalsmeer	0358	North Holland	33,279	1,656/km^{2} (4,290/mi^{2})	20.1 km^{2} (7.76 mi^{2})	Location of Aalsmeer
Aalten	0197	Gelderland	27,308	283/km^{2} (730/mi^{2})	96.53 km^{2} (37.27 mi^{2})	Location of Aalten
Achtkarspelen	0059	Friesland	28,226	276/km^{2} (710/mi^{2})	102.21 km^{2} (39.46 mi^{2})	Location of Achtkarspelen
Alblasserdam	0482	South Holland	20,314	2,316/km^{2} (6,000/mi^{2})	8.77 km^{2} (3.39 mi^{2})	Location of Alblasserdam
Albrandswaard	0613	South Holland	26,428	1,220/km^{2} (3,200/mi^{2})	21.67 km^{2} (8.37 mi^{2})	Location of Albrandswaard
Alkmaar	0361	North Holland	112,304	1,018/km^{2} (2,640/mi^{2})	110.31 km^{2} (42.59 mi^{2})	Location of Alkmaar
Almelo	0141	Overijssel	74,317	1,106/km^{2} (2,860/mi^{2})	67.18 km^{2} (25.94 mi^{2})	Location of Almelo
Almere	0034	Flevoland	226,500	1,753/km^{2} (4,540/mi^{2})	129.18 km^{2} (49.88 mi^{2})	Location of Almere
Alphen aan den Rijn	0484	South Holland	114,966	913/km^{2} (2,360/mi^{2})	125.93 km^{2} (48.62 mi^{2})	Location of Alphen aan den Rijn
Alphen-Chaam	1723	North Brabant	10,455	112/km^{2} (290/mi^{2})	92.98 km^{2} (35.90 mi^{2})	Location of Alphen-Chaam
Altena	1959	North Brabant	58,277	292/km^{2} (760/mi^{2})	199.74 km^{2} (77.12 mi^{2})	Location of Altena
Ameland	0060	Friesland	3,839	68/km^{2} (180/mi^{2})	56.59 km^{2} (21.85 mi^{2})	Location of Ameland
Amersfoort	0307	Utrecht	161,852	2,590/km^{2} (6,700/mi^{2})	62.49 km^{2} (24.13 mi^{2})	Location of Amersfoort
Amstelveen	0362	North Holland	95,014	2,311/km^{2} (5,990/mi^{2})	41.11 km^{2} (15.87 mi^{2})	Location of Amstelveen
Amsterdam	0363	North Holland	931,298	4,950/km^{2} (12,800/mi^{2})	188.12 km^{2} (72.63 mi^{2})	Location of Amsterdam
Apeldoorn	0200	Gelderland	168,211	495/km^{2} (1,280/mi^{2})	339.86 km^{2} (131.22 mi^{2})	Location of Apeldoorn
Arnhem	0202	Gelderland	167,632	1,715/km^{2} (4,440/mi^{2})	97.74 km^{2} (37.74 mi^{2})	Location of Arnhem
Assen	0106	Drenthe	69,701	851/km^{2} (2,200/mi^{2})	81.88 km^{2} (31.61 mi^{2})	Location of Assen
Asten	0743	North Brabant	17,302	246/km^{2} (640/mi^{2})	70.21 km^{2} (27.11 mi^{2})	Location of Asten
Baarle-Nassau	0744	North Brabant	7,076	93/km^{2} (240/mi^{2})	76.12 km^{2} (29.39 mi^{2})	Location of Baarle-Nassau
Baarn	0308	Utrecht	25,065	770/km^{2} (2,000/mi^{2})	32.54 km^{2} (12.56 mi^{2})	Location of Baarn
Barendrecht	0489	South Holland	48,690	2,487/km^{2} (6,440/mi^{2})	19.58 km^{2} (7.56 mi^{2})	Location of Barendrecht
Barneveld	0203	Gelderland	62,592	356/km^{2} (920/mi^{2})	175.84 km^{2} (67.89 mi^{2})	Location of Barneveld
Beek	0888	Limburg	16,215	770/km^{2} (2,000/mi^{2})	21.07 km^{2} (8.14 mi^{2})	Location of Beek
Beekdaelen	1954	Limburg	35,896	458/km^{2} (1,190/mi^{2})	78.3 km^{2} (30.23 mi^{2})	Location of Beekdaelen
Beesel	0889	Limburg	13,394	480/km^{2} (1,200/mi^{2})	27.88 km^{2} (10.76 mi^{2})	Location of Beesel
Berg en Dal	1945	Gelderland	35,474	411/km^{2} (1,060/mi^{2})	86.39 km^{2} (33.36 mi^{2})	Location of Berg en Dal
Bergeijk	1724	North Brabant	19,196	190/km^{2} (490/mi^{2})	101.02 km^{2} (39.00 mi^{2})	Location of Bergeijk
Bergen (LI)	0893	Limburg	13,154	127/km^{2} (330/mi^{2})	103.26 km^{2} (39.87 mi^{2})	Location of Bergen, Limburg
Bergen (NH)	0373	North Holland	29,932	302/km^{2} (780/mi^{2})	99 km^{2} (38.22 mi^{2})	Location of Bergen, North Holland
Bergen op Zoom	0748	North Brabant	69,694	872/km^{2} (2,260/mi^{2})	79.97 km^{2} (30.88 mi^{2})	Location of Bergen op Zoom
Berkelland	1859	Gelderland	43,933	170/km^{2} (440/mi^{2})	258.09 km^{2} (99.65 mi^{2})	Location of Berkelland
Bernheze	1721	North Brabant	32,527	363/km^{2} (940/mi^{2})	89.73 km^{2} (34.64 mi^{2})	Location of Bernheze
Best	0753	North Brabant	31,223	921/km^{2} (2,390/mi^{2})	33.89 km^{2} (13.09 mi^{2})	Location of Best
Beuningen	0209	Gelderland	26,725	613/km^{2} (1,590/mi^{2})	43.6 km^{2} (16.83 mi^{2})	Location of Beuningen
Beverwijk	0375	North Holland	42,866	2,336/km^{2} (6,050/mi^{2})	18.35 km^{2} (7.08 mi^{2})	Location of Beverwijk
Bladel	1728	North Brabant	20,985	279/km^{2} (720/mi^{2})	75.33 km^{2} (29.09 mi^{2})	Location of Bladel
Blaricum	0376	North Holland	12,724	1,149/km^{2} (2,980/mi^{2})	11.07 km^{2} (4.27 mi^{2})	Location of Blaricum
Bloemendaal	0377	North Holland	23,786	598/km^{2} (1,550/mi^{2})	39.77 km^{2} (15.36 mi^{2})	Location of Bloemendaal
Bodegraven-Reeuwijk	1901	South Holland	36,569	485/km^{2} (1,260/mi^{2})	75.4 km^{2} (29.11 mi^{2})	Location of Bodegraven-Reeuwijk
Boekel	0755	North Brabant	11,293	327/km^{2} (850/mi^{2})	34.5 km^{2} (13.32 mi^{2})	Location of Boekel
Borger-Odoorn	1681	Drenthe	26,014	95/km^{2} (250/mi^{2})	274.69 km^{2} (106.06 mi^{2})	Location of Borger-Odoorn
Borne	0147	Overijssel	24,639	948/km^{2} (2,460/mi^{2})	25.99 km^{2} (10.03 mi^{2})	Location of Borne
Borsele	0654	Zeeland	23,121	163/km^{2} (420/mi^{2})	141.47 km^{2} (54.62 mi^{2})	Location of Borsele
Boxtel	0757	North Brabant	33,979	492/km^{2} (1,270/mi^{2})	69.01 km^{2} (26.64 mi^{2})	Location of Boxtel
Breda	0758	North Brabant	188,078	1,496/km^{2} (3,870/mi^{2})	125.69 km^{2} (48.53 mi^{2})	Location of Breda
Bronckhorst	1876	Gelderland	36,119	127/km^{2} (330/mi^{2})	283.53 km^{2} (109.47 mi^{2})	Location of Bronckhorst
Brummen	0213	Gelderland	21,286	255/km^{2} (660/mi^{2})	83.63 km^{2} (32.29 mi^{2})	Location of Brummen
Brunssum	0899	Limburg	27,770	1,611/km^{2} (4,170/mi^{2})	17.24 km^{2} (6.66 mi^{2})	Location of Brunssum
Bunnik	0312	Utrecht	16,108	436/km^{2} (1,130/mi^{2})	36.93 km^{2} (14.26 mi^{2})	Location of Bunnik
Bunschoten	0313	Utrecht	22,619	744/km^{2} (1,930/mi^{2})	30.39 km^{2} (11.73 mi^{2})	Location of Bunschoten
Buren	0214	Gelderland	27,773	208/km^{2} (540/mi^{2})	133.6 km^{2} (51.58 mi^{2})	Location of Buren
Capelle aan den IJssel	0502	South Holland	67,925	4,803/km^{2} (12,440/mi^{2})	14.14 km^{2} (5.46 mi^{2})	Location of Capelle aan den IJssel
Castricum	0383	North Holland	36,366	733/km^{2} (1,900/mi^{2})	49.64 km^{2} (19.17 mi^{2})	Location of Castricum
Coevorden	0109	Drenthe	35,725	121/km^{2} (310/mi^{2})	296.11 km^{2} (114.33 mi^{2})	Location of Coevorden
Cranendonck	1706	North Brabant	20,841	272/km^{2} (700/mi^{2})	76.5 km^{2} (29.54 mi^{2})	Location of Cranendonck
Culemborg	0216	Gelderland	29,944	1,023/km^{2} (2,650/mi^{2})	29.27 km^{2} (11.30 mi^{2})	Location of Culemborg
Dalfsen	0148	Overijssel	29,683	180/km^{2} (470/mi^{2})	165.02 km^{2} (63.71 mi^{2})	Location of Dalfsen
Dantumadiel	1891	Friesland	19,135	226/km^{2} (590/mi^{2})	84.6 km^{2} (32.66 mi^{2})	Location of Dantumadiel
De Bilt	0310	Utrecht	43,718	661/km^{2} (1,710/mi^{2})	66.19 km^{2} (25.56 mi^{2})	Location of De Bilt
De Fryske Marren	1940	Friesland	51,929	148/km^{2} (380/mi^{2})	351.21 km^{2} (135.60 mi^{2})	Location of De Fryske Marren
De Ronde Venen	0736	Utrecht	45,813	460/km^{2} (1,200/mi^{2})	99.68 km^{2} (38.49 mi^{2})	Location of De Ronde Venen
De Wolden	1690	Drenthe	24,580	110/km^{2} (280/mi^{2})	224.39 km^{2} (86.64 mi^{2})	Location of De Wolden
Delft	0503	South Holland	109,577	4,835/km^{2} (12,520/mi^{2})	22.66 km^{2} (8.75 mi^{2})	Location of Delft
Den Helder	0400	North Holland	56,432	1,251/km^{2} (3,240/mi^{2})	45.1 km^{2} (17.41 mi^{2})	Location of Den Helder
Deurne	0762	North Brabant	33,180	284/km^{2} (740/mi^{2})	116.76 km^{2} (45.08 mi^{2})	Location of Deurne
Deventer	0150	Overijssel	103,405	792/km^{2} (2,050/mi^{2})	130.56 km^{2} (50.41 mi^{2})	Location of Deventer
Diemen	0384	North Holland	32,977	2,760/km^{2} (7,100/mi^{2})	11.95 km^{2} (4.61 mi^{2})	Location of Diemen
Dijk en Waard	1980	North Holland	90,076	1,455/km^{2} (3,770/mi^{2})	61.9 km^{2} (23.90 mi^{2})	Location of Dijk en Waard
Dinkelland	1774	Overijssel	26,739	152/km^{2} (390/mi^{2})	175.72 km^{2} (67.85 mi^{2})	Location of Dinkelland
Doesburg	0221	Gelderland	11,079	959/km^{2} (2,480/mi^{2})	11.56 km^{2} (4.46 mi^{2})	Location of Doesburg
Doetinchem	0222	Gelderland	59,623	754/km^{2} (1,950/mi^{2})	79.04 km^{2} (30.52 mi^{2})	Location of Doetinchem
Dongen	0766	North Brabant	27,095	927/km^{2} (2,400/mi^{2})	29.23 km^{2} (11.29 mi^{2})	Location of Dongen
Dordrecht	0505	South Holland	122,070	1,574/km^{2} (4,080/mi^{2})	77.56 km^{2} (29.95 mi^{2})	Location of Dordrecht
Drechterland	0498	North Holland	20,496	348/km^{2} (900/mi^{2})	58.88 km^{2} (22.73 mi^{2})	Location of Drechterland
Drimmelen	1719	North Brabant	28,192	297/km^{2} (770/mi^{2})	95.05 km^{2} (36.70 mi^{2})	Location of Drimmelen
Dronten	0303	Flevoland	44,354	133/km^{2} (340/mi^{2})	333.6 km^{2} (128.80 mi^{2})	Location of Dronten
Druten	0225	Gelderland	19,590	522/km^{2} (1,350/mi^{2})	37.52 km^{2} (14.49 mi^{2})	Location of Druten
Duiven	0226	Gelderland	24,872	734/km^{2} (1,900/mi^{2})	33.88 km^{2} (13.08 mi^{2})	Location of Duiven
Echt-Susteren	1711	Limburg	32,041	311/km^{2} (810/mi^{2})	103.02 km^{2} (39.78 mi^{2})	Location of Echt-Susteren
Edam-Volendam	0385	North Holland	36,917	680/km^{2} (1,800/mi^{2})	54.32 km^{2} (20.97 mi^{2})	Location of Edam-Volendam
Ede	0228	Gelderland	123,532	388/km^{2} (1,000/mi^{2})	318.15 km^{2} (122.84 mi^{2})	Location of Ede
Eemnes	0317	Utrecht	9,755	314/km^{2} (810/mi^{2})	31.04 km^{2} (11.98 mi^{2})	Location of Eemnes
Eemsdelta	1979	Groningen	45,106	168/km^{2} (440/mi^{2})	268.07 km^{2} (103.50 mi^{2})	Location of Eemsdelta
Eersel	0770	North Brabant	20,199	245/km^{2} (630/mi^{2})	82.47 km^{2} (31.84 mi^{2})	Location of Eersel
Eijsden-Margraten	1903	Limburg	26,034	336/km^{2} (870/mi^{2})	77.56 km^{2} (29.95 mi^{2})	Location of Eijsden-Margraten
Eindhoven	0772	North Brabant	246,417	2,800/km^{2} (7,300/mi^{2})	88.02 km^{2} (33.98 mi^{2})	Location of Eindhoven
Elburg	0230	Gelderland	23,906	375/km^{2} (970/mi^{2})	63.82 km^{2} (24.64 mi^{2})	Location of Elburg
Emmen	0114	Drenthe	109,346	326/km^{2} (840/mi^{2})	335.33 km^{2} (129.47 mi^{2})	Location of Emmen
Enkhuizen	0388	North Holland	18,895	1,492/km^{2} (3,860/mi^{2})	12.66 km^{2} (4.89 mi^{2})	Location of Enkhuizen
Enschede	0153	Overijssel	161,738	1,149/km^{2} (2,980/mi^{2})	140.73 km^{2} (54.34 mi^{2})	Location of Enschede
Epe	0232	Gelderland	33,168	212/km^{2} (550/mi^{2})	156.12 km^{2} (60.28 mi^{2})	Location of Epe
Ermelo	0233	Gelderland	27,856	325/km^{2} (840/mi^{2})	85.64 km^{2} (33.07 mi^{2})	Location of Ermelo
Etten-Leur	0777	North Brabant	45,237	818/km^{2} (2,120/mi^{2})	55.29 km^{2} (21.35 mi^{2})	Location of Etten-Leur
Geertruidenberg	0779	North Brabant	22,060	829/km^{2} (2,150/mi^{2})	26.6 km^{2} (10.27 mi^{2})	Location of Geertruidenberg
Geldrop-Mierlo	1771	North Brabant	40,733	1,313/km^{2} (3,400/mi^{2})	31.01 km^{2} (11.97 mi^{2})	Location of Geldrop-Mierlo
Gemert-Bakel	1652	North Brabant	31,435	258/km^{2} (670/mi^{2})	122.07 km^{2} (47.13 mi^{2})	Location of Gemert-Bakel
Gennep	0907	Limburg	17,789	374/km^{2} (970/mi^{2})	47.57 km^{2} (18.37 mi^{2})	Location of Gennep
Gilze en Rijen	0784	North Brabant	27,343	418/km^{2} (1,080/mi^{2})	65.38 km^{2} (25.24 mi^{2})	Location of Gilze en Rijen
Goeree-Overflakkee	1924	South Holland	51,867	198/km^{2} (510/mi^{2})	262.2 km^{2} (101.24 mi^{2})	Location of Goeree-Overflakkee
Goes	0664	Zeeland	39,682	429/km^{2} (1,110/mi^{2})	92.48 km^{2} (35.71 mi^{2})	Location of Goes
Goirle	0785	North Brabant	24,327	566/km^{2} (1,470/mi^{2})	42.97 km^{2} (16.59 mi^{2})	Location of Goirle
Gooise Meren	1942	North Holland	60,370	1,457/km^{2} (3,770/mi^{2})	41.43 km^{2} (16.00 mi^{2})	Location of Gooise Meren
Gorinchem	0512	South Holland	38,671	2,066/km^{2} (5,350/mi^{2})	18.71 km^{2} (7.22 mi^{2})	Location of Gorinchem
Gouda	0513	South Holland	75,758	4,592/km^{2} (11,890/mi^{2})	16.5 km^{2} (6.37 mi^{2})	Location of Gouda
Groningen	0014	Groningen	243,768	1,314/km^{2} (3,400/mi^{2})	185.53 km^{2} (71.63 mi^{2})	Location of Groningen
Gulpen-Wittem	1729	Limburg	14,054	192/km^{2} (500/mi^{2})	73.18 km^{2} (28.25 mi^{2})	Location of Gulpen-Wittem
Haaksbergen	0158	Overijssel	24,359	232/km^{2} (600/mi^{2})	104.78 km^{2} (40.46 mi^{2})	Location of Haaksbergen
Haarlem	0392	North Holland	167,636	5,739/km^{2} (14,860/mi^{2})	29.21 km^{2} (11.28 mi^{2})	Location of Haarlem
Haarlemmermeer	0394	North Holland	163,128	827/km^{2} (2,140/mi^{2})	197.21 km^{2} (76.14 mi^{2})	Location of Haarlemmermeer
Halderberge	1655	North Brabant	31,183	419/km^{2} (1,090/mi^{2})	74.44 km^{2} (28.74 mi^{2})	Location of Halderberge
Hardenberg	0160	Overijssel	62,932	202/km^{2} (520/mi^{2})	312.16 km^{2} (120.53 mi^{2})	Location of Hardenberg
Harderwijk	0243	Gelderland	49,387	1,269/km^{2} (3,290/mi^{2})	38.92 km^{2} (15.03 mi^{2})	Location of Harderwijk
Hardinxveld-Giessendam	0523	South Holland	18,762	1,113/km^{2} (2,880/mi^{2})	16.86 km^{2} (6.51 mi^{2})	Location of Hardinxveld-Giessendam
Harlingen	0072	Friesland	16,229	650/km^{2} (1,700/mi^{2})	24.96 km^{2} (9.64 mi^{2})	Location of Harlingen
Hattem	0244	Gelderland	12,624	547/km^{2} (1,420/mi^{2})	23.07 km^{2} (8.91 mi^{2})	Location of Hattem
Heemskerk	0396	North Holland	39,452	1,447/km^{2} (3,750/mi^{2})	27.27 km^{2} (10.53 mi^{2})	Location of Heemskerk
Heemstede	0397	North Holland	27,593	3,008/km^{2} (7,790/mi^{2})	9.17 km^{2} (3.54 mi^{2})	Location of Heemstede
Heerde	0246	Gelderland	19,226	245/km^{2} (630/mi^{2})	78.55 km^{2} (30.33 mi^{2})	Location of Heerde
Heerenveen	0074	Friesland	51,787	273/km^{2} (710/mi^{2})	189.97 km^{2} (73.35 mi^{2})	Location of Heerenveen
Heerlen	0917	Limburg	87,461	1,948/km^{2} (5,050/mi^{2})	44.91 km^{2} (17.34 mi^{2})	Location of Heerlen
Heeze-Leende	1658	North Brabant	16,807	162/km^{2} (420/mi^{2})	103.92 km^{2} (40.12 mi^{2})	Location of Heeze-Leende
Heiloo	0399	North Holland	24,312	1,300/km^{2} (3,400/mi^{2})	18.71 km^{2} (7.22 mi^{2})	Location of Heiloo
Hellendoorn	0163	Overijssel	36,264	263/km^{2} (680/mi^{2})	137.93 km^{2} (53.26 mi^{2})	Location of Hellendoorn
Helmond	0794	North Brabant	95,874	1,803/km^{2} (4,670/mi^{2})	53.17 km^{2} (20.53 mi^{2})	Location of Helmond
Hendrik-Ido-Ambacht	0531	South Holland	32,689	3,209/km^{2} (8,310/mi^{2})	10.19 km^{2} (3.93 mi^{2})	Location of Hendrik-Ido-Ambacht
Hengelo	0164	Overijssel	83,058	1,365/km^{2} (3,540/mi^{2})	60.84 km^{2} (23.49 mi^{2})	Location of Hengelo
's-Hertogenbosch	0796	North Brabant	160,757	1,468/km^{2} (3,800/mi^{2})	109.48 km^{2} (42.27 mi^{2})	Location of 's-Hertogenbosch
Het Hogeland	1966	Groningen	48,224	101/km^{2} (260/mi^{2})	476.74 km^{2} (184.07 mi^{2})	Location of Het Hogeland
Heumen	0252	Gelderland	16,836	424/km^{2} (1,100/mi^{2})	39.73 km^{2} (15.34 mi^{2})	Location of Heumen
Heusden	0797	North Brabant	46,026	584/km^{2} (1,510/mi^{2})	78.86 km^{2} (30.45 mi^{2})	Location of Heusden
Hillegom	0534	South Holland	22,822	1,775/km^{2} (4,600/mi^{2})	12.86 km^{2} (4.97 mi^{2})	Location of Hillegom
Hilvarenbeek	0798	North Brabant	15,961	168/km^{2} (440/mi^{2})	94.87 km^{2} (36.63 mi^{2})	Location of Hilvarenbeek
Hilversum	0402	North Holland	94,435	2,070/km^{2} (5,400/mi^{2})	45.61 km^{2} (17.61 mi^{2})	Location of Hilversum
Hoeksche Waard	1963	South Holland	90,256	336/km^{2} (870/mi^{2})	268.54 km^{2} (103.68 mi^{2})	Location of Hoeksche Waard
Hof van Twente	1735	Overijssel	35,446	167/km^{2} (430/mi^{2})	212.43 km^{2} (82.02 mi^{2})	Location of Hof van Twente
Hollands Kroon	1911	North Holland	49,522	138/km^{2} (360/mi^{2})	357.63 km^{2} (138.08 mi^{2})	Location of Hollands Kroon
Hoogeveen	0118	Drenthe	56,591	444/km^{2} (1,150/mi^{2})	127.54 km^{2} (49.24 mi^{2})	Location of Hoogeveen
Hoorn	0405	North Holland	75,645	3,713/km^{2} (9,620/mi^{2})	20.37 km^{2} (7.86 mi^{2})	Location of Hoorn
Horst aan de Maas	1507	Limburg	43,917	233/km^{2} (600/mi^{2})	188.67 km^{2} (72.85 mi^{2})	Location of Horst aan de Maas
Houten	0321	Utrecht	50,847	926/km^{2} (2,400/mi^{2})	54.9 km^{2} (21.20 mi^{2})	Location of Houten
Huizen	0406	North Holland	41,193	2,605/km^{2} (6,750/mi^{2})	15.81 km^{2} (6.10 mi^{2})	Location of Huizen
Hulst	0677	Zeeland	27,330	136/km^{2} (350/mi^{2})	201.26 km^{2} (77.71 mi^{2})	Location of Hulst
IJsselstein	0353	Utrecht	33,421	1,591/km^{2} (4,120/mi^{2})	21.01 km^{2} (8.11 mi^{2})	Location of IJsselstein
Kaag en Braassem	1884	South Holland	29,168	462/km^{2} (1,200/mi^{2})	63.13 km^{2} (24.37 mi^{2})	Location of Kaag en Braassem
Kampen	0166	Overijssel	56,177	398/km^{2} (1,030/mi^{2})	141.23 km^{2} (54.53 mi^{2})	Location of Kampen
Kapelle	0678	Zeeland	13,009	350/km^{2} (910/mi^{2})	37.13 km^{2} (14.34 mi^{2})	Location of Kapelle
Katwijk	0537	South Holland	66,966	2,700/km^{2} (7,000/mi^{2})	24.81 km^{2} (9.58 mi^{2})	Location of Katwijk
Kerkrade	0928	Limburg	45,311	2,068/km^{2} (5,360/mi^{2})	21.91 km^{2} (8.46 mi^{2})	Location of Kerkrade
Koggenland	1598	North Holland	23,587	294/km^{2} (760/mi^{2})	80.26 km^{2} (30.99 mi^{2})	Location of Koggenland
Krimpen aan den IJssel	0542	South Holland	29,626	3,861/km^{2} (10,000/mi^{2})	7.67 km^{2} (2.96 mi^{2})	Location of Krimpen aan den IJssel
Krimpenerwaard	1931	South Holland	57,785	390/km^{2} (1,000/mi^{2})	148.32 km^{2} (57.27 mi^{2})	Location of Krimpenerwaard
Laarbeek	1659	North Brabant	23,220	420/km^{2} (1,100/mi^{2})	55.35 km^{2} (21.37 mi^{2})	Location of Laarbeek
Land van Cuijk	1982	North Brabant	91,722	269/km^{2} (700/mi^{2})	341.26 km^{2} (131.76 mi^{2})	Location of Land van Cuijk
Landgraaf	0882	Limburg	37,112	1,510/km^{2} (3,900/mi^{2})	24.58 km^{2} (9.49 mi^{2})	Location of Landgraaf
Landsmeer	0415	North Holland	11,661	520/km^{2} (1,300/mi^{2})	22.44 km^{2} (8.66 mi^{2})	Location of Landsmeer
Lansingerland	1621	South Holland	65,594	1,231/km^{2} (3,190/mi^{2})	53.27 km^{2} (20.57 mi^{2})	Location of Lansingerland
Laren	0417	North Holland	11,439	922/km^{2} (2,390/mi^{2})	12.41 km^{2} (4.79 mi^{2})	Location of Laren
Leeuwarden	0080	Friesland	128,810	542/km^{2} (1,400/mi^{2})	237.55 km^{2} (91.72 mi^{2})	Location of Leeuwarden
Leiden	0546	South Holland	130,108	5,954/km^{2} (15,420/mi^{2})	21.85 km^{2} (8.44 mi^{2})	Location of Leiden
Leiderdorp	0547	South Holland	27,736	2,413/km^{2} (6,250/mi^{2})	11.5 km^{2} (4.44 mi^{2})	Location of Leiderdorp
Leidschendam-Voorburg	1916	South Holland	78,229	2,399/km^{2} (6,210/mi^{2})	32.61 km^{2} (12.59 mi^{2})	Location of Leidschendam-Voorburg
Lelystad	0995	Flevoland	84,080	367/km^{2} (950/mi^{2})	229 km^{2} (88.42 mi^{2})	Location of Lelystad
Leudal	1640	Limburg	36,006	222/km^{2} (570/mi^{2})	162.51 km^{2} (62.75 mi^{2})	Location of Leudal
Leusden	0327	Utrecht	31,681	541/km^{2} (1,400/mi^{2})	58.51 km^{2} (22.59 mi^{2})	Location of Leusden
Lingewaard	1705	Gelderland	47,314	764/km^{2} (1,980/mi^{2})	61.96 km^{2} (23.92 mi^{2})	Location of Lingewaard
Lisse	0553	South Holland	23,447	1,494/km^{2} (3,870/mi^{2})	15.7 km^{2} (6.06 mi^{2})	Location of Lisse
Lochem	0262	Gelderland	34,289	161/km^{2} (420/mi^{2})	213.05 km^{2} (82.26 mi^{2})	Location of Lochem
Loon op Zand	0809	North Brabant	23,850	478/km^{2} (1,240/mi^{2})	49.92 km^{2} (19.27 mi^{2})	Location of Loon op Zand
Lopik	0331	Utrecht	14,724	195/km^{2} (510/mi^{2})	75.56 km^{2} (29.17 mi^{2})	Location of Lopik
Losser	0168	Overijssel	23,376	237/km^{2} (610/mi^{2})	98.74 km^{2} (38.12 mi^{2})	Location of Losser
Maasdriel	0263	Gelderland	26,197	398/km^{2} (1,030/mi^{2})	65.88 km^{2} (25.44 mi^{2})	Location of Maasdriel
Maasgouw	1641	Limburg	24,406	534/km^{2} (1,380/mi^{2})	45.7 km^{2} (17.64 mi^{2})	Location of Maasgouw
Maashorst	1991	North Brabant	59,222	431/km^{2} (1,120/mi^{2})	137.33 km^{2} (53.02 mi^{2})	Location of Maashorst
Maassluis	0556	South Holland	35,832	4,243/km^{2} (10,990/mi^{2})	8.44 km^{2} (3.26 mi^{2})	Location of Maassluis
Maastricht	0935	Limburg	125,285	2,246/km^{2} (5,820/mi^{2})	55.79 km^{2} (21.54 mi^{2})	Location of Maastricht
Medemblik	0420	North Holland	46,002	379/km^{2} (980/mi^{2})	121.23 km^{2} (46.81 mi^{2})	Location of Medemblik
Meerssen	0938	Limburg	18,576	695/km^{2} (1,800/mi^{2})	26.73 km^{2} (10.32 mi^{2})	Location of Meerssen
Meierijstad	1948	North Brabant	84,304	458/km^{2} (1,190/mi^{2})	184 km^{2} (71.04 mi^{2})	Location of Meierijstad
Meppel	0119	Drenthe	35,810	645/km^{2} (1,670/mi^{2})	55.5 km^{2} (21.43 mi^{2})	Location of Meppel
Middelburg	0687	Zeeland	50,004	1,034/km^{2} (2,680/mi^{2})	48.38 km^{2} (18.68 mi^{2})	Location of Middelburg
Midden-Delfland	1842	South Holland	19,377	411/km^{2} (1,060/mi^{2})	47.19 km^{2} (18.22 mi^{2})	Location of Midden-Delfland
Midden-Drenthe	1731	Drenthe	34,092	100/km^{2} (260/mi^{2})	340.62 km^{2} (131.51 mi^{2})	Location of Midden-Drenthe
Midden-Groningen	1952	Groningen	61,433	221/km^{2} (570/mi^{2})	277.95 km^{2} (107.32 mi^{2})	Location of Midden-Groningen
Moerdijk	1709	North Brabant	38,091	239/km^{2} (620/mi^{2})	159.17 km^{2} (61.46 mi^{2})	Location of Moerdijk
Molenlanden	1978	South Holland	45,271	249/km^{2} (640/mi^{2})	181.57 km^{2} (70.10 mi^{2})	Location of Molenlanden
Montferland	1955	Gelderland	36,873	349/km^{2} (900/mi^{2})	105.7 km^{2} (40.81 mi^{2})	Location of Montferland
Montfoort	0335	Utrecht	13,868	369/km^{2} (960/mi^{2})	37.58 km^{2} (14.51 mi^{2})	Location of Montfoort
Mook en Middelaar	0944	Limburg	8,153	469/km^{2} (1,210/mi^{2})	17.39 km^{2} (6.71 mi^{2})	Location of Mook en Middelaar
Neder-Betuwe	1740	Gelderland	25,708	429/km^{2} (1,110/mi^{2})	59.99 km^{2} (23.16 mi^{2})	Location of Neder-Betuwe
Nederweert	0946	Limburg	17,492	175/km^{2} (450/mi^{2})	99.9 km^{2} (38.57 mi^{2})	Location of Nederweert
Nieuwegein	0356	Utrecht	65,971	2,817/km^{2} (7,300/mi^{2})	23.42 km^{2} (9.04 mi^{2})	Location of Nieuwegein
Nieuwkoop	0569	South Holland	29,501	376/km^{2} (970/mi^{2})	78.46 km^{2} (30.29 mi^{2})	Location of Nieuwkoop
Nijkerk	0267	Gelderland	45,361	654/km^{2} (1,690/mi^{2})	69.32 km^{2} (26.76 mi^{2})	Location of Nijkerk
Nijmegen	0268	Gelderland	187,049	3,542/km^{2} (9,170/mi^{2})	52.81 km^{2} (20.39 mi^{2})	Location of Nijmegen
Nissewaard	1930	South Holland	87,639	1,195/km^{2} (3,100/mi^{2})	73.31 km^{2} (28.31 mi^{2})	Location of Nissewaard
Noardeast-Fryslân	1970	Friesland	45,866	121/km^{2} (310/mi^{2})	379.22 km^{2} (146.42 mi^{2})	Location of Noardeast-Fryslân
Noord-Beveland	1695	Zeeland	7,943	92/km^{2} (240/mi^{2})	86 km^{2} (33.20 mi^{2})	Location of Noord-Beveland
Noordenveld	1699	Drenthe	31,686	159/km^{2} (410/mi^{2})	199.01 km^{2} (76.84 mi^{2})	Location of Noordenveld
Noordoostpolder	0171	Flevoland	50,035	109/km^{2} (280/mi^{2})	458.09 km^{2} (176.87 mi^{2})	Location of Noordoostpolder
Noordwijk	0575	South Holland	45,734	784/km^{2} (2,030/mi^{2})	58.34 km^{2} (22.53 mi^{2})	Location of Noordwijk
Nuenen, Gerwen en Nederwetten	0820	North Brabant	24,231	720/km^{2} (1,900/mi^{2})	33.65 km^{2} (12.99 mi^{2})	Location of Nuenen, Gerwen en Nederwetten
Nunspeet	0302	Gelderland	29,072	226/km^{2} (590/mi^{2})	128.73 km^{2} (49.70 mi^{2})	Location of Nunspeet
Oegstgeest	0579	South Holland	25,948	3,557/km^{2} (9,210/mi^{2})	7.29 km^{2} (2.81 mi^{2})	Location of Oegstgeest
Oirschot	0823	North Brabant	19,280	189/km^{2} (490/mi^{2})	101.79 km^{2} (39.30 mi^{2})	Location of Oirschot
Oisterwijk	0824	North Brabant	32,952	411/km^{2} (1,060/mi^{2})	80.11 km^{2} (30.93 mi^{2})	Location of Oisterwijk
Oldambt	1895	Groningen	39,405	174/km^{2} (450/mi^{2})	226.57 km^{2} (87.48 mi^{2})	Location of Oldambt
Oldebroek	0269	Gelderland	24,281	249/km^{2} (640/mi^{2})	97.66 km^{2} (37.71 mi^{2})	Location of Oldebroek
Oldenzaal	0173	Overijssel	31,794	1,475/km^{2} (3,820/mi^{2})	21.55 km^{2} (8.32 mi^{2})	Location of Oldenzaal
Olst-Wijhe	1773	Overijssel	18,835	166/km^{2} (430/mi^{2})	113.66 km^{2} (43.88 mi^{2})	Location of Olst-Wijhe
Ommen	0175	Overijssel	19,031	106/km^{2} (270/mi^{2})	179.85 km^{2} (69.44 mi^{2})	Location of Ommen
Oost Gelre	1586	Gelderland	29,969	273/km^{2} (710/mi^{2})	109.93 km^{2} (42.44 mi^{2})	Location of Oost Gelre
Oosterhout	0826	North Brabant	57,924	811/km^{2} (2,100/mi^{2})	71.43 km^{2} (27.58 mi^{2})	Location of Oosterhout
Ooststellingwerf	0085	Friesland	25,824	116/km^{2} (300/mi^{2})	223.3 km^{2} (86.22 mi^{2})	Location of Ooststellingwerf
Oostzaan	0431	North Holland	9,694	839/km^{2} (2,170/mi^{2})	11.56 km^{2} (4.46 mi^{2})	Location of Oostzaan
Opmeer	0432	North Holland	12,199	294/km^{2} (760/mi^{2})	41.48 km^{2} (16.02 mi^{2})	Location of Opmeer
Opsterland	0086	Friesland	30,059	134/km^{2} (350/mi^{2})	224.4 km^{2} (86.64 mi^{2})	Location of Opsterland
Oss	0828	North Brabant	94,634	584/km^{2} (1,510/mi^{2})	162.01 km^{2} (62.55 mi^{2})	Location of Oss
Oude IJsselstreek	1509	Gelderland	39,402	290/km^{2} (750/mi^{2})	136.07 km^{2} (52.54 mi^{2})	Location of Oude IJsselstreek
Ouder-Amstel	0437	North Holland	14,447	603/km^{2} (1,560/mi^{2})	23.95 km^{2} (9.25 mi^{2})	Location of Ouder-Amstel
Oudewater	0589	Utrecht	10,223	263/km^{2} (680/mi^{2})	38.9 km^{2} (15.02 mi^{2})	Location of Oudewater
Overbetuwe	1734	Gelderland	48,919	449/km^{2} (1,160/mi^{2})	109.03 km^{2} (42.10 mi^{2})	Location of Overbetuwe
Papendrecht	0590	South Holland	32,178	3,418/km^{2} (8,850/mi^{2})	9.41 km^{2} (3.63 mi^{2})	Location of Papendrecht
Peel en Maas	1894	Limburg	45,534	286/km^{2} (740/mi^{2})	159.35 km^{2} (61.53 mi^{2})	Location of Peel en Maas
Pekela	0765	Groningen	12,517	255/km^{2} (660/mi^{2})	49.04 km^{2} (18.93 mi^{2})	Location of Pekela
Pijnacker-Nootdorp	1926	South Holland	57,932	1,571/km^{2} (4,070/mi^{2})	36.87 km^{2} (14.24 mi^{2})	Location of Pijnacker-Nootdorp
Purmerend	0439	North Holland	95,168	1,017/km^{2} (2,630/mi^{2})	93.61 km^{2} (36.14 mi^{2})	Location of Purmerend
Putten	0273	Gelderland	24,978	293/km^{2} (760/mi^{2})	85.21 km^{2} (32.90 mi^{2})	Location of Putten
Raalte	0177	Overijssel	38,364	224/km^{2} (580/mi^{2})	170.97 km^{2} (66.01 mi^{2})	Location of Raalte
Reimerswaal	0703	Zeeland	23,325	229/km^{2} (590/mi^{2})	101.76 km^{2} (39.29 mi^{2})	Location of Reimerswaal
Renkum	0274	Gelderland	31,419	684/km^{2} (1,770/mi^{2})	45.96 km^{2} (17.75 mi^{2})	Location of Renkum
Renswoude	0339	Utrecht	5,753	313/km^{2} (810/mi^{2})	18.39 km^{2} (7.10 mi^{2})	Location of Renswoude
Reusel-De Mierden	1667	North Brabant	13,577	174/km^{2} (450/mi^{2})	77.81 km^{2} (30.04 mi^{2})	Location of Reusel-De Mierden
Rheden	0275	Gelderland	43,661	534/km^{2} (1,380/mi^{2})	81.77 km^{2} (31.57 mi^{2})	Location of Rheden
Rhenen	0340	Utrecht	20,235	482/km^{2} (1,250/mi^{2})	42.02 km^{2} (16.22 mi^{2})	Location of Rhenen
Ridderkerk	0597	South Holland	47,721	2,033/km^{2} (5,270/mi^{2})	23.48 km^{2} (9.07 mi^{2})	Location of Ridderkerk
Rijssen-Holten	1742	Overijssel	38,675	411/km^{2} (1,060/mi^{2})	94.12 km^{2} (36.34 mi^{2})	Location of Rijssen-Holten
Rijswijk	0603	South Holland	59,642	4,267/km^{2} (11,050/mi^{2})	13.98 km^{2} (5.40 mi^{2})	Location of Rijswijk
Roerdalen	1669	Limburg	20,806	236/km^{2} (610/mi^{2})	88.21 km^{2} (34.06 mi^{2})	Location of Roerdalen
Roermond	0957	Limburg	60,743	1,002/km^{2} (2,600/mi^{2})	60.64 km^{2} (23.41 mi^{2})	Location of Roermond
Roosendaal	1674	North Brabant	77,559	728/km^{2} (1,890/mi^{2})	106.5 km^{2} (41.12 mi^{2})	Location of Roosendaal
Rotterdam	0599	South Holland	670,610	3,070/km^{2} (8,000/mi^{2})	218.42 km^{2} (84.33 mi^{2})	Location of Rotterdam
Rozendaal	0277	Gelderland	1,831	66/km^{2} (170/mi^{2})	27.9 km^{2} (10.77 mi^{2})	Location of Rozendaal
Rucphen	0840	North Brabant	23,920	372/km^{2} (960/mi^{2})	64.38 km^{2} (24.86 mi^{2})	Location of Rucphen
Schagen	0441	North Holland	47,744	284/km^{2} (740/mi^{2})	167.99 km^{2} (64.86 mi^{2})	Location of Schagen
Scherpenzeel	0279	Gelderland	10,343	750/km^{2} (1,900/mi^{2})	13.79 km^{2} (5.32 mi^{2})	Location of Scherpenzeel
Schiedam	0606	South Holland	81,838	4,596/km^{2} (11,900/mi^{2})	17.81 km^{2} (6.88 mi^{2})	Location of Schiedam
Schiermonnikoog	0088	Friesland	972	23/km^{2} (60/mi^{2})	42.93 km^{2} (16.58 mi^{2})	Location of Schiermonnikoog
Schouwen-Duiveland	1676	Zeeland	34,631	151/km^{2} (390/mi^{2})	228.6 km^{2} (88.26 mi^{2})	Location of Schouwen-Duiveland
Simpelveld	0965	Limburg	10,255	640/km^{2} (1,700/mi^{2})	16.03 km^{2} (6.19 mi^{2})	Location of Simpelveld
Sint-Michielsgestel	0845	North Brabant	30,094	516/km^{2} (1,340/mi^{2})	58.35 km^{2} (22.53 mi^{2})	Location of Sint-Michielsgestel
Sittard-Geleen	1883	Limburg	92,650	1,179/km^{2} (3,050/mi^{2})	78.61 km^{2} (30.35 mi^{2})	Location of Sittard-Geleen
Sliedrecht	0610	South Holland	26,261	2,044/km^{2} (5,290/mi^{2})	12.85 km^{2} (4.96 mi^{2})	Location of Sliedrecht
Sluis	1714	Zeeland	23,150	83/km^{2} (210/mi^{2})	278.6 km^{2} (107.57 mi^{2})	Location of Sluis
Smallingerland	0090	Friesland	56,661	484/km^{2} (1,250/mi^{2})	117.17 km^{2} (45.24 mi^{2})	Location of Smallingerland
Soest	0342	Utrecht	47,682	1,031/km^{2} (2,670/mi^{2})	46.25 km^{2} (17.86 mi^{2})	Location of Soest
Someren	0847	North Brabant	20,188	252/km^{2} (650/mi^{2})	80.1 km^{2} (30.93 mi^{2})	Location of Someren
Son en Breugel	0848	North Brabant	17,959	692/km^{2} (1,790/mi^{2})	25.95 km^{2} (10.02 mi^{2})	Location of Son en Breugel
Stadskanaal	0037	Groningen	32,013	272/km^{2} (700/mi^{2})	117.63 km^{2} (45.42 mi^{2})	Location of Stadskanaal
Staphorst	0180	Overijssel	17,739	132/km^{2} (340/mi^{2})	133.94 km^{2} (51.71 mi^{2})	Location of Staphorst
Stede Broec	0532	North Holland	22,217	1,534/km^{2} (3,970/mi^{2})	14.48 km^{2} (5.59 mi^{2})	Location of Stede Broec
Steenbergen	0851	North Brabant	24,476	167/km^{2} (430/mi^{2})	146.5 km^{2} (56.56 mi^{2})	Location of Steenbergen
Steenwijkerland	1708	Overijssel	45,472	158/km^{2} (410/mi^{2})	288.31 km^{2} (111.32 mi^{2})	Location of Steenwijkerland
Stein	0971	Limburg	24,744	1,183/km^{2} (3,060/mi^{2})	20.92 km^{2} (8.08 mi^{2})	Location of Stein
Stichtse Vecht	1904	Utrecht	65,878	686/km^{2} (1,780/mi^{2})	96.04 km^{2} (37.08 mi^{2})	Location of Stichtse Vecht
Súdwest-Fryslân	1900	Friesland	90,421	173/km^{2} (450/mi^{2})	522.7 km^{2} (201.82 mi^{2})	Location of Súdwest-Fryslân
Terneuzen	0715	Zeeland	55,132	220/km^{2} (570/mi^{2})	250.13 km^{2} (96.58 mi^{2})	Location of Terneuzen
Terschelling	0093	Friesland	4,898	56/km^{2} (150/mi^{2})	87.21 km^{2} (33.67 mi^{2})	Location of Terschelling
Texel	0448	North Holland	13,815	85/km^{2} (220/mi^{2})	162.26 km^{2} (62.65 mi^{2})	Location of Texel
Teylingen	1525	South Holland	38,470	1,358/km^{2} (3,520/mi^{2})	28.32 km^{2} (10.93 mi^{2})	Location of Teylingen
The Hague	0518	South Holland	566,221	6,868/km^{2} (17,790/mi^{2})	82.44 km^{2} (31.83 mi^{2})	Location of The Hague
Tholen	0716	Zeeland	26,851	183/km^{2} (470/mi^{2})	146.72 km^{2} (56.65 mi^{2})	Location of Tholen
Tiel	0281	Gelderland	42,370	1,292/km^{2} (3,350/mi^{2})	32.8 km^{2} (12.66 mi^{2})	Location of Tiel
Tilburg	0855	North Brabant	229,836	1,826/km^{2} (4,730/mi^{2})	125.89 km^{2} (48.61 mi^{2})	Location of Tilburg
Tubbergen	0183	Overijssel	21,397	146/km^{2} (380/mi^{2})	147 km^{2} (56.76 mi^{2})	Location of Tubbergen
Twenterand	1700	Overijssel	34,073	321/km^{2} (830/mi^{2})	106.14 km^{2} (40.98 mi^{2})	Location of Twenterand
Tynaarlo	1730	Drenthe	34,736	243/km^{2} (630/mi^{2})	142.88 km^{2} (55.17 mi^{2})	Location of Tynaarlo
Tytsjerksteradiel	0737	Friesland	32,595	219/km^{2} (570/mi^{2})	148.63 km^{2} (57.39 mi^{2})	Location of Tytsjerksteradiel
Uitgeest	0450	North Holland	13,400	700/km^{2} (1,800/mi^{2})	19.16 km^{2} (7.40 mi^{2})	Location of Uitgeest
Uithoorn	0451	North Holland	31,685	1,749/km^{2} (4,530/mi^{2})	18.12 km^{2} (7.00 mi^{2})	Location of Uithoorn
Urk	0184	Flevoland	21,958	1,671/km^{2} (4,330/mi^{2})	13.14 km^{2} (5.07 mi^{2})	Location of Urk
Utrecht	0344	Utrecht	374,238	3,991/km^{2} (10,340/mi^{2})	93.77 km^{2} (36.20 mi^{2})	Location of Utrecht
Utrechtse Heuvelrug	1581	Utrecht	50,550	383/km^{2} (990/mi^{2})	132.02 km^{2} (50.97 mi^{2})	Location of Utrechtse Heuvelrug
Vaals	0981	Limburg	10,121	424/km^{2} (1,100/mi^{2})	23.89 km^{2} (9.22 mi^{2})	Location of Vaals
Valkenburg aan de Geul	0994	Limburg	16,431	447/km^{2} (1,160/mi^{2})	36.73 km^{2} (14.18 mi^{2})	Location of Valkenburg aan de Geul
Valkenswaard	0858	North Brabant	31,714	578/km^{2} (1,500/mi^{2})	54.91 km^{2} (21.20 mi^{2})	Location of Valkenswaard
Veendam	0047	Groningen	27,520	362/km^{2} (940/mi^{2})	75.93 km^{2} (29.32 mi^{2})	Location of Veendam
Veenendaal	0345	Utrecht	69,440	3,575/km^{2} (9,260/mi^{2})	19.42 km^{2} (7.50 mi^{2})	Location of Veenendaal
Veere	0717	Zeeland	22,067	166/km^{2} (430/mi^{2})	132.99 km^{2} (51.35 mi^{2})	Location of Veere
Veldhoven	0861	North Brabant	46,827	1,478/km^{2} (3,830/mi^{2})	31.68 km^{2} (12.23 mi^{2})	Location of Veldhoven
Velsen	0453	North Holland	69,241	1,538/km^{2} (3,980/mi^{2})	45.03 km^{2} (17.39 mi^{2})	Location of Velsen
Venlo	0983	Limburg	103,789	836/km^{2} (2,170/mi^{2})	124.16 km^{2} (47.94 mi^{2})	Location of Venlo
Venray	0984	Limburg	44,662	274/km^{2} (710/mi^{2})	163.18 km^{2} (63.00 mi^{2})	Location of Venray
Vijfheerenlanden	1961	Utrecht	61,669	422/km^{2} (1,090/mi^{2})	146.28 km^{2} (56.48 mi^{2})	Location of Vijfheerenlanden
Vlaardingen	0622	South Holland	76,409	3,270/km^{2} (8,500/mi^{2})	23.36 km^{2} (9.02 mi^{2})	Location of Vlaardingen
Vlieland	0096	Friesland	1,255	30/km^{2} (78/mi^{2})	41.84 km^{2} (16.15 mi^{2})	Location of Vlieland
Vlissingen	0718	Zeeland	45,389	1,321/km^{2} (3,420/mi^{2})	34.37 km^{2} (13.27 mi^{2})	Location of Vlissingen
Voerendaal	0986	Limburg	12,375	393/km^{2} (1,020/mi^{2})	31.51 km^{2} (12.17 mi^{2})	Location of Voerendaal
Voorne aan Zee	1992	South Holland	74,304	610/km^{2} (1,600/mi^{2})	121.77 km^{2} (47.02 mi^{2})	Location of Voorne aan Zee
Voorschoten	0626	South Holland	25,625	2,306/km^{2} (5,970/mi^{2})	11.11 km^{2} (4.29 mi^{2})	Location of Voorschoten
Voorst	0285	Gelderland	25,377	206/km^{2} (530/mi^{2})	122.93 km^{2} (47.46 mi^{2})	Location of Voorst
Vught	0865	North Brabant	32,356	539/km^{2} (1,400/mi^{2})	60.02 km^{2} (23.17 mi^{2})	Location of Vught
Waadhoeke	1949	Friesland	46,911	164/km^{2} (420/mi^{2})	285.42 km^{2} (110.20 mi^{2})	Location of Waadhoeke
Waalre	0866	North Brabant	17,988	804/km^{2} (2,080/mi^{2})	22.38 km^{2} (8.64 mi^{2})	Location of Waalre
Waalwijk	0867	North Brabant	50,302	779/km^{2} (2,020/mi^{2})	64.54 km^{2} (24.92 mi^{2})	Location of Waalwijk
Waddinxveen	0627	South Holland	34,000	1,225/km^{2} (3,170/mi^{2})	27.75 km^{2} (10.71 mi^{2})	Location of Waddinxveen
Wageningen	0289	Gelderland	42,579	1,400/km^{2} (3,600/mi^{2})	30.42 km^{2} (11.75 mi^{2})	Location of Wageningen
Wassenaar	0629	South Holland	27,100	530/km^{2} (1,400/mi^{2})	51.18 km^{2} (19.76 mi^{2})	Location of Wassenaar
Waterland	0852	North Holland	17,525	337/km^{2} (870/mi^{2})	51.99 km^{2} (20.07 mi^{2})	Location of Waterland
Weert	0988	Limburg	51,079	490/km^{2} (1,300/mi^{2})	104.25 km^{2} (40.25 mi^{2})	Location of Weert
West Betuwe	1960	Gelderland	52,948	245/km^{2} (630/mi^{2})	215.93 km^{2} (83.37 mi^{2})	Location of West Betuwe
West Maas en Waal	0668	Gelderland	20,330	267/km^{2} (690/mi^{2})	76.19 km^{2} (29.42 mi^{2})	Location of West Maas en Waal
Westerkwartier	1969	Groningen	64,896	179/km^{2} (460/mi^{2})	362.63 km^{2} (140.01 mi^{2})	Location of Westerkwartier
Westerveld	1701	Drenthe	20,003	72/km^{2} (190/mi^{2})	278.65 km^{2} (107.59 mi^{2})	Location of Westerveld
Westervoort	0293	Gelderland	15,151	2,160/km^{2} (5,600/mi^{2})	7.01 km^{2} (2.71 mi^{2})	Location of Westervoort
Westerwolde	1950	Groningen	26,465	96/km^{2} (250/mi^{2})	275.77 km^{2} (106.48 mi^{2})	Location of Westerwolde
Westland	1783	South Holland	115,941	1,436/km^{2} (3,720/mi^{2})	80.76 km^{2} (31.18 mi^{2})	Location of Westland
Weststellingwerf	0098	Friesland	26,487	120/km^{2} (310/mi^{2})	220.2 km^{2} (85.02 mi^{2})	Location of Weststellingwerf
Wierden	0189	Overijssel	24,931	264/km^{2} (680/mi^{2})	94.6 km^{2} (36.53 mi^{2})	Location of Wierden
Wijchen	0296	Gelderland	41,545	629/km^{2} (1,630/mi^{2})	66.04 km^{2} (25.50 mi^{2})	Location of Wijchen
Wijdemeren	1696	North Holland	24,605	518/km^{2} (1,340/mi^{2})	47.54 km^{2} (18.36 mi^{2})	Location of Wijdemeren
Wijk bij Duurstede	0352	Utrecht	23,945	503/km^{2} (1,300/mi^{2})	47.58 km^{2} (18.37 mi^{2})	Location of Wijk bij Duurstede
Winterswijk	0294	Gelderland	29,231	212/km^{2} (550/mi^{2})	138.13 km^{2} (53.33 mi^{2})	Location of Winterswijk
Woensdrecht	0873	North Brabant	22,208	242/km^{2} (630/mi^{2})	91.66 km^{2} (35.39 mi^{2})	Location of Woensdrecht
Woerden	0632	Utrecht	53,724	607/km^{2} (1,570/mi^{2})	88.55 km^{2} (34.19 mi^{2})	Location of Woerden
Wormerland	0880	North Holland	16,552	430/km^{2} (1,100/mi^{2})	38.51 km^{2} (14.87 mi^{2})	Location of Wormerland
Woudenberg	0351	Utrecht	14,637	401/km^{2} (1,040/mi^{2})	36.52 km^{2} (14.10 mi^{2})	Location of Woudenberg
Zaanstad	0479	North Holland	161,389	2,189/km^{2} (5,670/mi^{2})	73.74 km^{2} (28.47 mi^{2})	Location of Zaanstad
Zaltbommel	0297	Gelderland	30,385	386/km^{2} (1,000/mi^{2})	78.65 km^{2} (30.37 mi^{2})	Location of Zaltbommel
Zandvoort	0473	North Holland	17,469	545/km^{2} (1,410/mi^{2})	32.08 km^{2} (12.39 mi^{2})	Location of Zandvoort
Zeewolde	0050	Flevoland	23,899	97/km^{2} (250/mi^{2})	247.11 km^{2} (95.41 mi^{2})	Location of Zeewolde
Zeist	0355	Utrecht	66,641	1,374/km^{2} (3,560/mi^{2})	48.5 km^{2} (18.73 mi^{2})	Location of Zeist
Zevenaar	0299	Gelderland	45,041	486/km^{2} (1,260/mi^{2})	92.62 km^{2} (35.76 mi^{2})	Location of Zevenaar
Zoetermeer	0637	South Holland	128,434	3,730/km^{2} (9,700/mi^{2})	34.43 km^{2} (13.29 mi^{2})	Location of Zoetermeer
Zoeterwoude	0638	South Holland	9,732	460/km^{2} (1,200/mi^{2})	21.16 km^{2} (8.17 mi^{2})	Location of Zoeterwoude
Zuidplas	1892	South Holland	47,843	825/km^{2} (2,140/mi^{2})	57.96 km^{2} (22.38 mi^{2})	Location of Zuidplas
Zundert	0879	North Brabant	22,553	187/km^{2} (480/mi^{2})	120.59 km^{2} (46.56 mi^{2})	Location of Zundert
Zutphen	0301	Gelderland	48,752	1,191/km^{2} (3,080/mi^{2})	40.92 km^{2} (15.80 mi^{2})	Location of Zutphen
Zwartewaterland	1896	Overijssel	23,448	285/km^{2} (740/mi^{2})	82.36 km^{2} (31.80 mi^{2})	Location of Zwartewaterland
Zwijndrecht	0642	South Holland	44,874	2,210/km^{2} (5,700/mi^{2})	20.31 km^{2} (7.84 mi^{2})	Location of Zwijndrecht
Zwolle	0193	Overijssel	133,141	1,203/km^{2} (3,120/mi^{2})	110.67 km^{2} (42.73 mi^{2})	Location of Zwolle

=== Special municipalities ===
Special municipalities
Municipality	Capital	Population (Note: Population as of January 2020)	Population density (Note: The population density is calculated by dividing the population by the area for each special municipality.)	Area (Note: Area as of 2012)	Map
Bonaire	Kralendijk	20,915	73/km^{2} (190/mi^{2})	288 km^{2} (111.20 mi^{2})	Location of Bonaire
Sint Eustatius	Oranjestad	3,139	149/km^{2} (390/mi^{2})	21 km^{2} (8.11 mi^{2})	Location of Sint Eustatius
Saba	The Bottom	1,933	149/km^{2} (390/mi^{2})	13 km^{2} (5.02 mi^{2})	Location of Saba

=== Number of municipalities by province ===
Number of municipalities by province
Province	Municipalities
Drenthe	12
Flevoland	6
Friesland	18
Gelderland	51
Groningen	10
Limburg	31
North Brabant	56
North Holland	44
Overijssel	25
South Holland	50
Utrecht	26
Zeeland	13
Total	342

== See also ==
- Association of Netherlands Municipalities
- Municipal politics in the Netherlands
- List of cities, towns and villages in the Netherlands by province
- Municipal flags of the Netherlands
- Coats of arms of municipalities of the Netherlands
- Gemeentewet
