= Gerrit de Vries =

Gerrit de Vries may refer to:

- Gerrit de Vries (politician) (1818–1900), 11th Prime Minister of the Netherlands, 1872–1874
- Gerrit de Vries (cyclist) (born 1967), Dutch cyclist
