= Isaäc Dignus Fransen van de Putte =

Dutch politician (1822–1902)

His Excellency Isaäc Fransen van de Putte
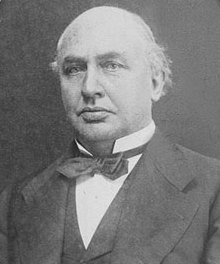

11th Prime Minister of the Netherlands
- In office 10 February – 1 June 1866
- Preceded by: Johan Rudolph Thorbecke
- Succeeded by: Julius van Zuylen van Nijevelt

Personal details
- Born: 22 March 1822 Goes, Netherlands
- Died: 3 March 1902 (aged 79) The Hague, Netherlands
- Spouse: Lucia de Groot
- Children: 4

Isaäc Dignus Fransen van de Putte (22 March 1822 – 3 March 1902) was a Dutch politician who briefly served as Prime Minister of the Netherlands in 1866, and as Minister of Colonial Affairs from 1863 to 1866 and 1872 to 1874.

== Career ==
Fransen van de Putte received training as an officer at the Royal Naval College in Medemblik and then worked for 10 years on the merchant ships of Rotterdam shipowner Anthony van Hoboken, where he rose to the position of mate. In 1849, he became an administrator at the sugar plantation Panji to Besuki on Java.

He eventually returned to the Netherlands and became a member of parliament in 1862. After a year of Chamber membership, in 1863 he became Minister of Colonial Affairs. In his first term, he worked on the abolition of the Cultivation System.

In 1866, Fransen van de Putte had a disagreement with Johan Rudolph Thorbecke about colonial land policies. He joined Thorbecke's cabinet but was dismissed. In 1872, Fransen van de Putte returned to the cabinet of Gerrit de Vries. He served as a cabinet member during the Aceh War from 1873 to 1874. He and expedition commander Jan van Swieten criticized the often bloody and inhumane treatment of civilians, ranging from large-scale execution to deliberate destruction of livestock and rice fields in Sumatra.

He tried in vain to mediate the conflict between the king and his eldest son, William, Prince of Orange. This issue arose again in 1877 when he joined the cabinet of Jan Kappeyne van de Coppello. He asked that the ministry decide against the king before a wedding of the crown prince to Countess Mathilde van Limburg-Stirum. The former, however, did not go far.

== Personal life ==
On 28 March 1850, in Delft, Fransen van de Putte married Lucie Henriette Cornets de Groot. He is buried in the cemetery at Old Oak Dunes in The Hague. The Dutch ship Franssen van de Putten was named after him.

Political offices
Preceded by Pieter van Bosse	Minister of Colonial Affairs; 1872–1874	Succeeded by Willem van Goltstein van Oldenaller
Preceded by Johan Rudolph Thorbecke	Prime Minister of the Netherlands; 1866	Succeeded by Julius van Zuylen van Nijevelt
Preceded by Gerardus Henri Betz (interim)	Minister of Colonial Affairs; 1863–1866	Succeeded by Pieter Mijer
