= Pieter Philip van Bosse =

Dutch politician (1809–1879)

His Excellency Pieter Philip van Bosse
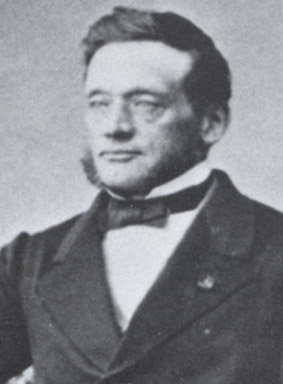

13th Prime Minister of the Netherlands
- In office 4 June 1868 – 4 January 1871
- Monarch: William III
- Preceded by: Julius van Zuylen van Nijevelt
- Succeeded by: Johan Rudolph Thorbecke

Personal details
- Born: 16 December 1809 Amsterdam, Netherlands
- Died: 21 February 1879 (aged 69) The Hague, Netherlands
- Spouse: Maria Johanna Reijnvaan
- Children: 5, including Marie
- Education: Amsterdamse Atheneum

Pieter Philip van Bosse (16 December 1809 – 21 February 1879) was a Dutch liberal politician. Serving as minister of Finance in six cabinets throughout the middle of the 19th century, Van Bosse led many reforms that liberalised the Dutch economy. He led a cabinet himself as Prime Minister of the Netherlands from 4 June 1868 to 4 January 1871.

== Early life and education ==
Pieter Philip van Bosse was born in Amsterdam, to an insurance broker and his wife. Three of his siblings died at a young age, and his father died when he was eleven years old, after which his mother successfully took over the brokerage firm. He attended the Athenaeum Illustre of Amsterdam, and studied Roman and Contemporary Law in Leiden from 20 May 1829 to 25 January 1834.

After his graduation, Van Bosse settled in Weesp as a manufacturer before returning to Amsterdam to work as a lawyer. In 1845, he was appointed referendary of the import and export rights department of the Ministry of Finance, he position he would retain for three years.

== Political career ==
On 3 June 1848, Van Bosse was appointed Minister of Finance. At the time, most of the state's revenue came from excises, and Van Bosse's attempts to introduce a limited income tax and an interest tax proved unsuccessful. Under the premiership of Johan Rudolph Thorbecke, Van Bosse introduced reforms that liberalised the economy. A strong supporter of free trade, he procured the right of transit and discontinued levy on shipping rights on the Rhine and the IJssel. He reformed the coinage by introducing the silver standard and a simpler system of nickels, dimes, quarters, half guilders and rijksdaalders. Moreover, he reformed the postal system, establishing a government monopoly of postal service. Van Bosse's first ministership came to an end in 1853 with the fall of Thorbecke's cabinet.

Van Bosse was elected to the House of Representatives for the constituency of Rotterdam on 14 June 1853, and was re-elected in 1856. In his five years in opposition, he consistently insisted on tax reform and warned for excessive government expenditure. Moreover, Van Bosse won a seat in the municipal council of The Hague in 1857, which he would give up one year later. He served another term as minister of Finance from 12 March 1858 to 22 February 1860. This term was marked by the introduction of inheritance tax. In 1860, Van Bosse returned to the House of Representatives for Zutphen, only to serve a third term as minister of Finance from 10 February to 1 June 1866.

On 3 June 1868, Van Bosse started another term as minister of finance in a cabinet formed by Thorbecke as formateur. However, Thorbecke did not proceed to lead the cabinet, and Van Bosse himself headed the cabinet as Chairman of the Council of Ministers, an office later dubbed prime minister. As prime minister, Van Bosse executed a policy based on financial solidity. The cabinet was responsible for the abolition of the death penalty and the discontinuation of levy on newspapers, stimulating the newspaper industry. When several ministers in the cabinet resigned for different reasons in late 1870, Van Bosse was forced to resign as prime minister. On 4 January 1871, he was succeeded by Thorbecke.

Van Bosse was given the honorary title of Minister of State in 1872. However, to his surprise, Van Bosse was appointed Minister of Colonial Affairs at the age of 68. Due to conflict in Aceh, disagreements within the cabinet and the House of Representatives regarding the Dutch East Indies and his tense relation with the Governor General of the colony, Van Bosse was unable to achieve much. He ceased to be minister in 1872, but served another term as minister of Colonial Affairs from 1877. Van Bosse died in office, on 21 February 1879.

== Private life ==
Van Bosse married Maria Johanna Reijnvaan in Amsterdam on 6 May 1836. The couple had two sons and three daughters. One daughter, Marie Bilders-van Bosse, became a famous landscape painter.

Political offices
Preceded by Pieter Adrianus Ossewaarde	Minister of Finance; 1848–1853	Succeeded by Elisa Cornelis Unico van Doorn
Preceded by Agnites Vrolik	Minister of Finance; 1858–1860	Succeeded by Baron van Hall
Preceded by Nicolaas Olivier	Minister of Finance; 1866	Succeeded by Count Schimmelpenninck van Nijenhuis
Preceded by The Count van Zuylen van Nijevelt	Prime Minister of the Netherlands; 1868–1871	Succeeded by Johan Rudolph Thorbecke
Preceded by Count Schimmelpenninck van Nijenhuis	Minister of Finance; 1868–1871	Succeeded by Pieter Blussé van Oud-Alblas
Preceded by Lodewijk Gerard Brocx	Minister of Colonial Affairs; 1871-1872	Succeeded by Isaäc Dignus Fransen van de Putte
Preceded by Fokko Alting Mees	Minister of Colonial Affairs; 1877-1879	Succeeded by Hendrikus Octavius Wichers
