= Franssen van de Putten =

Dutch ship

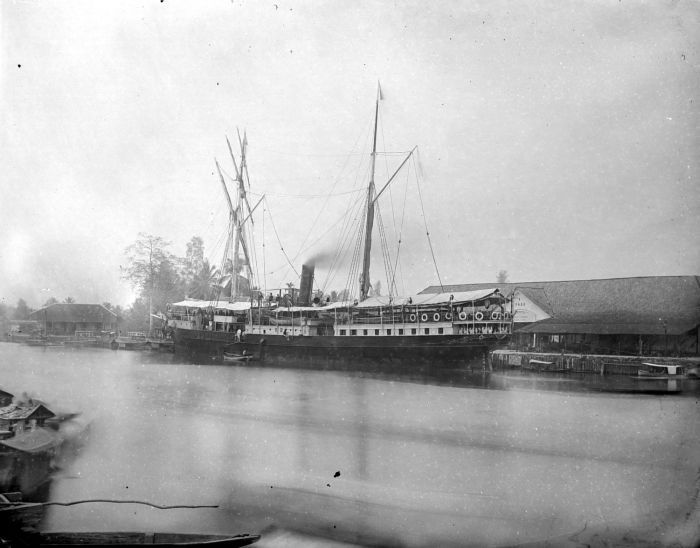
Franssen van de Putten

Franssen van de Putten was a Dutch ship deployed to the Dutch East Indies. It was a three-masted clipper, that launched in October 1864 and was named for Minister of Colonial Affairs and Dutch Prime Minister (briefly) Isaäc Dignus Fransen van de Putte.
