= Pieter Adrianus Ossewaarde =

Dutch technocratic politician

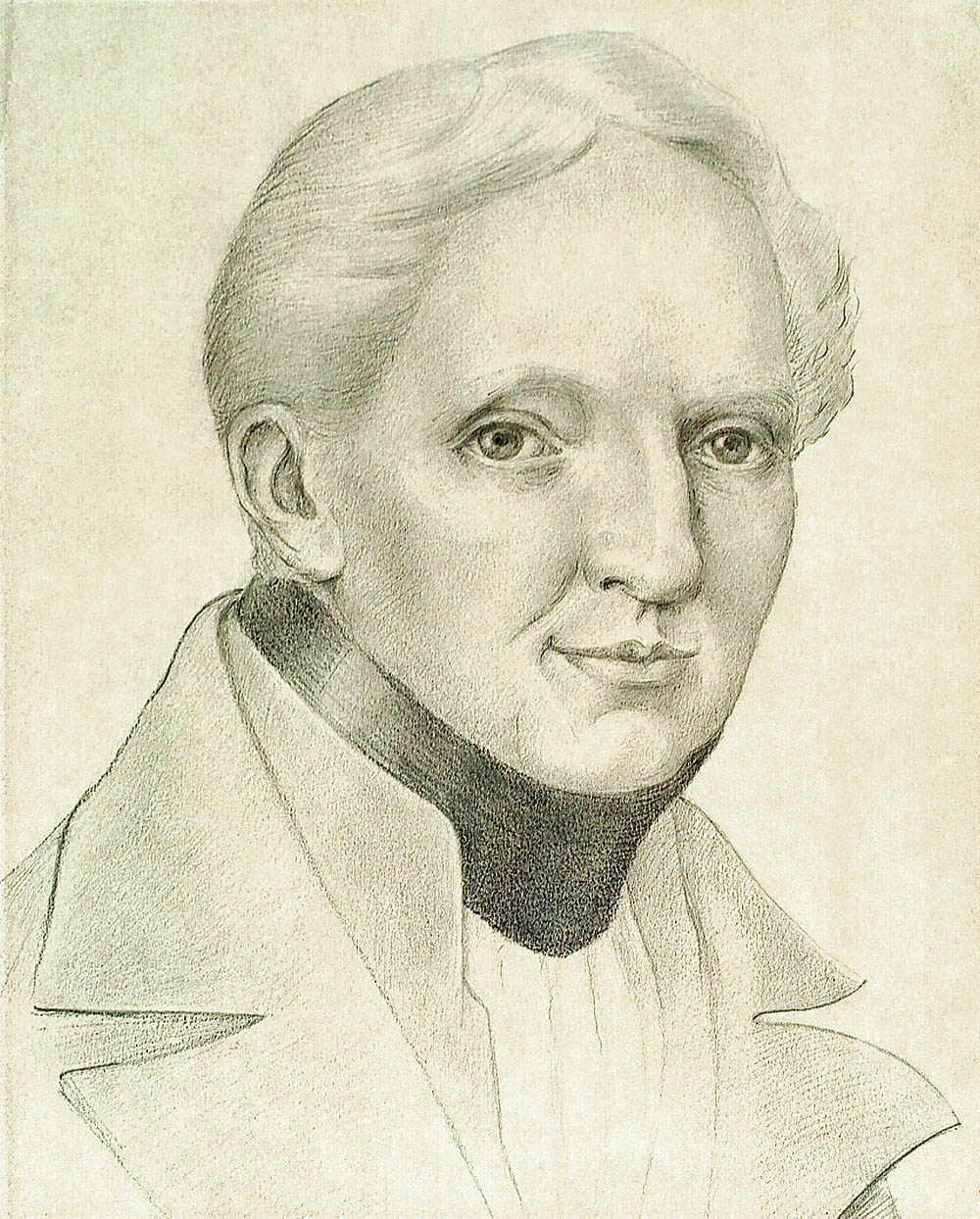
P.A. Ossewaarde

Pieter Adrianus Ossewaarde (14 August 1775 – 21 March 1853) was a Dutch technocratic politician, who was twice interim Minister of Finance, the first time from April to June 1828 and the second time in May and June 1848 after the resignation of Gerrit Schimmelpenninck. He was born in Goes and died in Rijswijk.
