= Gemeentewet =

The Gemeentewet (municipal law) is the law regulating municipalities in the Netherlands. The original Gemeentewet dates from 1851, during Johan Rudolph Thorbecke’s reforms following the Revolution of 1848. The law abolished the Frisian unit of the gritenij office of grytman, which had been a bastion of Frisian autonomy since the restoration of the Frisian elite in 1813 and, with the brief intermission of royal power from 1795–1813, for centuries.
