= Gerrit de Vries (politician) =

Dutch jurist and politician

His Excellency Gerrit de Vries
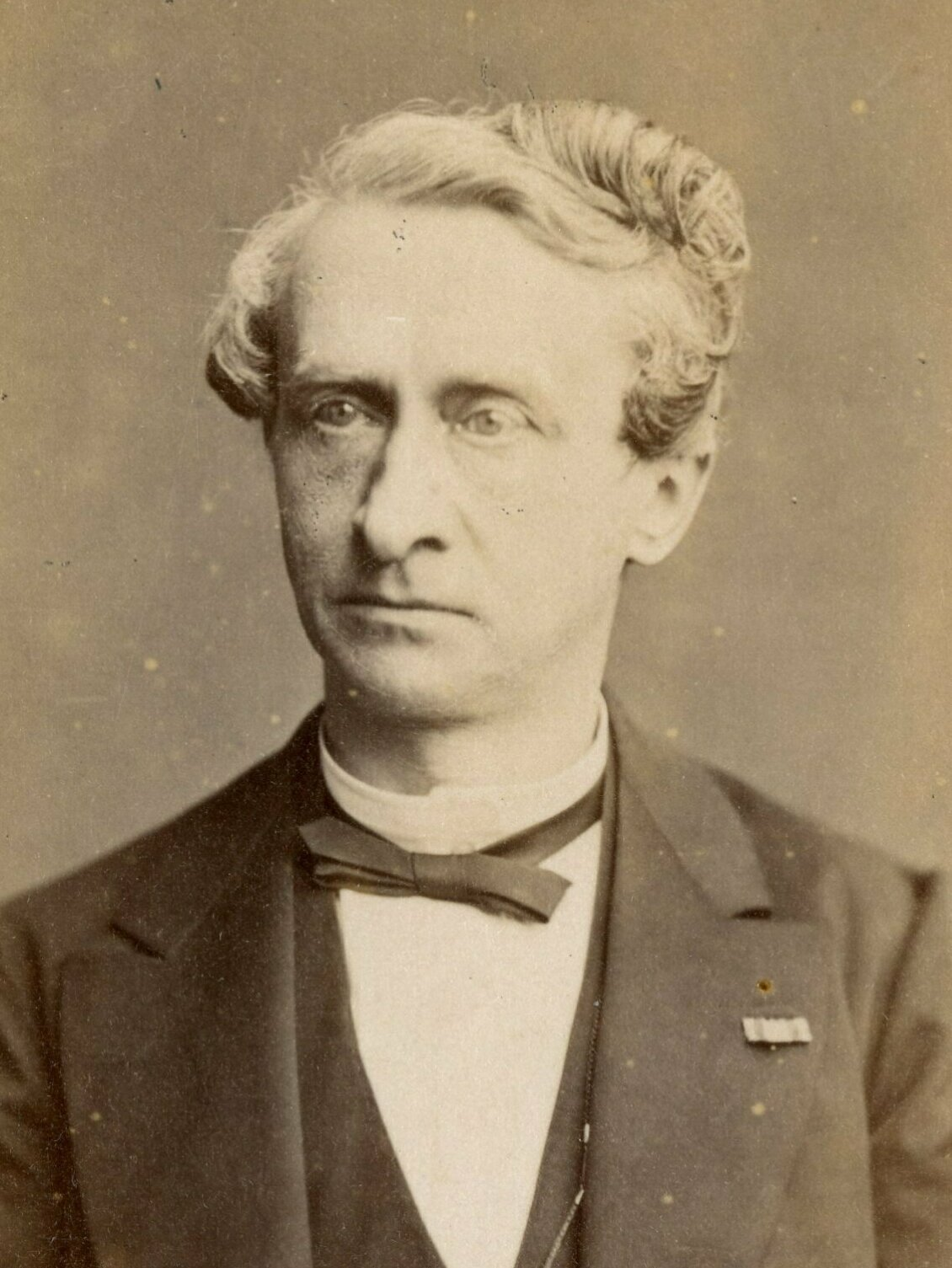
- De Vries, c. 1875

Chairman of the Council of Ministers
- In office 4 June 1872 – 27 August 1874
- Monarch: William III
- Preceded by: Johan Rudolph Thorbecke
- Succeeded by: Jan Heemskerk

Personal details
- Born: Gerrit Abrahamszoon de Vries; 22 February 1818 Haarlem, Netherlands
- Died: 4 March 1900 (aged 82) The Hague, Netherlands
- Spouse: Maria Reuvens
- Children: 4

Gerrit Abrahamszoon de Vries (22 February 1818 – 4 March 1900) was a Dutch jurist and liberal politician who served as Chairman of the Council of Ministers from 4 June 1872 to 27 August 1874.

== Early life and career ==
Gerrit de Vries was born in Haarlem on 22 February 1818 to the Mennonite preacher Abraham de Vries and Hillegonda van Geuns, daughter of Matthias Jansz van Geuns. He graduated from the Stedelijk Gymnasium Haarlem summa cum laude and subsequently studied law and humanities at Leiden University, during which time he was strongly influenced by then-Leiden jurist Johan Rudolph Thorbecke. In 1838, his entry in a competition on the history of the introduction of Roman law in the Dutch Republic was awarded the gold medal. He revised this treatise for his doctoral thesis in law, for which he obtained a doctorate on 18 December 1839. He obtained his doctorate in humanities in June 1842.

In 1840, he moved back to Haarlem to set up practice as a lawyer. In 1843, he successfully passed the examination to become a candidate notary. In 1845, de Vries was appointed public prosecutor at the court in Haarlem. During this period, he also wrote a number of books in which he sought to concretise Thorbecke's body of thought. Aside from his legal practice, De Vries was elected to the Provincial Council of North Holland in September 1850, and subsequently to the municipal council of Haarlem as well. He joined the provincial executive of North Holland in 1853, and became provincial clerk in 1855, thus becoming one of the leading figures in the province's administration. In this position, he devoted his attention to all policy areas, but in particular to the organisation of water boards.

== Career in national politics ==
In 1859, De Vries was offered a professorship of law at the University of Groningen, but he declined. He also declined several offers to become a government minister, including one from Floris Adriaan van Hall to become minister of the interior in 1860. However, he accepted an appointment to the Council of State by Thorbecke, then interior minister, in 1862, prompting him to move to The Hague.

After Thorbecke's death in 1872, De Vries was tasked by King William III to form a new government. His De Vries–Fransen van de Putte cabinet took office on 6 July of that year, with De Vries himself serving as justice minister. The cabinet proved to be a disappointment; De Vries' proposed judicial reforms were narrowly defeated in the House of Representatives, and after a similar defeat of interior minister Johan Herman Geertsema's elections bill, the cabinet resigned on 27 August 1874.

After his ministership, De Vries briefly served as a member of the House of Representatives for Amsterdam, where he spoke on matters of justice, higher education and finance. He returned to the Council of State in 1877, where he served until his retirement at the age of 73 in 1891. In 1879, he was again tasked with forming a cabinet, but this attempt was unsuccessful. Between 1877 and 1898, he served on nine different state commissions, most concerning water management. At the end of this period, he was granted the honorific title Minister of State.

== Private life ==
On 6 May 1847, De Vries married Maria Everdina Reuvens, daughter of the professor Caspar Reuvens. The couple raised three sons, including the famous botanist Hugo de Vries, and one daughter. Gerrit de Vries died in The Hague on 4 March 1900.
