= Lodewijk Gerard Brocx =

Dutch politician

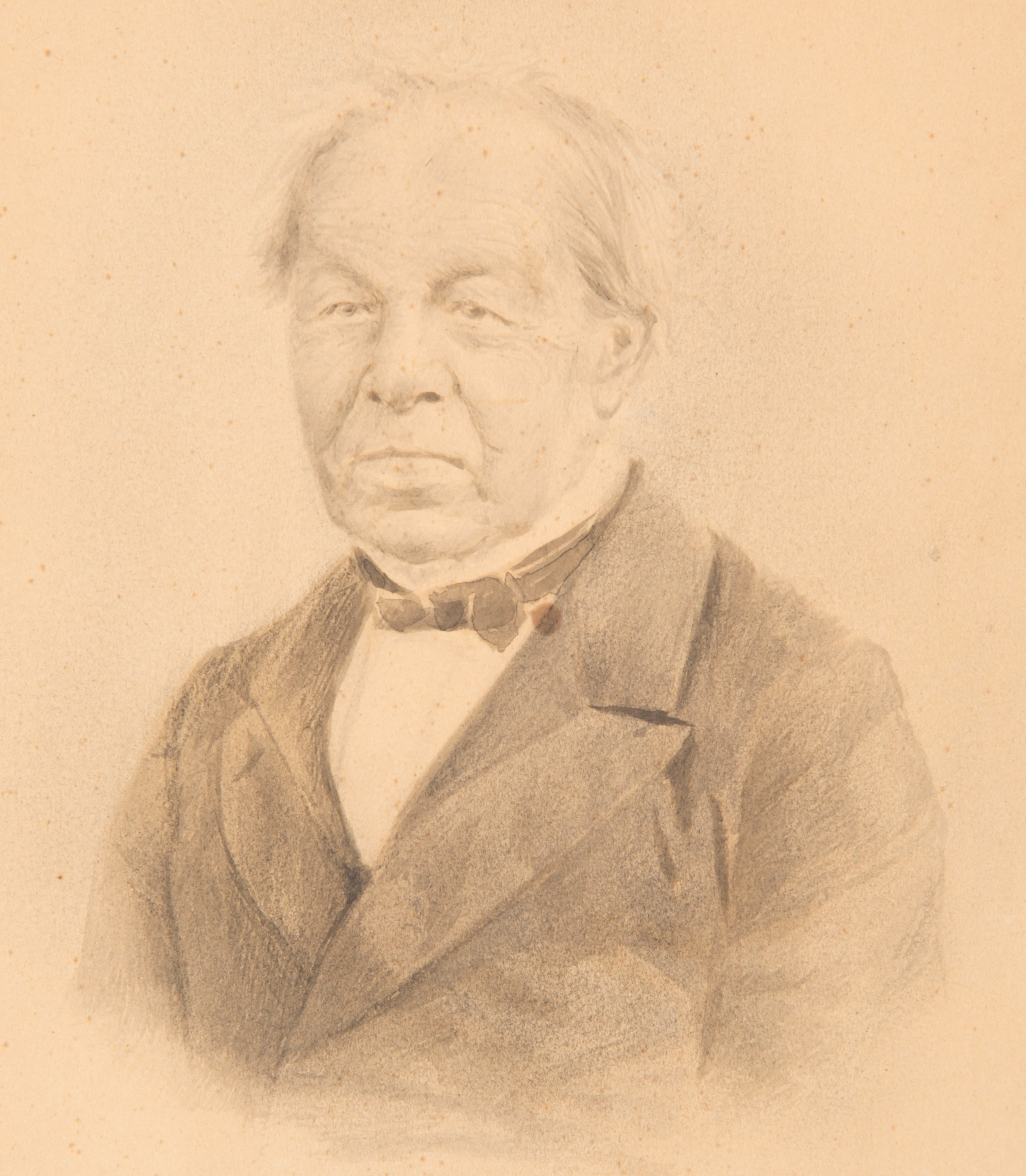
Lodewijk Gerard Brocx

Lodewijk Gerard Brocx (31 December 1819, The Hague – 2 December 1880, The Hague) was a Dutch politician.

Political offices
Preceded by Engelbertus de Waal	Minister of Colonial Affairs; 1870–1871	Succeeded by Pieter Philip van Bosse
