= Johan Rudolph Thorbecke =

Dutch statesman (1798–1872)

His Excellency Johan Rudolph Thorbecke
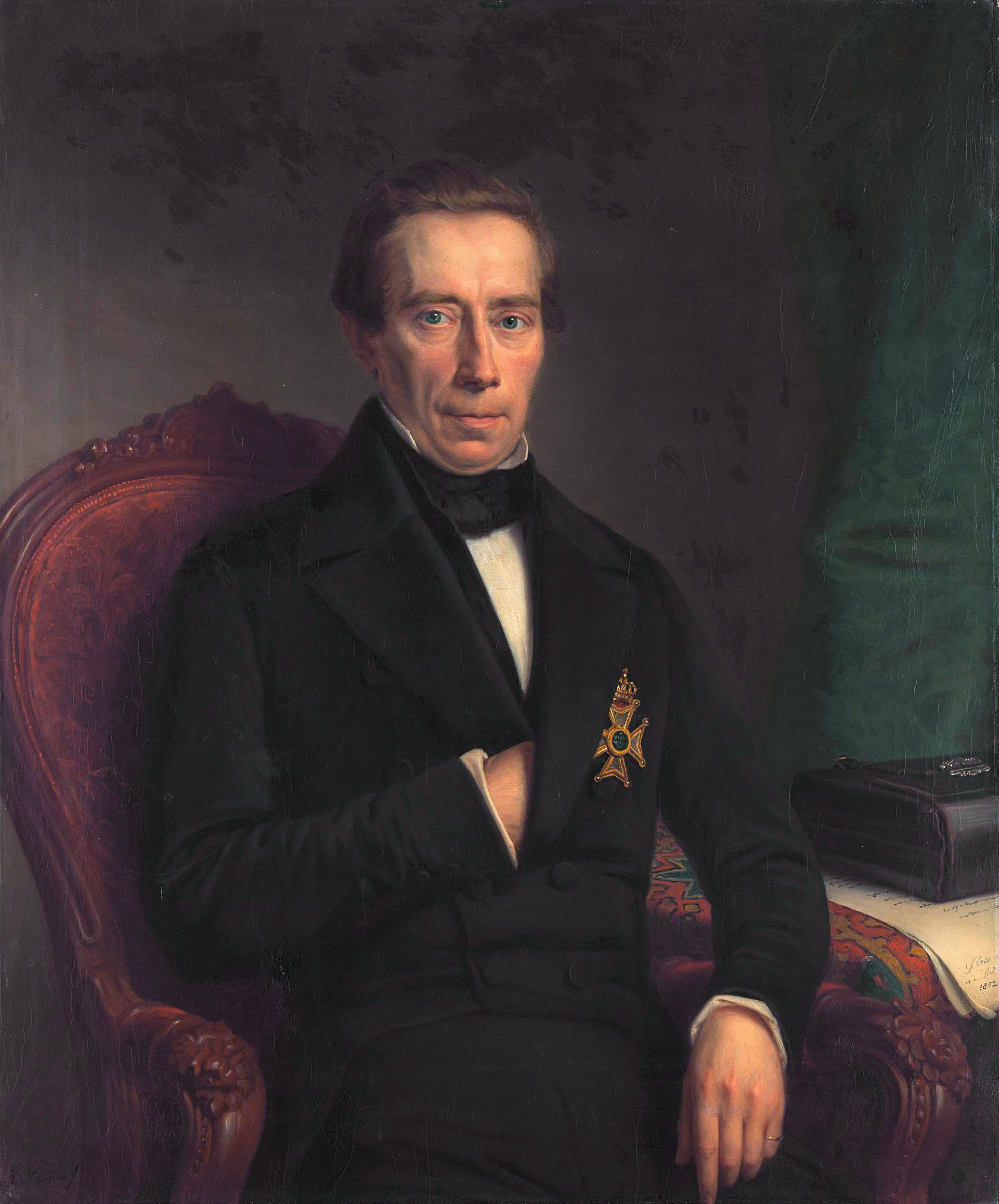
- Portrait by Johan Heinrich Neuman, 1852

Chairman of the Council of Ministers
- In office 4 January 1871 – 4 June 1872
- Monarch: William III
- Preceded by: Pieter Philip van Bosse
- Succeeded by: Gerrit de Vries
- In office 1 February 1862 – 10 February 1866
- Monarch: William III
- Preceded by: Schelto van Heemstra
- Succeeded by: Isaäc Dignus Fransen van de Putte
- In office 1 November 1849 – 19 April 1853
- Monarch: William III
- Preceded by: Jacob de Kempenaer
- Succeeded by: Floris Adriaan van Hall

Minister of the Interior
- In office 4 January 1871 – 4 June 1872
- Preceded by: Cornelis Fock
- Succeeded by: Pieter Philip van Bosse
- In office 1 February 1862 – 10 February 1866
- Preceded by: Schelto van Heemstra
- Succeeded by: Johan Herman Geertsema Carelszoon
- In office 1 November 1849 – 19 April 1853
- Preceded by: Jacob de Kempenaer
- Succeeded by: Gerlach Cornelis Joannes van Reenen
Parliamentary terms
Member of the House of Representatives
In office 19 November 1866 – 4 January 1871
Preceded by	Petrus van der Veen
Succeeded by	Hendrik Jan Smidt
Constituency	Assen
In office 14 March 1866 – 1 October 1866
Preceded by	Johan Herman Geertsema Czn.
Succeeded by	Willem Hendrik Dullert
Constituency	Groningen
In office 17 September 1856 – 31 January 1862
Preceded by	Carel Marius Storm van 's-Gravesande
Succeeded by	Gerard Dumbar
Constituency	Deventer
In office 27 June 1853 – 16 September 1856
Preceded by	Charles de Limpens
Succeeded by	Edmond van Wintershoven
Constituency	Maastricht
In office 17 October 1848 – 31 October 1849
Succeeded by	Jan de Fremery
Constituency	South Holland (1848–1849); Leiden (1849)
In office 21 May 1844 – 19 October 1845
Constituency	South Holland

Personal details
- Born: Johan Rudolph Thorbecke; 14 January 1798 Zwolle, Batavian Republic
- Died: 4 June 1872 (aged 74) The Hague, Netherlands
- Spouse: Adelheid Solger (m. 1836; died 1870)
- Children: 6
- Education: Leiden University
- Occupation: Politician; jurist; historian; professor; author

Johan Rudolph Thorbecke (Note: Dutch pronunciation: [ˈjoːɦɑn ˈrydɔlf ˈtɔrbɛkə]. Sometimes spelt Johan Rudolf or Jan Rudolf.) (14 January 1798 – 4 June 1872) was a Dutch liberal statesman. As the leading figure in the Constitutional Reform of 1848, he is considered the founder of parliamentary democracy in the Netherlands, and the most important Dutch statesman of the 19th century.

Born in Zwolle in 1798 to a financially struggling Lutheran merchant family of German origin, Thorbecke attended a Latin school and studied law and humanities in Amsterdam and Leiden. After receiving his doctorate in 1820, he spent four years in Germany, where met contemporary philosophers and was introduced to the ideas of Romanticism and historism. After his return to the Netherlands, he became a professor, first at Ghent University and, after the Belgian Revolution, at Leiden University. In Leiden, Thorbecke's writings became increasingly political in nature, and he soon became a leading figure in the charge for constitutional reform. He was elected to the House of Representatives in 1844, and made an unsuccessful attempt at constitutional reform as part of a group called the Negenmannen.

Amid the Revolutions of 1848, King William II appointed a constitutional reform commission headed by Thorbecke. In this capacity, he virtually single-handedly wrote a new Constitution of the Netherlands, which was adopted on 3 November of that year in slightly amended form. Among the changes introduced by the new Constitution were ministerial responsibility and direct elections to the House of Representatives, thus turning the Netherlands into a constitutional monarchy with a parliamentary system. During his first ministry (1849–1853), Thorbecke built upon the Constitution with several organic laws, including the Municipalities Act, which introduced local self-government. During his second ministry (1862–1866), he introduced the Hogere Burgerschool, which expanded secondary education to the middle class.

Thorbecke died in 1872, a year into his third ministry. His 1848 Constitution and his subsequent reforms had a lasting impact on Dutch politics and society. He has been commemorated with three statues, in Zwolle, The Hague and Amsterdam, the latter of which is in the centre of the Thorbeckeplein (Thorbecke Square).

== Early life and education ==
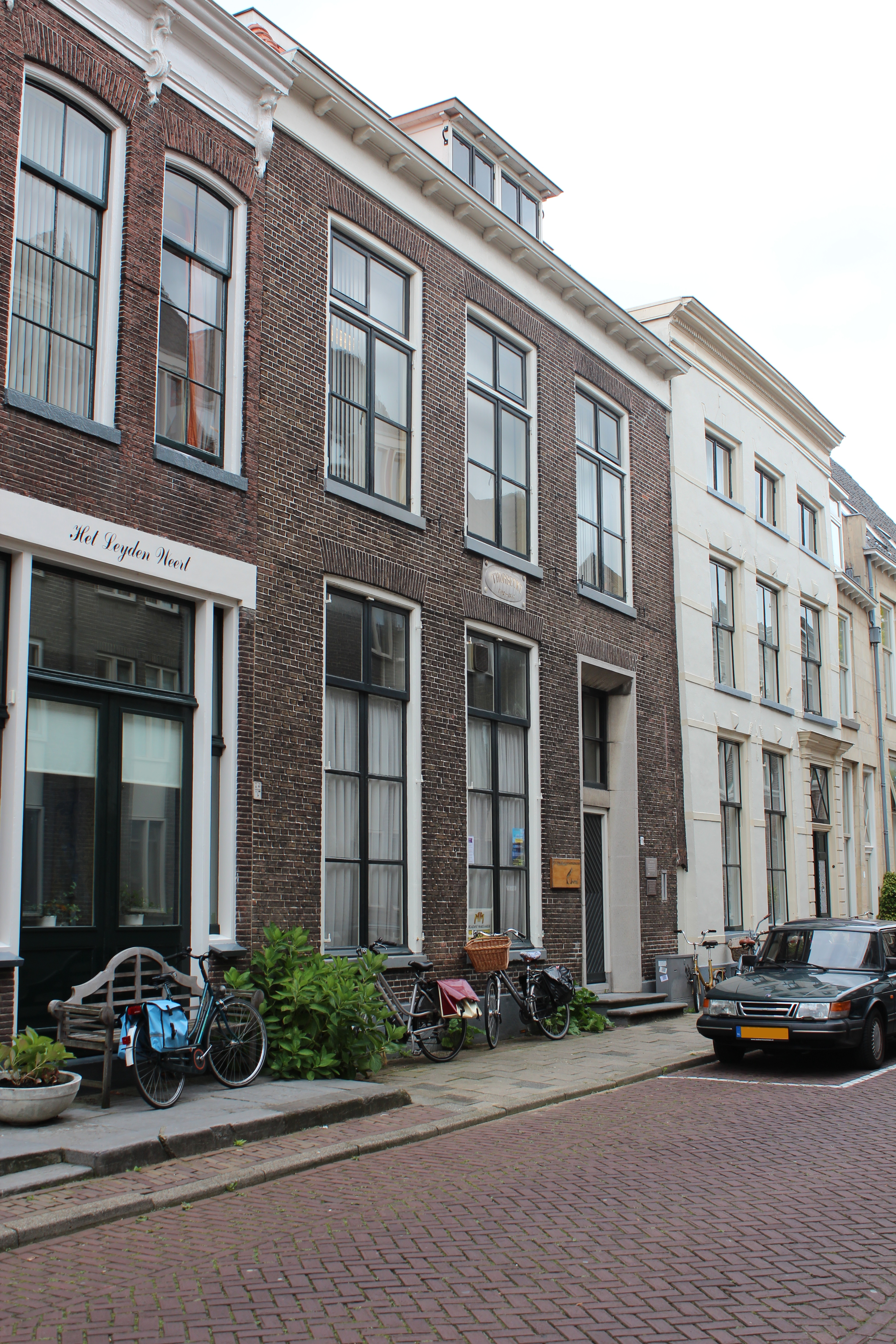
Thorbecke's birthplace in Zwolle, nowadays known as the Thorbeckehuis

Johan Rudolph Thorbecke was born in Zwolle on 14 January 1798. He was descended from a Lutheran family originally from Osnabrück, of which one member had settled in Zwolle in the mid-17th century, where he worked as a postmaster and freight forwarder. His descendants continued to engage in trade and were members of the upper middle class. Thorbecke's father Frederik Willem was a tobacco manufacturer, while his mother Christine Regina was his father's cousin, born in Osnabrück. Frederik Willem's business suffered badly from the anti-British policies of the French occupiers, and his tobacco factory went bankrupt in 1803, after which he was unable to find another source of employment and would spend most of his time on the education of Johan Rudolph and his younger brother.

Johan Rudolph proved to be diligent and exemplary at a young age, showing intelligence and curiosity. Because of the sacrifices of his parents, who continued to struggle with financial problems, he was able to enjoy a decent education. He enjoyed primary education in his birthplace and in Amsterdam, where he lived until 1806, and attended a Latin school back in Zwolle, where he received a thorough education in Greek and Latin languages and antiquity and mathematics. Most of all he felt drawn to history, particularly to the works of Arnold Hermann Ludwig Heeren, professor of philosophy and history at the University of Göttingen. Thorbecke was named primus of his class and, in accordance with custom at the time, delivered a public Latin oration on Christiaan Gottlieb Heyne, the then-recently deceased professor of classical philology in Göttingen.

After graduating from the Latin school in the summer of 1814, Thorbecke continued his studies at the Athenaeum Illustre of Amsterdam, moving in with the Lutheran minister G.F. Sartorius, a friend of his father's. He attended lectures of Jean Henri van Swinden, and David Jacob van Lennep became his foremost mentor. When the philological faculty of Leiden University organised a competition on Cicero's De Oratore in 1817, Thorbecke submitted an entry entitled De principio philosophiae moralis secundum Cicernonem, and was awarded a gold medal on 8 February 1818. That same year, he enrolled at Leiden University, where he continued his studies and was awarded two more gold medals for treatises in academic competitions, one on Cicero's philosophy in 1818, and on the systems of the Greek philosophers in 1820. He received his doctorate on 19 June 1820 summis honoribus after defending his thesis entitled Disputatio historico-critica inauguralis de C. Asinio Pollione

== Academic career ==
=== In Germany (1820–1824) ===
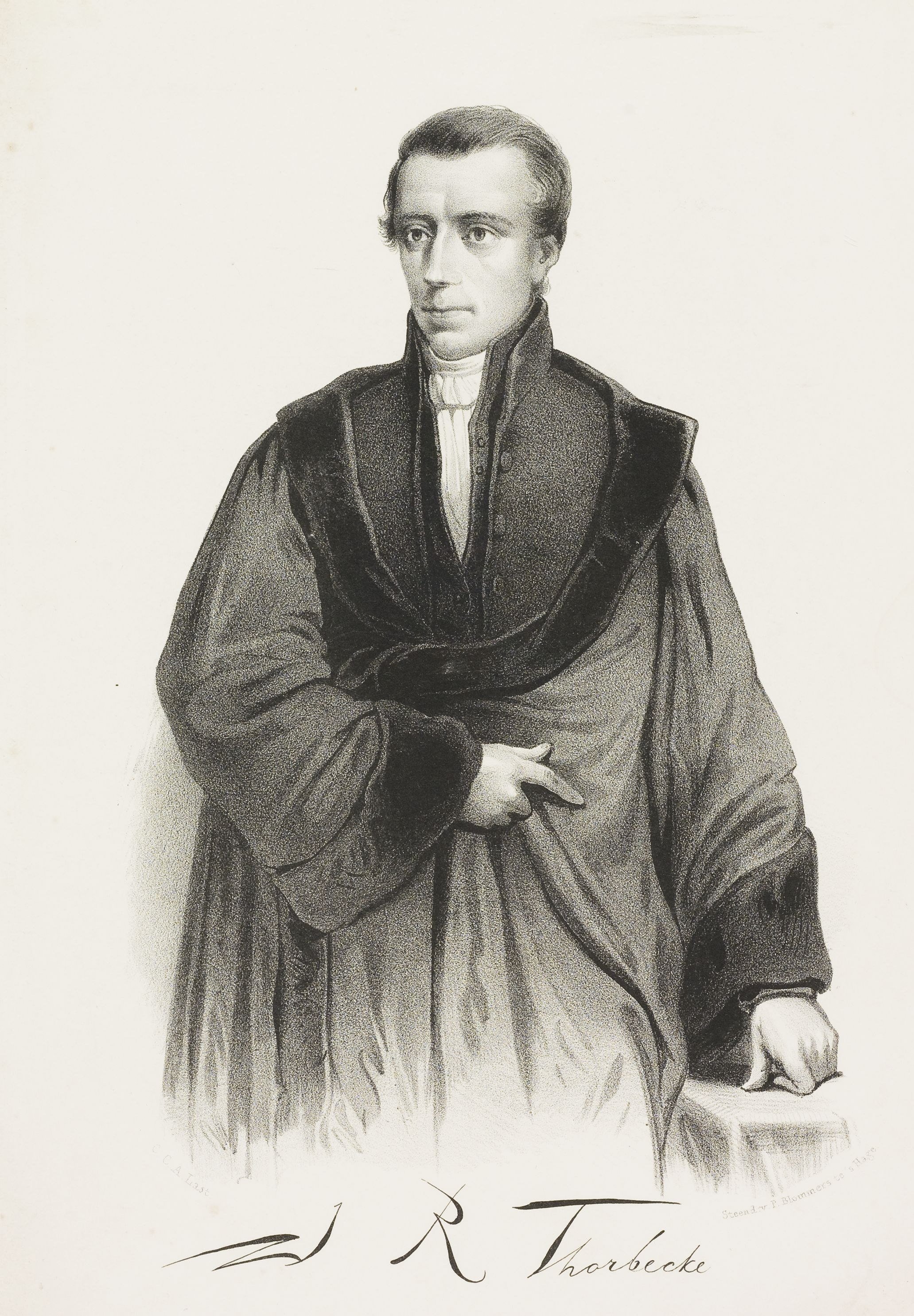
A young Thorbecke

Shortly after receiving his doctorate, Thorbecke was granted a state scholarship of 1,200 guilders for a journey to the foremost universities and libraries in Germany. The scholarship had been made possible by the efforts of Leiden professor Joan Melchior Kemper, who was a friend of education minister Anton Reinhard Falck, and was renewed the following year. Thorbecke started his journey in the fall of 1820, at the age of 22, and travelled through Germany for two years, visiting Göttingen, Marburg, Giessen, Heidelberg, Stuttgart, München, Erlangen, Jena, Dresden and Berlin. In Giessen, he was offered but declined a professorship, and met the philosopher Friedrich Wilhelm Joseph Schelling. In Erlangen, where he stayed in mid-1821, he befriended August von Platen-Hallermünde. In Berlin, he stayed with Henriette Solger, widow of the philosopher Karl Wilhelm Ferdinand Solger, who had died in 1819.

Thorbecke returned to the Netherlands in 1822, hoping to succeed Van de Wijnperse as professor of philosophy in Leiden, but J. Nieuwenhuis, professor in Deventer, was chosen instead, as Thorbecke was deemed too young. A discouraged and somewhat embittered Thorbecke returned to Germany, where he lectured as an extraordinary professor at Giessen and subsequently Göttingen, where he gave open lectures on the philosophy of history. He met and befriended the poet and philologist Ludwig Tieck in Dresden in 1821, and in 1824 he published his treatise Über das Wesen und den organischen Charakter der Geschichte ("On the Nature and the Organic Character of History") at Göttingen, his first academic paper since obtaining his doctorate.

In the four years he spent in Germany, Thorbecke was introduced to historism and Romanticism, and developed emotionally and spiritually. He was introduced to Friedrich Schelling's speculative natural philosophy and Georg Wilhelm Friedrich Hegel's history of the world-soul, but quickly distanced himself from such methodic-philosophical approaches to history. Instead, he became an adherent of the German historical school. In his writings, he articulated a kind of idealistic empiricism aimed at explaining organic growth in history. Each era had its own significance as a historical space of individuality and meaning-making, while at once being part of an ever-evolving whole, and serving a purpose in that process. As an expression of this duality of diachronicity and synchronicity, one must identify the era's unique principles of structure, and the organic renewal necessary to meet its needs. Thorbecke would maintain the philosophical principles he found during his time in Germany for the rest of his life, and sought to apply these principles in his later political career.

=== In Ghent and Leiden (1824–1844) ===
Upon his return to the Netherlands in the fall of 1824, Thorbecke settled in Amsterdam, where he wrote his first political work of significance, Bedenkingen aangaande het Regt en Den Staat ("Concerns about the Law and the State"). The work, which was published anonymously in 1825, was a reflection on the Brieven over het natuurregt ("Letters on Natural Law"), published in 1823 by professor of Dutch language and philology Johannes Kinker, which were in turn directed against Willem Bilderdijk's legal theory. It managed to gain some attention, and Anton Reinhard Falck, who had previously provided Thorbecke with his state scholarship, now secured him a professorship of political history at Ghent University, which had been established in 1817 by King William I. He arrived in Ghent in July 1825, and delivered his inaugural address, entitled De disciplinarum historicopoliticarum argumento, on 4 October of the same year.

Thorbecke enjoyed his time in Ghent. In his first year, he taught history of European politics, but later expanded to statistics and public economy. Among his students were Jules Van Praet and Theodorus Marinus Roest van Limburg. George Bergmann, another one of his students, would describe Thorbecke as "a thin, stiff, neatly dressed gentleman from Holland, who lived a very frugal life and spent most of his days in his study", and his lectures as "thoroughly learned, well-studied and correctly recited, but appreciated to their true worth by only a few students". During this time, he published a number of works on the subject of education. In these works, written in a time of Roman Catholic opposition to the state's monopoly on education, Thorbecke argued for freedom of education. His time in Ghent came to an abrupt end in 1830, when the outbreak of the Belgian Revolution prompted him to return to the north. The following year, Thorbecke became professor of Diplomacy and Modern History at Leiden University, where his students would describe him as a distant, analytical mind, living a secluded life in his study.

Originally a loyal supporter of the conservative government of King William I, Thorbecke developed a more critical view of the government and indeed the autocratic system of government throughout the 1830s. His increasingly strong support for constitutional reform is shown in a series of essays, starting with Aanteekening op de grondwet ("Annotation on the Constitution") in 1839. In this work, his first political treatise, he subjects the existing constitution and its application to a vigorous critique and calls for its revision. Aanteekeningen cemented Thorbecke's role as the leader of the charge for constitutional reform. The year after its release, the Provincial Council of South Holland elected Thorbecke to the extraordinary parliament tasked with reviewing the constitutional amendment which had become necessary after the Belgian secession. The amendment was tabled on 4 September 1840, and Thorbecke was among the seven members to vote against because of its lack of meaningful reforms. Even before the amendment was tabled, Thorbecke had published a draft constitution which was intended to demonstrate the practical feasibility of the ideas he had set out in his Aanteekeningen. The climax of this essay series was Over het hedendaags staatsburgerschap ("On Contemporary Citizenship"), published in 1844, in which he argued that universal suffrage would eventually be unavoidable.

== Political career ==
=== Constitutional reform (1844–1848) ===
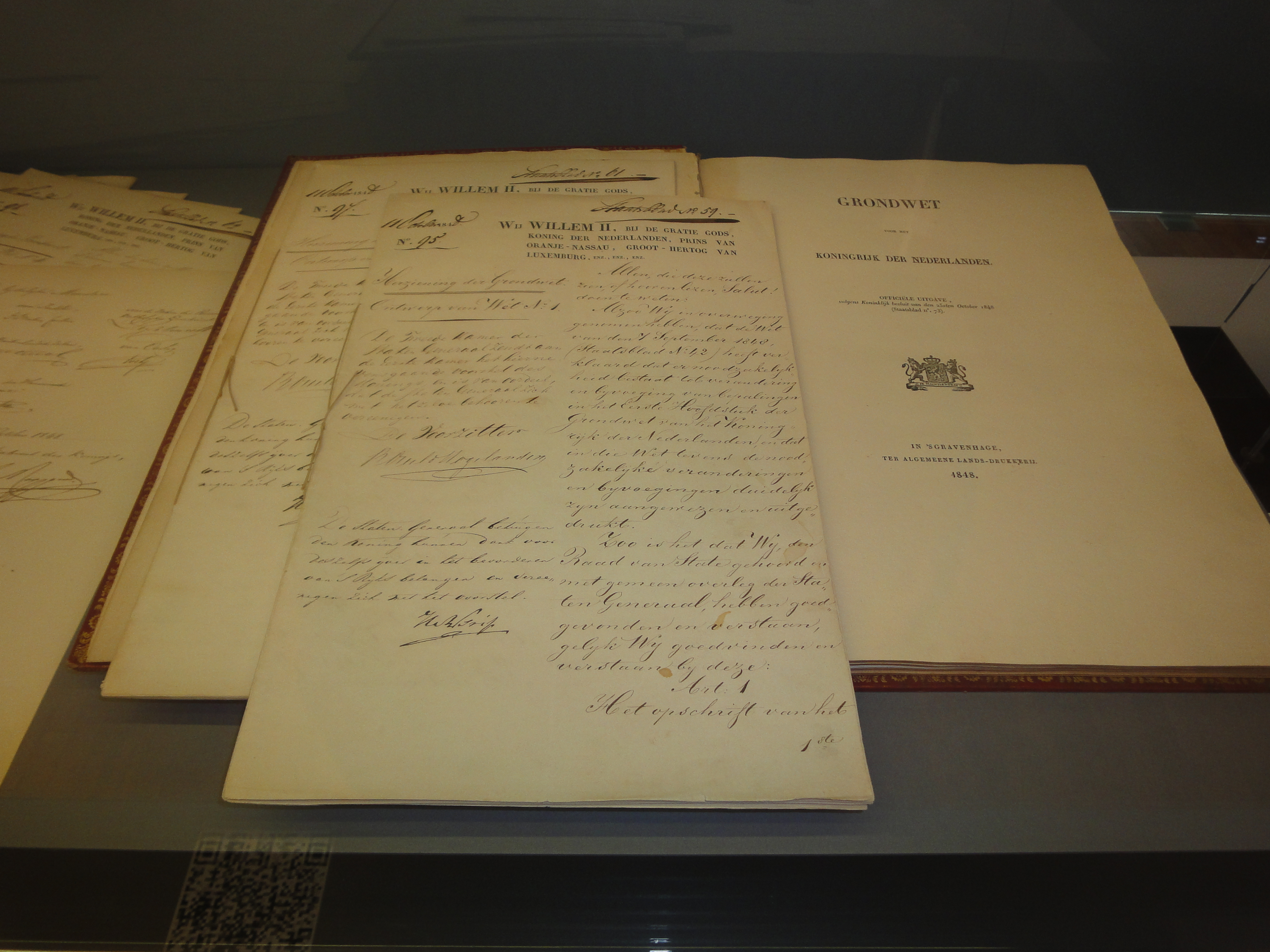
The 1848 constitutional amendment

On 21 May 1844, Thorbecke was first elected to the House of Representatives for South Holland, along with a number of other liberals such as Jacobus Mattheüs de Kempenaer and Lambertus Dominicus Storm. In the House, he developed into the leader of the liberal opposition and, on 10 December of that year, joined forces with eight like-minded members in an attempt to amend the Constitution in the so-called Voorstel der Negenmannen ("Proposition of the Nine Men"). This proposition went beyond Thorbecke's earlier draft Constitution, including not only the introduction of ministerial responsibility, but also direct elections to the House of Representatives. However, on 30 May 1845, their proposal was defeated by 34 votes to 21, after which King William II felt no need to present any counterproposal.

Four years later, with much of Europe convulsed by the Revolutions of 1848, William II agreed to the formation of a commission tasked with drafting a constitutional revision and forming a new government. On 17 March 1848, he appointed the commission, which included Thorbecke, De Kempenaer, Storm, Dirk Donker Curtius and Lodewijk Caspar Luzac. The commission first met two days later, on a Sunday morning, and unanimously elected Thorbecke as its chair. The commission's task to form a new government was thwarted by London envoy Gerrit Schimmelpenninck, who offered his services to the King as formateur. When the commission had almost finished assembling a new government, in which Thorbecke would have become interior minister, the King relieved the commission of this task, having appointed Schimmelpenninck instead. His government took office on 25 March, and included some members of the commission, though not Thorbecke, who had little confidence in Schimmelpenninck and had opposed his appointment.

The commission finalised its proposals on 9 April, and presented its report on 11 April. The proposals included the introduction of ministerial responsibility, the direct election of the House of Representatives and the Senate, as well as provincial and municipal councils, local self-government and freedom of church denominations and education. The changes were in large part created by Thorbecke and based on his earlier constitutional writings. The draft constitution was somewhat reluctantly approved by the States General in slightly amended form, and was proclaimed on 3 November 1848. The new constitution established civil rights and parliamentary competences, and introduced direct election of members of the House of Representatives and ministerial responsibility, thus limiting the power of the King and turning the country into a constitutional monarchy with a parliamentary system.

=== First ministry (1848–1853) ===
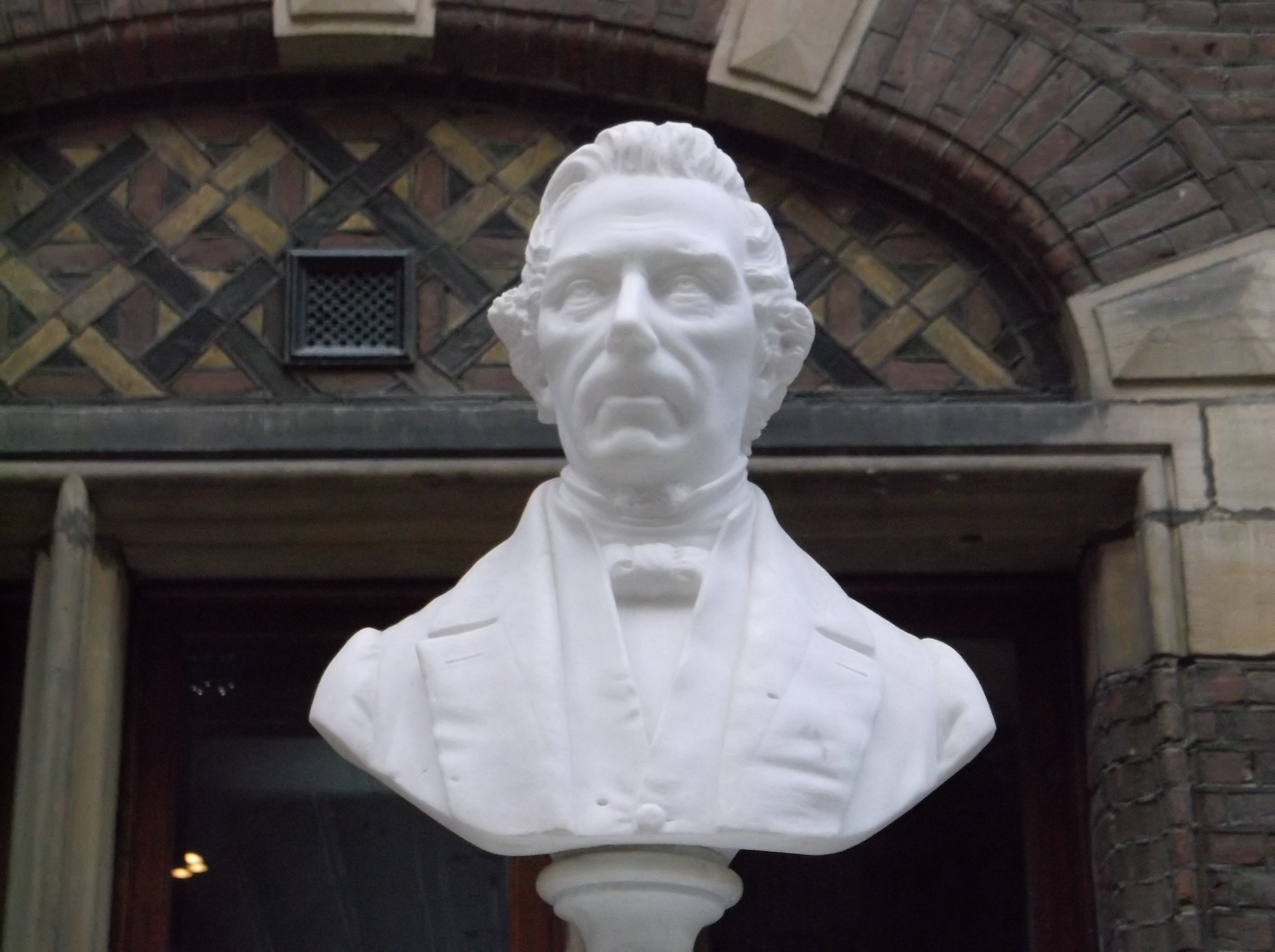
Bust of Thorbecke in the Binnenhof in The Hague

Liberals won a majority in the inaugural November 1848 general election, with Thorbecke elected in four districts and taking his seat for the district of Leiden. The incumbent ministry, led by Donker Curtius and De Kempenaer, attempted to enact organic laws relating to elections and municipalities, but faced a number of defeats and resignations, as well as fierce parliamentary opposition from Thorbecke. The ministry resigned in September 1849 after the House adopted a hostile response to the speech from the throne drafted by Thorbecke. Although Thorbecke was widely seen as the logical formateur of a new ministry, King William III, who had ascended the throne in March 1849, was opposed to him, regarding him as unmanageable and anti-monarchist. Despite this initial reluctance, William III conceded in October 1849 and appointed Thorbecke as formateur. Thorbecke's first ministry took office on 13 November, with Thorbecke himself serving as interior minister. He simultaneously resigned his seat in the House, regarding the two offices incompatible.

As interior minister, Thorbecke set about preparing several organic laws in early 1850. In early May of that year, he tabled bills for the Elections Act and the Provinces Act, which the De Kempenaer ministry had previously attempted in vain to enact. Despite parliamentary opposition from Guillaume Groen van Prinsterer, the two bills passed on 12 July 1850. These legislative successes were followed by the Nationality Act and the Parliamentary Inquiry Act in July 1850. Most important of the organic laws, however, was the Municipalities Act, which was tabled on 3 March 1851. The bill sought to put the municipal council at the head of the municipality and establish municipal self-government, and was adopted on 29 June 1851. With these organic laws, Thorbecke sought to put to practice and expand upon the Constitution of 1848, and they became the basis for democratic government in the Netherlands.

Despite these successes, Thorbecke's reforms faced increasing resistance, and he was criticised for his haughtiness and his strained relationship with the King. Moreover, the ministry's colonial policy was subject to criticism for being insufficiently progressive. In 1853, the Catholic Church sought to restore its episcopal hierarchy in the Netherlands. Common people, Protestant clergymen, and conservative notables opposed this in the anti-papal Aprilbeweging ("April Movement"). Thorbecke, who remained passive in the issue in defence of the separation of church and state, was accused of Catholic sympathies. On 16 April, after the King had publicly expressed his sympathy with the movement in contradiction with the ministry's position, the ministry requested that the King either dismiss it or "remove all doubt and misunderstanding in the most explicit manner, by means of a clear, public statement". On 19 April, the King opted for the former.

=== Later ministries (1853–1872) ===
The subsequent 1853 general election resulted in a defeat of the liberals. Thorbecke stood as a candidate in the majority-Catholic districts of Breda and Maastricht, where two Catholics and one liberal stood aside and endorsed Thorbecke. Catholics regarded him as someone who had made the reestablishment of the episcopal hierarchy possible, and had paid a high price for doing so. Thorbecke was elected in both districts and opted to represent the latter, becoming the only non-Catholic to represent an overwhelmingly Catholic district in Dutch history. He was installed as a member of the House of Representatives on 27 June 1853, and would spend nine years as leader of the opposition, leading a small group of "Constitutionals". In 1854, he fiercely questioned foreign minister Floris Adriaan van Hall on the government's policy regarding the Crimean War, pleading for the country's neutrality. In 1857, interior minister Gerrit Simons, who had been a leading figure in the April Movement, tabled an amendment of the Primary Education Act that sought to reintroduce education in "Christian virtues" in primary schools, but this bill, too, met fierce resistance from Thorbecke.

The collapse of the conservative ministry in 1862 brought Thorbecke back into power. On 31 January 1862, he started his second term as Minister of the Interior and chairman of the Council of Ministers. Thorbecke's relationship with the King had improved because the focus of his reforms had shifted from politics to economics. Despite the increased disunity among the liberals, his ministry lasted for four years because of the support of the Catholics. One of Thorbecke's first acts in his second term was the abolition of the governmental departments for religious affairs. Other notable achievements include the construction of several canals, several acts on healthcare, the municipal tax reform in 1865 and the Secondary Education Act in May 1863. The latter would later prove to be one of his governmental masterpieces. In addition to the gymnasium, the new Hogere Burgerschool (HBS) school type would provide education to some hundreds of thousands of students between 1864 and 1974. As a result of a reform in 1968, the HBS was succeeded by the school types like HAVO and Atheneum.

The ministry collapsed on 10 February 1866 and Thorbecke resigned after a conflict regarding criminal law in the Dutch East Indies.

Thorbecke returned to being leader of the opposition in the House of Representatives. In 1868, he formed the Van Bosse-Fock ministry, but did not take part in the ministry himself. Three years later, after this ministry had collapsed over foreign policy, the 73-year-old Thorbecke did not hesitate to start his third term. In December 1871 however, he fell ill and never fully recovered. One of his last acts as minister was to grant permission to the later feminist leader Aletta Jacobs to enrol at the University of Groningen, thereby becoming the first woman to attend a Dutch university. Thorbecke died at his home in The Hague two days later, on 4 June 1872, at the age of 74. His modest funeral in The Hague attracted thousands of mourners.

== Private life ==
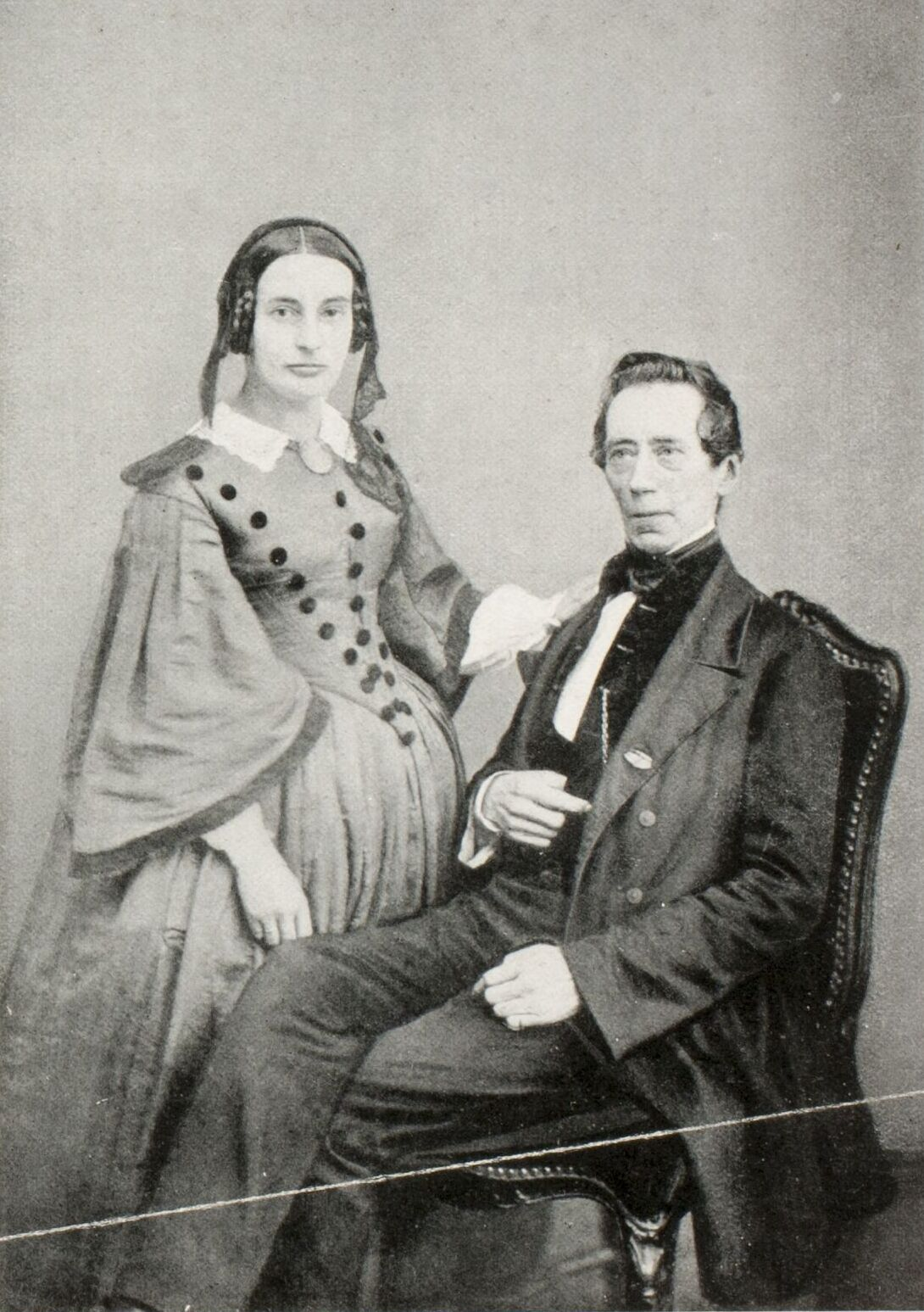
Johan Rudolph and Adelheid Thorbecke

Thorbecke married the 19-year-old Adelheid Solger in Tharandt on 15 July 1836. Adelheid was the daughter of the philosopher Karl Wilhelm Ferdinand Solger and his widow Henriette, with whom Thorbecke had stayed for some time in 1819, during his travels through Germany. Despite their age difference, the marriage was thought to be a happy one, and Molhuysen and Blok describe Thorbecke's private life as exemplary. Thorbecke's friend Nicolaas Olivier described him as a gentle husband and father, and Adelheid as "a very vivacious little woman; always cheerful, always the same, always generous and natural... No one ever saw her as anything other than friendly and warm-hearted, and yet these gentle manners were matched by a character full of strength and decisiveness." According to the same account, nothing written by Thorbecke was ever published without first being read by his wife.

The couple had four sons and two daughters as well as two sons who died in infancy. Among their children was the jurist Willem Thorbecke (1843–1917). The American development economist Erik Thorbecke is a descendant of Johan Rudolph Thorbecke.

== Legacy ==
Hated by some (he was not a man of concessions), he is nowadays considered a towering figure in Dutch parliamentary history. He is widely known as the most important Dutch statesman of the 19th century, and has been called the most important since Johan de Witt two centuries prior. There are three statues of Thorbecke. On 18 May 1876, about four years after his death, bronze statue created by Ferdinand Leenhoff was placed on the Reguliersplein in Amsterdam, which was subsequently renamed to Thorbeckeplein. A second statue created by Hans Bayens was unveiled on the Stationsplein in his birthplace Zwolle in 1992. A monument created by Thom Puckey was unveiled by then-prime minister Mark Rutte on the Lange Voorhout in The Hague on 17 February 2017. Moreover, a chamber in the Binnenhof, the Dutch parliament building, is named after him.

Thorbecke wrote many articles on history and several newspaper articles (especially in the Journal de La Haye) on topics of the day. He published a study on the philosophy of history (in German). Thorbecke's parliamentary speeches have been published.

== See also ==
- Alexis de Tocqueville

== Notes ==
Political offices
Preceded by Jacob de Kempenaer	Minister of the Interior; 1849–1853	Succeeded by Gerlach Cornelis Joannes van Reenen
Preceded by Jacob de Kempenaer	Chairman of the Council of Ministers; 1849–1853	Succeeded by Baron van Hall
Preceded by Baron van Heemstra	Minister of the Interior; 1862–1866	Succeeded by Johan Herman Geertsema Czn.
Preceded by Baron van Heemstra	Chairman of the Council of Ministers; 1862–1866	Succeeded by Isaäc Dignus Fransen van de Putte
Preceded by Cornelis Fock	Minister of the Interior; 1871–1872	Succeeded by Pieter Philip van Bosse
Preceded by Pieter Philip van Bosse	Chairman of the Council of Ministers; 1871–1872	Succeeded by Gerrit de Vries
