= Gerrit =

Gerrit is a Dutch male name meaning "brave with the spear", the Dutch and Frisian form of Gerard. People with this name include:

- Gerrit Achterberg (1905–1962), Dutch poet
- Gerrit van Arkel (1858–1918), Dutch architect
- Gerrit Badenhorst (born 1962), South African powerlifter and professional strongman competitor
- Gerrit Battem (c. 1636 – 1684), Dutch landscape painter
- Gerrit Beneker (1882–1934), American painter and illustrator
- Gerrit Berckheyde (1638–1698), Dutch painter
- Gerrit Berkhoff (1901–1996), Dutch chemist and university rector
- Gerrit Cornelis Berkouwer (1903–1996), Dutch theologian
- Gerrit Berveling (born 1944), Dutch Esperanto author
- Gerrit Blaauw (1924–2018), Dutch computer engineer
- Gerrit de Blanken (1894–1961), Dutch pottery artist
- Gerrit van Bloclant (1578–1650), Dutch Renaissance painter
- Gerrit Bol (1906–1989), Dutch mathematician
- Gerrit Braamcamp (1699–1771), Dutch distiller, timber merchant and art collector
- Gerrit den Braber (1929–1997), Dutch songwriter and lyricist
- Gerrit Broekstra (born 1941), Dutch scientist and professor
- Gerrit Cole (born 1990), American baseball pitcher
- Gerrit Gerritsz Cuyp (c. 1565–1644), Dutch painter and stained glass artist
- Gerrit J. Diekema (1859–1930), American politician
- Gerrit van Dijk (1938–2012), Dutch animator, film maker, actor and painter
- Gerrit Dou (1613–1675), Dutch painter
- Gerrit L. Dox (1784–1847), American politician
- Gerrit Faulhaber (1912–1951), Dutch-Indonesian footballer
- Gerrit Fauser (born 1989), German ice hockey player
- Gerrit Ferreira (born 1948), South African businessman
- Gerrit Fischer (1916–1984), Dutch footballer
- Gerrit Fokkema (born 1954), Australian photographer
- Gerrit Forbes (1836–1906), American judge
- Gerrit De Geest (born 1960), Belgian legal scholar
- Gerrit van Gelderen (1926–1994), Dutch-born Irish naturalist, wildlife broadcaster, film-maker, illustrator and cartoonist
- Gerrit Van Gestel (born 1958), Belgian former cyclist
- Gerrit Glas (born 1954), Dutch philosopher and psychiatrist
- Gerrit Glomser (born 1975), Austrian racing cyclist
- Gerrit W. Gong (born 1953), American religious leader
- Gerrit David Gratama (1874–1965), Dutch artist, writer and museum director
- Gerrit Govaars (1866–1954), Dutch teacher and Salvation Army officer
- Gerrit Graham (born 1949), American actor and songwriter
- Gerrit Holdijk (1944–2015), Dutch politician
- Gerrit Holtmann (born 1995), German footballer
- Gerrit van Houten (1866–1934), Dutch painter and artist
- Gerrit van Iterson (1878–1972), Dutch botanist and professor
- Gerrit de Jager (born 1954), Dutch cartoonist
- Gerrit de Jong Jr. (1892–1978), Dutch-born American art teacher, pedagogue and professor
- Gerrit P. Judd (1803–1873), American physician and missionary
- Gerrit Kastein (1910–1943), Dutch communist, neurologist and WWII resistance fighter
- Gerrit Hendrik Kersten (1882–1948), Dutch Christian minister and politician
- Gerrit Kleerekoper (1897–1943), Dutch gymnastics coach
- Gerrit Komrij (1944–2012), Dutch poet
- Gerrit Korteweg (born 1937), Dutch swimmer
- Gerrit Kouwenaar (1923–2014), Dutch journalist, translator, poet and prose writer
- Gerrit Krol (1934−2013), Dutch author, essayist and writer
- Gerrit Kruize (1923–2009), American field hockey player
- Ger Lagendijk (1941–2010), Dutch footballer
- Gerrit Lamberts (1776–1850), Dutch painter and museum curator
- Gerrit Y. Lansing (1783–1862), American politician
- Gerrit Lekkerkerker (1922–1999), Dutch mathematician
- Gerrit Lundens (1622–1683), Dutch painter
- Gerrit van der Meer (born 1950), Dutch television producer, film producer and unit production manager
- Gerrit Nauber (born 1992), German footballer
- Gerrit Niekoop (born 1934), Surinamese football player
- Gerrit Noordzij (1931–2022), Dutch typographer, typeface designer, and author
- Gerrit Olivier (born 19??), South African academic and diplomat
- Gerrit Oosting (1941–2012), Dutch politician
- Gerrit Opperman (born 1945), South African Army General
- Gerrit Paape (1752–1803), Dutch earthenware and stoneware painter, poet, journalist, novelist, judge, columnist and civil servant
- Gerrit Patist (1947–2005), Dutch sculptor and ceramist
- Gerrit Pels (1893–1966), Dutch astronomer
- Gerrit Plomp (born 1963), Dutch footballer
- Gerrit van Poelje (1884–1976), founder of Public Administration in the Netherlands
- Gerrit Pressel (born 1990), German footballer
- Gerrit Radstaak (1914–1996), Canadian politician
- Gerrit Reynst (1599–1658), Dutch merchant and art collector
- Gerrit Rietveld (1888–1964), Dutch architect
- Gerrit Roos (1898–1969), Dutch weightlifter
- Gerrit Roorda (1890–1977), Dutch communist politician
- Gerrit Rudolph (born 1988), South African-born Namibian cricketer
- Gerrit van Santen (1591/92–1656), Dutch painter and writer
- Gerrit Schimmelpenninck (1794–1863), Dutch businessman and statesman
- Gerrit Schipper (c. 1775 – c. 1832), Dutch painter
- Gerrit Schotte (born 1974), Curaçao optician
- Gerrit Schouten (1779–1839), Surinamese artist
- Gerrit Schulte (1916–1992), Dutch track bicycle racer
- Gerrit Smith (1797–1874), American abolitionist
- Gerrit Smith (composer) (1859–1912), American composer and organist
- Gerrit Smith (rugby union) (born 1988), South African rugby union player
- Gerrit van Spaan (1654–1711), Dutch writer
- Gerrit Stoeten (born 1986), Spanish footballer
- Gerrit T. Thorn (1835–1900), American politician
- Gerrit Friedrich Otto Toennies (1898-1978), research biochemist
- Gerrit van Uylenburgh (c. 1625 – 1679), Dutch painter and art-dealer
- Gerrit van der Veen (1902–1944), Dutch sculptor and member of the Dutch Resistance in WWII
- Gerrit de Veer (c. 1570 – after 1598), Dutch military officer and explorer
- Gerrit Verschuur (born 1937), South African-born American scientist
- Gerrit Viljoen (1926–2009), South African politician
- Gerrit Cornelisz Vlasman (before 1600–after 1624), Dutch brewer
- Gerrit van Voorst (1910–1986), Dutch swimmer
- Gerrit de Vries (politician) (1818–1900), Dutch jurist and politician, former Prime Minister of the Netherlands
- Gerrit de Vries (cyclist) (born 1967), road racing cyclist
- Gerrit van Wees (1913–1995), Dutch cyclist
- Gerrit de Wet (1616–1674), Dutch painter
- Gerrit Zalm (born 1952), Dutch politician
- Gerrit Zegelaar (1719–1794), Dutch painter
