= Stad Delden =

Coordinates: 52°15′0″N 6°42′0″E

Flag

Coat of arms

Stad Delden is a former municipality in the Dutch province of Overijssel. It consisted of the city of Delden. The surrounding countryside was part of Ambt Delden.

Stad Delden existed from 1818 to 2001, when it became a part of the new municipality of Hof van Twente, which covered the surrounding countryside.
