= Marie Cornélie van Wassenaer Obdam =

Dutch noblewoman and lady-in-waiting

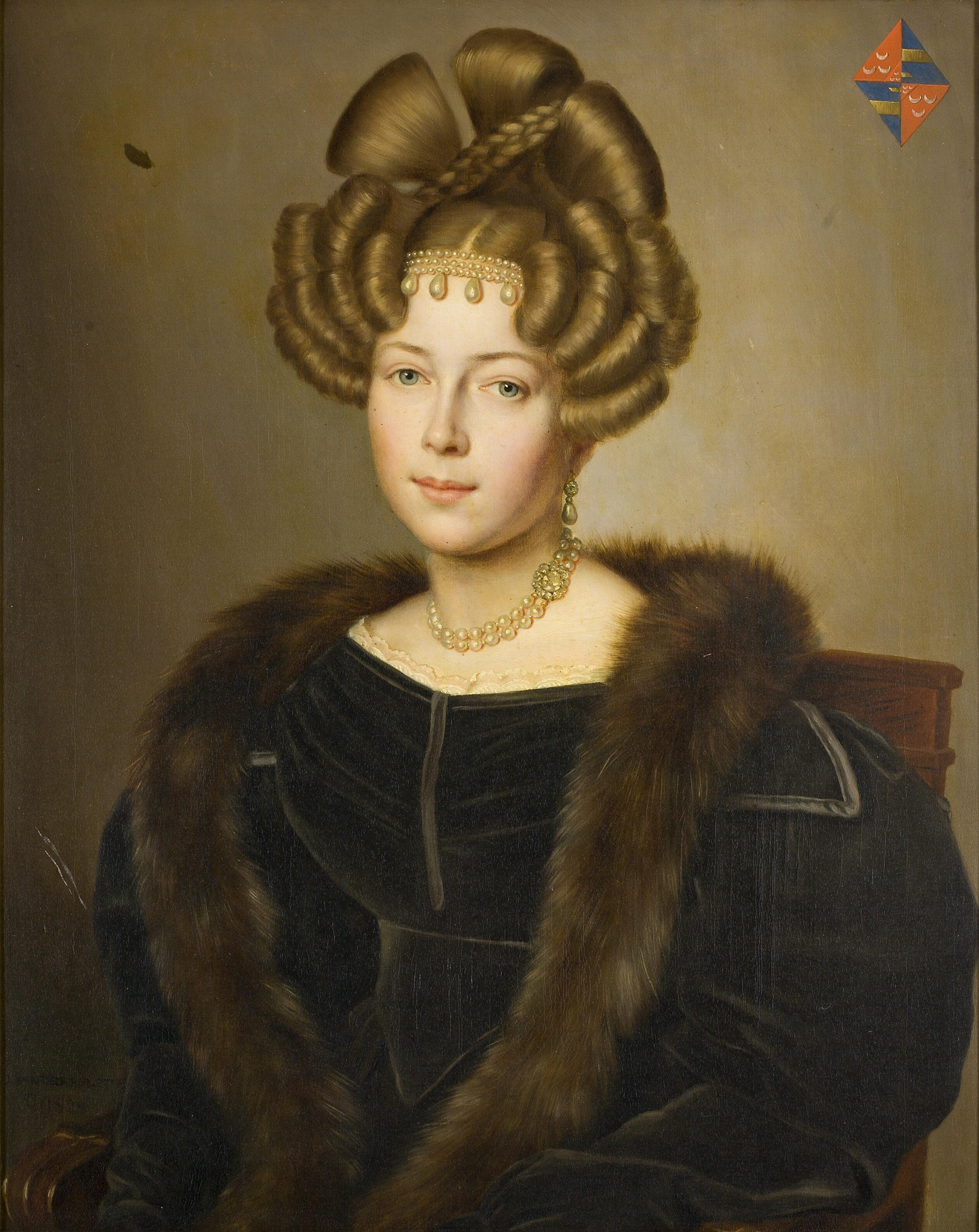
Portrait of Marie Cornélie van Wassenaer Obdam (1829) by Jean-Baptiste van der Hulst, kept at Twickel

Marie Cornélie, Countess van Wassenaer Obdam (Amsterdam, 21 September 1799 - The Hague, 31 March 1850) was a Dutch noblewoman and heiress of Twickel Castle. In 1831 she married her cousin Jacob Dirk Carel van Heeckeren van Wassenaer, through which the estate passed into the Van Heeckeren family. She also served for several years as lady-in-waiting to Princess Anna Paulowna, She died in The Hague in 1850 and was buried in Wassenaar, Her marriage remained childless.

== See also ==
- House of Wassenaer
