= Delden =

- City
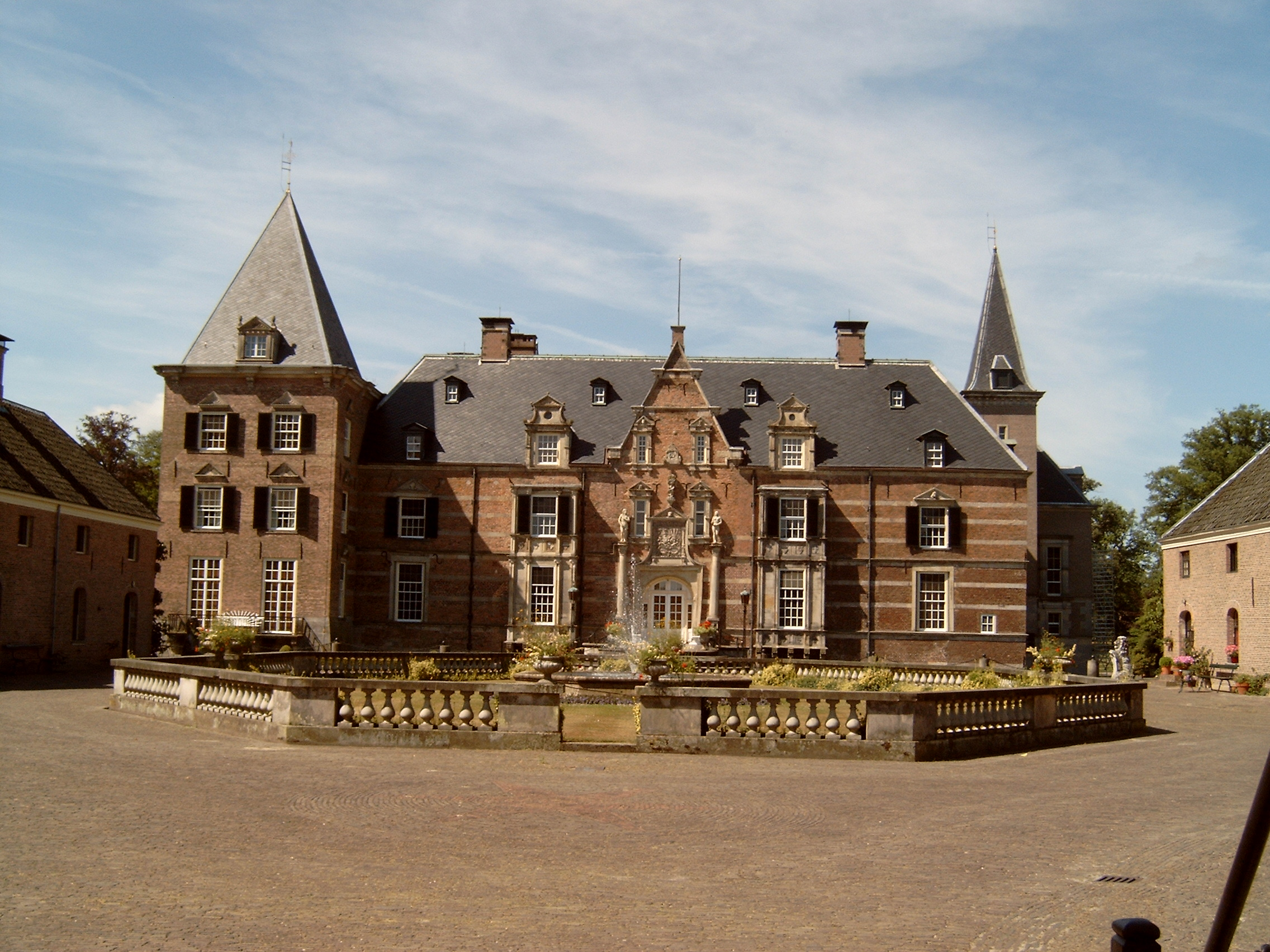
- Twickel Castle

- Flag Coat of arms

- Location in province of Overijssel in the Netherlands Delden (Netherlands)
- Coordinates: 52°15′45″N 6°42′40″E
- Country: Netherlands
- Province: Overijssel
- Municipality: Hof van Twente

Area
  - Total: 5.95 km^{2} (2.30 sq mi)
  - Land: 5.82 km^{2} (2.25 sq mi)
  - Water: 0.13 km^{2} (0.050 sq mi)
- Elevation: 20 m (66 ft)

Population (2023)
  - Total: 7,445
  - Density: 1,280/km^{2} (3,310/sq mi)
- Time zone: UTC+1 (CET)
  - Summer (DST): UTC+2 (CEST)
- Postal code: 7491
- Dialing code: 074

Delden is a city in the Dutch province of Overijssel and, since 2001, in the municipality of Hof van Twente. It received city rights in 1333. Twickel Castle is a famous landmark near Delden.

Before it became a part of Hof van Twente in 2001, Delden consisted of two municipalities: Stad Delden (the city itself), and Ambt Delden (the surrounding countryside). These municipalities had existed since 1818, when the original municipality "Delden" was divided into two parts.

== History ==
It was first mentioned in 996 as Thelden. The etymology is unclear. Around 1320, the settlement was moved to a parish church which was first mentioned in 1118. The location of the original settlement is uncertain. In 1333, it was awarded city rights, and a circular canal with ramparts was laid out around the city.

Twickel Castle was first mentioned in 1347. The oldest part of the current castle dates from 1539. Construction of the Blasius Church started around 1150, but was abandoned around 1170. In the middle of the 13th century, construction resumed, however the tower was originally intended to be much taller.

The municipality of Delden was created in 1811. In 1818, it split in Stad Delden for the city and Ambt Delden for the countryside. In 1840, the city was home to 1,169 people. The Delden railway station was constructed in 1866, and triggered a growth of the city. The Baron van Heeckeren of Twickel built a watertower in Delden. While drilling for water, the Baron's men discovered salt, which started the salt industry in the region of Twente.

The town is served by Delden railway station on the line Zutphen-Hengelo.

== See also ==
- List of rijksmonuments in Delden

== Gallery ==
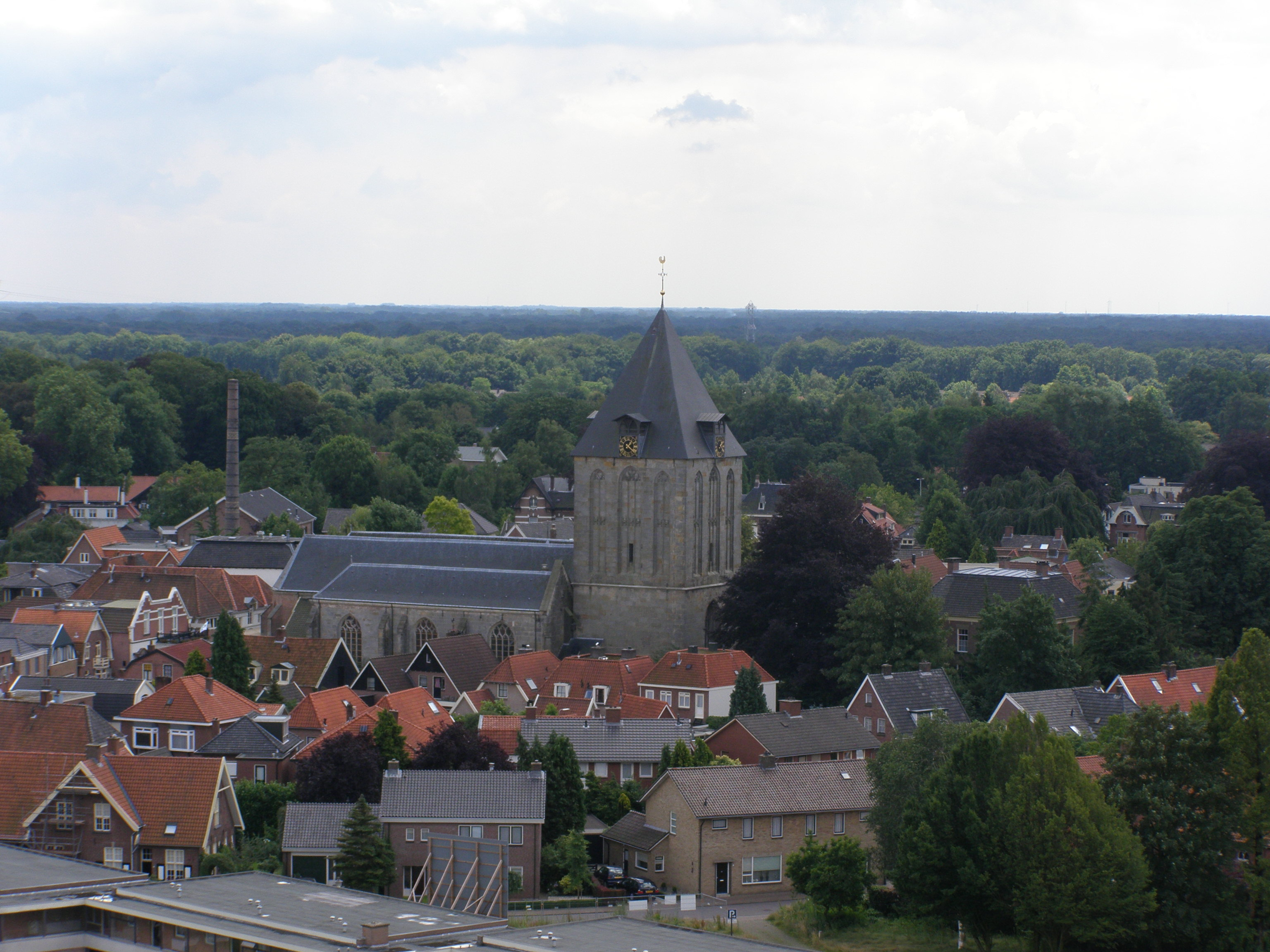
View from the water tower.

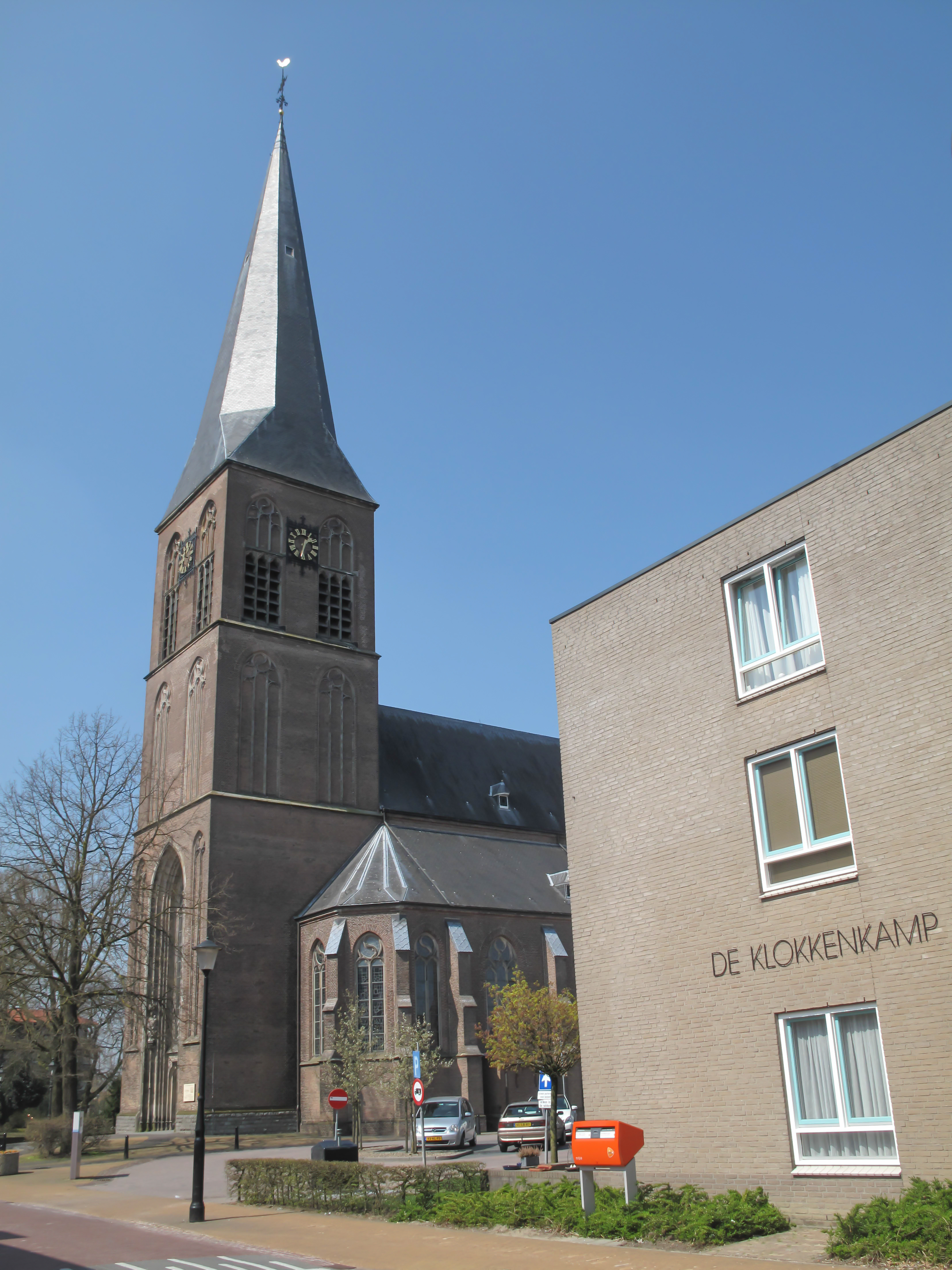
Church: the Nieuwe Blasius Church

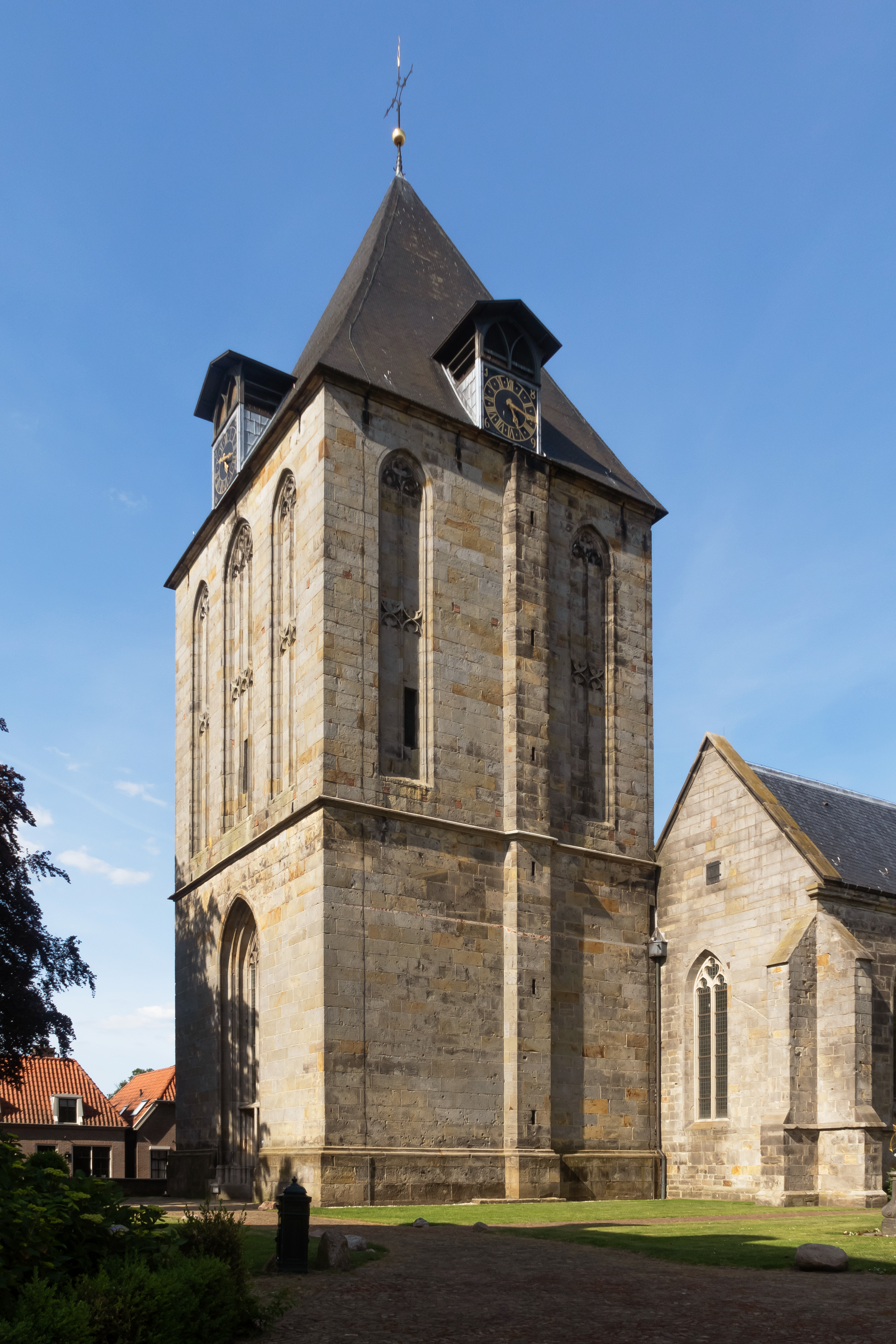
Church: the Blasius Church

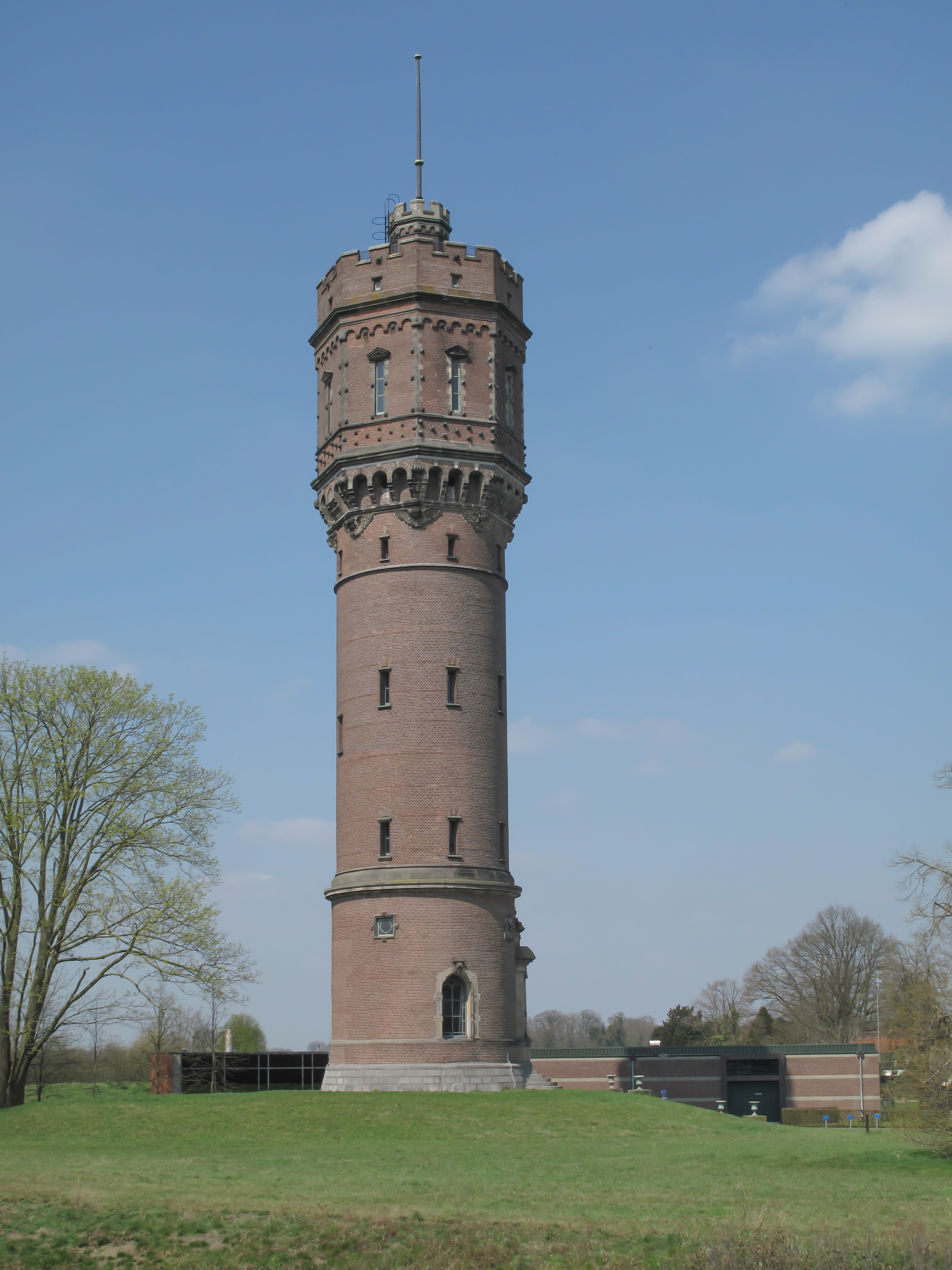
Watertower

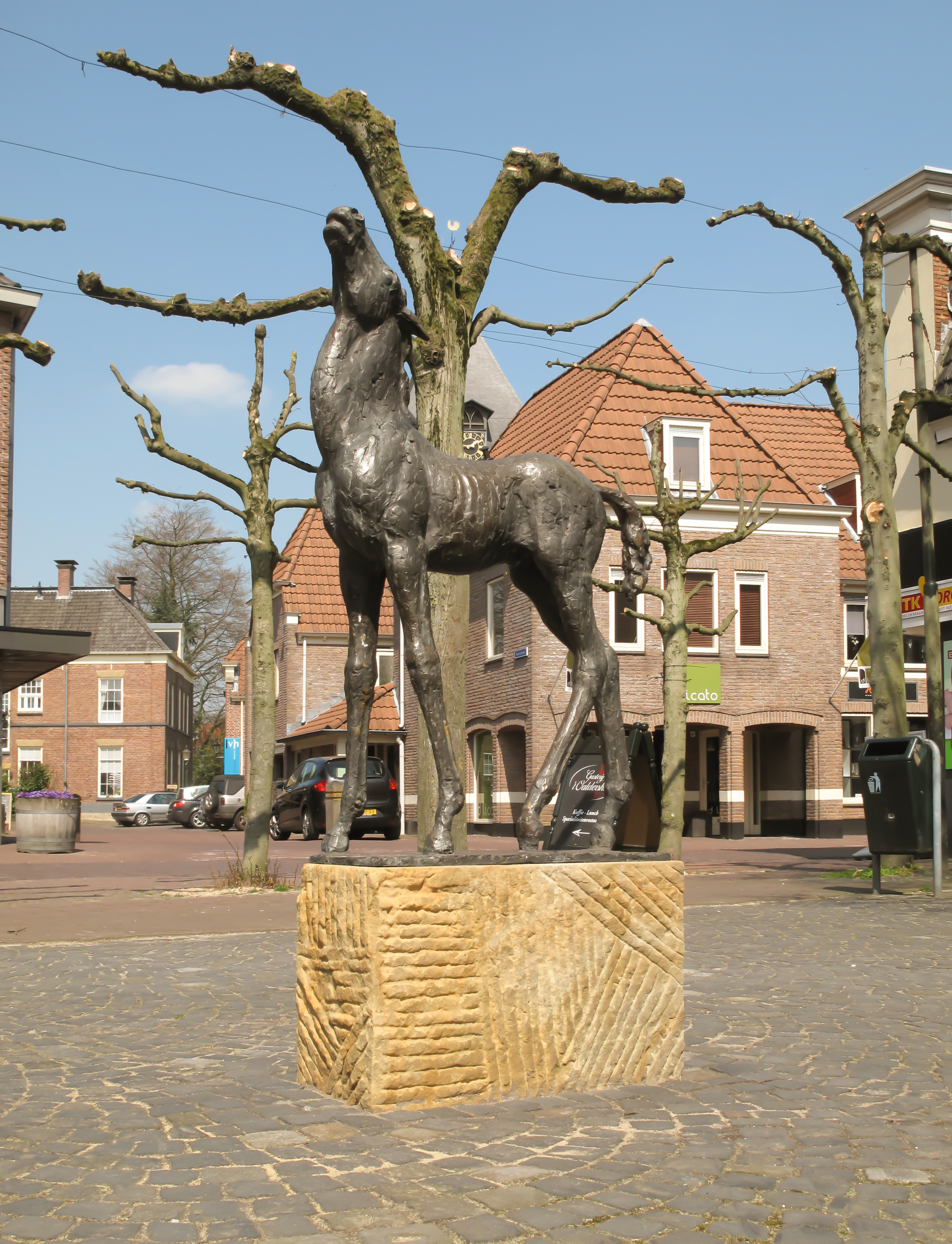
Sculpture at Keszthelyhof

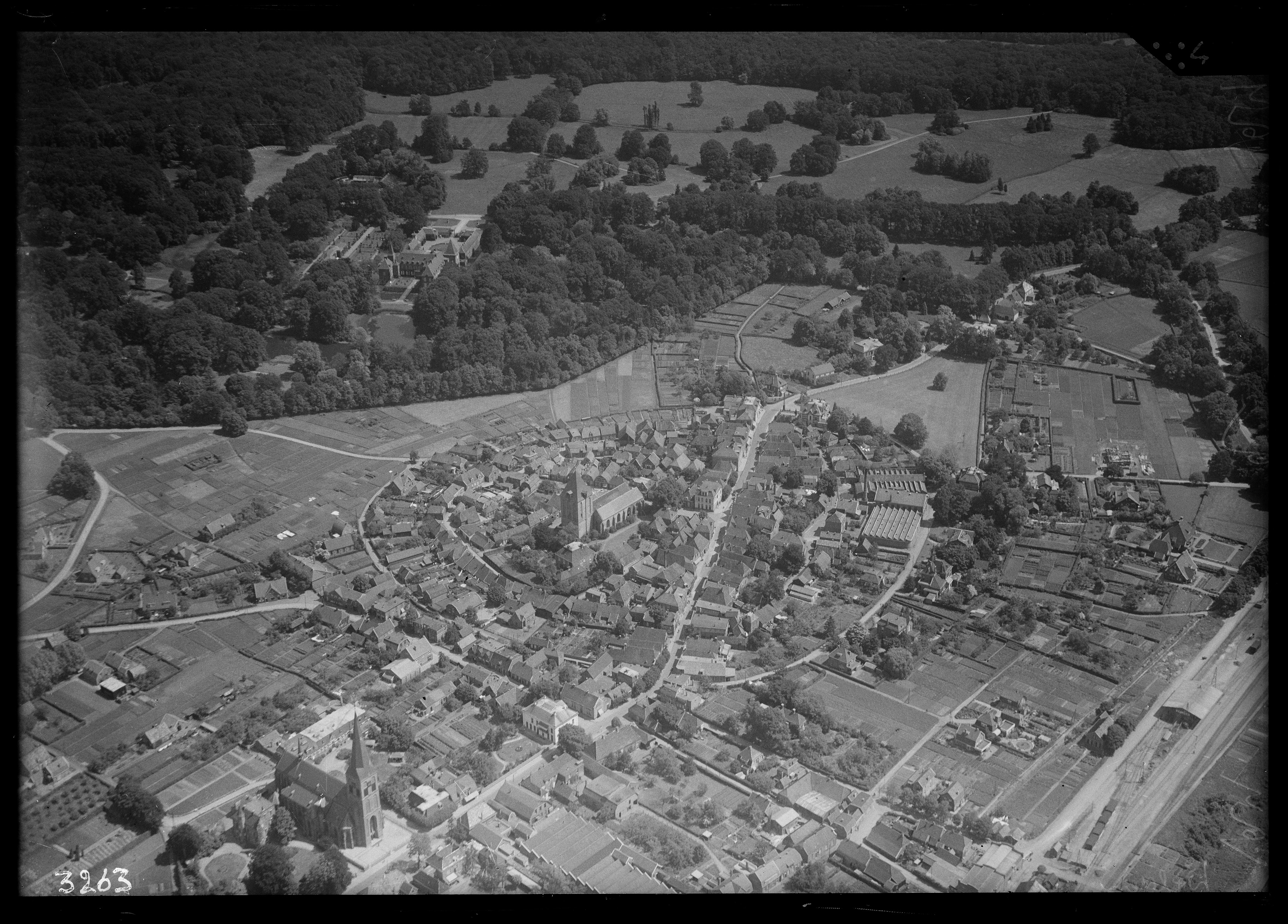
Aerial view by the Dutch Airforce, 1920-1940
