= List of individuals from the Book of Exodus =

Bible-related list

This is a Wikipedia navigation list of notable individuals from the Book of Exodus.

- Aaron
- Abihu
- Amminadab
- Amram
- Bezalel
- Eliezer
- Elisheba
- Gershom
- Hebron
- Hezron
- Hur
- Ithamar
- Izhar
- Jambres
- Jannes
- Jether
- Jethro
- Jochebed
- Joshua
- Kehath
- Miriam
- Moses
- Nadab
- Oholiab
- Puah
- Shimei
- Shiphrah
- Uri
- Zipporah
