= Benjamin Boers =

- Born: 25 September 1871; Nieuwleusen, Netherlands
- Died: 19 October 1952 (aged 81); Heemstede, Netherlands
- Education: Leiden University (theology)
- Political party: SDAP (until 1918); CPN (from 1918)
- Spouse: Maria Gerarda Gonda (m. 1897)
- Children: 3

Benjamin Boers (25 September 1871 – 19 October 1952) was a Dutch Reformed minister and communist. From 1900 to 1937, Boers served as minister in the village of Reduzum (Roordahuizen) in Friesland, where he became well-known for his radical left-wing political views, and was suspended several times by the Dutch Reformed Church for his politics.

== Biography ==
Benjamin Boers was born on 25 September 1871 to Cornelis Jacobus Boers and Maria Justiena Uhlenbrock in Nieuwleusen, where his father was a Dutch Reformed minister. After obtaining a degree in theology from Leiden University, Boers became a minister in Kedichem in 1897. That same year, he married Maria Gerarda Gonda, with whom he would have three daughters.

In 1900 Boers was transferred to the village of Reduzum, which had a liberal Reformed congregation, and was already known as a "red village" politically. Although Boers had not been very political upon his arrival in Reduzum, he quickly became known as a "stalwart proponent of social democracy and temperance". In 1904, he founded a branch of the Social Democratic Workers' Party in Reduzum. Boers was also a strong supporter of the temperance movement, founding an association dedicated to temperance in Reduzum.

Boers's promotion of his political views both in church sermons, which included performances of The Internationale, and as a private individual caused much tension in Reduzum, and Boers's local opponents accused him of splitting the village in two. One of his most prominent opponents, a wealthy farmer named Jacob Wytsma, called for Boers to be sent to an insane asylum. When Wytsma gathered 26 opponents and attempted to join Boers's congregation, a catechisation meeting with the new "converts" almost led to a public brawl after several attendees attempted to provoke Boers.

In June 1907, Boers was suspended by the Dutch Reformed Church for "un-Christian behaviour", and a second time in 1908, both for periods of three months. Boers was suspended for a year in 1910 after calling for the violent overthrow of the established order from the pulpit. In 1911, the liberal Reformed faction, which had made up the majority of congregants in Reduzum, left the local congregation. That same year, Boers and two collaborators founded cafe De Blauwe Tent in Reduzum on the road from Leeuwarden to Heerenveen, which served exclusively non-alcoholic drinks and still existed as of 2022.

Throughout the 1910s, Boers moved further leftward politically, coming into conflict with Pieter Jelles Troelstra in 1914 over the SDAP's reformism, and joining the Communist Party of the Netherlands in 1918. Boers became a staunch supporter of the Soviet Union, seeing it as a force for peace and the true manifestation of original Christianity, in contrast to the bourgeois church. He became involved with the Association of Friends of the USSR, and visited the Soviet Union together with prominent Frisian communist Gerrit Roorda in 1939.

In 1936, Boers was charged by the Dutch Reformed synod with defending the "anti-Christian" Soviet Union and "bringing slander upon the church of Christ", and was again suspended for three months. His last church service on 2 May 1937 was attended widely by mainly fellow communists. During the German invasion of the Netherlands in 1940, Boers was interned by the Dutch government, but was freed by the Germans and left unmolested during the German occupation. After World War II, Boers retreated from public politics. Benjamin Boers died on 19 October 1952 in Heemstede.
