= List of rijksmonuments in Delden =

The town of Delden has 49 listings in the register of rijksmonuments.

== List ==
Description	Original function^{?}	Built	Architect	Location	Coordinates^{?}	No.^{?}	Image
Mill complex	Craft	end of the 18th century		Zaagmolenweg 1	52°15′45″N 6°44′04″E	333099	
Sachsisch farm	Farm	1846		Brinkweg 3	52°15′20″N 6°42′18″E	34143	
Farm Spoolder	Farm	1872		Brinkweg 15	52°15′18″N 6°42′25″E	34144	
Buitenplaats	House			Hengelosestraat 5	52°15′48″N 6°42′57″E	34145	
Stewardship	Commerce and office	1726		Hengelosestraat 2	52°15′46″N 6°43′01″E	34146	
Simple one storey building	Farm	1750		Hengelosestraat 6	52°15′47″N 6°43′04″E	34147	
Het Witte Paard	Farm	1750		Hengelosestraat 8	52°15′47″N 6°43′06″E	34148	
Blasius Church	Church	1200		Kerkplein 3	52°15′47″N 6°42′42″E	34149	
Oldest rectory	House			Kerkplein 1	52°15′46″N 6°42′40″E	34150	
Tower of the Nederlands Hervormde Kerk	Church	1516		Kerkplein 3	52°15′47″N 6°42′42″E	34151	
Corner building	House	1850		Langestraat 29	52°15′45″N 6°42′44″E	34152	
House	House	first half of the 19th century		Langestraat 77	52°15′42″N 6°42′28″E	34153	
House	House			Langestraat 24-26	52°15′46″N 6°42′46″E	34154	
Corner building	House	18th/19th century		Langestraat 60	52°15′44″N 6°42′37″E	34155	
St. Blasius	Church	1872-1873		Langestraat 76	52°15′45″N 6°42′28″E	34156	
Rectory of the R.K. Kerk van de H. Blasius	Church house	1872		Langestraat 78	52°15′45″N 6°42′26″E	34157	
De Kroon	House	1764		Markt 1	52°15′46″N 6°42′43″E	34158	
One storey building	House	first half of the 19th century		Markt 2	52°15′46″N 6°42′45″E	34159	
House	House	first half of the 19th century		Markt 3	52°15′46″N 6°42′43″E	34160	
Corner building	House			Markt 5	52°15′46″N 6°42′43″E	34161	
Storage building	Storage	18th century		Meijlingstraat 3	52°15′47″N 6°42′46″E	34162	
Youngest rectory	House	first half of the 19th century		Spoorstraat 5	52°15′41″N 6°42′37″E	34163	
Farm de Strampe	Farm	18th or beginning of the 19th century		Steinwegstraat 38	52°15′25″N 6°42′50″E	34164	
Farm	Farm	1754		Vossenbrink 3	52°15′23″N 6°43′13″E	34165	
Het Oude Huis	House	1910s		Langestraat 27	52°15′45″N 6°42′45″E	507482	
One storey workshop	Industry	1910s		Kortestraat	52°15′45″N 6°42′45″E	507483	
House	House	1900		Zaagmolenweg 4	52°15′46″N 6°44′02″E	507485	
Huis	House	1900		Zaagmolenweg 6	52°15′45″N 6°44′00″E	507486	
Dubble houses	House	1916		Zaagmolenweg 3-5	52°15′43″N 6°44′04″E	507487	
St. Anne	Farm	1842		Oude Benteloseweg 32	52°15′20″N 6°42′08″E	507489	
Wooden shed	Farm	1842		Oude Benteloseweg 32	52°15′20″N 6°42′08″E	507490	Upload Photo
Entry gate to the cemetery	Cemetery	1829		Langestraat 200	52°15′42″N 6°41′27″E	507492	
Tomb of the Van Heeckeren family	Cemetery	<1929		Langestraat 200	52°15′40″N 6°41′25″E	507493	
Fencing surrounding the family grave of the Gewin family	Cemetery	1829		Langestraat 200	52°15′42″N 6°41′27″E	507494	
Municipal building/Saltmuseum	Government	1873	J. Moll	Langestraat 30	52°15′46″N 6°42′45″E	507495	
Monument	Memorial	1894		Markt bij 1	52°15′46″N 6°42′45″E	507496	
Zuiderhaghe	House	1917	Jansen en Schrakamp	Zuiderhagen 8	52°15′41″N 6°42′42″E	507497	
Manor house	House	c. 1890		Langestraat 1	52°15′47″N 6°42′52″E	507498	
House	House	1935	F.A. van Hal	Zuiderhagen 15	52°15′45″N 6°42′51″E	507499	
Cramershof	House	c. 1906		Cramerswegje 2	52°15′43″N 6°42′55″E	507500	
Bruggeman	Farm	1880		Hengelosestraat 22	52°15′44″N 6°43′32″E	507502	
Dubble houses belonging to Twickel estate	House	1925	H.A. Pothoven	Watertorenstraat 2-4	52°15′53″N 6°42′32″E	507503	
Dubble houses	House	1925	H.A. Pothoven	Watertorenstraat 1-3	52°15′54″N 6°42′32″E	507504	
Water tower in Neo-Renaissance style, belonging to Twickel estate	Public utility	1894	Hidde Petrus Nicolaas Halbertsma	Watertorenstraat bij 5	52°15′59″N 6°42′32″E	507505	
Braamrot	Farm	c. 1900		Twickelerlaan 4	52°15′56″N 6°43′07″E	507506	
Bagatelle	House	c. 1870		Van Nispenweg 2	52°15′39″N 6°42′59″E	507508	
Huis 't Eysink	Additional buildings castles etc.	1839		Hengelosestraat 24	52°15′43″N 6°43′36″E	507641	
Kronenhof	House	1923		Dr. Gewinstraat 6	52°15′40″N 6°42′52″E	507644	
Chimney of wollen fabrics factory	Industry	1866		Kortestraat 11	52°15′44″N 6°42′48″E	507947	
