= Gerrit Oosting =

Dutch politician

Burgemeester of Gieten
- In office 1987–1997

Burgemeester ad int. of Eelde
- In office 1991–1992

Burgemeester ad int. of Ambt Delden
- In office 1998–2001

Burgemeester ad int. of Vlagtwedde
- In office 2009–2009

Personal details
- Born: 12 April 1941 Zwartemeer, Netherlands
- Died: 15 November 2012 (aged 71) Oldenzaal, Netherlands

Gerrit Oosting (12 April 1941 in Zwartemeer – 15 November 2012 in Oldenzaal) was a Dutch politician.

Oosting started his career as a teacher in Oldenzaal. From 1978 to 1987 he was an alderman for the Labour Party (PvdA) in Oldenzaal. Subsequently he was mayor of Gieten from 1987 to 1997 and also mayor ad int. of Eelde from 1991 to 1992, succeedingly mayor ad int. of Ambt Delden from 1998 to 2001, and mayor ad int. of Vlagtwedde in 2009.
