= Twickel =

Castle in Delden, Overijssel

Coordinates: 52°15′59″N 06°42′54″E

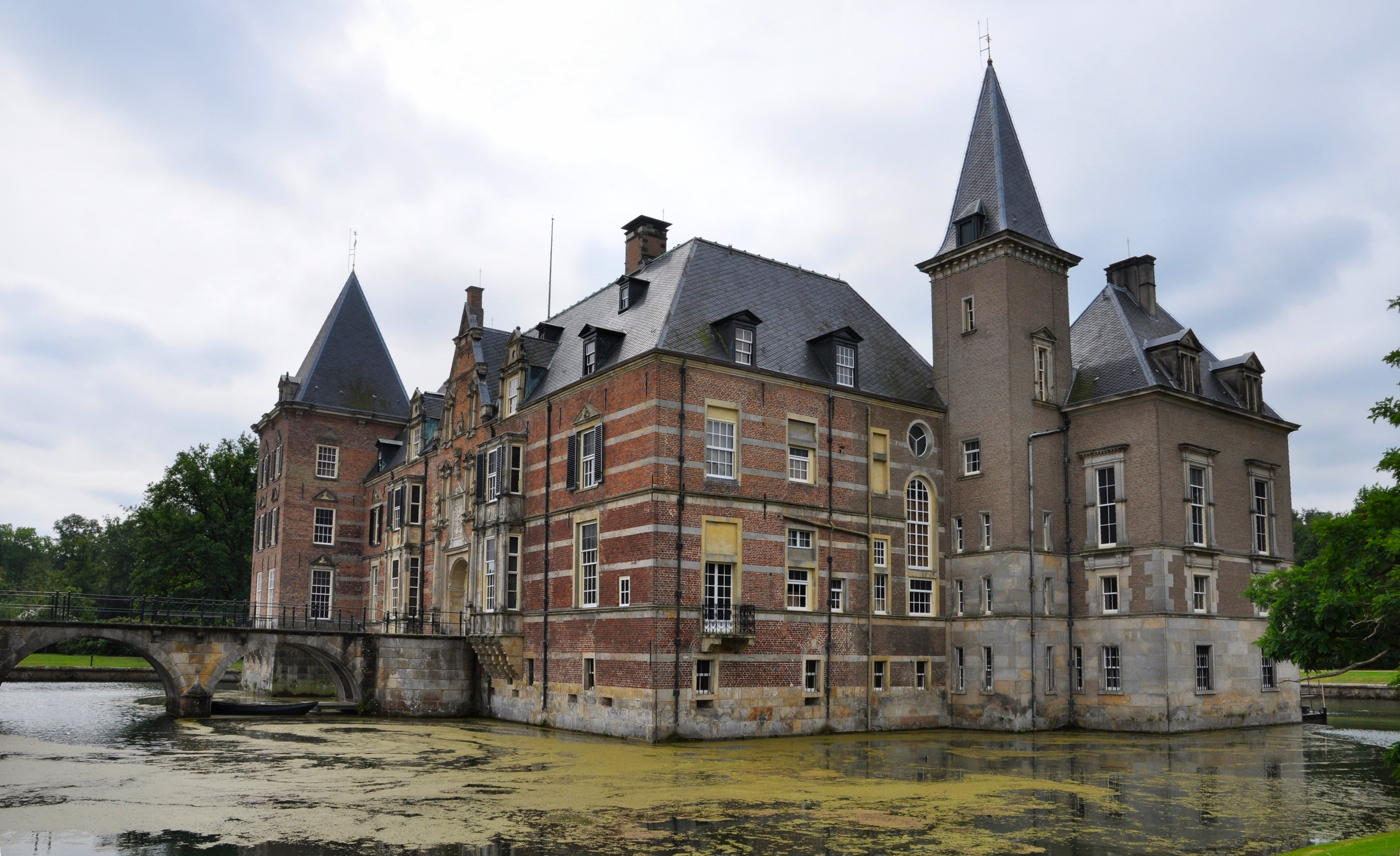
Twickel Castle seen from the garden (2013)

Twickel family coat of arms

Twickel is a protected historic country estate with 81 complex parts near Delden in the hamlet of Deldeneresch, in the municipality of Hof van Twente in the province of Overijssel in The Netherlands. The moated castle forms the center.

== History ==
The oldest mention of Twickel is in 1347, when Herman van Twickelo buys the Eysinck house near Delden. This house will later become Twickel Castle. Twickel is successively inhabited by members of the Van Twickelo family (fourteenth to sixteenth century), Van Raesfelt (sixteenth and seventeenth century), Van Wassenaer Obdam (seventeenth to eighteenth century) and Van Heeckeren van Wassenaer (nineteenth and twentieth century). The last owner has transferred Twickel to a foundation, which now still manages the assets. Until her death, the Baroness herself was chairman of the board.

The last baroness determined that after her death the castle should remain inhabited. The right of residence came to her great-nephew Christian Graf zu Castell-Rüdenhausen, who lived in the castle from 1982 until his death on January 21, 2010. Then the right of residence passed to his son Roderik Graf zu Castell-Rüdenhausen, who has lived in it from that time on.

The owners of Twickel have held various public positions, such as the position of drost of Twente. The preserved archive of Twickel therefore not only contains documents related to the castle and the residents, but also documents related to Twente's history. Because of those functions, Twickel was also regularly the stage for political negotiations and official receptions.

== Castle building history ==
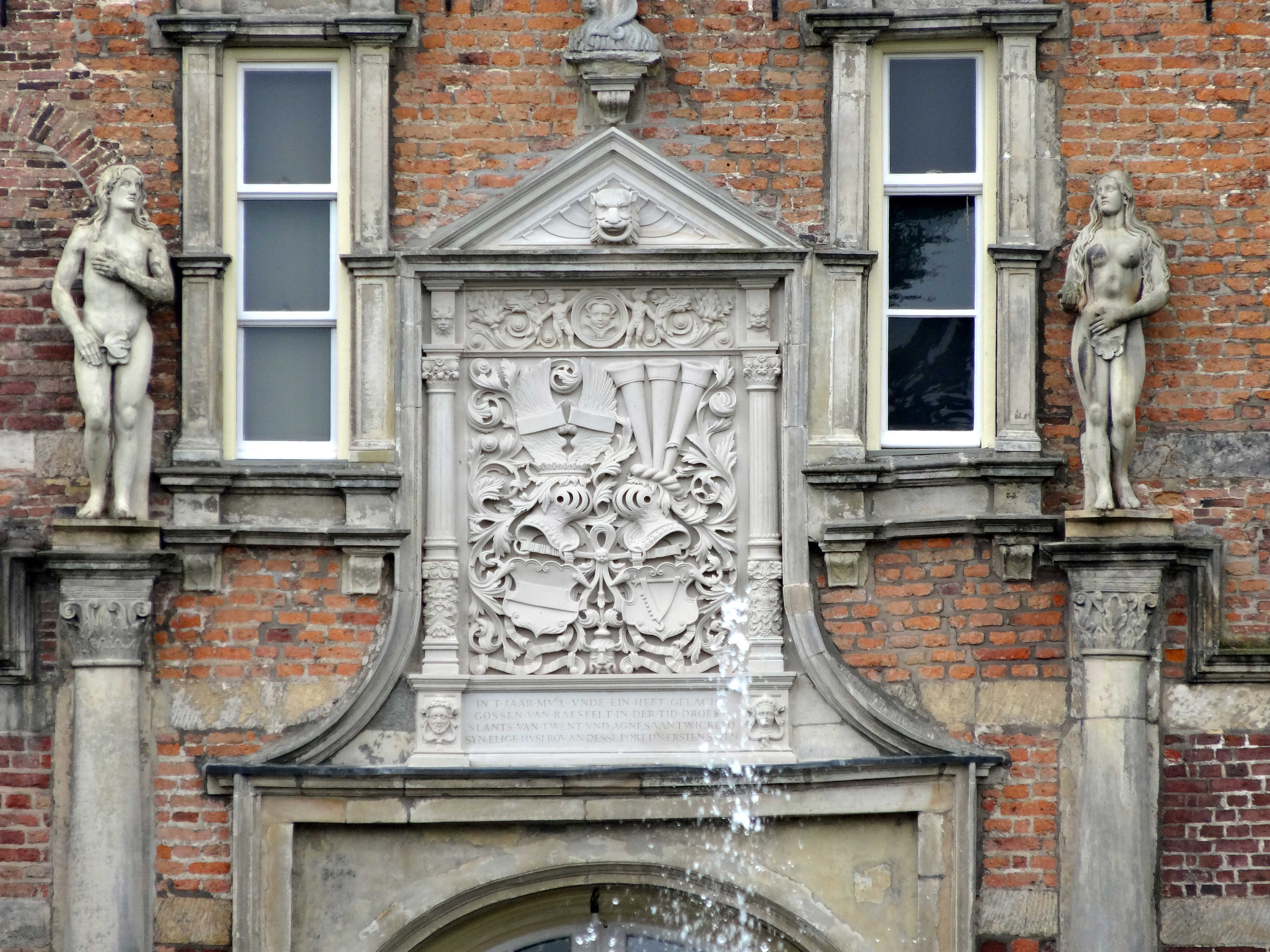
The large coat of arms with the coats of arms of Goossen van Raesfelt and Agnes van Twickelo above the entrance.

A fifteenth-century predecessor of the current castle was located in the backyard, behind the castle. Excavations of the foundations of this predecessor took place in the late 1970s. The oldest parts of the current castle date from the mid- 16th century. The entrance has a facing brick dated 1551 and is built in the early Renaissance style. Above the entrance is a large coat of arms with the coats of arms of Goossen van Raesfelt and Agnes van Twickelo, the client and wife. The stone is flanked by statues of Adam and Eve. Above the stone is the Tree of Knowledgewith the hose. The entrance is crowned by a steep gable. On either side are sandstone bay windows with coats of arms. The south tower and the part between the entrance and south tower also date from the sixteenth century. The south tower had a constricted eight-sided spire until the early eighteenth century, which was replaced in 1727 by a flat roof with a balustrade. In the nineteenth century this was replaced by the current pyramidal roof. The south wing dates from 1643. In 1692 a gallery was built parallel to the entrance wing with an imperial staircase designed by Jacobus Roman. In 1847 Jacob left Dirk Carel van Heeckeren van Wassenaer and his wife Maria Cornelia van Wassenaer Obdam expand the castle with the north tower and accompanying wing designed by the English architect Robert Hesketh. The last baron of Twickel, Rodolphe Frédéric van Heeckeren van Wassenaer, had the house restored around 1900 and fitted with modern conveniences by the English architect William Samuel Weatherley. Since then, almost nothing has changed in the castle.

== Park and gardens ==
Twickel is well known for its gardens and park. The oldest known landscaping dates back to the mid-seventeenth century. It was a garden to the south of the castle with parterres in a geometric layout around a pyramid of trellis; further there were two leafy tunnels. There were also orchards and vegetable gardens around the castle. The whole was surrounded by a hedge and the outer moat. At the beginning of the eighteenth century, a Baroque garden and ponds were created behind the castle in the ashes of the house. The vegetable garden was moved to the other side of the Twickelerlaan, south of the Kooitijk. Around 1769, a wildlife track was constructed north of the outer canal. In addition, small parts in the forest opposite the castle were builtlandscaped style. Twickel has exotic trees. The English lavender variety lavandula augustifolia Twickel, popular in modern aromatherapy, is said to have come from the gardens here. At the end of the eighteenth century, the entire baroque layout was turned into a landscaped garden. During this time, the Bergje was raised in the northeast corner of the park by digging a pond. Around 1830 the park was redesigned by Jan David Zocher. The current orangery was also built. At the end of the nineteenth century, Hugo Poortman designed the formal garden around the orangery. For the rest of the park and the Twickelerbos plans were made by Eduard Petzold. Among other things, the New Road was built that connected the Twickelerlaan with the Delden train station and the vegetable garden was moved to its current location on the corner of Twickelerlaan / Bornsestraat. The Rock Garden was created in the twentieth century by the last baroness, MAMA baroness van Heeckeren van Wassenaer née Gräfin von Aldenburg Bentinck (1879-1975). In 2008, the designs of the landscape architect Michael van Gessel are being realized. Historical buildings in the park include the orangery, the garden house, the ice house and the acorn shed.

Twickel is a member of the Dutch Association of Botanical Gardens. The collection of citrus trees is part of the Dutch National Plant Collection.

== Possessions ==
Various farms fall under Twickel, which can be recognized by the white shutters with black edges. The farm property is managed by a steward and the lease is used for the management of the estate. Some of the products produced on their own estates are sold in the estate shop.

== Twickel Foundation ==
The Twickel Foundation was established in 1953 with the aim of preserving Twickel as a nature reserve and cultural monument for hikers, nature lovers and art lovers and thus perpetuating its historical significance. Baroness Van Heeckeren van Wassenaer contributed the core assets of her properties to the foundation. This included the Twickel castle with accompanying forests and farms and the inventory. The house archives also became the property of the foundation. The remaining lands remained the private property of the baroness.

After her death in 1975, all her private estates were transferred by bequest to the Twickel Foundation.

Since 2013, part of the house has been occupied by Count Roderik zu Castell-Rüdenhausen and his family.

== Recreation ==
Buitenplaats Twickel is often visited by day trippers. The castle gardens can be visited for a fee and the vegetable gardens can be visited on Wednesdays and Fridays in the summer months. In the orangery, where the citrus trees hibernate, there is a tearoom in the summer months. The castle can be viewed under supervision during two weeks in August. The stables and coach house in the forecourt are open on Open Monument Day, as well as the De Breeriet landscape park.

The woods and fields around the castle are often used as a walking area. The European walking route E11 runs through the woods. The route is better known locally as Marskramerpad. A golf course of the Twentsche Golfclub has been located on the estate since 1997. In 2010, a 70-kilometer mountain bike route was constructed on Twickel. The route is indicated with arrows. The route follows existing dirt roads, but also specially constructed single tracks, about ten kilometers in total.

== Literature ==
- AJBrunt, ed., Inventory of the home archives of Twickel 1133–1975, Publications of the State Archives in Overijssel, no. 34 to 40, State Archives in Overijssel and Stichting Twickel, Zwolle / Delden, 1993, ISBN 90-72306-09- 0
- AJGevers, AJ Mensema, The manors in Twente and their inhabitants, State Archives in Overijssel and Uitgeverij Waanders, Zwolle, 1995, ISBN 90-400-9766-6
- Jan Haverkate, Aafke Brunt, Barbara Leyssius, Twickel inhabited and preserved, Waanders Uitgevers, Zwolle, 1993, ISBN 90-6630-426-X
- MEGB Jansen, Twickel te Ambt Delden, Contributions to the source research into the development of Dutch historical gardens, parks and country estates, National Agency for the Preservation of Monuments, Zeist, 1988
