= Gerrit Roos =

Dutch weightlifter

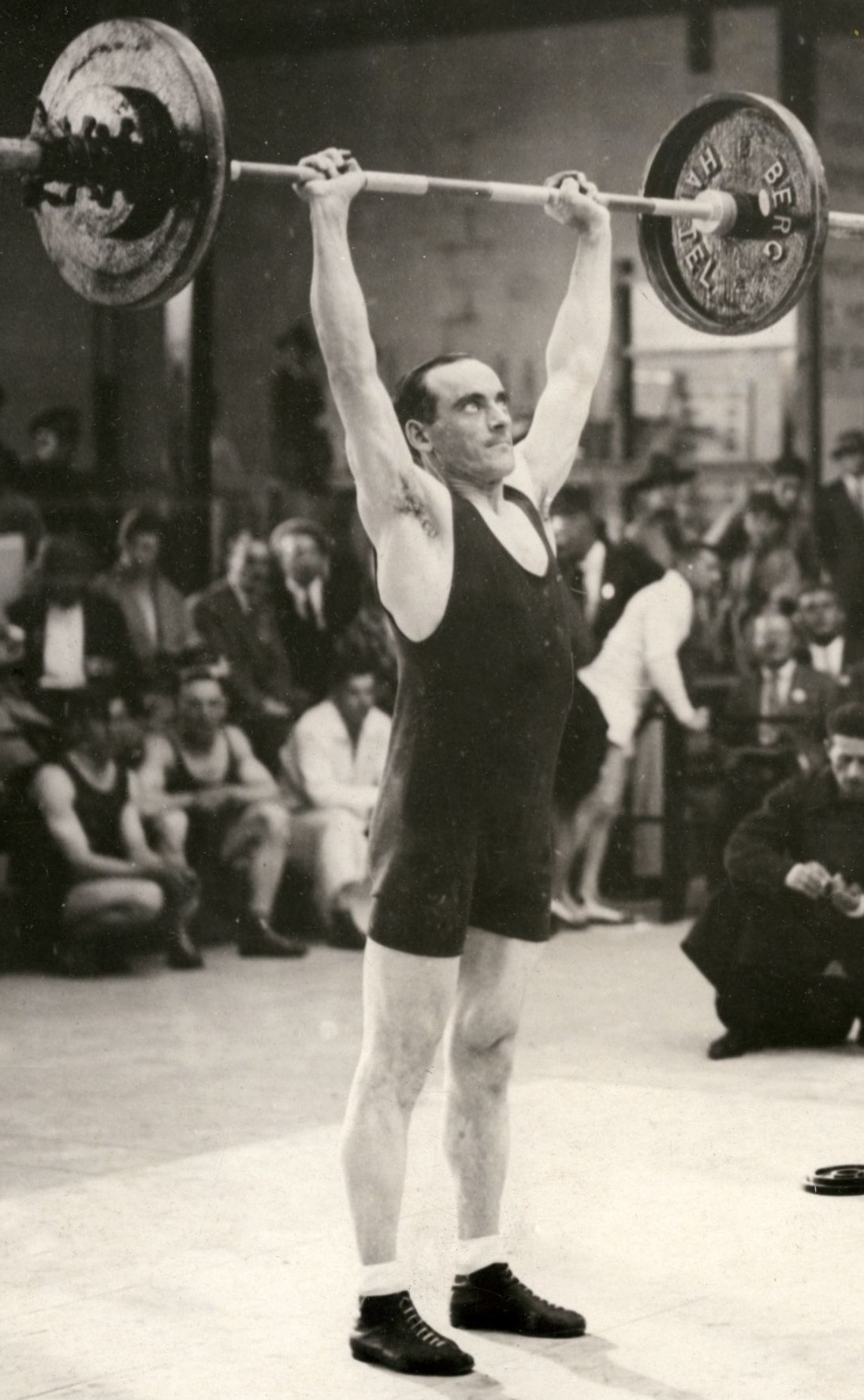
- Gerrit Roos at the 1928 Olympics

Personal information
- Born: 21 August 1898 Amsterdam, Netherlands
- Died: 10 May 1969 (aged 70) Amsterdam, Netherlands

Sport
- Sport: Weightlifting
- Club: DOK, Amsterdam

Gerrit Jacob Roos (21 August 1898 – 10 May 1969) was a Dutch weightlifter. He competed at the 1928 Summer Olympics in the lightweight category (under 67.5 kg), and finished in 14th place.
