= Gerrit Friedrich Otto Toennies =

Gerrit Friedrich Otto Toennies (January 31, 1898 – September 16, 1978) was a research biochemist. He was the oldest of five children of sociologist Ferdinand Tönnies and a brother of Jan Friedrich Tönnies.

== Life ==
Toennies was born in Hamburg, Germany, and grew up in Eutin. He was drafted into the German army in 1916 and shortly after was taken prisoner of war. As a French prisoner, he was assigned to a gas works in Le Havre, France, where he became interested in chemistry. From 1920 to 1924, he studied at universities in Freiburg, Munich and Kiel; at the latter, in 1925, he received his Ph.D. in organic chemistry. His adviser was Otto Diels who together with Kurt Alder, received the Nobel Prize in Chemistry in 1950. Toennies emigrated to the U.S. in 1926 where he joined the Texas Oil Company in Bayonne, New Jersey, until 1929. Then he became a staff member of the Philadelphia Lankenau Hospital Research Institute (LHRI), which later was called the Institute for Cancer Research. The LHRI was founded by Stanley P. Reimann and Frederick Hammett in 1927 as one of the first U.S. laboratories devoted to fundamental cancer research. The present day Fox Chase Cancer Center stems from the LHRI. Toennies was head of the Department of Microbiology from 1947 to 1963. At retirement he was awarded the honorary position “Senior Member Emeritus” by their board of trustees. Subsequently, he served as a research professor at Temple University School of Medicine from 1963 to 1968 and finally a visiting professor at the University of Göttingen and the “Biologische Bundesanstalt für Land- und Forstwirtschaft” in Braunschweig.

Toennies was married to Dita Margarete Jebens and Dorothy West. Before his death in Kensington, Prince Edward Island, he requested that his gravestone should have the words "Still Learning" placed on it. He is survived by Jan Peter Toennies and Ralf Gerrit Toennies.

== Research ==
In 1940 Toennies was the first to point out the probable biological importance of sulfonium compounds – a prediction later borne out by a variety of findings by other investigators. Later, he was the first to demonstrate that the red blood cells are a major site of bound forms of folic acids, a group of vitamins that play an important role in rapid growth of tissues such as occurs in cancer. He also made pioneering contributions to our understanding of the role of various chemicals on bacterial growth.

Over the years Toennies developed chemical procedures so precise and useful that many of them have become standards. One of them – a method of oxidizing proteins with performic acid, was adopted by the British chemist, Frederick Sanger, in his research to determine the molecular structure of insulin that won Sanger the Nobel Prize in 1958.

== Publications ==
Gerrit Toennies is the author of 114 scientific publications; those most highly cited include:

- Toennies, G. and J. J. Kolb (1951). "Techniques and Reagents for Paper Chromatography." Analytical Chemistry 23(6): 823-826.
- Toennies, G. and D. L. Gallant (1949). "The Relation between Photometric Turbidity and Bacterial Concentration (Bacterimetric Studies IV)." Growth 13(1): 7-20.
- Toennies, G. (1948). "Microbiological Assay or Bacterimetry." Science 107(2788): 598-598.
- Toennies, G. and R. P. Homiller (1942). "The Oxidation of Amino Acids by Hydrogen Peroxide in Formic Acid." Journal of the American Chemical Society 64: 3054-3056.

Toennies has also published a critical essay on the problems of modern society:

- G. Toennies "Where are we and where do we go", Dorrance, Philadelphia 1973, ISBN 0-8059-1913-9.

== U.S. Patents ==
- 1936 # 2049480 Oxidation of Cysteine and Related Compounds and process for Making Same
- 1937 # 2078592 (with T.F. Lavine) Oxidation of Cysteine and Related Compounds and process for Making Same
- 1940 # 2222993 Process of Recovering Amino Acids
- 1944 # 2349774 Acetoxy Amino Acids and Methods for their Preparation
