= Gerrit Schipper =

Dutch painter

Gerrit Schipper (baptized 13 September 1775 in Amsterdam – c. 1832 in London) was a Dutch painter specializing in pastel portraiture and miniature portrait paintings. After studying in Paris in the 1790s, he spent time in Brussels and Russia. He is believed to have arrived in the United States in 1802. He was active in New York, Charleston, Savannah, and several cities in Massachusetts. In about 1807 he moved to Canada and spent time in Quebec City and Montreal, where he produced many portraits of notable local people. He moved to England in 1810.

== Subjects ==
One of Schipper's most notable subjects was Sir Isaac Brock whom he painted a pastel portrait of whilst Brock was stationed in Upper Canada. The portrait remained in the collection of Brock until his death in 1812 and thence to his relatives. It was recently acquired by the Guernsey Museum and Art Gallery.

== Collections ==
His works are represented in the Metropolitan Museum of Art, McCord Museum, Guernsey Museum and Art Gallery and the National Gallery of Canada.
