= Gerrit Roorda =

Dutch politician (1890–1977)

Member of the Provincial Council of Friesland
- In office 1927–1941
- In office 1946–1954

Personal details
- Born: 4 September 1890 Tijnje, Netherlands
- Died: 9 February 1977 (aged 86) Tijnje, Netherlands
- Party: CPN (1919-1940); Socialist Union (1950-1956); PSP (1958-1966)
- Spouse(s): Engelina Reyne (m. 1917; died 1917) Pietertje Loopstra (m. 1923)
- Children: 1

Gerrit Roorda (4 September 1890 - 9 February 1977) was a Dutch politician and communist activist. From 1927 to 1958, he occupied various functions in Friesland and the municipality of Opsterland, for the Communist Party of the Netherlands (CPN), the Socialist Union (Netherlands) and the Pacifist Socialist Party (PSP), becoming known as one of the most well-known leftist figures in Friesland of his time.

== Early life ==
Gerrit Roorda was born on 4 September 1890 in Tijnje to Jacobus Roorda, a schoolteacher active in the local Social Democratic Workers' Party (SDAP), and Anna Jantina van Vreningen. At the age of 13, he became carpenter's apprentice, working in the Ruhr area for several years before emigrating to the United States in 1910. He settled in Sheldon, Iowa, where he operated a carpentry business with his future brother-in-law, and married Engelina Reyne in August 1917, who died several months later in a fire.

Although he remained politically inactive for most of this period, after the United States joined World War I Roorda refused to serve due to his pacifist convictions, and was arrested and subsequently assigned to the United States Coast Guard in San Francisco. He became a communist after befriending a Russian student on the train to San Francisco, and was imprisoned due to his membership of the Industrial Workers of the World (IWW).

== Political career ==
Roorda returned to the Netherlands in 1919 and joined the newly founded Communist Party of the Netherlands (CPN), becoming acquainted with several prominent party members including Lou de Visser and David Wijnkoop. He became involved in local politics and activism in Opsterland during the 1920s, leading a strike of 20,000 unemployment relief workers, and was imprisoned for two weeks after insulting the mayor of Opsterland. In 1923, he married Pietertje Loopstra, with whom he would have one daughter. He was first elected to the Provincial Council of Friesland as well as the Opsterland municipal council for the CPN in 1927. In office, he supported better conditions for the unemployed, and in 1935 proposed that the Friesland provincial council officially recognise the Soviet Union. In 1939, Roorda visited the USSR along with communist Dutch Reformed minister Benjamin Boers.

During World War II, Roorda had initially been interned by the Dutch government, but was released following the Dutch capitulation on 15 May 1940. He became involved in spreading an illegal communist newspaper, and was imprisoned by the Germans in Schoorl transit camp, being released in June 1941 after five weeks on the promise he would refrain from politics. In 1944, he was arrested again for helping people in hiding, but managed to escape from his imprisonment, going into hiding himself until the Allied liberation in April 1945.

After the war, Roorda returned to local politics for the CPN. In 1946, the CPN under his leadership became the largest party in Opsterland, and Roorda became an alderman and for a time the deputy mayor of Opsterland, and was re-elected to the Provincial Council of Friesland as well. Roorda had already been known as a relatively independent-minded party member prior to World War II, but his conflicts with the CPN leadership escalated due to his opposition to a 1945 attempt by Paul de Groot to merge the CPN into a broader progressive people's party and the expulsion of Roestam Effendi.

In 1949, Roorda was first denied the right to speak by the CPN political group in the Friesland provincial council and then intentionally placed on an unelectable part of the CPN party list to ensure his electoral defeat. After the local communist party in Opsterland formed an independent faction led by Roorda in response, he was then expelled from the CPN, being publicly condemned in De Waarheid, the CPN's party newspaper, as "a real petit-bourgeois" and a "reactionary Frisian chauvinist".

Roorda nevertheless remained highly popular in Opsterland, and when he joined the Socialist Union (SU) in 1950 he was able to leverage his local popularity to earn the SU a seat in the Friesland provincial council. He left the party in 1956 after it condemned the Soviet invasion of Hungary, but after the SU's dissolving followed most of its members into the Pacifist Socialist Party (PSP), which he would remain a member of until 1966. He left the provincial council of Friesland in 1954, and the Opsterland municipal council in 1958.

== Later life ==
After leaving politics, Roorda remained active as an independent communist activist. In 1966, at the age of 75, he participated in a 30 kilometer march to protest American involvement in the Vietnam War, and remained a prominent opponent of the war throughout the 1960s and 1970s. Roorda remained a staunch supporter of the Warsaw Pact, labeling it "the steel tip of the world revolution" and publicly supporting the 1968 Warsaw Pact invasion of Czechoslovakia. He also helped lead an umbrella organisation supporting Frisian theatre.

Gerrit Roorda died on 9 February 1977 in Tijnje.

== Bibliography ==
- Stutje, Jan Willem (2000). De man die de weg wees: leven en werk van Paul de Groot 1899-1986. Amsterdam: Bezige Bij. ISBN 978-90-234-3908-0.
