= Gerrit Forbes =

American judge

Justice of the New York Supreme Court
- In office 1888 – September 22, 1906

District Attorney for Madison County, New York
- In office January 1871 – December 1874

Personal details
- Born: Gerrit Angelo Forbes; May 30, 1836
- Died: September 22, 1906 (aged 70)
- Profession: Judge

Gerrit Angelo Forbes (May 30, 1836 – September 22, 1906) was a justice of the Supreme Court of New York beginning in 1888. He served as District Attorney for Madison County from January 1871 to December 1874. He was a member of the Madison County and State Bar Associations. Forbes was serving his second term on the Supreme Court at the time of his death.
