= Gerrit Schouten =

Surinamese artist (1779–1839)

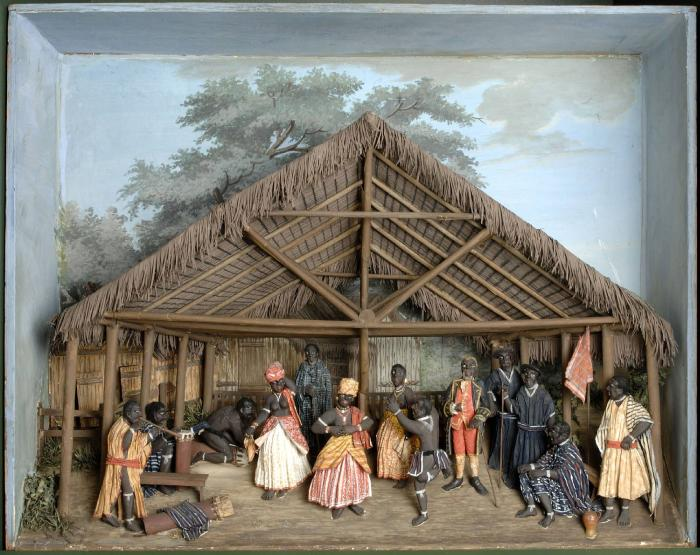
One of Schouten's dioramas.

Gerrit Schouten (16 January 1779 – 28 January 1839) was a Surinamese artist, who was known for his painted papier-maché dioramas of Surinamese life.

Schouten was born in Paramaribo, the capital of Surinam, then a Dutch colony. The son of Hendrik Schouten, a Dutch government clerk, and Suzanna Hanssen, a free black woman, he was an autodidact and taught himself how to paint. Schouten was the first Creole working as a professional artist. Many of his dioramas depict dus, dance parties practiced by the black enslaved populations in Suriname. These performances, conducted in the Surinamese creole language Sranan Tongo enabled the groups to exchange information and criticize the colonial regime that enslaved them.

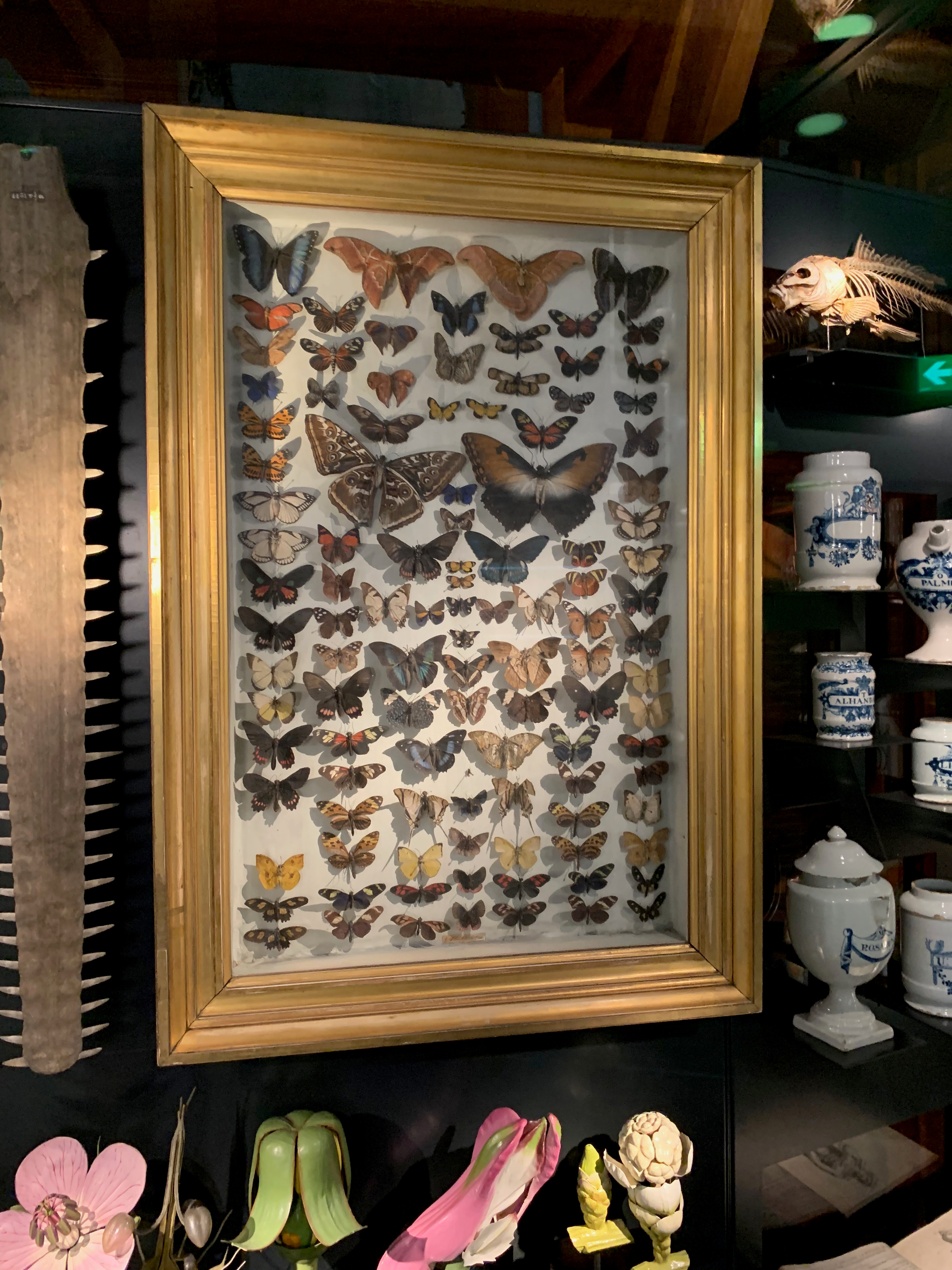
Papier-mâché butterflies given by Schouten to Prince Henry of the Netherlands, now in the Rijksmuseum Boerhaave, Leiden.

In 1835, he offered a case of papier-mâché butterflies to Prince Henry of the Netherlands during his visit to Suriname. Later he was awarded a gold medal by the House of Orange for his artwork.

== Literature ==
- Medendorp, Clazien (1999). Gerrit Schouten (1779–1839): botanische tekeningen en diorama's uit Suriname. Amsterdam: KIT Publishers. ISBN 9068322796.
- Medendorp, Clazien (2008). Kijkkasten uit Suriname: de diorama's van Gerrit Schouten. Amsterdam: KIT Publishers. ISBN 978-9068327908.
- Rinehart, Nicholas (2023). Essence of Stillness: Temporality and Materiality in the Dioramas of Gerrit Schouten. Chicago: University of Chicago Press.
