= The Departure of the Israelites =

Painting by David Roberts

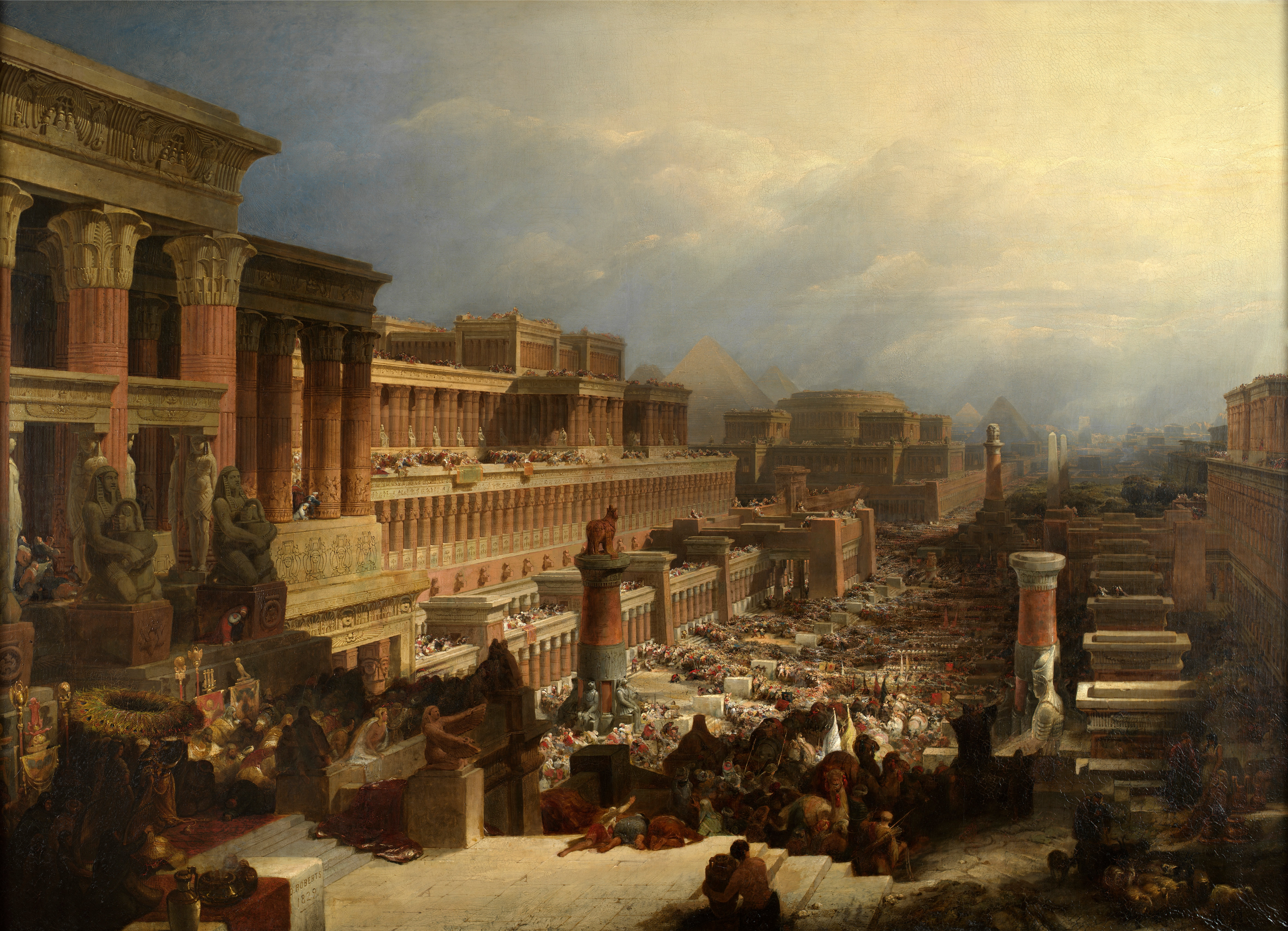
- Artist: David Roberts
- Year: 1829
- Type: Oil on canvas, history painting
- Dimensions: 119 cm × 212 cm (47 in × 83 in)
- Location: Birmingham Museum and Art Gallery; Birmingham

The Departure of the Israelites is an oil on canvas historical landscape painting by the British artist David Roberts, from 1829. It is held at the Birmingham Museum and Art Gallery.

== History and description ==
It depicts a scene from the biblical story of The Exodus. Moses, having secured the release of the enslaved Israelites, through the ten Plagues of Egypt, prepares to lead them to freedom as they depart Ancient Egypt for their Crossing of the Red Sea. The scene takes place in an exotic scenery dominated by Ancient Egyptian buildings, with some sculptures also visible, where the human presence seems dwarfed.

The painting was commissioned by the art collector Lord Northwick and was displayed at the Suffolk Street Gallery in London during the annual exhibition of the Society of British Artists. It represented a major breakthrough work for Roberts and was reproduced as an engraving. Roberts was a noted scenic designer for the West End stage. He later became known for his tours of Spain and Italy and particularly the Middle East where he recorded the surviving architecture from the Classical era.

Today the painting is in the collection of the Birmingham Museum and Art Gallery, having been acquired in 1986.

== Bibliography ==
- Burritt, Amanda M. Visualising Britain’s Holy Land in the Nineteenth Century. Springer Nature, 2020.
- Mancoff, Debra N. David Roberts: Travels in Egypt & the Holy Land. Pomegranate, 1999.
- Parry, Jonathan. Promised Lands: The British and the Ottoman Middle East. Princeton University Press, 2024.
- Sim, Katherine. David Roberts R.A., 1796–1864: A Biography. Quartet Books, 1984.
- Wright, Christopher, Gordon, Catherine May & Smith, Mary Peskett. British and Irish Paintings in Public Collections: An Index of British and Irish Oil Paintings by Artists Born Before 1870 in Public and Institutional Collections in the United Kingdom and Ireland. Yale University Press, 2006.
