= Gerrit de Wet =

Dutch painter

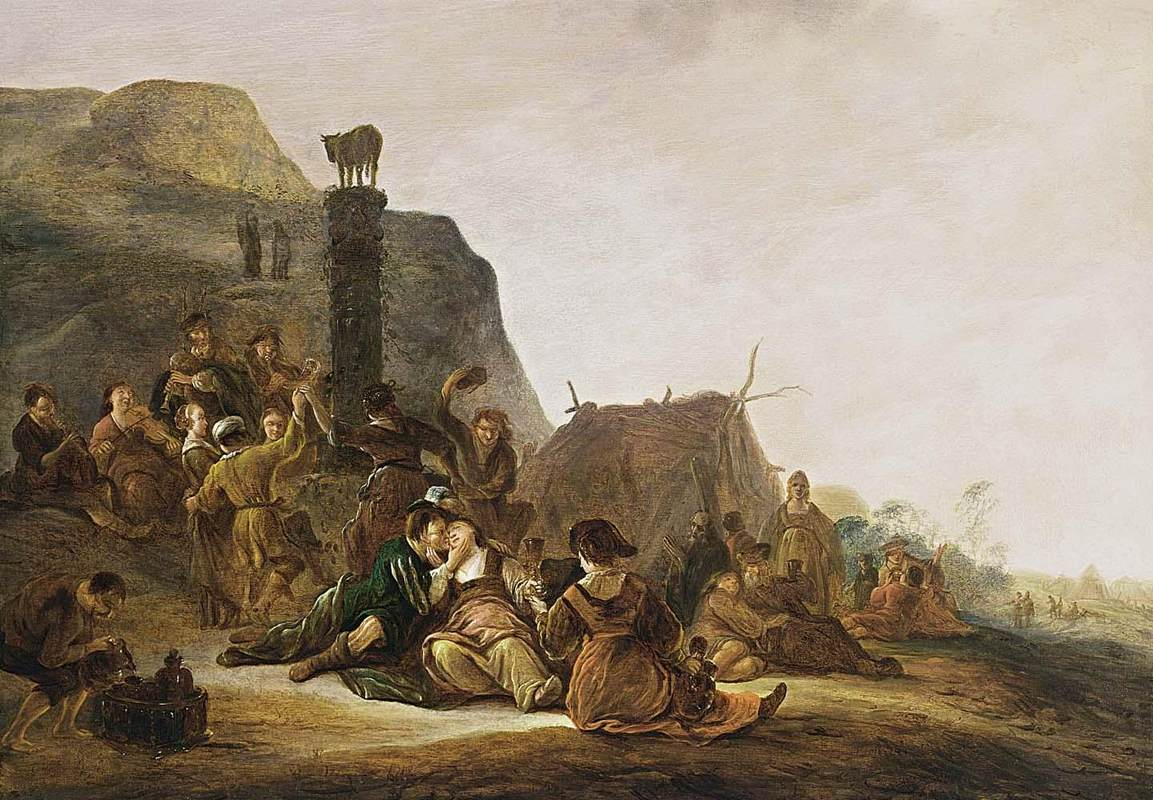
The Adoration of the Golden Calf

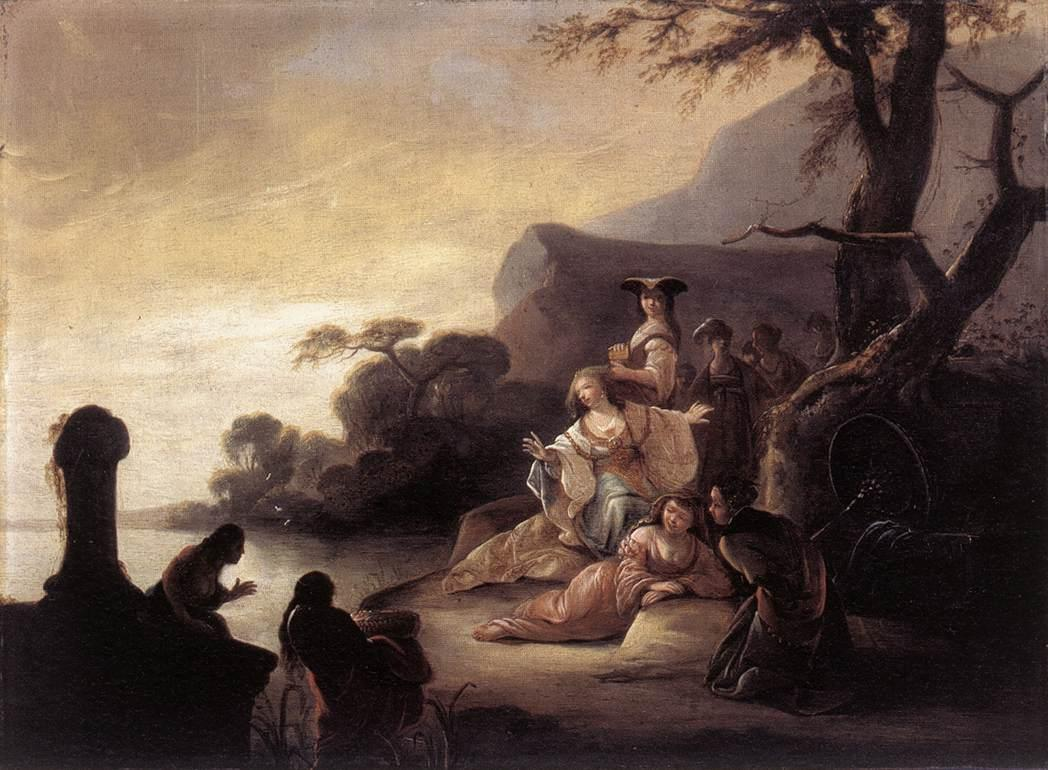
Finding of Moses in the Nile, 1650, now in the Ons' Lieve Heer op Solder museum

Gerrit de Wet (1616, Amsterdam? – 1674, Leiden), sometimes called De Wett, Düwett, De Weth, or De Weet, was a Dutch painter.

He was a scholar of Rembrandt, whose manner he imitated; he also painted landscapes, and was accounted a good colourist. From 1643 to 1662 he was active in Haarlem. The Copenhagen Gallery has his painting Jephthah's Daughter.
