= Nijenhuis =

Nijenhuis may refer to:

- Nijenhuis (Diepenheim) - a castle near Diepenheim, the Netherlands
- Nijenhuis (Olst-Wijhe) - a castle near Olst-Wijhe, the Netherlands
- Nijenhuis (surname) - a Dutch toponymic surname
