= Maria van Beckum =

Dutch noblewoman and Anabaptist burned at the stake for heresy

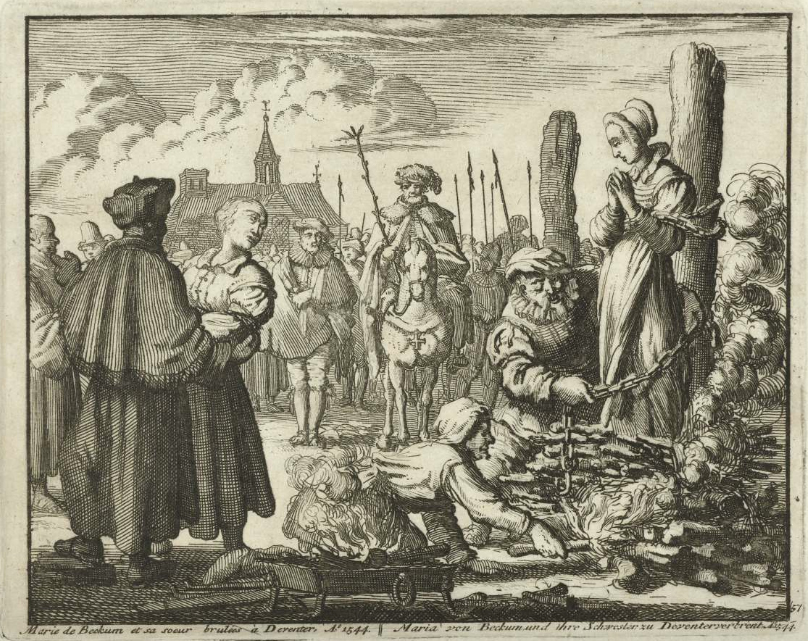
Maria van Beckum being chained to the stake, by Jan Luiken

Maria van Beckum (before 1510 – 13 November 1544) was a Dutch noblewoman and Anabaptist executed for heresy.

Maria was born in Markelo as the daughter of Johan II van Beckum (d. 1526) and Johanna van Wrede (died before 1511). She was the sister of Johan III van Beckum. After their father's brother died, they moved to Nijenhuis in Diepenheim. When their mother died, their father remarried Beatrix van de Hoeve, who threw Maria out of the house for becoming a follower of David Joris. In 1542, the Anabaptists were declared heretics in the Netherlands, and some time after that Maria was taken in by her brother. Maria was arrested 31 May 1544 on the orders of Goesen van Raesveldt, the bailiff of Twente, who was a relative and was next in line as the heir of Nijenhuis because Jan and Ursula van Beckum were childless. Her sister-in-law Ursula accompanied her out of sympathy. Both women were sentenced to death by burning. Their case attracted a lot of attention and Maria is remembered in the Martyr's Mirror by Thieleman J. van Braght.
