= Nijenhuis (Diepenheim) =

Castle and an estate in The Netherlands

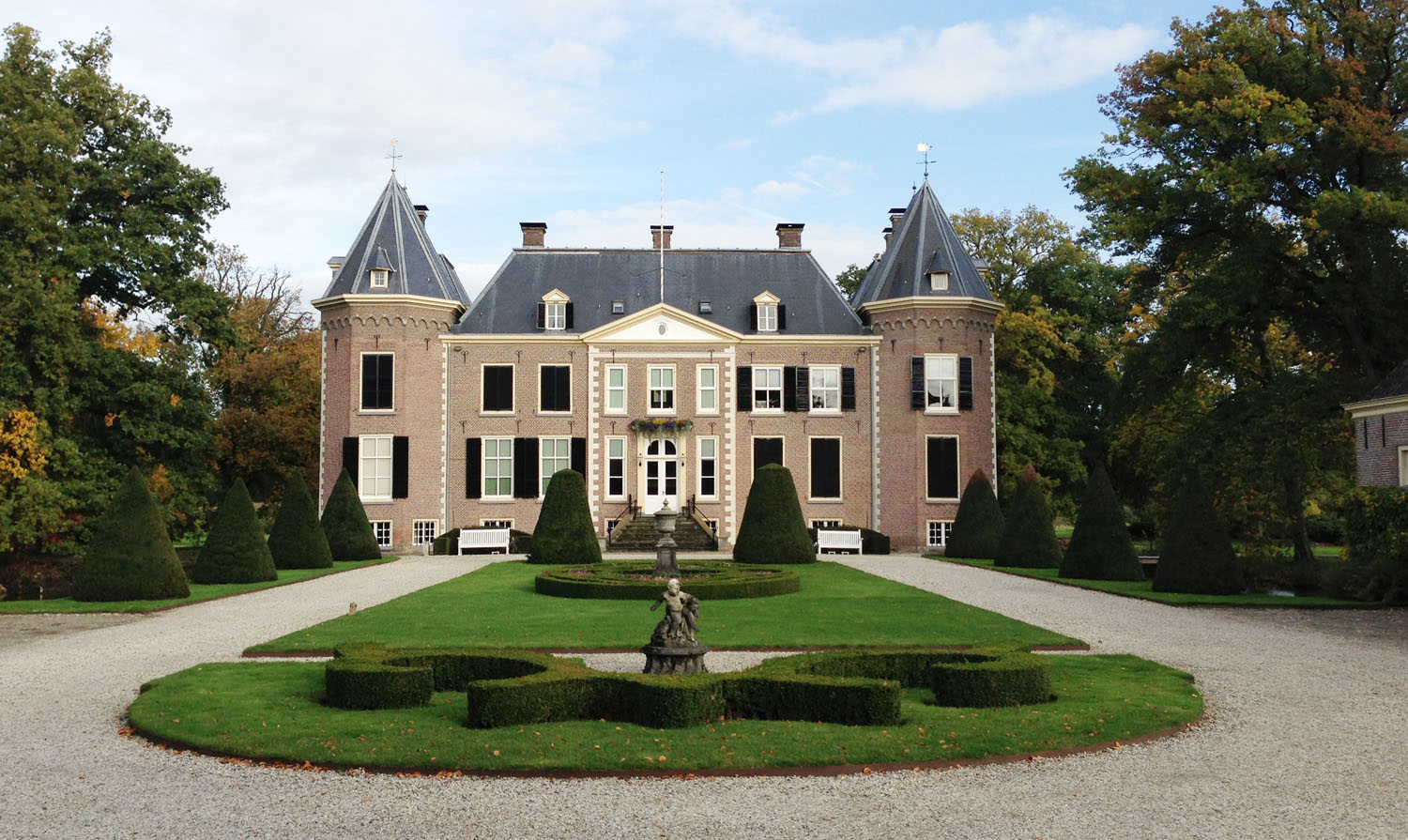
- Huis Nijenhuis near Diepenheim
- Interactive map of the Nijenhuis area

General information
- Status: Rijksmonument
- Location: Diepenheim
- Coordinates: 52°12′12″N 6°34′27″E

Website
- www.nijenhuisenwesterflier.nl

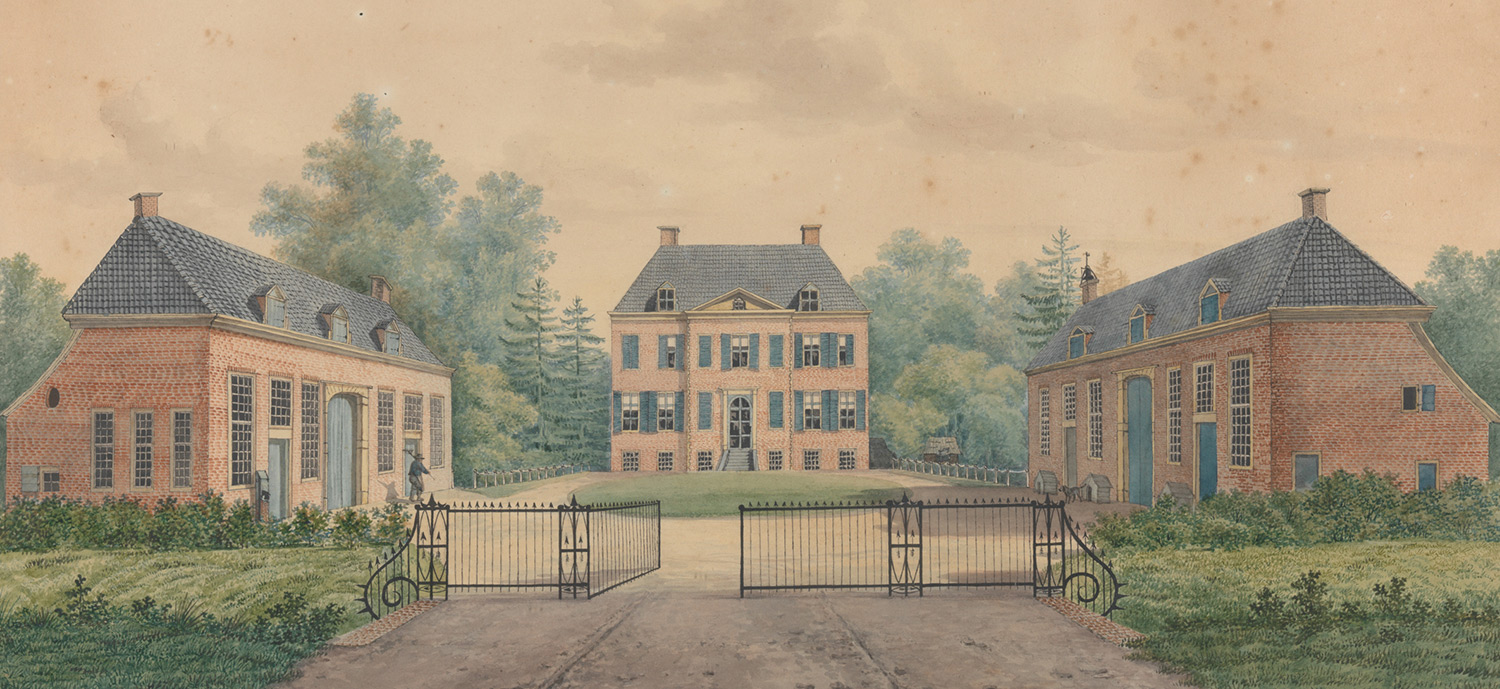
H. M. van Eck: Overview of Nijenhuis, watercolor, 1827.

Nijenhuis is a castle and an estate near Diepenheim in the municipality Hof van Twente, Netherlands (province Overijssel).

== History ==
The Nijenhuis is first mentioned around 1380 in a list of vassals of the Bishop of Utrecht. Arend Sticke was then a vassal. In the middle of the fifteenth century it came into the hands of the Van Beckum family through inheritance. Well-known owners were Johan van Beckum and his wife Ursula van Werdum who, like Johan's sister Maria van Beckum, was burned alive in 1544 as an heretic anabaptist in Delden. Johan van Beckum remarried, but transferred the Nijenhuis to his sister Adriana and her husband Gerrit Swaefken. Swane Swaefken, daughter of Gerrit, married Roelof van Hövell. After the death of the last Van Hövell in 1788, the manor house passed to A.C.J. van Westerholt who gave it to Mr. Willem Cornelis Boers in 1791.

=== The Schimmelpenninck family ===
Boers sold the Nijenhuis in 1799 to the wine merchant Gerrit Schimmelpenninck, who bought it for his son Rutger Jan Schimmelpenninck (1761-1825). From 1805 to 1806 he was Grand pensionary was of the Batavian Republic. Since then, the Nijenhuis has remained in the possession of the Schimmelpennincks. Other well-known members of the family are Gerrit Schimmelpenninck (1794-1863), Rutger Jan Schimmelpenninck van Nijenhuis (1821-1893) and Sander Schimmelpenninck (born 1984).

== Building ==
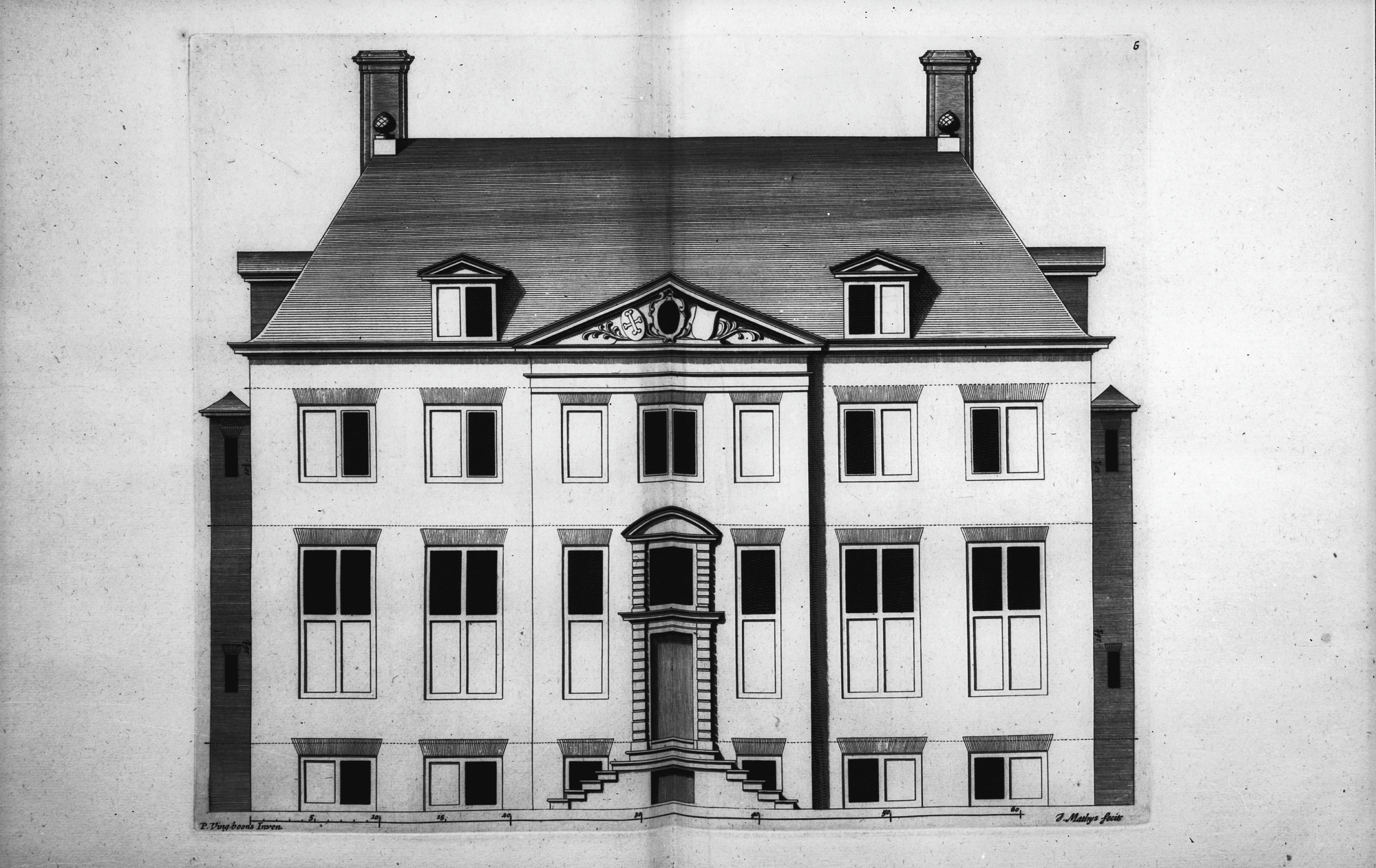
Former mansion at the entry of the driveway to Nijenhuis. Philip Vingboons's design of the front of the original Huis Peckedam, Goorsestraat 30, Diepenheim, the Netherlands, demolished in 1826. The new building (not shown) was erected in 1898. Dutch Rijksmonument number 527017.

Philips Vingboons designed the central part of Nijenhuis, a Dutch neoclassicistic mansion built around 1662. Abraham Martinus Sorg, town architect of Kampen, Overijssel modernised the building from 1791 to 1794. To the front two polygonal towers were added by Gerrit Schimmelpenninck in 1858 and two rectangular wings at the rear by Lodewijk Hieronymus Schimmelpenninck in 1914-1915. The manor has remained largely intact with sheds, a workshop, a vegetable garden with orangery, a park with a tea house and an ice cellar.

== Gallery ==
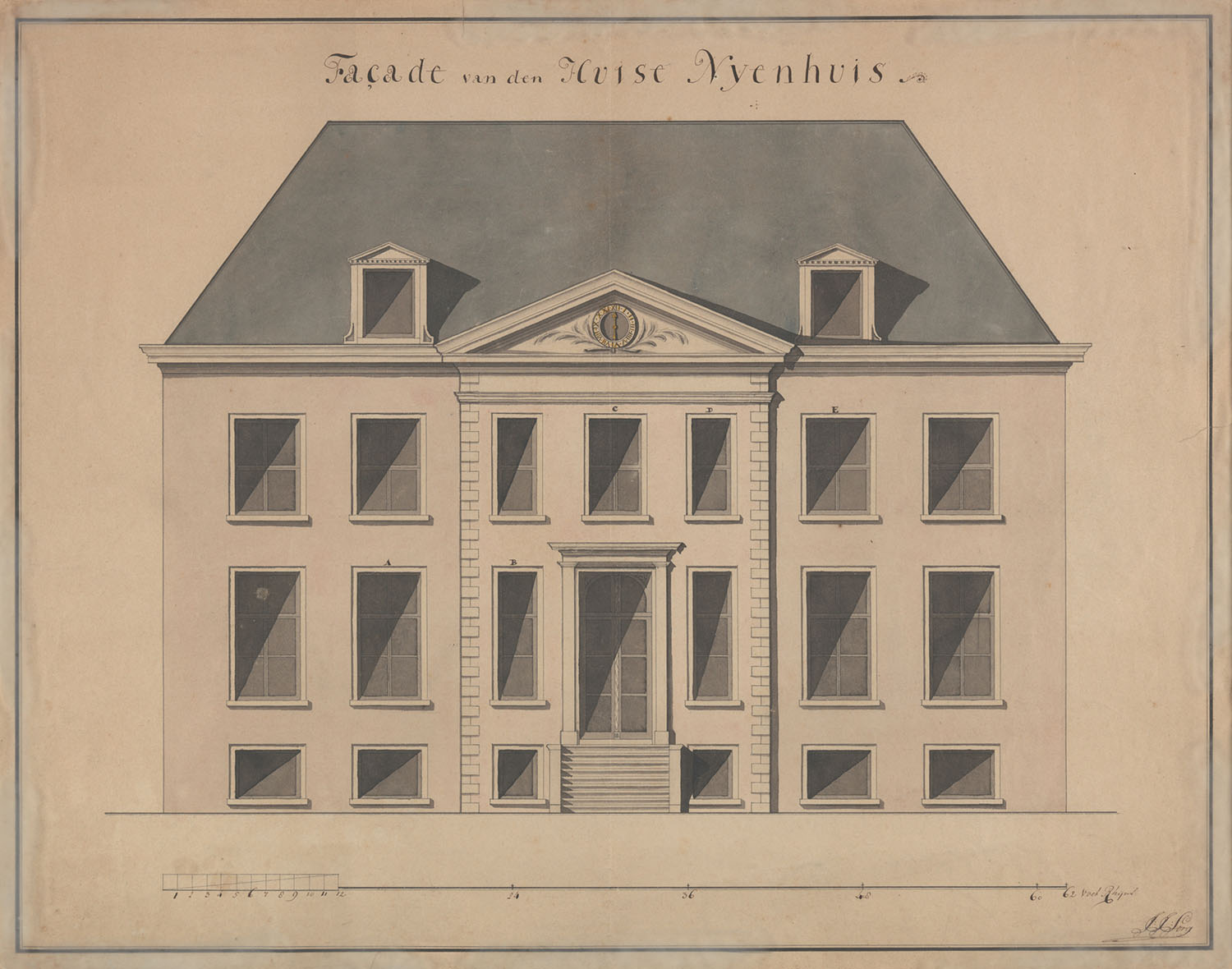
Design for a renovation of Nijenhuis, around 1770.

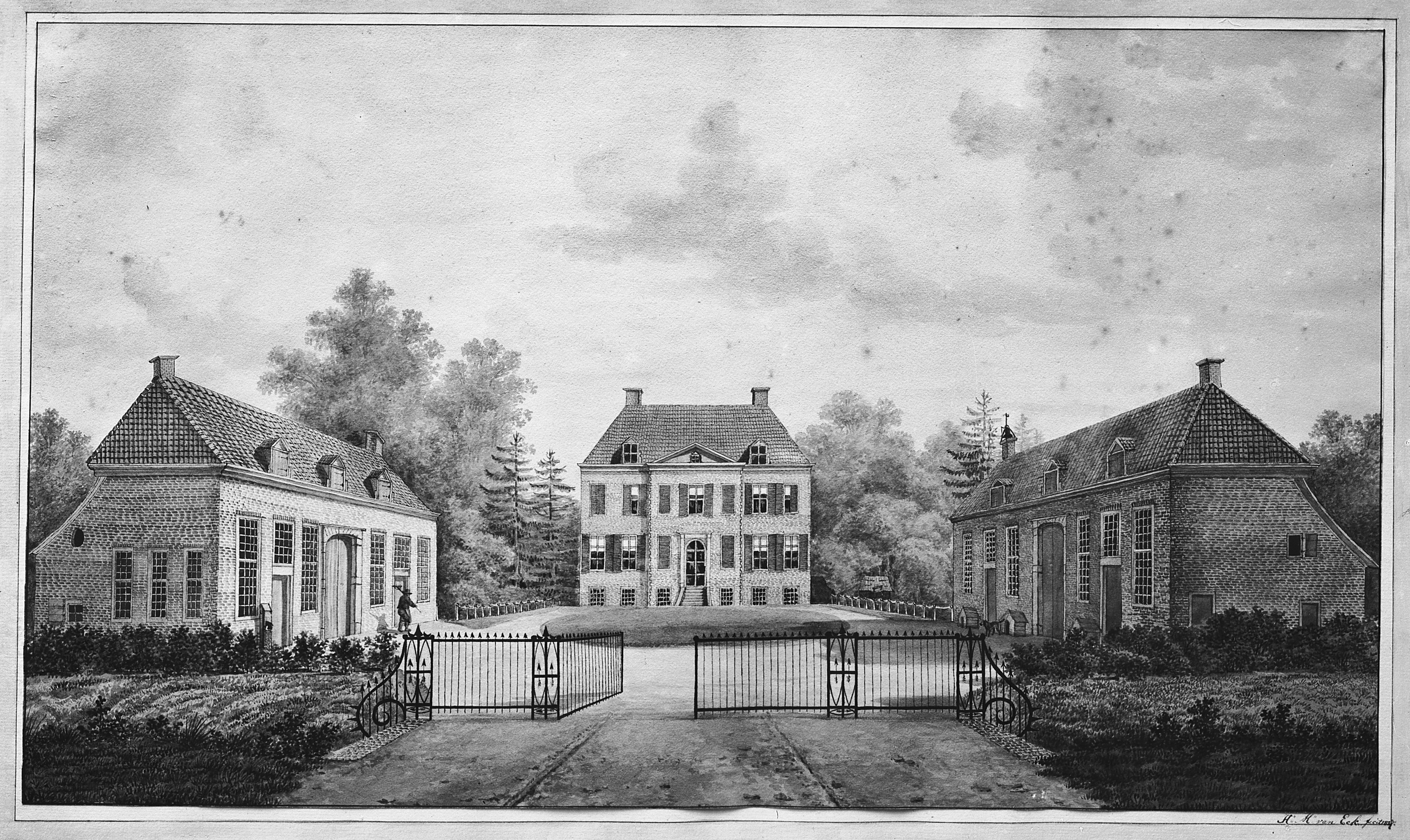
H. M. van Eck: Overview of Nijenhuis, etching 1827, like his watercolor rendition.

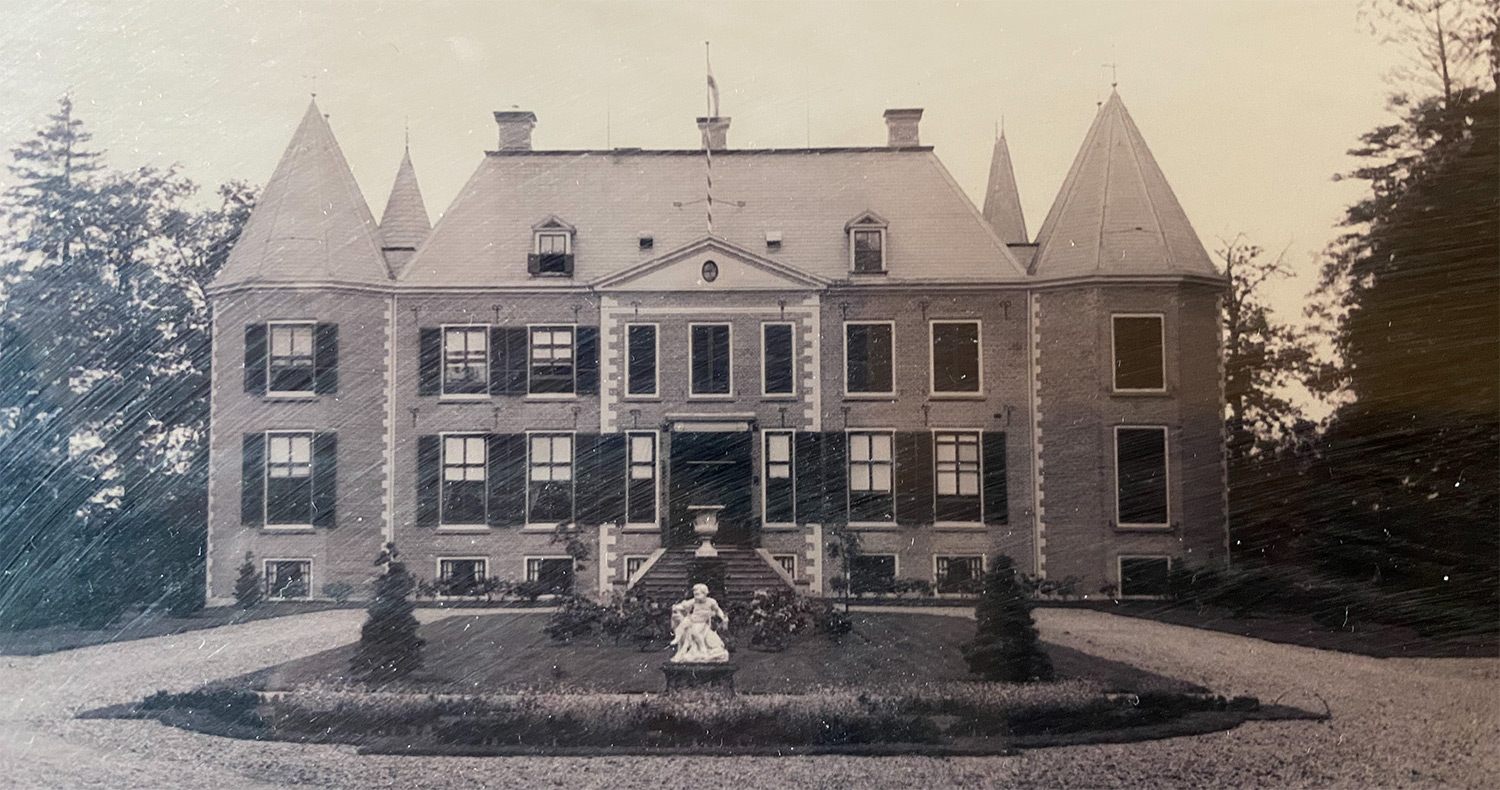
Photograph of Nijenhuis, around 1890.

=== Engraving and paintings ===
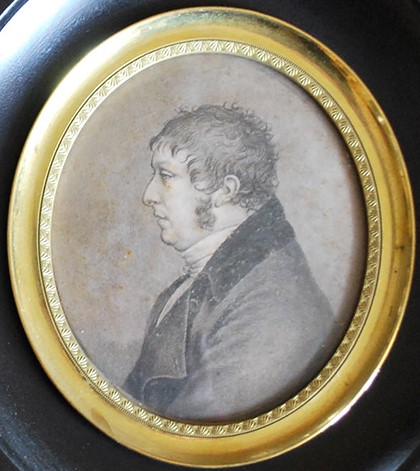
Rutger Jan Schimmelpenninck, engraving 'physionotrace', Paris, around 1800.

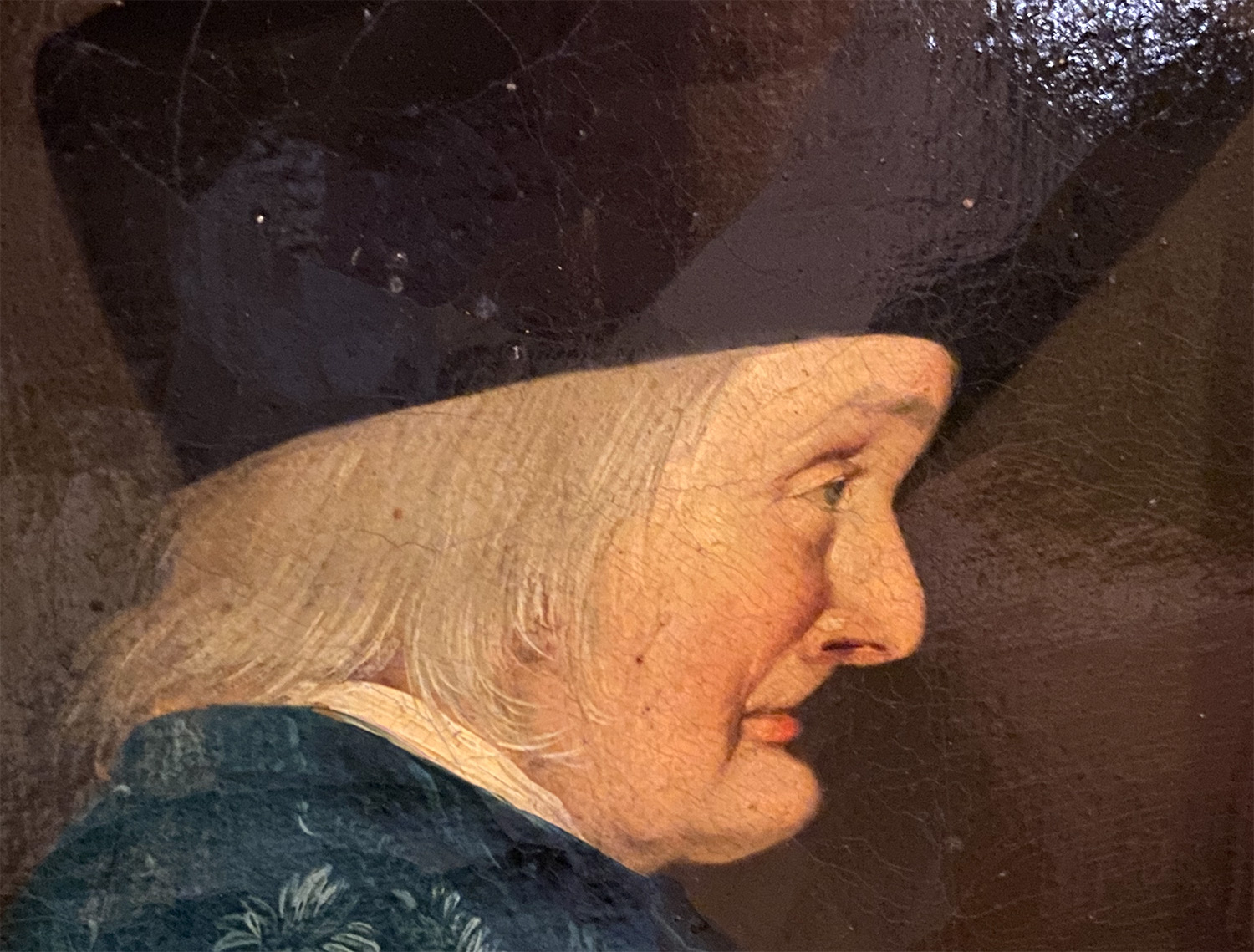
Louis-Léopold Boilly: Gerrit Schimmelpenninck, father of Rutger Jan, around 1804.

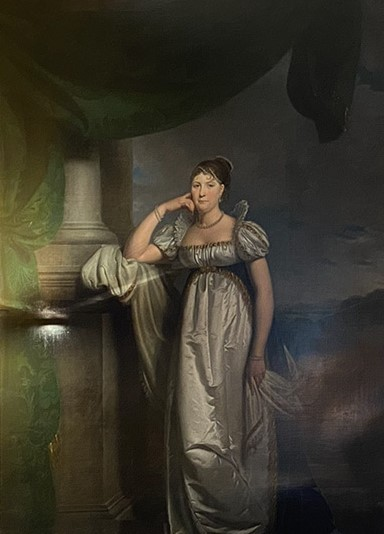
Charles Howard Hodges: Catharina Nahuys, Nijenhuis Diepenheim, 1804. Nijenhuis, Diepenheim.

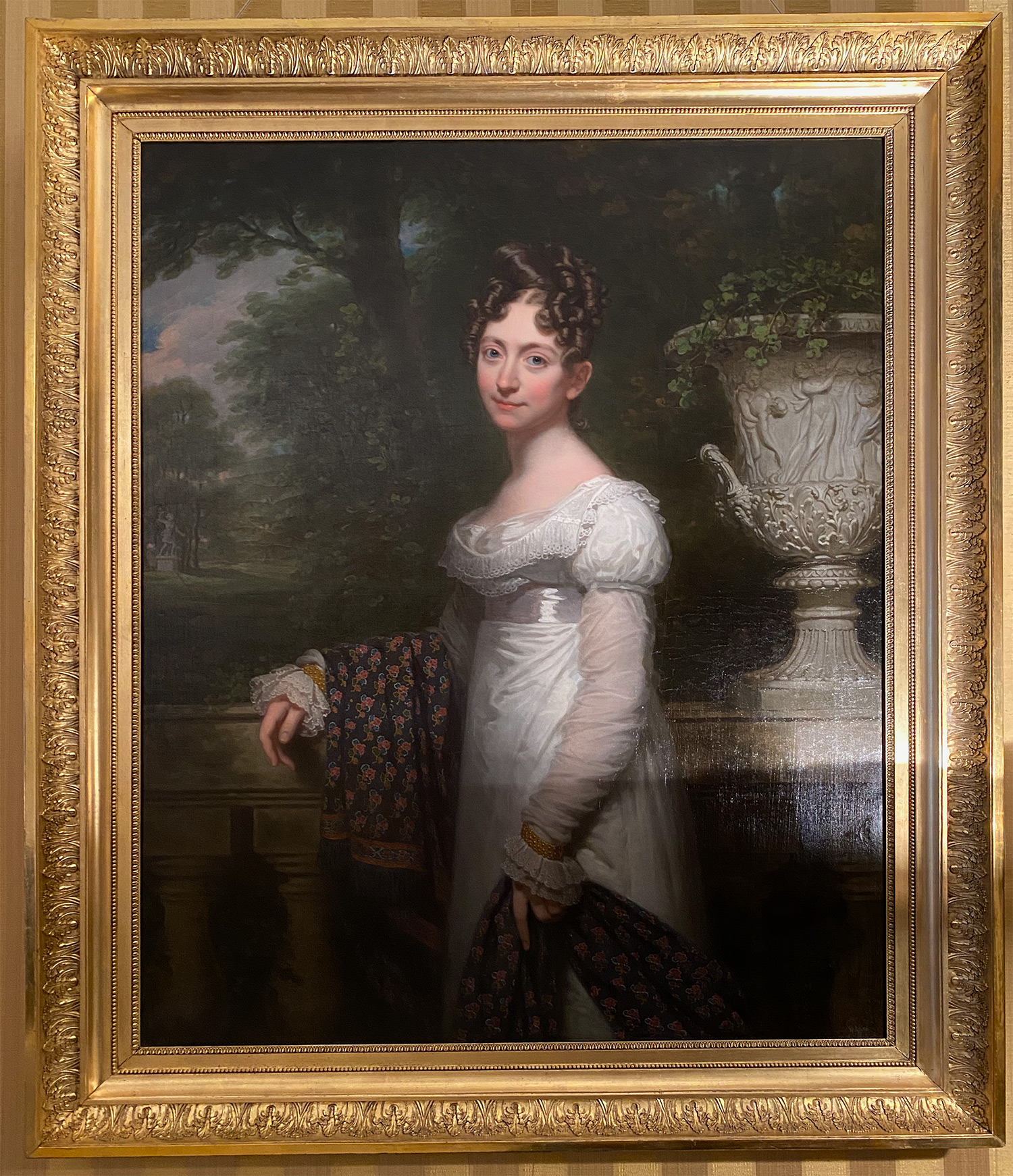
Charles Howard Hodges: Johanna Philippina von Knobelsdorff, wife of Gerrit Schimmelpenninck, about 1824.

== See also ==
- Nijenhuis (Olst-Wijhe) — a castle with the same name near Heino, also in the Dutch province of Overijssel.

== Literature ==
- A.J. Gevers and A.J. Mensema, De havezaten in Twente en hun bewoners (translation: The manors in Twente and their occupants), Rijksarchief in Overijssel en Waanders Uitgevers, Zwolle, 1995, ISBN 90-400-9766-6. In Dutch.

Media related to Nijenhuis, Diepenheim at Wikimedia Commons
