= Maïté Duval =

Dutch-French sculptor (1944–2019)

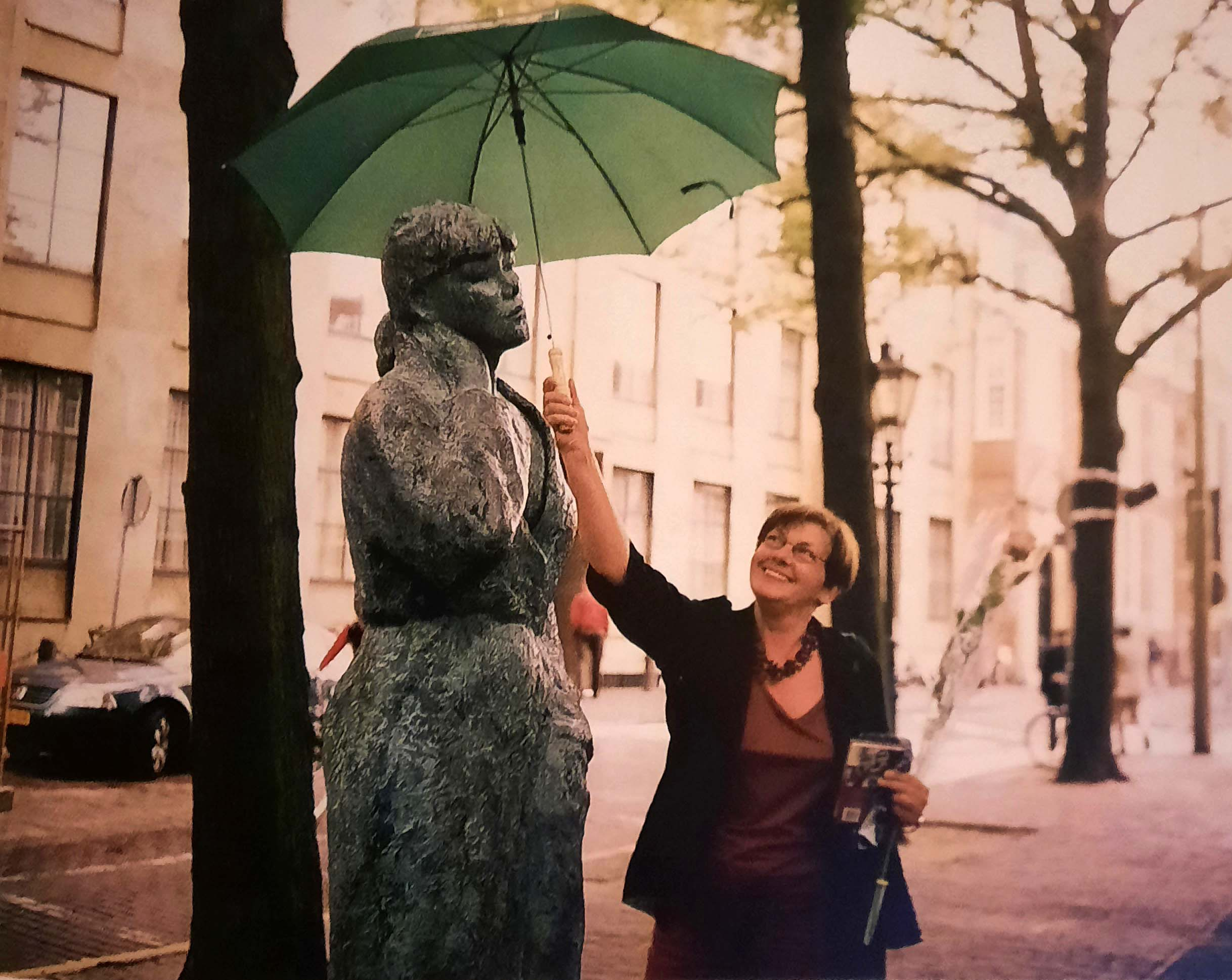
- Maïté Duval next to her sculpture Paula in kamerjas (1988, Paula in Dressing Gown)
- Born: 26 March 1944; Renazé, France
- Died: 2 November 2019 (aged 75); Zutphen, the Netherlands
- Resting place: Zutphen, the Netherlands
- Education: University of Rouen Normandy
- Known for: bronze sculptures
- Notable work: IJsberen (1986, Polar bears), Rust na arbeid (1987, Rest after work), Paula in kamerjas (1988, Paula in Dressing Gown), Ainsi Soit-elle (1992, Let her be this way)
- Spouse: Thierry Rijkhart de Voogd (deceased 1999)
- Website: https://maiteduval.nl/en/

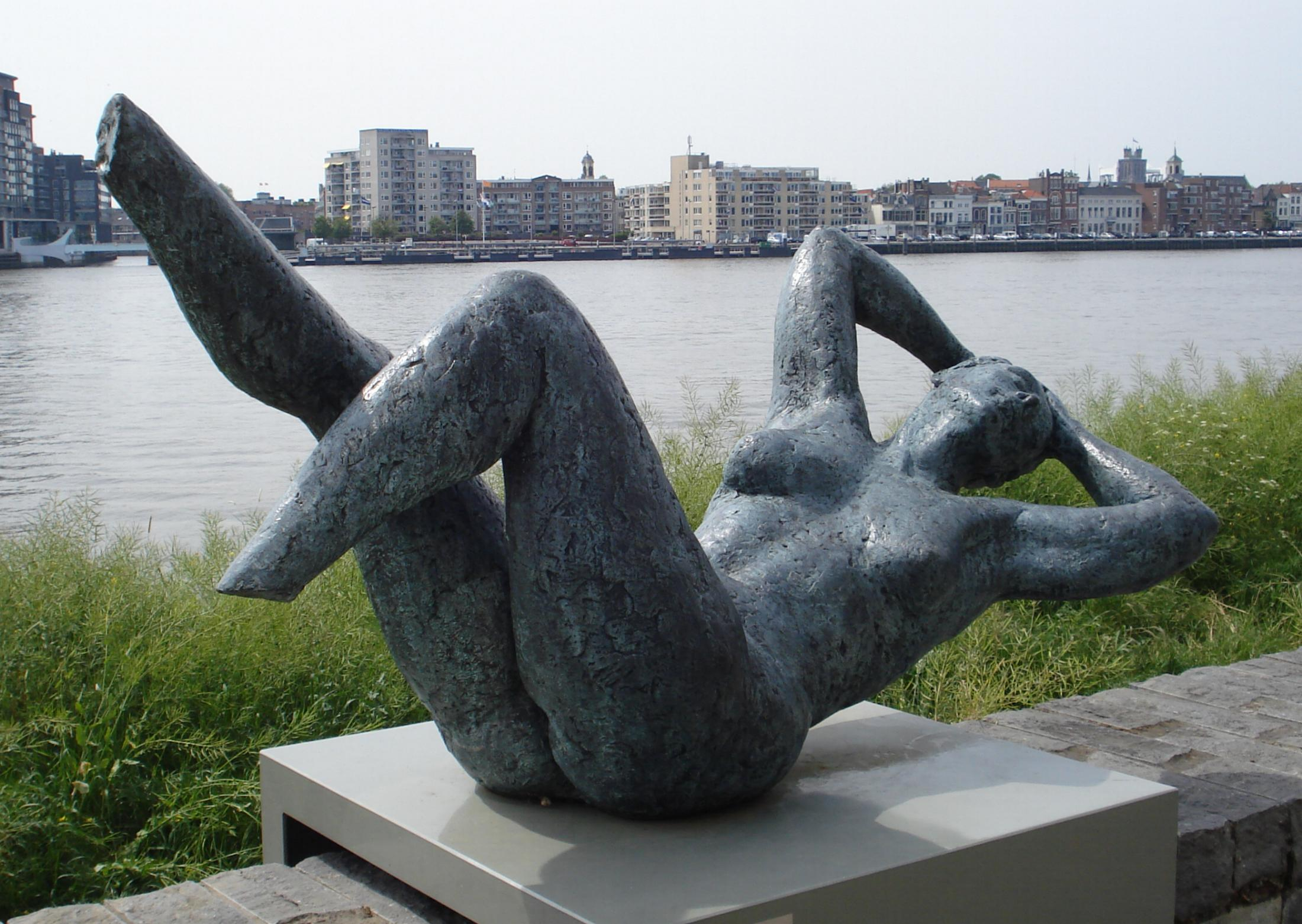
Maïté Duval: Volupté, Beeldenboulevard Papendrecht (Sculpture Boulevard), Merwehoofd, Papendrecht, the Netherlands. Photo 2011.

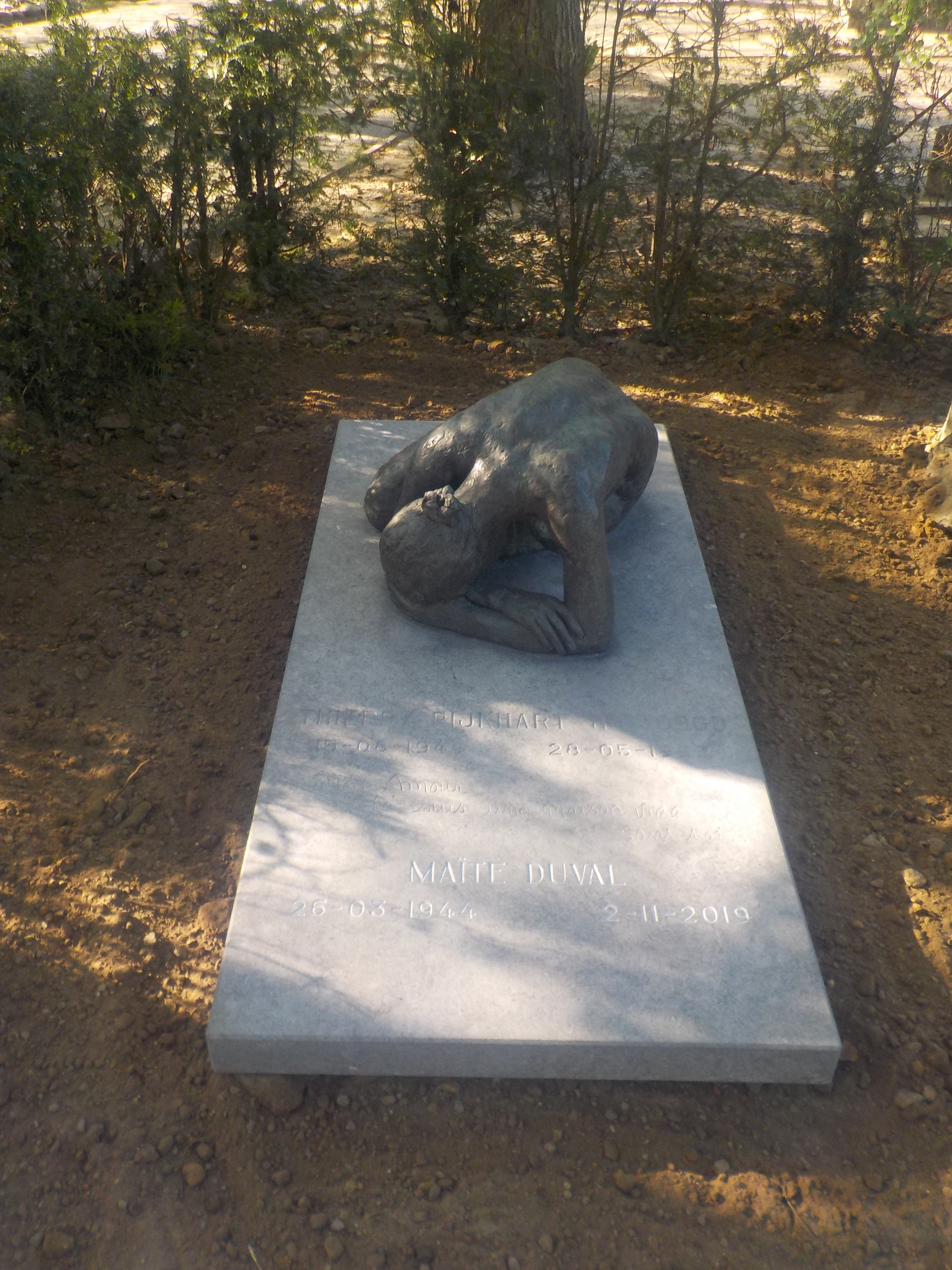
Tombstone of Maïté Duval with her sculpture Ingekeerd (Introverted), Zutphen, the Netherlands.

Marie-Thérèse Marguerite Jeanne (Maïté) Duval (26 March 1944 – 2 November 2019) was a French-born Dutch sculptor and drafter.

== Life and work ==
Maïté Duval was born on 26 March 1944 in Maïté Rijkhart de Voogd-Duval, Renazé (Mayenne, Pays de la Loire, France). She studied literature at the University of Rouen Normandy. In 1968 she moved to the Netherlands where she started her career as a self-taught sculptor in 1974. Her work was presented at many group and solo exhibitions, including those at Museum Henriette Polak (Zutphen, 1978 and 1996), Singer Museum (Laren, North Holland, 1983), Galerie Mia Joosten (Amsterdam, 1998), Beeldentuin Interart (Heeswijk, 1993–1999) and Den Haag Sculptuur (The Hague, 2003).

Duval lived and worked in Zutphen, where she exhibited her works in her atelier and sculpture garden. She was married to the painter Thierry Rijkhart de Voogd (1944–1999), who was likewise of French birth.

Duval became known as a sculptor of "the female form", although there were important exceptions, like De Gans (The Goose, 1981) and IJsberen (Polar bears, 1986).

Duval died in Zutphen on 2 November 2019 at the age of 75. Her sculpture Ingekeerd (Introverted, 1989) was placed on her grave in Zutphen.

== Statues by Duval in the public space ==
The dates given for each sculpture are the years of creation and subsequent copies at the original locations. Statues include:

- Bérendine (1976), municipal school in Voorst (1977), De Beukenhof in Loosdrecht (1987)
- Schouders (1976, Shoulders), Centraal Beheer, Apeldoorn
- Torso cambré (1979, Arched torso), De Hanzehof, Zutphen (1996)
- Rêverie (1980), town hall of Voorst in Twello (1982) and De Sokkerwei, Castricum (2003)
- De Gans (1981, The Goose), town hall of Deventer (1982), Voorst (1987) and Kleidijk, Rhoon (2003)
- Else (1982), 't Veld Paasberg, Terborg (1989) and Oude Bornhof, Zutphen (1990)
- Bérendine (1984), Lochem (1987), De Scheg, Deventer
- Bérendine (1985), town hall Zutphen, location Warnsveld
- Zuster van het Gemeene Leven op het bleekveld (1985, Sister of the Common Life on the bleaching field), Agnietenhof, Zutphen. Also a preparatory study in Museum Catharijneconvent, Utrecht
- Monument Stormramp of 1925 (1985, Tornado monument), Kerkplein, Borculo
- IJsberen (1986, Polar bears), Callunaplein, Dieren
- IJsberen – small version (1986), Verpleeghuis Lückerheide, Kerkrade (1994) and 't Bouwhuis, Enschede (2004)
- Rust na arbeid (1987, Rest after work), Dorpsplein, Klarenbeek
- De Sprong (1987, The jump), Henriette Polaklaan, Zutphen (1996)
- Paula in kamerjas (1988, Paula in Dressing Gown) in the Sculpture Garden of Museum de Fundatie (Heino, Netherlands) and previously in the nursing home De Hoogweide, Lochem (1994), Medisch Spectrum Twente, Enschede (1998) and in Hoog Soeren (2010)
- Melancholie (1991, Melancholia), Museum Henriette Polak, Zutphen. In 2009 relocated to the entrance hall of the Stedelijk Museum Zutphen
- Draaiende vrouw (1991, Spinning woman), ING Bank, Zutphen (1997)
- Ainsi Soit-elle (1992, This is who she is), De Koppellaan, Beek en Donk (1994), Stationsstraat, Apeldoorn (1995) and Belvédère, Breda (2007)
- Geste libre (1996, Free gesture), Frans Halslaan, Zutphen (2006)
- Volupté (2000); Beeldenboulevard Papendrecht (Sculpture Boulevard), Merwehoofd, Papendrecht, the Netherlands, 2011; Deventerweg, Zutphen, 2022.

== Gallery of her sculptures in the Netherlands ==
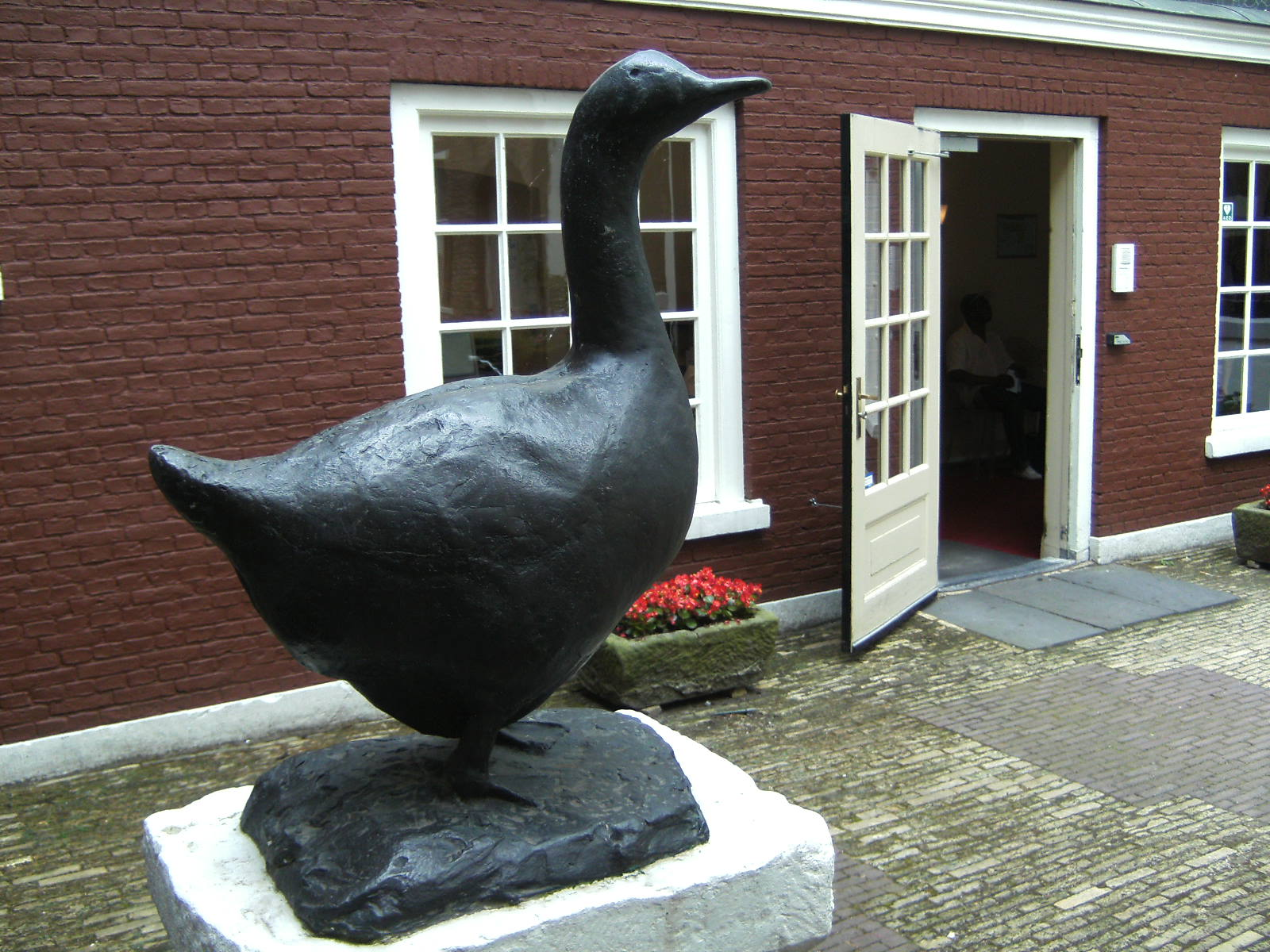
De Gans (1982, translated title: The Goose), Deventer

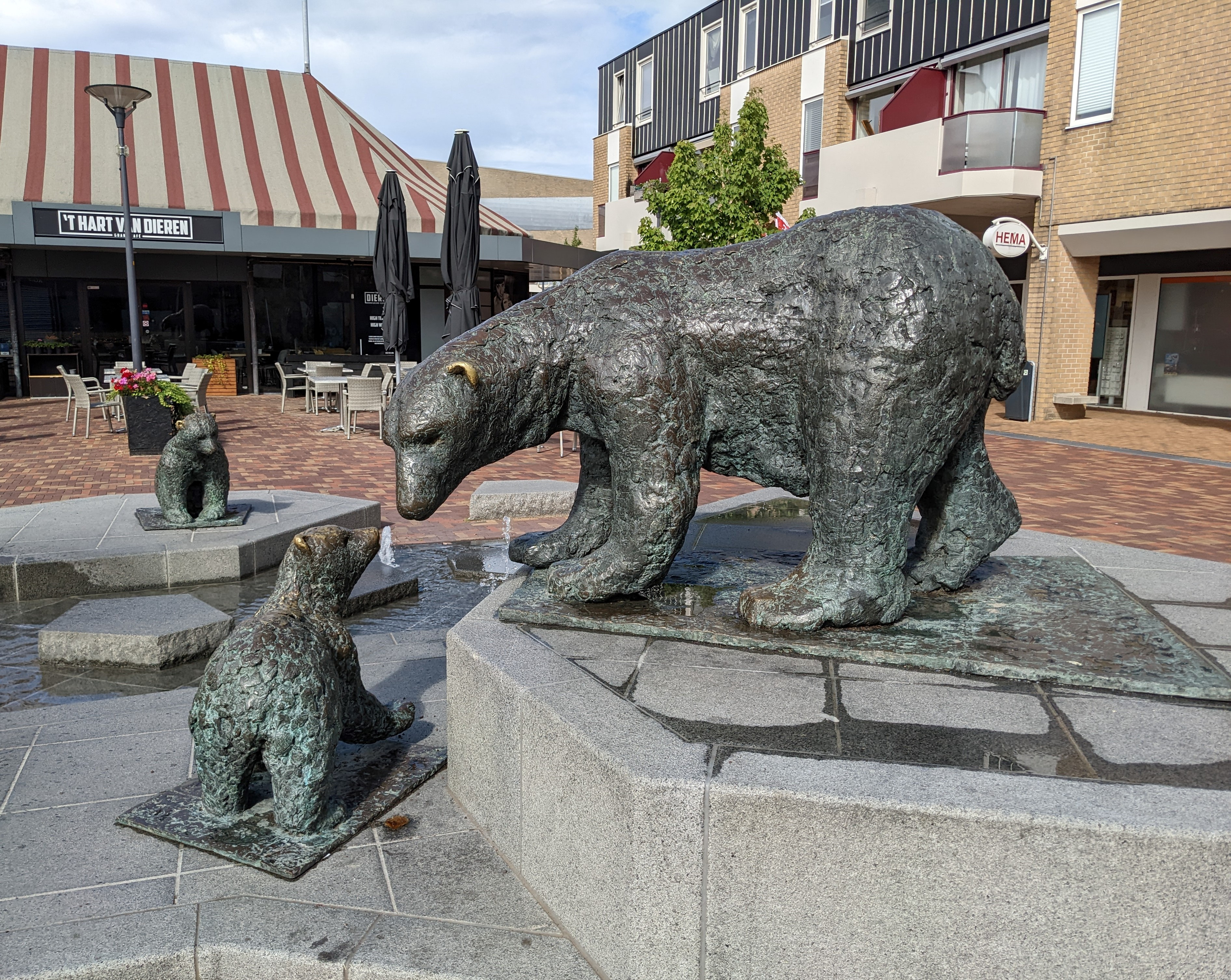
IJsberen (1986, Polar bears), Dieren, the Netherlands

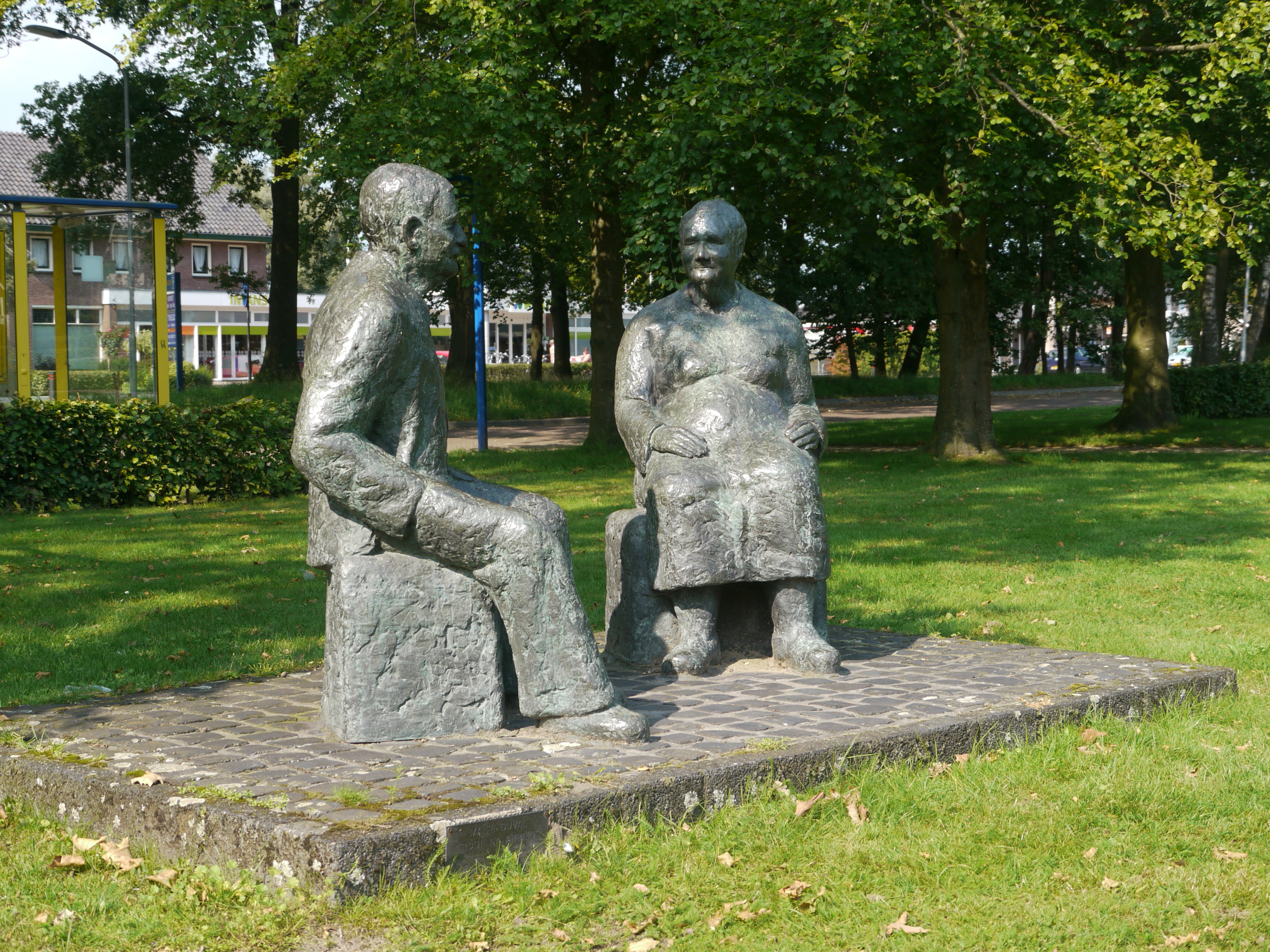
Rust na arbeid, also informally Grand-père grand-mère (1987, Rest after work, and Grandfather grandmother, the parents of the artist), Klarenbeek

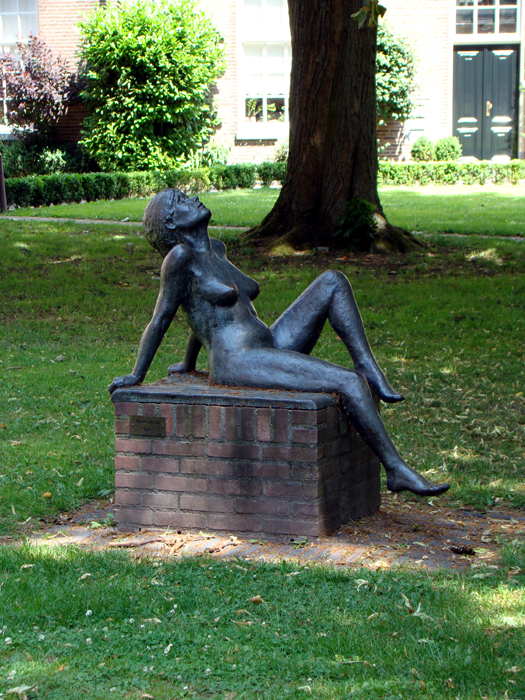
Else (1990), Zutphen

== Public collections ==
Work by Maïté Duval can be found in various public art collections in the Netherlands:

- CODA Museum (nl), Apeldoorn
- Mariënheem sculpture garden (nl), Raalte
- Museum de Fundatie, Zwolle
- Museum Catharijneconvent, Utrecht
- Nijenhuis Castle sculpture garden near Heino, a part of Museum de Fundatie
- Stedelijk Museum Zutphen (nl), Zutphen curates the largest collection: eight sculptures and four drawings.

== See also ==
- List of Dutch sculptors
