= Ursula van Beckum =

Dutch Anabaptist noblewoman

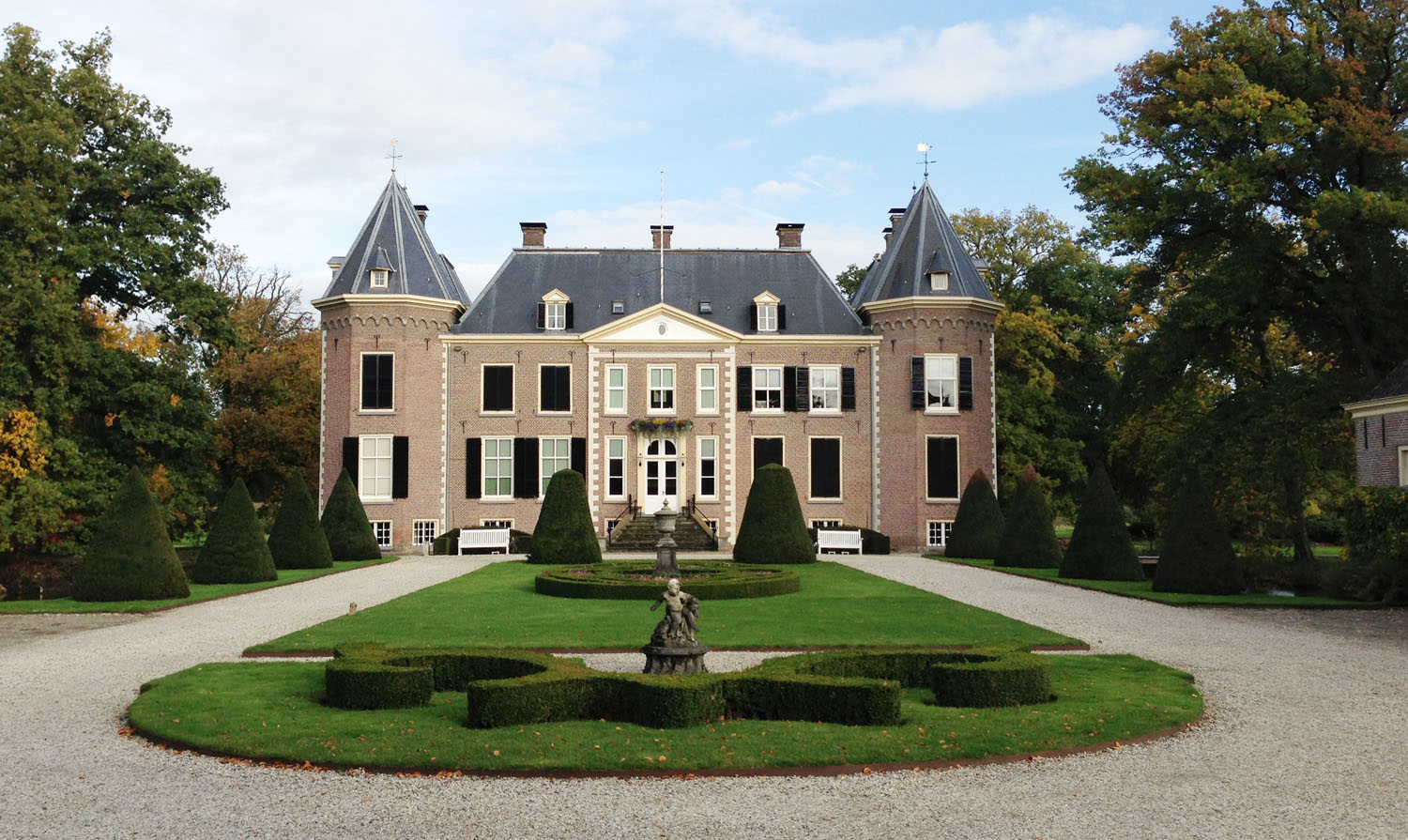
Nijenhuis in Diepenheim today

Ursula van Beckum (née von Werdum; before 1520 – 13 November 1544) was a Dutch Anabaptist noblewoman who was burned at the stake for heresy in Delden, the Netherlands.

She was born as the daughter of Ulrich von Werdum (d. 1530) and Armgard von Fikensolt. On 12 June 1538, she married Johan Hendrik van Beckum and went to live with him in Nijenhuis, his castle in Diepenheim. Her sister-in-law Maria van Beckum became a follower of David Joris and was sent out of her house by her stepmother as an Anabaptist. She fled to Ursula who took her in. In 1542, the Anabaptists were declared heretics in the Netherlands. Maria was arrested and Ursula accompanied her out of pity. Both women were then interviewed, and later were sentenced to death by burning. Their case attracted a lot of attention, mostly because it was not clear whether Ursula shared the views of her sister-in-law or not. Her husband survived her by nearly two decades.
