= Thierry Rijkhart de Voogd =

French-born Dutch realist painter

- Born: 15 August 1944; Grand-Couronne near Rouen, France
- Died: 25 May 1999 (aged 54); Zutphen, the Netherlands
- Education: École Régionale des Beaux-Arts de Rouen
- Known for: paintings, murals
- Spouse: Maïté Duval (deceased 2019)
- Parent(s): Abraham de Voogd and Jans Rijkhart

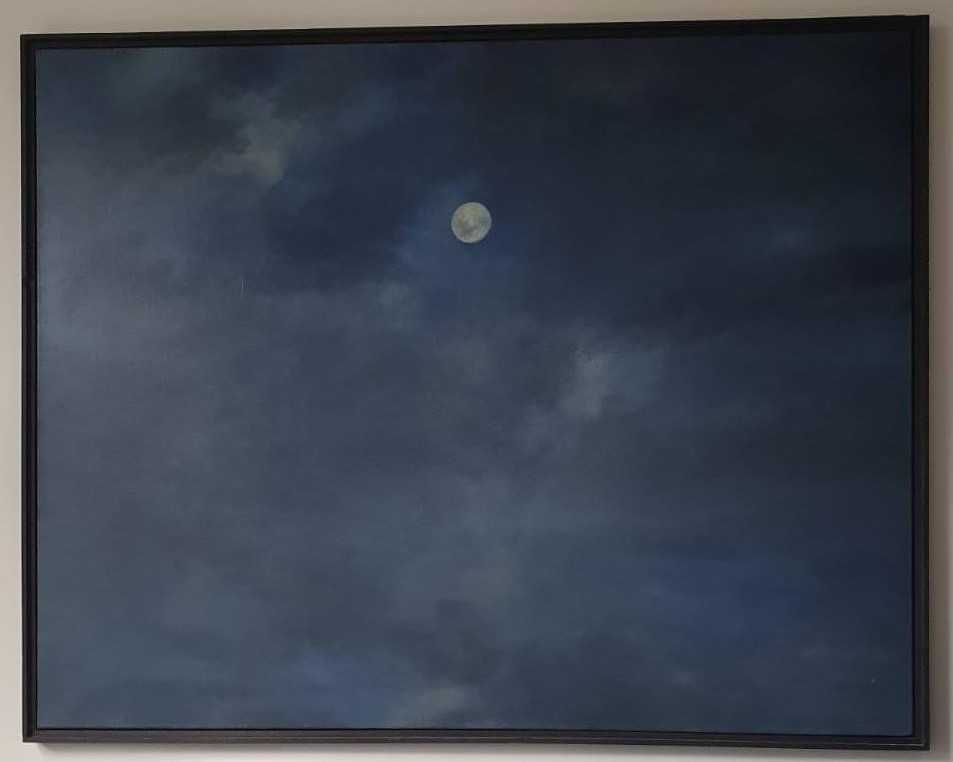
Thierry Rijkhart de Voogd: La Lune (The Moon), 1981. Acrylic paint on canvas. 110x140 cm, Maïté Duval collection, 1981.

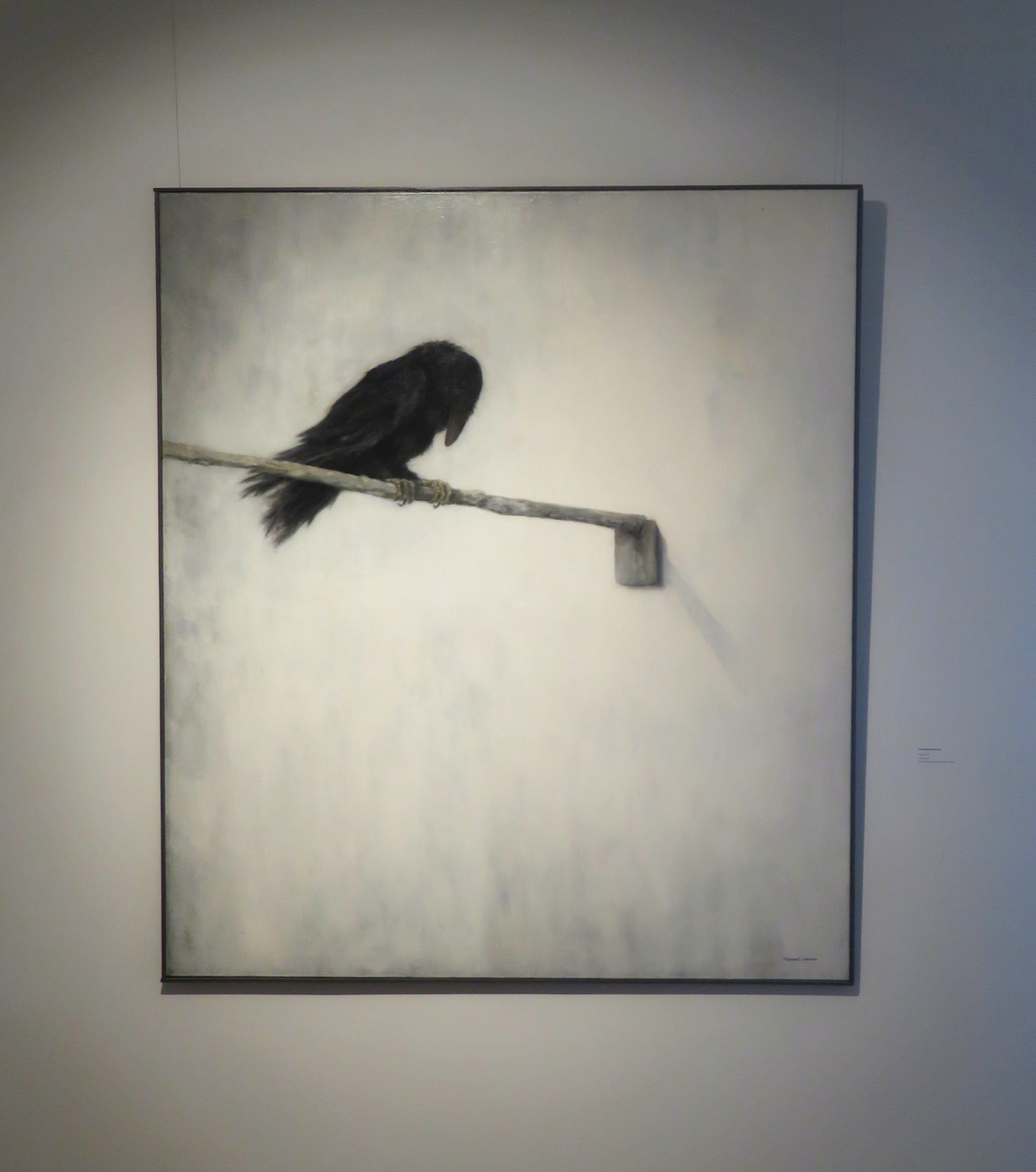
Thierry Rijkhart de Voogd: De Kraai (The Crow). Acrylic paint on canvas. Stedelijk Museum Zutphen, the Netherlands.

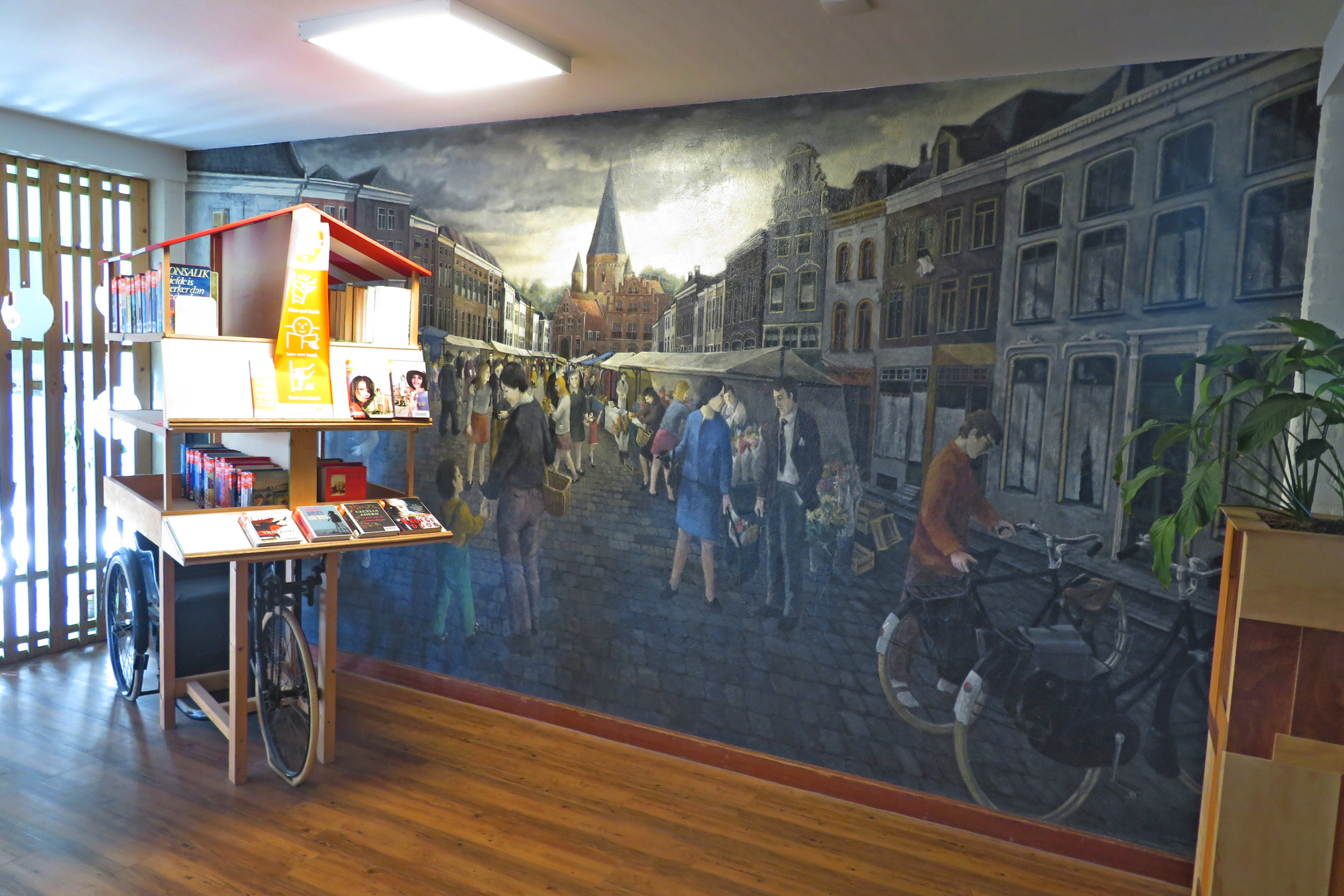
The hall of nursing home De Benring in Voorst, the Netherlands, with the mural Zaadmarkt in Zutphen (Seed market in Zutphen, 2.50 by 5.10 m.) by Thierry Rijkhart de Voogd.

Thierry Marc Rijkhart de Voogd (also Rykhart de Voogd; 15 August 1944 – 28 May 1999) was a French-born Dutch realist painter of still life, landscapes, figures, portraits and animals.

== Life ==
Thierry Rijkhart de Voogd was born in Grand-Couronne near Rouen, France, on 15 August 1944. He was the son of a Dutch couple who had emigrated to France. He studied at a young age at the École Régionale des Beaux-Arts de Rouen in the years 1959–1962. He then worked as an artist in France and married the later sculptor Maïté Duval in 1967. The couple moved to the Netherlands where Rijkhart de Voogd had his atelier in Voorst (1968–1987) and Zutphen (1987-1999). The artistic archives of both Duval and Rijkhart de Voogd were donated to the regional archive in Zutphen. Rijkhart de Voogd's work can be found in public buildings in the Netherlands and France, and in private and museum collections. He died in Zutphen, the Netherlands, on 28 May 1999.

== Works ==
Rijkhart de Voogd created many paintings, mainly using acrylic paint on canvas, such as:

- Maïté, gouache, 56x46 cm, Maïté Duval collection, 1966.
- Mural La retraite aux parapluies (The umbrella retreat), La Bouille city hall, France, 1968.
- Tombé du ciel (Fallen from the sky), 55x33 cm, private collection, 1973.
- Lenteschaduw (Shadow of spring), 40x40 cm, private collection, 1976.
- IJssellucht (Air above the river IJssel), 100x100 cm, Stedelijk Museum Zutphen, 1976.
- Knotwilg (Pollard willow), 120x90 cm, private collection, 1976.
- Achter de duinen (Behind the dunes), 90x120 cm, private collection, 1977.
- De laatste geranium (The last geranium), 60x80 cm, Stedelijk Museum Zutphen, 1976.
- Petit nuage (Small cloud), 100x110 cm, private collection, 1981.
- La lune (The Moon), 110x140 cm, Maïté Duval collection, 1981.
- Lentemorgen (Spring morning), 40x50 cm, private collection, 1982.

== Exhibitions ==
Exhibitions of his work include:

- Galérie Lemonnier, Rouen, 1962.
- Maison Descartes, Amsterdam, 1974.
- Institut Néerlandais, Paris, 1976.
- Group exhibition Lucht (translation: Air), Stedelijk Museum Schiedam, 1978.
- Stadsmuseum Doetinchem, 1982.
- Singermuseum Laren, 1983.
- Group exhibition Vier vormen een kwartet (Four is a quartet), Museum Henriette Polak Zutphen, 1987.
- Het grootste in de kleinste dingen. Thierry Rijkhart de Voogd, 1944-1999 (The grand in the smallest things), Stedelijk Museum Zutphen, 2009.
- Maïté en Thierry (Maïté and Thierry), Museum Henriette Polak Zutphen, 2021.

== Sources ==
- Duister, Frans (1982). "Thierry Rijkhart de Voogd; de dingen ten opzichte van de ruimte (translation: Thierry Rijkhart de Voogd; objects in relation to space)". Kunstbeeld (in Dutch) (juni/juli). Alphen aan den Rijn: Samsom.
- Jeurissen, Lian (2009). Het grootste in de kleinste dingen. Thierry Rijkhart de Voogd, 1944-1999 (The grand in the smallest things) (in Dutch). Zutphen: Stedelijk Museum Zutphen. ISBN 978 90 8057 56 4 6. Published on occasion of the eponymous exhibition at the Stedelijk Museum Zutphen 2009-2010.
- Rijkhart de Voogd, Thierry; Visser, Mathilde (1978). Thierry Rijkhart de Voogd. 10 jaar wonen en werken in Nederland (Thierry Rijkhart de Voogd. Living and working in the Netherlands for 10 years. Exhibition catalogue.) (in Dutch). Zutphen: Museum Henriette Polak (Zutphen), Walburg Pers.
- Wagner, Anna (1982). Thierry Rijkhart de Voogd schilder (Thierry Rijkhart de Voogd painter) (in Dutch). Zutphen: Nauta.

== External links with images of De Voogd's works ==
Media related to Thierry Rijkhart de Voogd at Wikimedia Commons

- De populieren (The poplars). Painting on canvas. "Sold. Lot 49735175. Thiery Rijkhart de Voogd - De populieren". lot-art.com. LOT-ART. THE ART INVESTMENT PLATFORM. 24 July 2021. Image at encrypted-tbn0.gstatic.com. Consulted on 15 January 2023.
- Groet aan Thierry (Greetings to Thierry). Painting on canvas. "Bart J. Geerling". bartgeerling.nl. Bart Geerling. 2013..
- Hinkelbaan (Hopscotch tiles). Painting on canvas. "Hinkelbaan, 1980 Lot 40 Nazomerveiling - augustus 2018". wavemaker.venduehuis.com. Venduehuis. 2018.
- Mandarijntje (Tangerine). Painting on canvas. "Bart J. Geerling". bartgeerling.nl. Bart Geerling. 2013..
- Roof with attic window. Painting on canvas. "Thierry Rijkhart de Voogd - olieverf op doek - Vendu". images.kunstveiling.nl. 2023.
- Zaadmarkt in Zutphen (Seed market in Zutphen). Mural in Woonzorgcentrum (care center for the elderly) De Benring in Voorst, the Netherlands. "Zaadmarkt in Zutphen Actie voor behoud muurschildering Benring". destentor.nl. De Stentor. 15 October 2010.
