= Warmelo =

Historical house in the Netherlands

Coordinates: 52.1964°N 6.5474°E

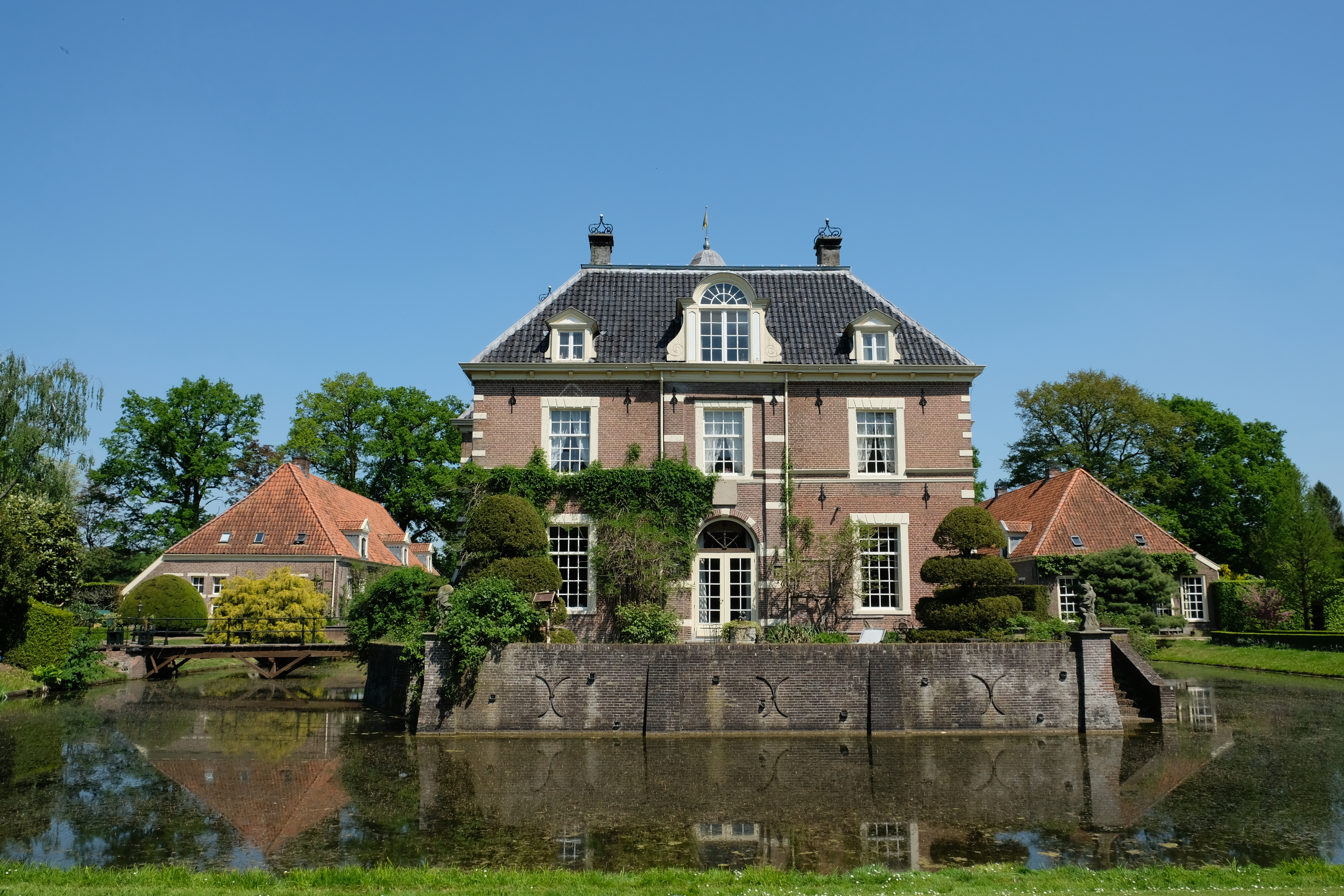
Warmelo, 2018

Warmelo is a large historical house in the town of Diepenheim, located in the municipality of Hof van Twente, Overijssel, Netherlands. Originally, it was a gatehouse of a manor house. It is often referred to as the "Warmelo Castle" (Kasteel Warmelo). In 1992, a major restoration project of its gardens and the moat system was undertaken.
