= Jacob de Kempenaer =

Dutch politician

His Excellency Jacob de Kempenaer
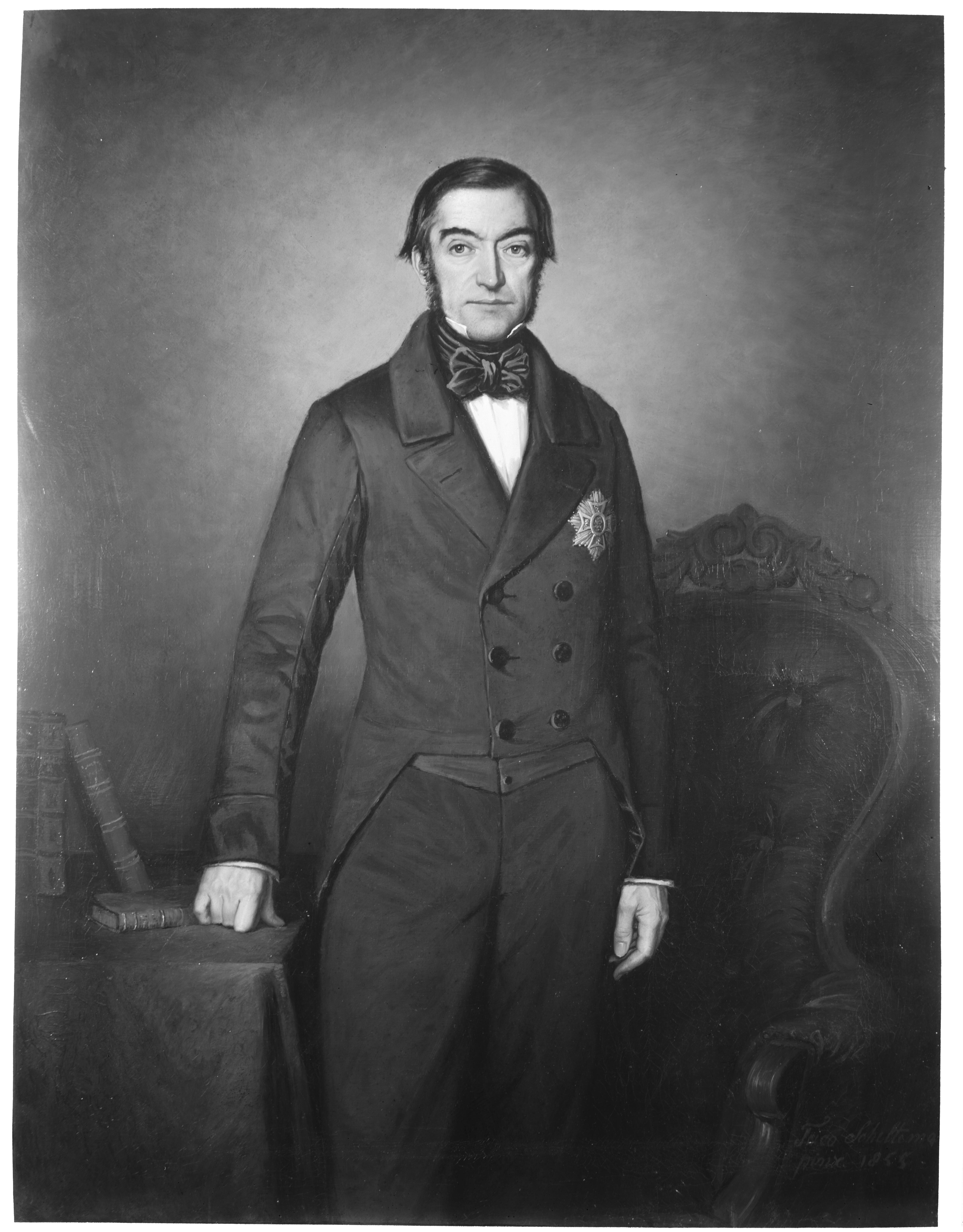
- de Kempenaer in 1855

Chairman of the Council of Ministers
- In office 21 November 1848 – 1 November 1849
- Monarchs: William II; William III
- Preceded by: Gerrit Schimmelpenninck
- Succeeded by: Johan Rudolph Thorbecke

Personal details
- Born: Jacobus Mattheüs de Kempenaer; 6 July 1793 Amsterdam, Netherlands
- Died: 12 February 1870 (aged 76) Arnhem, Netherlands
- Spouse: Arnoldina Jacoba Gerlings
- Children: 6

Jacobus Mattheüs de Kempenaer (6 July 1793 – 12 February 1870) was a Dutch politician and lawyer who served as Chairman of the Council of Ministers from November 1848 to November 1849. He served as a member of the House of Representatives, chairman of the board of Commerce for Arnhem, a member of the city board, and a member of the Provincial States of Gelderland.

Initially in the House of Representatives, de Kempenaer was considered a liberal. In 1844, he was among nine men to propose amending the Constitution of the Netherlands. De Kempenaer was appointed to the Constitution Commission headed by Johan Rudolph Thorbecke in 1848, and as Minister of the Interior. He soon became de facto Prime Minister, playing an important role in the revision of the national Constitution. He resigned his offices in 1849 and subsequently became a conservative, opposing Thorbecke.

== Family ==
De Kempenaer was married in Haarlem on 19 August 1818 to Arnoldina Jacoba Gerlings (1796–1871). They had three sons and three daughters.

House of Representatives of the Netherlands
Preceded by Jasper Leemans	Member for Tiel; 1853–1860	Succeeded by Willem van Lidth de Jeude
Political offices
Preceded by Lodewijk Caspar Luzac	Minister of the Interior; 1848–1849	Succeeded by Johan Rudolph Thorbecke
