= Gerrit Schimmelpenninck =

Dutch businessman and politician (1794–1863)

His Excellency Gerrit, Count Schimmelpenninck
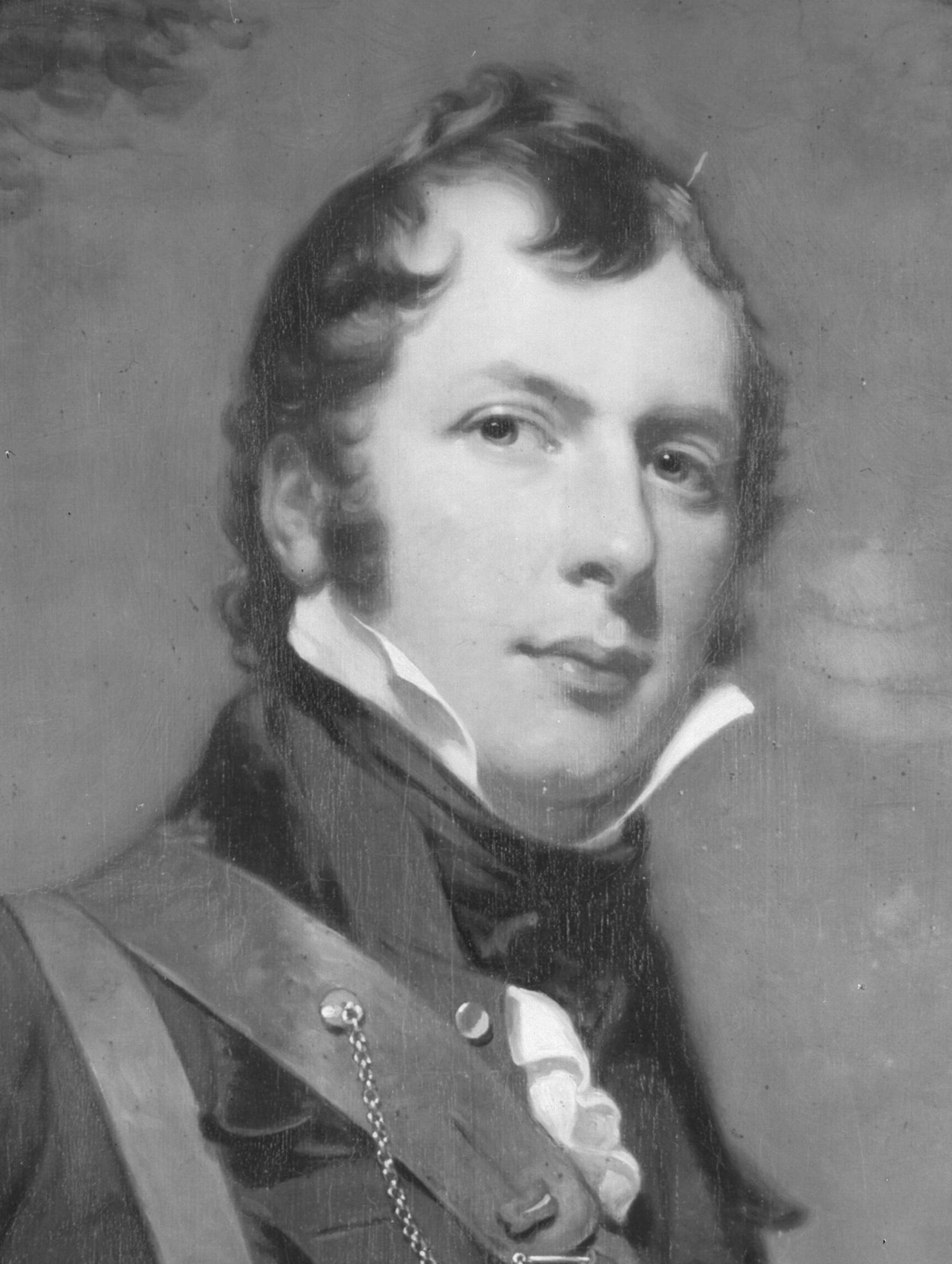

Chairman of the Council of Ministers
- In office 25 March 1848 – 17 May 1848
- Monarch: William II
- Preceded by: Office established
- Succeeded by: Jacob de Kempenaer

Personal details
- Born: Gerrit Schimmelpenninck; 25 February 1794 Amsterdam, Netherlands
- Died: 4 October 1863 (aged 69) Arnhem, Netherlands
- Occupation: Politician; civil servant; businessman

Gerrit, Count Schimmelpenninck (25 February 1794 – 4 October 1863) was a Dutch businessman and politician.

== Early life and business career ==
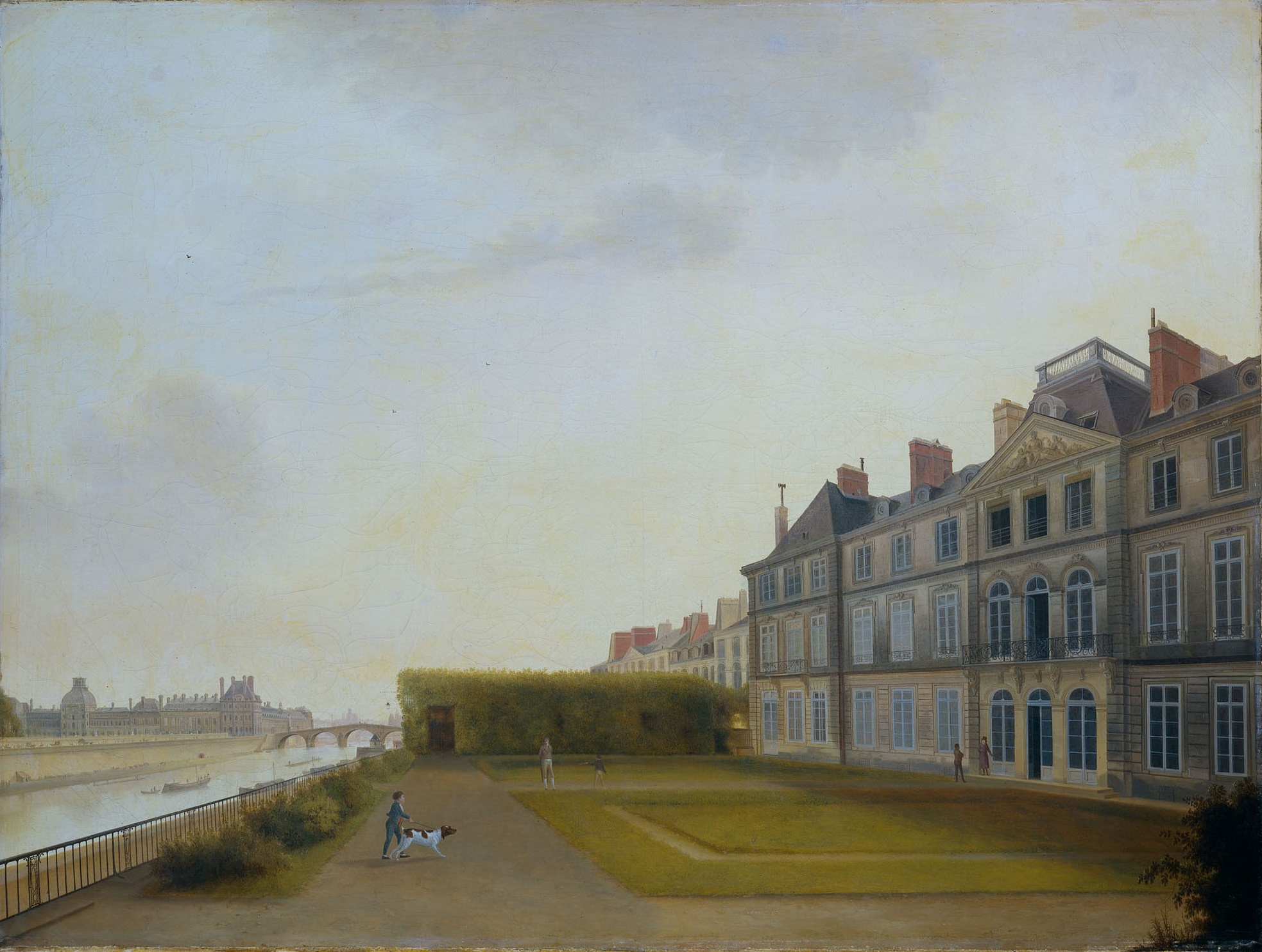
Painting (1801 or 1802) by Joseph August Knip of the garden of the official residence of Rutger Jan Schimmelpenninck as Batavian ambassador to France. It depicts Gerrit as a child holding a dog.

Gerrit Schimmelpenninck was born in Amsterdam on 25 February 1794. His parents were Catharina Nahuijs and Rutger Jan Schimmelpenninck, who had a law firm in Amsterdam and would serve as grand pensionary of the Batavian Commonwealth between 1805 and 1806. He had an older sister, Catherina "Kitty", and the family moved to The Hague in 1796, when Rutger Jan became a National Assembly member. They returned to Amsterdam the following year after he decided not to seek another term in the Assembly. Rutger Jan was appointed ambassador of the Batavian Republic to France in Paris in June 1798, causing the family to relocate again. Rutger Jan was sent to Amiens in December 1801 to negotiate peace between England and France. Gerrit was present during the signing of the resulting peace treaty on 27 March 1802 as a lieutenant of the Hussars Regiment of the Batavian Commonwealth, having been named to that position because of his father's contributions. The family lived in London for a few months starting in November 1802 during Rutger Jan's short-lived ambassadorship to England before returning to the Netherlands. When Rutger Jan was named grand pensionary in May 1805, they moved into Huis ten Bosch in The Hague.

He received his primary education in The Hague and his later education by H. Wijnbeek at his father's Nijenhuis estate in Diepenheim. He enrolled at Leiden University on 12 November 1812, studying law until he was called back to his father's estate the following year to protect it during the War of the Sixth Coalition.

He did not return to study, instead interning at the trading company of Van Staphorst in Amsterdam. He later became a partner of the firm, and he was chosen as a member of Amsterdam Chamber of Commerce and Industry in 1820. He moved to The Hague in 1824 when he was appointed as one of five directors of the newly founded Dutch Trading Company by King William I. He became chairman of the company on 4 November 1827, again at the appointment of the king, serving in the position for five years. He moved with his family back to the Nijenhuis estate for health reasons in 1834, the same year he received his title of nobility. Schimmelpenninck joined the supervisory board of the Dutch Trading Company in 1835, staying on until his appointment as general secretary.

== Politics and diplomacy ==
He was appointed General Secretary of State on 4 November 1835, and he took office on 11 December 1835. Leading the State Secretary, a precursor to the King's Office, he became the highest-ranking civil servant of the Netherlands. His term ended on 30 November 1836, but his successor, Henri van Doorn van Westcapelle, had been acting in the position since 22 September. Schimmelpenninck subsequently returned to his estate. He was granted the honorary title of Minister of State on 1 December 1836, and he became a pro-government senator the same day.

He and his family moved to Saint Petersburg after he was appointed extraordinary envoy and minister plenipotentiary of the Russian court by William I in 1837. He served in his post for three years, and he had been made municipal councilor in Diepenheim and chairman of the church council upon his return to his estate. He remained a senator until 13 February 1849, and he was a member of the House of Representatives on behalf of Amsterdam between 12 July 1853 and 16 September 1854.

Schimmelpenninck was appointed Minister of Foreign Affairs and Minister of Finance on 25 March 1848. His appointments were temporary until definitive ministries would be formed. He also became Chairman of the Council of Ministers, a precursor to the modern-day position of prime minister. His views ranged from liberal to conservative. The primary reason of William II to get him to the Netherlands and have him be appointed as prime minister was to keep Thorbecke out of the Council of Ministers. His proposal to design a Constitution following British model, which would imply that the Senate could not be dissolved by the King, was rejected by the other ministers. His term ended on 17 May 1848, three days after he tendered his resignation, and he was succeeded by Jacob de Kempenaer.

He died in Arnhem on 4 October 1863.

== Honours ==
- Commander in the Order of the Netherlands Lion (1849)
- (Luxembourg) Grand Cross of the Order of the Oak Crown (1851)

Political offices
New title	Chairman of the Council of Ministers; 1848	Succeeded by Jacob de Kempenaer
