= Schimmelpenninck =

Schimmelpennin(c)k is a Dutch surname. Notable people with the surname include:

- Gerrit Schimmelpenninck, Prime Minister of the Netherlands (1848)
- Luud Schimmelpennink (born 1935), Dutch social inventor, industrial designer, entrepreneur and politician
- Mary Anne Schimmelpenninck (1778–1856), British writer in the anti-slavery movement
- Otto Schimmelpenninck van der Oije, bass guitarist of the bands Detonation and Delain
- Rutger Jan Schimmelpenninck (1761–1825), Dutch politician of the Batavian Republic
- Monique de Bissy (1923–2009), French/Belgian resistant during World War II
- Schimmelpenninck family

== See also ==
- Schimmelfennig, German equivalent
