= Schimmelfennig =

Schimmelfennig, Schimmelpfennig is a German surname, 'schimmel' means 'moldy' and 'pfennig' 'penny'. Notable people with the surname include:

- Alexander Schimmelfennig (1824–1865), Prussian soldier and political revolutionary
- Frank Schimmelfennig (born 1963), German professor
- Heinz Schimmelpfennig (1919–2010), German actor and director
- Roland Schimmelpfennig (born 1967), German theatre director and playwright

== See also ==
- Schimmelpenninck, Dutch equivalent
