= Nijenhuis (Olst-Wijhe) =

The Nijenhuis
- Het Nijenhuis
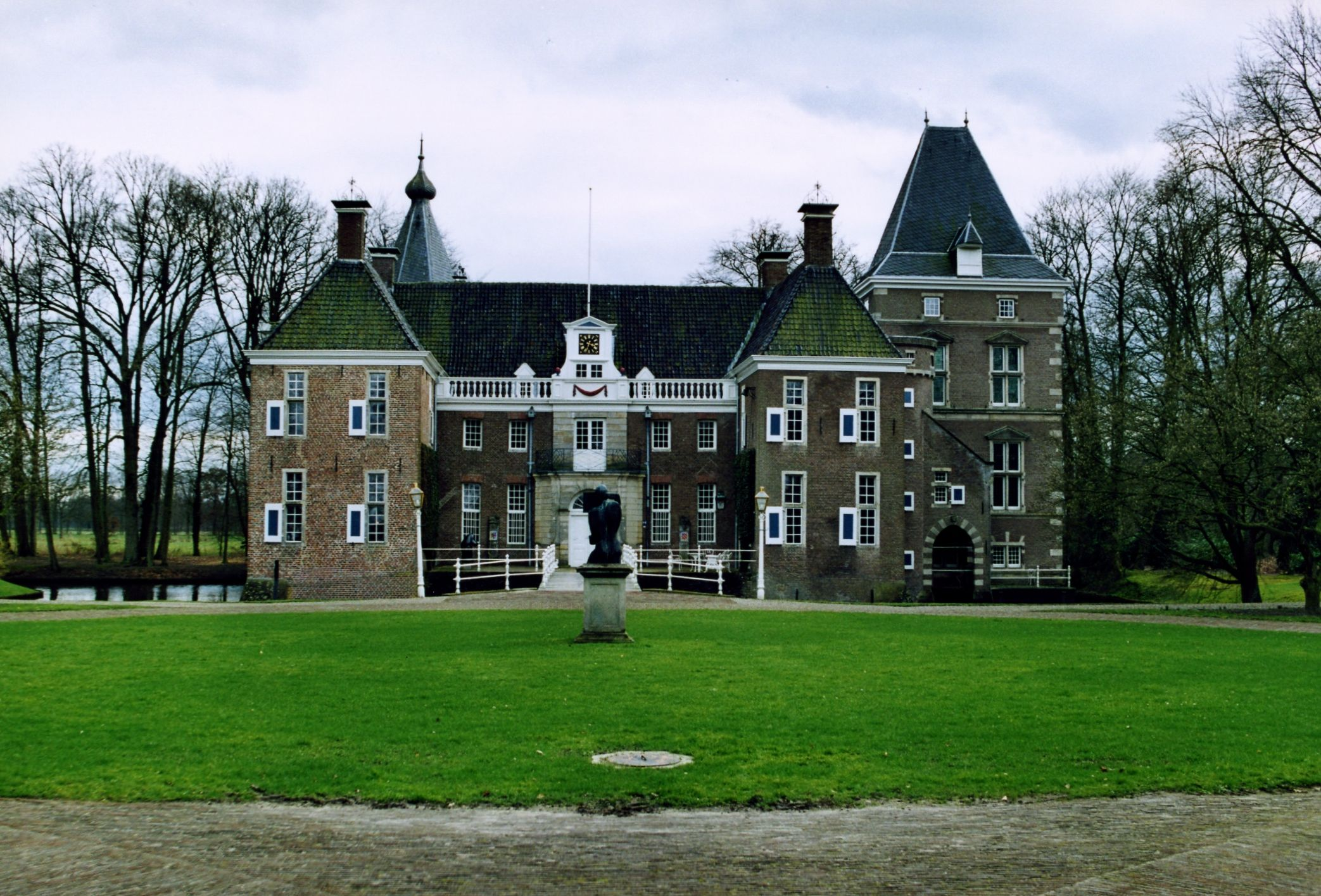
- The Nijenhuis in 2010

General information
- Town or city: Heino in Olst-Wijhe
- Country: Netherlands
- Coordinates: 52°25′1″N 6°12′47″E

The Nijenhuis is an estate near the village Heino in the province of Overijssel, The Netherlands. The estate holds an avezathe (a kind of manor house, typical for Overijssel).

The building is in use by Museum de Fundatie as an exhibition space for visual art. Part of the gardens house a collection of sculptures.

== History ==
The first written source of Nijenhuis is from 1382.

== Museum ==
From 1958 to 1984 Dirk Hannema lived at the estate. He located his collection of art in what is often called "kasteel het Nijenhuis" (Castle The Nijenhuis).

== See also ==
- Nijenhuis (Diepenheim) — a castle with the same name near Diepenheim, also in the Dutch province of Overijssel.
