= Diepenheim =

- Small city
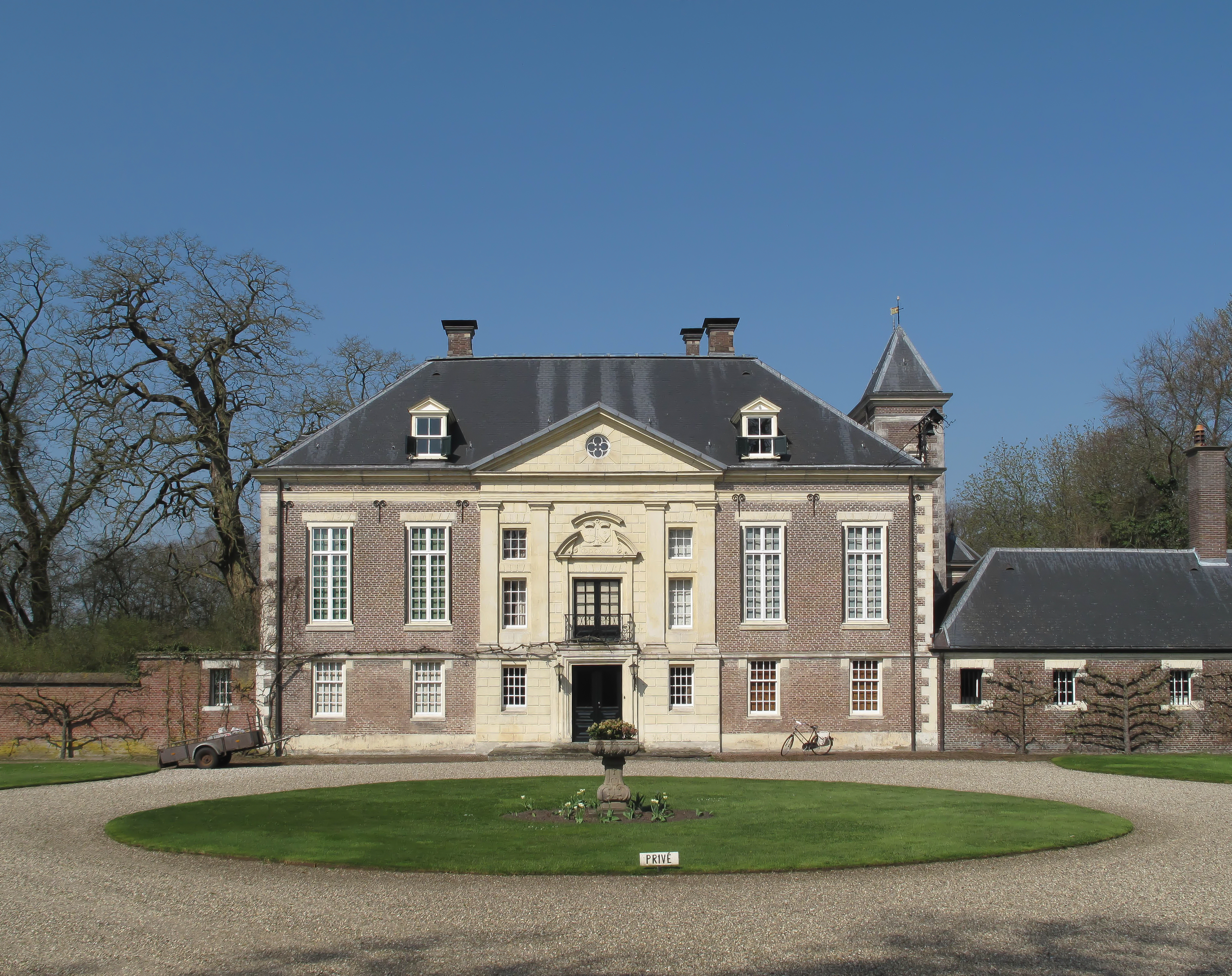
- Huize Diepenheim, manor house

- Flag Coat of arms

- Location in province of Overijssel in the Netherlands Diepenheim (Netherlands)
- Coordinates: 52°12′0″N 6°33′0″E
- Country: Netherlands
- Province: Overijssel
- Municipality: Hof van Twente

Area
  - Total: 26.58 km^{2} (10.26 sq mi)
- Elevation: 13 m (43 ft)

Population (2021)
  - Total: 2,615
  - Density: 98.38/km^{2} (254.8/sq mi)
- Time zone: UTC+1 (CET)
  - Summer (DST): UTC+2 (CEST)
- Postal code: 7478
- Dialing code: 0547

Diepenheim is a small city in the Dutch province of Overijssel. It is located in the municipality of Hof van Twente, about 5 km southwest of Goor. Diepenheim was a separate municipality until 2001, when it became a part of Hof van Twente.

== History ==
It was first mentioned in 1150 as de Dipenhem. The name probably means "settlement near low lying land". Diepenheim developed next to Huize Diepenheim. The original manor house was destroyed in 1177 by the Prince-Bishop of Münster who built a castle in its place. The castle was partially demolished after a 1536 siege. The current manor house dates from 1648, but has been extensively modified and altered.

In 1224, a parish church was built in Diepenheim. The city rights are from 1422, however it probably had become a city prior to 1379, but the archives were destroyed in a fire in 1597. The Dutch Reformed Church dates from 1679 and has a bell dating from 1366. Warmelo is a former manor house surrounded by a moat from the 17th century and is located to the west of Diepenheim.

Diepenheim remained a small city, and is nicknamed "Stedeke" (little city) by its inhabitants. In 1840, it was home to 666 people. In 2001, it was merged into Hof van Twente.

== Gallery ==
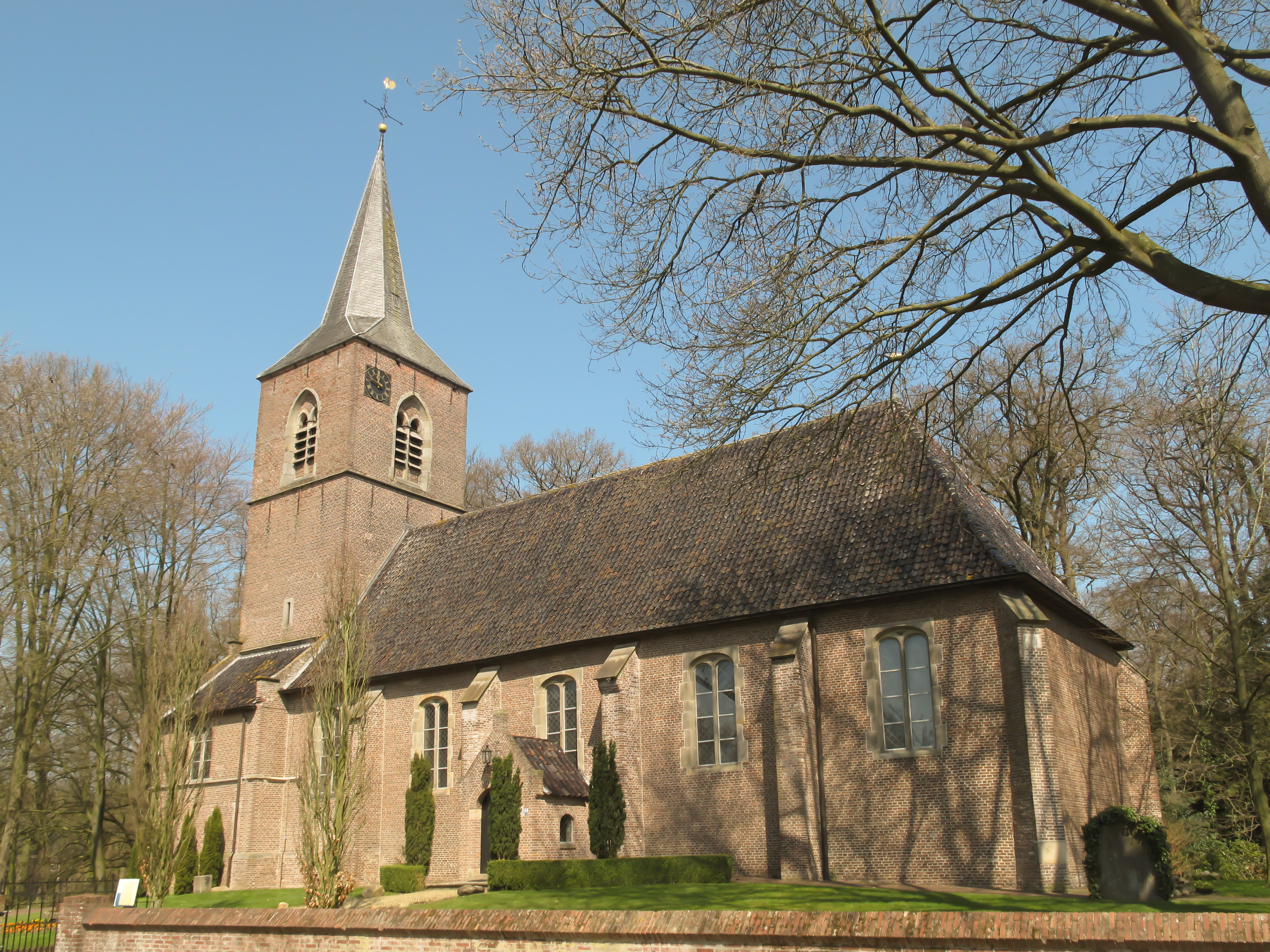
Diepenheim, church (Johanneskerk)

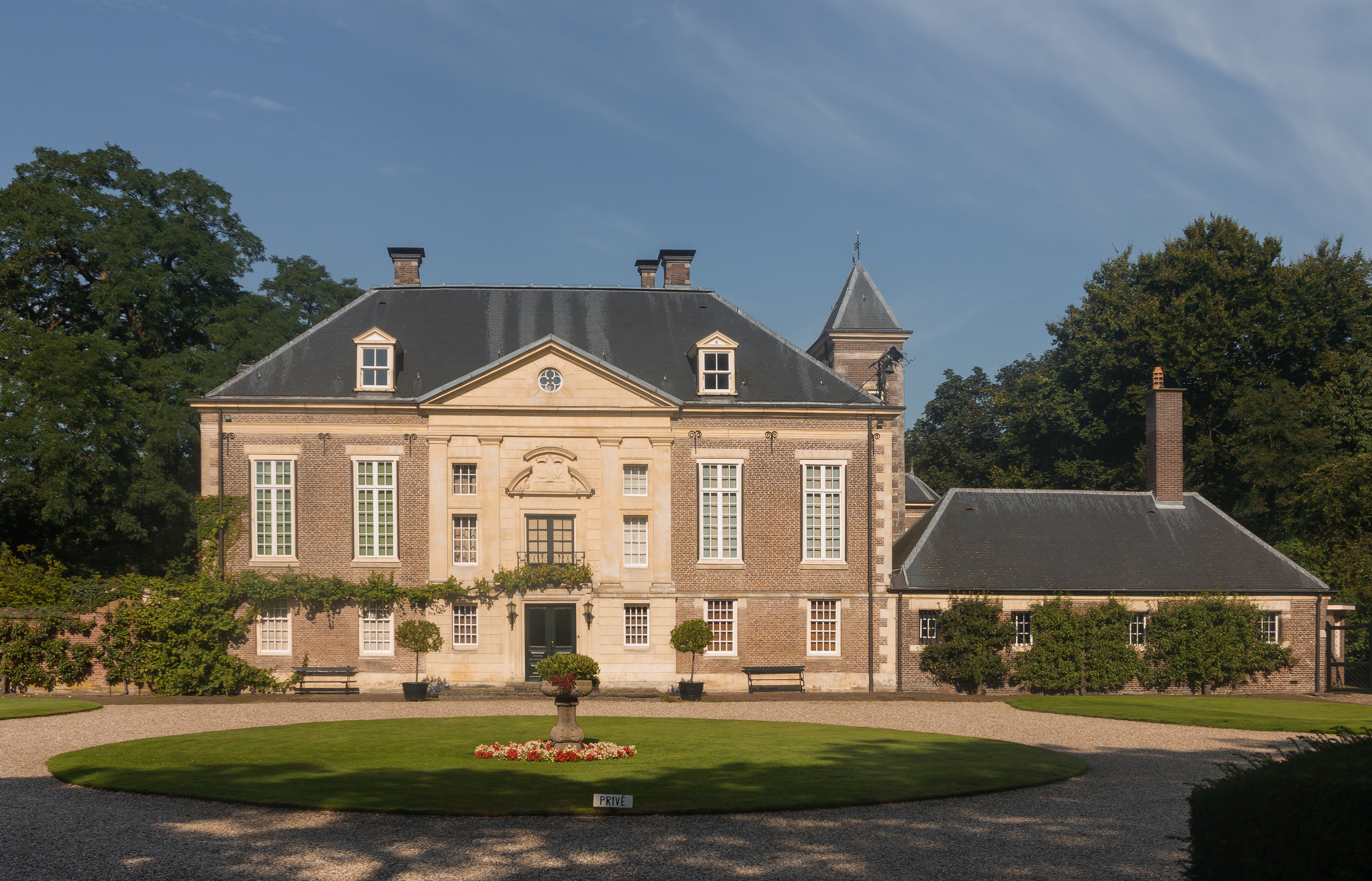
Diepenheim, country-house (Huize Diepenheim)

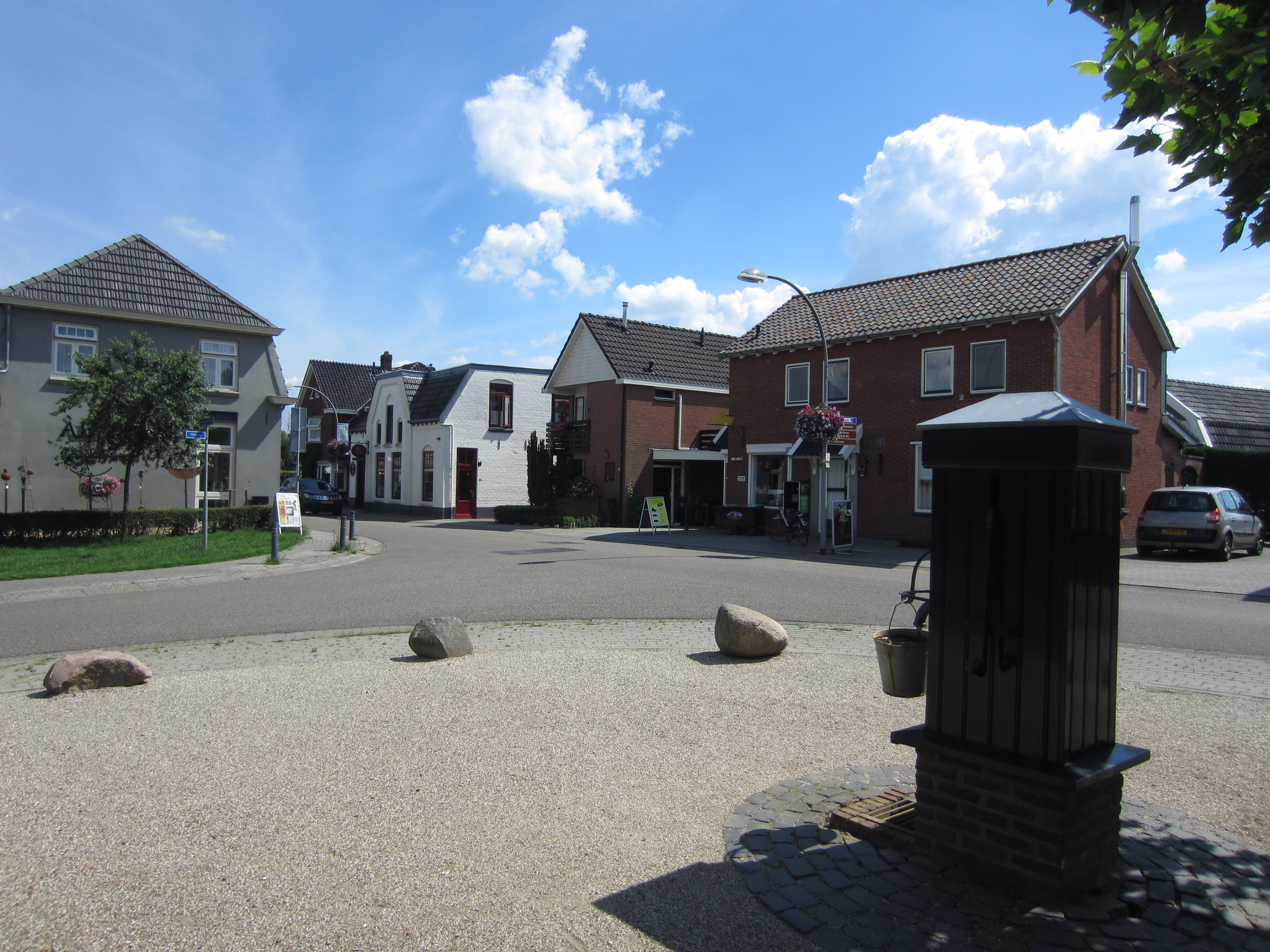
Water pump

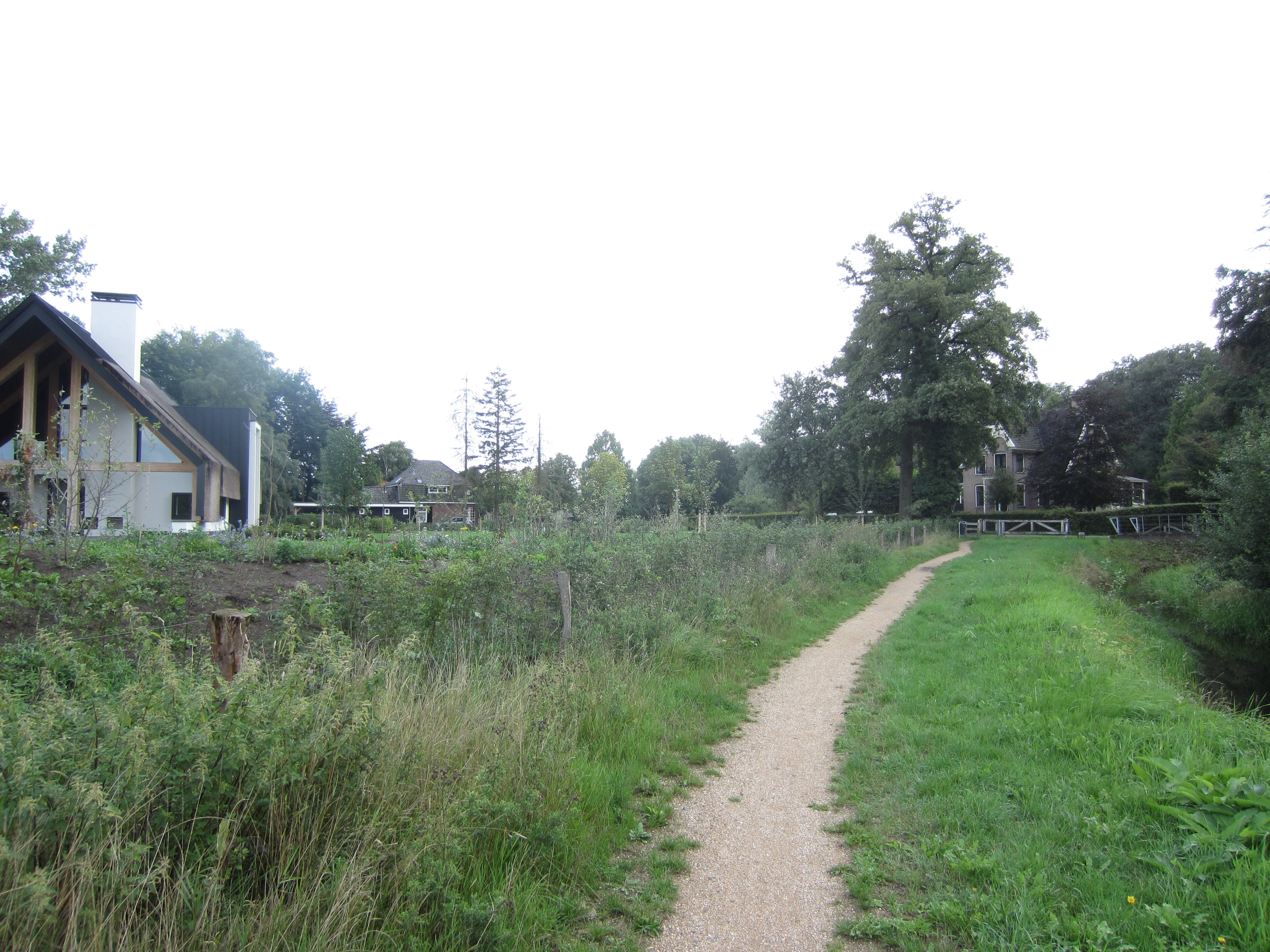
Path along the Regge
