= Hof van Twente =

- Municipality
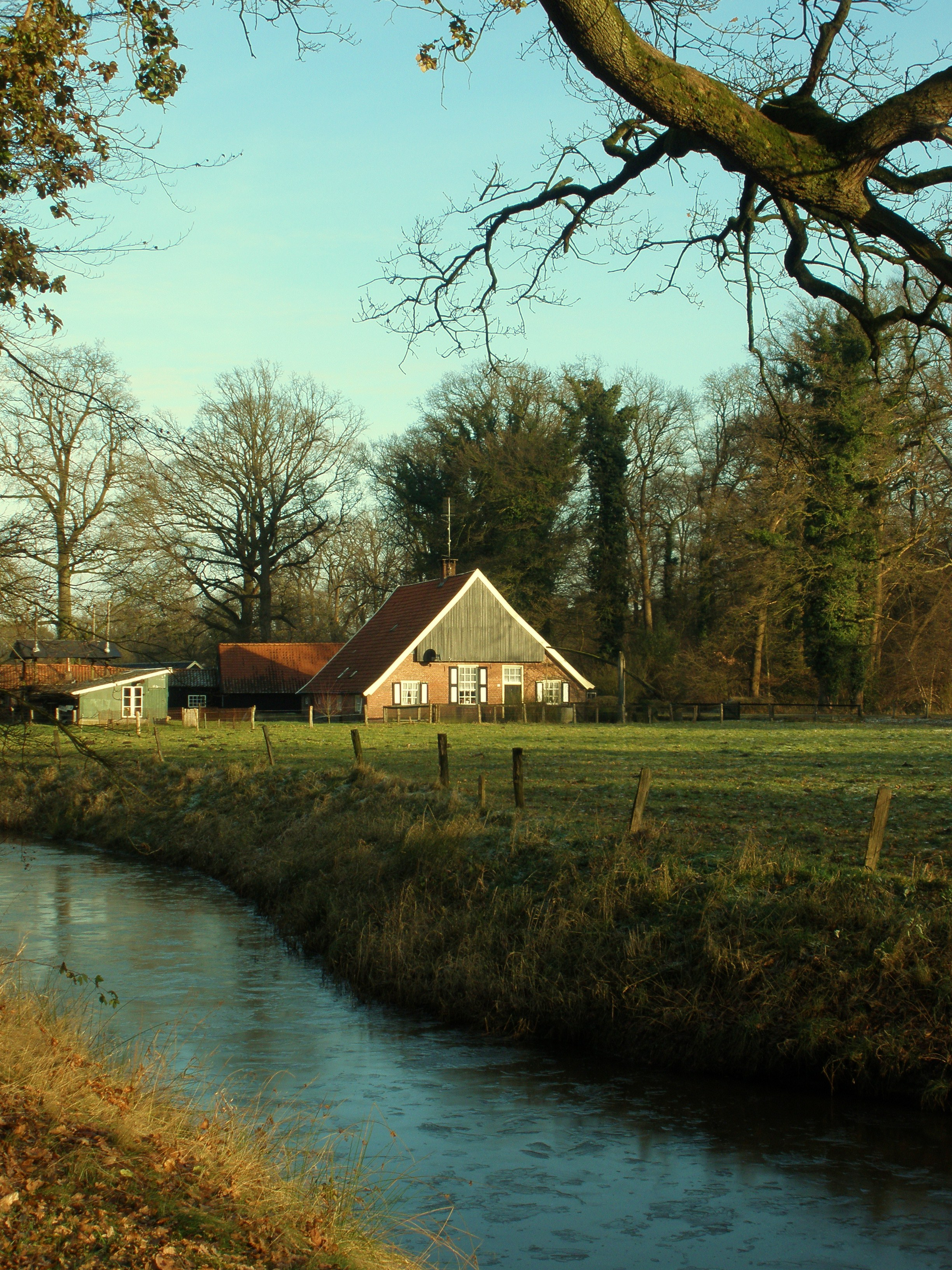
- Farmhouse in Deldeneresch

- Flag Coat of arms

- Location in Overijssel
- Coordinates: 52°14′N 6°35′E
- Country: Netherlands
- Province: Overijssel
- Established: 1 January 2001
- Seat: Goor

Government
  - Body: Municipal council
  - Mayor: Ellen Nauta (CDA)

Area
  - Total: 215.41 km^{2} (83.17 sq mi)
  - Land: 212.56 km^{2} (82.07 sq mi)
  - Water: 2.85 km^{2} (1.10 sq mi)
- Elevation: 12 m (39 ft)

Population (January 2021)
  - Total: 35,040
  - Density: 165/km^{2} (430/sq mi)
- Time zone: UTC+1 (CET)
  - Summer (DST): UTC+2 (CEST)
- Postcode: 7470–7479, 7490–7499
- Area code: 0547, 074
- Website: www.hofvantwente.nl

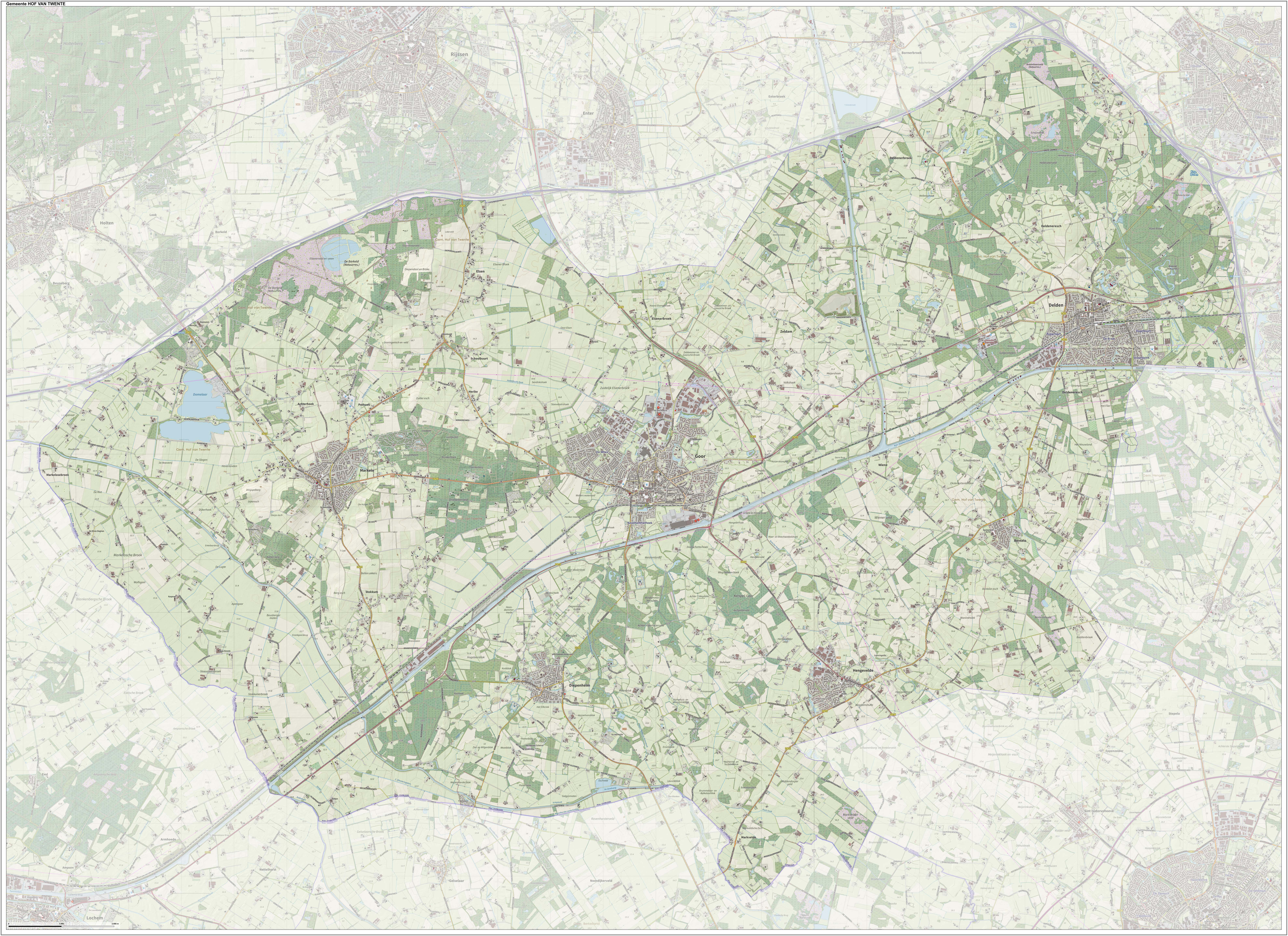
Dutch Topographic map of Hof van Twente, June 2015

Hof van Twente (Dutch pronunciation: [ˈɦɔ(f) fɑn ˈtʋɛntə]) is a municipality in the region Twente, in the province Overijssel in the eastern Netherlands. The municipality was established January 1, 2001, as the result of the merger of the municipalities of Diepenheim, Goor, Markelo, Ambt Delden, and Stad Delden.

== Population centers ==
The larger places are printed in bold types.

- Achterhoek near Markelo
- Azelo
- **Bentelo**
- **Delden**
- Deldenerbroek
- Deldeneresch
- **Diepenheim**
- Dijkerhoek
- Elsen and Elsenerbroek, near Markelo
- **Goor**, where the town hall is
- **Hengevelde**
- Herike near Markelo
- **Markelo**
- Markelosebroek
- Markvelde
- Pothoek, and Stokkum, near Markelo
- Stokkumerbroek near Markelo
- Wiene
- Zeldam

== History ==
Goor (Dutch for: low, swampy land) achieved city rights in 1263. However, it never became an important city. In the late Middle Ages, the "Drost" (a kind of mayor) of the Twente region, who ruled this area on behalf of the bishop of Utrecht, had his residence in Goor. In its surroundings some castles were built, among them the house of the important Heeckeren family in 1412. Goor had a small harbour along the river Regge (which flows to the Vecht near Ommen), but when the Twente canal was opened in 1936, a new industrial port was built there. The factory Eternit, that produces building materials containing asbestos, brought Goor unwillingly into trouble. For decades, everyone in Goor was permitted to use production refuse containing asbestos in order to pave their own paths and roads. Not earlier than about 1990, it was known in Goor that especially small particles of this material can cause cancer. In major parts of the city the soil had to be removed and either cleaned or replaced by non-polluted material.

Delden achieved its city rights in 1333. Its circle-shaped centre was surrounded by earthen walls. It came into existence thanks to the Twickel castle, situated less than one mile north of Delden. This castle, that in its present form dates from the 17th century, is still inhabited by a German noble family (Zu Castell - Rüdenhausen).

In 1886, near this castle, salt was discovered under the ground. This led to the exploration of this material, still going on in the nearby city of Hengelo.

In Markelo, prehistoric mounds "tumuli", containing graves have been excavated.

== Economy ==
Hof van Twente is situated in the heart of the province Overijssel: south-west of Almelo, north-east of the Achterhoek region (Prov. Gelderland) and south-east of Rijssen-Holten.

The small cities of Goor and Delden have some important industry (cement, metallics, plastics). Goor has a small harbour along the Twente Canal (Zutphen - Enschede). Permess International is one of the world's leading producers of high-quality interlinings offering a complete range of products for the textile and allied industries.

The motorway A35 has a junction between Delden and Hengelo (distance to both towns 2 km).

Agriculture and tourism (see below) are of economic importance as well.

Railway Zutphen to Oldenzaal (line 73): Zutphen - Lochem - Goor (mun. Hof van Twente) - Delden (ditto) - Hengelo - Oldenzaal.

== Sights ==
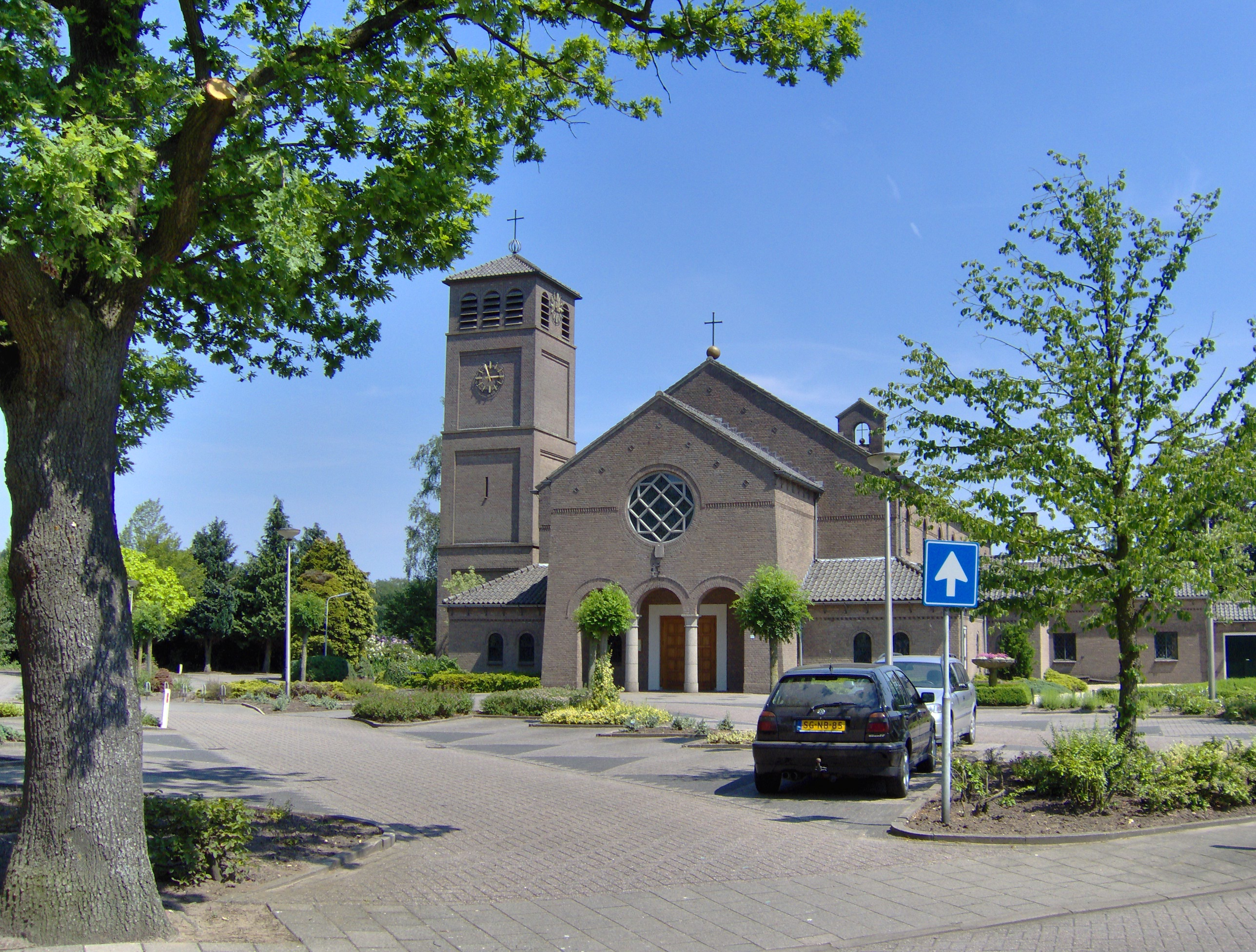
Bentelo village

- All through the Hof van Twente ("Garden of Twente") it is possible to wander around on foot or bicycle. The municipality has many small woods, old water mills, country houses, small castles with their parks, and small lanes through the countryside. Therefore, many tourists visit this rural area. They stay in small hotels, holiday resorts, on camping sites and even at farms.
- The Twickel castle near Delden can only be observed from the outside, but most of its parks and woods (60 square km) are freely accessible.
- Castle Warmelo near Diepenheim, that was built in 1315, and was afterwards devastated and rebuilt several times, is in private use as well. Princess Armgard, the mother of Prince Bernhard of Lippe-Biesterfeld, who was Queen Juliana's husband, lived there until her death in 1971. Its famous gardens are open to the public every summer.
- Castle Weldam, between Markelo and Goor, is inhabited by the German noble family of Zu Solms-Sonnenwalde. The beautiful gardens of this castle can be visited. Castle's forest is freely accessible as well.
- In Delden you can visit the Gothic Saint Blasius Church (built in the 15th century).
- Delden has the Dutch Salt Museum (Zoutmuseum), about salt, its history, use and mining.

== Notable people ==
=== Public thinking & public service ===
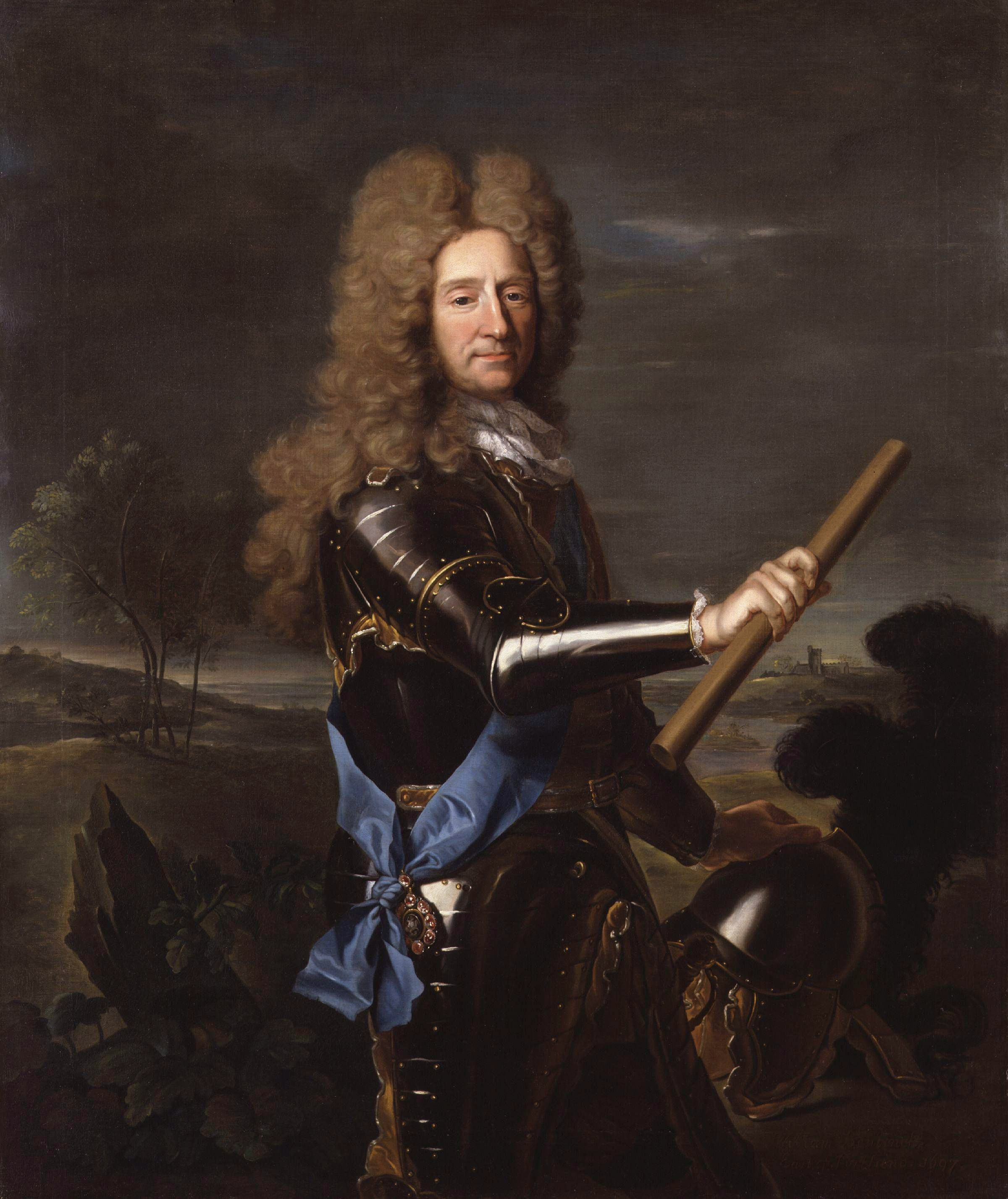
William Bentinck, 1st Earl of Portland

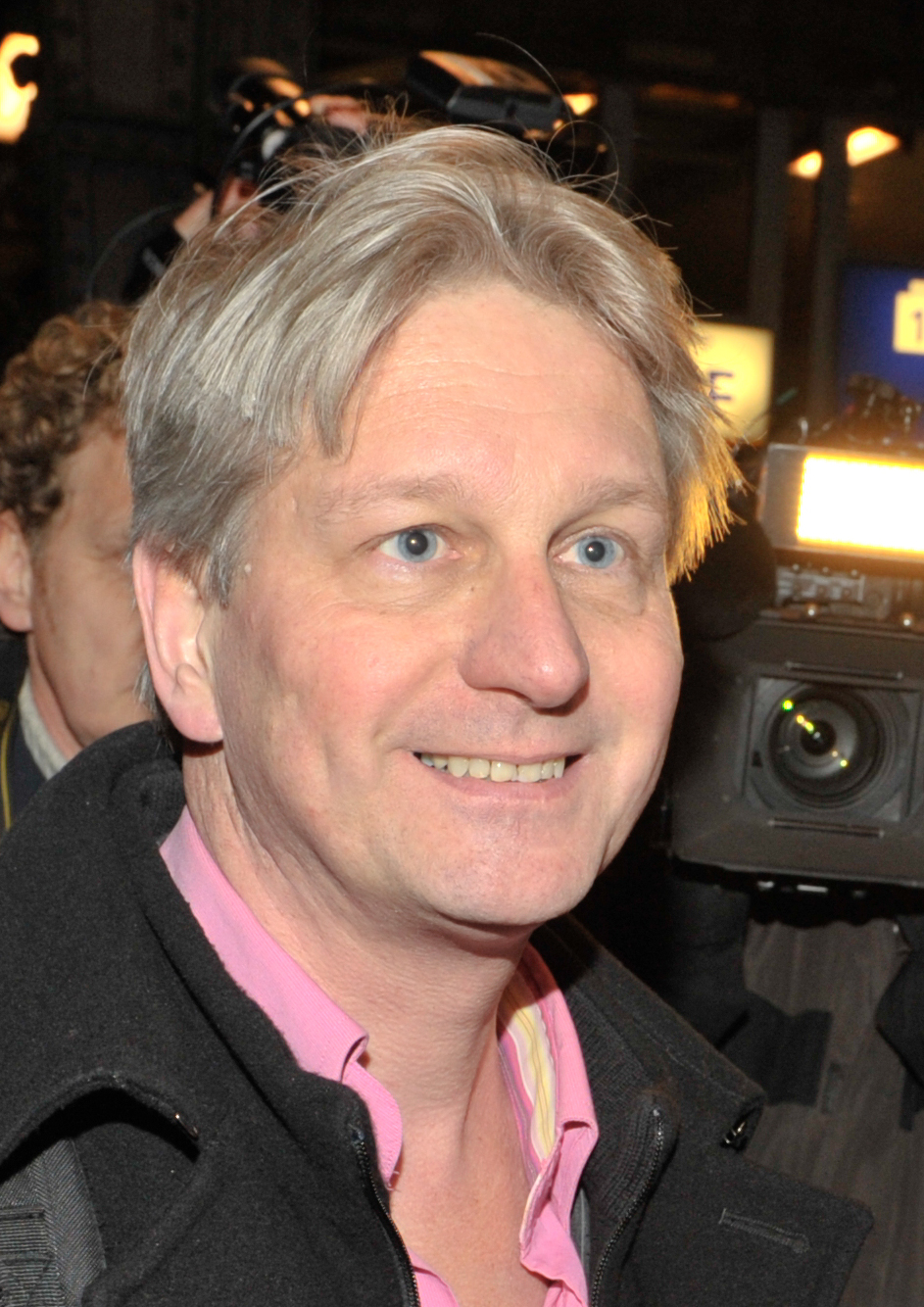
Wijnand Duyvendak, 2009

- Maria van Beckum (before 1510 in Markelo – 1544) a Dutch noblewoman and Anabaptist executed for heresy
- William Bentinck, 1st Earl of Portland KG, PC (1649 in Diepenheim – 1709) a Dutch and English nobleman
- Unico Wilhelm, Count van Wassenaer Obdam (1692 in Delden - 1766) was a Dutch nobleman, diplomat and composer
- Klaas Annink (1710 in Bentelo – 1775) a notorious Dutch serial killer in Twente
- Jean Pierre Moquette (1856 in Goor – 1927) a bookkeeper in Sidoarjo and stamp and coin dealer in Surabaya in the Dutch East Indies
- Henk van Dongen (1936 in Delden – 2011) an organizational theorist, policy advisor and academic
- Simon C. Dik (1940 in Delden – 1995) a linguist, developed the theory of functional grammar
- Henk Kamp (born 1952 in Hengelo) a retired Dutch politician
- Annie Schreijer-Pierik (born 1953 in Diepenheim) a Dutch politician and Member of the European Parliament
- Wijnand Duyvendak (born 1957 in Markelo) a former Dutch politician

=== The arts ===
- Rutger Kopland (1934 in Goor – 2012) a Dutch poet
- Hannie Rouweler (born 1951 in Goor) a Dutch poet
- Tommy Wieringa (born 1967 in Goor) a Dutch writer
- Lodewijk Fluttert (born 1991 in Markelo) known as Bakermat, is a Dutch DJ and music producer

=== Sport ===
- Erik Cent (born 1962 in Goor) a track cyclist, competed in the 1988 and 1992 Summer Olympics
- Moniek Kleinsman (born 1982 in Bentelo) a Dutch speed skater, competed at the 2006 Winter Olympics
- Hinkelien Schreuder (born 1984 in Goor) a butterfly, freestyle and backstroke swimmer, gold medallist at the 2008 Summer Olympics and bronze medallist at the 2012 Summer Olympics
- Ellen Jansen (born 1992 in Markelo) a Dutch female international footballer

== Gallery ==
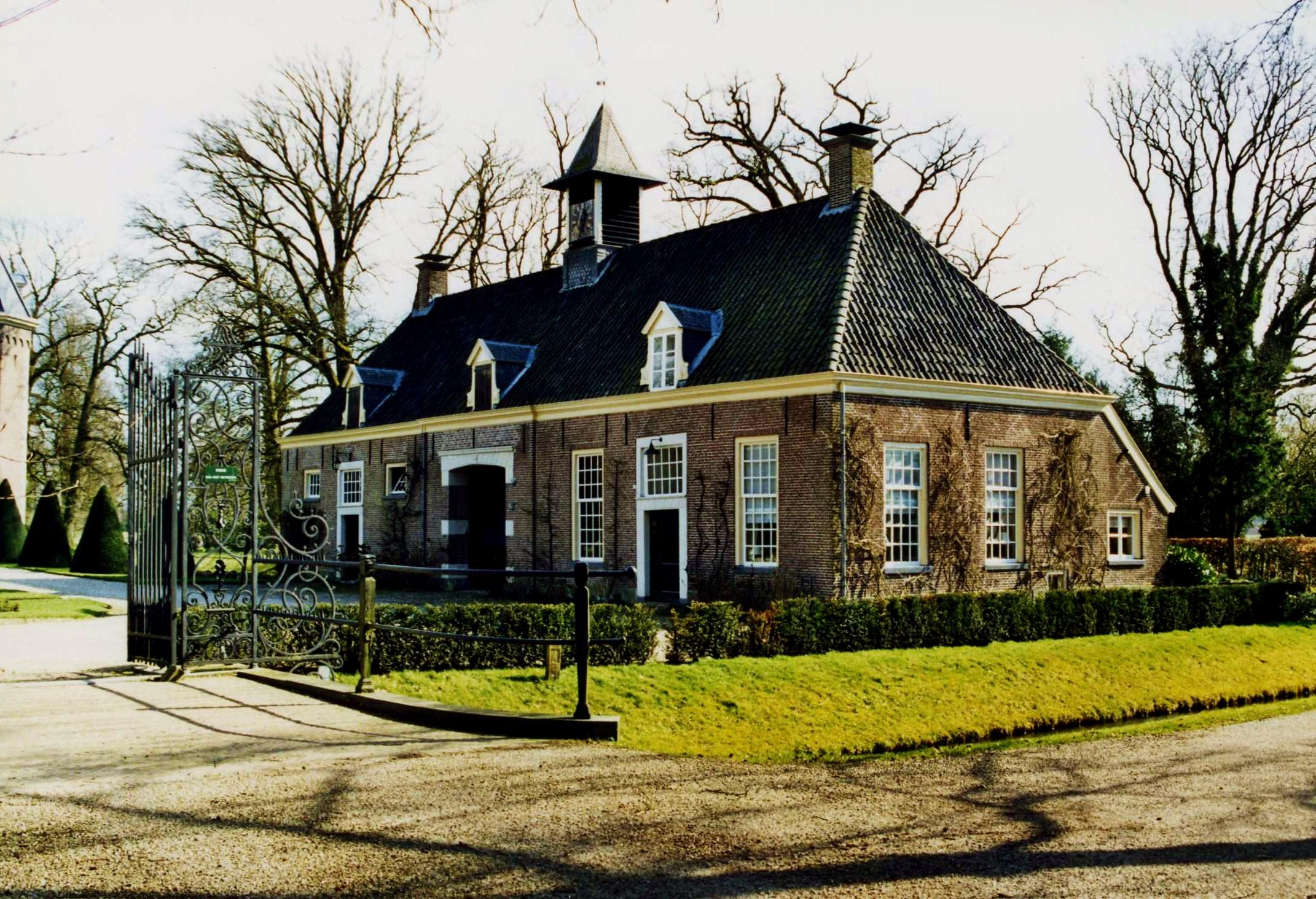
Nijenhuis koetshuis

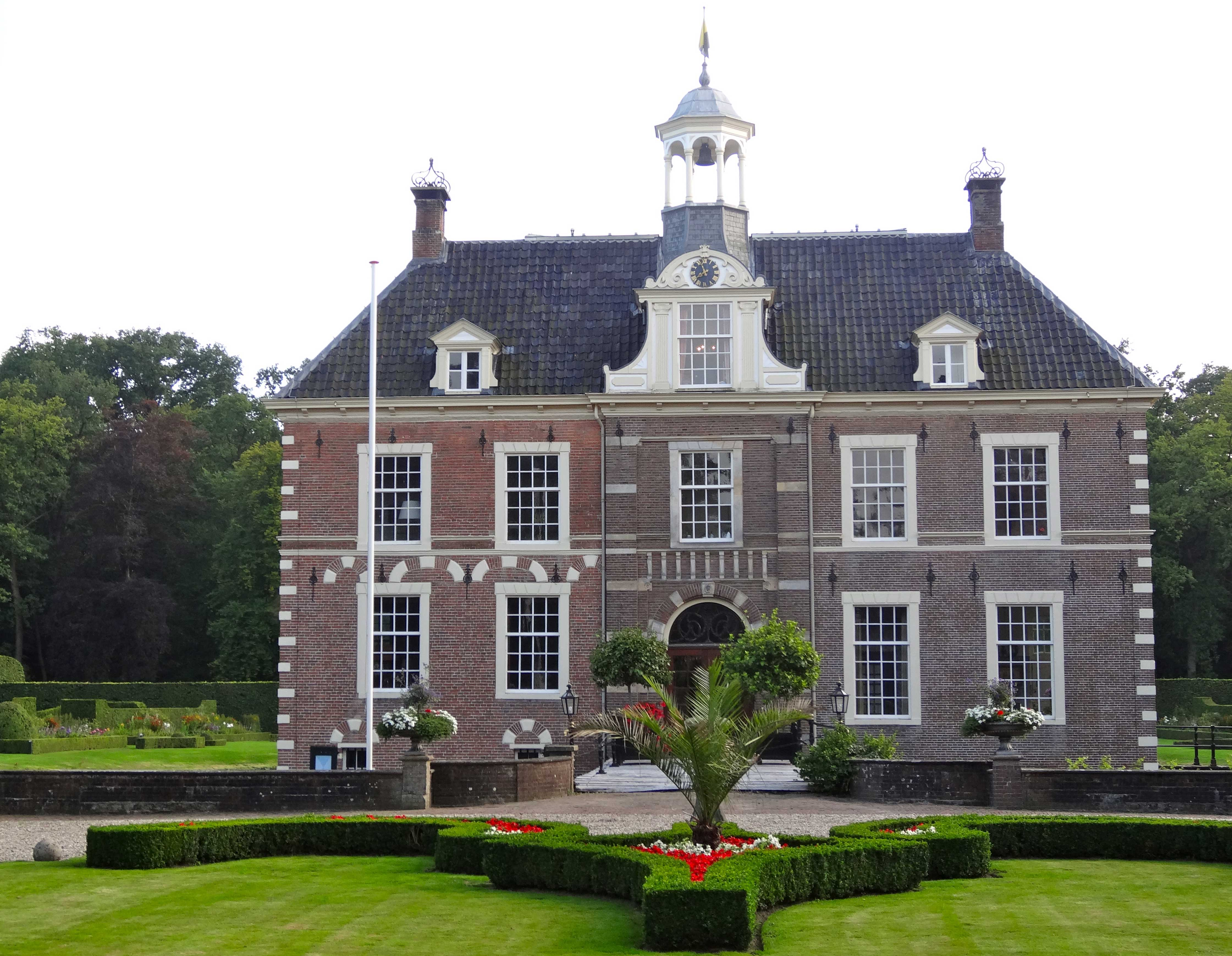
Huize Warmelo

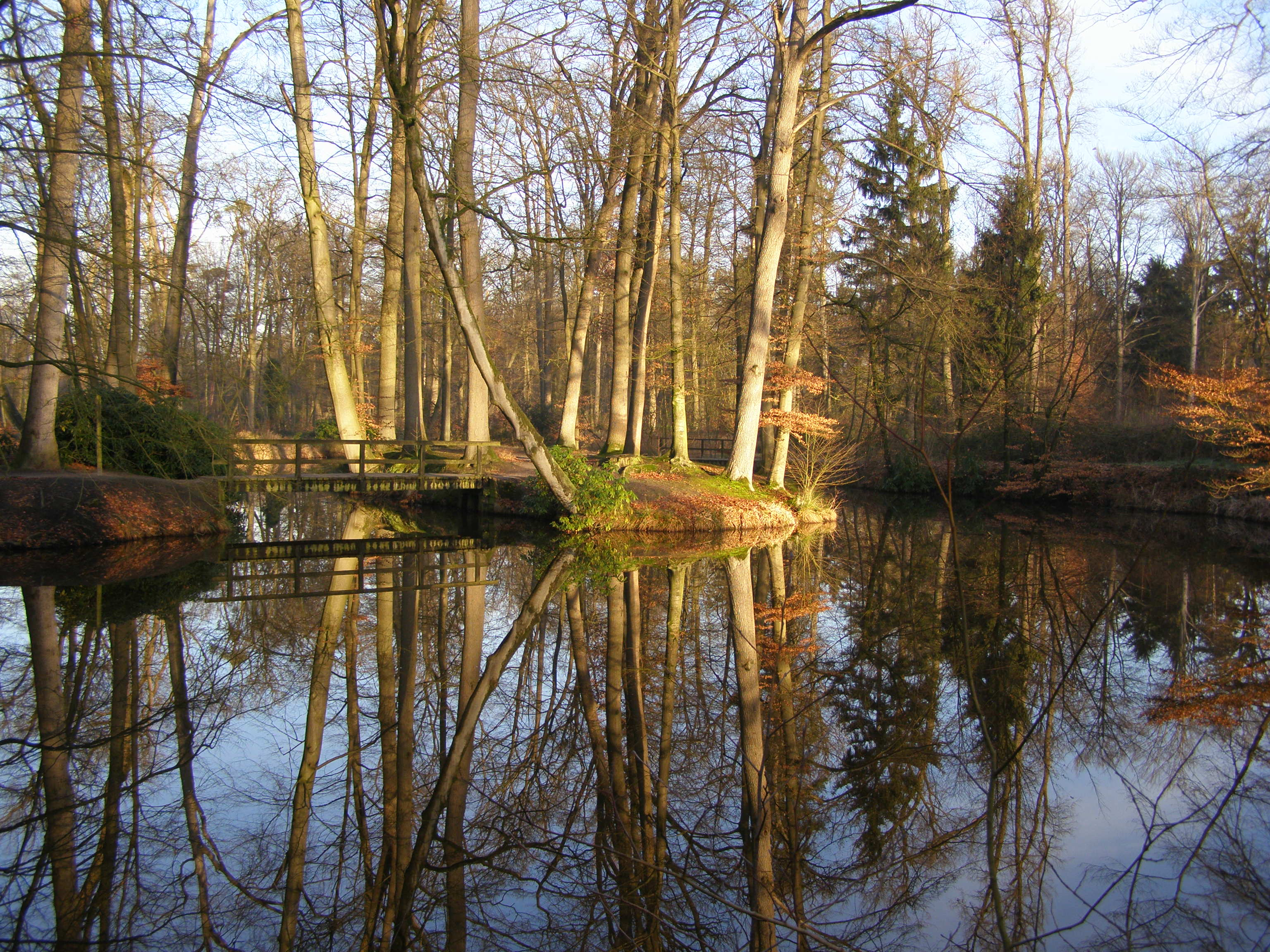
Oelerbeek bij de bruggetjes van Twickel

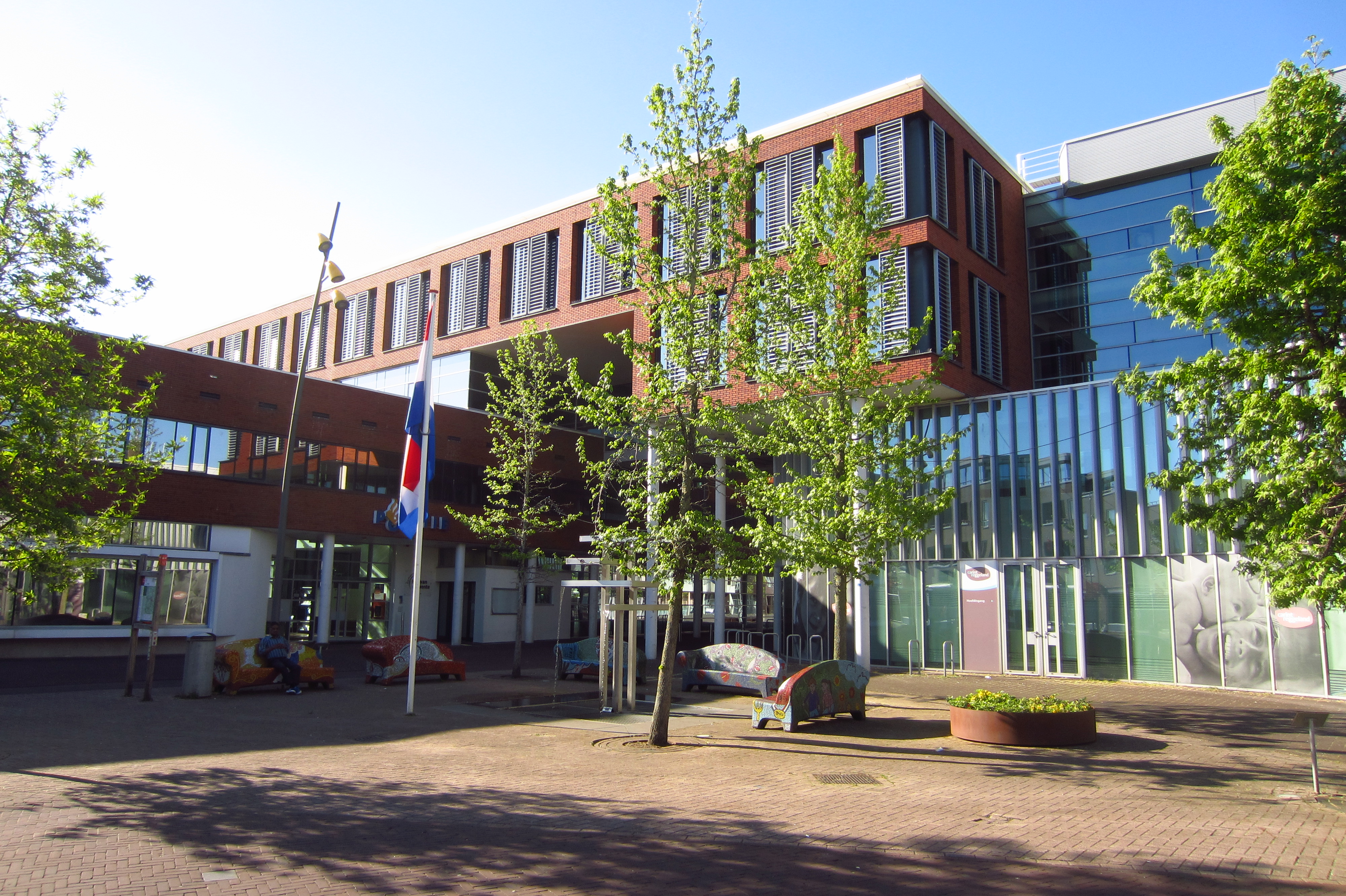
Goor pleintje bij gemeentehuis
