= Achterhoek, Overijssel =

Markvelde
- Hamlet
- Location in province of Overijssel in the Netherlands Markvelde (Netherlands)
- Coordinates: 52.24662°N 6.48645°E
- Country: Netherlands
- Province: Overijssel
- Municipality: Hof van Twente
- Elevation: 18 m (59 ft)
- Time zone: UTC+1 (CET)
  - Summer (DST): UTC+2 (CEST)
- Postal code: 7475
- Dialing code: 0547

Achterhoek (Dutch pronunciation: [ˈɑxtərɦuk]) is a hamlet in the Dutch province of Overijssel. It is located in the municipality of Hof van Twente, about 2 km northwest of the village Markelo.

Achter is not a statistical entity, and the postal authorities have placed it under Markelo. It was first mentioned in 1867 as Achterhoek, and means "far away place". The hamlet consists of about 30 houses. Until 2001, Achterhoek was a part of the municipality of Markelo.
