= Goor =

- City
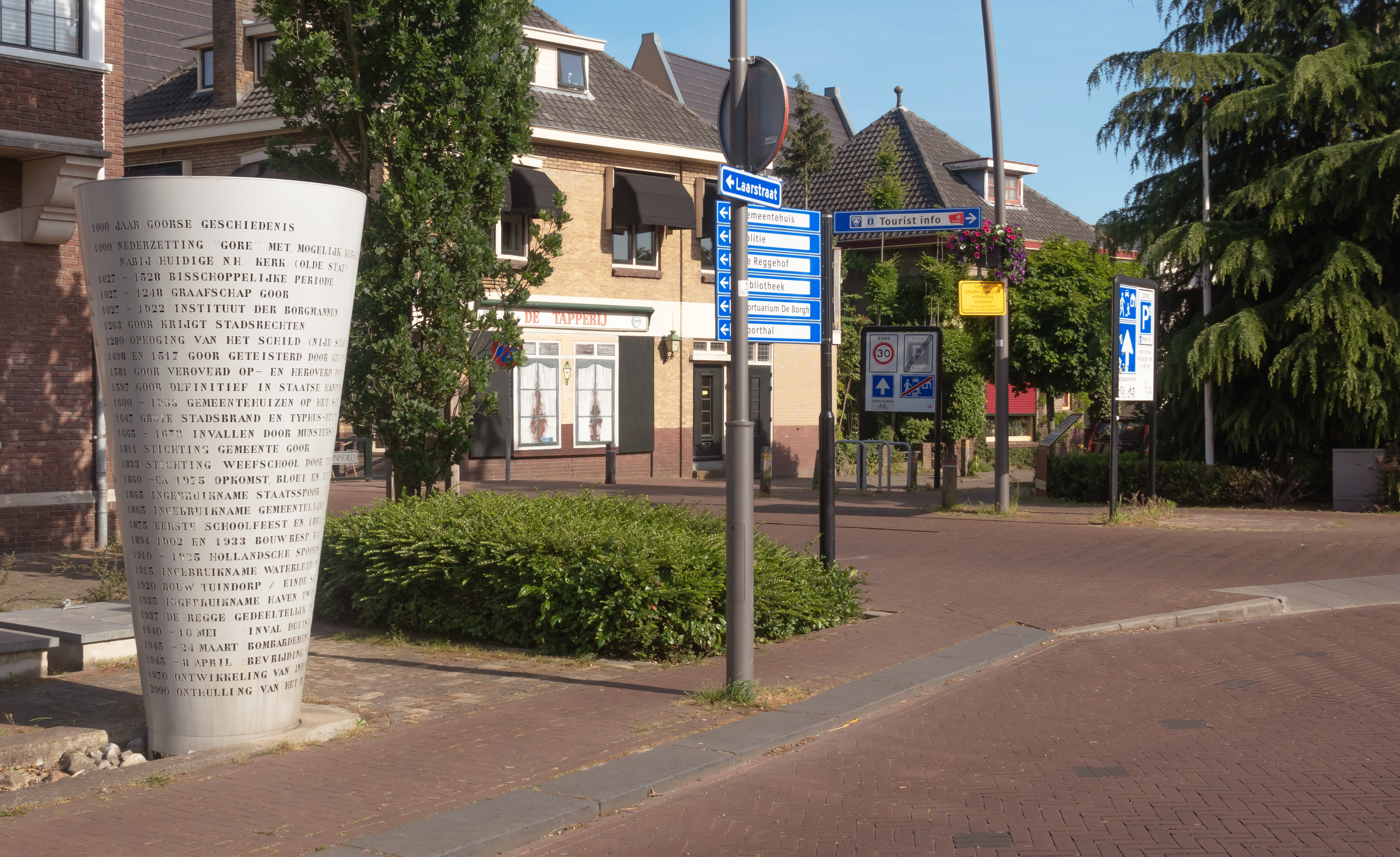
- Sculpture: the history of Goor

- Flag Coat of arms

- Location in province of Overijssel in the Netherlands Goor (Netherlands)
- Coordinates: 52°13′56″N 6°35′12″E
- Country: Netherlands
- Province: Overijssel
- Municipality: Hof van Twente

Area
  - Total: 19.49 km^{2} (7.53 sq mi)
- Elevation: 12 m (39 ft)

Population (2021)
  - Total: 12,155
  - Density: 623.7/km^{2} (1,615/sq mi)
- Time zone: UTC+1 (CET)
  - Summer (DST): UTC+2 (CEST)
- Postal code: 7471
- Dialing code: 0547

Goor (pronounced [ɣoːr]) is a city in the Dutch province of Overijssel. It is located about 20 kilometres (12 mi) west of Enschede. Goor received city rights in 1263.

Goor was a separate municipality until 2001, when it became part of Hof van Twente. Goor had a statue of Joan Derk van der Capellen tot den Pol, but it was destroyed in 1787 by royalist Orangists in the defeat of the republican movement.

== Jewish community ==
While records of individual Jews in Goor date back to the 14th century, the first permanent records of a Jewish community date to the 1600s when residence permits were issued to Jews.

The Joodse begraafplaats ('Jewish cemetery') of Goor on the Borghoek dates to 1720. The Jewish population expanded rapidly in the second half of the 18th century. In 1748, Goor had 13 Jewish residents; that number increased to 238 Jews by 1809. In 1821, the Jews of Goor joined with Jews living in the neighboring towns of Diepenheim and Markelo to build the Ringsynagoge ('regional synagogue').

The Jewish community thrived throughout the 19th and early 20th centuries. Jews contributed to the economic development of Goor and the Twente region. The Jewish Lavino brothers set up a weaving school in Goor. Godfried Salomonson (1838–1911), a Jewish man, established the "Koninklijke Stoomweverij te Nijverdal" ('the Royal Nijverdal Steam Bleaching Works') (Note: Nijverdal means "industrious valley" in Dutch.) in 1836 with the express purpose of serving as the center of the Dutch Industrial Revolution. In 1902, a new synagogue on Schoolstraat replaced the old Ringsynagoge.

During the Second World War, nearly the entire Jewish community was openly murdered or sent to concentration camps where they were killed. The synagogue was damaged in air raids, and pulled down after the war. The Jewish cemetery has a monument to the murdered Jews, and was named a national monument in 1970.

== Transportation ==
Railway Station: Goor

== Notable people from Goor ==
- Erik Cent (1962), cyclist
- Rutger Kopland (1934–2012), poet
- Tommy Wieringa (born 1964), writer
- Jelle Klaasen (born 1984), darts player
- Renée Luth (born 1979), poet
- Hannie Rouweler (born 1951), poet
- Peter Veenhuizen (born 1964), orchestra conductor and composer
- Hinkelien Schreuder (born 1984), swimmer

== Gallery ==
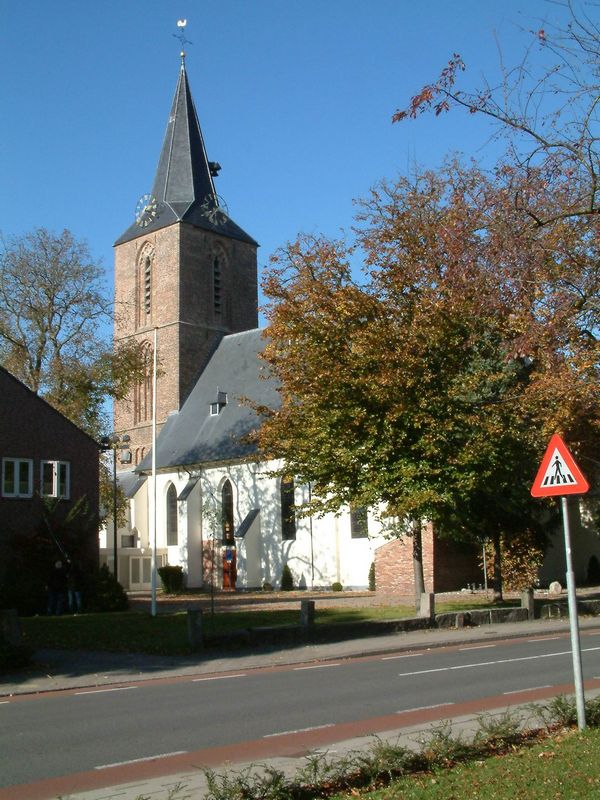
Goor, church: Hofkerk

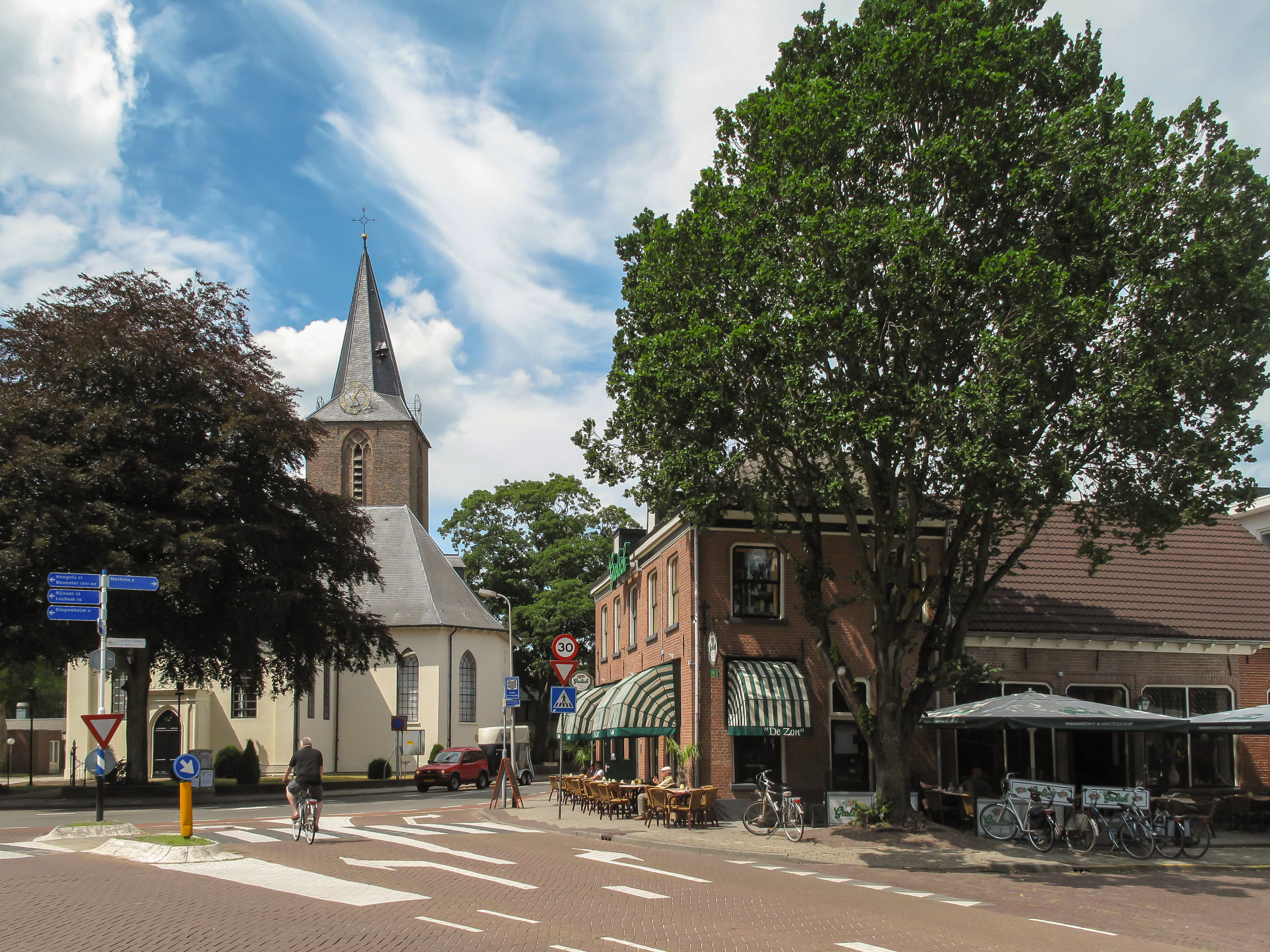
Goor, Hofkerk in the street

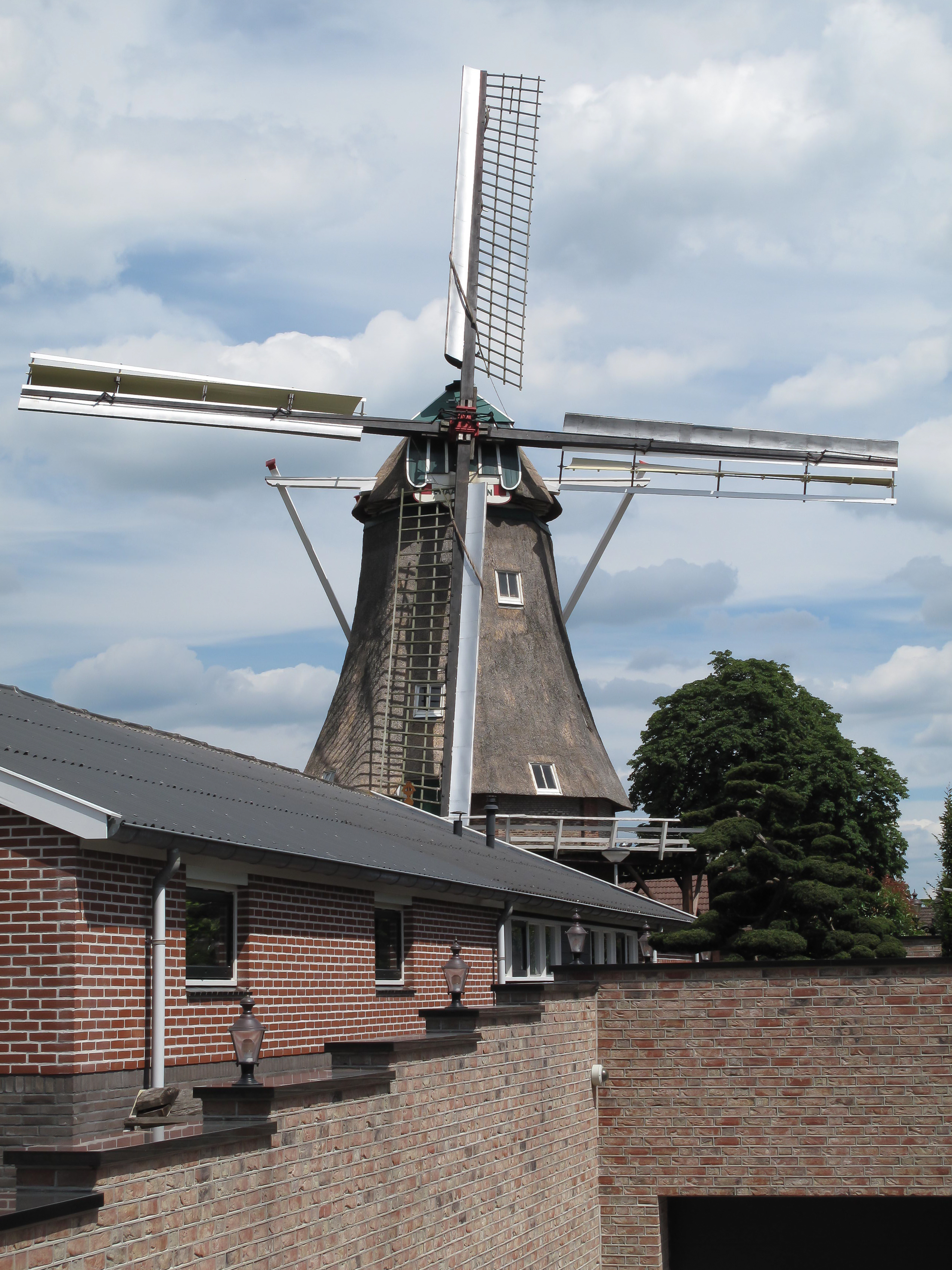
Goor, windmill: Braakmolen
