= Markvelde =

- Hamlet
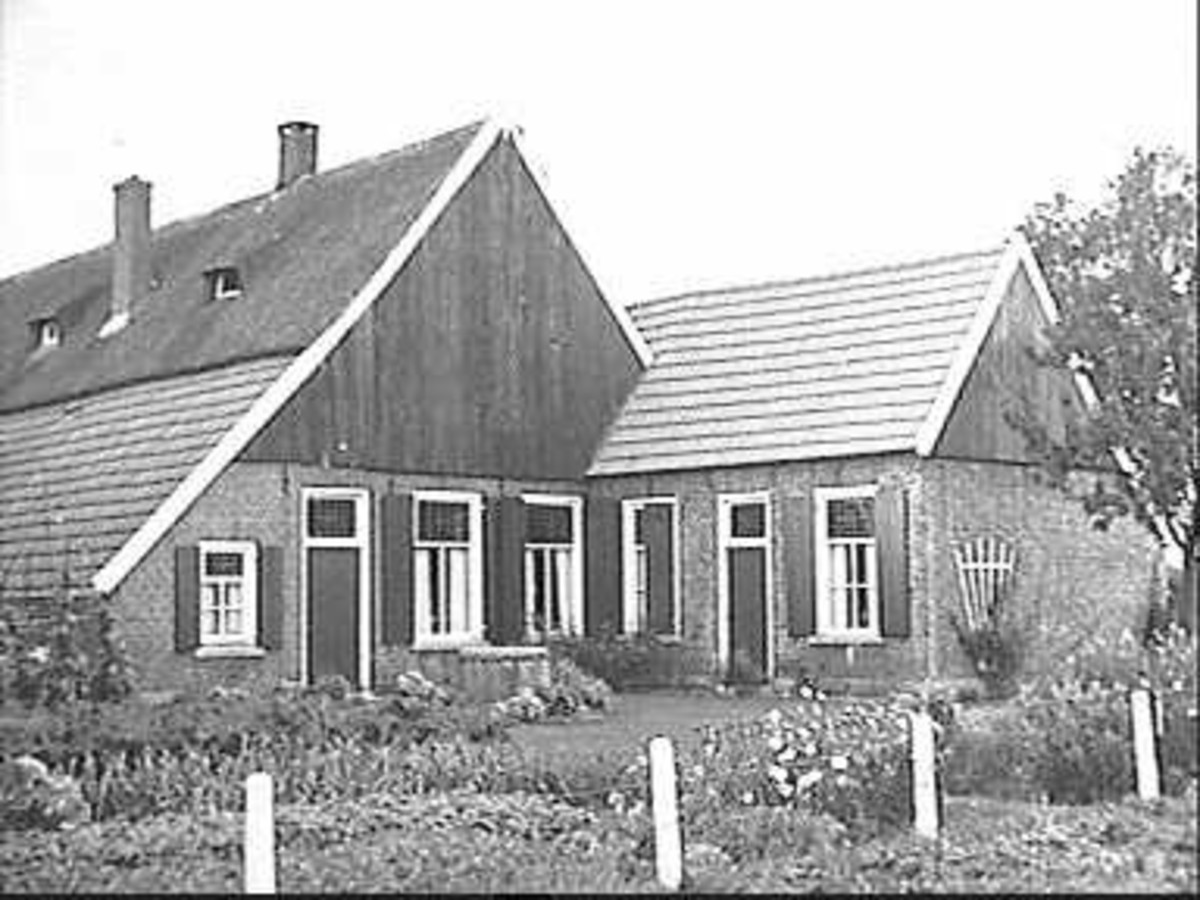
- Farm in Markvelde

- Location in province of Overijssel in the Netherlands Markvelde (Netherlands)
- Coordinates: 52.17202°N 6.60681°E
- Country: Netherlands
- Province: Overijssel
- Municipality: Hof van Twente

Area
  - Total: 9.21 km^{2} (3.56 sq mi)
- Elevation: 13 m (43 ft)

Population (2021)
  - Total: 275
  - Density: 29.9/km^{2} (77.3/sq mi)
- Time zone: UTC+1 (CET)
  - Summer (DST): UTC+2 (CEST)
- Postal code: 7478
- Dialing code: 0547

Markvelde is a hamlet in the eastern Netherlands. It is located in the municipality Hof van Twente, Overijssel. Until 2001, Markvelde was in the former municipality of Diepenheim. A part of the hamlet is in Berkelland, Gelderland.

Markvelde is a statistical entity, but the postal authorities have placed it under Diepenheim. It was first mentioned in 1225 as Marcvelthe, and means "field near communal ground".

In 1840, it was home to 190 people.

Markvelde includes a community center, and a number of hog and cattle farms. The school closed in 2018.
