= Klaas Annink =

Dutch serial killer

- Born: Klaas Annink; 18 June 1710; Bentelo, Dutch Republic
- Died: 13 September 1775 (aged 65); Twente, Netherlands
- Cause of death: Execution
- Other name: Huttenkloas
- Penalty: Death

Details
- Victims: 1 confirmed and suspected of another 5+
- Span of crimes: 1770–1774
- Country: Netherlands
- State: Twente
- Date apprehended: 1774

Klaas Annink (18 June 1710 – 13 September 1775), better known as Huttenkloas, was a Dutch murderer and suspected serial killer in Twente, Dutch Republic. Records of his life frequently mention that he was born in Bentelo.

He was reputedly responsible, together with his wife Aarne Spanjers and his son, Jannes, for numerous robberies and murders in the region in and around Hengevelde.

In 1774, a merchant from Hanover investigated and found convincing evidence that Annink was responsible for the disappearance and murder of one of his family members. Huttenkloas was then arrested and held for 114 days in a specially-made chair. Following a controversial trial, he and his wife were sentenced to death and executed.

The seat in which Klaas Annink sat, known as the "Chair of Huttenkloas", is still on display in the Ancient Chamber room in the Palthehuis Museum in Oldenzaal.

Klaas Annink's infamous nickname, Huttenkloas, has not been forgotten, having been adopted by a local brewery. The company Hengelose Huttenkloas B.V. has outlets in Twente, Salland, Drenthe, Achterhoek, selling Huttenkloas beer. Also, in 2009, the Dutch accordion player and singer Alexander Schoemaker released a CD about Twente's legends, including the ballad de ballade van Hutnkloas.

== See also ==
- List of serial killers by country
