= Bentelo =

Bentelo Beantel
- Village
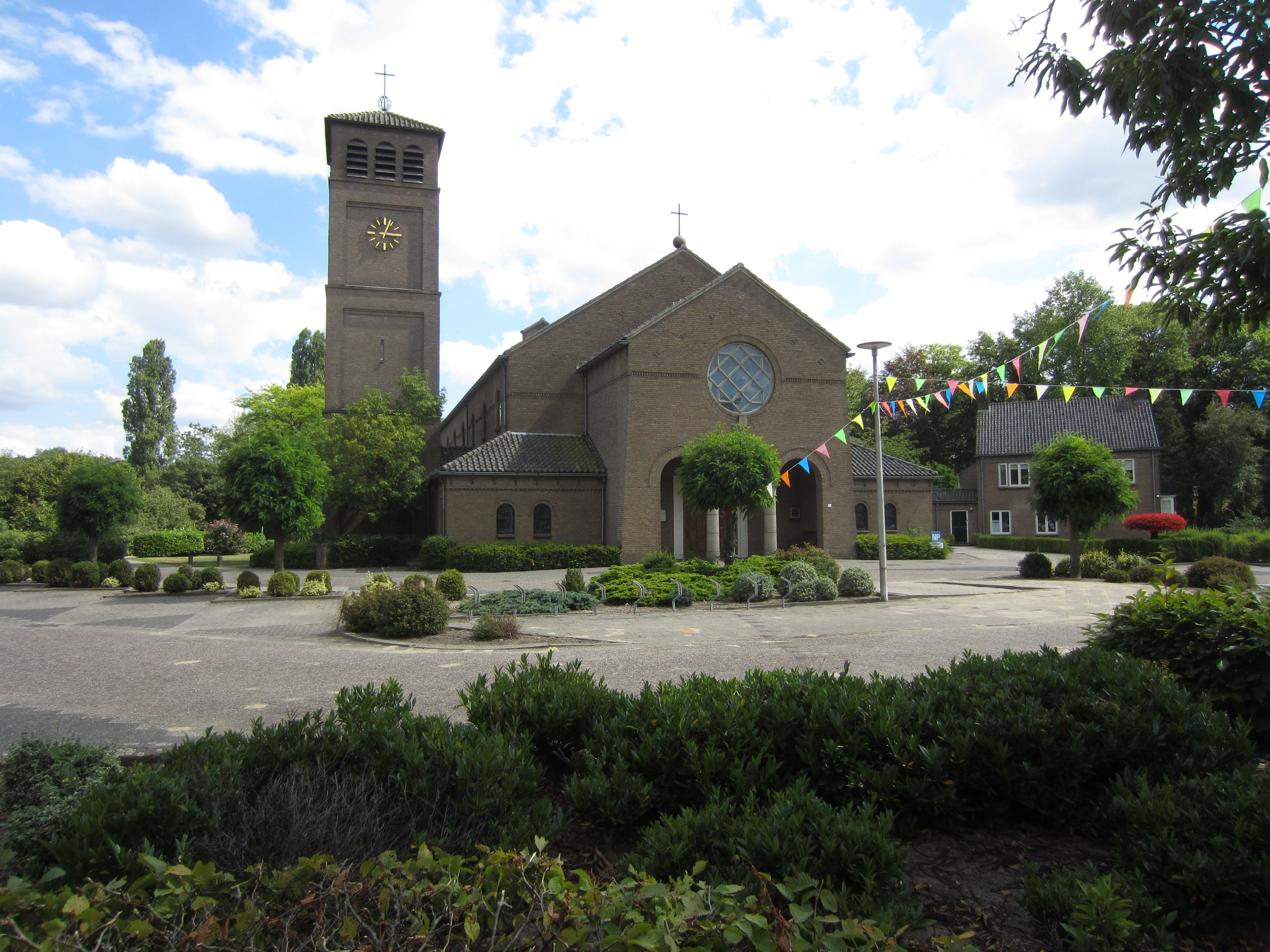
- Church in Bentelo

- Flag

- Location in province of Overijssel in the Netherlands Bentelo (Netherlands)
- Coordinates: 52°13′29″N 6°41′2″E
- Country: Netherlands
- Province: Overijssel
- Municipality: Hof van Twente

Area
  - Total: 29.42 km^{2} (11.36 sq mi)
- Elevation: 17 m (56 ft)

Population (2021)
  - Total: 2,205
  - Density: 74.95/km^{2} (194.1/sq mi)
- Time zone: UTC+1 (CET)
  - Summer (DST): UTC+2 (CEST)
- Postal code: 7495 & 7497
- Dialing code: 0547

Bentelo (Low German: Beantel) is a farming village in the Dutch municipality Hof van Twente.

== Overview ==
It was first mentioned in 1188 as Benlo. The etymology is unclear. Bentelo started to develop after World War II. The Catholic church was completed in 1954. In 1840, it was home to 504 people.

The village is a centre for intensive cattle farming. Bentelo has a large vineyard in the Netherlands, as well as several Asparagus growers.

== Notable people ==
- Klaas Annink (Huttenkloas) (1710–1775), criminal from Twente. Place of birth is disputed
- Moniek Kleinsman (born 1982), speed skater

== Gallery ==
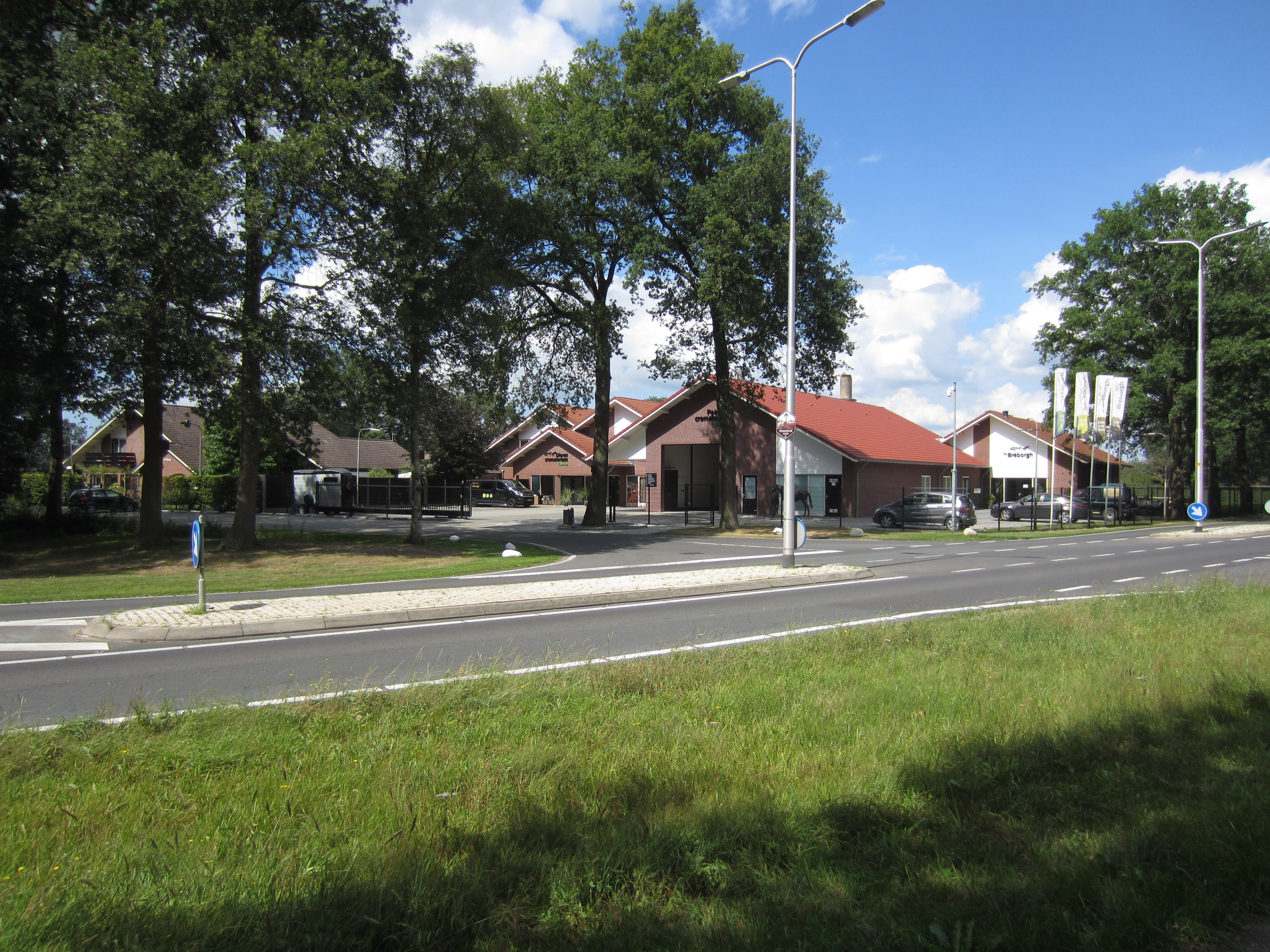
Pet hotel

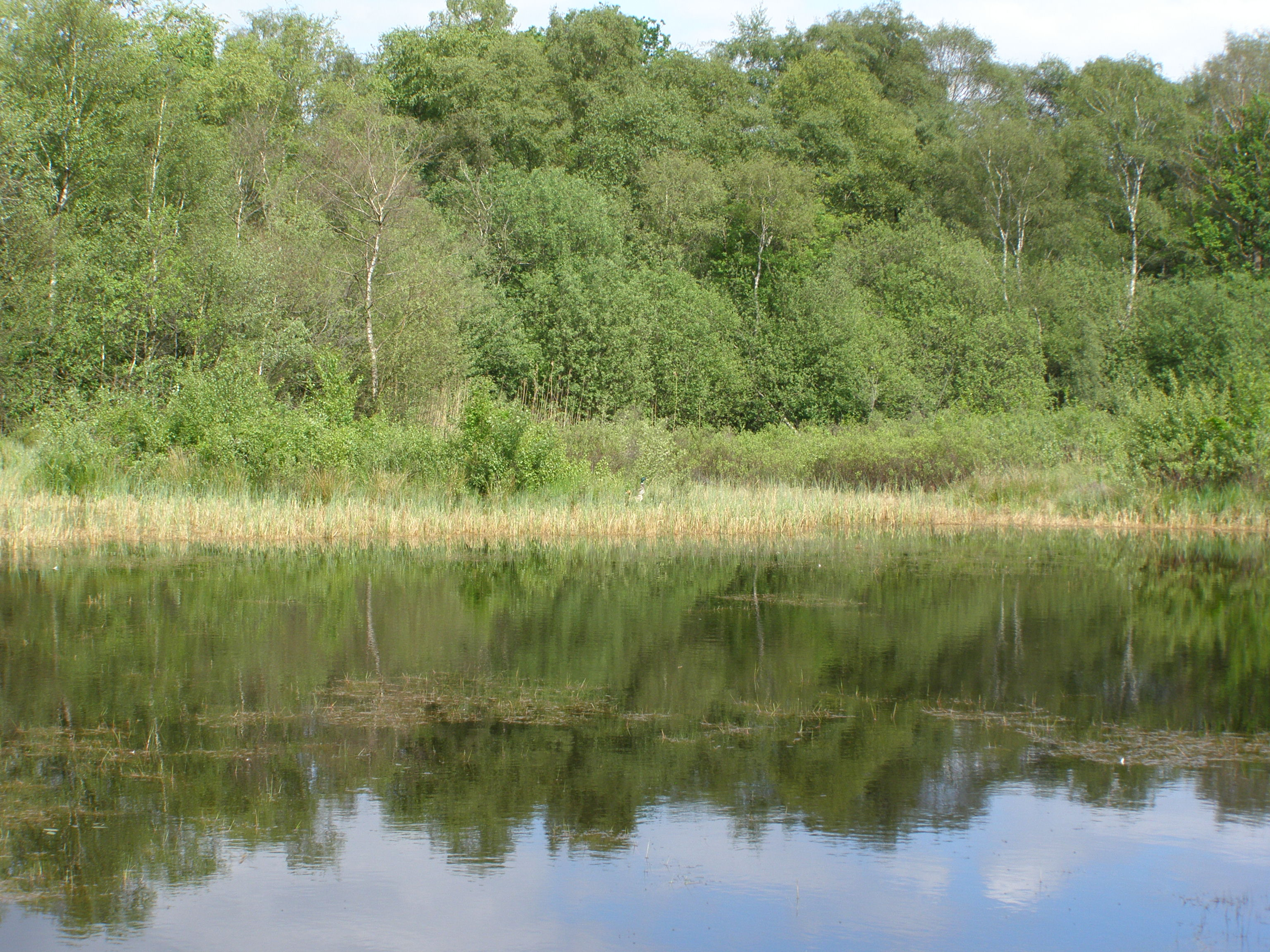
The Boddenbroek
