= Hengevelde =

- Village
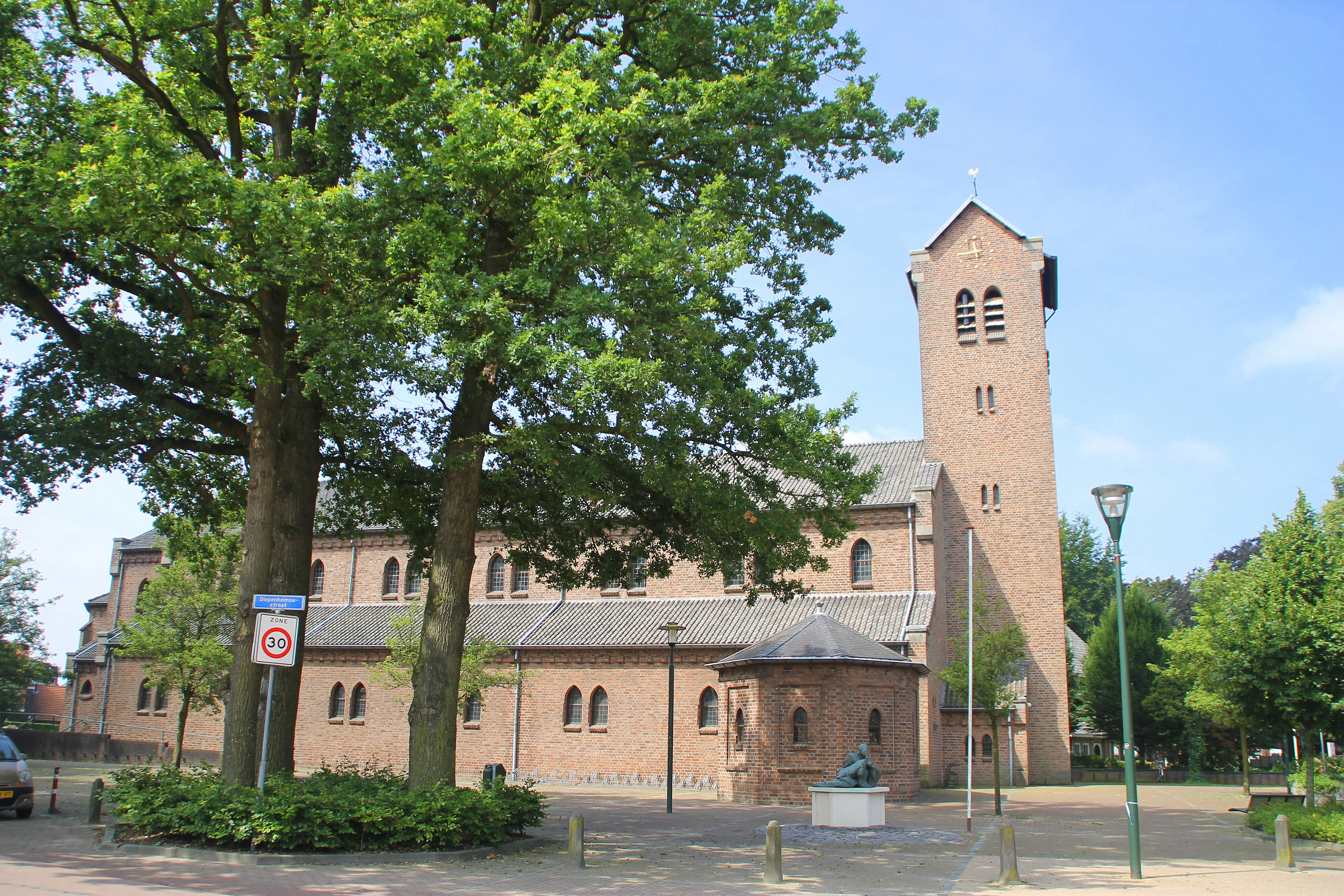
- Church of Hengevelde

- Location in province of Overijssel in the Netherlands Hengevelde (Netherlands)
- Coordinates: 52°12′N 6°38′E
- Country: Netherlands
- Province: Overijssel
- Municipality: Hof van Twente

Area
  - Total: 53.98 km^{2} (20.84 sq mi)
- Elevation: 15 m (49 ft)

Population (2021)
  - Total: 3,410
  - Density: 63.2/km^{2} (164/sq mi)
- Time zone: UTC+1 (CET)
  - Summer (DST): UTC+2 (CEST)
- Postal code: 7496
- Dialing code: 0547

Hengevelde (or Wegdam) is a village in the eastern Netherlands. It is located in the municipality of Hof van Twente. Until 2011 it was in Ambt Delden.

== History ==
It was first mentioned in 1188 as Hengheuelde, and means "field on the hill". It was also referred to as Wegdam. In 1806, a church was built, and the village started to develop. In 1840, it was home to 355 people.

== Notable people ==
- Mike te Wierik, footballer

== Gallery ==
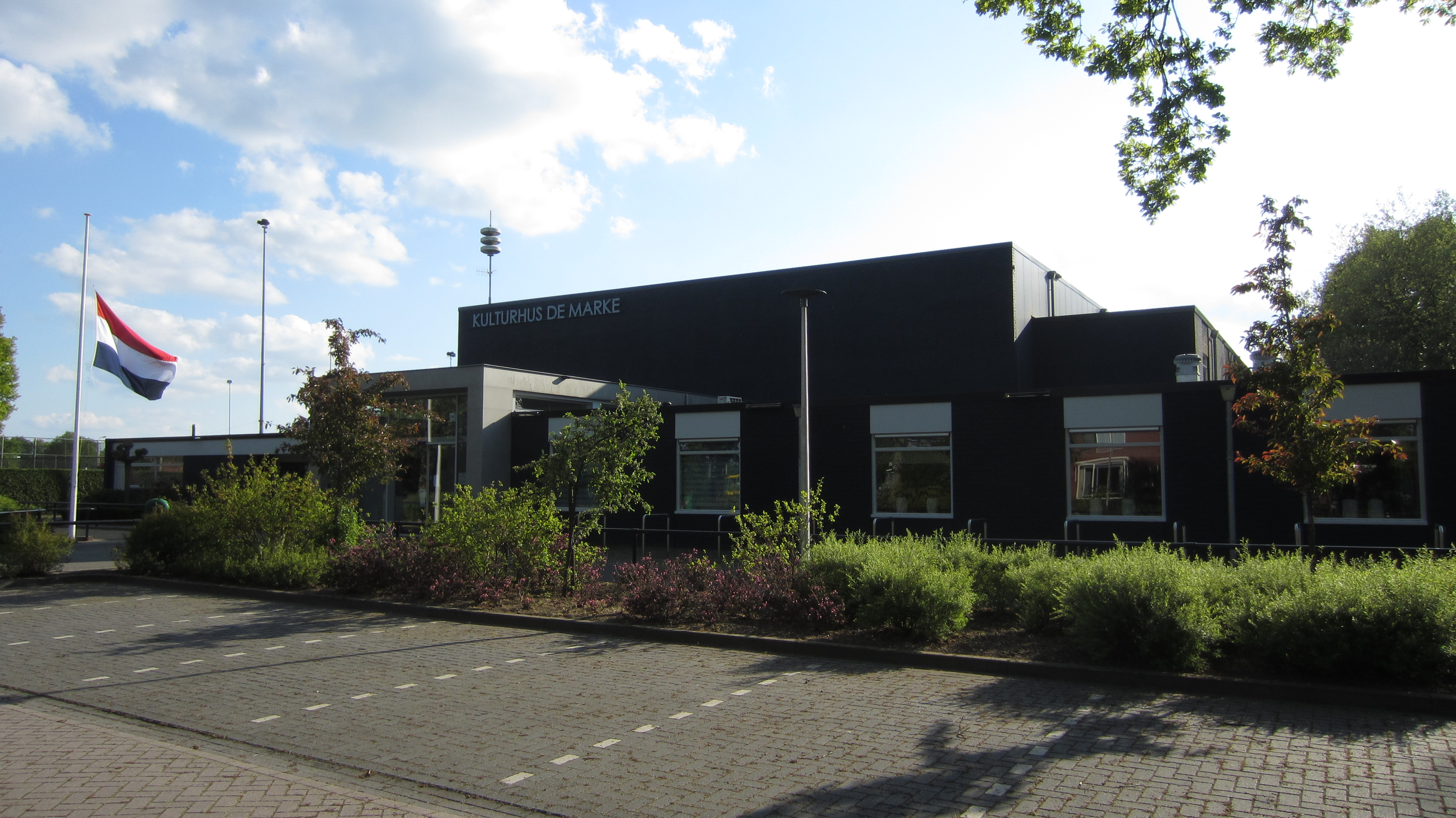
Kulturhus de Marke

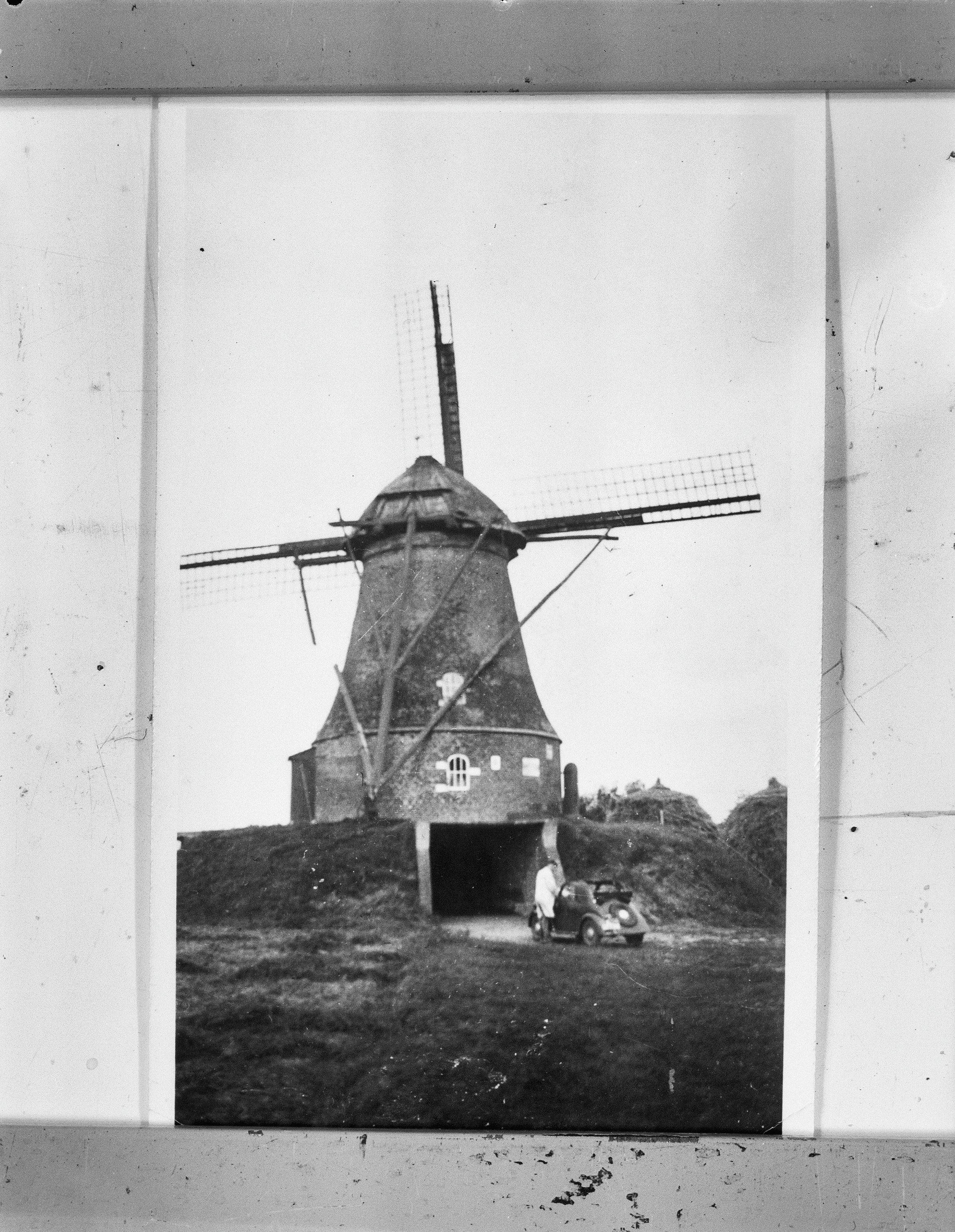
Former windmill De Bolschermolen

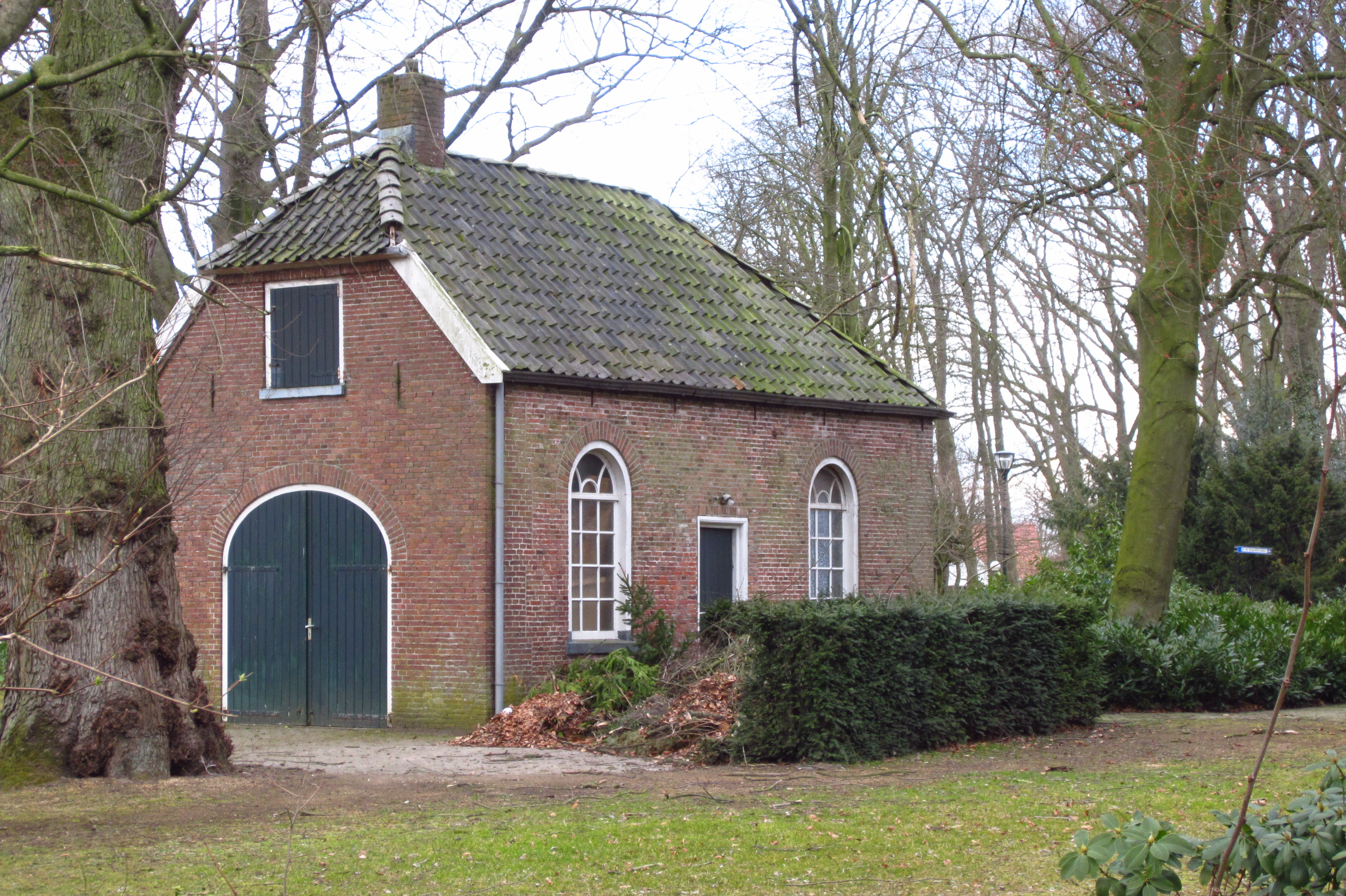
Farm in Hengeveld

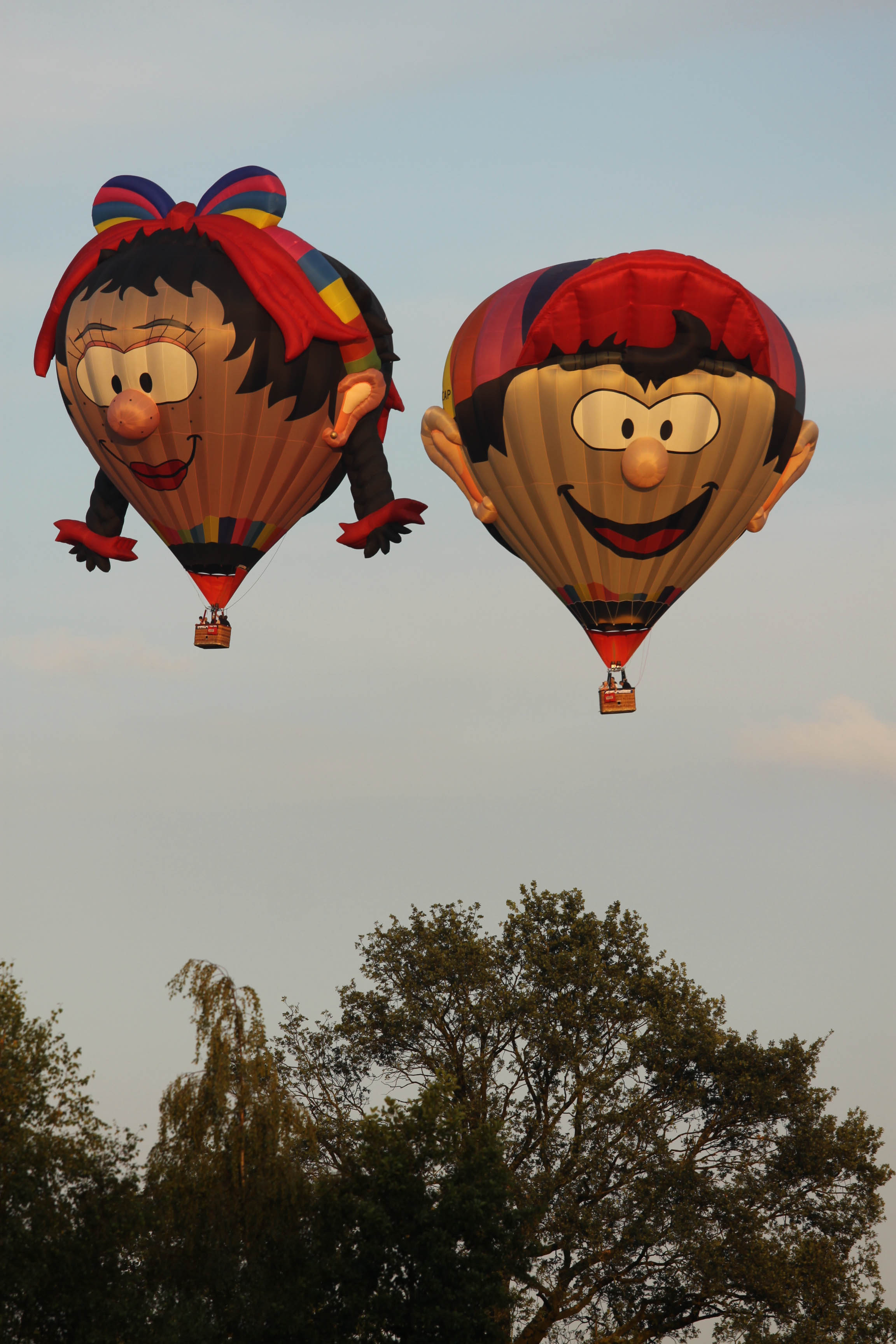
Ballooning at Hengeveld (2011)
