= Rutger Kopland =

Dutch poet

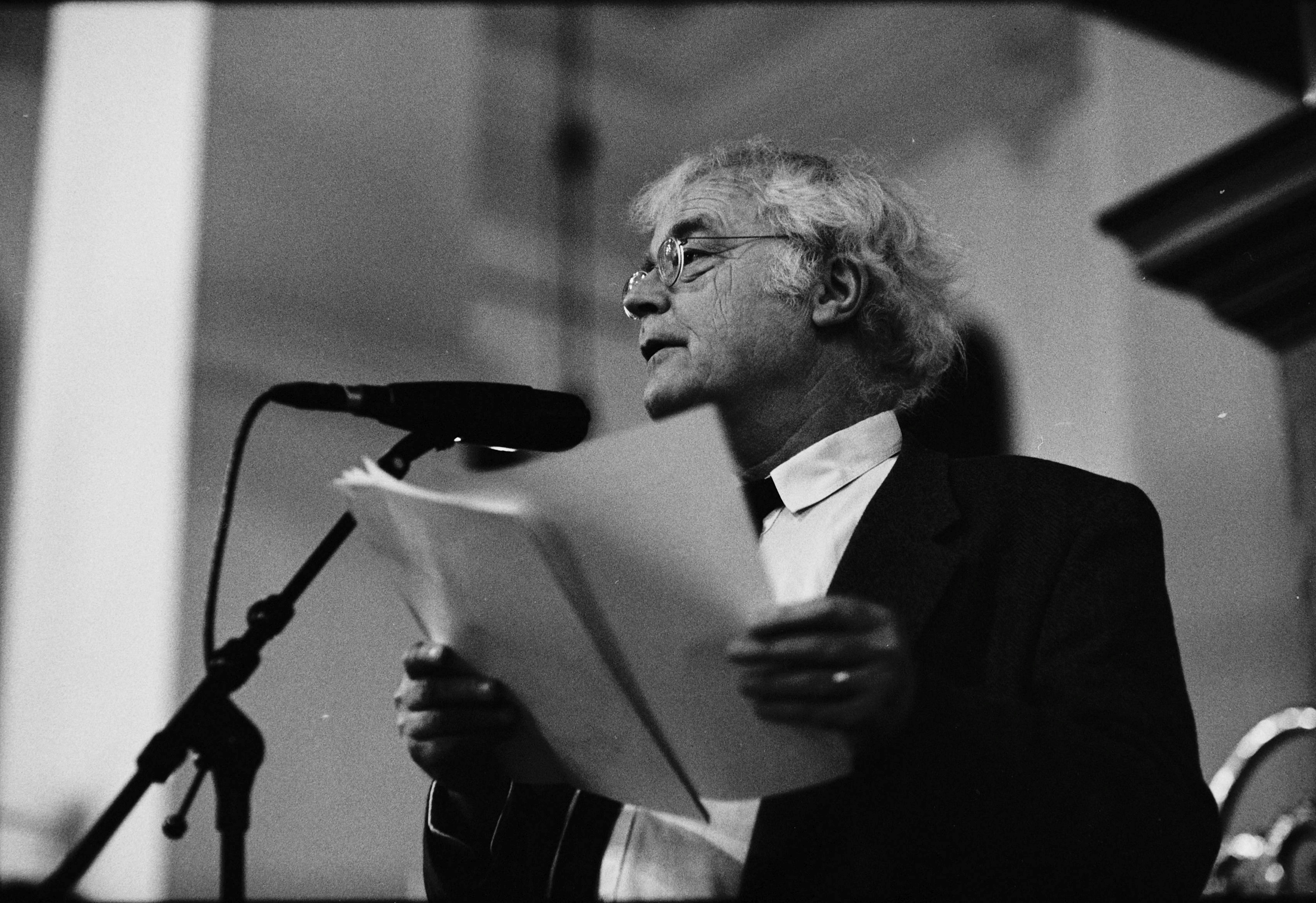
- Rutger Kopland (1997)
- Born: Rudi van den Hoofdakker; August 4, 1934; Goor, Overijssel, Netherlands
- Died: July 11, 2012 (aged 77); Glimmen, Groningen, Netherlands
- Occupation: Poet

Rutger Kopland (born Rudi van den Hoofdakker) (4 August 1934, Goor – 11 July 2012, Glimmen) was a Dutch poet who gained great popularity for his "accessible, thoughtful style, his mild irony, his sentimentality" and whose collections sold over 200,000 copies.

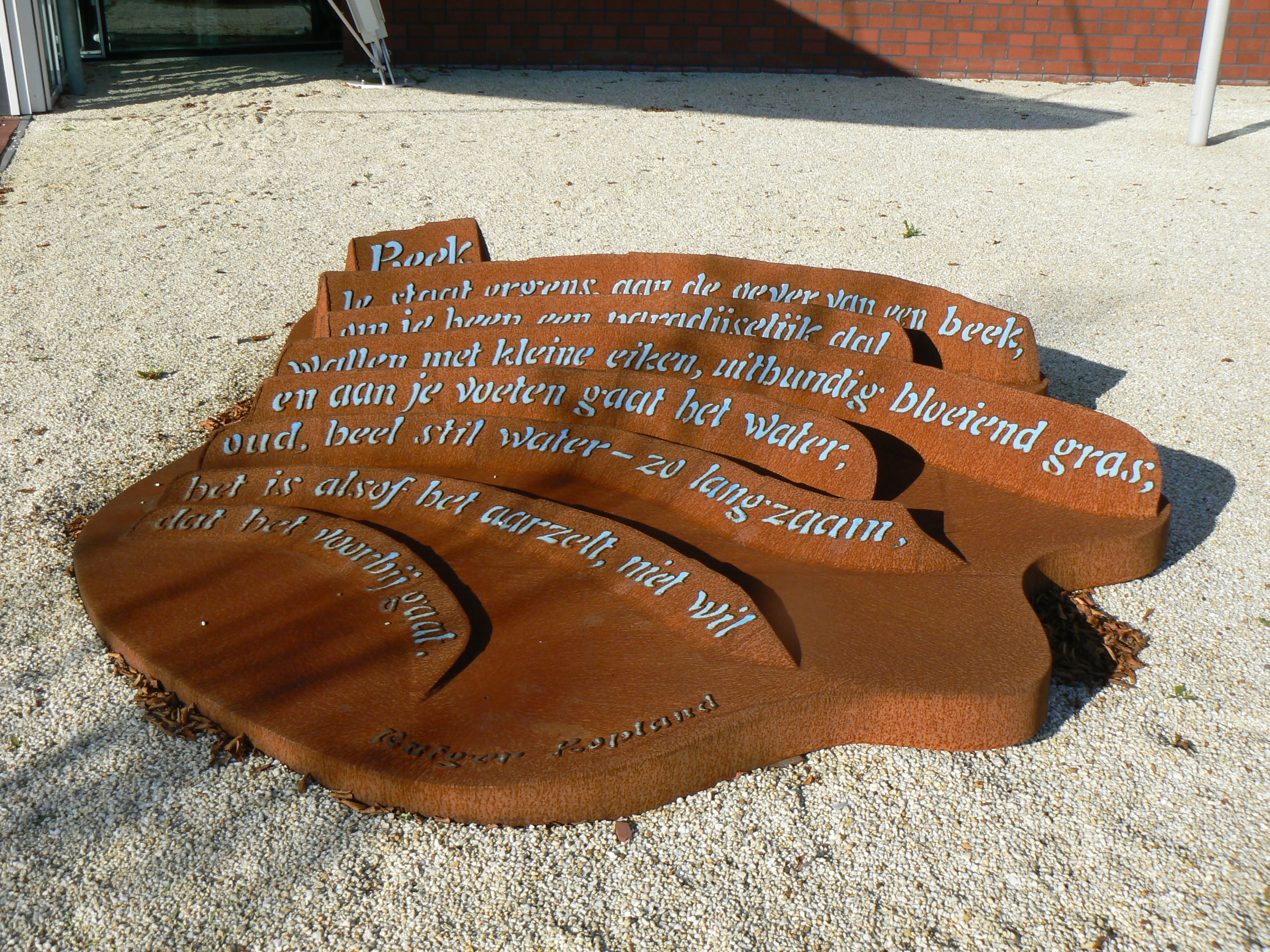
Sculptured poetry from Rutger Kopland ("Beek") in Veendam
