= Hannie Rouweler =

Dutch poet

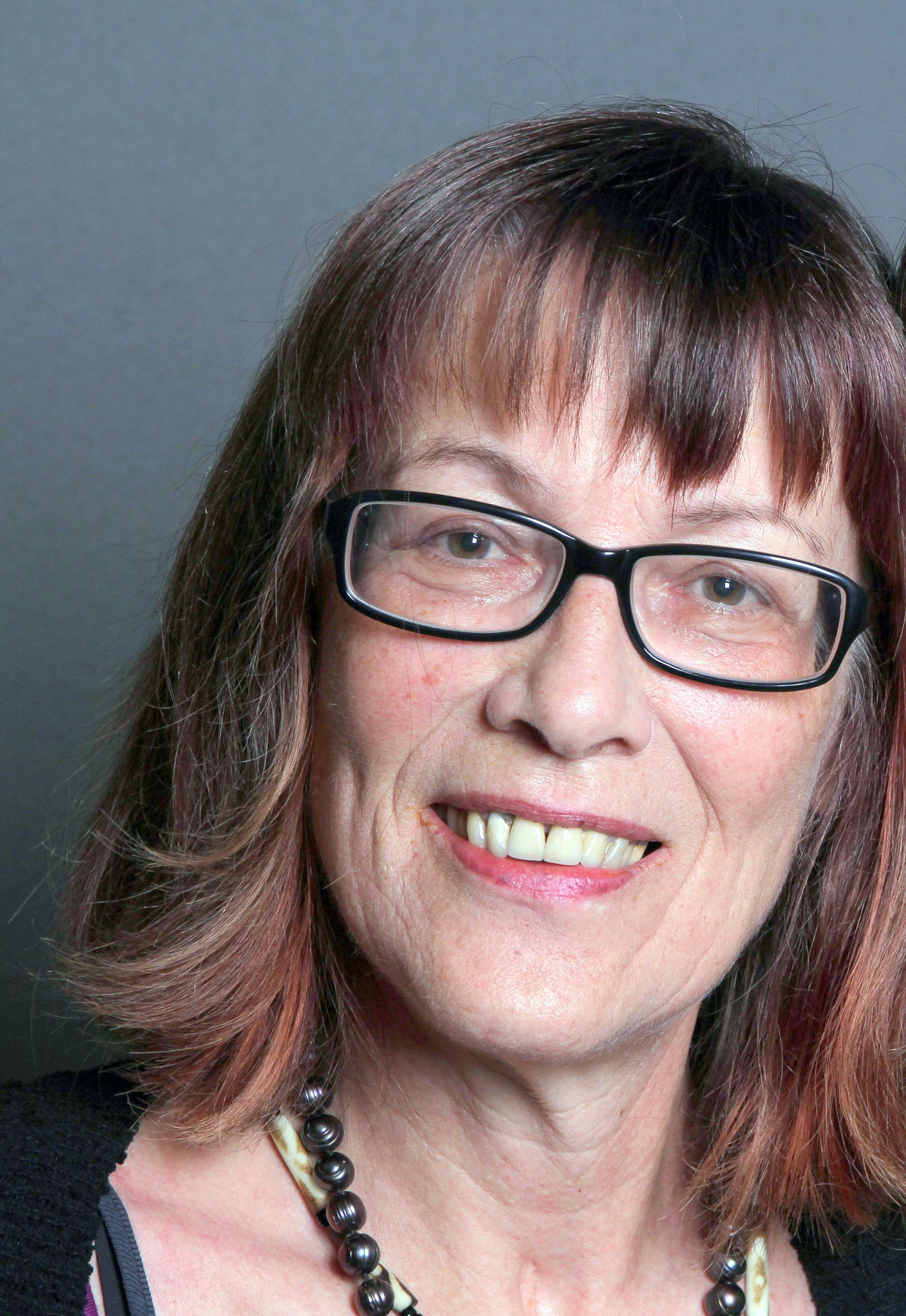
Hannie Rouweler in 2015

Hannie Rouweler (born 13 June 1951 in Goor, Overijssel) is a Dutch poet.

== Biography ==
Rouweler was born as one of seven children in a Roman Catholic family in the primarily Protestant village of Goor. She has said that she began writing at age 15, but she was well into her thirties before she published her first collection Regendruppels op het water ("Raindrops on the water") in 1988.

She has published 20 additional books since Regendruppels op het water and is considered among the leading voices in current Dutch poetry. In 1981 her daughter was born, in Amsterdam.

In 2008 she has started Demer Uitgeverij/Demer Press, ePublisher, publishing anthologies, individual poetry books, and translations.

Hannie has performed in The Netherlands, Belgium, Ireland, Spain, Norway, Dumfries, Scotland as part of the international poets for the birthday celebrations of Robert Burns.

She lived in Belgium during the period of 2004 through 2012. In 2013, she moved back to The Netherlands, to Leusden.

== Published works ==
- Regendruppels op het water (1988)
- Langs de vloedlijn (1989),
- Onder een glasplaat (1990)
- Langs de Rand (1990)
- Steen en huid (1992)
- Reiziger naar het woord (1993)
- Rivieren en Ravijnen (1995)
- Ankerplaats (1995)
- Tekens van tijd (1996)
- Bewegingen (1997)
- In de branding van de dag (1999)
- Skyline (2000)
- Uiterwaarden (2003)
- Vogel op steen (2005)
- Bloemlezing: Rozen verwelken, bloemen (2006)
- Wolken, Ankers (2008)
- Nieuwe Gedichten (2009)
- Een reis langs rood en wit (2011)
- Avondluchten in Diepenbeek (2011)

Translations (books of poetry) in French, Spanish, English, Polish, Rumanian.
