= Wijnand Duyvendak =

Dutch politician

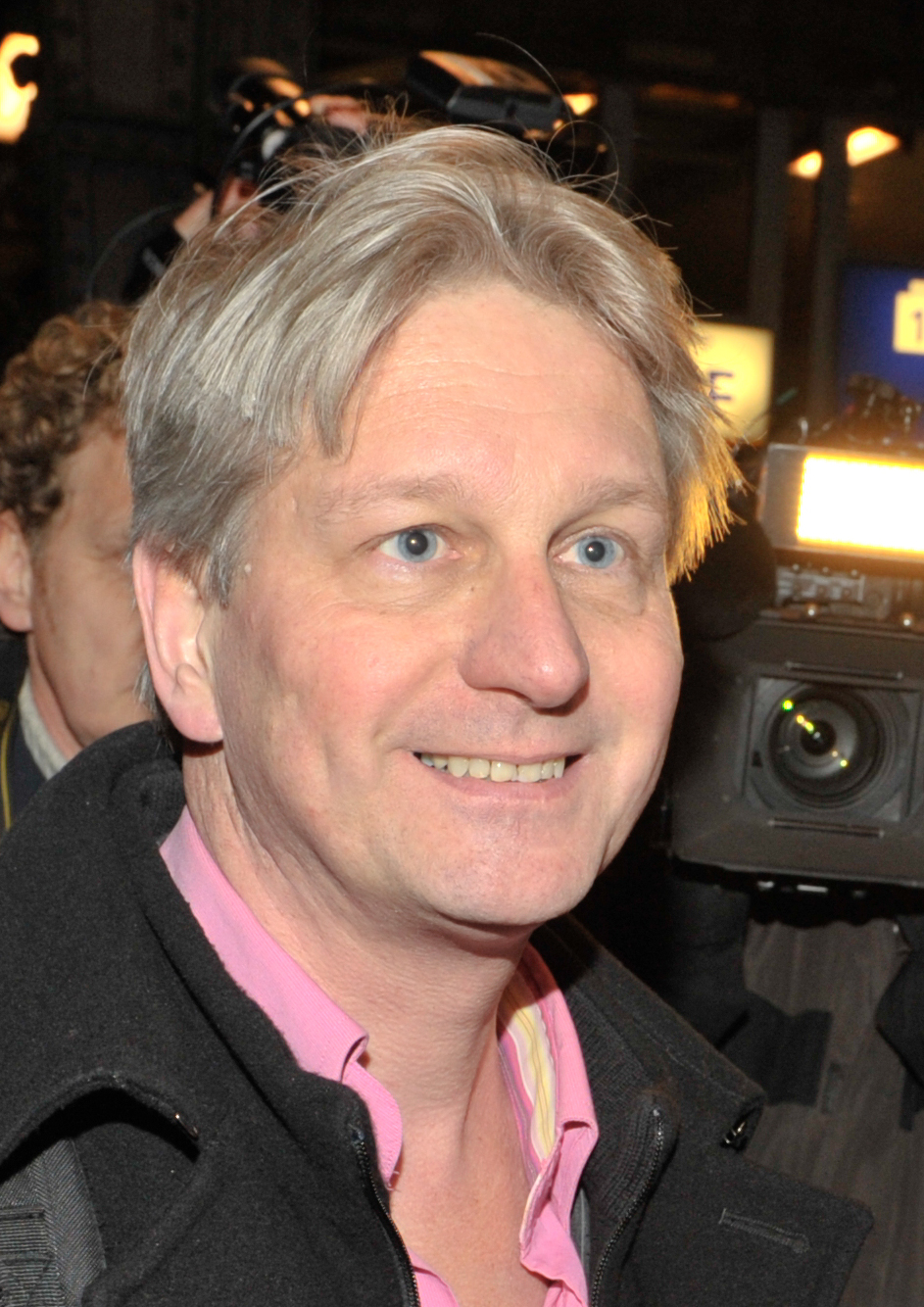
- Wijnand Duyvendak in 2009

Member of the House of Representatives
- In office 2002–2008

Personal details
- Born: 30 November 1957 (age 68) Markelo, Netherlands
- Party: GreenLeft
- Spouse: Miriam de Rijk

Anton Johan Wijnand (Wijnand) Duijvendak (born 30 November 1957) is a Dutch politician. He is a former member of the House of Representatives for GreenLeft.

== Biography ==
Duyvendak is the eldest son of a minister from Zeist. After his high school he studied sociology at the University of Amsterdam between 1976 and 1980. He did not finish his studies and instead became involved the leftwing Amsterdam action world: he became involved in the squatting movement and the anti-militarist action group Onkruit. In 1984 he was jailed for six weeks for having broken into the Dubbeldam military complex together with other members of Onkruit.

Between 1984 and 1987 he wrote for the radical magazine Bluf!. After that he became involved in the Anti-Apartheid Committee "Get Shell out of South Africa" and he was an editor at the publisher Ravijn. De Telegraaf and HP/De Tijd-journalist Peter Siebelt have claimed that Duyvendak was involved with the violent Revolutionary Anti-Racist Action group. Duyvendak has always denied any involvement in violent action. In 1993 he began to work for MilieuDefensie and led their campaigns against the extension of Schiphol Airport. In 1999 he became the director of MilieuDefensie's bureau, which he remained until 2002.

Duyvendak was elected in the 2002 elections as a member of the GreenLeft list. In parliament he focused on environmental issues, spatial planning and transport. He was considered one of the most important 'green faces' of the GreenLeft. He has initiated some plans for governmental reform, including the temporary law on the referendum, together with Niesco Dubbelboer of the social-democrat PvdA, which was rejected in 2005. He supported a constitutional amendment providing for referendums together with Dubbelboer and Boris van der Ham of the social-liberal D66 party. He has researched the power of those committees, commissions and councils which were not, in his view, under sufficient parliamentary scrutiny. He chaired the GreenLeft's campaign committee.

In 2008, Duyvendak published his book Klimaatactivist in de politiek (A climate activist in politics). In this book, he described his run-ins with the law, including his 1984 jailing. He also mentioned how, in 1985, he admitted having stolen documents on nuclear power plants during a burglary on the Dutch ministry of economic affairs. Previously, Duyvendak always denied such involvement. The fall-out was severe, prompting calls for his resignation, especially after media reported that the burglary had led to threats of violence against civil servants.

On 13 August 2008 NRC Handelsblad published an open letter by George Verberg, previous director-general of the ministry of economic affairs and responsible for the area of nuclear power. He accused Duyvendak of inciting people to terrorize his family in the eighties and claimed to have received burning rags through the letterbox and threatening phone calls in the middle of the night. As editor of Bluf! Duyvendak had published home addresses and holiday information of six senior civil servants including Verberg. Bluf!, under the heading DIY burglary, called its readers to look up these "troublemakers". Duyvendak has always claimed no knowledge of attempted arson on Verbergs home and to strongly disapprove of it. After this publication, his position became untenable. Duyvendak subsequently announced his resignation from the House of Representatives on 14 August 2008. His resignation became effective on 2 September 2008. His seat was taken up by the next eligible GreenLeft candidate on the list of candidates, Jolande Sap.

As of 2024, he worked as a project director for MilieuDefensie. Another book by Duyvendak was released that same year called Recept voor maatschappelijke verandering (Recipe for societal change) about how to achieve goals through activism.
