= Markelo =

Markelo Maarkel (Dutch Low Saxon)
- Village
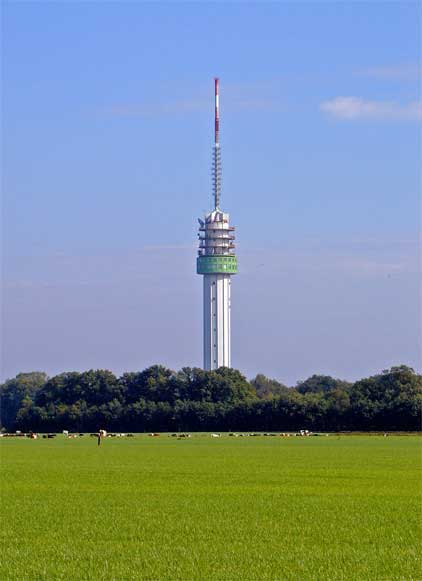
- Television tower of Markelo

- Flag Coat of arms

- Location in province of Overijssel in the Netherlands Markelo (Netherlands)
- Coordinates: 52°14′03″N 6°29′43″E
- Country: Netherlands
- Province: Overijssel
- Municipality: Hof van Twente

Area
  - Total: 62.41 km^{2} (24.10 sq mi)
- Elevation: 18 m (59 ft)

Population (2021)
  - Total: 6,405
  - Density: 102.6/km^{2} (265.8/sq mi)
- Demonym: Markeloërs
- Time zone: UTC+1 (CET)
  - Summer (DST): UTC+2 (CEST)
- Postal code: 7475
- Dialing code: 0547

Markelo (Dutch pronunciation: [ˈmɑrkəloː]; Dutch Low Saxon: Maarkel) is a village in the Dutch province of Overijssel. It is located in the municipality of Hof van Twente, about 20 km (12 mi) west of Hengelo and 20 km (12 mi) south-west of Almelo.

Markelo was a separate municipality between 1818 and 2001, when it became a part of Hof van Twente.

== Overview ==
Markelo developed on the east flank of the Markelose Berg. It was first mentioned in 1188 as Marclo, and means either "forest near communal ground" or "forest near border". The Dutch Reformed Church has a 15th-century tower, but the building dates from 1840. In 1818, it became an independent municipality. In 1840, it was home to 793 people.

In 1836, the gristmill De Hoop was built near Markelo. It was restored in 1991. Markelo used to be an agricultural village, however the eastern side of the village has become a residential zone. In 2001, it became part of Hof van Twente.

== Sports ==
Since 1932, the motor club "Ons Genoegen" has organised a motocross in Markelo. Originally the circuit was at Markelose Berg, but in 1947, the venue changed to Herikerberg where the terrain is more uneven. The motocross has turned into an international event.

== Notable people ==
- Maria van Beckum (before 1510–1544), Anabaptist who was burnt at the stake
- Bert Boom (born 1938), cyclist
- Wijnand Duyvendak (born 1957), politician
- Ellen Jansen (born 1992), footballer
- Gert-Jan Oplaat (born 1964), politician
- Anton Smit (born 1945), screenwriter, television and film producer
- Bakermat (born 1991), DJ and music producer

== Gallery ==
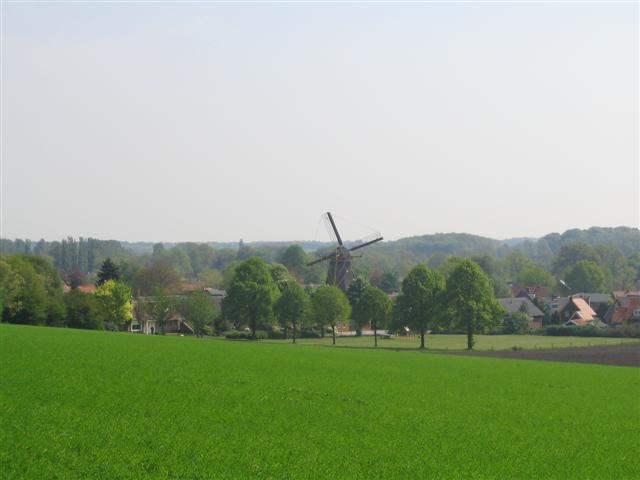
Markelose Berg, a hill near the village

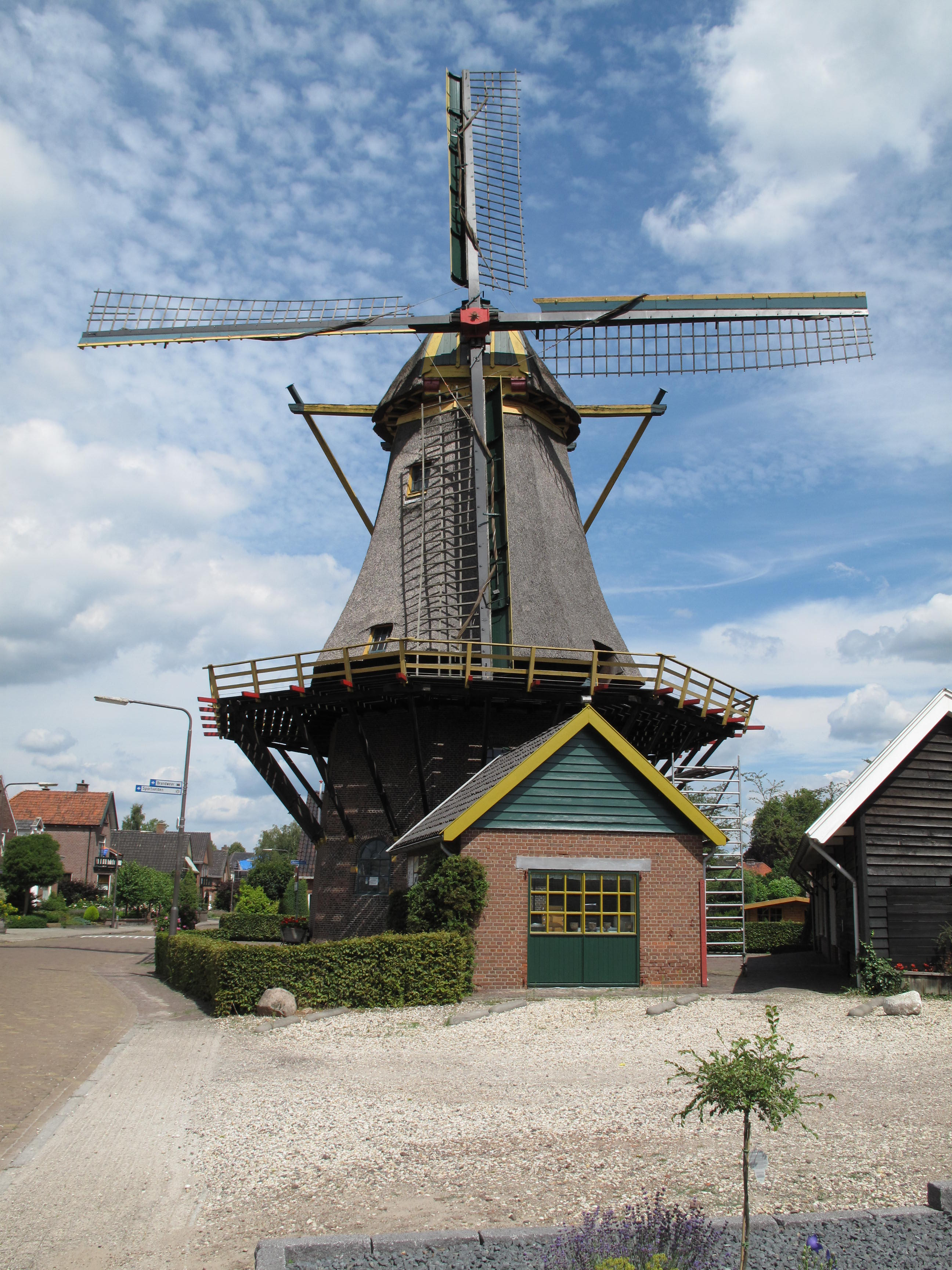
Markelo, windmill

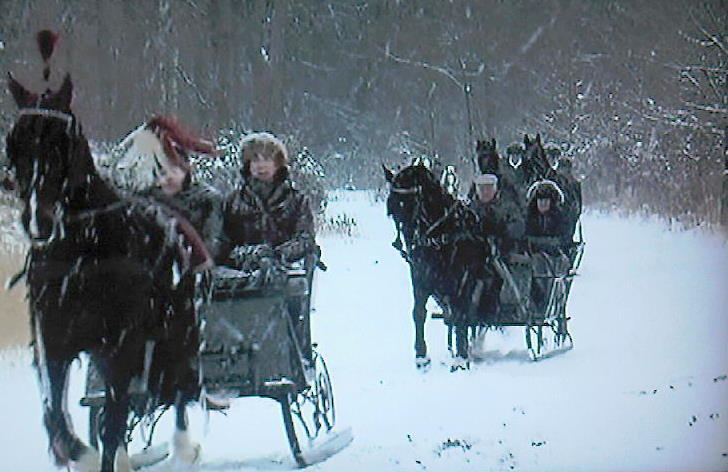
Winter in Markelo

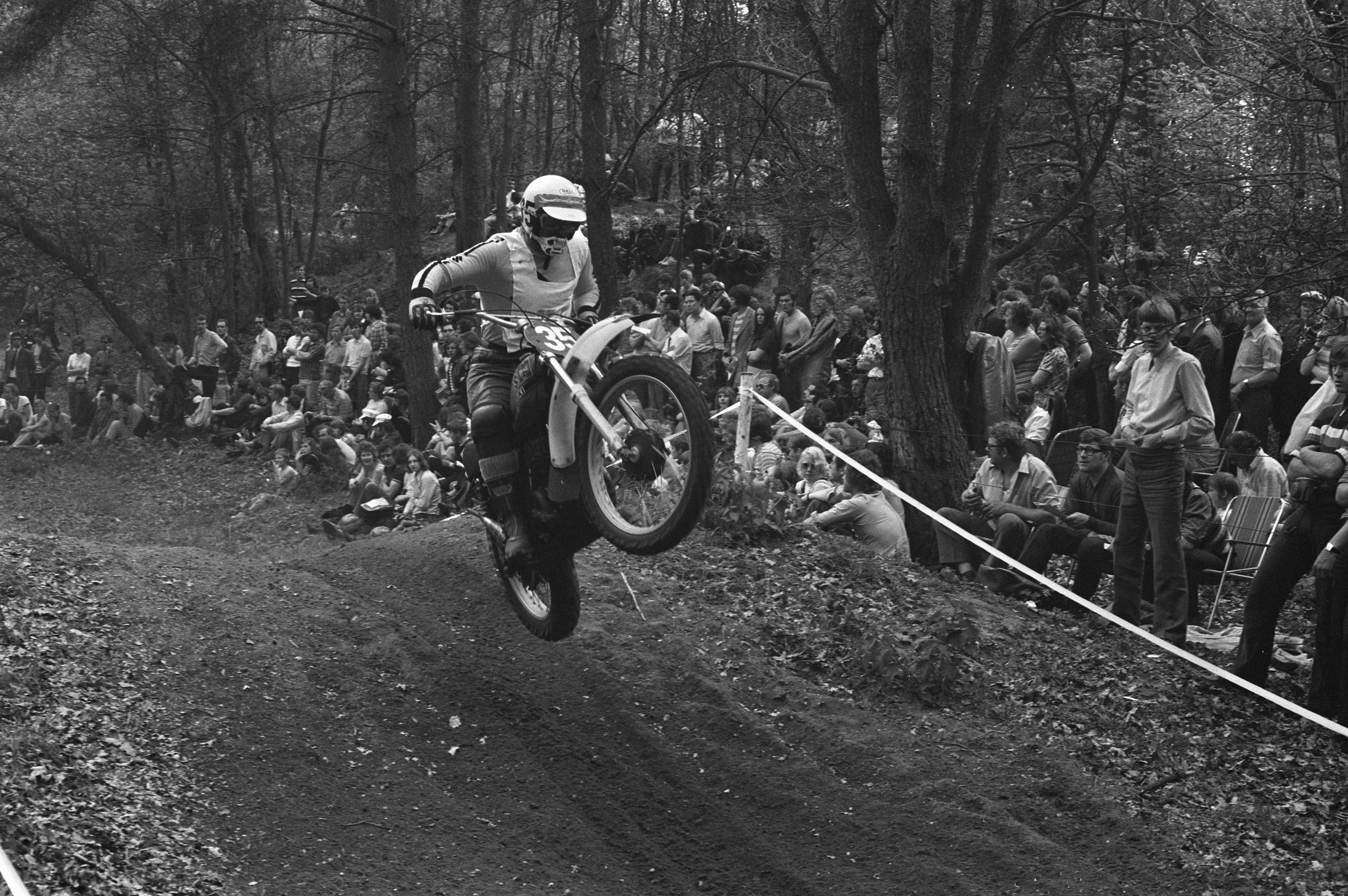
Motocross Grand Prix in 1972
