= Geesteren, Overijssel =

Geesteren Geestern (Twents)
- Village
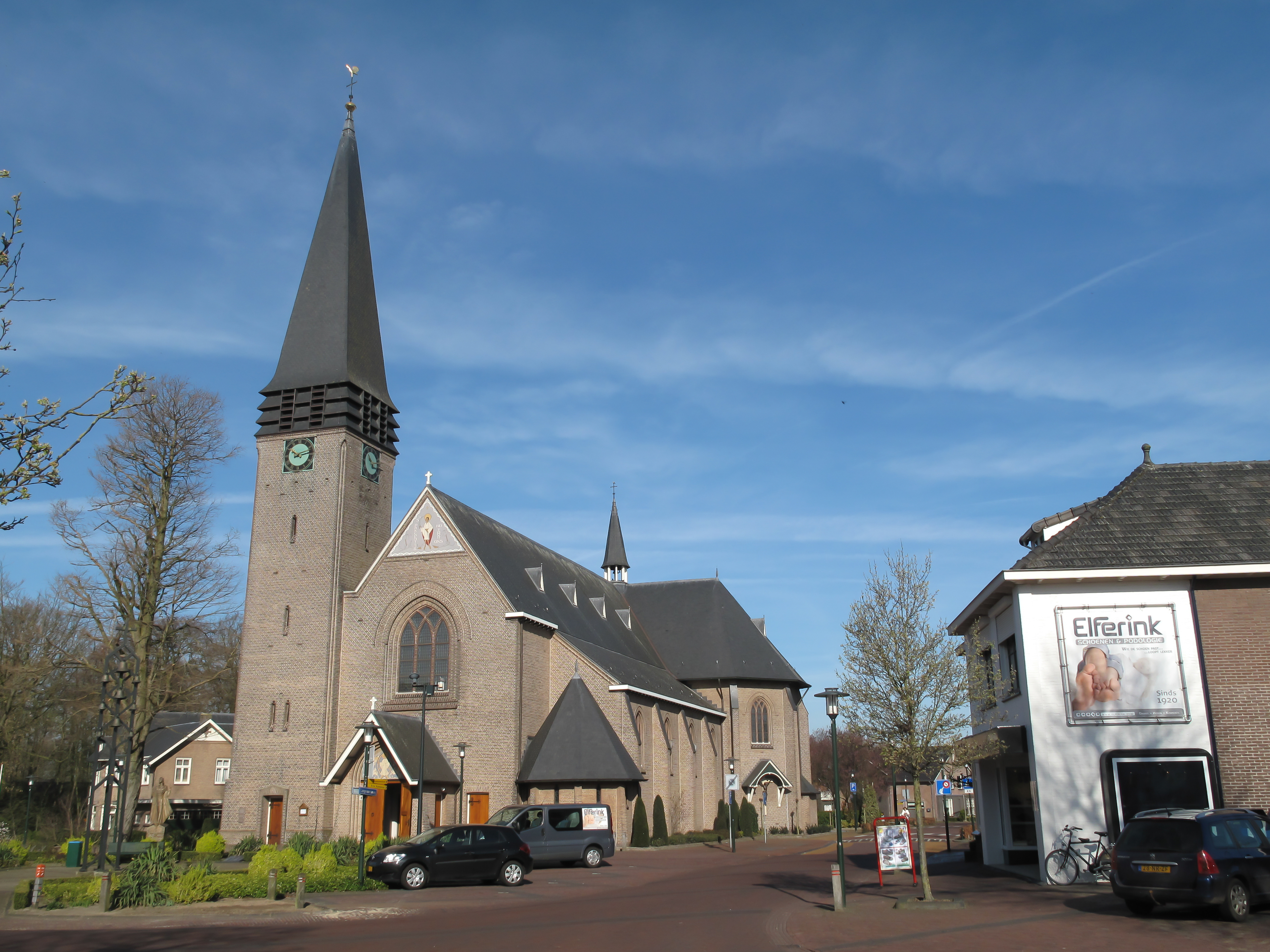
- St. Pancratius Church, Geesteren

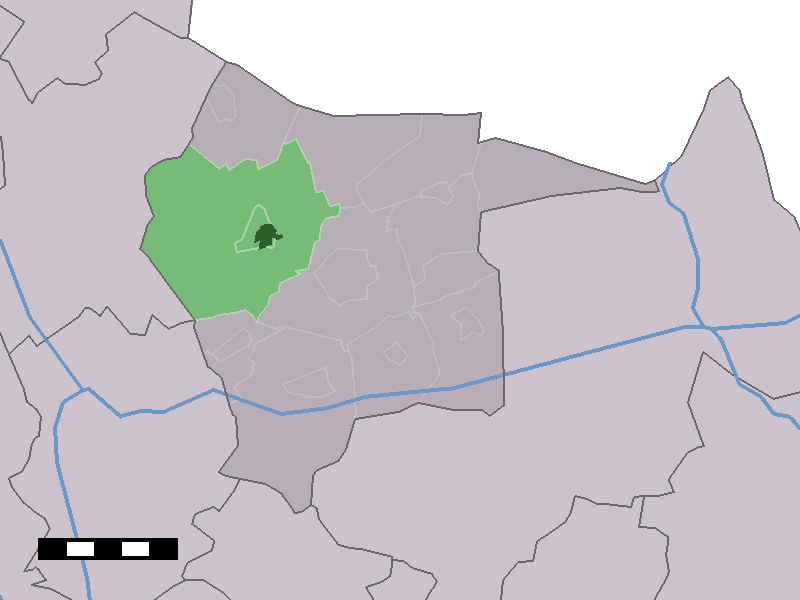
- The village centre (dark green) and the statistical district (light green) of Geesteren in the municipality of Tubbergen.

- Location in province of Overijssel in the Netherlands Geesteren (Netherlands)
- Coordinates: 52°25′N 6°44′E
- Country: Netherlands
- Province: Overijssel
- Municipality: Tubbergen

Area
  - Total: 31.90 km^{2} (12.32 sq mi)
- Elevation: 17 m (56 ft)

Population (2021)
  - Total: 4,325
  - Density: 135.6/km^{2} (351.2/sq mi)
- Demonym(s): Geesternaren, Papsleevn
- Time zone: UTC+1 (CET)
  - Summer (DST): UTC+2 (CEST)
- Postal code: 7678
- Dialing code: 0546

Geesteren (Tweants: Geestern) is a village in the eastern Netherlands. It is located in the municipality of Tubbergen, Overijssel about 9 km northeast of Almelo.

It was first mentioned in 1268 as Geysteren. The etymology is unclear. Around 1800, it developed into a village around the Catholic church. In 1840, Geesteren together with Harbrinkhoek and Langeveen were home to 1,329 people. The Roman Catholic church, St. Pancratius, is named after Pancras of Rome, and dates from 1926.

Every year an international concours hippique is organised at Erve Maathuis mainly focussing on show jumping. In 2019 this 'CSI Twente' celebrated its 45th anniversary.

A landmark alongside the main road is the windmill 'Grote Geesterse Molen' which dates from 1867.

== Gallery ==
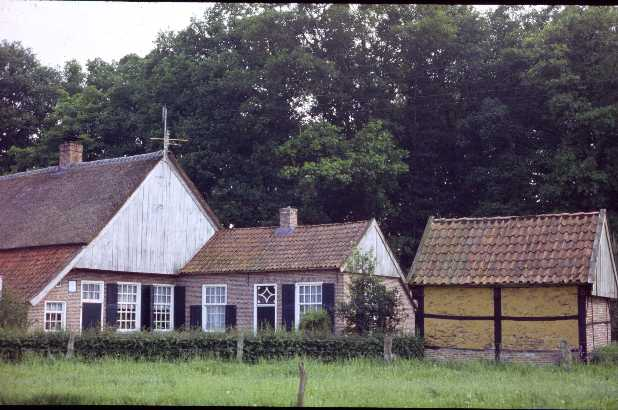
Old style farmhouse with barn

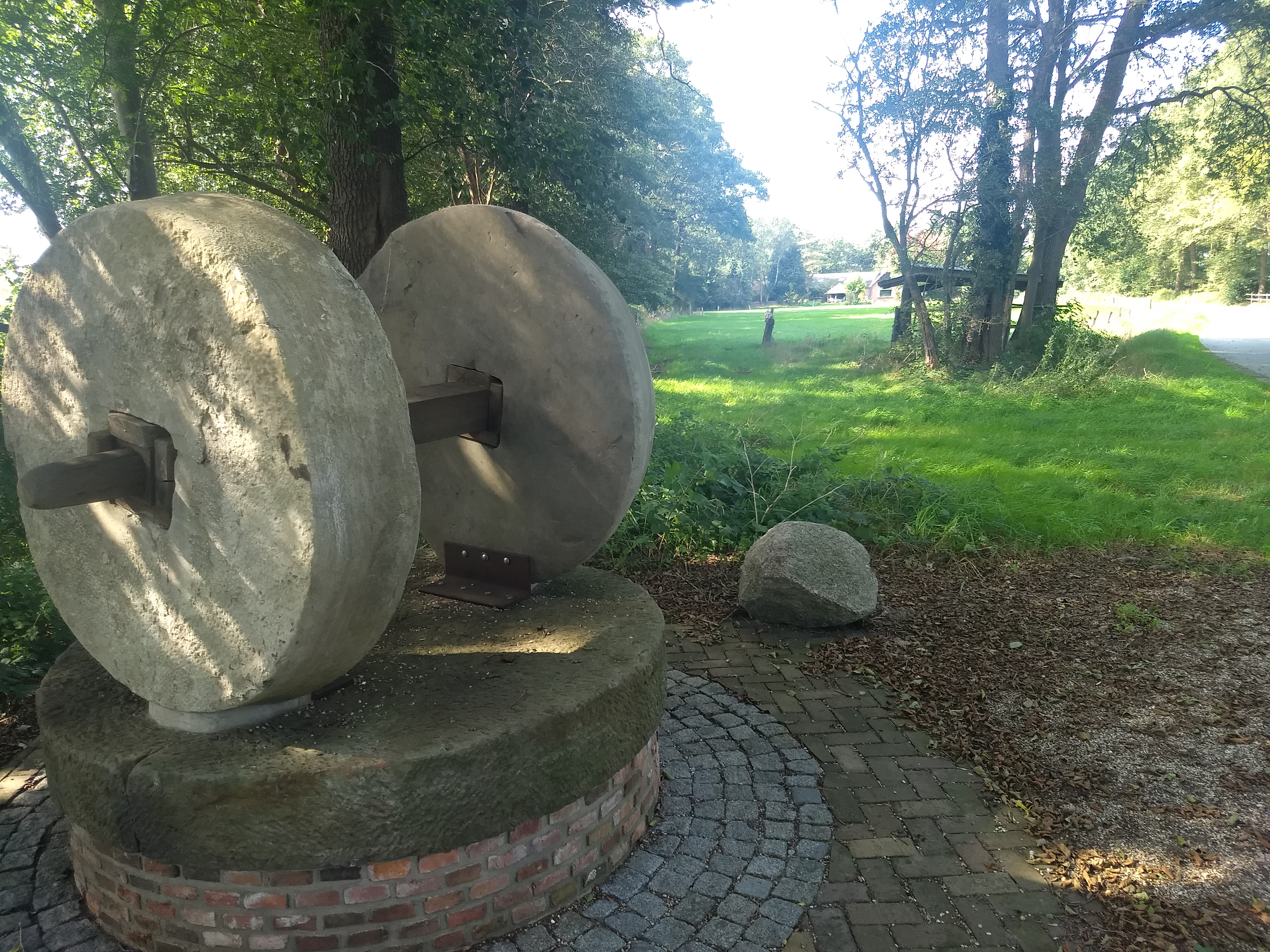
Monument for a vanished mill

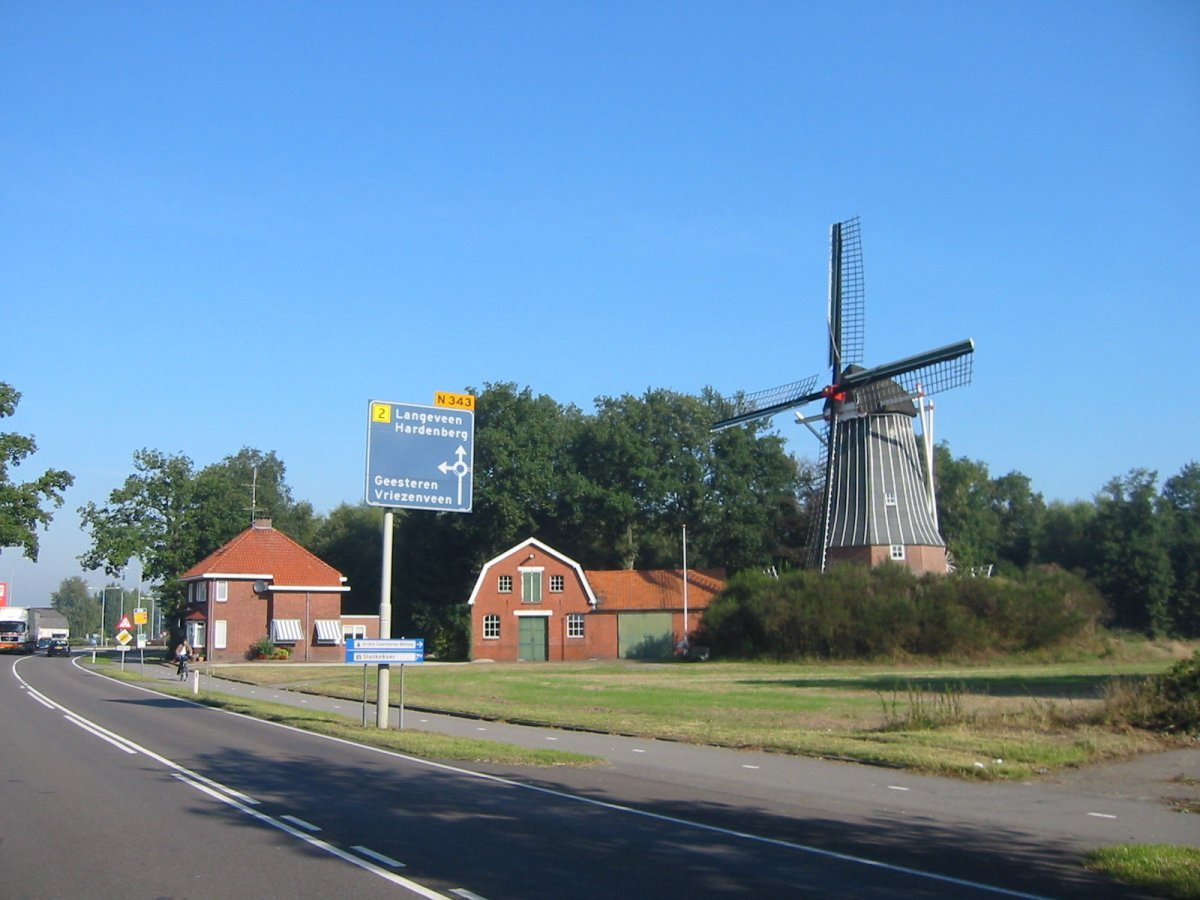
Grote Geesterse Molen

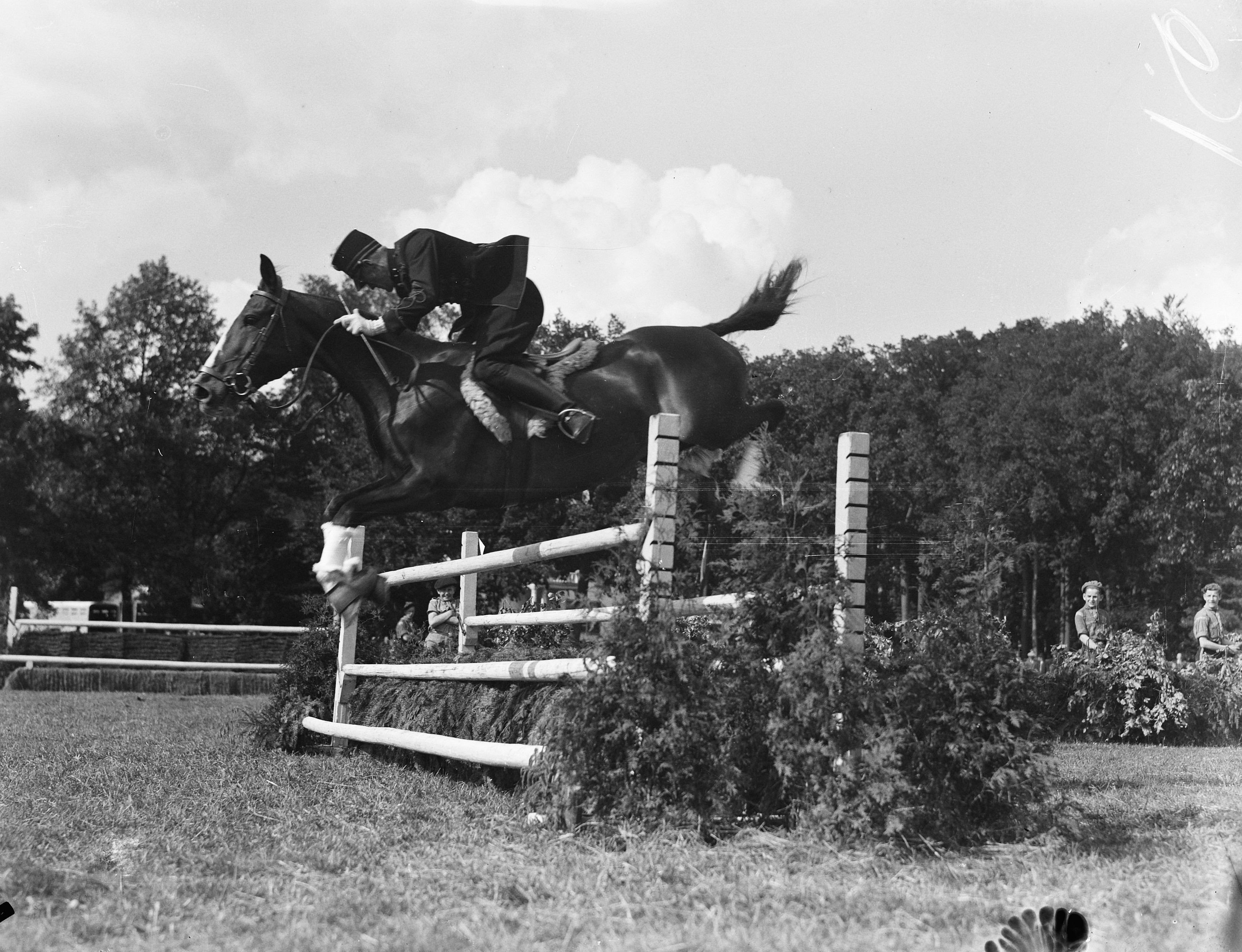
Concours Hippique (1946)
