= Hezingen =

Hezingen Hezingn (Twents)
- Hamlet
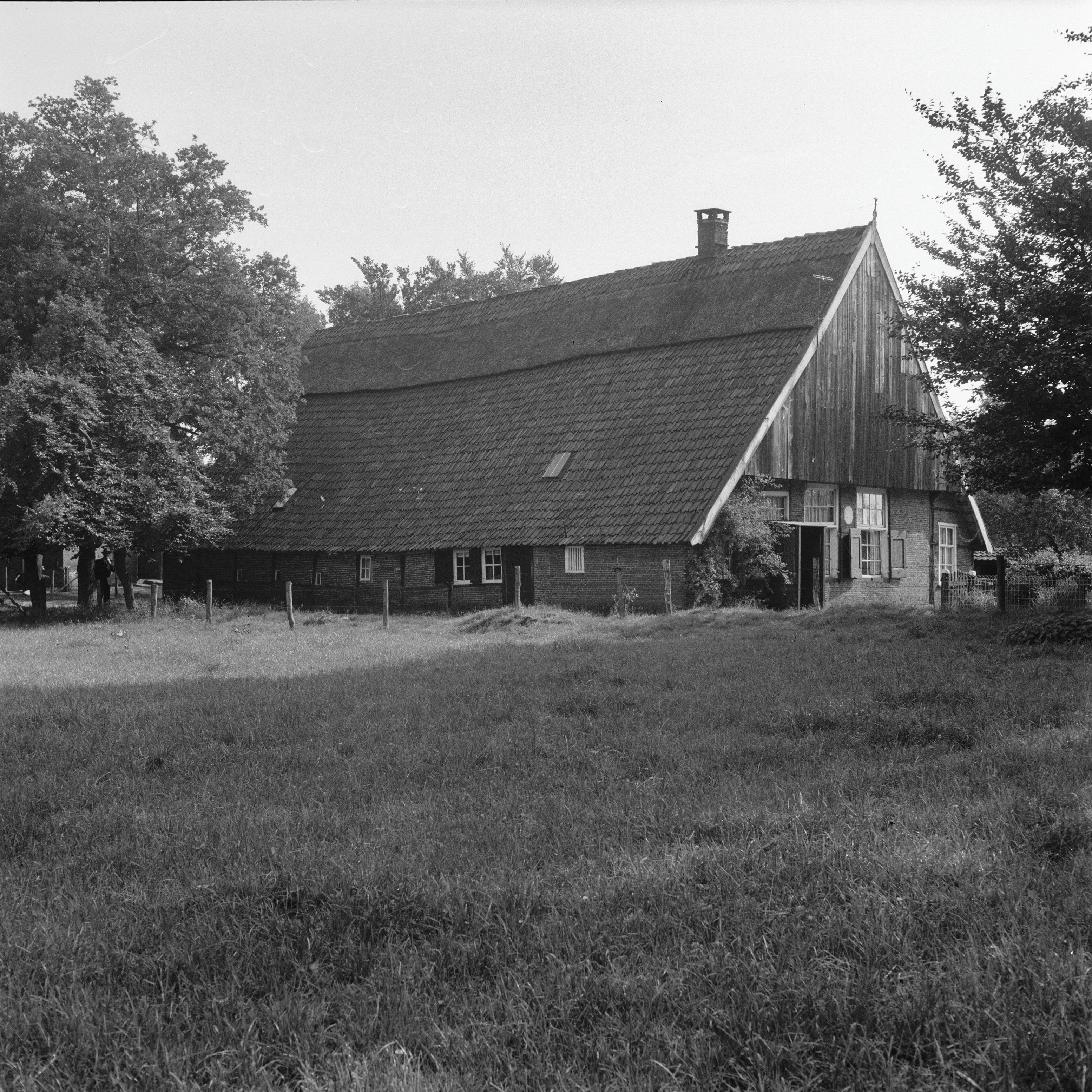
- Low German house, 1963

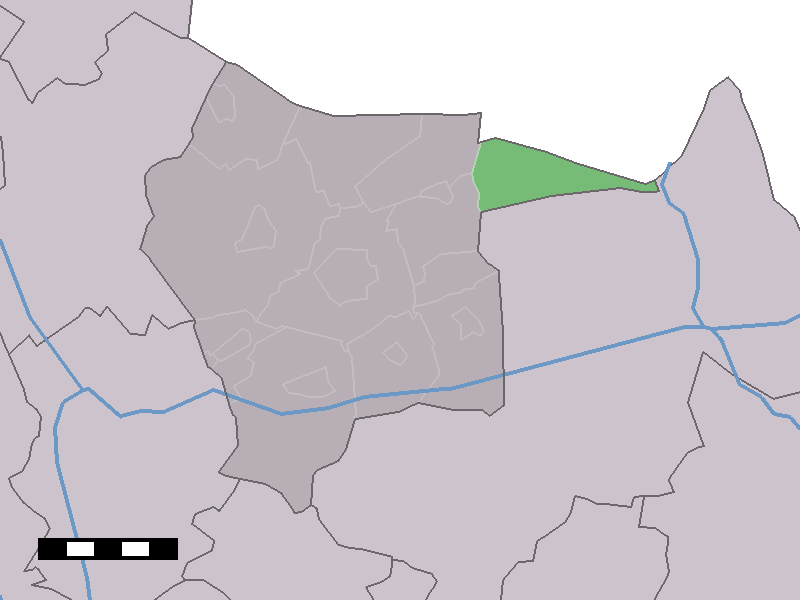
- The village (dark red) and the statistical district (light green) of Mander in the municipality of Tubbergen.

- Location in province of Overijssel in the Netherlands Hezingen (Netherlands)
- Coordinates: 52°27′N 6°51′E
- Country: Netherlands
- Province: Overijssel
- Municipality: Tubbergen

Area
  - Total: 8.81 km^{2} (3.40 sq mi)
- Elevation: 33 m (108 ft)

Population (2021)
  - Total: 210
  - Density: 24/km^{2} (62/sq mi)
- Demonym(s): Hezingers, Steenbikkers
- Time zone: UTC+1 (CET)
  - Summer (DST): UTC+2 (CEST)
- Postal code: 7662
- Dialing code: 0541

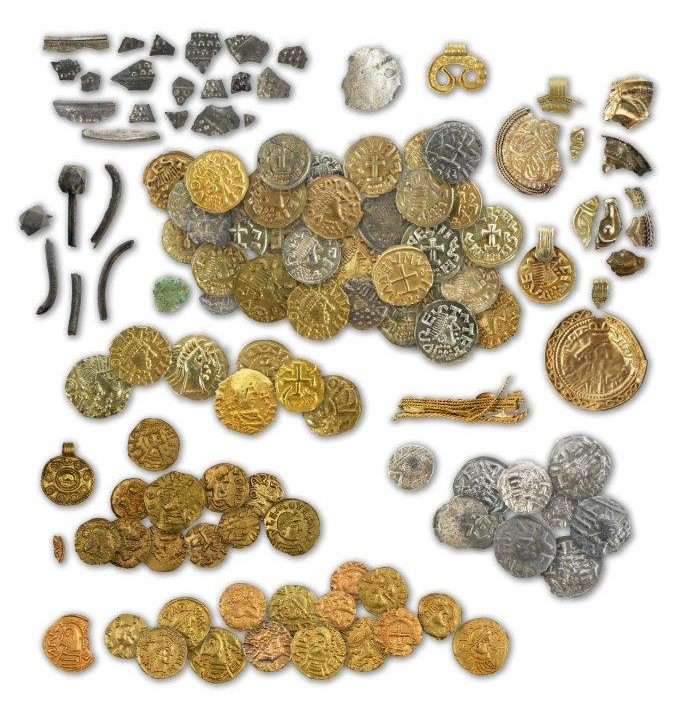
Selection of finds from the early medieval cult site of Hezingen

Hezingen (Tweants: Hezingn) is a hamlet in the Dutch province of Overijssel. It is a part of the municipality of Tubbergen, and lies about 15 km north of Oldenzaal.

It was first mentioned in 799 as Hasungum. In 1840, it was home to 187 people.

The hamlet is situated between Vasse and the border to Germany. Across the border it has a twin village called Hesingen.

Springendal was bought in the 1920s by textile industrialist Gerhard Jannink who decorated the forest around the estate with ponds, waterfalls and little meandering streams. The nature area is nowadays publicly accessible.

In 2019 a treasure of 70 golden coins and jewellery from the 7th and 8th century were discovered in Springendal. This later led to three archaeological excavations in 2020 en 2021 that yielded more coins (so-called tremisses and sceats) and jewellery. Apart from these finds an east-west oriented row of postholes was uncovered, aligned with a large boulder. In the fill of some of these postholes coins were found. The site was interpreted as an early medieval cult site.

== Gallery ==
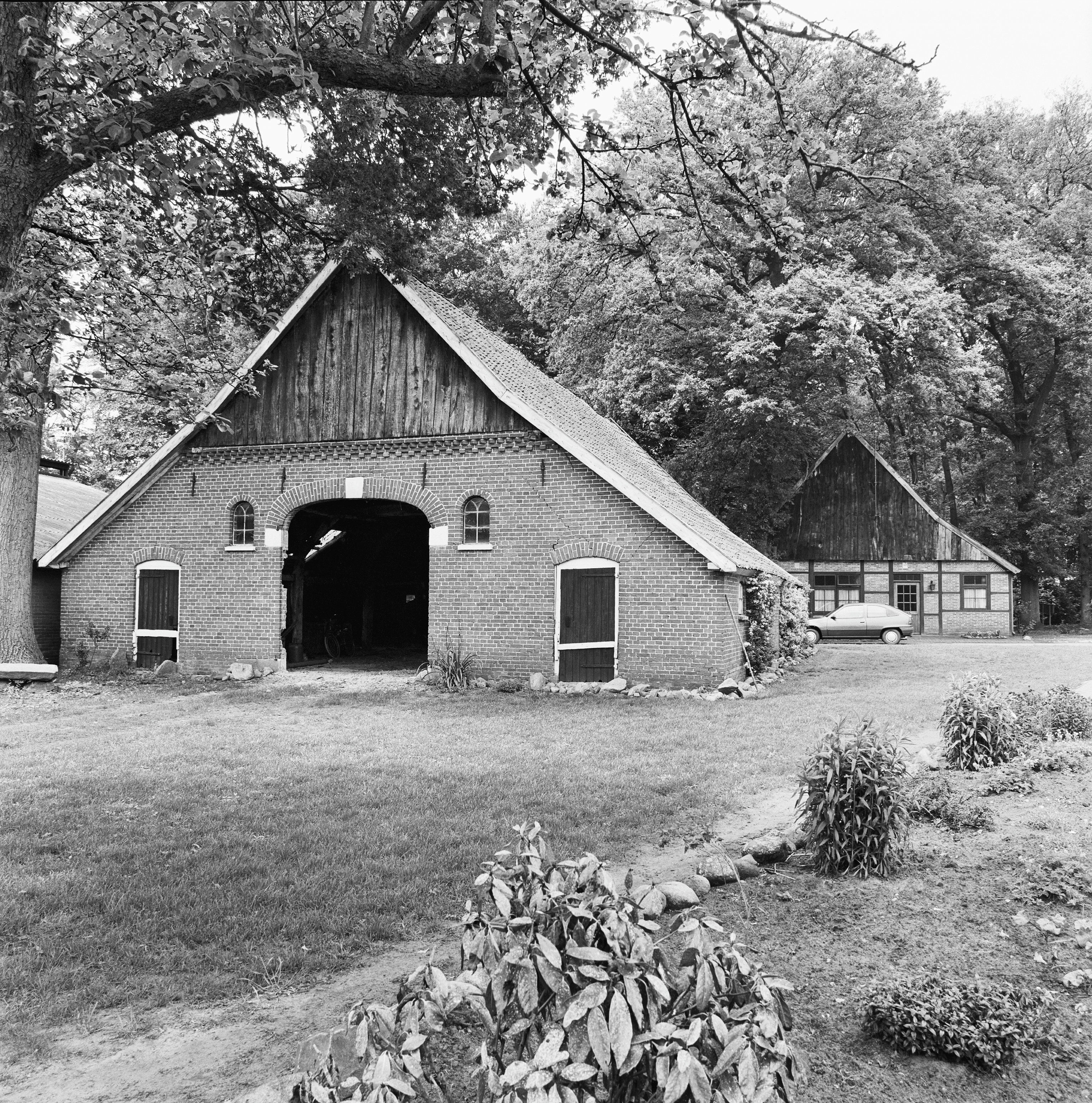
Timber framing

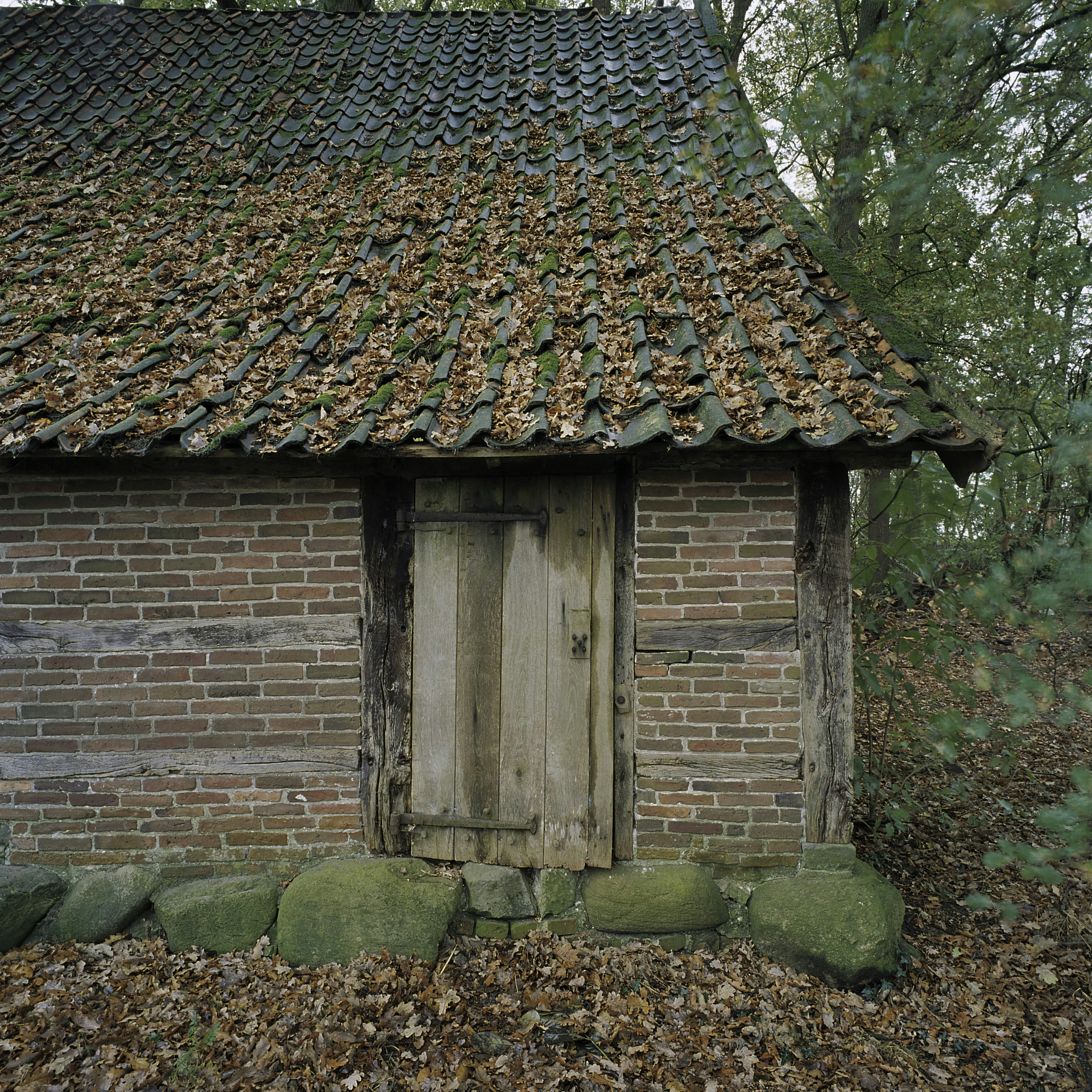
Timber framing

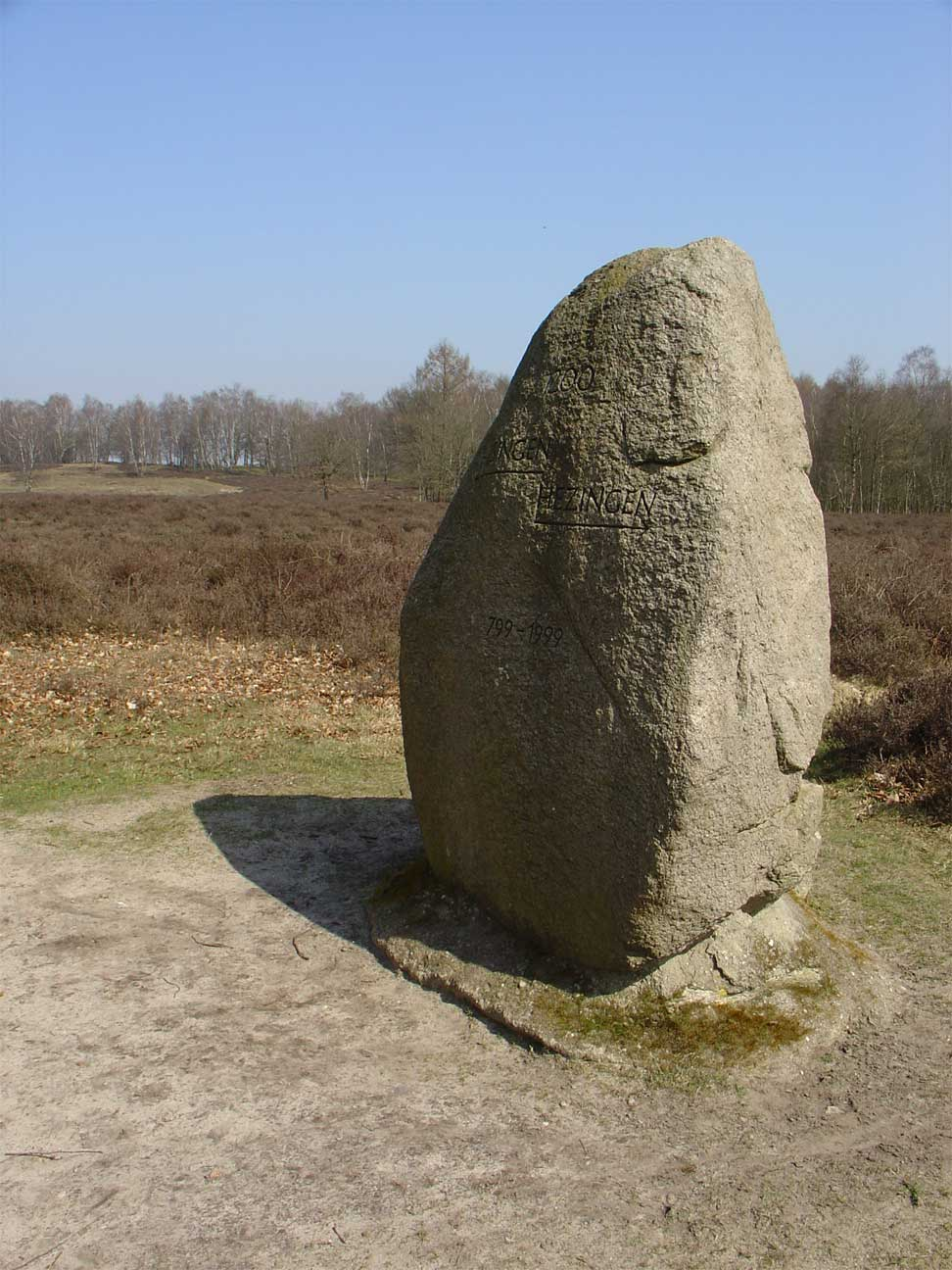
A glacial erratic as boundary stone

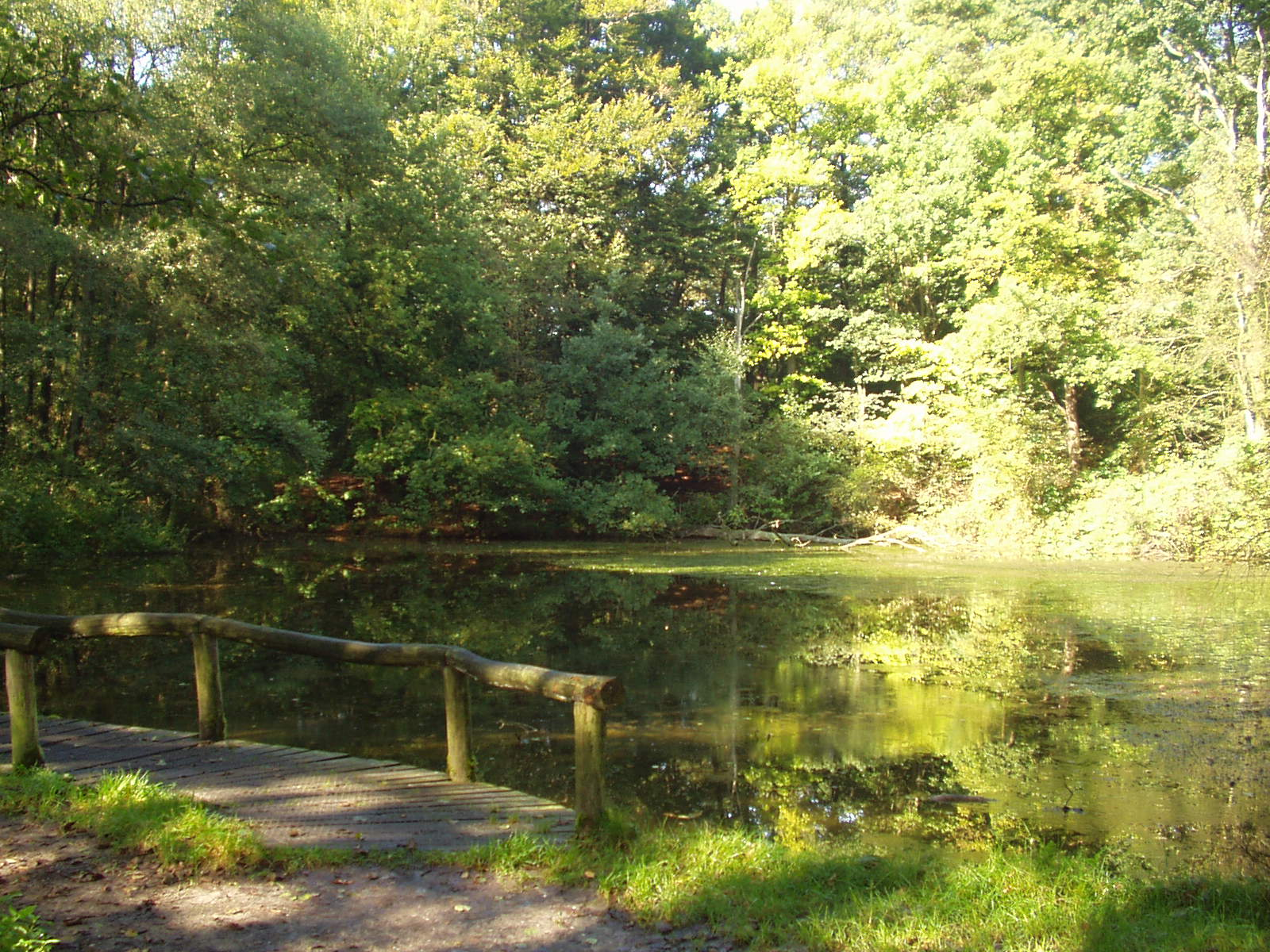
Springendal
