= Manderveen =

- Village
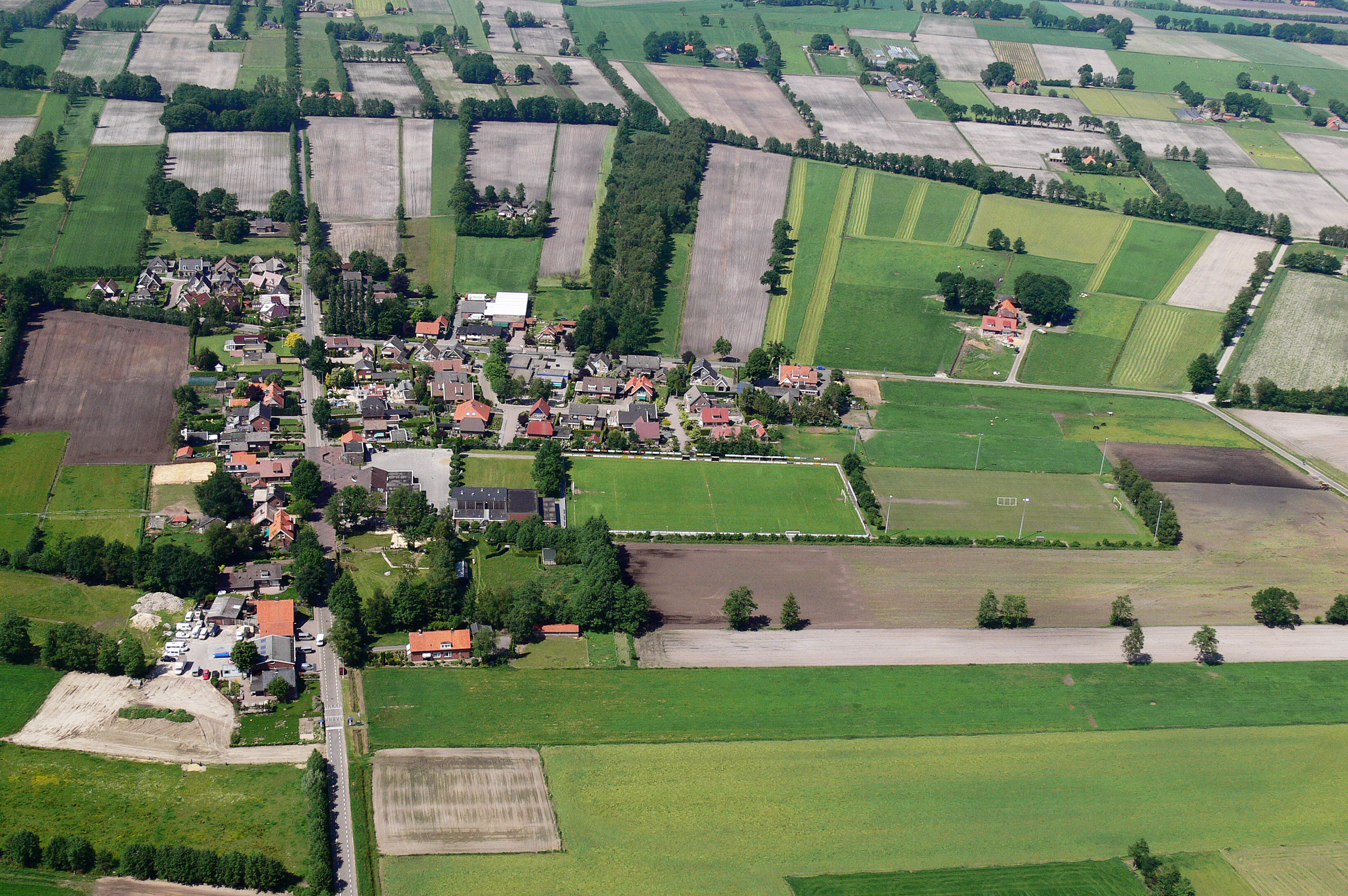
- Aerial view of Manderveen

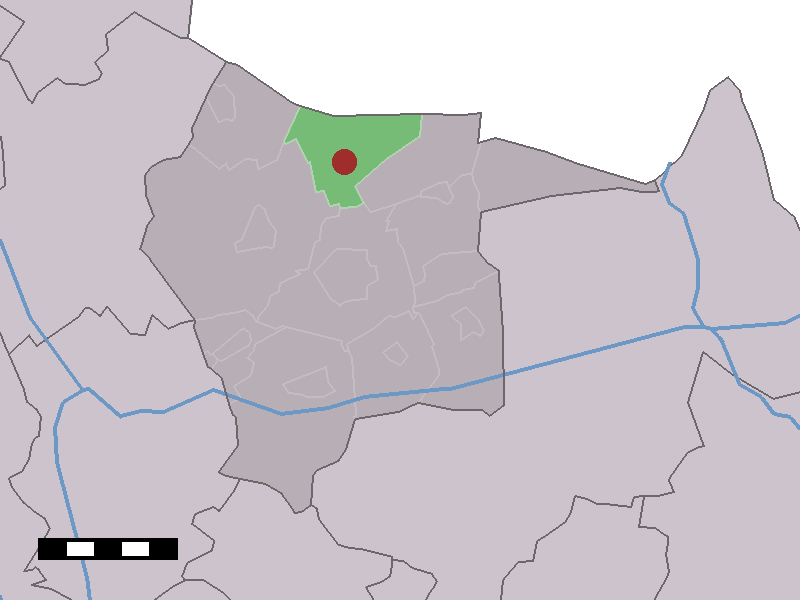
- The village (dark red) and the statistical district (light green) of Manderveen in the municipality of Tubbergen.

- Location in province of Overijssel in the Netherlands Manderveen (Netherlands)
- Coordinates: 52°27′N 6°47′E
- Country: Netherlands
- Province: Overijssel
- Municipality: Tubbergen

Area
  - Total: 10.06 km^{2} (3.88 sq mi)
- Elevation: 33 m (108 ft)

Population (2021)
  - Total: 625
  - Density: 62.1/km^{2} (161/sq mi)
- Demonym: Manderveners
- Time zone: UTC+1 (CET)
  - Summer (DST): UTC+2 (CEST)
- Postal code: 7664
- Dialing code: 0541

Manderveen (Tweants: Maanderven) is a village in the Dutch province of Overijssel. It is a part of the municipality of Tubbergen, and lies about 13 km northeast of Almelo.

The village was first mentioned in 1846 as Manderveen, which means peat area near Mander.
