= Albergen =

Albergen Albeargn (Twents)
- village
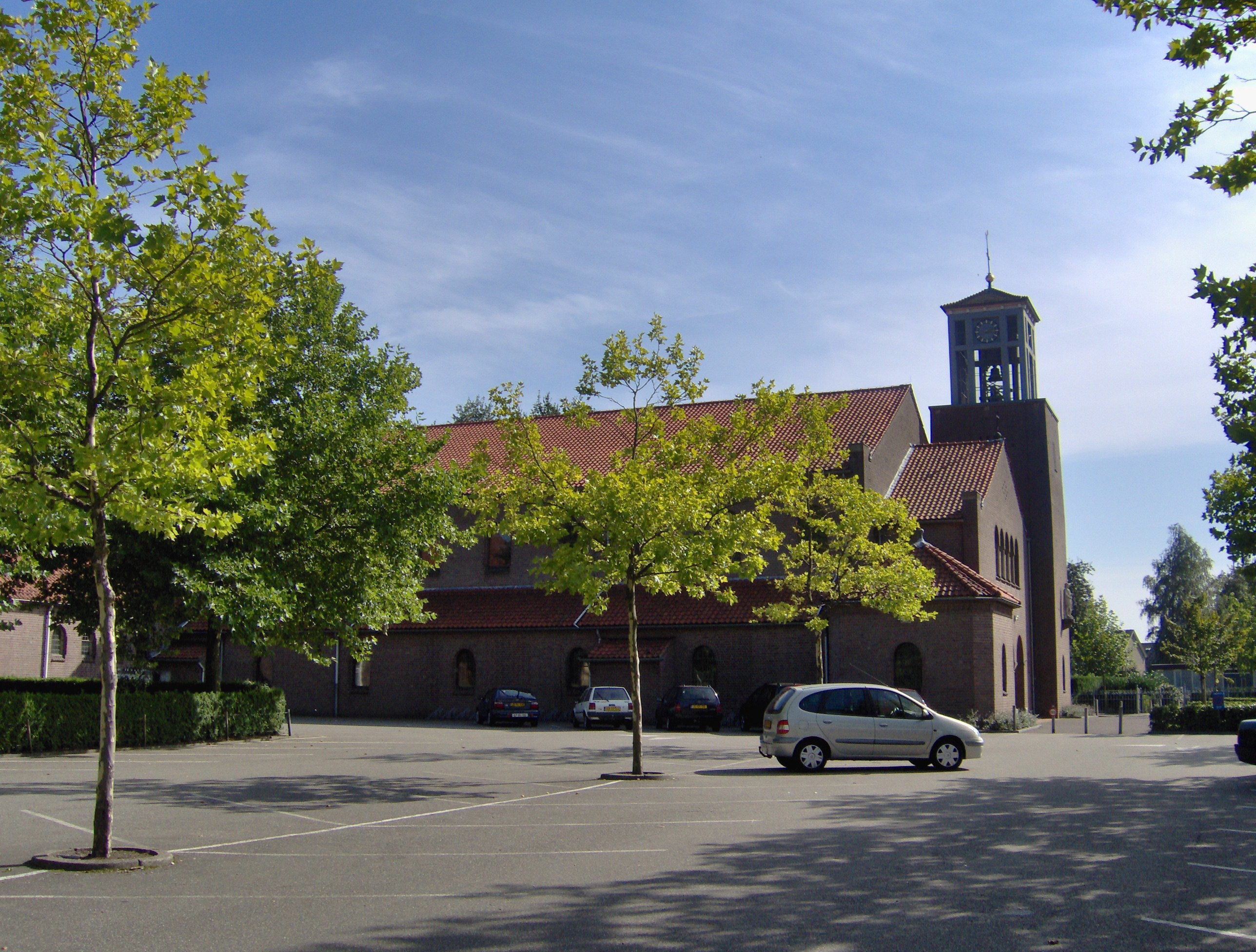
- The Catholic Church of Albergen

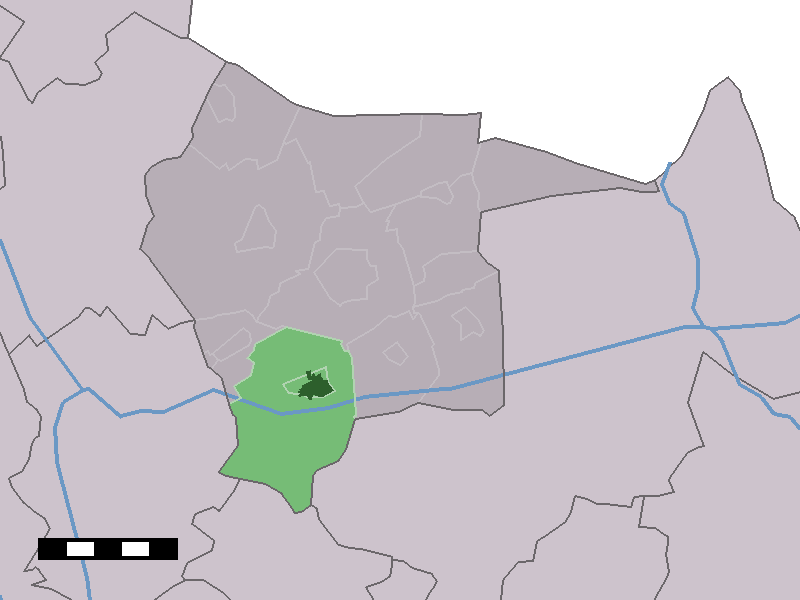
- The village centre (dark green) and the statistical district (light green) of Albergen in the municipality of Tubbergen.

- Location in the province of Overijssel Albergen (Netherlands)
- Coordinates: 52°22′18″N 6°45′43″E
- Country: Netherlands
- Province: Overijssel
- Municipality: Tubbergen

Area
  - Total: 22.10 km^{2} (8.53 sq mi)
- Elevation: 20 m (66 ft)

Population (2021)
  - Total: 3,595
  - Density: 162.7/km^{2} (421.3/sq mi)
- Demonyms: Albergenaren; Bukke, Bökke
- Time zone: UTC+1 (CET)
  - Summer (DST): UTC+2 (CEST)
- Postal code: 7665
- Dialing code: 0546
- Website: []

Albergen (Tweants: Albeargn) is a village in the Dutch province of Overijssel. It is a part of the municipality of Tubbergen, and lies about 7 km east of Almelo.

== Services ==
Albergen has few services, because a lot of services can be found in bigger towns surrounding Albergen. However there is a church, Sint Pancratiuskerk, a primary school, a supermarket and a gym.

== Culture ==
Albergen is known for its carnival and its Whitsun Fair. The carnival parade happens to be the first one in the year in Twente. During the Whitsunday Fair, at Pentecost, famous Dutch artists perform, such as Bløf, Van Dik Hout, and Di-rect.

The town's most notable current inhabitant is racing driver Bent Viscaal.
