= Tubbergen =

Tubbergen Tubbige (Twents)
- Municipality
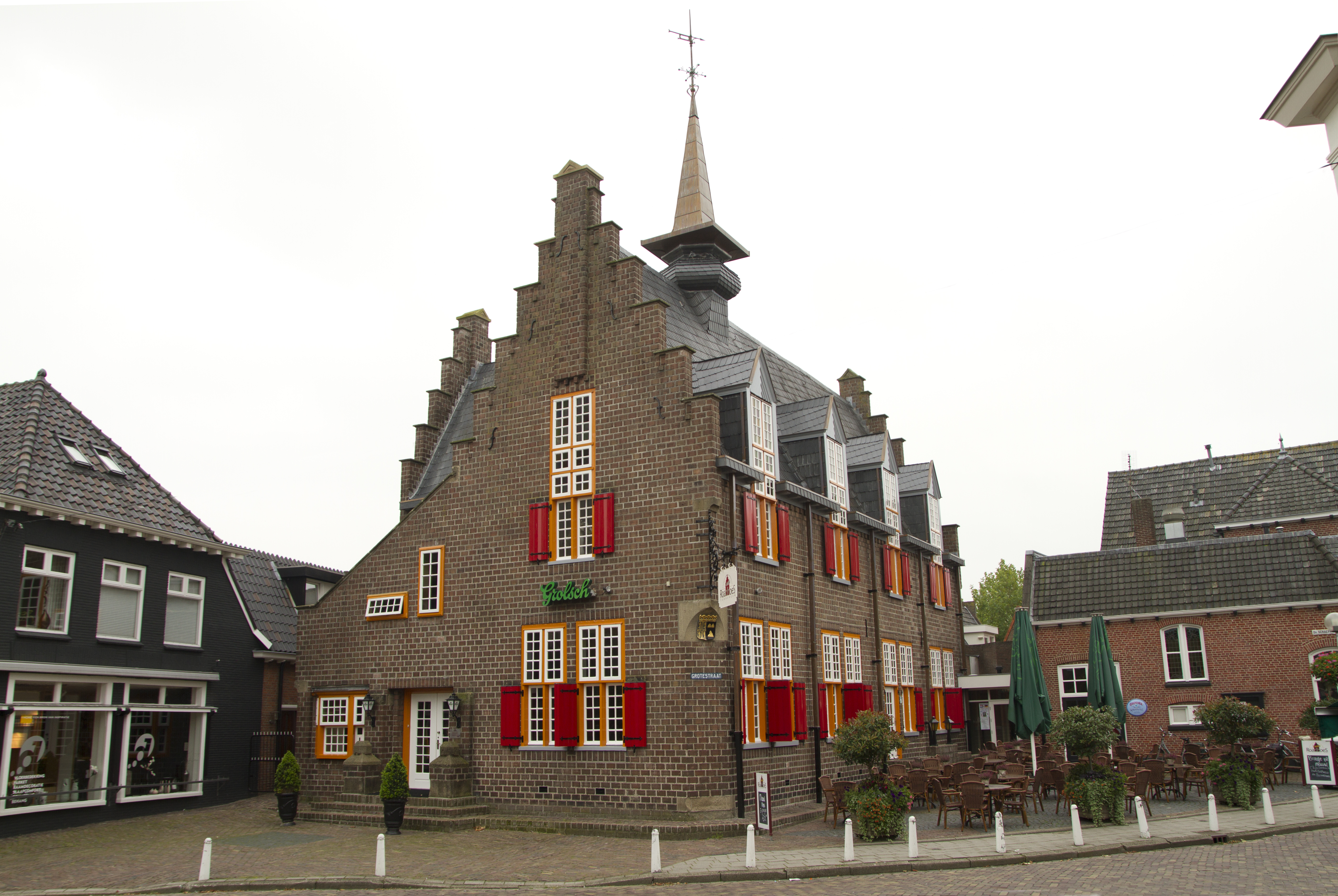
- Former city hall of Tubbergen

- Flag Coat of arms

- Location in Overijssel
- Coordinates: 52°24′N 6°47′E
- Country: Netherlands
- Province: Overijssel

Government
  - Body: Municipal council
  - Mayor: Anko Postma (No party)

Area
  - Total: 147.44 km^{2} (56.93 sq mi)
  - Land: 147.00 km^{2} (56.76 sq mi)
  - Water: 0.44 km^{2} (0.17 sq mi)
- Elevation: 22 m (72 ft)

Population (January 2021)
  - Total: 21,315
  - Density: 145/km^{2} (380/sq mi)
- Demonym(s): Tubbergenaar, Tubberger
- Time zone: UTC+1 (CET)
  - Summer (DST): UTC+2 (CEST)
- Postcode: 7614–7619, 7650–7669, 7679
- Area code: 0541, 0546
- Website: www.tubbergen.nl
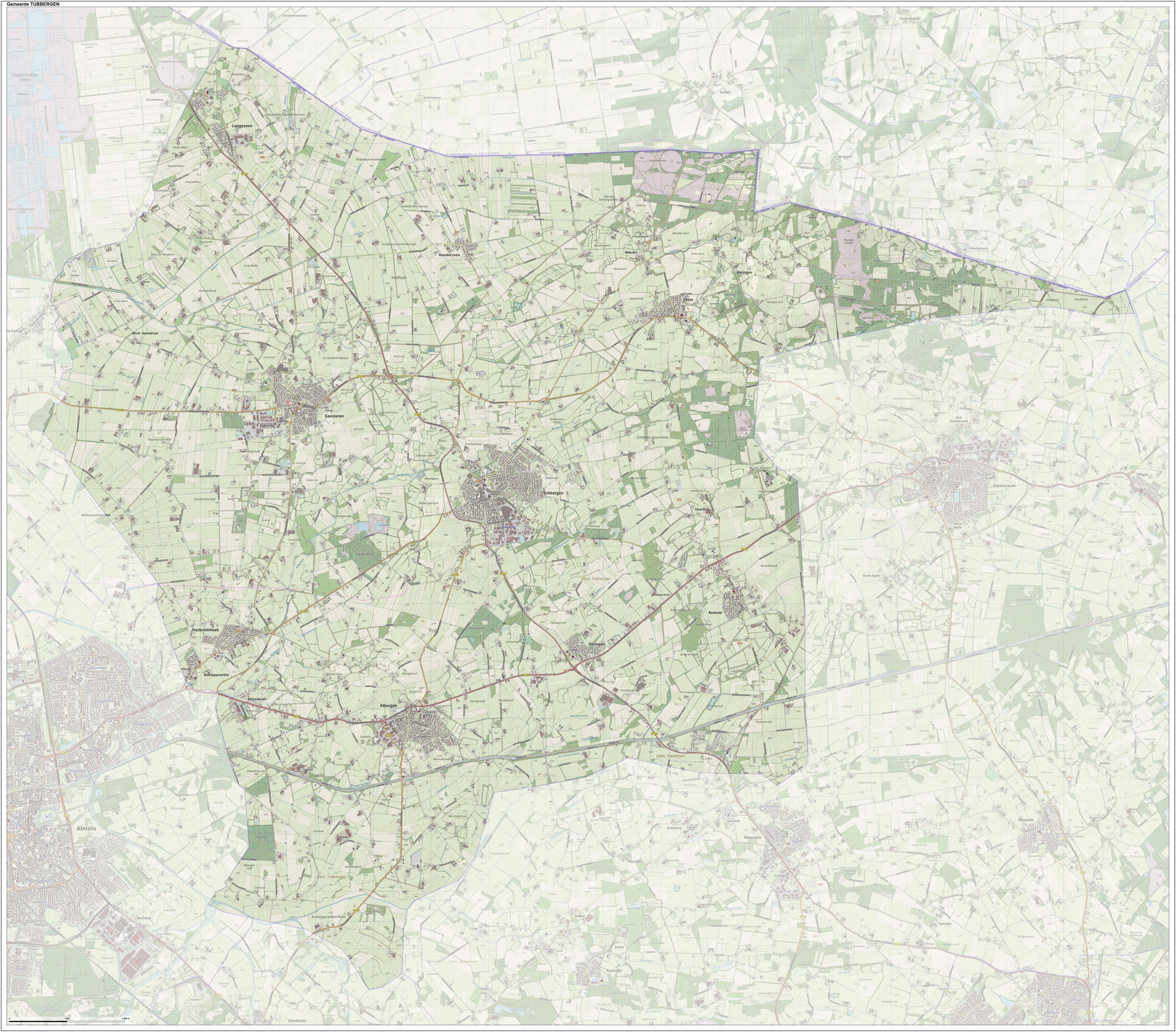
- Map of the municipality of Tubbergen, June 2015

Tubbergen (Dutch: [tʏˈbɛrɣə(n)]; Tweants: Tubbige) is a municipality and town in the province of Overijssel in the eastern Netherlands.

== Geography ==
The following population centres can be found in Tubbergen:

- Albergen
- Fleringen
- Geesteren
- Haarle
- Harbrinkhoek
- Hezingen
- Langeveen
- Mander
- Manderveen
- Mariaparochie
- Reutum
- Tubbergen
- Vasse

== Politics ==
After the 2026 municipal elections, the 19-seat municipal council of Tubbergen was composed as follows.

Party	Popular vote		Seats
Party	Votes	%	Seats
Christian Democratic Appeal (CDA)	4,439	42.45%	8 / 19
Keerpunt22	2,741	26.21%	5 / 19
Gemeentebelangen / VVD (GB/VVD)	2,110	20.18%	4 / 19
GroenLinks / Labour Party (PvdA)	1,168	11.17%	2 / 19

Tubbergen has one of the largest shares of Christian Democratic Appeal voters across the Netherlands.

== Society ==
The municipality has a high birth rate and the lowest divorce rate in the Netherlands.

In the 2009 survey by the Algemeen Dagblad, Tubbergen had the lowest crime rate of all municipalities in the Netherlands. According to the mayor, this is primarily because of a strong sense of community.

== Notable people ==
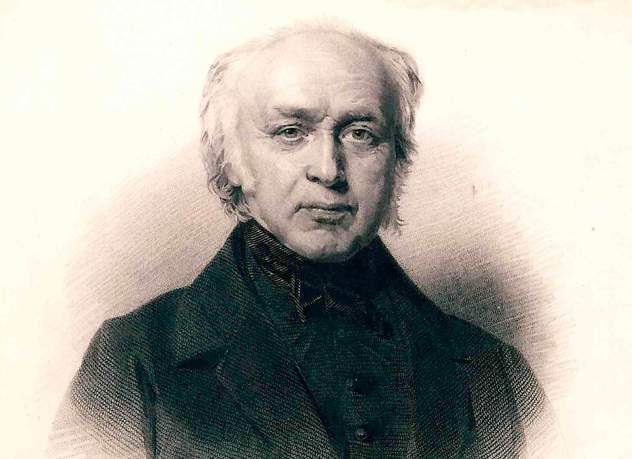
C M F von Bönninghausen, ca. 1820

- Clemens Maria Franz von Bönninghausen (1785 near Fleringen – 1864) a lawyer, Dutch and Prussian civil servant, agriculturalist, botanist, physician and pioneer in the field of homeopathy
- Herman Schaepman (1844 in Tubbergen – 1903) a Dutch priest, politician and poet
- Gerard Bruggink (1917 in Tubbergen – 2005) a Dutch pilot of the Royal Netherlands East Indies Army Air Force

=== Sport ===
- Berny Boxem-Lenferink (1948 in Tubbergen – 2023), middle-distance runner, competed at the 1972 Summer Olympics
- Gerco Schröder (born 1978 in Tubbergen), show jumping equestrian, participated at the 2004 Summer Olympics
- Nicole Oude Luttikhuis (born 1997 in Harbrinkhoek), volleyball player, participated in the Dutch national women's volleyball team

== Gallery ==
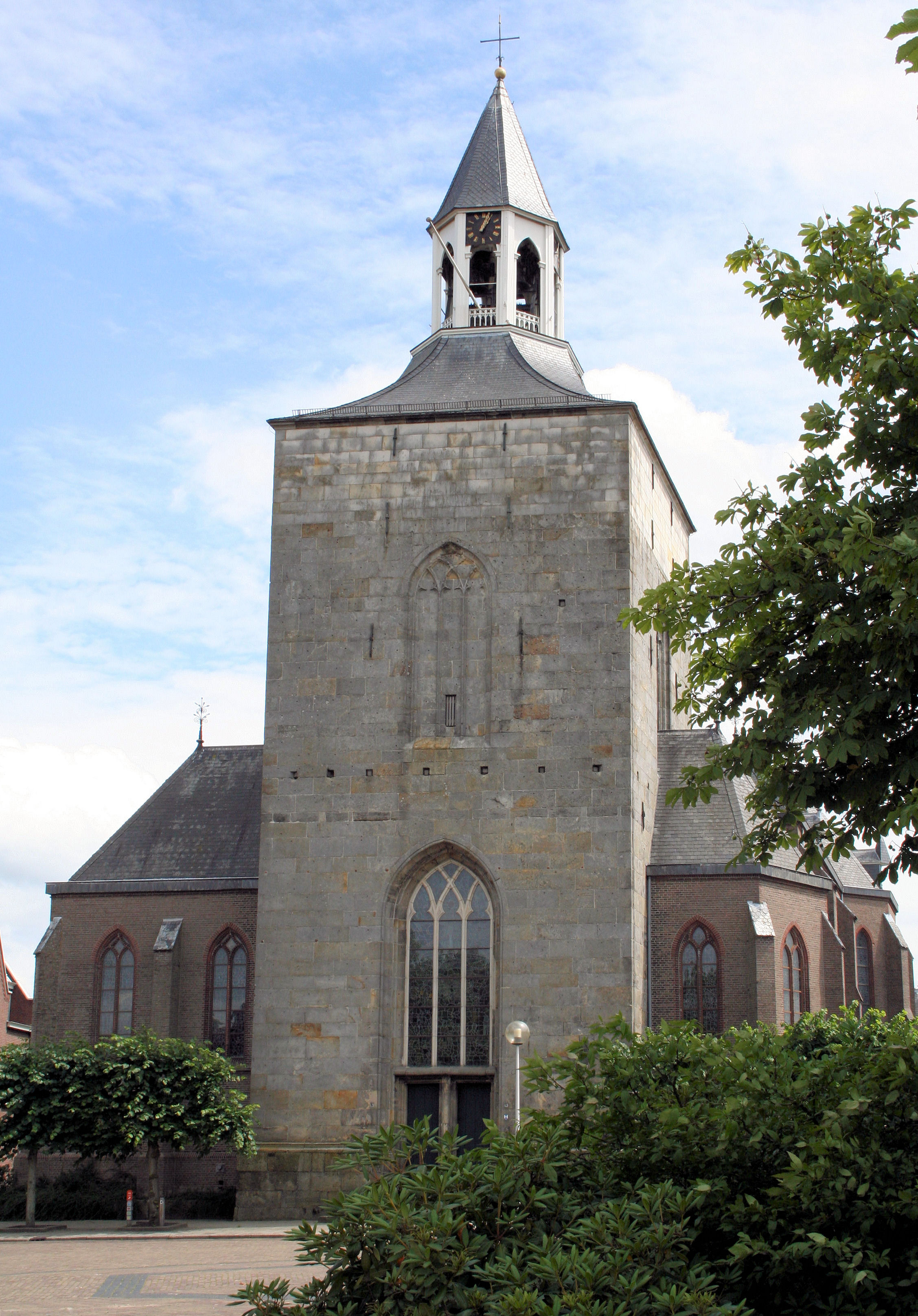
Sint-Pancratius basiliek, Tubbergen

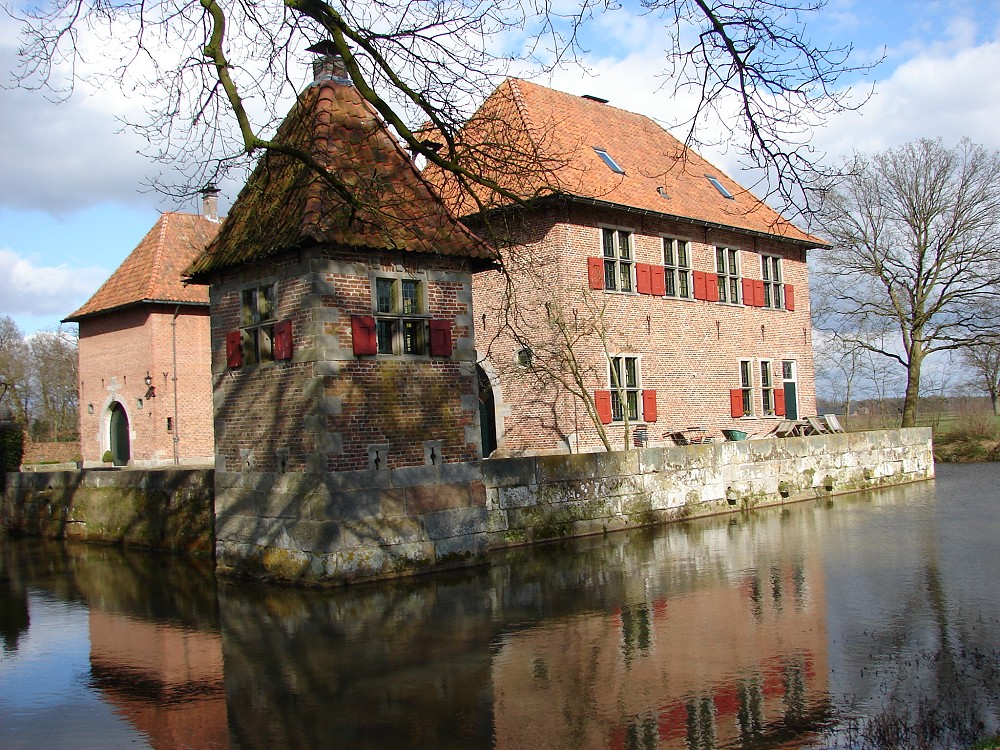
House in Breckelenkamp

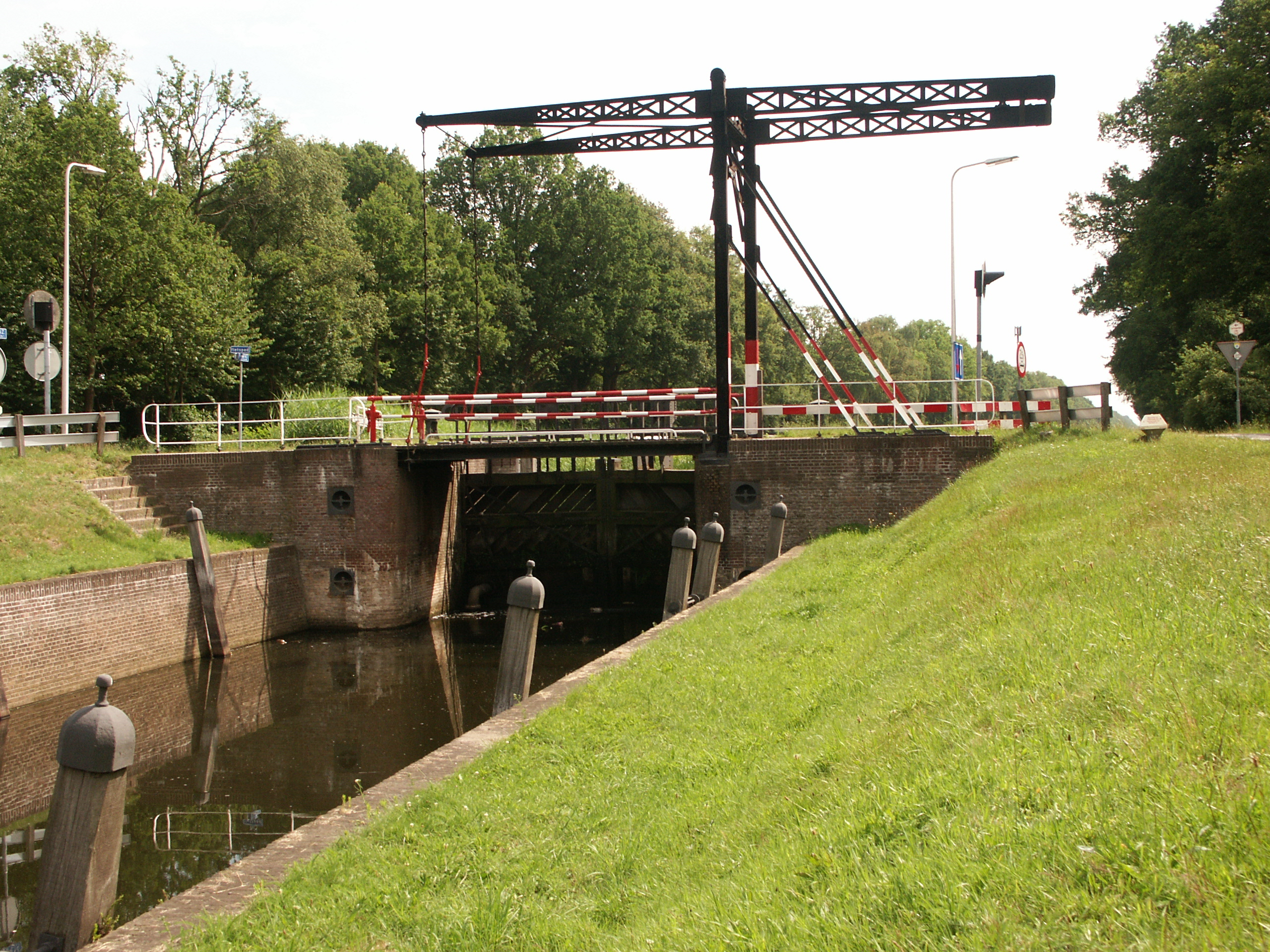
Reutum, lock on the Almelo-Nordhorn canal

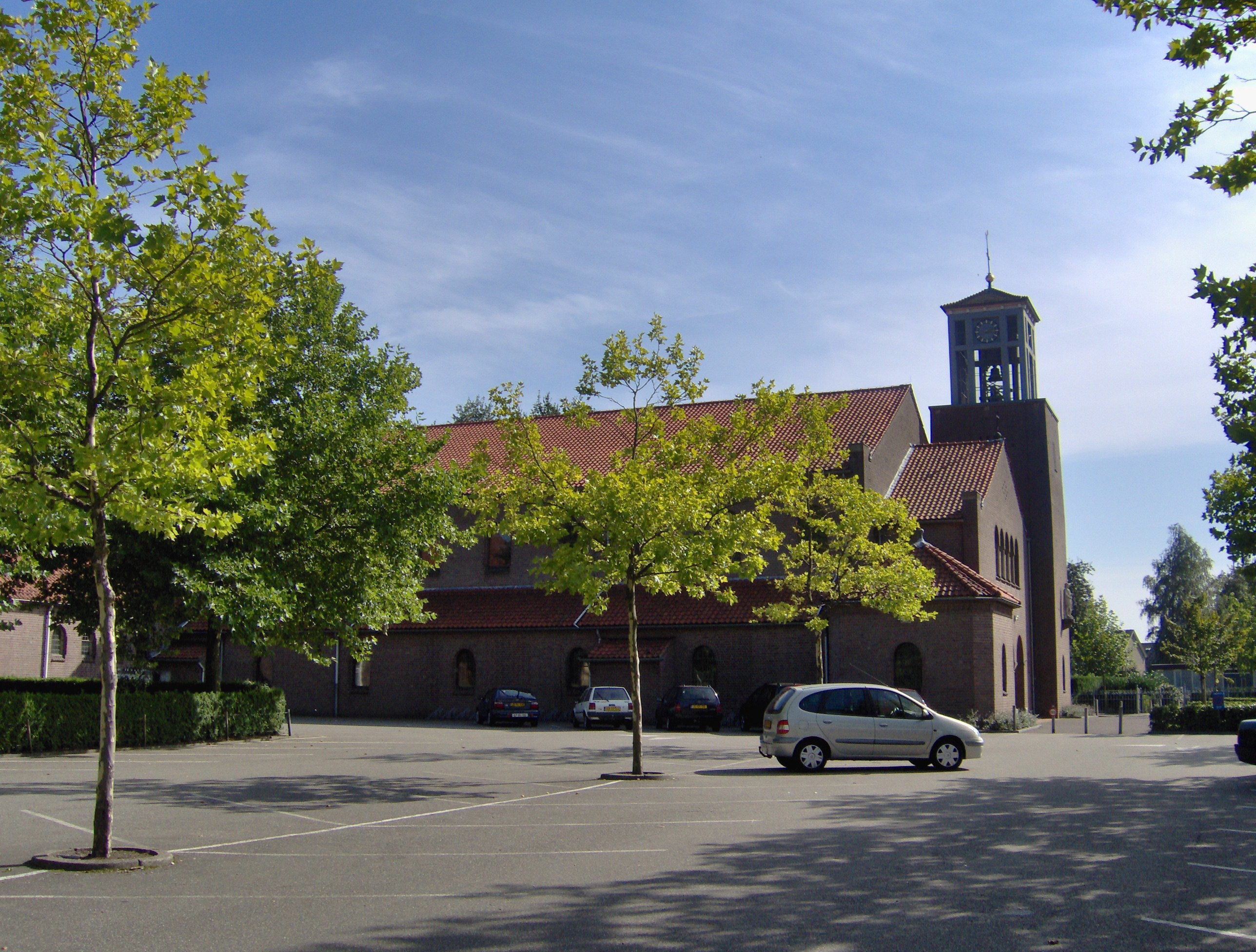
Sint Pancratiuskerk Albergen

== See also ==
- Jake Van Tubbergen (born 1998), American basketball player in the Israeli Basketball Premier League
