= Langeveen =

Langeveen T Langevenne (Twents)
- Village
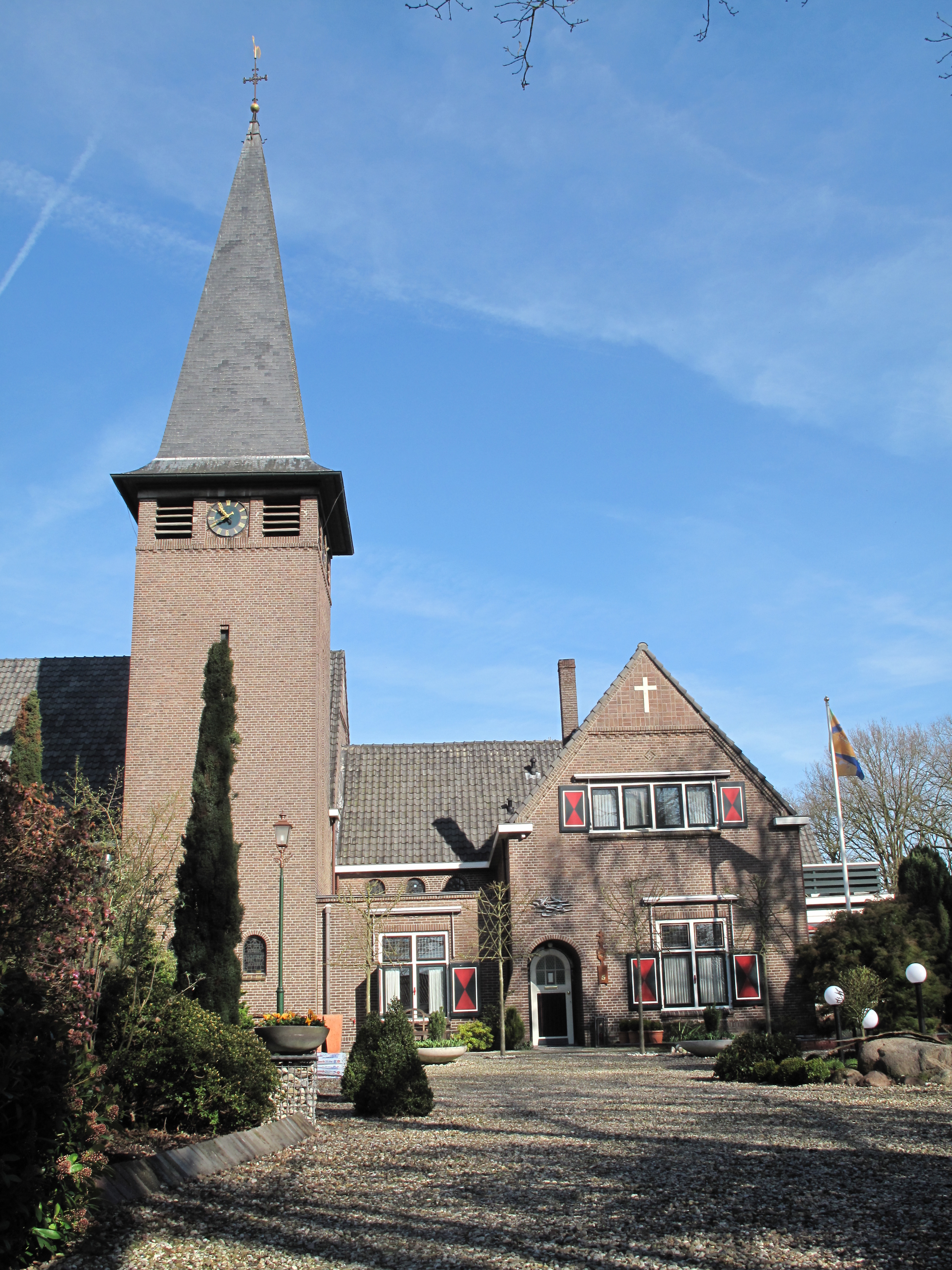
- Church of Langeveen

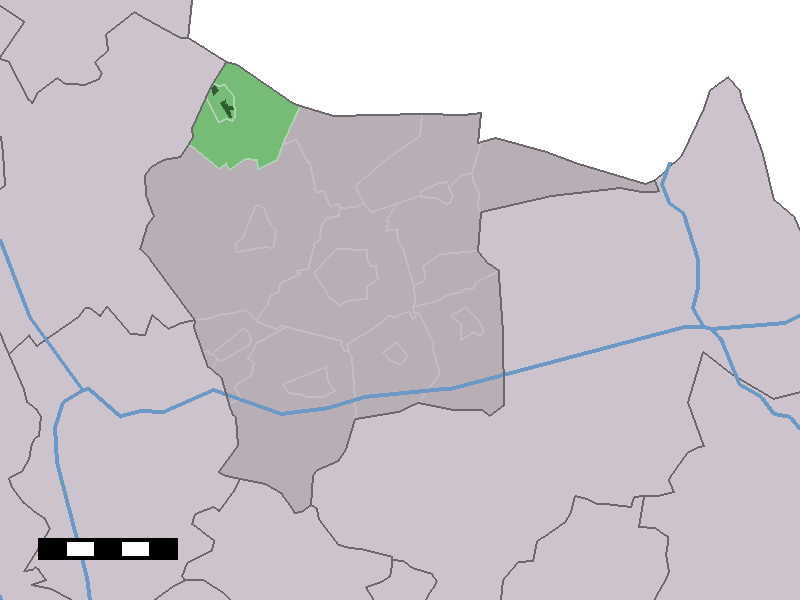
- The village centre (dark green) and the statistical district (light green) of Langeveen in the municipality of Tubbergen.

- Location in province of Overijssel in the Netherlands Langeveen (Netherlands)
- Coordinates: 52°28′N 6°43′E
- Country: Netherlands
- Province: Overijssel
- Municipality: Tubbergen

Area
  - Total: 9.95 km^{2} (3.84 sq mi)
- Elevation: 16 m (52 ft)

Population (2021)
  - Total: 1,285
  - Density: 129/km^{2} (334/sq mi)
- Demonym(s): Langeveners, Törftrappers
- Time zone: UTC+1 (CET)
  - Summer (DST): UTC+2 (CEST)
- Postal code: 7679
- Dialing code: 0546

Langeveen (Tweants: T Langevenne) is a village in the Dutch province of Overijssel. It is a part of the municipality of Tubbergen, and lies about 13 km north of Almelo.

It was first mentioned in 1851 as Langeveen, and means "long bog". In 1803, the first person received permission to settle in the area. In 1843, a little church was built. A little Lourdes Chapel was built in the village.
