= Mander, Overijssel =

Mander Maander (Twents)
- Hamlet
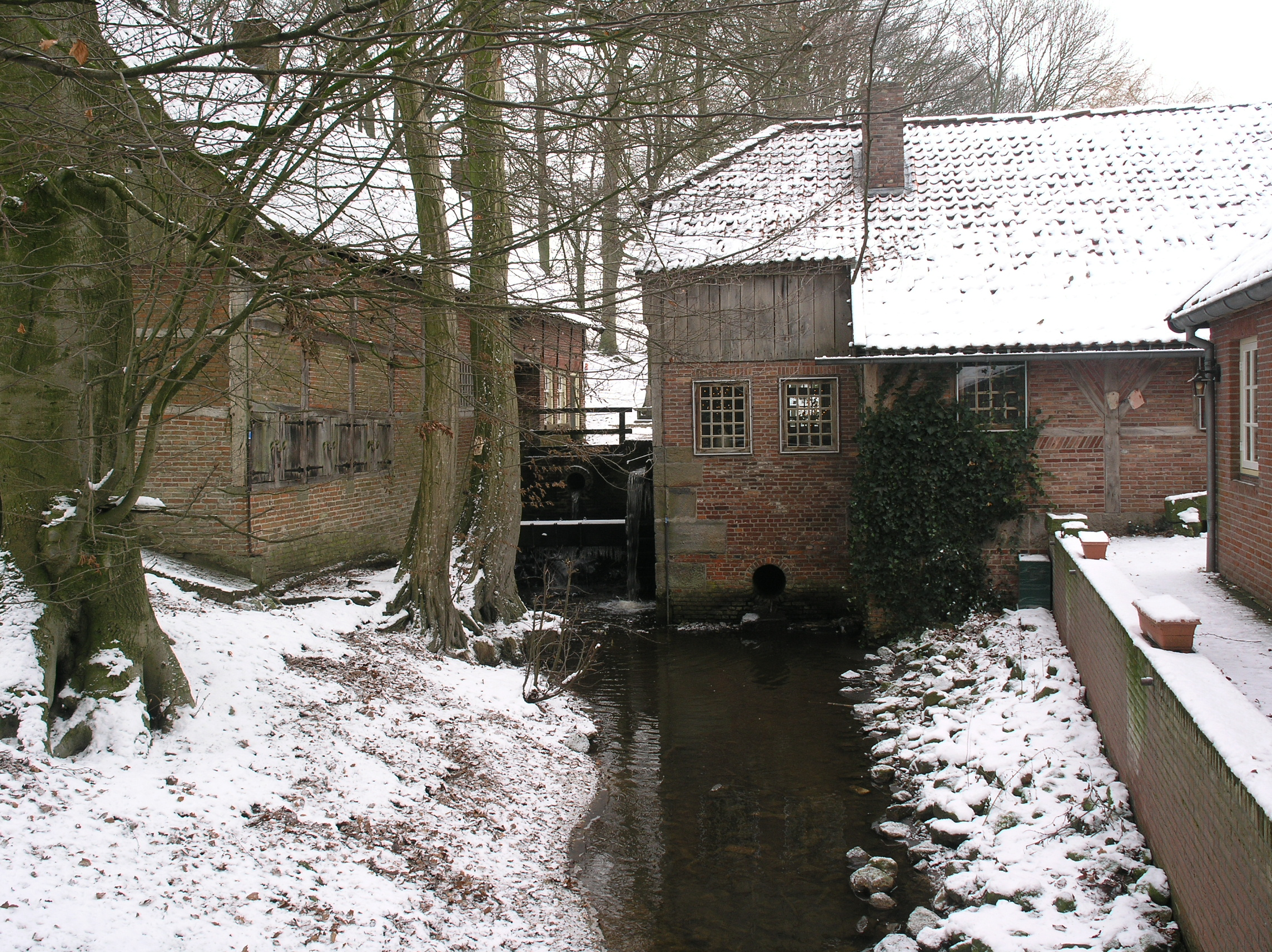
- Bels' watermill

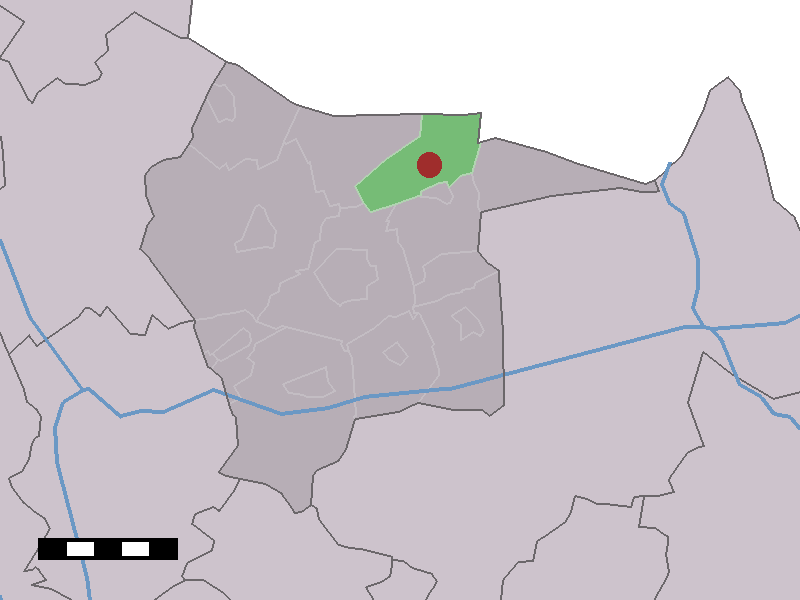
- The village (dark red) and the statistical district (light green) of Mander in the municipality of Tubbergen.

- Location in province of Overijssel in the Netherlands Mander (Netherlands)
- Coordinates: 52°27′N 6°50′E
- Country: Netherlands
- Province: Overijssel
- Municipality: Tubbergen

Area
  - Total: 10.06 km^{2} (3.88 sq mi)
- Elevation: 33 m (108 ft)

Population (2021)
  - Total: 625
  - Density: 62.1/km^{2} (161/sq mi)
- Demonym: Grupndrieters
- Time zone: UTC+1 (CET)
  - Summer (DST): UTC+2 (CEST)
- Postal code: 7664
- Dialing code: 0541

Mander (Tweants: Maander) is a village in the Dutch province of Overijssel. It is a part of the municipality of Tubbergen, and lies about 15 km northeast of Almelo.

It was first mentioned in 797 as Manheri. The etymology is unclear. In 1840, it was home 440 people.

Among the points of special interest are two watermills, some hidden tumuli, and the land art project 'Mander Circles' by Paul de Kort. The crop circles are old, and have not been made by aliens, but were constructed in the 1920s by Jannink to improve efficiency. The circles had become overgrown, and were restored in 2000. They are best observed from the air.

== Gallery ==
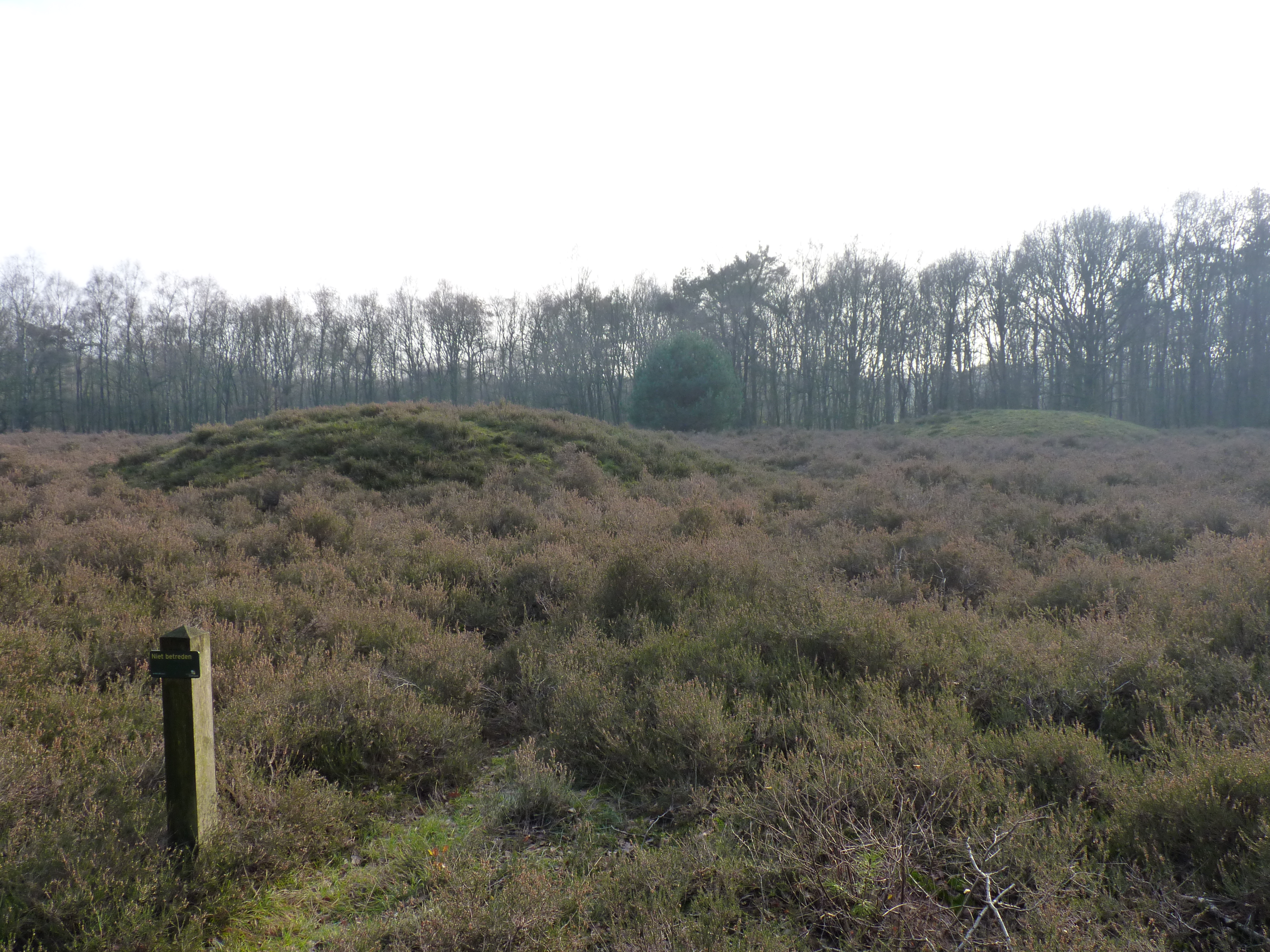
Tumuli near mander

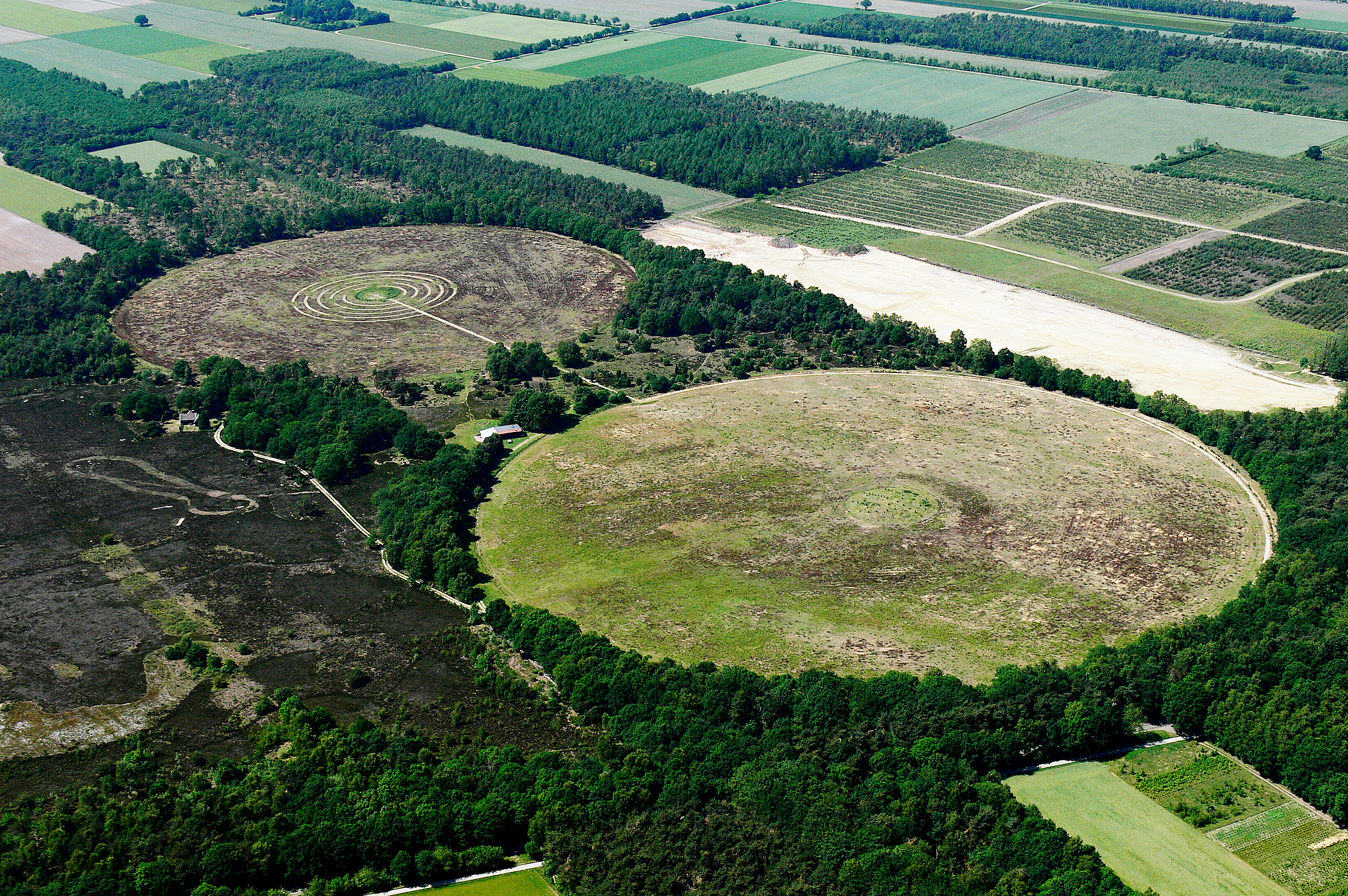
Mander circles

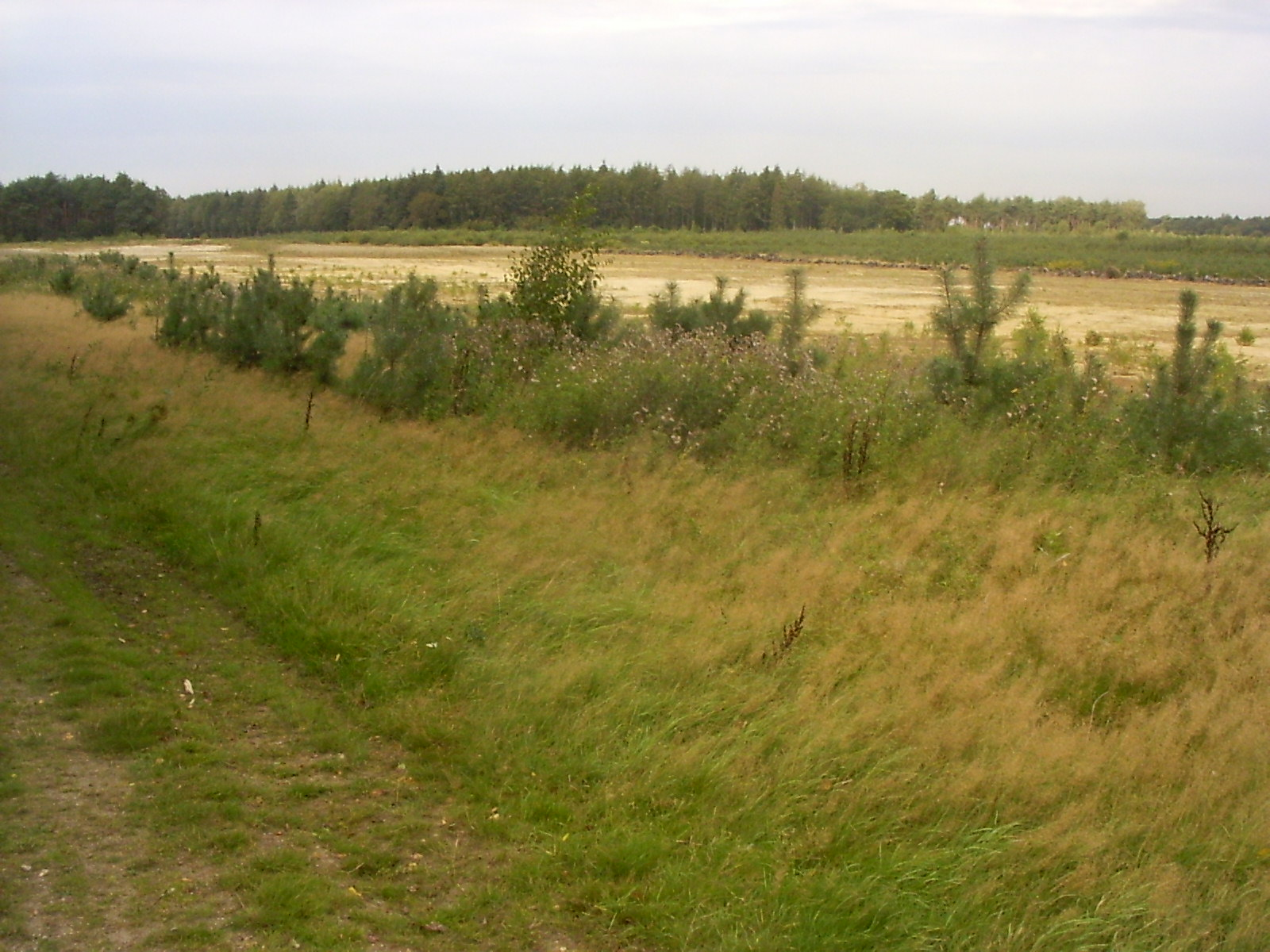
Mander circles

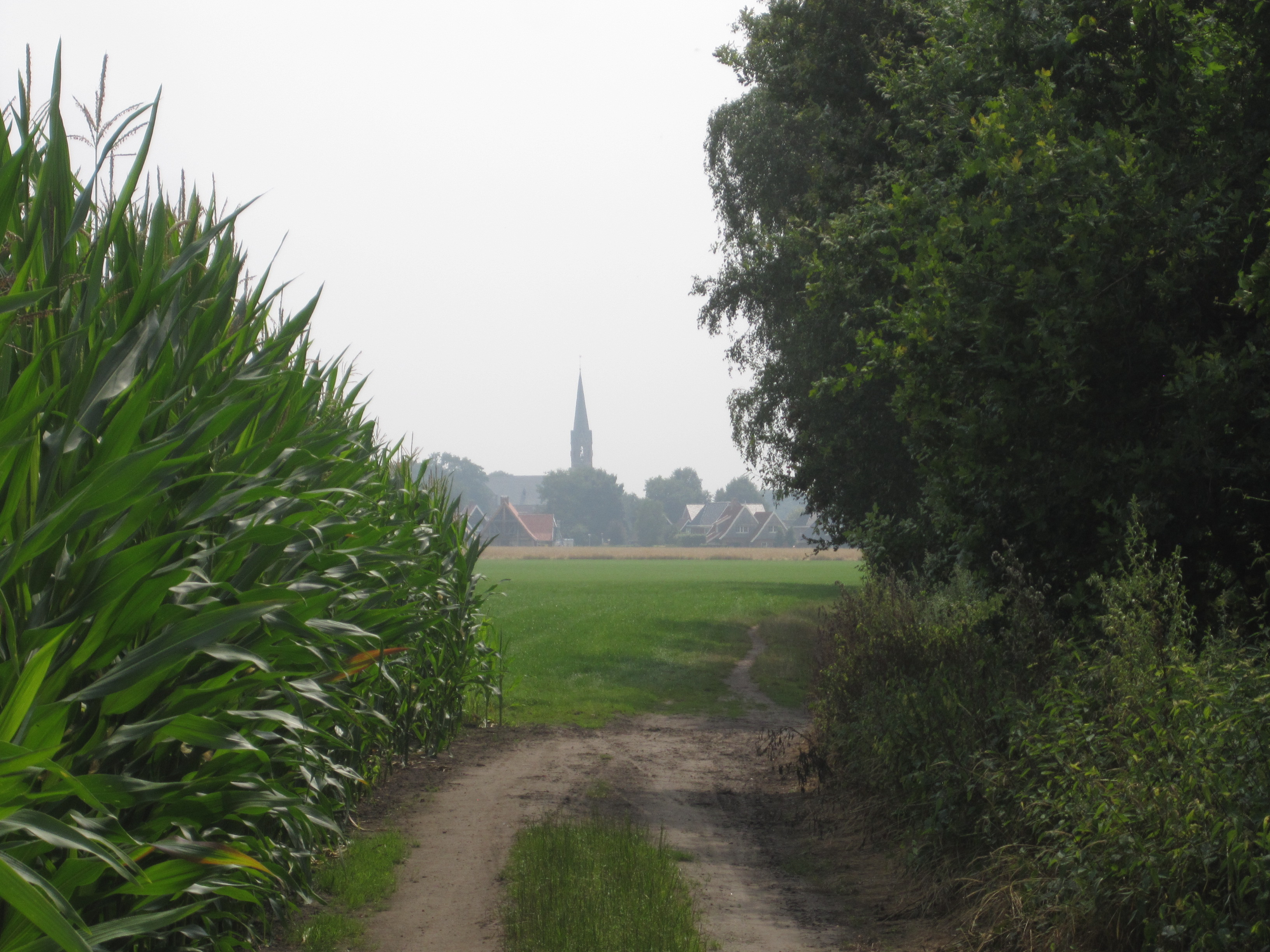
View on Mander
