= Vasse, Netherlands =

Vasse Vas (Twents)
- Village
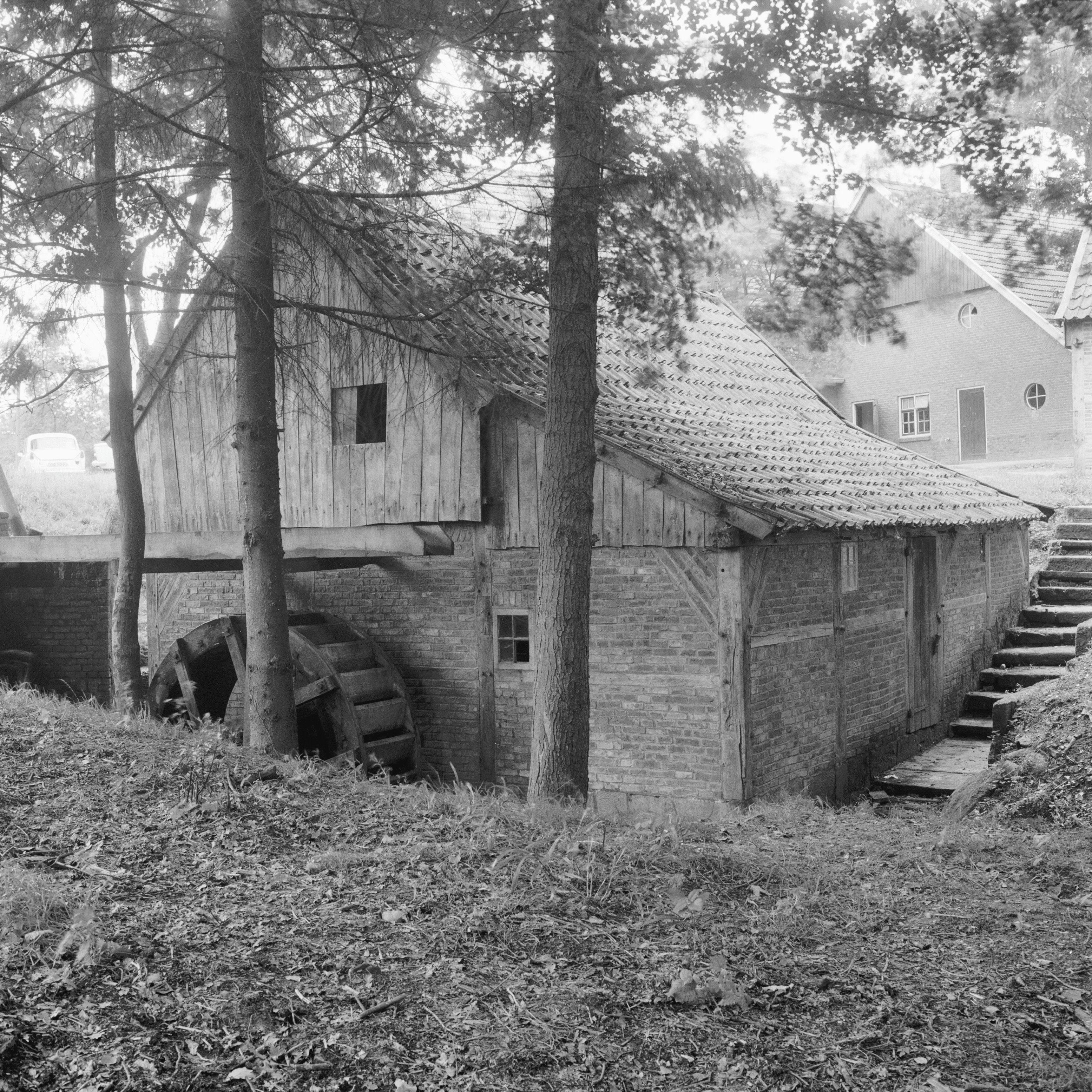
- Watermill de Mast

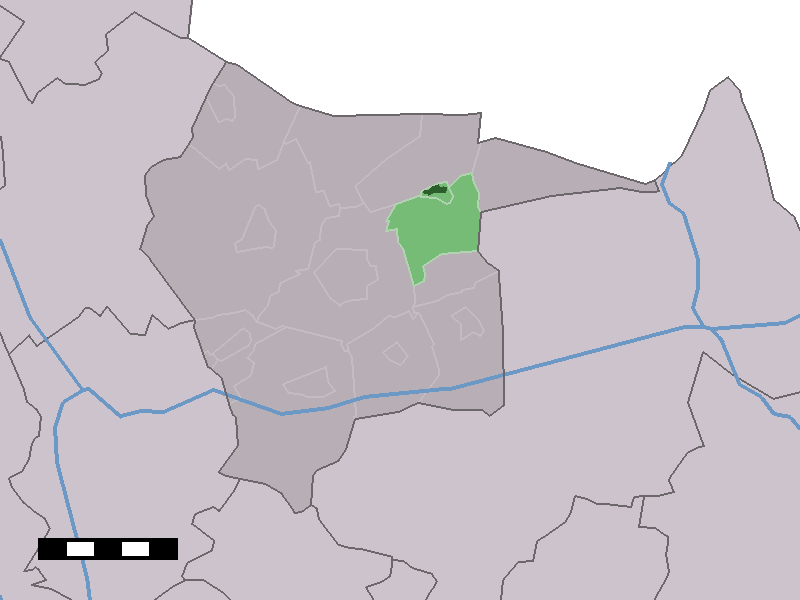
- The village centre (dark green) and the statistical district (light green) of Vasse in the municipality of Tubbergen.

- Location in province of Overijssel in the Netherlands Vasse (Netherlands)
- Coordinates: 52°26′N 6°50′E
- Country: Netherlands
- Province: Overijssel
- Municipality: Tubbergen

Area
  - Total: 25.88 km^{2} (9.99 sq mi)
- Elevation: 34 m (112 ft)

Population (2021)
  - Total: 1,595
  - Density: 61.63/km^{2} (159.6/sq mi)
- Demonym(s): Vassenaren, Motheupe, Spekscheters
- Time zone: UTC+1 (CET)
  - Summer (DST): UTC+2 (CEST)
- Postal code: 7661
- Dialing code: 0541

Vasse (Tweants: Vas) is a village in the Dutch province of Overijssel. It is a part of the municipality of Tubbergen, and lies about 15 km northeast of Almelo.

== History ==
Vasse developed as an esdorp along the Vasser Es River. It was first mentioned in the late 10th century as "in Fahsi". The etymology is unclear. In 1803, it became an independent parish. In 1840, it was home to 298 people. In 1861, the Catholic church was built in Vasse, and a village developed around it.

Some rural farms and barns are good examples of the traditional building style in Twente which includes variations of the Low German house. The village is a popular destiny as a starting point for hiking or biking trips because of the beauty and variety of the nature surrounding it. Local hotels and restaurants are primarily oriented towards this type of tourists.

The tar pits of Vasse were a former sand excavation in which chemical waste was dumped in the 1960s and 1970s. It is one of the largest contaminated areas of the Netherlands. Given the expenditure to clean it up, the area is contained to prevent leakage.

== Notable people ==
- Thijs Houwing (born 1981), professional footballer

== Gallery ==
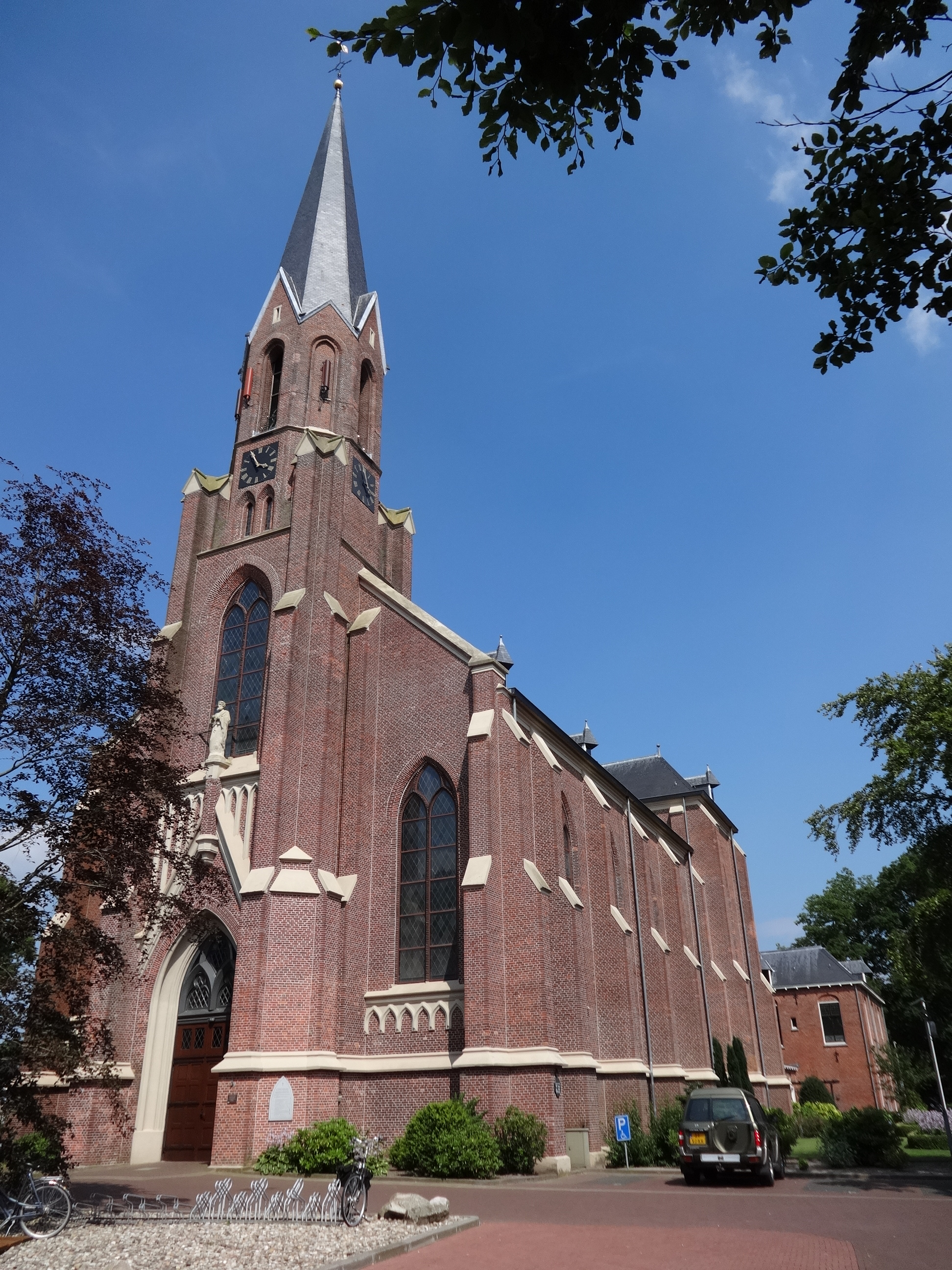
St.Joseph and Pancratius

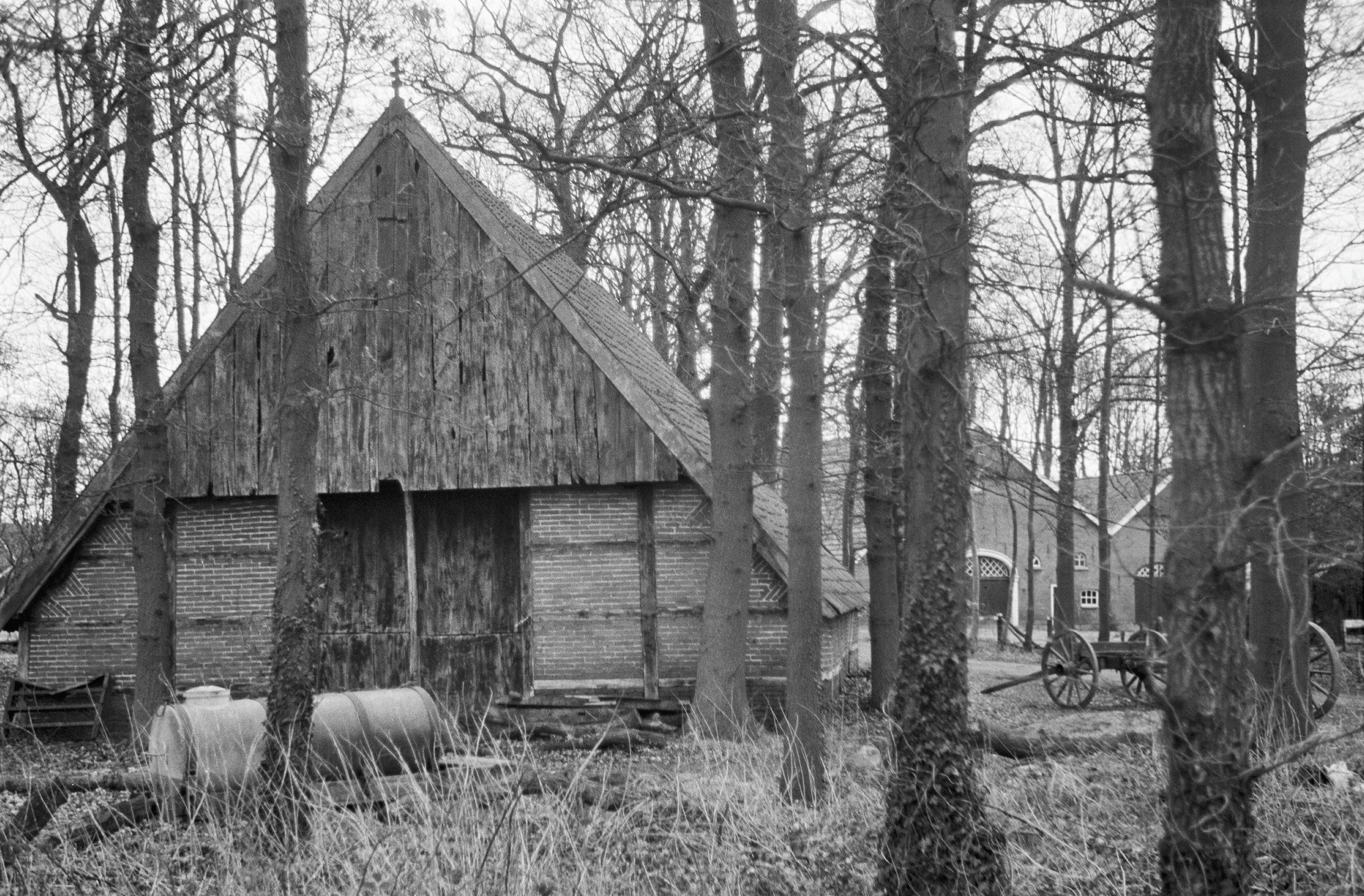
Timber famed barn

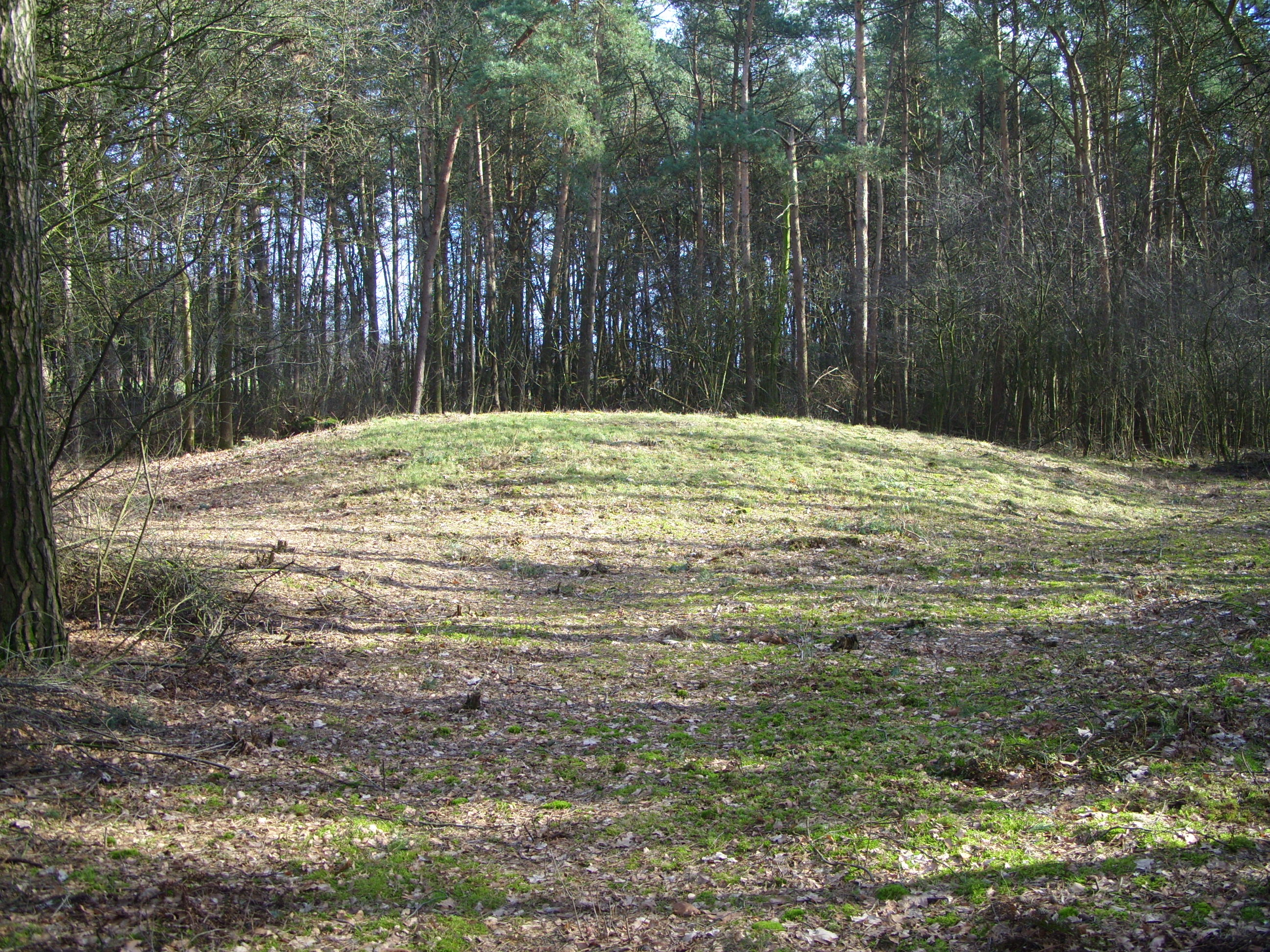
Restored tumulus

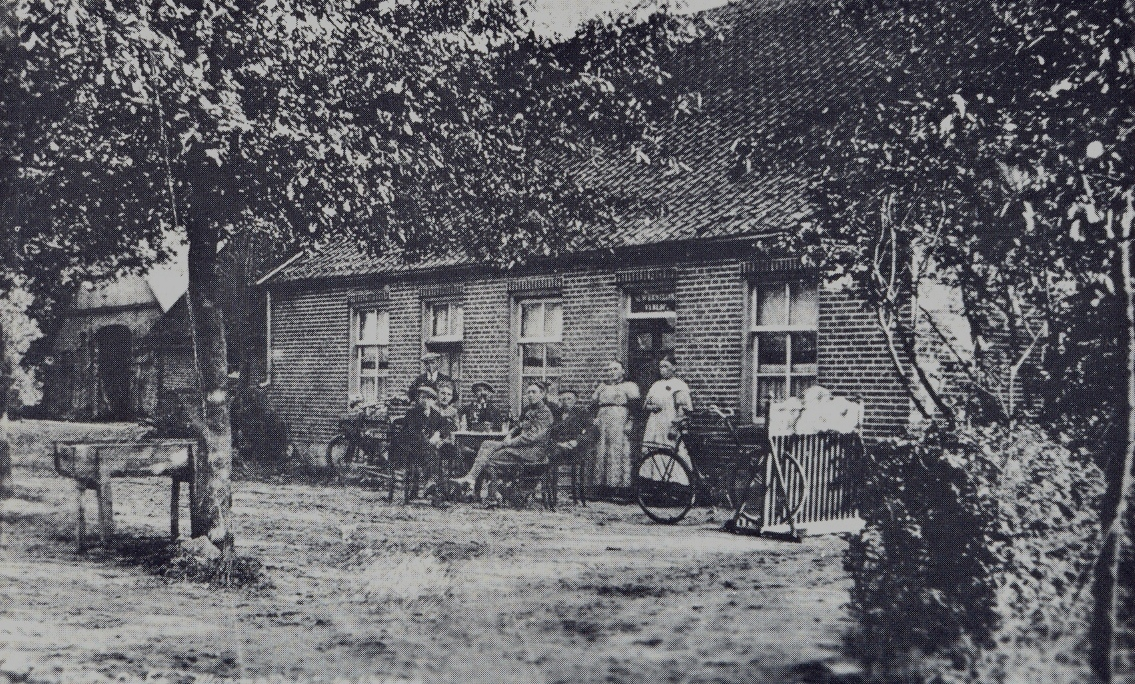
Pub Wermelink owned by Aunt Sien (c. 1915)
