= Harbrinkhoek =

Harbrinkhoek Haarbig (Twents)
- Village
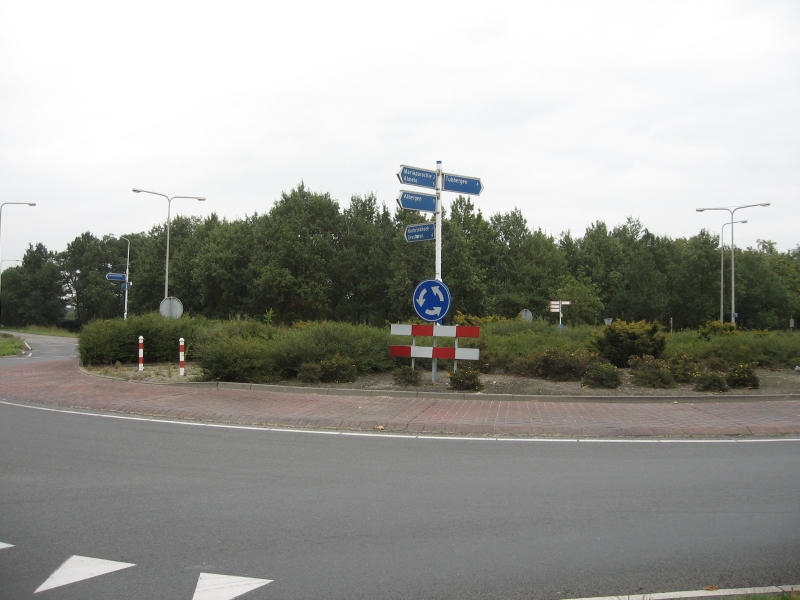
- Roundabout in Harbrinkhoek

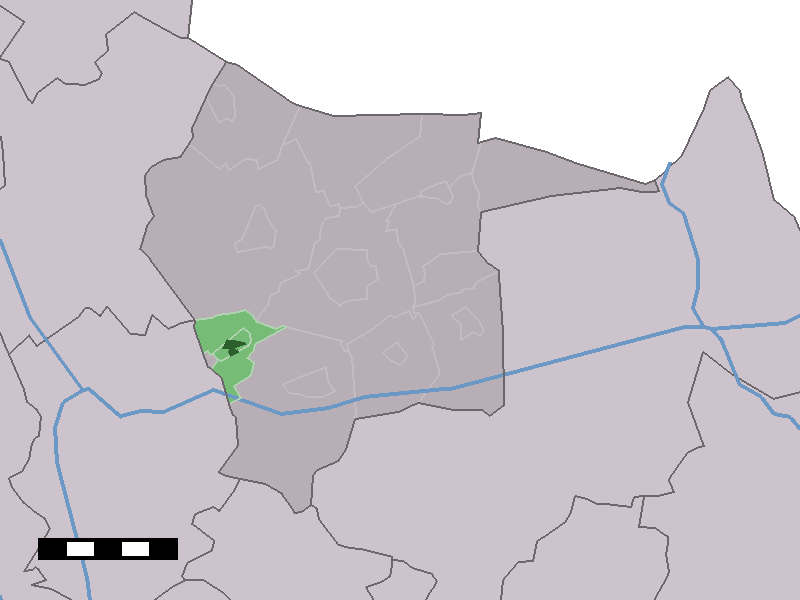
- The town centre (dark green) and the statistical district (light green) of Harbrinkhoek in the municipality of Tubbergen.

- Location in province of Overijssel in the Netherlands Harbrinkhoek (Netherlands)
- Coordinates: 52°23′N 6°43′E
- Country: Netherlands
- Province: Overijssel
- Municipality: Tubbergen

Area
  - Total: 5.12 km^{2} (1.98 sq mi)
- Elevation: 13 m (43 ft)

Population (2021)
  - Total: 1,880
  - Density: 367/km^{2} (951/sq mi)
- Demonym(s): Harbrinkhoekers, Grupndrieters
- Time zone: UTC+1 (CET)
  - Summer (DST): UTC+2 (CEST)
- Postal code: 7615
- Dialing code: 0546

Harbrinkhoek (Tweants: Haarbig) is a village in the Dutch province of Overijssel. It is a part of the municipality of Tubbergen, and lies about 5 km northeast of Almelo.

It was first mentioned in 1844 as Harbrink, and means "settlement of the people of Harbert (person)". In the 1950s, the hamlet turned into a little village. The village is twinned with Mariaparochie, but both still have separate place name signs, statistical entries and postal codes.
