= Tweants dialect =

Group of Westphalian, Dutch Low Saxon dialects

Tweants
- Pronunciation: [tʋɛːn(t)s]
- Native to: Netherlands
- Region: Twente, Overijssel
- Native speakers: 330,000 (2009)
- Language family: Indo-European: Germanic; West Germanic; North Sea Germanic; Low German; Low Saxon; Westphalian; Tweants

Official status
- Official language in: Netherlands (as part of Low Saxon)

Language codes
- ISO 639-3: twd
- Glottolog: twen1241

Tweants (Tweants pronunciation: [tʋɛːn(t)s]; Dutch: Twents [tʋɛnts]) is a group of non-standardised Dutch Low Saxon dialects of the Low German language.

It is spoken daily by approximately 62% of the population of Twente, a region in the eastern Dutch province of Overijssel bordering on Germany.

Tweants is part of the larger Low Saxon dialect continuum, spreading from the Veluwe region in the middle of the Netherlands to the German-Polish border. As a consequence, it shares many characteristics with surrounding dialects, such as Sallaans and Achterhooks in the Netherlands, and Westmünsterländisch in Germany.

All towns and villages in Twente have their own local, but mutually intelligible variety. Due to this fragmentation and lack of a standard variety, many speakers of Tweants call it by the locality their variety is from (e.g. a person from Almelo would say they speak "Almeloos" rather than "Tweants"). Alternatively, speakers combine the names: a speaker from Rijssen could say they speak "Riessens Tweants".

In less precise circumstances, its speakers mostly call Tweants plat, which may either be an abbreviated form of Plattdeutsch, or a loanword from Dutch that means 'vernacular'. A widespread misconception is the assumption that it is a variety of Dutch. It is a variety of Dutch Low Saxon, recognised by the Dutch government as a regional language according to the European Charter for Regional or Minority Languages. As such, institutions dedicated to Tweants receive minor funding for its promotion and preservation.

Its revaluation as a dialect of Low Saxon rather than Standard Dutch is a relatively recent development. Due to ongoing stigmatisation, the use of the language declined in the decades following the Second World War. It was considered an inappropriate way of speaking, and thought to hinder children's language learning abilities and diminish their future prospects. Due to a general rise in regional pride, interests in preserving and promoting the language have risen, resulting in dialect writing competitions, teaching materials, festivals, and other culturally engaging projects.

== Classification ==
As a dialect of Low Saxon, Tweants belongs to the Indo-European language family, belonging to the West-Germanic group of Germanic languages. It is a direct descendant from Old Saxon, and as such, it is closely related to English and Frisian. Old Saxon gradually developed into Middle Low Saxon throughout the Middle Ages, and rose to prominence as an international language of trade. Due to close trading ties with the adjacent Münsterland during those days, Tweants adopted many Westphalian traits. When the Tweante region became a fixed part of the Netherlands, and the economic fulcrum of the country shifted towards the western provinces, Standard Dutch gained influence over the language within the Dutch borders, and as a result Middle Low Saxon grew more and more apart into the various modern Low Saxon dialects.

== Phonology ==
Martin speaking Tweants

Tweants does not have a standardised pronunciation, but all varieties shared a number of characteristics.

The following paragraphs contain IPA symbols.

=== Vowels ===
Monophthong phonemes
	Front				Central		Back	
	unrounded		rounded		unrounded		rounded	
	short	long	short	long	short	long	short	long
Close	i	iː	y	yː			u	uː
Close-mid	ɪ	eː	ʏ	øː	ə			oː
Open-mid	ɛ	ɛː	œ	œː	ə		ɔ	ɔː
Open					a	aː		

Diphthong phonemes
Starting point	Ending point	
Starting point	Front	Back
Close	ɪi	
Mid	ɛi	ɔu

Example words for vowels
Short				Long			
Phoneme	IPA	Orthography	Meaning	Phoneme	IPA	Orthography	Meaning
/i/	/i/	ie	'you'	/iː/	/ˈriːʝə/	riege	'row'
/y/				/yː/	/byːl/	buul	'bag'
/u/	/hus/	hoes	'house'	/uː/	/uːl/	oel	'owl'
/ɪ/	/vɪs/	viske	'fish'	/eː/	/keːnt/	keend	'child'
/ʏ/	/ˈbrʏməl/	brummel	'blackberries'	/øː/	/løː/	leu	'people'
				/oː/	/bloːm/	bloom	'flower'
/ɛ/	/bɛk/	bek	'beak'	/ɛː/	/kɛːrk/	keark	'church'
/œ/	/lœs/	lös	'loose'	/œː/	/ˈhœːrə/	höare	'hairs'
/ə/	/ˈbrʏməl/	brummel	'blackberries'				
/ɔ/	/bɔs/	bos	'forest' –	/ɔː/	/rɔːt/	road	'red'
/a/	/tak/	tak	'branch'	/aː/	/aːp/	aap	'monkey'
/ɪi/	/nɪi/	nij	'new'				
/ɛi/	/vlɛis/	vleis	'meat'				
/ɔu/	/slɔu/	slouw					

This survey of vowels includes only the most general vowels present in (nearly) all varieties, and does by no means give an all-encompassing overview of all varieties, as pronunciation differs per village and town, and may differ even within a town. A striking example of this may be found in the town of Rijssen, where two pronunciation forms of the past tense verb form of go are commonly accepted: gung /ɣʏŋ/ and gong /ɣɔŋ/. As there is no standard variety of Tweants, and there is little or no education in the language, speakers may select their pronunciation based on personal preferences, social circumstance, or peer pressure.

==== Westphalian vowel break ====
Considered a remnant of Westphalian, some Tweants varieties add a diphthong to a number of vowels that are monophthongs in others. The /eː/, /oː/, and /øː/ are pronounced [ɪə], [ɔə], and [ʏə]. This is called the Westphalian vowel break (westfälische Brechung or Westfälische Brechung, lit. Westphalian breaking), and is most noticeable in the dialects of Rijssen, Enter, and Vriezenveen. On some instances in the former two, the break has been lost and the onset vowel has developed into a monophthong. In Enter, for instance the word 'beaven' (to shiver) has developed into 'bieven' (/biːwn̩/, and in Rijssen, the words 'spoor' (track) and 'vöär' (before) have developed into /spuːr/ and /vyːr/.

==== Consonants ====
[p]* – as in the Dutch word pot, e.g. pot. [pɒt]
[t]* – as in the Dutch word tak, e.g. tand [tãːt] (tooth)
[k]* – as in the Dutch word ketel, e.g. kettel [ˈkɛtəl] (kettle)
[ɣ] – as in the Dutch word gaan, e.g. goan [ɣɒːn] (go)
[ʝ] – as in the Dutch word ja but with more friction, Southern Dutch g, e.g. rieg [riːʝ] (impale)
[j] – as in the English word yes, e.g. rieg [riːj] (impale) (local pronunciations may vary).
[ŋ] – as in the English word ring, e.g. hangen [haŋː] (hang).
[ɴ] – as above but more back. Occurs only before and after [χ]; in the latter case as syllabic [ɴ̩].
[χ] – as in the Dutch word lachen, e.g. lachn [ˈlaχɴ̩] (laugh).
[r] – as an alveolar, tapped r, e.g. road [rɔːt] (council).
[j] – as in the English word yes, e.g. striedn [ˈstriːjn] (fight, battle)
[w] – as in the English word well, in intervocalic position, e.g. oaver [ˈɔːwə] (about, over)
[ʋ] – as in the Dutch word "wat", in word- or syllable-initial position, e.g. "wear" [ʋɛə] (weather).
[m] – as in the English word man, e.g. moat [mɔːt] (mate).

* Slightly aspirated in some varieties.

==== Varieties of r ====
Tweants is to a great extent non-rhotic. Speakers do not pronounce final /r/ in words consisting of more than one syllable, if no clarity or emphasis is required. In monosyllabic words, the /r/ is not pronounced before dental consonants. Similarly to German and Danish, /r/ in syllable coda is vocalized to [ə], [ɒ] or [ɐ].

Tweants, like non-rhotic British English, has a linking -r and an intrusive -r. This is a considered a sign of proficiency, and desirable.

===== Syllabic consonants =====
Like many other Germanic languages, Tweants uses syllabic consonants in infinite verb forms and plural nouns (the "swallowing" of final -en syllables). This may be compared to British RP pronunciation of mutton, which is pronounced somewhat like mut-n. Tweants applies this to all verbs:

  - The infinite verb etten (to eat) is pronounced [ˈɛtn̩].

==== Lenition ====
Tweants applies extensive lenition in its spoken form. All strong plosives may be pronounced as their weak counterparts in intervocalic position (e.g. "better" can be pronounced either as [ˈbɛtə] or [ˈbɛdə]).

== Grammar ==
In general, all varieties of Tweants follow a Subject-Verb-Object word order in main clauses, and Subject-Object-Verb in subordinate clauses. For instance, in the two following sentences:

- |S- Jan | V- skrivt | O- een book.| (John writes a book.)
- || Main Clause: |S-Hee | V-sea || Sub Clause: dat | S- Jan | O- een book | V- skrivt || (He said that John writes a book.)

=== Verbs ===
Tweants follows a number of general Low Saxon rules in verb inflection, including the singular pluralis; plural verb forms receive the same inflection as the second person singular. In present tense, an -(e)t is attached to the verb stem, whereas in past tense, an -(e)n is attached.

Tweants, like many other Germanic languages, distinguishes between strong and weak verbs. Strong verbs receive an umlaut in present tense third person singular and all persons in past tense. In weak verbs, the third person singular is formed like the second person singular in present tense, and in past tense is formed by adding a -ten or -den to the verb stem.

=== Present tense ===
Tweants	English
Ik lope	I walk
Y loopt	You walk
Hee / see löpt	He / she walks
Wy loopt	We walk
Ylüde loopt	You walk (plural)
Seelüde loopt	They walk

=== Past tense ===
Tweants	English
Ik löype	I walked
Y löypeden	You walked
Hee / See löyp	He / She walked
Wylüde löypeden	We walked
Ylüde löypeden	You walked (plural)
See löypeden	They walked

=== Plurals ===
Plural nouns are formed according to their gender. Tweants has three-word genders, namely masculine, feminine and neuter

==== Masculine ====
Plurals for masculine are generally formed by adding umlaut and word-final -e to the noun

Tweants	English
eynen hund	one dog
twey hünde	Two dogs

==== Feminine ====
Plurals for feminine nouns are generally formed by adding word-final -n to the noun

Tweants	English
eyne kumme	one bowl
twey kummen	Two bowls

==== Neuter ====
Plurals for neuter nouns are generally formed by adding word-final -er to the noun.

Tweants	English
eyn kind	one child
twey kinder	Two children

If the neuter noun has a back vowel, it also receives an umlaut and -er.

Tweants	English
eyn book	one book
twey böker	Two books

=== Diminutives and plurals ===
Tweants	English
een kümmeke	one little bowl
twee kümmekes	two little bowls

== Sociolinguistic characteristics ==
Tweants has long been looked down upon, and is generally considered a low-prestige language, often equalled with farm-specific jargon. Speakers report the language to "immediately bring about a more inclusive and informal atmosphere".

Speakers may switch to (their attempt at) Standard Dutch when circumstances indicate a more "socially upward circle". Depending on the perceived distinction those circumstances, speakers may opt to include regionalisms in their Dutch, whether that implies an accent, morphology, underlying grammatical structures or idioms.

Though Tweants is considered a language without class distinctions, speakers tend to look for older words and phrases in language preservation gatherings. Knowledge of the aforementioned farm-specific jargon is often considered a sign (and a test) of proficiency.

== Interference in Dutch ==
Native speakers have a distinct accent when speaking Dutch. While the accent is a result of Low Saxon phonetic properties and can vary per person or social circumstance, particularly the distinct pronunciation of the 'O' and 'E' is renowned. It is similar to the Hiberno-English or Scots pronunciation of the 'O' and the 'A'. Another striking feature of Tweants Dutch (and therefore a sign of L1-interference) is the use of a syllabic consonant, which in popular Dutch language is often referred to as "swallowing final -en".

On an idiomatic level, people from Twente may sometimes translate phrases literally into Dutch, thus forming Twentisms. Due to the fact that Tweants and Standard Dutch are varieties of the West Germanic languages, they have many similarities, which may lead speakers of Tweants to believe that a "Dutchified" pronunciation of a Tweants expression is correct and valid:

In English: I have a flat tyre
In Tweants: Ik hebbe den band lek
In Tweants-influenced Dutch (Twentism): *Ik heb de band lek (lit. I have the tyre flat)
In Standard Dutch: Ik heb een lekke band (lit. I have a leak tyre)

On an idiomatic level, Tweants is known for its wealth of proverbs, of which the following are only a fraction:

- Låt mär külen, et löpt wal lös – Literally: Let it roll/fall, it will walk free – Never mind, it will sort itself out.
- As de tyd kumt, kumt de plåg – When the time comes, the trouble comes. Don't worry before the trouble starts.
- Y köänet nich blåsen en den meal in den mund holden – Literally, you cannot blow and keep the flour in your mouth at the same time. 'Blåsen' also means 'to brag', so its real meaning is the same as "put your money where your mouth is"
- Hengeler weend – Wind from Hengelo, a haughty attitude.

Speakers of Tweants generally tend to be a little more indirect than speakers of Dutch. For instance, when speakers of Tweants say: "t Is hier redelik doo" (It's reasonably thaw in here), they usually mean that they find the temperature unpleasantly high in the room.

== Tweants in present-day Twente ==
Generally speaking, the use of Tweants is strictly reserved to informal situations. It is widespread in family life, as well as in local sports associations and cultural or leisurely activities. In many traditional professions such as construction, road engineering, agriculture, and transport is still a wide-spread mode of communication.

Tweants is neither used structurally nor taught mandatorily in schools. This may be ascribed to the traditional belief that Tweants is supposedly an improper speech variety, the use of which bespeaks little intelligence or sophistication. However, as the status of Tweants is gradually improving, school boards may now opt for a lesson series Tweants Kwarteerken (loosely translated as 15 minutes of Tweants) designed for implication in nursery and primary schools. The fairly recently instated Twente Hoes is working on further teaching materials, which school boards may adopt free of charge.

Up until recently, Tweants was, and still is, also believed to impede proper acquisition of Standard Dutch, which dominates all parts of Dutch public life. Parents generally acquiesce in this attitude and tried to teach their children to speak Dutch. Those parents, however, were used to speaking Tweants, which influenced especially their pronunciation of Dutch, and to a lesser extent their syntax and choice of vocabulary.

Dutch is still the prevailing and most prestigious language in Twente, though there has lately been a resurgence of interest in the local language.

Because Twente is an attractive place for investment, many companies establish themselves in Twente and attract people from other parts of the country who do not speak Tweants. This aggravates the decline of the Tweants language. In the countryside, however, many people still speak it or at least understand it.

Recently, Tweants has enjoyed a resurgence because of an increasing tolerance for and pride in local culture, including local language. The resurgence is backed by the opinion of linguists, who believe that children who are brought up bilingually are more receptive to other languages. The increasing interest in Tweants is expressed by writers, musicians and local media, and people have been inspired to start speaking and teaching Tweants again. This renewed interest, mirrored by other local languages in the Netherlands and elsewhere in Europe, is referred to as the dialect renaissance. An important stimulant for trend was the start of the 2000s soap in Tweants, "Van Jonge Leu en Oale Groond" ("Of young people and old land"). The soap, focussing on a rural part of Twente, combined local traditions and culture with the life and aspirations of young people, emphasising how people can live modern lives while cherishing and being rooted in local traditions. Originally broadcast by local television, it was later broadcast on national television with subtitles.

From the 2000s onwards, Tweants is increasingly being employed in advertising. More and more companies choose for a Tweants slogan, and some choose for a more personal advertising approach, by translating their adverts into several dialects. Examples of such companies are Regiobank and Moneybird. Furthermore, the municipality of Rijssen-Holten employs a number of civil servants, who are allowed to wed couples in Tweants. Additionally, the municipality hall's personnel is officially bilingual, being able to help citizens in either Dutch, Tweants or Sallaands.

In 2012, a radio presenter for national broadcasting station 3FM, Michiel Veenstra from Almelo, promised to present in Twents for an hour if a Twents song received more than €10,000 in the annual fundraising campaign Het Glazen Huis (The Glass House). As the song received more than €17,000, Veenstra kept his promise.

In 2014, a Facebook page called "Tukkers be like" gained more than 18,000 followers within a week. The page uses Twents cultural concepts, and expressions in the Twents language. The idea of the page was based on the US Internet meme "Bitches be like", which gained enormous popularity in 2013, and inspired many to create their own versions. The meme presents an image of a certain situation, to which a certain group would respond in a typical way.

Other current youth culture initiatives incorporate the language in their media outings, such as the Facebook page Tweants dialect, the online magazine Wearldsproake, and a string of other entertainment outlets.

== Written forms ==
In general, Tweants isn't commonly written for every-day exchanges. It is mostly reserved to tokenism writings, like festive signs or slogans. As Tweants is not widely taught in schools and most speakers only have formal training in Dutch spelling, most people who try it take a highly phonetic approach. Most adhere to the commonly repeated rule of "write it as you say it," which in reality means they write it somewhat like Dutch.

Stylised, literary writing is limited, although there are some individual language enthusiasts, divided into two more or less accepted spelling camps: the Kreenk vuur de Twentse Sproake (KTS)-spelling, and the Standaard Schriefwieze (SS). The former seeks to adhere to Standard Dutch as much as possible, while the latter is aimed at displaying local pronunciation, based on Dutch orthography. Few writers, however, strictly follow these spelling rules, or are even aware of them.

There is no generally accepted Tweants spelling, although discussions about it are held regularly. The (more educated) debate always evolves around two points of view, best reflected in the aforementioned KTS and SS spellings.

- The spelling should be easily accessible and recognisable for speakers of other varieties of Low Saxon as well as speakers of Dutch. This results in a spelling based on writing traditions from Dutch and different speech varieties. An advantage of this is that this does provide an accessible layout. At the same time, it sounds odd or unnatural when pronounced literally, and therefore might work distractingly.
- The spelling should closely reflect the pronunciation of the people using it. This means a spelling that is not easily legible, if not confusing to speakers and readers of other varieties. It results in many written consonant clusters.

A word like zeggen ("to say") can be found written as both zeggen and zegn in either of the two spelling systems, but informally as zeg'n, zeng or even zeng(')n as well.

== Cultural expressions in Tweants ==
The earliest form of written Tweants is a poem dating from the eighteenth century, although it is a rare example. Tweants, like the other Dutch Low Saxon dialects, has had a literary tradition since the nineteenth century when Romanticism sparked an interest in regional culture. Some of the better-known authors include:

- Johanna van Buren (poet, wrote in a Sallaans-Tweants border dialect)
- Theo Vossebeld (poet)
- G.B. Vloedbeld (writer)
- Johan Gigengack (writer)
- Willem Wilmink (poet, songwriter)
- Herman Finkers (comedian)
- Anne van der Meijden (minister)

Since the start of the dialect renaissance, Tweants has increasingly been used as a written language. This is, however, almost entirely reserved to the province of literature. Works have been translated into Tweants to stress that Tweants is as sophisticated and expressive as any other language, and to put its own aesthetic properties to use. It is, however, strikingly absent in public institutions.

Tweants is often seen as an easy vehicle for carrying jokes, and there are relatively many local revues who use Tweants for comic effect, effectively enhancing the idea that it isn't a serious language.

Some comic books and a children's television programme have been translated into Tweants to critical success.

Dutch comedian Herman Finkers, increasingly seen as the figurehead of the Tweants language, translated his last shows into Tweants. He used the motto "accentless at last", to indicate that he can finally sound natural by using his mother tongue, without someone mocking him about it. Finkers also wrote the scenario for the movie The Marriage Escape, which was the first movie ever to be predominantly spoken in Tweants and became the third best-visited film in the Netherlands in 2020.

A long-standing promotor of the use of Tweants, the late reverend Anne van der Meijden, translated the Bible into Tweants using the original languages as a reference. He also preached sermons in Tweants.

The Twentehoes (Twente House) was an organisation that mapped, monitored, promoted and developed teaching materials for Tweants, Tweants identity and the culture of Twente. Due to a lack of funds and an aging pool of volunteers, the endeavour soon lost its initial appeal, was first relocated to Borne and then the Rijssens Museum in the town of Rijssen, and is struggling to stay open.

With the rise of social media platforms such as YouTube and TikTok, there is some renewed interest in the language, as some accounts use it for educational purposes.
