= Wermers =

Wermers is a surname. It is a patronymic of Wermer. Notable people with the surname include:

- Nicole Wermers (born 1971), German artist
- Stevie Wermers (born 1966), American story artist and director

== See also ==
- Heike Wermer (born 1988), German politician
- John Wermer, American mathematician
- Wemmers
