= Villa de Bank =

Coordinates: 52°13′02″N 6°54′32″E

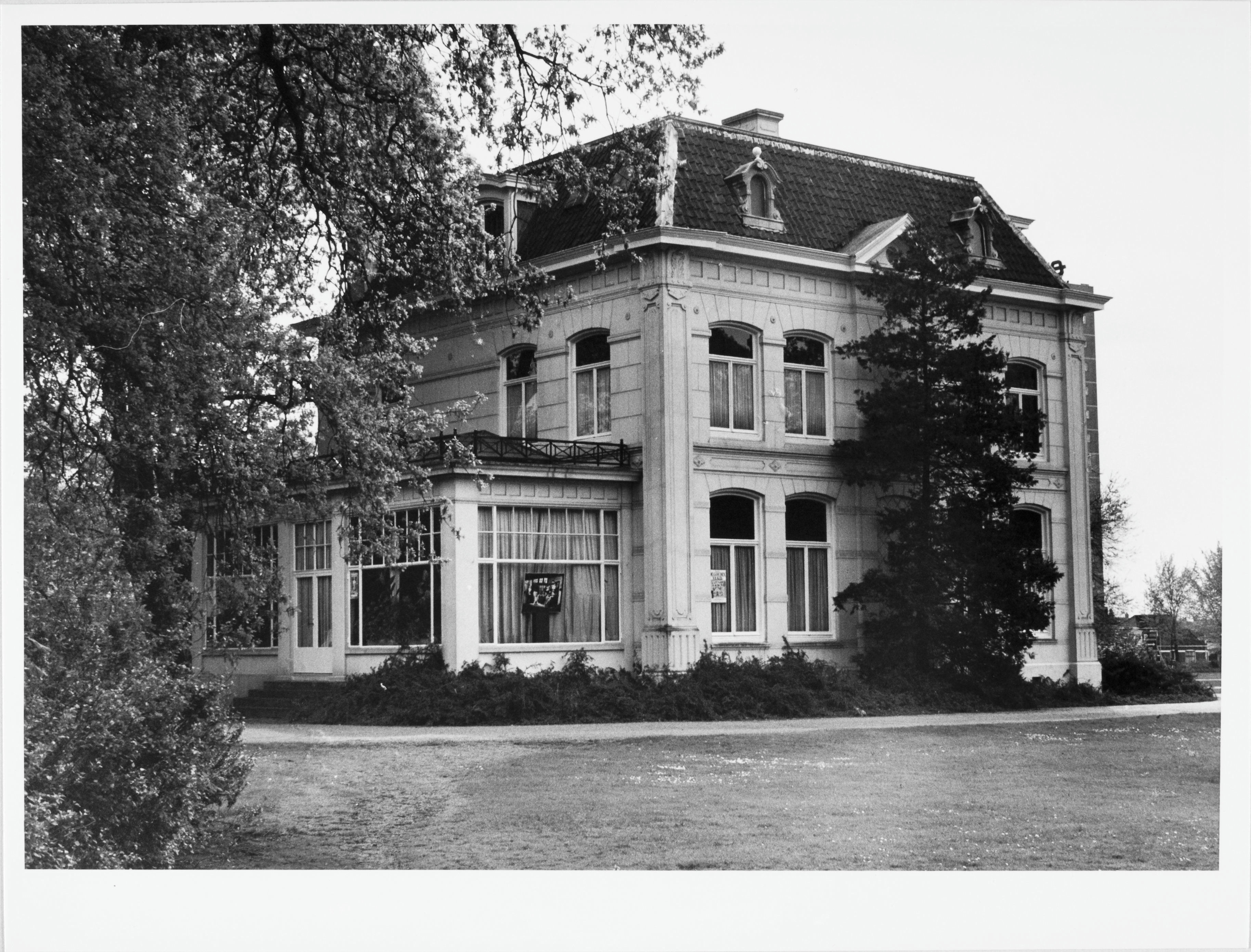
Villa Blijdenstein, back view

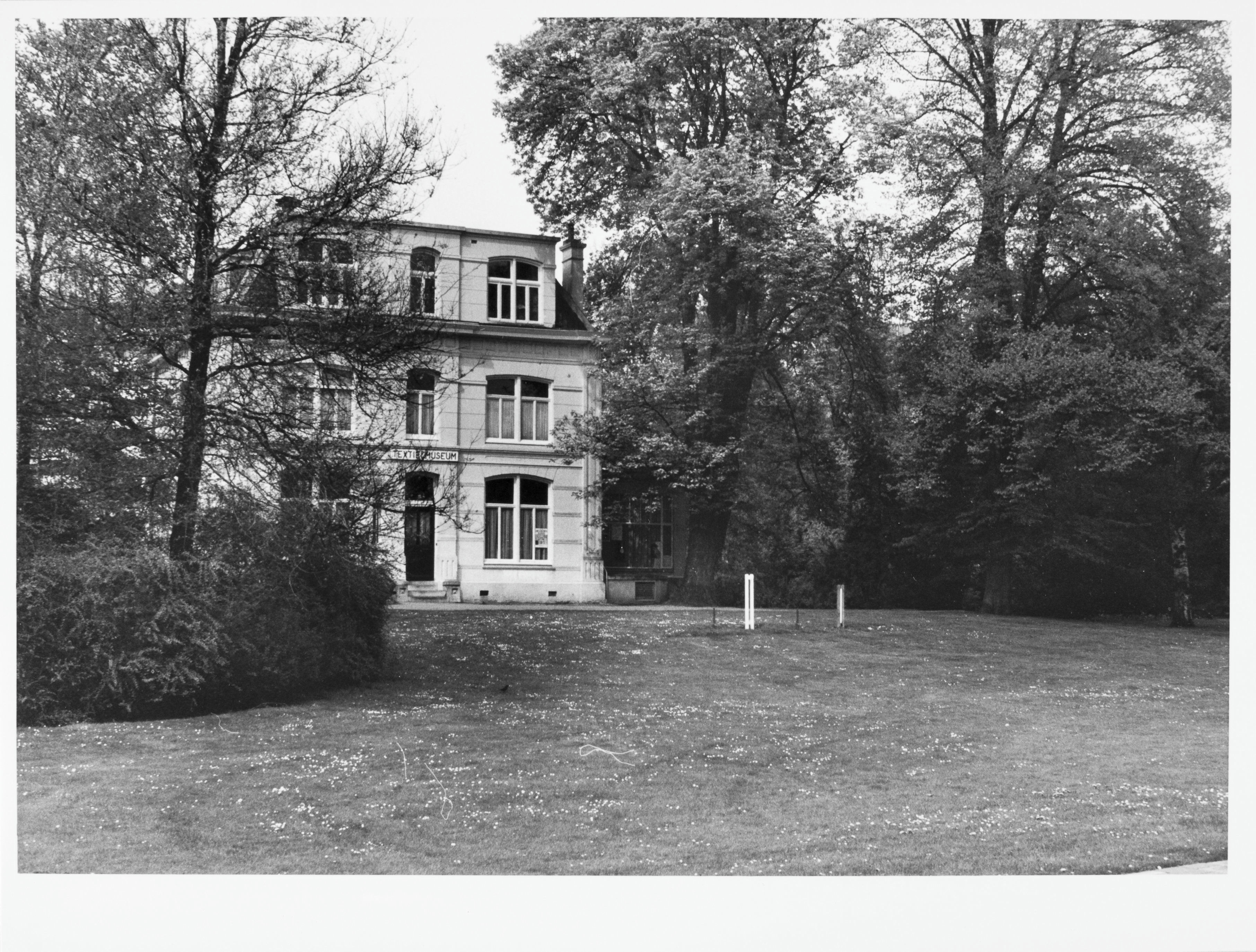
Villa Blijdenstein, front view

Villa De Bank is an art space in the Dutch city Enschede. It has been located in the former villa Blijdenstein since its foundation in 1998. The art space was created through a fusion of the foundations Stichting de Villa and Stichting de Bank, both founded in the 1980s.

== Location ==
The artist-run initiative is situated in a stately villa, in a small park east of the city centre. Surrounding the villa is the Blijdensteinpark with several statues, including a colonial monument by Hans Petri. The two sections of the Blijdensteinpark previously formed an estate of five and a half hectares around the country house.

== Exhibitions ==
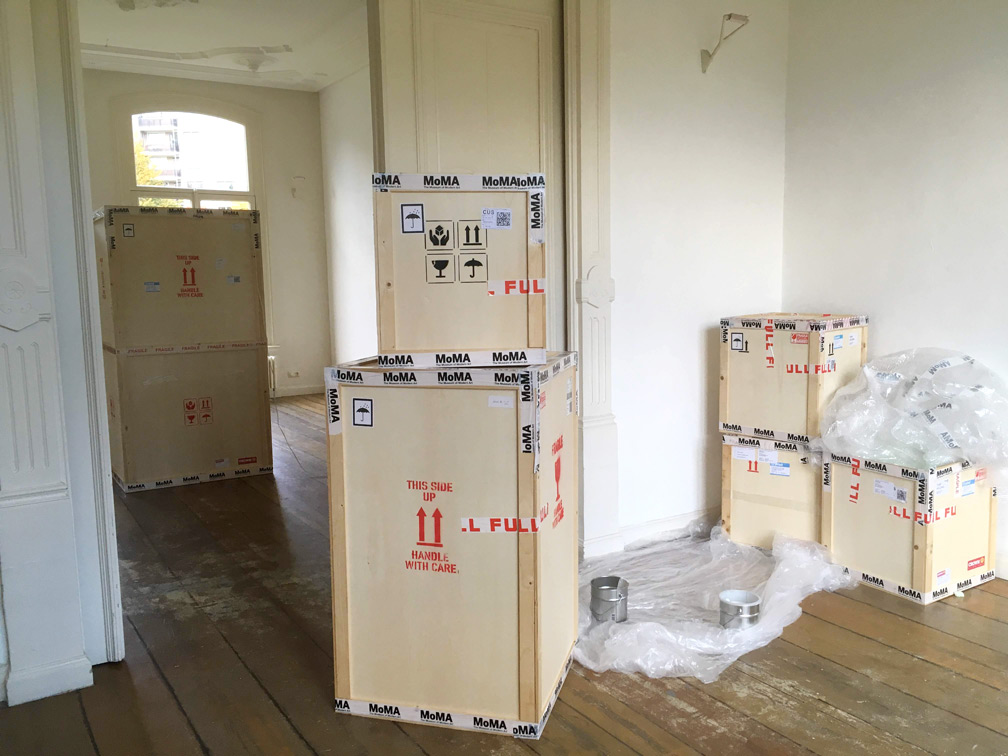
An exhibition in Villa de Bank

The exhibition policy mostly aims to show solo presentations of young artists, including graduates of the AKI academy of fine arts. Besides solo shows there are occasional themed exhibitions and international exchange projects, often in cooperation with Kunstverein ArtHAUS located in Ahaus, Germany. In 2018 Villa de Bank showed the work of Dutch artist Melle Nieling in a cooperation with the Museum of Modern Art in New York.

Villa de Bank organizes about seven shows lasting a month and a half, every year. Accompanying these exhibitions a list of editions, books and catalogues have been published. To finance the activities, the artist initiative has a circle of donators, who receive an annual print folder and multiples as compensation.

Various prominent Dutch and international artists have exhibited at the art space, including: Gijs Assmann, Hans Ebeling Koning and Philip Akkerman.

== History ==
=== Art space De Bank ===
Art space De Bank (Dutch: Kunstruimte De Bank) was founded in 1985 by four artists. The founders were Jos Boomkamp, Albert Bouhuis, Eric de Gram and Paul Silder. Before foundation of the art space the latter two worked together under the name Bank of Friendship, named after the homonymous pub on Blackstock Road in London. At this time Art space De Bank was located in a former store on the Noorderhagen in Enschede, and organized small exhibitions with both young and established artists. Of the four founders Paul Silder is the only one still involved in daily affairs.

=== Villa Blijdenstein ===
In 1806 Jan Bernard Blijdenstein (1756–1826) ordered the construction of a villa besides the Espoort. King Louis Napoléon Bonaparte stayed in the villa during his visit to Enschede on the seventh of March, 1809.

The current neoclassicist villa with the symmetrical white plaster facade was built in 1881. It was ordered by Herman Gijsbert Blijdenstein and his wife Emmerentia Johanna Ebeling and designed by the architect H.P. Timmer. Their daughter Johanna Ide Beltman-Blijdenstein was the last to inhabit the villa. In 1958 the estate was donated to the county of Enschede for the construction of a motorway, the Boulevard 1945. It was decided that the original county house would get a public function in the domain of science and the arts.

Since 1962 the villa functioned as a museum for the local textile industry. When the museum moved to a former textile factory, the villa was rented to Stichting de Villa, a foundation that offered studio spaces for visual artists. The ground floor was turned into an exhibition space.

Local entrepreneurs have developed plans to transform the villa into a private club with a public bar and a new art space besides it. Around 2010 the county of Enschede started looking for an alternative location for the art space Villa de Bank. A court ruling decided Villa de Bank adhered to the rules of the initial bequest, by dividing the space into private studios and a public exhibition space.
