= Remler =

Remler is a surname. Notable people with the surname include:

- Elin Pudas Remler (born 2004), Swedish golfer
- Emily Remler (1957–1990), American jazz guitarist
- Philip Remler, American diplomat

== See also ==
- Remmer
- Semler
