= Remmers =

Remmers is a surname. Notable people with the surname include:

- Guy Remmers (born 1995), English actor and model
- Ingrid Remmers (1965–2021), German politician
- Jan Remmers (1922–2013), Dutch footballer and coach
- Mike Remmers (born 1989), American football player
- Walter Remmers (1933–2018), German politician (CDU)
- Werner Remmers (1930–2011), German politician (CDU)
- R. Wiley Remmers (1916–2003), former member of the Nebraska Legislature

== See also ==
- Remmer
- Remmert
