= Wemmers =

Wemmers is a surname. Notable people with the surname include:

- Carl Wemmers (1845–1882), German chess master
- Jacobus Wemmers (1598–1645), Carmelite friar

== See also ==
- Remmers
