= Hardick & Seckel Factory =

Textile factory in the Netherlands

Hardick & Seckel was a textile factory in the town of Enschede, the Netherlands believed to have been built in the late 19th century, which emerged from two textile factories, a silk factory and a horse product factory.

The fierce competition in the textile industry caused many factories to go bankrupt, close or move their businesses elsewhere. Hardick & Seckel was combined with a number of other factories which were bought by the municipality of Enschede. The property continued to be used by local companies for many years until it was allowed to stand largely empty. In 1984 a new lease through an initiative of a few municipal officials saw the renovation of the site for use as a "business centre". The building was renovated and adapted to the modern requirements, financially supported by the European Union.

The Hardick & Seckel complex consisted of three main buildings. The buildings were divided into several business units, offices and storage units. From 1985 to 1987 the company operated at a loss but the following 20 years it operated profitably. This continued until May 2006 with help from the Entrepreneurs Foundation Centers Enschede (SOCE).

In 1997 the Enschede municipality initiated a plan to close Hardick & Seckel. The entrepreneurs were not part of that plan and were to be removed from the area. After resistance by the incumbent operators in the building, by the council and the college, a final agreement reached in 1998 meant Hardick & Seckel remained there as a business centre. It was a long road to keep the business complex open, but the buildings proved popular. Eventually in 2001 the alterations and adjustments were completed.

Hardick & Seckel proved to still be in the attention of the municipality of Enschede. By the end of 2006, the complex, together with the surrounding plots (a total business area of 5 hectares) was brought into disrepute again. There was talk of a loss of €250,000 per year. For that reason, Hardick & Seckel closed. In 2003 the companies occupying the space were operating profitably, but after the introduction of the Rent System companies found it hard to continue. The area is to be demolished in the last quarter of 2009 for redevelopment.
