= Eintracht Ahaus =

German football club

- Full name: Sport-Verein Eintracht 1908 Ahaus e.V.
- Founded: 1908
- League: Landesliga Westfalen 4 (VII)
- 2015–16: 7th
Home colours	Away colours

Eintracht Ahaus is a German football club from the city of Ahaus, North Rhine-Westphalia.

== History ==
The team was established in 1908 as Ahauser Ballspielclub and quickly underwent a pair of name changes, first playing as Ahauser Spielvereinigung 08 and then later adopting the name Spiel-Verein Eintracht 08 Ahaus. In 1934, all sports clubs in Ahaus were merged into a single side called Turn- und Sportverein 1892 Ahaus. Eintract reappeared as a separate side after World War II.

The club played two seasons in the Amateurliga Westfalen/Gruppe Nord (II) in 1953–55 before slipping into lower-tier competition. They returned to the Amateurliga, which had become a third tier circuit, for a three-season turn beginning in 1968. Eintracht's best result there was a 7th-place finish.

The team currently plays in the tier seven Landesliga Westfalen 4.
