= Ahaus =

- Town
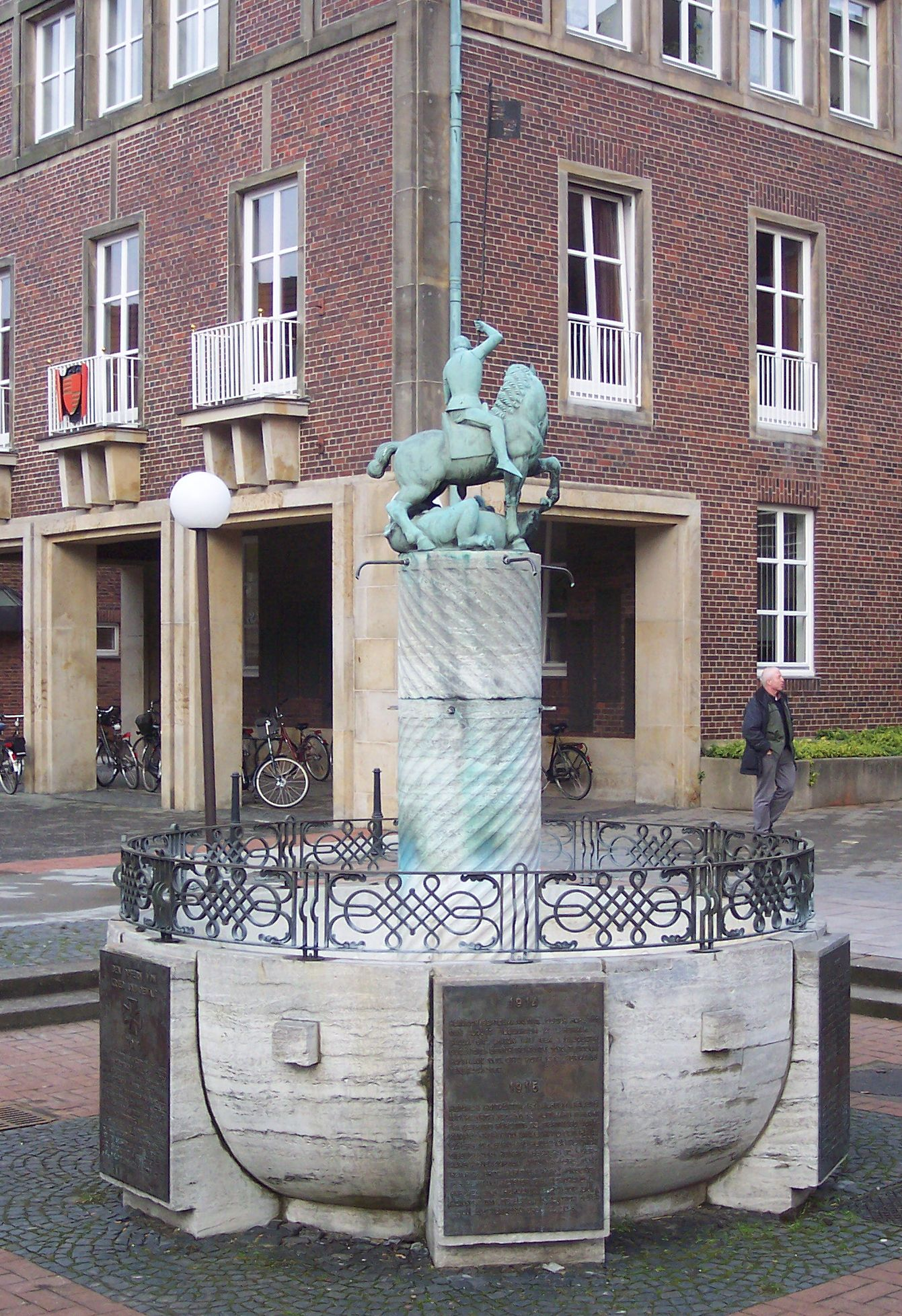
- St George's Fountain in Ahaus

- Coat of arms

- Location of Ahaus within Borken district
- Interactive map of Ahaus
- Location within Germany Location within North Rhine-Westphalia
- Coordinates: 52°4′N 7°0′E
- Country: Germany
- State: North Rhine-Westphalia
- Admin. region: Münster
- District: Borken
- Subdivisions: 6

Government
  - Mayor (2025–30): Karola Voß (Ind.)

Area
  - Total: 151.24 km^{2} (58.39 sq mi)
- Elevation: 36–70 m (118–230 ft)

Population (2025-12-31)
  - Total: 40,183
  - Density: 265.69/km^{2} (688.13/sq mi)
- Time zone: UTC+01:00 (CET)
  - Summer (DST): UTC+02:00 (CEST)
- Postal codes: 48683
- Dialling codes: 02561, 02567
- Vehicle registration: BOR, AH, BOH
- Website: www.ahaus.de

Ahaus (German pronunciation: [ˈaːhaʊs]; Westphalian: Ausen) is a town in the district of Borken in the state of North Rhine-Westphalia, Germany. It is located near the border with the Netherlands, lying some 20 km south-east of Enschede and 15 km south from Gronau. Ahaus is the location of one of Germany's interim storage facilities for radioactive spent fuel.

== History ==
The first written mention of the aristocratic seat of Haus an der Aa dates from around 1030. Around 1120, Bernhard von Diepenheim commissioned the construction of the predecessor to the present-day Ahaus Castle. In 1154, his son Lifhard called himself von Ahaus for the first time. The lords of Ahaus belonged to the smaller noble dynasties in Westphalia in the wider environment of the Munster bishops. They got into a fight with them in 1176 when the nobleman Johann von Ahaus gave his castle as a fief to the Archbishop of Cologne. In 1177, however, John had to surrender to Prince Bishop Hermann II of Münster. The castles of Ahaus and Diepenheim, which belonged to the noble lords of Ahaus, were destroyed. Nevertheless, the noble lords remained in possession of their rule.

In 1389 the noble lords of Ahaus granted the castle settlement an excise privilege. Two years later, Ahaus received city rights. In 1406, the Prince-Bishop of Münster, Otto IV von Hoya, bought the lordship of Ahaus and incorporated it into the Bishopric of Münster. It was combined by the Bishopric of Münster together with 24 parishes, which extended over large parts of West Münsterland, to form the Amt of Ahaus. It lasted until it was dissolved by the Reichsdeputationshauptschluss in 1803.

== Population ==
Historical population

Year	Pop.	±% p.a.
1965	24,112	—
1970	26,198	+1.67%
1975	27,116	+0.69%
1980	27,976	+0.63%
1985	29,259	+0.90%
1990	31,202	+1.29%
1995	34,708	+2.15%

Year	Pop.	±% p.a.
2000	37,279	+1.44%
2005	38,402	+0.60%
2010	38,952	+0.28%
2015	39,277	+0.17%
2020	39,404	+0.06%
2025	40,183	+0.39%

Source: Landesdatabank Nordrhein-Westfalen

== Politics ==
The current mayor is Karola Voß who has been serving as mayor since 2015. In the 2025 local elections she was reelected with 90% of the votes.

=== Council ===
After the 2025 elections, the Ahaus city council is composed as follows:

Party	Votes	%	+/-	Seats	+/-
Christian Democratic Union (CDU)	9,700	51.1	▲5.4	22	▲2
Independent Voters Association (UWG)	3,099	16.3	▼0.6	7	±0
Alliance 90/The Greens (Grüne)	1,665	8.8	▼3.9	4	▼1
Social Democratic Party (SPD)	1,625	8.6	▼3.6	4	▼1
Free Democratic Party (FDP)	793	4.2	▲0.3	2	±0
The Left (Die Linke)	670	3.5	▲2.9	1	▲1
Voters Association social Ahaus (WSA)	637	3.4	New	1	New
Voters Association Ahaus worth living (WLA)	534	2.8	▲0.6	1	±0
Independent Tobias Groten	178	0.9	New	0	New
Independent Christoph Bromisch	89	0.5	New	0	New
Valid votes	18,990	98.0			
Invalid votes	385	2.0			
Total	19,375	100.0		42	±0
Electorate/voter turnout	32,132	60.3			
Source: City of Ahaus

== Climate ==
Ahaus has an oceanic climate (Köppen: Cfb; Trewartha: Dobk).

Climate data for Ahaus, 1991–2020 normals, extremes 2006–present
Month	Jan	Feb	Mar	Apr	May	Jun	Jul	Aug	Sep	Oct	Nov	Dec	Year
Record high °C (°F)	16.1 (61.0)	19.3 (66.7)	24.5 (76.1)	28.5 (83.3)	32.3 (90.1)	35.9 (96.6)	39.5 (103.1)	36.6 (97.9)	32.2 (90.0)	28.0 (82.4)	19.8 (67.6)	16.5 (61.7)	39.5 (103.1)
Mean maximum °C (°F)	11.7 (53.1)	12.4 (54.3)	17.7 (63.9)	23.9 (75.0)	27.1 (80.8)	30.9 (87.6)	33.3 (91.9)	31.4 (88.5)	27.3 (81.1)	22.1 (71.8)	16.3 (61.3)	12.6 (54.7)	34.9 (94.8)
Mean daily maximum °C (°F)	5.4 (41.7)	6.5 (43.7)	10.0 (50.0)	15.4 (59.7)	18.8 (65.8)	21.9 (71.4)	24.0 (75.2)	23.0 (73.4)	19.5 (67.1)	14.7 (58.5)	9.6 (49.3)	6.3 (43.3)	14.6 (58.3)
Daily mean °C (°F)	3.1 (37.6)	3.5 (38.3)	5.8 (42.4)	10.1 (50.2)	13.7 (56.7)	16.8 (62.2)	18.6 (65.5)	17.7 (63.9)	14.5 (58.1)	10.9 (51.6)	6.9 (44.4)	4.2 (39.6)	10.5 (50.9)
Mean daily minimum °C (°F)	0.6 (33.1)	0.5 (32.9)	1.7 (35.1)	4.3 (39.7)	8.0 (46.4)	11.2 (52.2)	12.8 (55.0)	12.3 (54.1)	9.5 (49.1)	7.1 (44.8)	3.9 (39.0)	1.7 (35.1)	6.1 (43.0)
Mean minimum °C (°F)	−7.3 (18.9)	−5.5 (22.1)	−4.3 (24.3)	−2.2 (28.0)	1.1 (34.0)	5.8 (42.4)	6.9 (44.4)	7.0 (44.6)	3.8 (38.8)	0.6 (33.1)	−2.9 (26.8)	−5.3 (22.5)	−9.4 (15.1)
Record low °C (°F)	−17.1 (1.2)	−16.0 (3.2)	−9.1 (15.6)	−5.7 (21.7)	−1.0 (30.2)	3.4 (38.1)	4.9 (40.8)	5.0 (41.0)	0.7 (33.3)	−4.0 (24.8)	−7.2 (19.0)	−14.3 (6.3)	−17.1 (1.2)
Average precipitation mm (inches)	76.2 (3.00)	56.7 (2.23)	57.6 (2.27)	29.7 (1.17)	49.6 (1.95)	64.1 (2.52)	75.8 (2.98)	97.5 (3.84)	58.9 (2.32)	65.1 (2.56)	65.5 (2.58)	78.1 (3.07)	774.9 (30.51)
Average extreme snow depth cm (inches)	3.5 (1.4)	1.2 (0.5)	0.1 (0.0)	0 (0)	0 (0)	0 (0)	0 (0)	0 (0)	0 (0)	0 (0)	0.3 (0.1)	2.9 (1.1)	4.7 (1.9)
Average precipitation days (≥ 0.1 mm)	19.8	15.9	15.9	11.9	13.4	13.7	15.8	17.4	13.3	15.7	18.1	20.7	191.8
Average relative humidity (%)	87.8	83.8	78.0	70.7	70.0	72.6	73.3	77.1	81.4	85.3	88.3	89.1	79.8
Mean monthly sunshine hours	43.8	70.4	128.6	191.0	207.1	202.9	218.2	188.5	147.8	100.7	56.4	40.8	1,596.3
Source: Deutscher Wetterdienst/SKlima.de

== Twin towns – sister cities ==
Ahaus is twinned with:

- Argentré-du-Plessis, France
- Haaksbergen, Netherlands

== Notable people ==
- Friedrich Koechling (1893–1970), officer, general of infantry
- Michael Denhoff (born 1955), composer and cellist
- Jens Spahn (born 1980), politician (CDU), Member of Bundestag
- Heike Wermer (born 1988), CDU politician
- Urszula Radwańska (born 1990), Polish tennis player
- Stefan Thesker (born 1991), footballer
- Fabian Herbers (born 1993), professional MLS player who currently plays with CF Montreal

== Transport links ==
Ahaus is located in the Dortmund–Gronau railway and in the area of the fare association Westfalen-Tarif.

== See also ==
- Gesellschaft für Nuklear-Service
- Eintracht Ahaus
