= Remmert =

Remmert is a surname and given name. Notable people with the surname include:

- Birgit Remmert (born 1966), German mezzo-soprano
- Dennis Remmert (1938–2020), American football player
- Martha Remmert (1853–1941), German classical pianist, music educator, conductor and music writer
- Peter Remmert (born 2005), German footballer
- Reinhold Remmert (1930–2016), German mathematician
- Remmert Wielinga (born 1978), Dutch road bicycle racer

== See also ==
- Emmert
