= Enschede =

City and municipality in Overijssel, the Netherlands

Enschede Eanske (Twents)
- City and Municipality
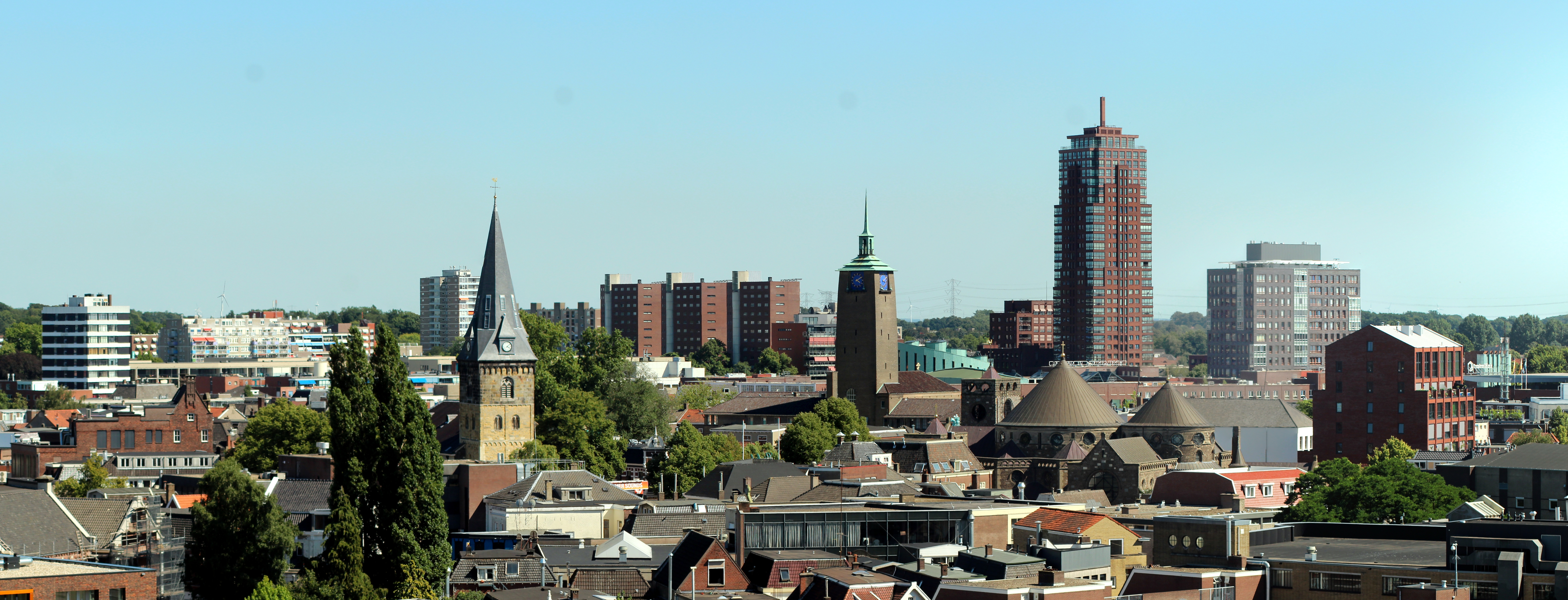
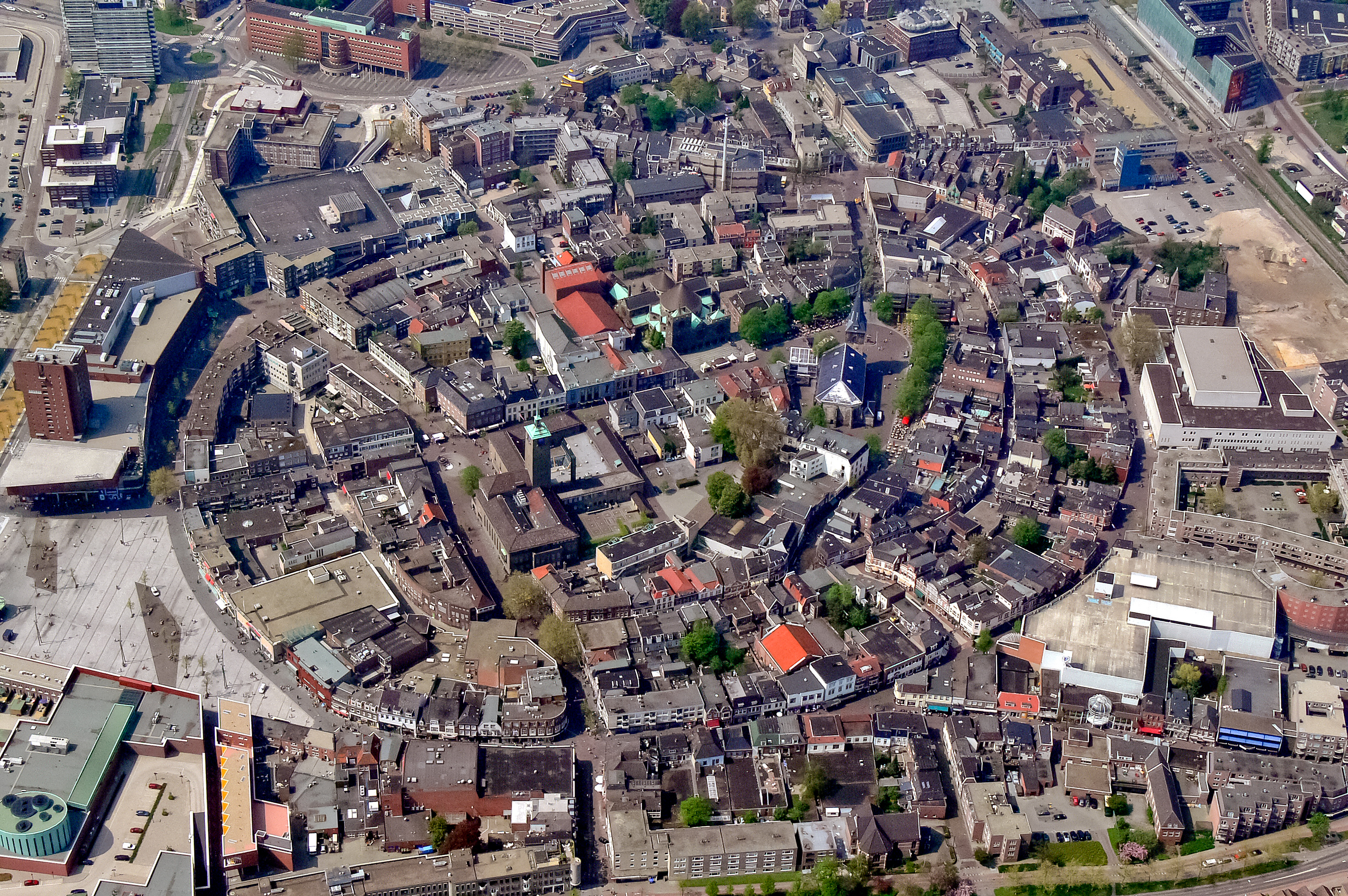
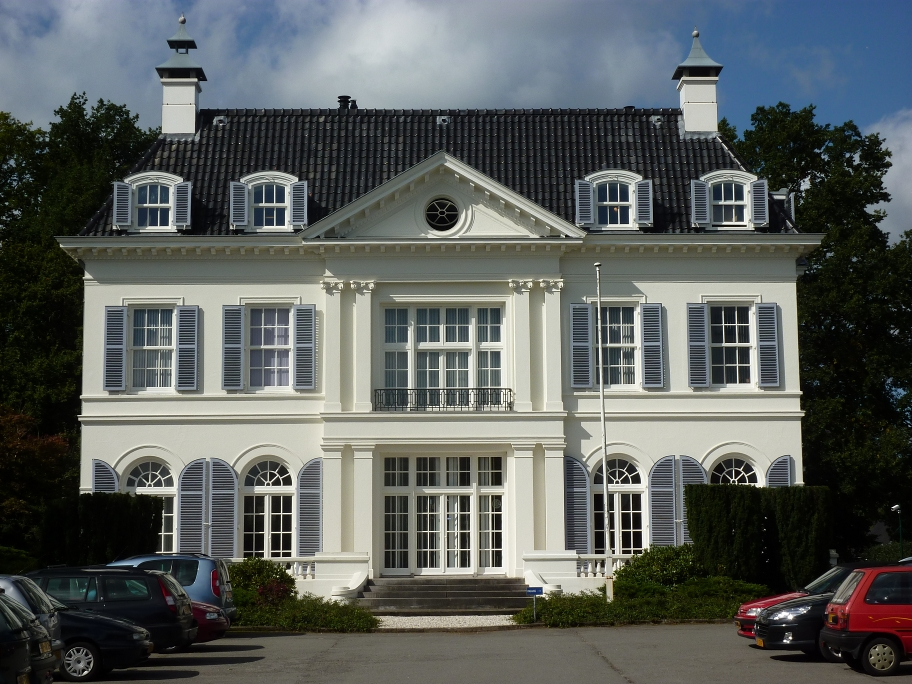
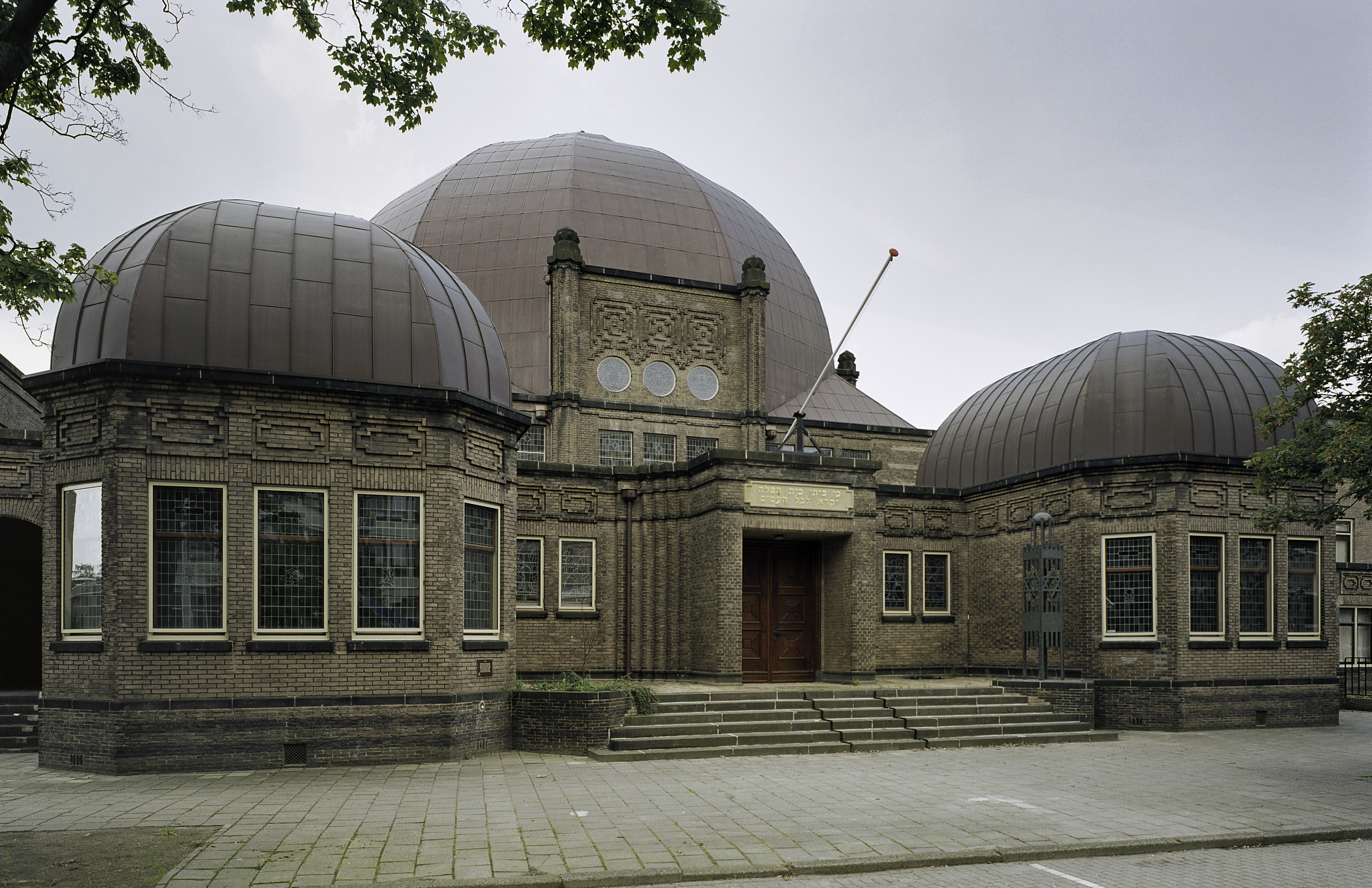
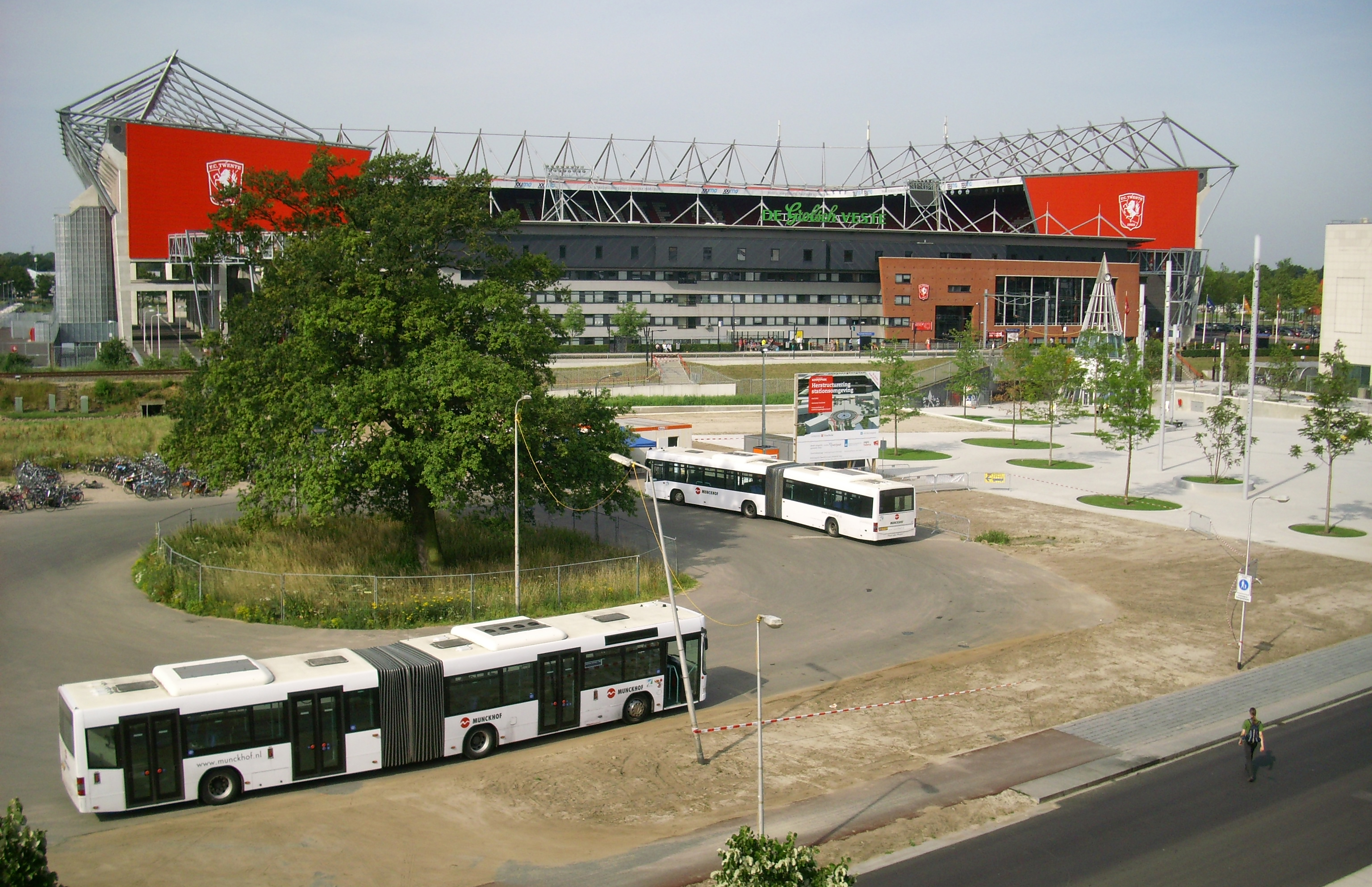
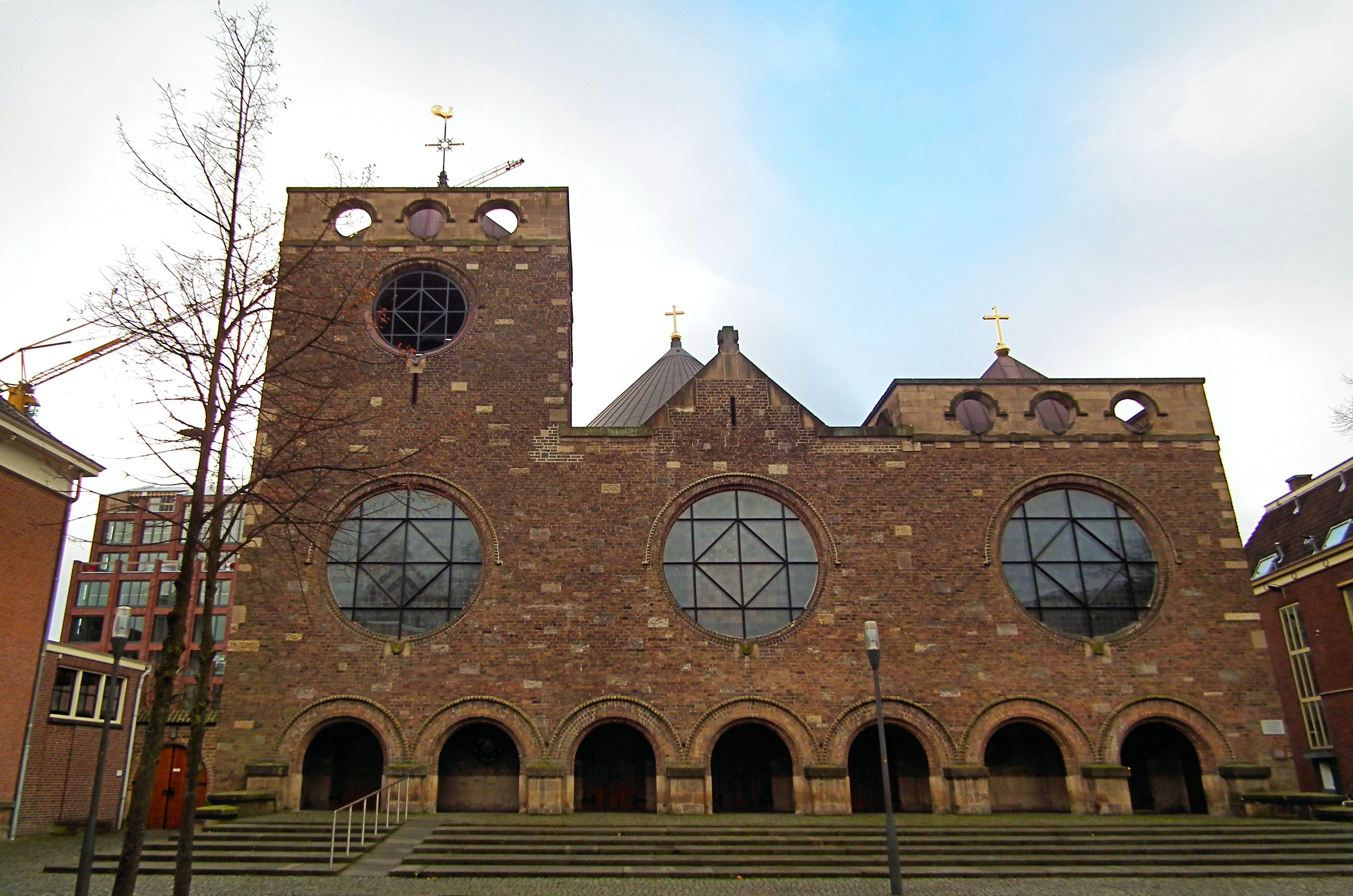
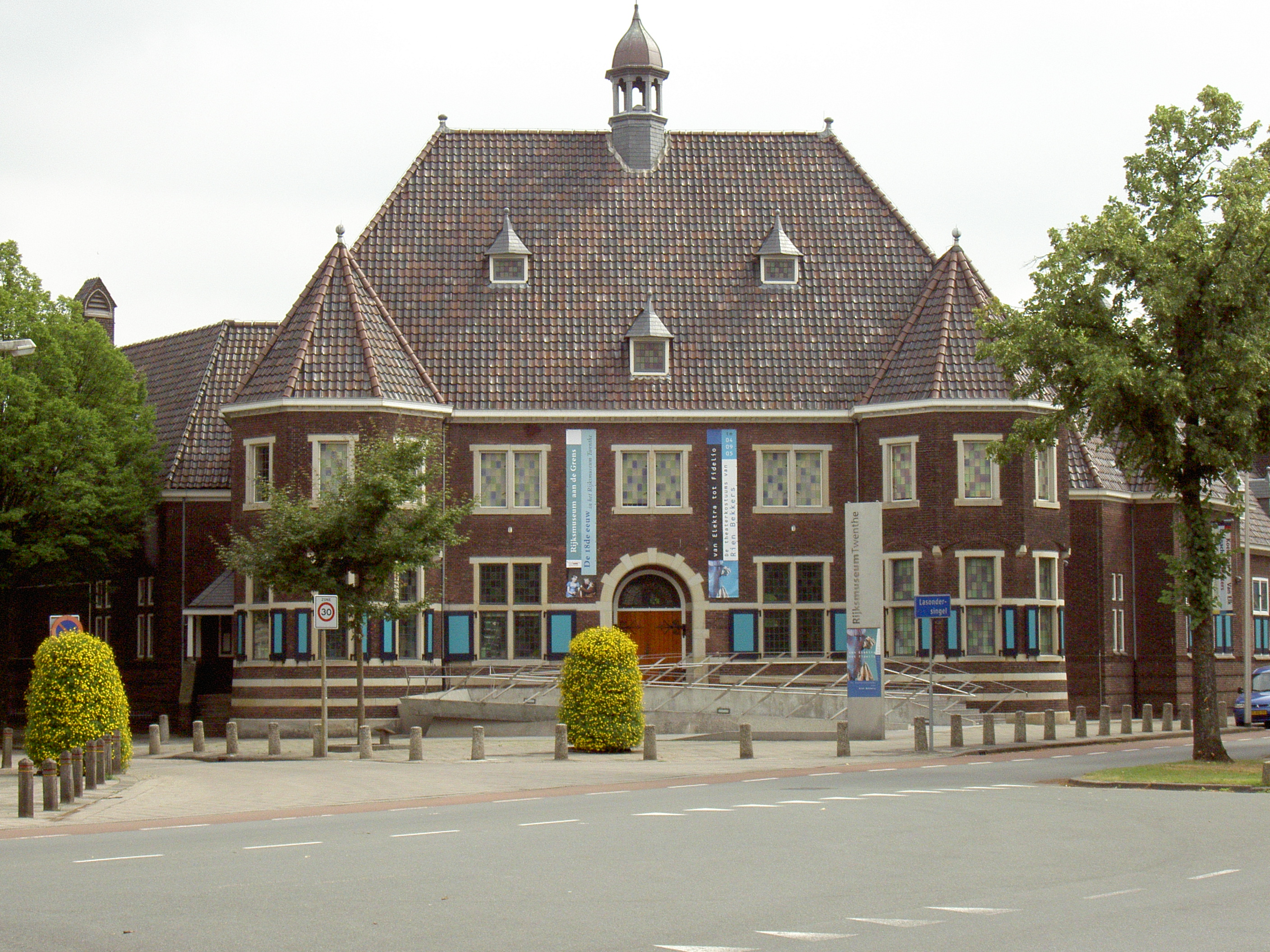
- Skyline of Enschede Historic city centre White House Synagogue of Enschede De Grolsch Veste St. James Church Rijksmuseum Twenthe Enschede,Netherlands

- Flag Coat of arms Brandmark
- Interactive map of Enschede
- Location within Overijssel Location within the Netherlands
- Coordinates: 52°13′21″N 06°53′33″E
- Country: Netherlands
- Province: Overijssel

Government
  - Body: Municipal council
  - Mayor: Roelof Bleker (Independent)

Area
  - Municipality: 142.72 km^{2} (55.10 sq mi)
  - Land: 140.83 km^{2} (54.37 sq mi)
  - Water: 1.89 km^{2} (0.73 sq mi)
- Elevation: 42 m (138 ft)

Population (Municipality, January 2021; Urban and Metro, May 2014)
  - Municipality: 160,341
  - Density: 1,134/km^{2} (2,940/sq mi)
  - Urban: 158,004
  - Metro: 315,807
  - Twente: 626,586
- Demonym: Enschedeër
- Time zone: UTC+01:00 (CET)
  - Summer (DST): UTC+02:00 (CEST)
- Postcode: 7500–7549
- Area code: 053
- Website: www.enschede.nl

Enschede (Dutch: [ˈɛnsxədeː]; local Twents: Eanske [ˈɛːnskə]) is a city and municipality in the province of Overijssel and the Twente region of the eastern Netherlands. The east of the urban area reaches the border of the German town of Gronau.

Enschede began as a small settlement in the Middle Ages and was granted city rights in 1325. It grew as a regional centre for trade and agriculture before becoming a major hub of the textile industry in the 18th and 19th centuries. Until 1935, the municipality of Enschede consisted only of the city of Enschede, when the rural municipality of Lonneker, which surrounded the city, was annexed after the rapid industrial expansion of Enschede that began in the 1860s and involved the building of railways and the digging of the Twentekanaal.

Enschede is home to the football club FC Twente, a one-time Dutch champion; the University of Twente; Saxion University of Applied Sciences and the last Polaroid film factory.

== History ==
=== Preindustrial era ===
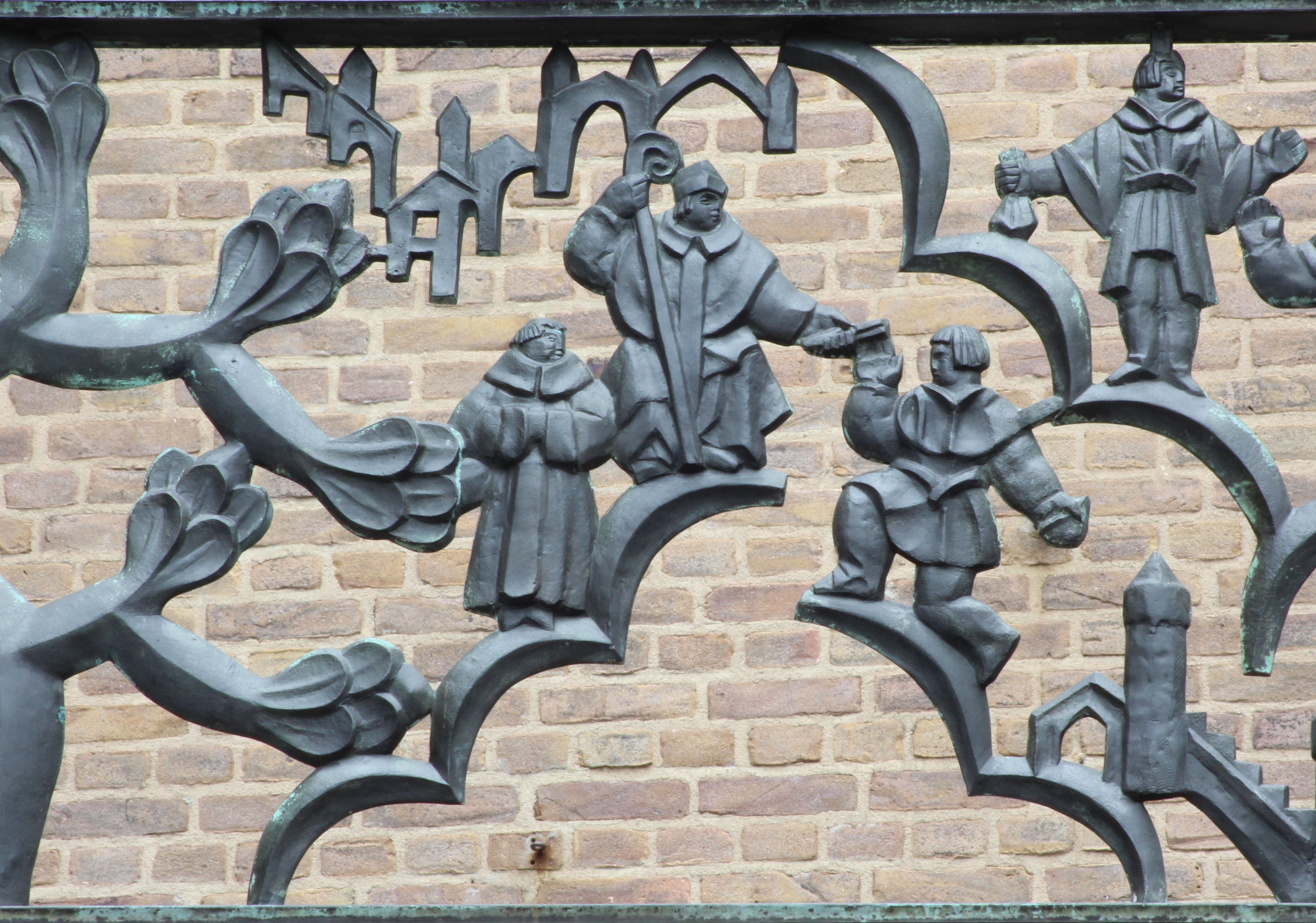
Balcony of the city hall depicts Enschede receiving its city rights.

The early history of Enschede is largely unknown, but a settlement existed around the Old Marketplace in early medieval times. The name of this settlement is mentioned as Anescede or Enscede meaning either "near the border" (with Bentheim) or "near the Es" and sported a church, a marketplace and a fortified aristocratic house.

Enschede was granted city rights around 1300 which were confirmed in 1325 by Bishop Jan III van Diest and henceforth was allowed to protect itself with a wall. Because a stone wall was too expensive (since stone had to be imported), Enschede had a system of ditches, palisades and hedges instead, which is still reflected in the street-names Noorderhagen and Zuiderhagen (North Hedge and South Hedge, respectively). The city plan of this era is still recognisable in the street-pattern. The city was spared destruction in 1597 at its capture during the Eighty Years' War when after a short siege, the Spanish garrison surrendered the city and the defences were razed.

Because the medieval city was largely built of wood and stone houses were the exception, fire was a constant risk and a series of fires in 1517, 1750 and again on 7 May 1862 earned the people from Enschede the nickname Brandstichters (arsonists).

=== Industrial era ===
The last fire coincided with the start of the growth of the city into a large production center for textiles, stimulating a large increase in population, which by 1894 had reached an estimated 18,267: nineteenth-century urban growth was at first rather chaotic. The names of the slums (like De Krim and Sebastopol) are still notorious, although they have long since been torn down. In 1907 the laissez faire mentality was dropped and Enschede was the first city in the Netherlands to draw up an official expansion plan, incorporating the surrounding municipality of Lonneker.

Textile production, originally a cottage industry, reached an industrial scale at the start of the 19th century. In particular, bombazijn (a mixture of cotton and linen) proved a successful export. One such factory to have produced textiles in the late 19th century is the Hardick & Seckel Factory.

=== World War II ===
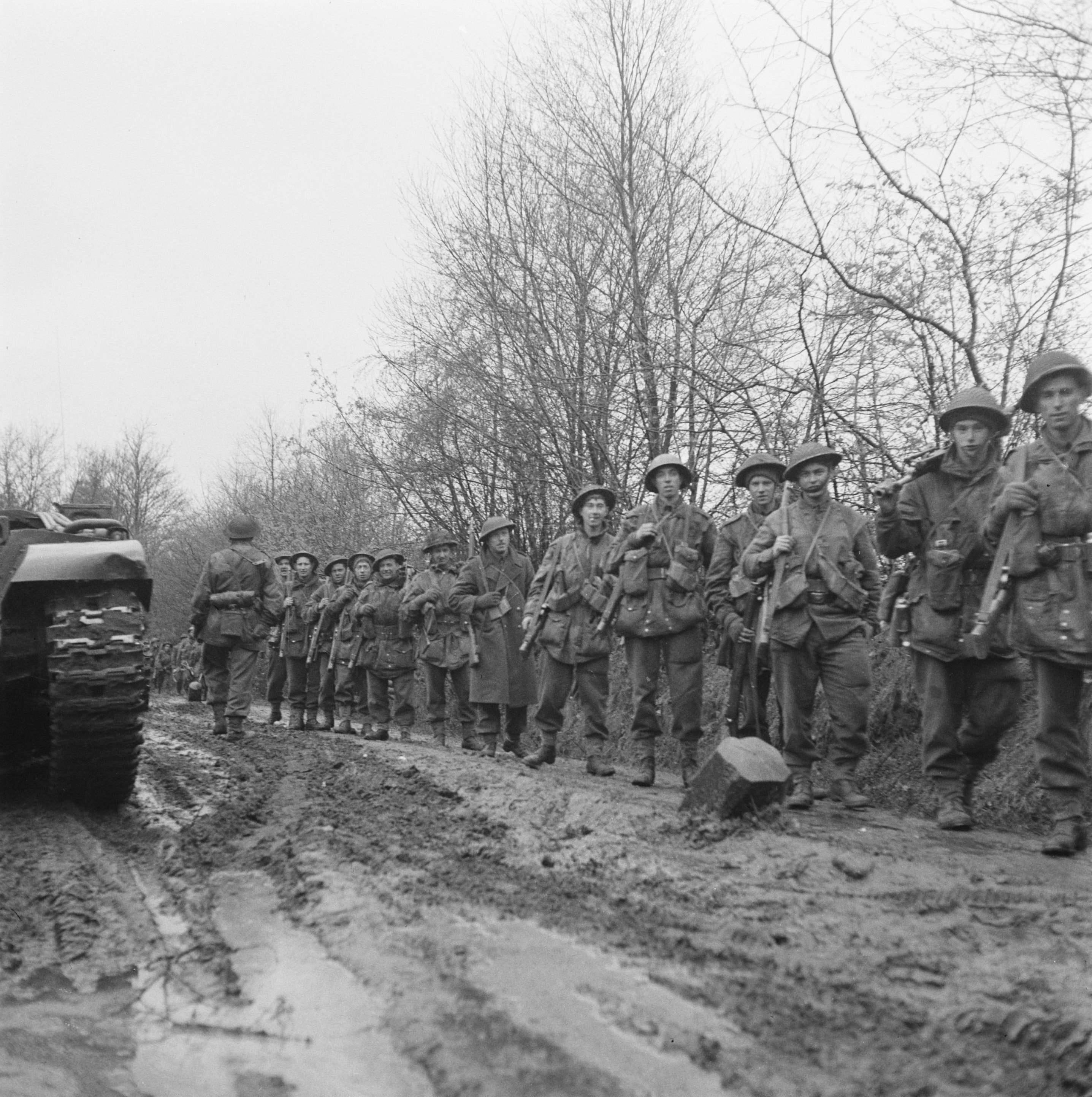
British troops advancing from Enschede, April 1945

During World War II, Enschede was one of the first Dutch cities to be captured by German troops due to its proximity to the German border. Resistance members helped many of the Jews from Enschede to hide on farms in the vicinity. Out of approximately 1300 Jews in Enschede, 500 were saved (38.5%), compared to less than 20% in the rest of the Netherlands. This higher survival rate is attributed to three members of the Jewish Council of Enschede, Sig Menko, Gerard Sanders and Isidoor Van Dam who took the initiative, against the advice of the Jewish Council of Amsterdam, of urging their community to go into hiding and not to answer the call-up of the Germans for "labour in the East." Another notable hero of the era was Enschede Pastor Leendert Overduin, who saved hundreds of Jewish children and adults, with help from his sister and others, through a network of safehouses in and around Enschede.

Enschede was bombed on several occasions, most notably on 10 October 1943, and 22 February 1944. During the first raid the nearby airport (then Fliegerhorst Twente) was a target of opportunity for the VIII Bomber Command during a raid on rail- and waterways in Münster. 141 people died and many houses were damaged. The latter mission named Enschede as a target of opportunity during Big Week after bombers had been recalled due to adverse weather.

=== The end of the industrial age ===
In the 1960s, the textile industry was completely lost, at the cost of approximately 30,000 jobs. Most of the large factory complexes were demolished in the 1970s and 1980s, some were renovated and given a new purpose. For example, homes were built in the former factories of Jannink and Van Heek. In addition, part of the Jannink complex was converted into a museum. Enschede developed into a service city.

In the 1970s, the textile production in Enschede came to a halt, due to fierce competition from mainly the Far East. This had a profound effect on the populace. Enschede became one of the poorest municipalities in the Netherlands and went bankrupt. Large areas of industrial wasteland came to mark the city. With the support of the national government, this property was acquired and rebuilt. The city center was rendered a car-free zone.

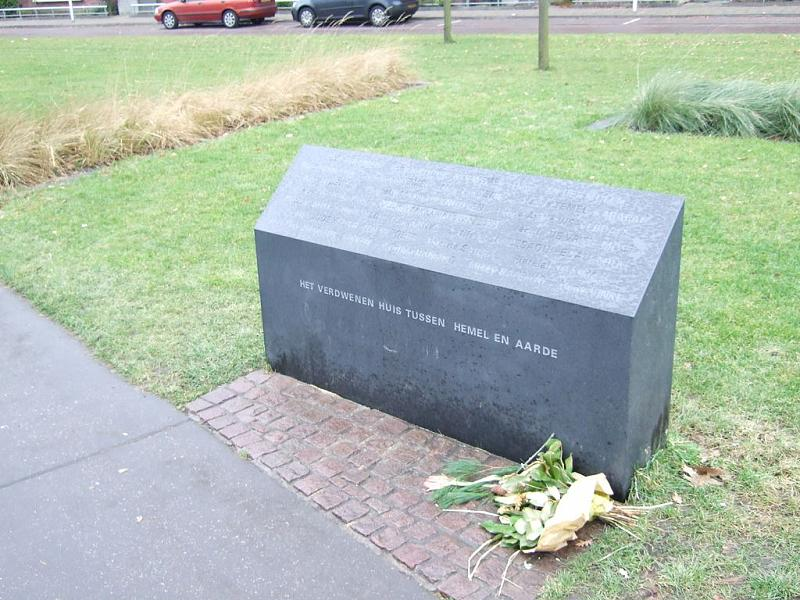
Monument commemorating the Enschede fireworks disaster. The inscription says: "The vanished house between heaven and earth."

In 1961, it was announced that a third technical university would be founded, placed on an estate on the western border of Enschede. This green campus called Drienerlo was donated by the city of Enschede. Building was complete in 1964, when the first and only full-facility university of the Netherlands was realised.

On 13 May 2000, a fireworks storage depot in Enschede exploded, destroying part of the neighborhood of Roombeek and killing 23 people, including 4 firemen. In 2001, a referendum confirmed the proposal of the city council to expand the built-up area into the Usseler Es, an area of historic cultural significance and of geological importance, as it was here that the Usselo horizon was discovered. The renovations at Roombeek were finished in the year 2012. The place where the factory used to be is now a monument.

The Alpha Tower was completed in 2008 and this tower block with 91 apartments spread over 29 floors, with a height of 101 meters, is the tallest building in Enschede and the whole province of Overijssel. In the period 1995–2010, Enschede grew by approximately 10,000 inhabitants, but since then the growth has stagnated.

== Geography ==
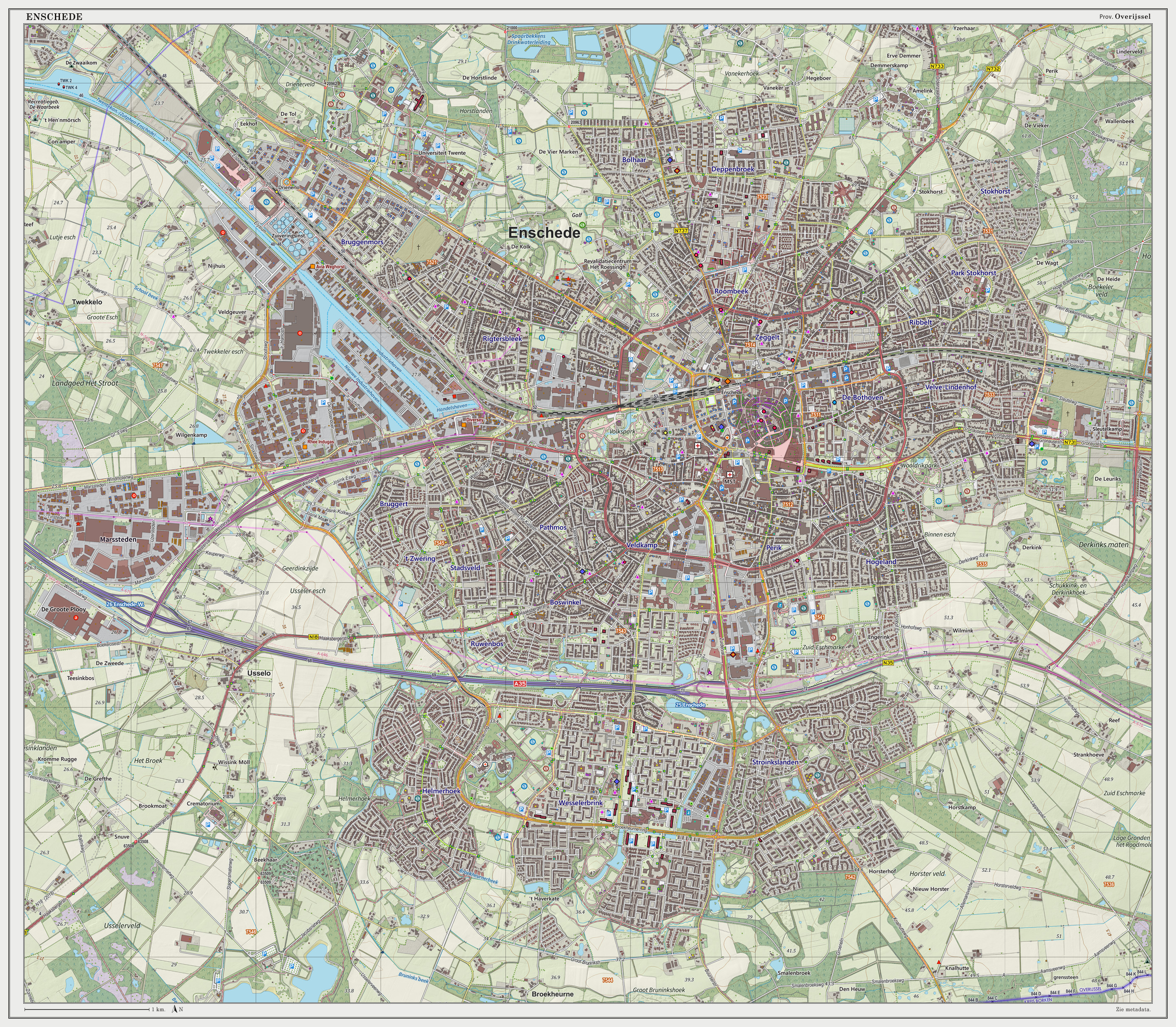
Dutch Topographic map of Enschede (city), June 2014

Enschede lies in the eastern part of Overijssel and is the easternmost city of more than 140,000 inhabitants in the Netherlands. The city lies a few kilometres from Germany, which borders the municipality. A few small rivers flow through or surround the city, such as the Roombeek and Glanerbeek.

Enschede contains five official city districts, which also include surrounding villages in the municipality:

- Stadsdeel Centrum (Binnenstad, Boddenkamp, De Bothoven, 't Getfert, Hogeland Noord, Horstlanden-Veldkamp, Laares, Lasonder-'t Zeggelt)
- Stadsdeel Noord (for example: Lonneker, Deppenbroek, Bolhaar, Mekkelholt, Roombeek, Twekkelerveld)
- Stadsdeel Oost (for example: Wooldrik, Velve-Lindenhof, De Eschmarke, 't Ribbelt, Stokhorst, Dolphia, 't Hogeland and Glanerbrug)
- Stadsdeel Zuid (Wesselerbrink, Helmerhoek and Stroinkslanden)
- Stadsdeel West (Boswinkel, Ruwenbos, Pathmos, Stadsveld, Bruggert, 't Zwering, 't Havengebied, De Marssteden, Boekelo, Usselo and Twekkelo)

=== Climate ===
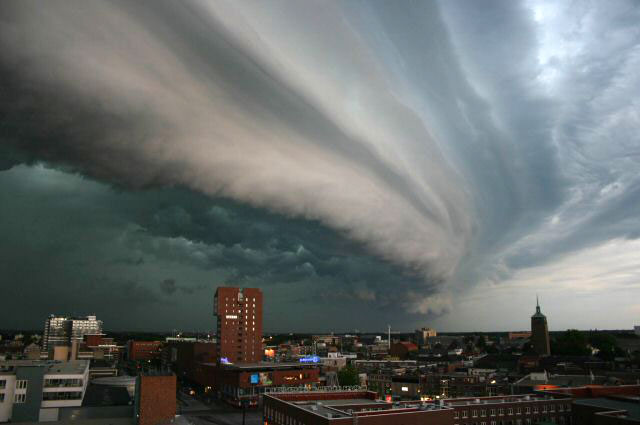
A shelf cloud associated with a heavy or severe thunderstorm over Enschede

Like most of the Netherlands, Enschede features an oceanic climate (Cfb in the Köppen classification), however, winters tend to be less mild than the rest of the Netherlands due to its inland location. Although the former military airport is derelict and plans to revive the place were canceled in 2012, the Royal Netherlands Meteorological Institute still maintains a weather station there.

Climate data for Twenthe, Enschede (1991–2020 normals, extremes 1951–present)
Month	Jan	Feb	Mar	Apr	May	Jun	Jul	Aug	Sep	Oct	Nov	Dec	Year
Record high °C (°F)	14.5 (58.1)	19.5 (67.1)	24.5 (76.1)	29.3 (84.7)	31.8 (89.2)	35.4 (95.7)	40.2 (104.4)	36.2 (97.2)	32.1 (89.8)	27.9 (82.2)	19.8 (67.6)	16.3 (61.3)	40.2 (104.4)
Mean daily maximum °C (°F)	5.3 (41.5)	6.3 (43.3)	10.1 (50.2)	14.9 (58.8)	18.6 (65.5)	21.4 (70.5)	23.6 (74.5)	23.2 (73.8)	19.3 (66.7)	14.4 (57.9)	9.2 (48.6)	5.8 (42.4)	14.3 (57.7)
Daily mean °C (°F)	2.8 (37.0)	3.2 (37.8)	5.8 (42.4)	9.6 (49.3)	13.2 (55.8)	16.0 (60.8)	18.1 (64.6)	17.6 (63.7)	14.2 (57.6)	10.3 (50.5)	6.3 (43.3)	3.5 (38.3)	10.0 (50.0)
Mean daily minimum °C (°F)	-0.0 (32.0)	−0.2 (31.6)	1.3 (34.3)	3.5 (38.3)	7.0 (44.6)	9.8 (49.6)	12.1 (53.8)	11.7 (53.1)	9.1 (48.4)	6.2 (43.2)	3.1 (37.6)	0.8 (33.4)	5.4 (41.7)
Record low °C (°F)	−21.8 (−7.2)	−21.8 (−7.2)	−16.8 (1.8)	−8.8 (16.2)	−3.9 (25.0)	−0.6 (30.9)	3.0 (37.4)	1.3 (34.3)	−3.5 (25.7)	−8.5 (16.7)	−11.4 (11.5)	−16.3 (2.7)	−21.8 (−7.2)
Average precipitation mm (inches)	70.8 (2.79)	55.4 (2.18)	58.1 (2.29)	43.7 (1.72)	57.2 (2.25)	64.8 (2.55)	77.6 (3.06)	79.4 (3.13)	67.3 (2.65)	67.5 (2.66)	66.1 (2.60)	76.4 (3.01)	784.3 (30.88)
Average relative humidity (%)	87.1	83.9	78.9	72.6	73.2	75.2	76.0	77.9	83.0	86.1	89.1	89.1	81.0
Mean monthly sunshine hours	59.4	87.7	135.7	187.8	211.2	202.1	214.0	195.5	154.1	119.4	64.9	53.2	1,685
Percentage possible sunshine	23.0	31.2	36.7	45.0	43.4	40.4	42.5	42.9	40.4	36.1	24.4	22.0	35.7
Source: Royal Netherlands Meteorological Institute

== Religion ==
Religions in Enschede (2013)
1. No affiliation (58.9%)
2. Roman Catholic (17.1%)
3. Protestant Church in the Netherlands (13.7%)
4. Other Christian denominations (6.10%)
5. Islam (3.00%)
6. Hinduism (0.80%)
7. Buddhism (0.30%)
8. Judaism (0.10%)

The largest religion in Enschede is Christianity with 34.9% of the population being Christian.

Enschede has a large Assyrian community, the first Assyrians came to Enschede in the 1970s, primarily from Turkey (Tur Abdin). Today there are three Syriac Orthodox Churches in the city which meet the spiritual needs of Enschede's more than 10,000 Assyrians.

== Demographics ==
As of 2020, Enschede had a total population of 159,640 people.

=== Inhabitants by origin ===
2020	Numbers	%
Dutch natives	111,322	69.7%
Western migration background	20,417	12.7%
Non-Western migration background	27,901	17.4%
Turkey	8,758	5.4%
Indonesia	3,282	2.05%
Morocco	2,090	1.3%
Suriname	1,971	1.23%
Netherlands Antilles and Aruba	1,174	0.74%
Total	159,640	100%

== Economy ==
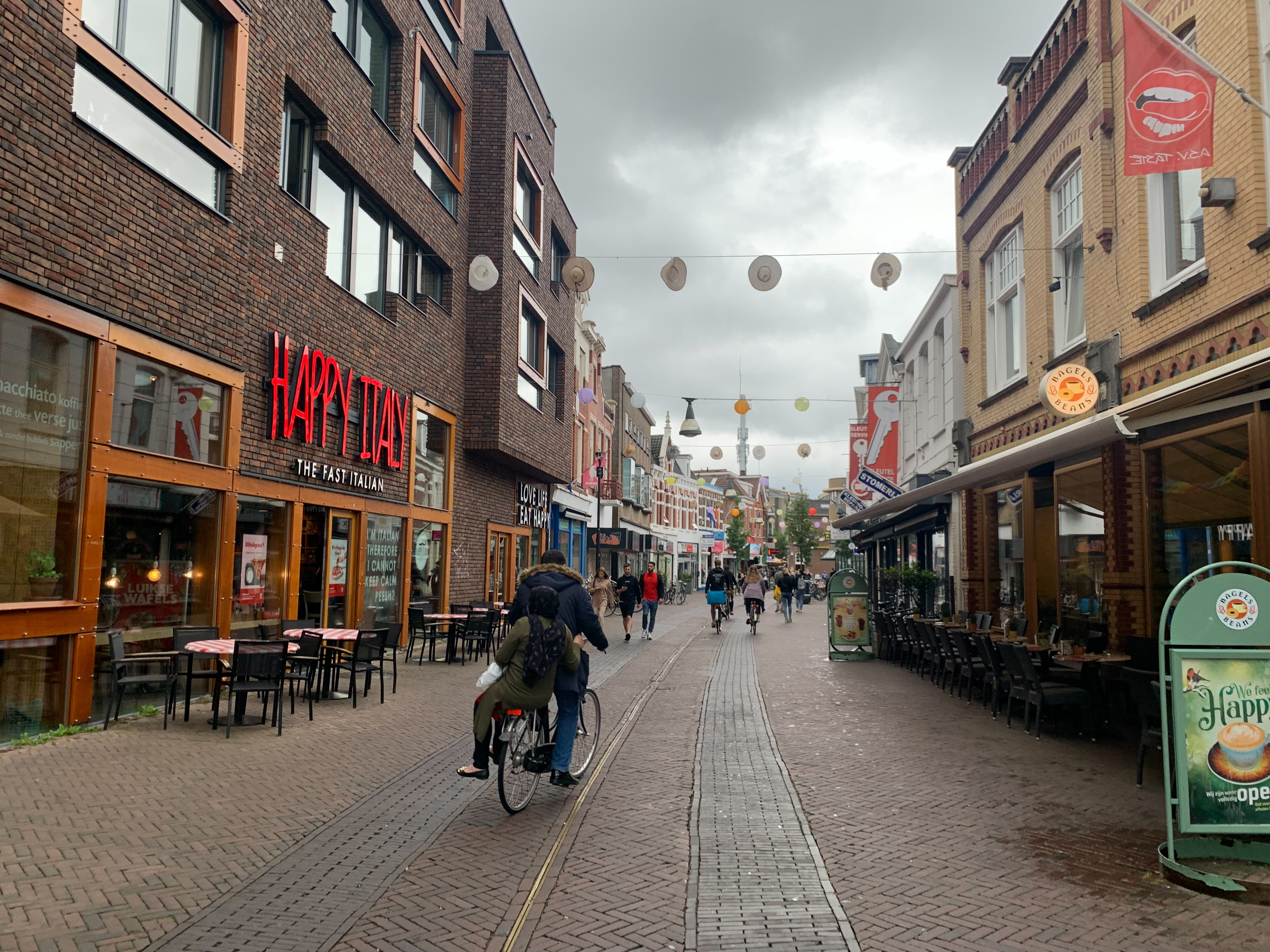
Enschede city center

The city is a former centre of textile production. When this industry left the area for cheaper production centers in South-East Asia, Enschede became one of the poorest municipalities in the Netherlands. More educated and wealthier citizens have historically migrated to the Randstad region; decades of renovation work in the city center have been carried out with the goal of making Enschede more attractive to this group. Modern shopping centres and department stores that until recently were only found in much larger cities have been opened. Enschede is host to many yearly festivals and the Old Market Square is often the venue for events, live music and other activities at the weekend.

The proximity to Germany has, historically, been another major factor in the city's economic activity, ranging from the smuggling of coffee and tobacco in the 19th and 20th century, to large numbers of Germans, who visit the city's shops and weekly markets. Therefore, many natives of Enschede speak German more or less fluently.

The city is co-operating with the nearby municipalities of Almelo, Borne and Hengelo as Netwerkstad Twente. A draft law plan to merge Enschede with Hengelo and Almelo was defeated in parliament under the influence of opposition from the other towns.

There are over 95,000 jobs in Enschede. Most businesses can be found on one the business parks in the city or the port of Enschede (inland water port).

Grolsch beer is brewed in Enschede, and the tyre manufacturer Apollo Vredestein B.V. head office and a factory are in the city. It now looks like the factory in Enschede will close in 2025.

Other major employers are University of Twente, Saxion University of applied sciences, MST medical centre, Health insurance company Menzis, foodcompany Huuskes and Rabobank.

== Culture ==
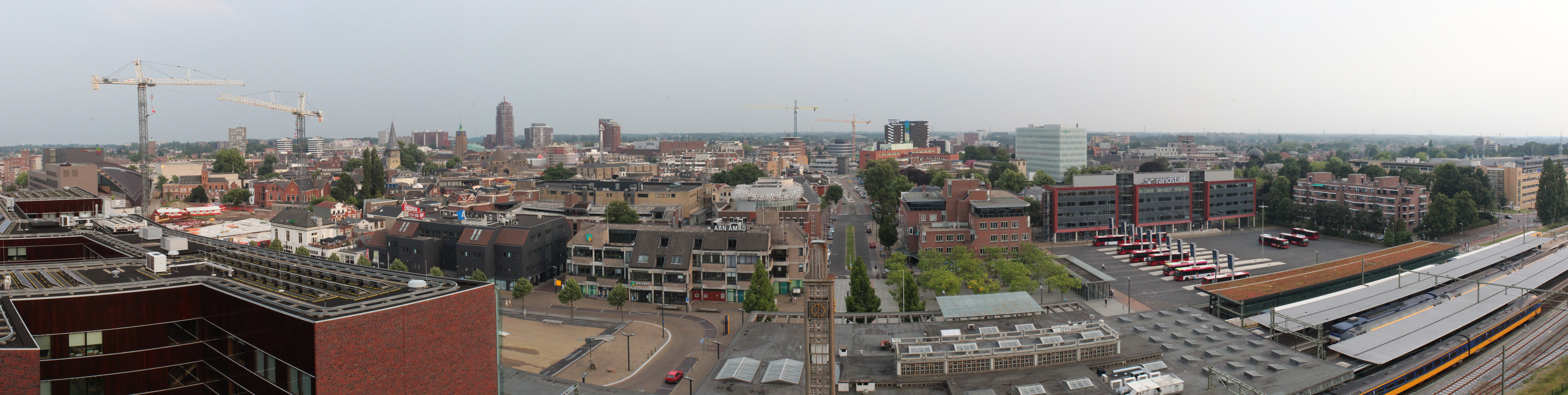
Panorama of Enschede

=== Museum ===
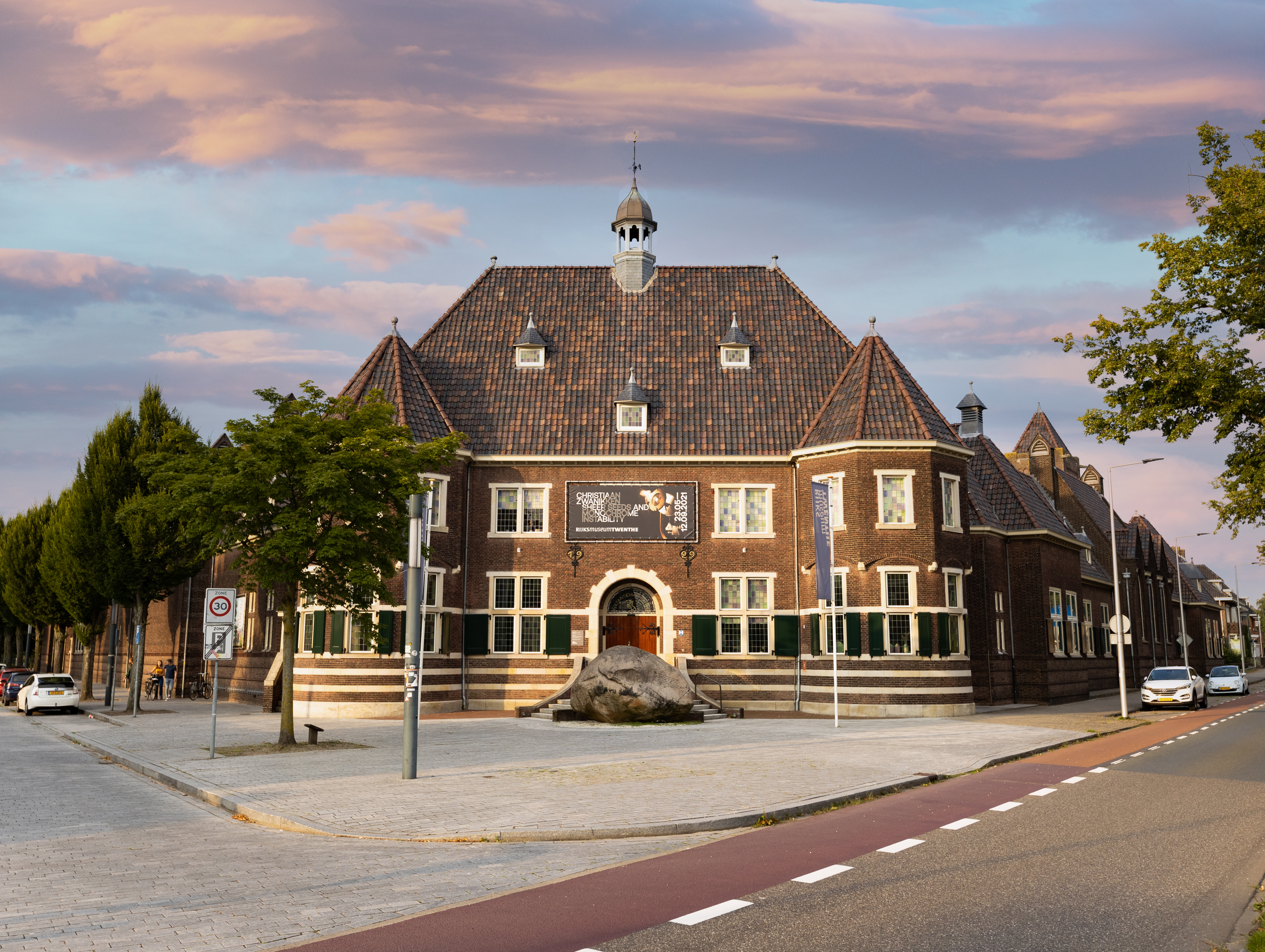
Rijksmuseum Twenthe

There are several museums in Enschede, among them the Rijksmuseum Twenthe for art. A museum of natural history and a museum dedicated to the history of the textiles industry, both closed in January 2007, have merged, and have reopened in April 2008 in new premises on a new location under the name TwentseWelle (Source/Well of Twente). The new location is situated in Roombeek, where a fireworks disaster took place in 2000. The new museum is located partly in a renovated old textile factory, in reference to Enschede's textile history, and partly in an adjourning new building, designed by the Amsterdam-based firm SeARCH (project architect: Bjarne Mastenbroek). Besides museums there are also several art spaces, the most prominent being Villa de Bank and TETEM. The latter focuses on art and technology, and aims to be accessible for a wide public. Enschede is also home of The Netherlands Symphony Orchestra.

De Museumfabriek (formerly TwensteWelle) is a museum in the Roombeek district that arose from a merger of three institutions: Natuurmuseum Enschede, Van Deinse Instituut and Fabriekcomplex Jannink. In this museum, the cultural-historical heritage of Twente is linked to the natural-historical heritage, a unique combination for the Netherlands. The museum was opened in April 2008 by the then Queen Beatrix.

=== Music and theater ===
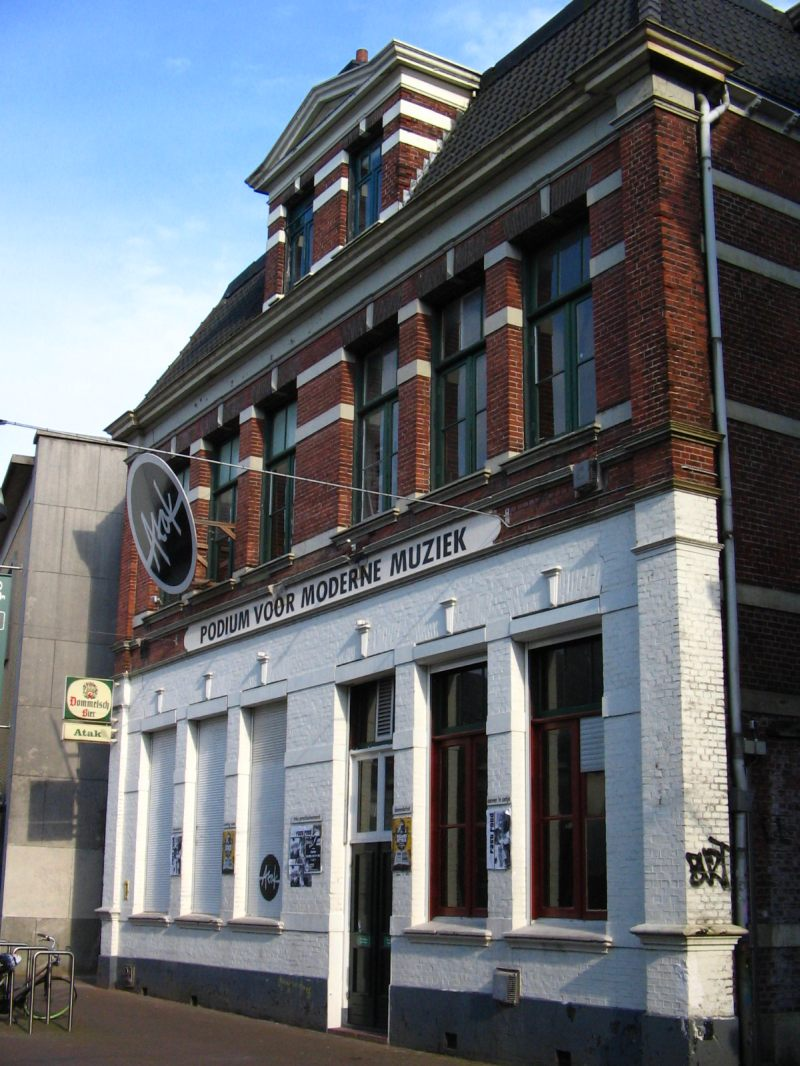
Former building of Atak Poppodium

The German-Dutch relationship is characteristic of music culture, which arose through cooperation in the border region and the dominant textile industry in the 19th and 20th centuries. Especially during the period of reversal after the World War I, a close German-Dutch cultural cooperation developed in Gronau and Enschede, which became increasingly important from string quartets, salon orchestras and hot dance music bands to symphony orchestras and an operetta company ("Enschedesch Opera en Operette Gezelschap") with their own performances. At the same time, jazz also found enthusiastic supporters from 1920 onwards.

The three major concert stages for classical music in Enschede – the Muziekcentrum, the Twentse Schouwburg and the Grote Kerk – have been operating under the name Podium Twente since September 2002 and since September 2011 under the name Wilminktheater en Muziekcentrum Enschede. There is a varied offer of concerts, theater, youth and youth performances and the like to visit.

In November 2008 the Nationaal Muziekkwartier opened its doors in Enschede. A new large theatre, pop stage Atak, the ArtEZ Conservatory, the Orkest van het Oosten (now the Dutch Symphony Orchestra), the Twente Music School, the Nationale Reisopera (now the Nederlandse Reisopera) and Podium Twente (now Wilminktheater en Muziekcentrum Enschede) have settled in this dominant building opposite the Central Station in Enschede. There will be a new large square, the Willem Wilminkplein.

In December 2012, the Serious Request action from national radio station 3FM took place in Enschede, which collected more than 12.2 million euros (almost US$16.2 million).

== Research, education and health care ==
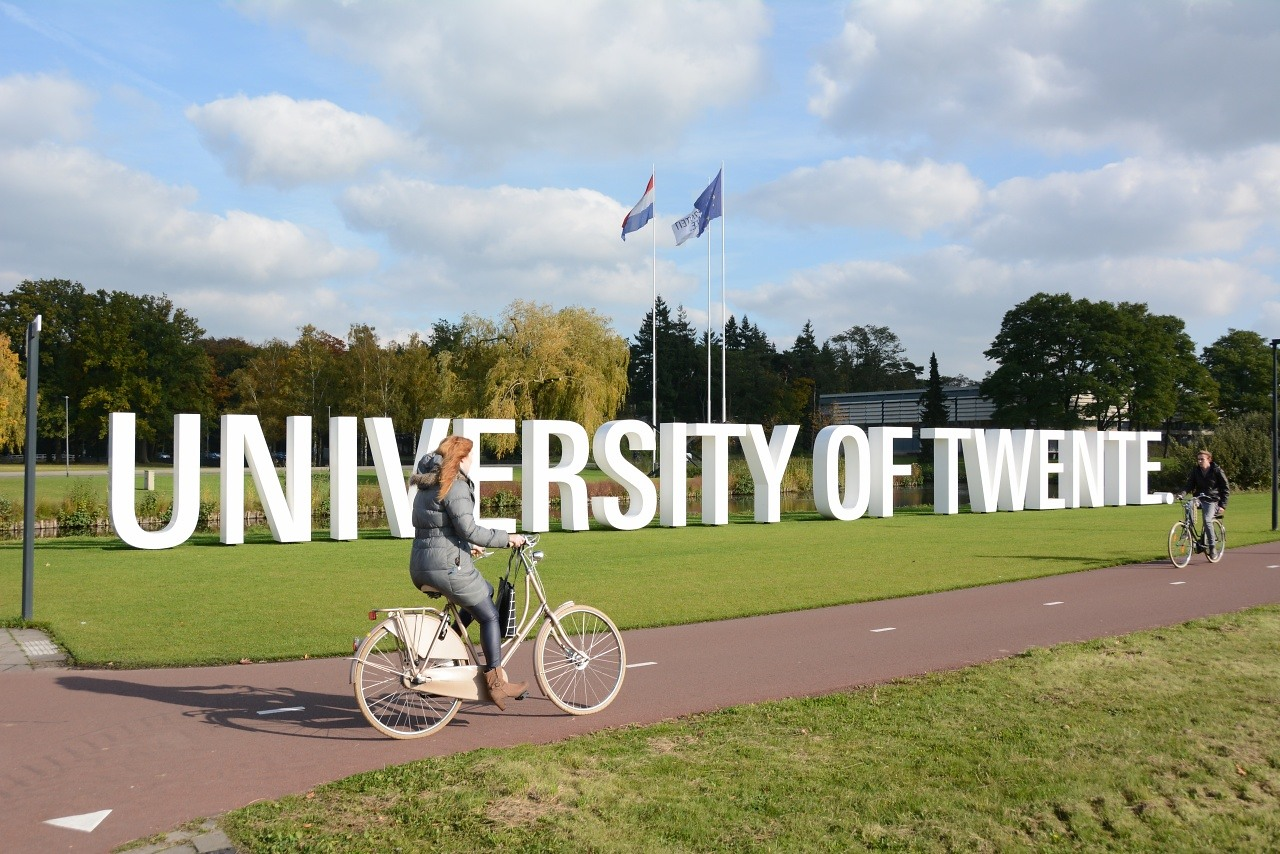
University of Twente

The University of Twente (Universiteit Twente), a university with mostly technical studies, is located in Enschede. It is one of the four technical universities in the Netherlands (besides Delft University of Technology, Eindhoven University of Technology and the Wageningen University and Research Centre). The Universiteit Twente is also the only large-campus university in the Netherlands.

The university has courses in pure technical studies such as Applied Physics, Applied Mathematics, Mechanical Engineering, Electrical Engineering, Chemical Engineering, Informatics/Computer Science and Industrial Engineering and also offers study programmes in Communication, Psychology, Economic Sciences, International Business Administration, Public Administration, Applied Medicine and Biomedical Technology; the latter attract a broader public. Since 2006, the programmes of European Studies, Advanced Technology, Creative Technology and ATLAS University College have been added to the university's offerings.

The Faculty of Geo-Information Science and Earth Observation of the University of Twente, with former name International Institute for Aerospace Survey and Earth Sciences, (known by its abbreviation ITC) runs MSc, Master's, Diploma and PhD courses in Geo-Information Science for developing countries. Students from all over the world attend the ITC. Enschede also has an academy of arts and design combined with a conservatory named ArtEZ.

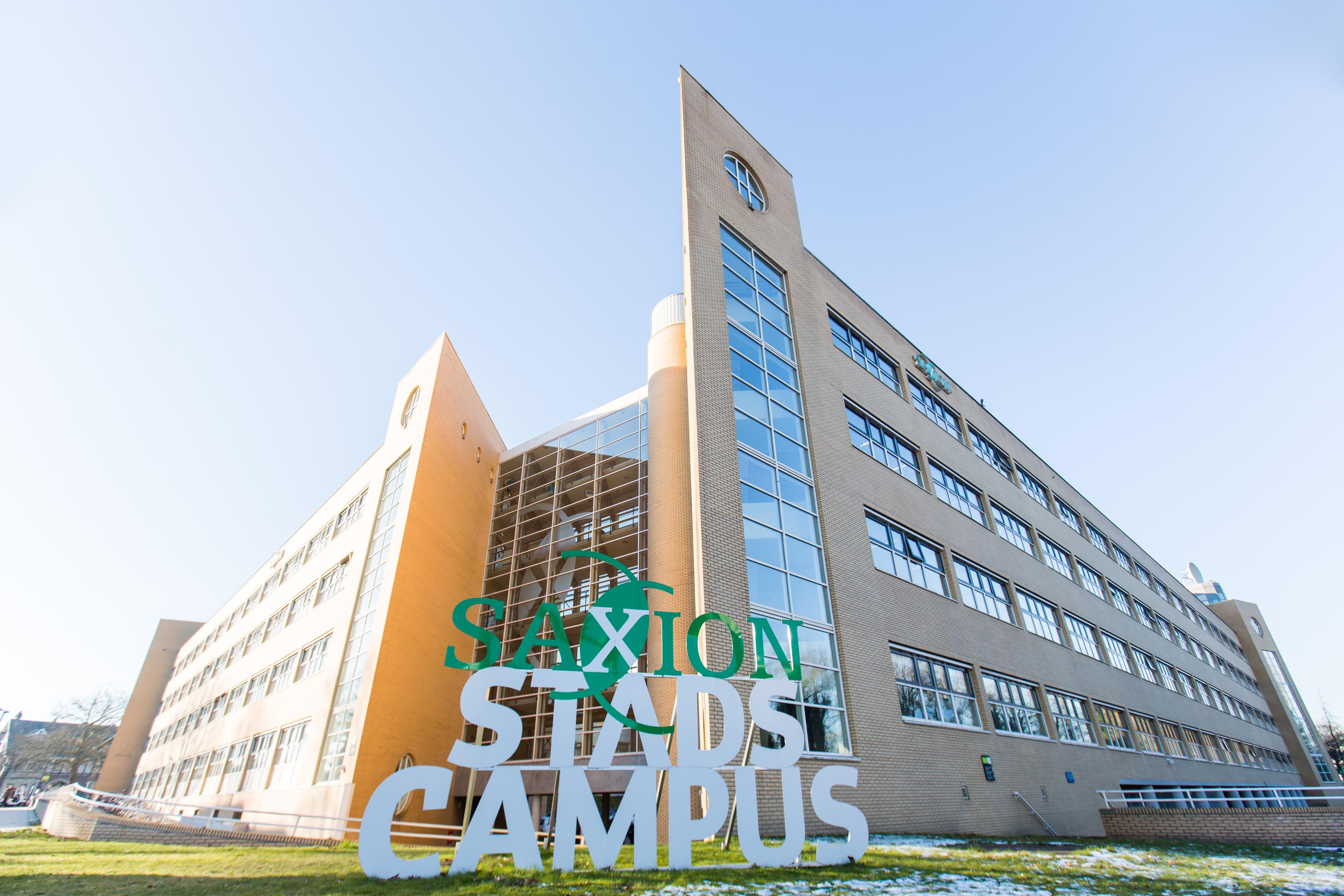
Saxion University of Applied Sciences

Enschede is also home to one of the three campuses of Saxion University of Applied Sciences (Saxion Hogeschool), a polytechnical school offering internationally recognized Bachelor's degrees and Master's degrees in a wide range of fields, including engineering, economics, social work, investigations and health care. The other campuses are located in Deventer and Apeldoorn.

The Medisch Spectrum Twente (MST) hospital is one of the largest top-clinical hospitals of the Netherlands and features important tertiary care departments, fulfilling a supraregional role. It includes a level I trauma center as well. The hospital is strongly involved in higher medical education, with up to 300 medical students following their internships in the hospital at any given time, closely working together with the University of Twente's Technical Medicine program training a new type of technically specialized doctors.

== Transport ==
=== Rail ===
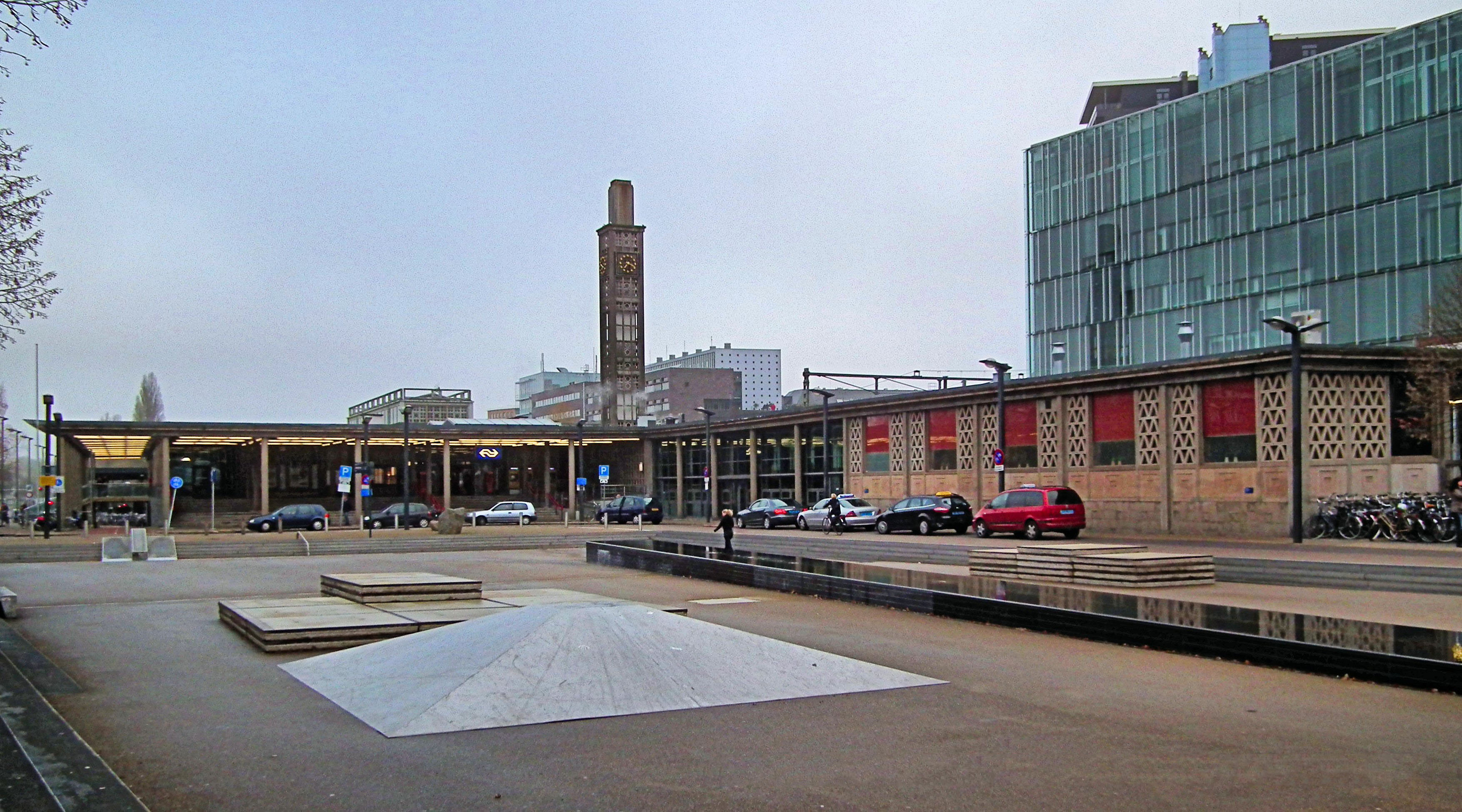
Enschede railway station

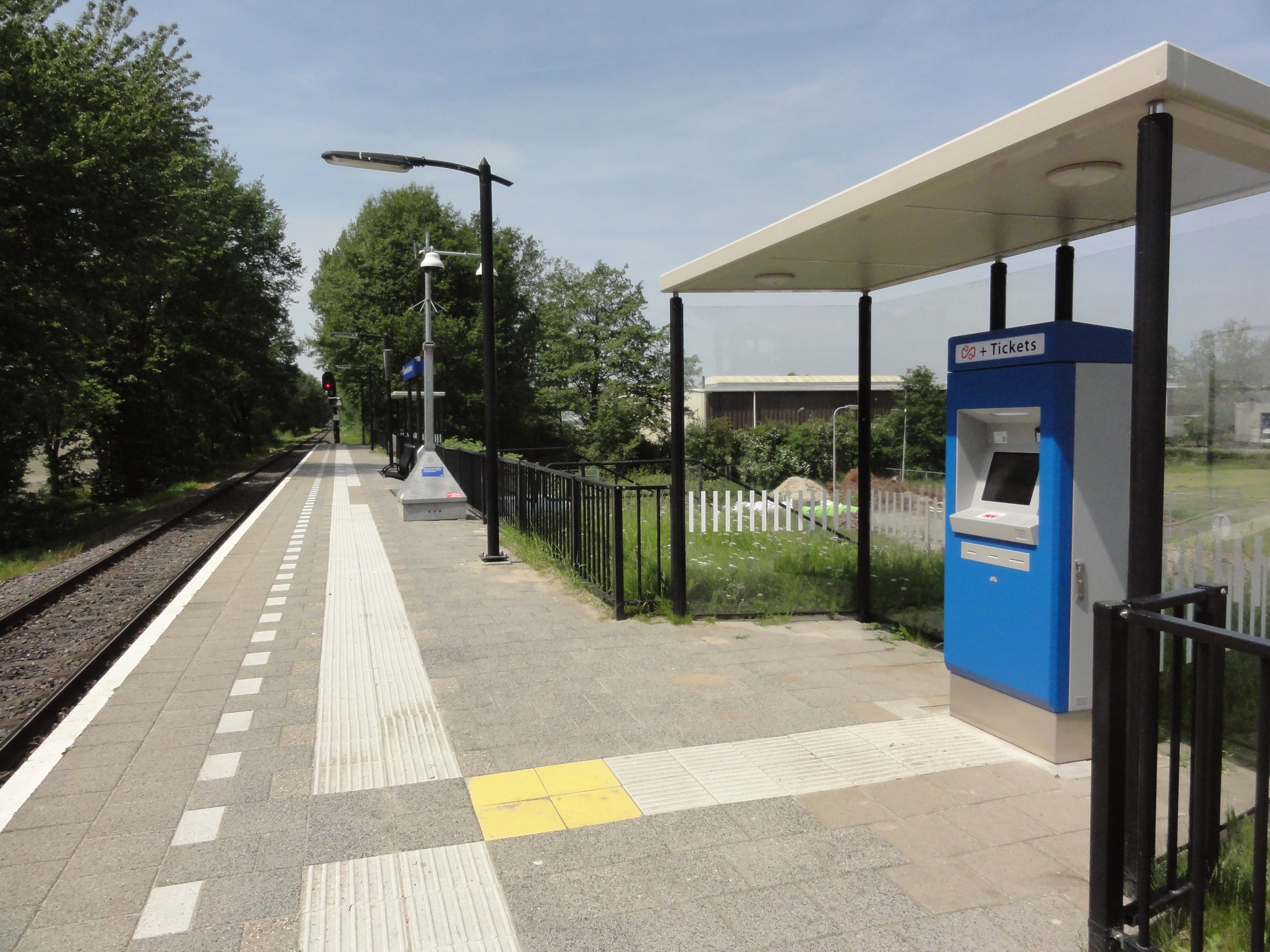
Enschede de Eschmarke stop

Enschede is a terminus station of the Nederlandse Spoorwegen (NS) railway lines from the west. Trains operate to Hengelo, Almelo, Zwolle, Deventer, Apeldoorn, Amersfoort Centraal, Hilversum, Amsterdam Zuid, Schiphol Airport, Utrecht Centraal and Den Haag Centraal.

To the east there is a line to Gronau, Germany, which has two more stations in the Netherlands: Enschede De Eschmarke and Glanerbrug. The latter two have low ridership. The line is served by DB Regionalbahn Westfalen (part of the German Deutsche Bahn), to Münster and to Dortmund, each on an hourly interval and alternating half-hours in the service to Gronau.

There is no track connection between the two systems. The through line had been retained for eventual NATO use during the Cold War even after through passenger service was ended (September 1981), although it was in serious disrepair in later years. With the renewal of service to Germany (May 2001) the track was severed; there is a gap of about 30 centimeters between them which means that Enschede is now a "double terminus station" with tracks to the West (the Netherlands) and to the East (Germany) but with no connection between them.

There is also Enschede Kennispark railway station, near the football stadium.

=== Water ===
Enschede is situated at the south-east terminus of the Twentekanaal.

=== Bus ===
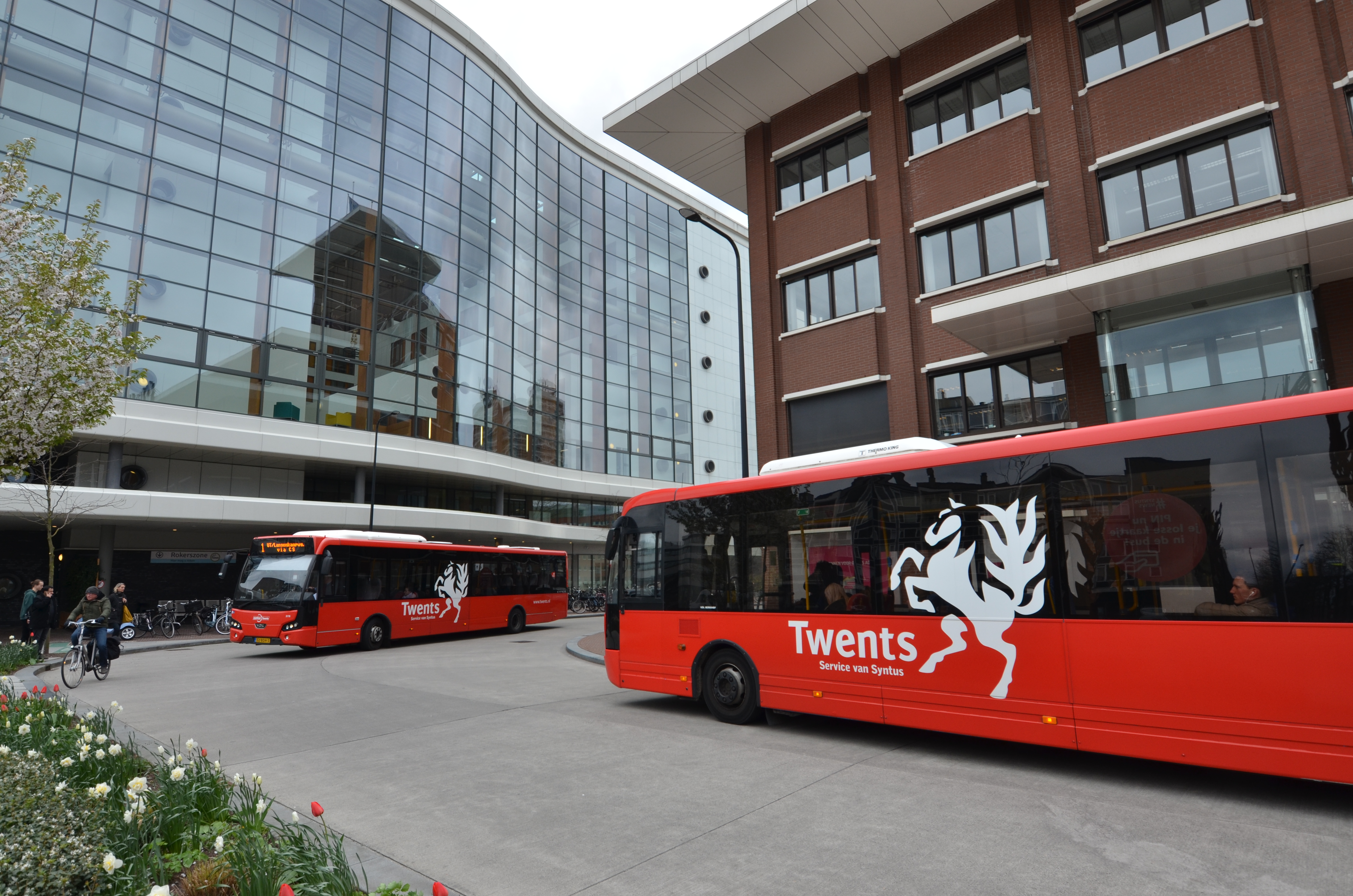
Twents buses from the previous concession (2013-2023) by Syntus in Enschede

There is a network of bus lines connecting nearly every part of the city with the centre. Enschede also has bus connections to nearby towns and cities, like Hengelo, Oldenzaal and south towards Haaksbergen, Neede and Eibergen. Since 10 December 2023 the bus lines are operated by Arriva, under the RRReis brand.

=== Air ===
Previously, Enschede had a combined regional civil airport, Enschede Airport, and Airbase Twenthe of the Royal Netherlands Air Force. The latter was closed in 2007; the former was closed in 2008. However, it remains in operation for business air traffic flying via a charter or private jet, and recreational flights. The nearest airports Münster Osnabrück Airport which is located 69 km away and Amsterdam's Schiphol Airport is located 174 km away west of Enschede.

=== Roads ===
Around the center districts of Enschede is a complete ring road with a length of approximately 8 km, which is popularly called "de singel". This was constructed in the period between 1916 and 1929. Most major arterial roads connect to the canal. Enschede is connected to the national road network by means of the A/N35 and the N18. Below and on the edge of the center are various parking facilities, the most famous and largest of which is the Van Heekgarage, which is located under the Van Heekplein. At the end of 2012, construction of an additional entrance and exit at Kuipersdijk was started as the South entrance. Van Heekgarage is the largest underground parking garage in the Netherlands with a capacity of 1650 cars.

== Sports ==
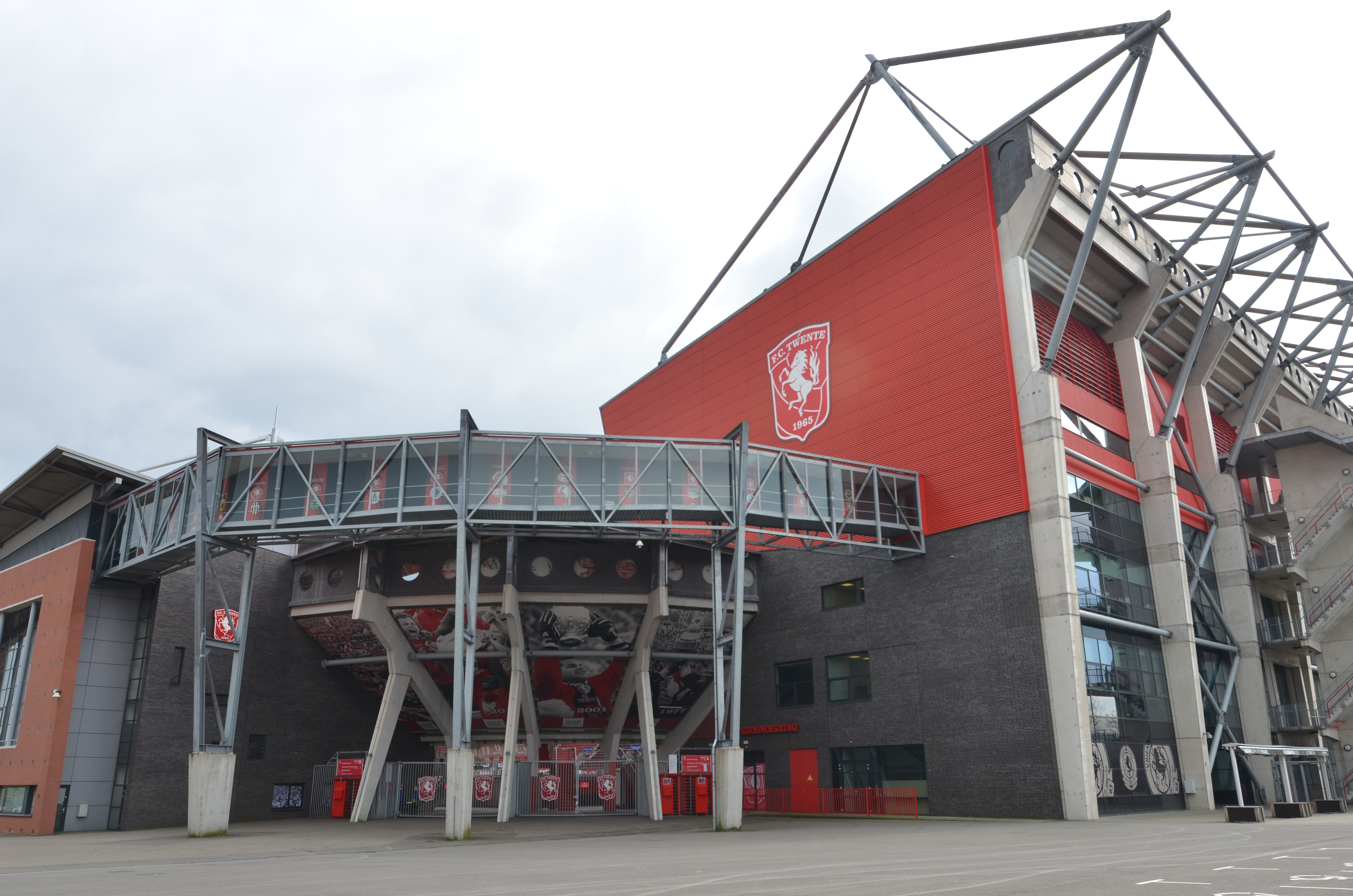
De Grolsch Veste, home ground of FC Twente

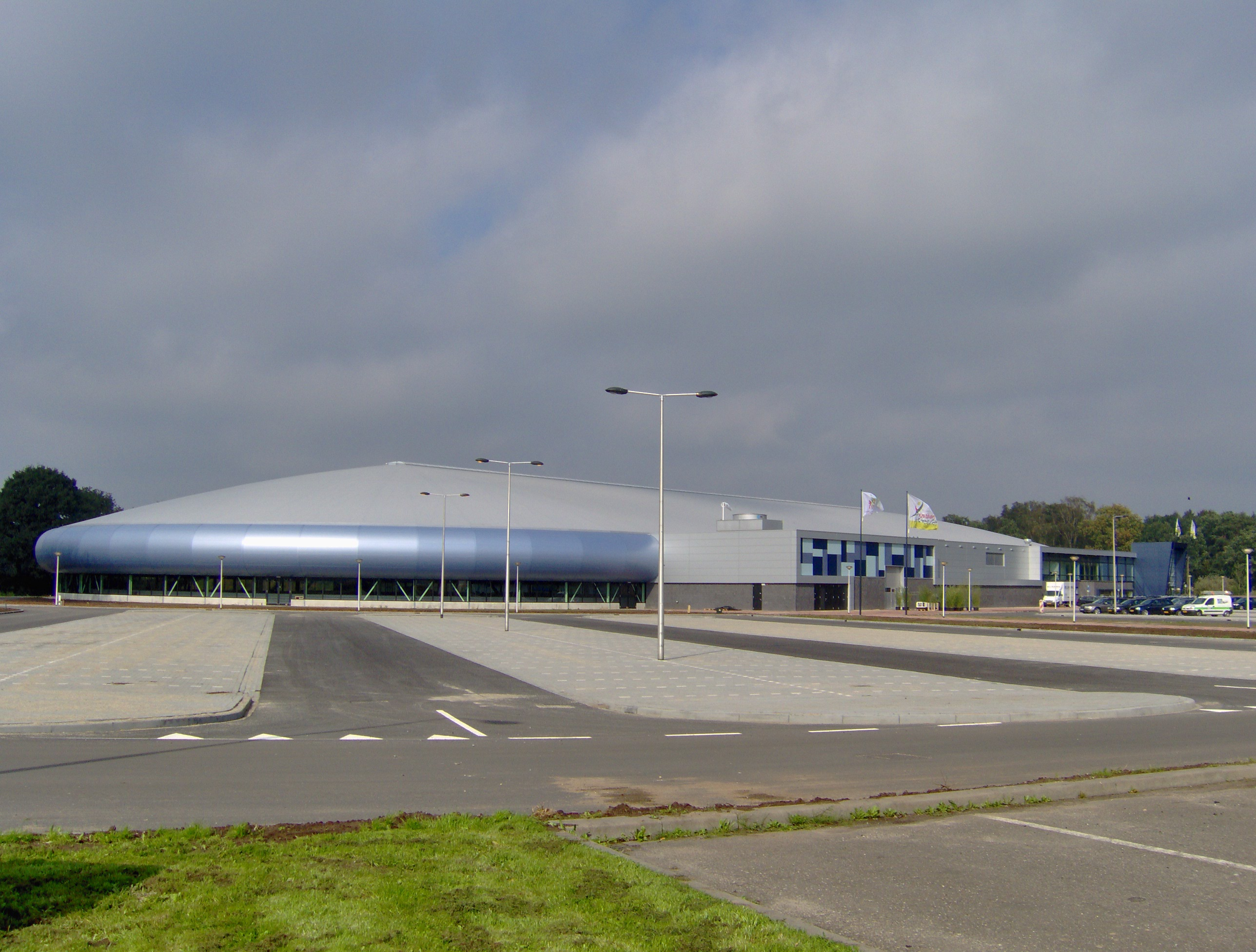
IJsbaan Twente

Enschede's association football club is FC Twente. Twente were the 2010 Eredivisie champions but were relegated to the second-tier league, the Eerste Divisie, after the 2017–18 season. Since the 2019–2020 season, they are back in the Eredivisie. De Grolsch Veste Stadium is the club's home base and has a capacity of 30,205 spectators. The Enschede Marathon is the second oldest marathon in Europe, and the oldest in the Netherlands, having been run annually since 1947. DOS-WK played in the Korfbal League until 2006.

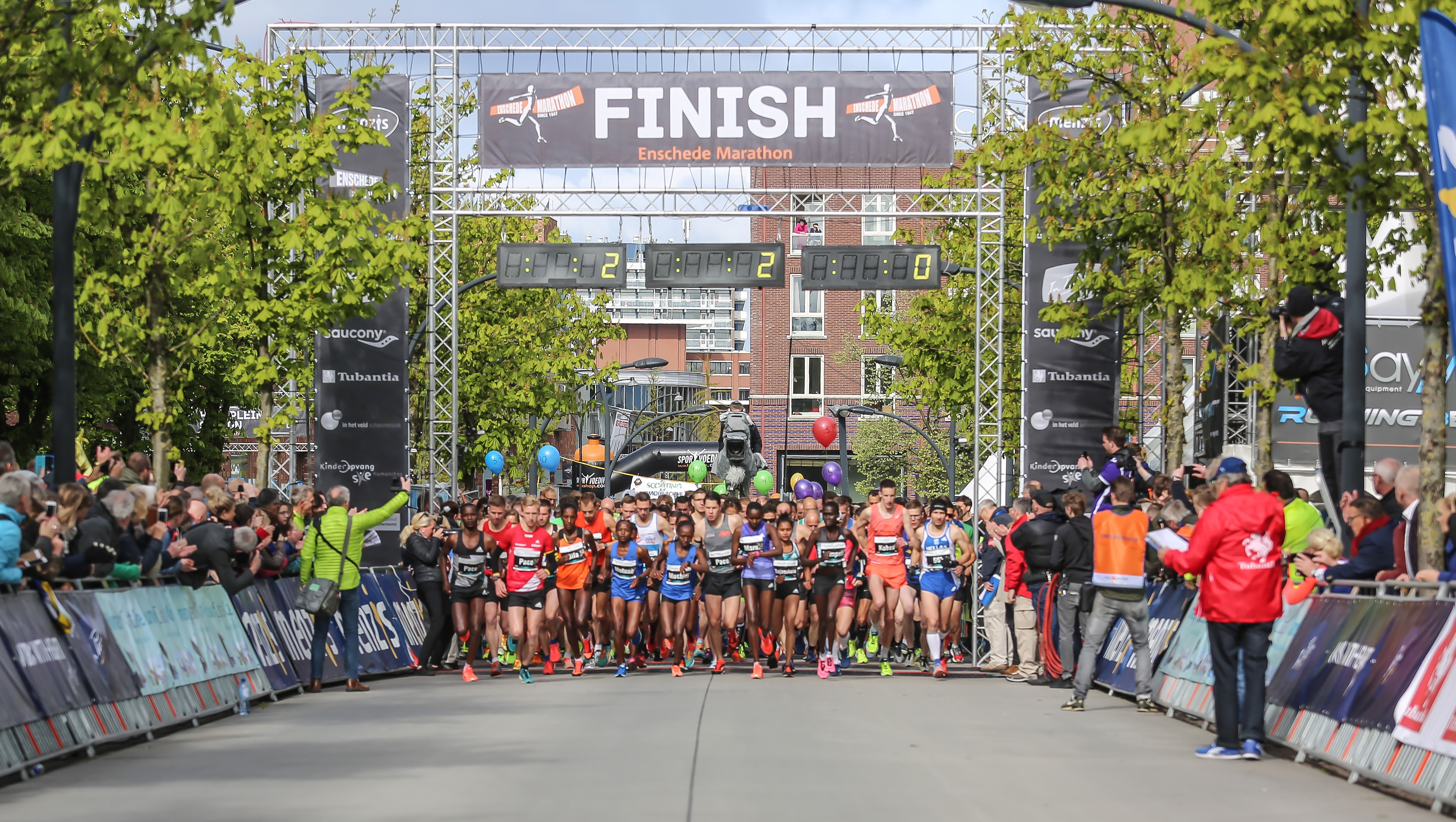
Enschede Marathon

Enschede built the second indoor speed skating arena in the country, IJsbaan Twente.

== Twin towns ==
Enschede is twinned with:

- Dalian, People's Republic of China, since 2009
- Münster, Germany, since 2021
- Palo Alto, California, United States, since 1980

== Notable people ==
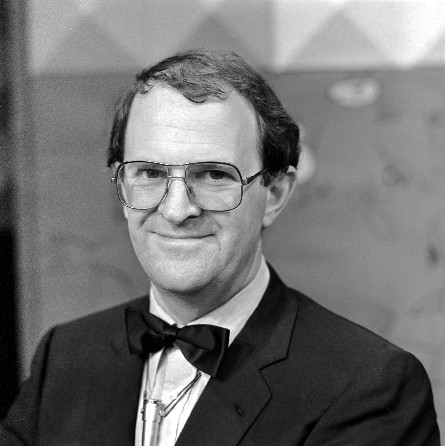
Harry Bannink, 1978

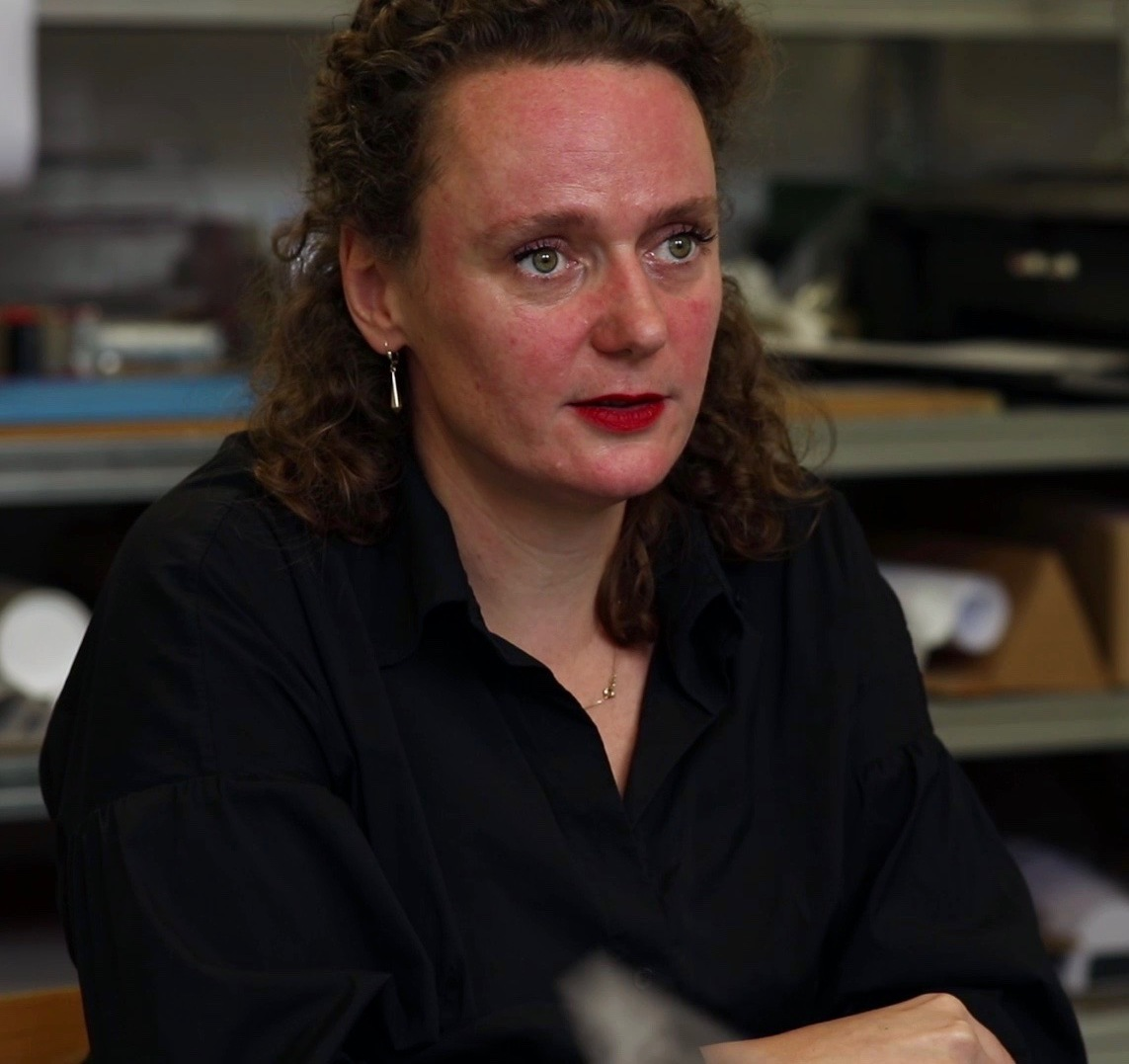
Hansje van Halem, 2018

See also People from Enschede

=== Arts ===
- Aleida Leurink (1682–1755) Dutch writer
- Édouard Niermans (1859–1928) French architect during the Belle Époque
- Marilyn Mills (1903–1956) Dutch-born American film actress of the silent era
- Kees van Baaren (1906–1970) Dutch composer and teacher
- Harry Bannink (1929–1999) Dutch composer, arranger and pianist
- Willem Wilmink (1936–2003) Dutch poet and writer
- Jan Cremer (born 1940) Dutch author, photographer and painter
- Jasper van 't Hof (born 1947) Dutch jazz pianist and keyboard player
- Wilma Landkroon (born 1957) Dutch pop singer
- Natasja Vermeer (born 1973) Dutch model and actress
- Hansje van Halem (born 1978) Dutch graphic designer and type designer
- Marleen Sleeuwits (born 1980) Dutch photographer and installation artist
- Bracha van Doesburgh (born 1981) Dutch actress
- Christiaan Kuyvenhoven (born 1985) Dutch classical pianist

=== Public thinking & public service ===
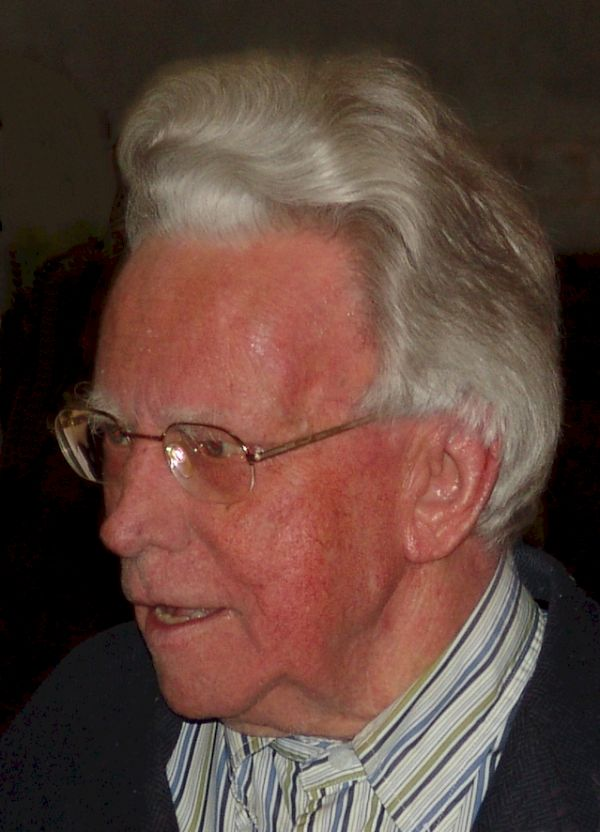
Heiko "Ko" Wierenga, 2007

- Maurice Frankenhuis (1894–1969) Dutch Jewish businessman, historian, researcher, author, Holocaust survivor and philanthropist; lived in Enschede pre-WW1
- Ankie Stork (ca.1922 – 2015) Dutch resistance fighter during the WWII German occupation
- Kees Boertien (1927–2002) Dutch politician and jurist
- Heiko Wierenga (1933–2013) Dutch politician and Mayor of Enschede 1977 to 1994
- Jan Mans (born 1940) Dutch politician, Mayor of Enschede 1994 to 2005
- Bert Doorn (born 1949) Dutch politician and Member of the European Parliament
- Peter den Oudsten (born 1951) Dutch politician, Mayor of Enschede 2005 to 2014
- Tomás Gómez Franco (born 1968) Spanish politician
- Pepijn van Houwelingen (born 1980) Dutch politician (MP)

=== Science & business ===
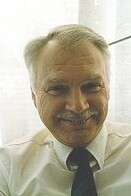
Hans van Abeelen, 1998

- Hans van Abeelen (1936–1998) first Dutch behavioural geneticist
- Henk J. M. Bos (born 1940) Dutch historian of mathematics
- Paul Polman (born 1956) Dutch businessman with Procter & Gamble, Nestlé and Unilever
- Wiebe Draijer (born 1965) Dutch engineer, civil servant and CEO of the Rabobank.
- Maarten J. M. Christenhusz (born 1976) botanist, natural historian and photographer
- Uğur Üngör (born 1980) academic and scholar of genocide and mass violence, raised in Enschede

=== Sports ===
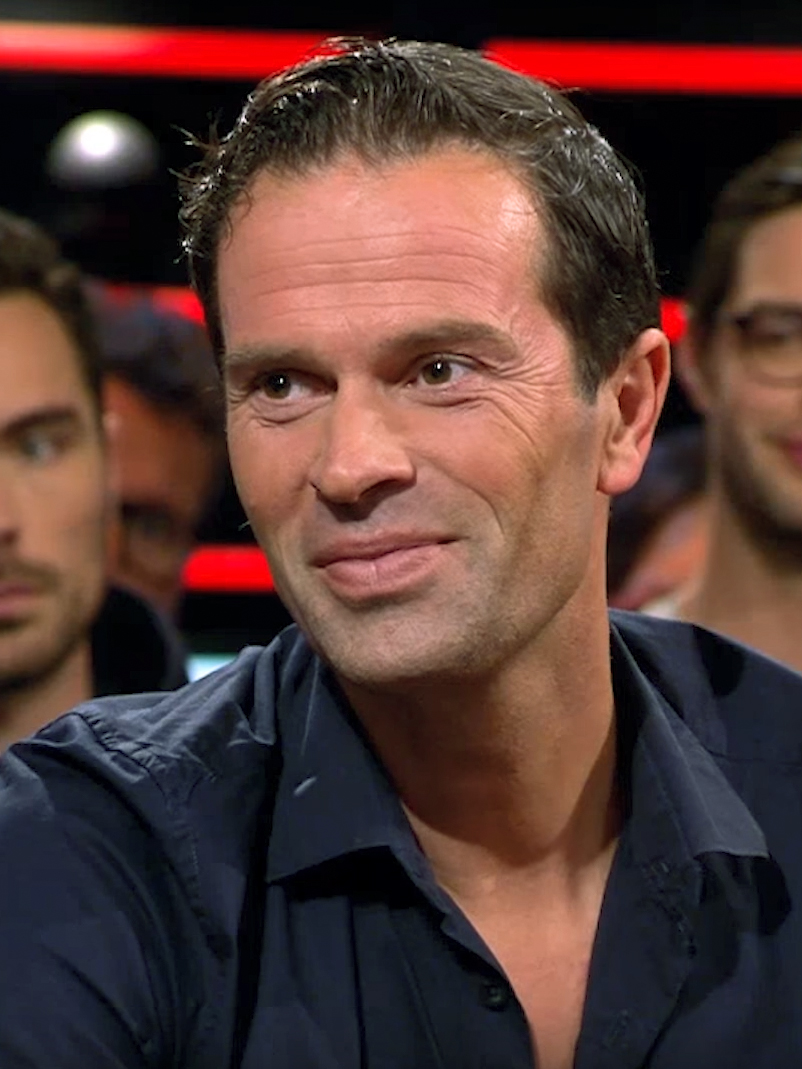
Bas Nijhuis, 2017

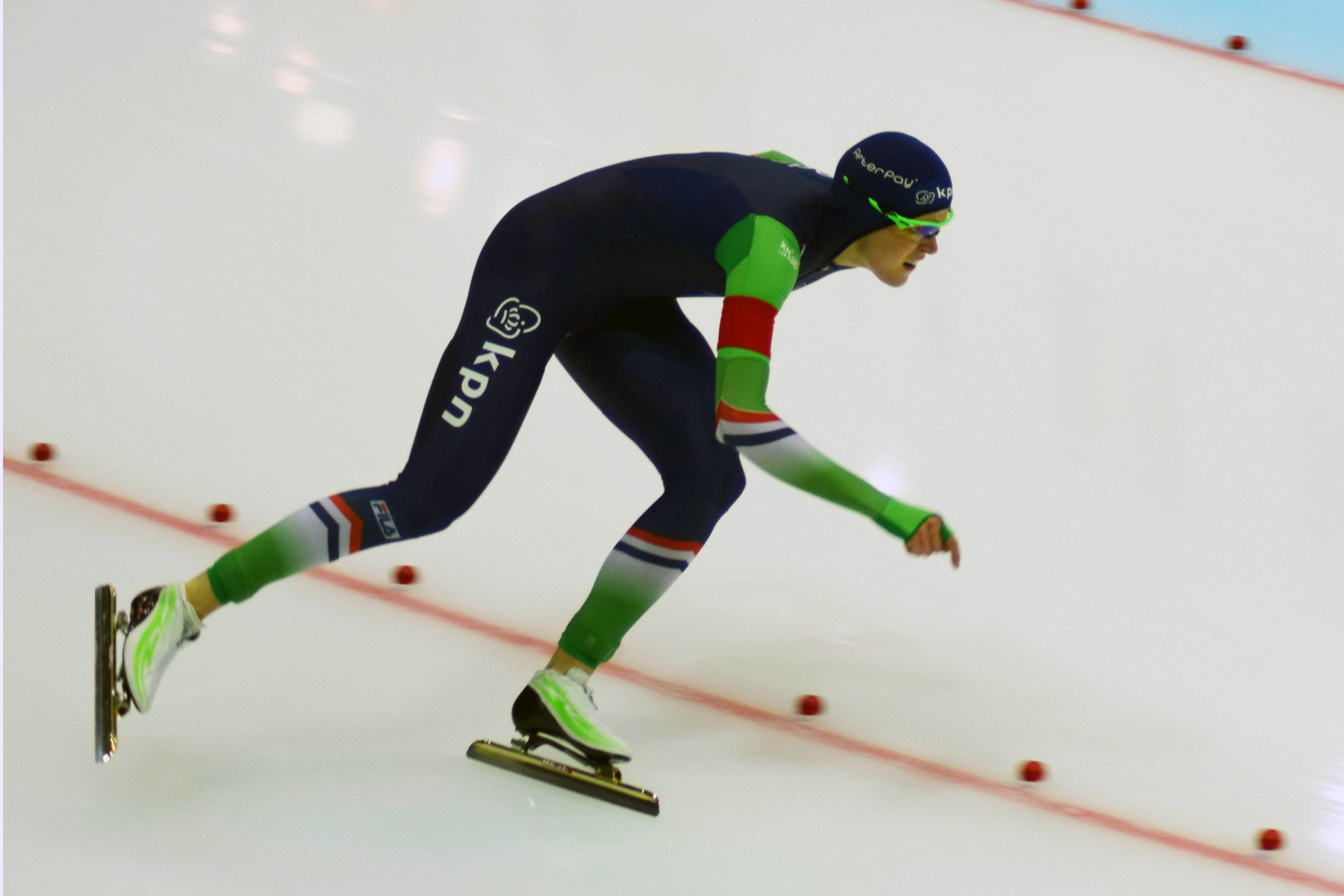
Jorien ter Mors, 2016

- Hans Schnitger (1915–2013) field hockey player, competed in the 1936 Summer Olympics
- Paul Hoekstra (born 1944) Dutch-born, Belgian retired sprint canoeist, silver medalist at the 1964 Summer Olympics
- Jan Jeuring (born 1947) Dutch former professional footballer, 326 appearances for FC Twente
- Johan Reekers (born 1957) Dutch eight time paralympian
- Henk-Jan Zwolle (born 1964) former rower, team bronze and gold medalist at the 1992 and 1996 Summer Olympics
- Dorien de Vries (born 1965) sailor, bronze medalist at the 1992 Summer Olympics
- Noor Holsboer (born 1967) field hockey defender, team bronze medalist at the 1988 and 1996 Summer Olympics
- Kirsten Gleis (born 1969) retired volleyball player, played 241 matches for the NL
- Sander Westerveld (born 1974) former professional football goalkeeper with 440 club appearances
- Jeroen Heubach (born 1974) former football player with over 320 club appearances
- Bas Nijhuis (born 1977) Dutch football FIFA referee and full-time baker
- Ruud ter Heide (born 1982) former professional football striker with 313 club appearances, and a convicted killer
- Rianne Guichelaar (born 1983) water polo player, team gold medalist at the 2008 Summer Olympics
- Karim El Ahmadi (born 1985) Moroccan professional footballer with almost 400 club appearances
- Jorien ter Mors (born 1989) Dutch short and long track speed skater; gold medalist at the 2014 and 2018 Winter Olympics
- Mitch Stockentree (born 1991) former professional footballer
- Larry ten Voorde (born 1996) Dutch racing driver and two-time champion of the Porsche Supercup

== Literature ==
- Alfred Hagemann/Elmar Hoff (Hg.): Insel der Träume. Musik in Gronau und Enschede (1895–2005), Klartext-Verlag, Essen 2006.
