= Remmer =

Remmer is a surname. Notable people with the surname include:

- Anders Remmer, Danish electronic musician
- Christoffer Remmer (born 1993), Danish association footballer
- Hans Remmer (1920–1944), Luftwaffe pilot
- Karen Remmer, American political scientist

== See also ==
- Remmers
