= Heike Wermer =

German politician

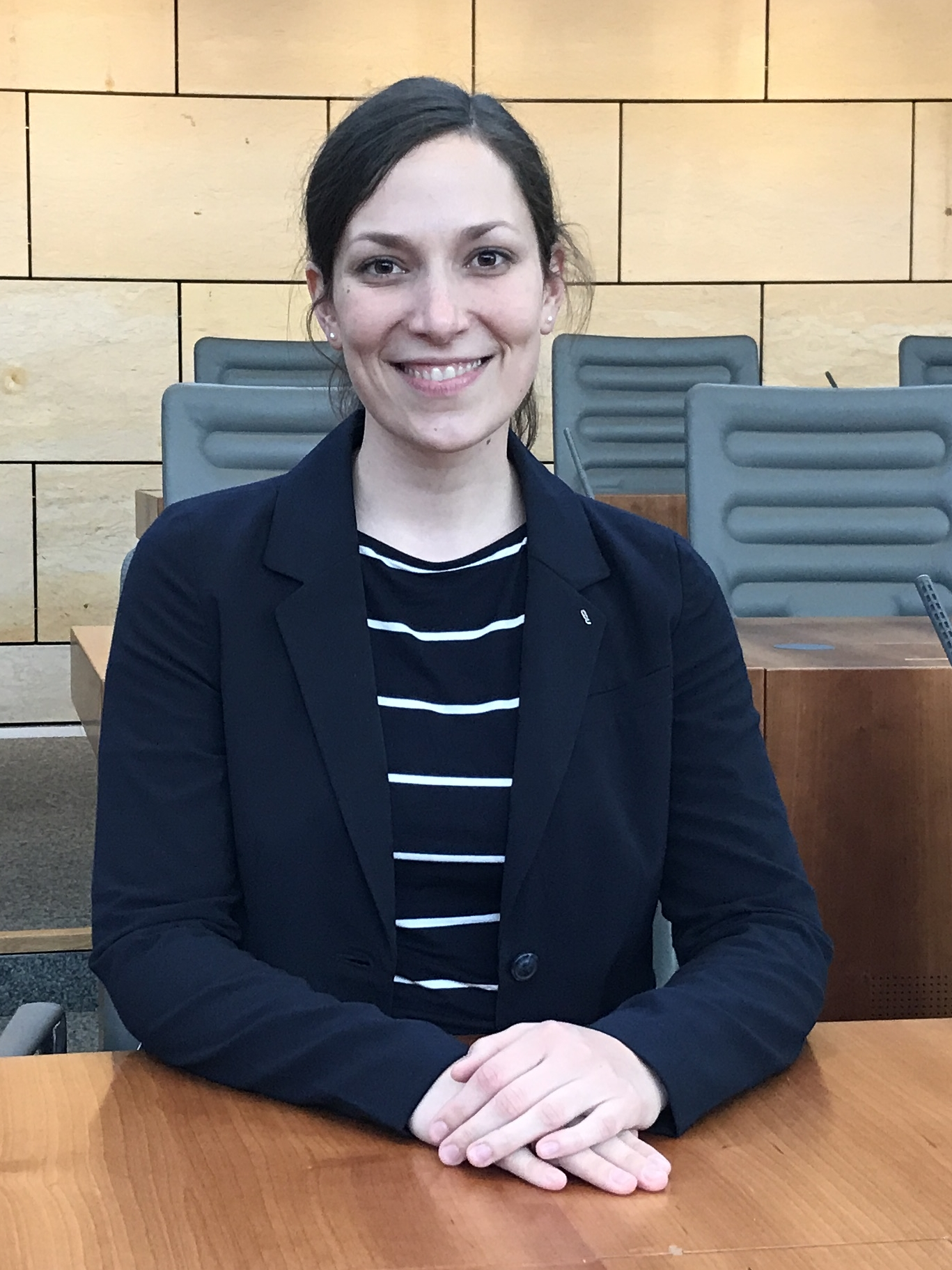
- Bernard in 2017

Member of Landtag of North Rhine-Westphalia for Borken II
- Incumbent
- Assumed office 2017
- Preceded by: Bernhard Tenhumberg

Personal details
- Born: May 5, 1988 (age 38) Ahaus
- Party: Christian Democratic Union of Germany

Heike Wermer (born 5 May 1988) is a German politician for the Christian Democratic Union of Germany (CDU) and, since 2017, a member of the Landtag of North Rhine-Westphalia, the diet of the largest German federal state.

== Life and politics ==
Wermer was born 1988 and entered the CDU in 2011. Since 2017 she has been a member of the Landtag of North Rhine-Westpahlia.
