= Boekelo =

- Village
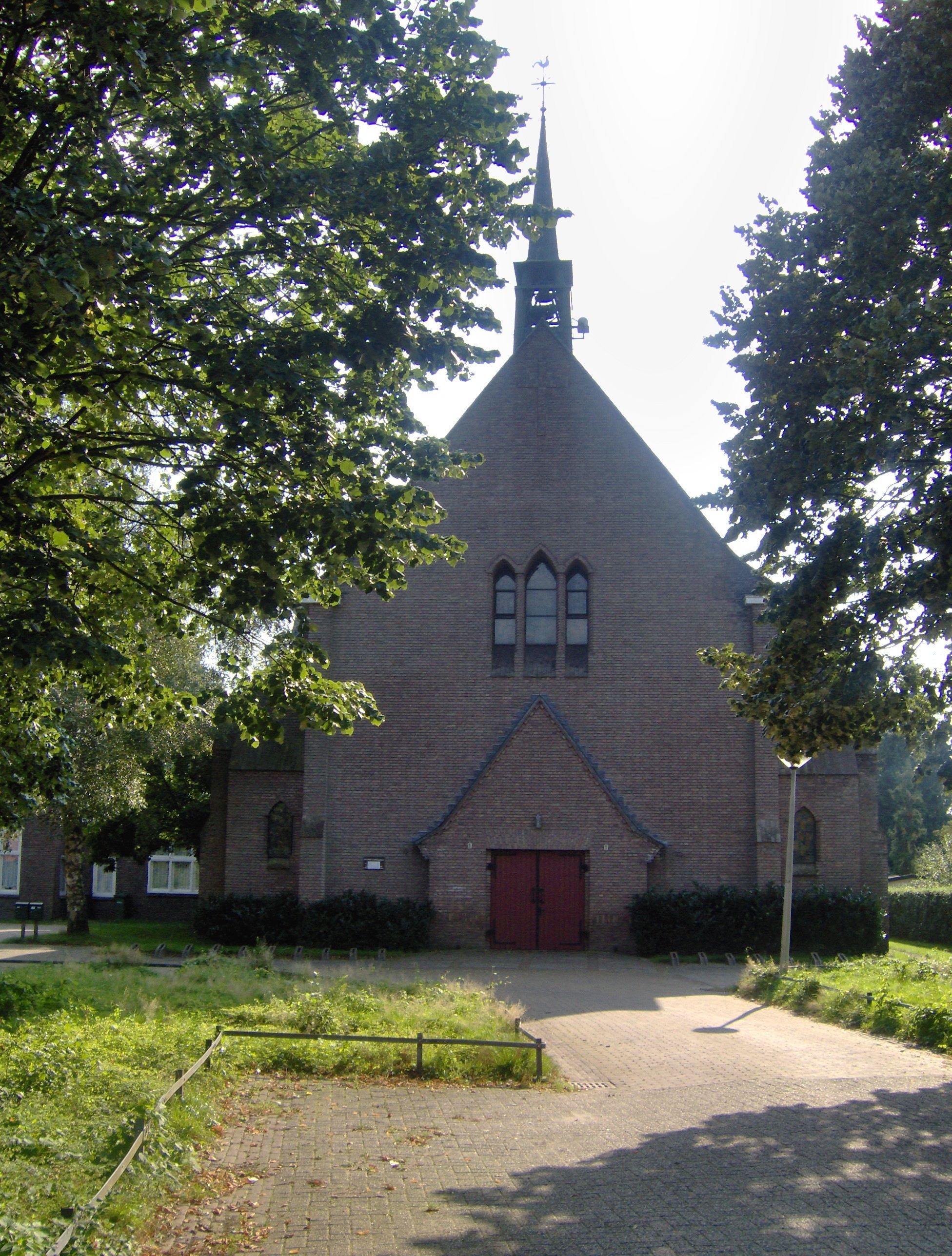
- The Saint Marcellinus Church in Boekelo

- Flag
- Nickname: Zoaltkloetns
- Location in the Netherlands Boekelo (Netherlands)
- Coordinates: 52°12′16″N 6°48′7″E
- Country: Netherlands
- Province: Overijssel
- Municipality: Enschede

Area
  - Total: 1.68 km^{2} (0.65 sq mi)
- Elevation: 26 m (85 ft)

Population (2021)
  - Total: 2,595
  - Density: 1,540/km^{2} (4,000/sq mi)
- Time zone: UTC+1 (CET)
  - Summer (DST): UTC+2 (CEST)
- Postal code: 7548
- Dialing code: 053

Boekelo (Dutch pronunciation: [ˈbukəloː]) is a village in the municipality of Enschede in the eastern Netherlands, the population is estimated at 2,500. It is located just west of Usselo. The village is known for the Military Boekelo Enschede, an international equestrian event. It is also known for the salt industry, since 1919 located south of the village. This was a reason for the then well-known Bad Boekelo (Bath Boekelo) to have a salt water wave pool. After the opening of the Twentekanaal (Twente canal) the factory of the Koninklijke Nederlandse Zoutindustrie (Royal Dutch Salt-industry) was moved to Hengelo; currently it is called Nouryon Industrial Chemicals.

Textile industry flourished in Boekelo: The N.V. Boekelosche Stoombleekerij (public LLC Boekelo's Steam-bleachery), founded in 1888 by Gerrit Jan van Heek, was taken over by Unilever (who fused it with P. Fenter van Vlissingen & Co's Katoenfabrieken N.V.). On the former factory's terrain, a new quarter called De Bleekerij (The Bleachery) was built. Parts of the old industrial heritage such as old facades and the factory's chimney were integrated into the new buildings. The internationally known beer brewery Grolsch moved to Boekelo, abandoning its factories in Groenlo and Enschede. The Museum Buurtspoorweg (lit. Museum Neighborhood-railway) runs a historical museum railway with restored steam locomotives and wagons between Boekelo and Haaksbergen.

== Geography ==
The village layout clearly shows the now abandoned verzuiling of the Dutch society. The village consists of two population centers, one in the east (Protestant) and one in the west (Catholic). The two parts of the village are separated by the "Boekelerbeek" (Boekelo's stream) and some fields. Originally the parts each had their own church, elementary school, barber, grocery store and pub. The only factories were in the eastern part.

When the verzuiling disappeared, the shops gradually lost their distinct Catholic or Protestant clientele. In time, the catholic elementary school moved to the east part, the west grocery store closed and the west pub became a liquor store. New stores opened and new houses were built in the east part. At present the east part is considered the center of the village, it covers an area approximately ten times as large as the western part.

In Twente's bocage lie historical estates, among others Hof te Boekelo (an original manor house from 1570), De Weele, Zonnebeek en 't Stroot.

== Gallery ==
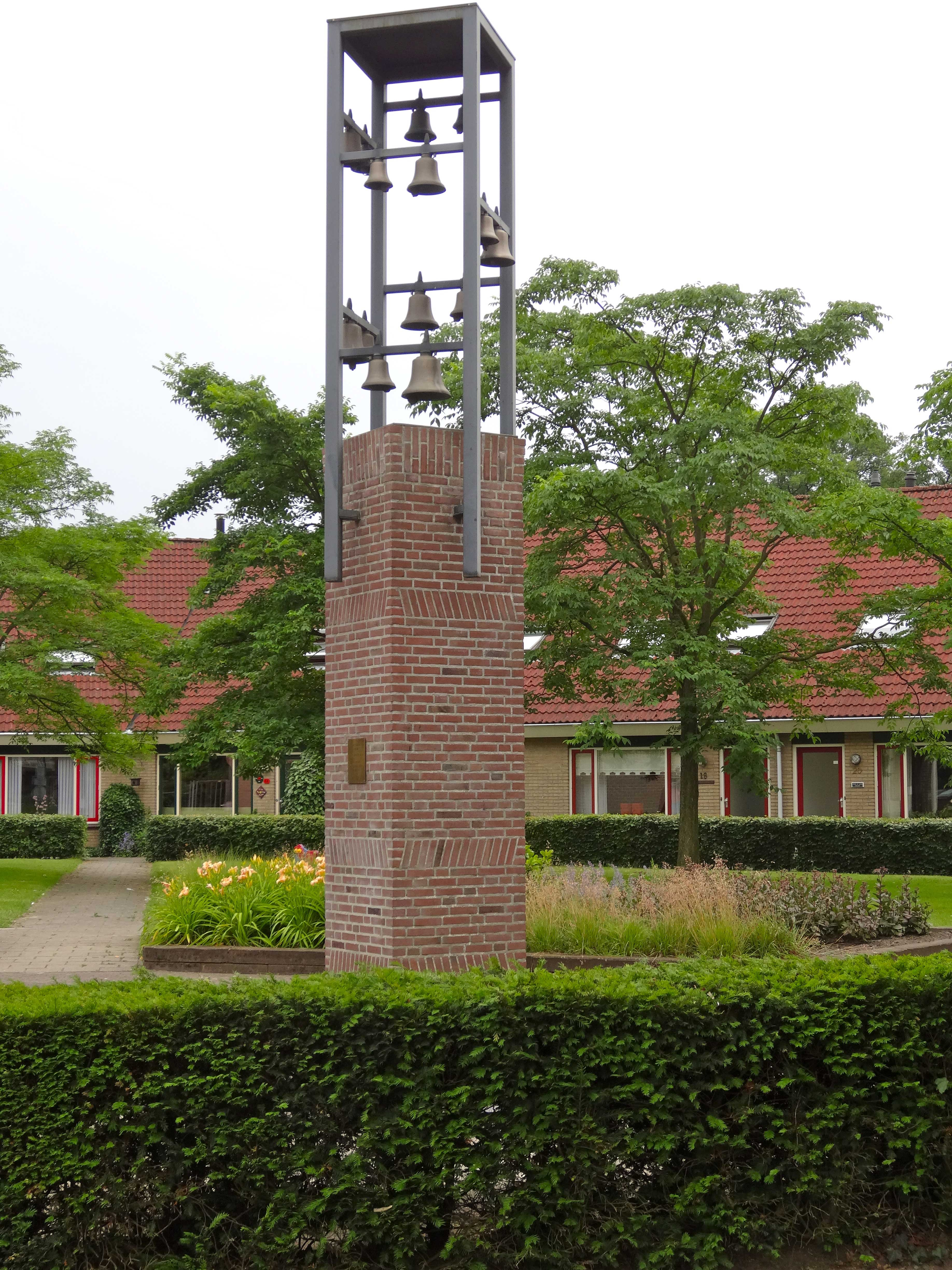
Carillon of Boekelo

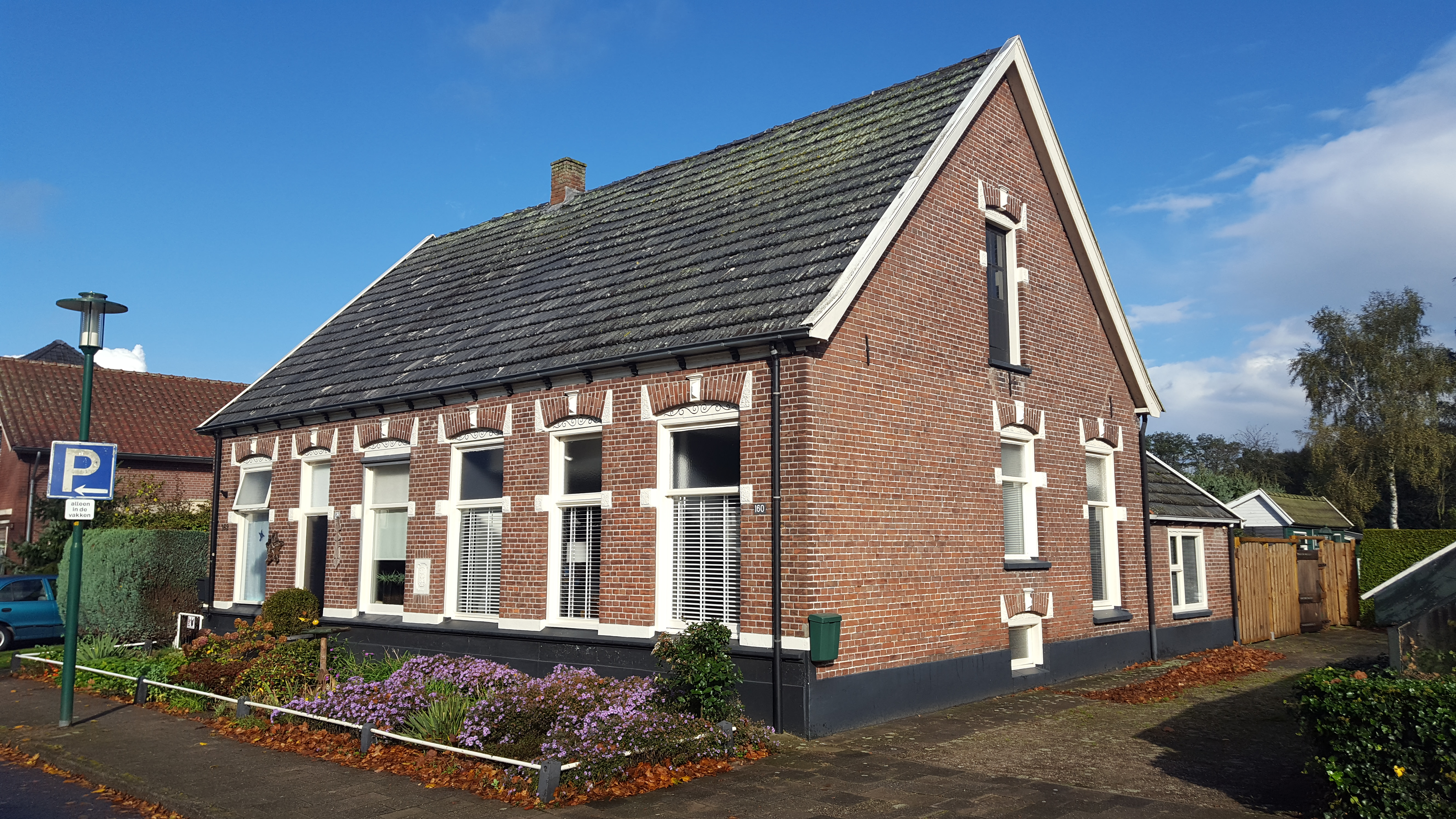
House in Boekelo

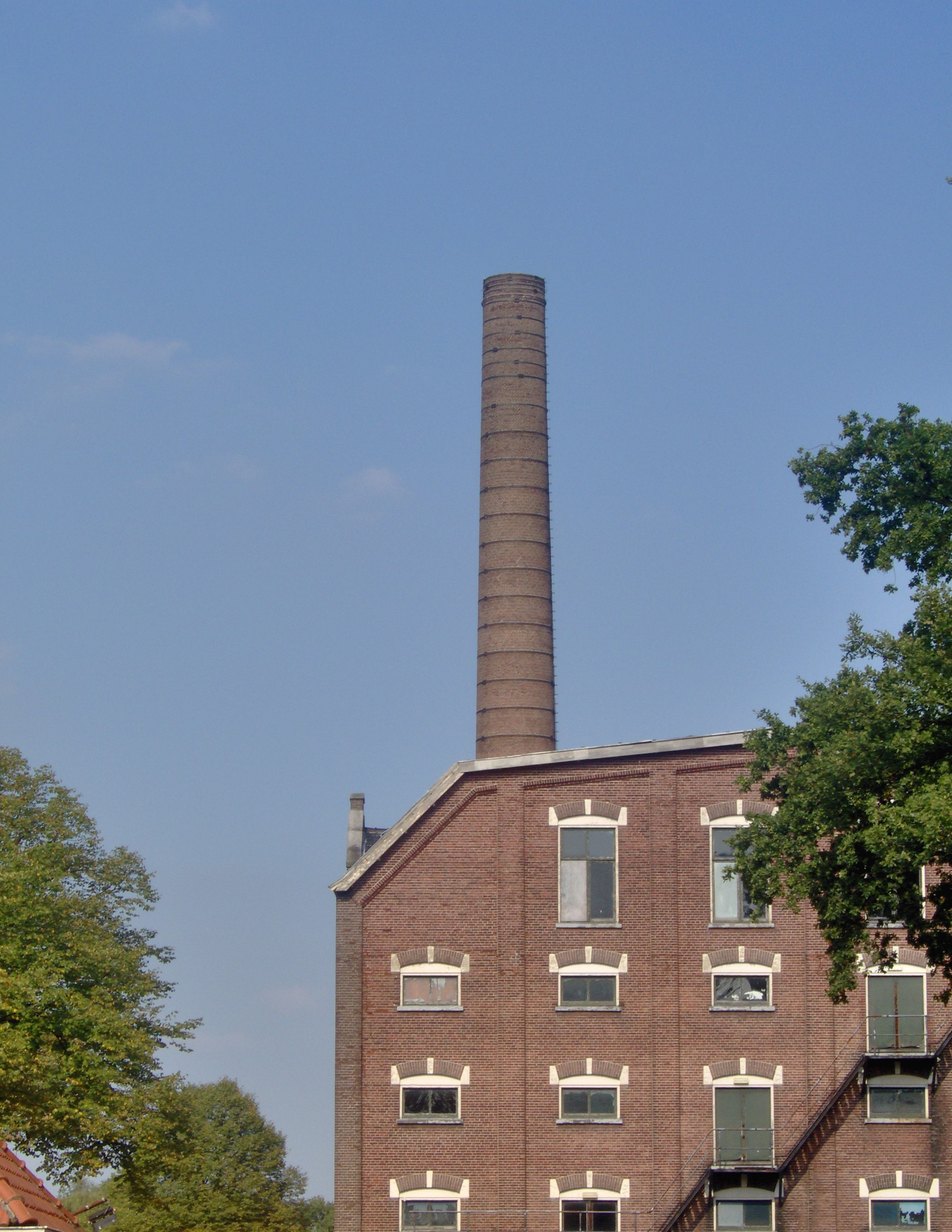
Factory in Boekelo

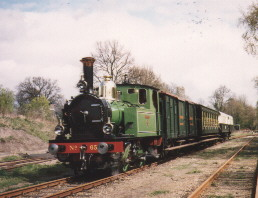
Train arriving in Boekelo

== Bibliography ==
- Stuiver, Bart Tovenaars met Textiel: Boekelosche Stoombleekerij 1888-1965 (Wizards with textile: Boekelo Steam bleaching factory) published by "Stichting historische kring Boekelo, Usselo, Twekkelo" (Historical club Boekelo, Usselo, Twekkelo, foundation), 2011
