= Twekkelo =

- Hamlet
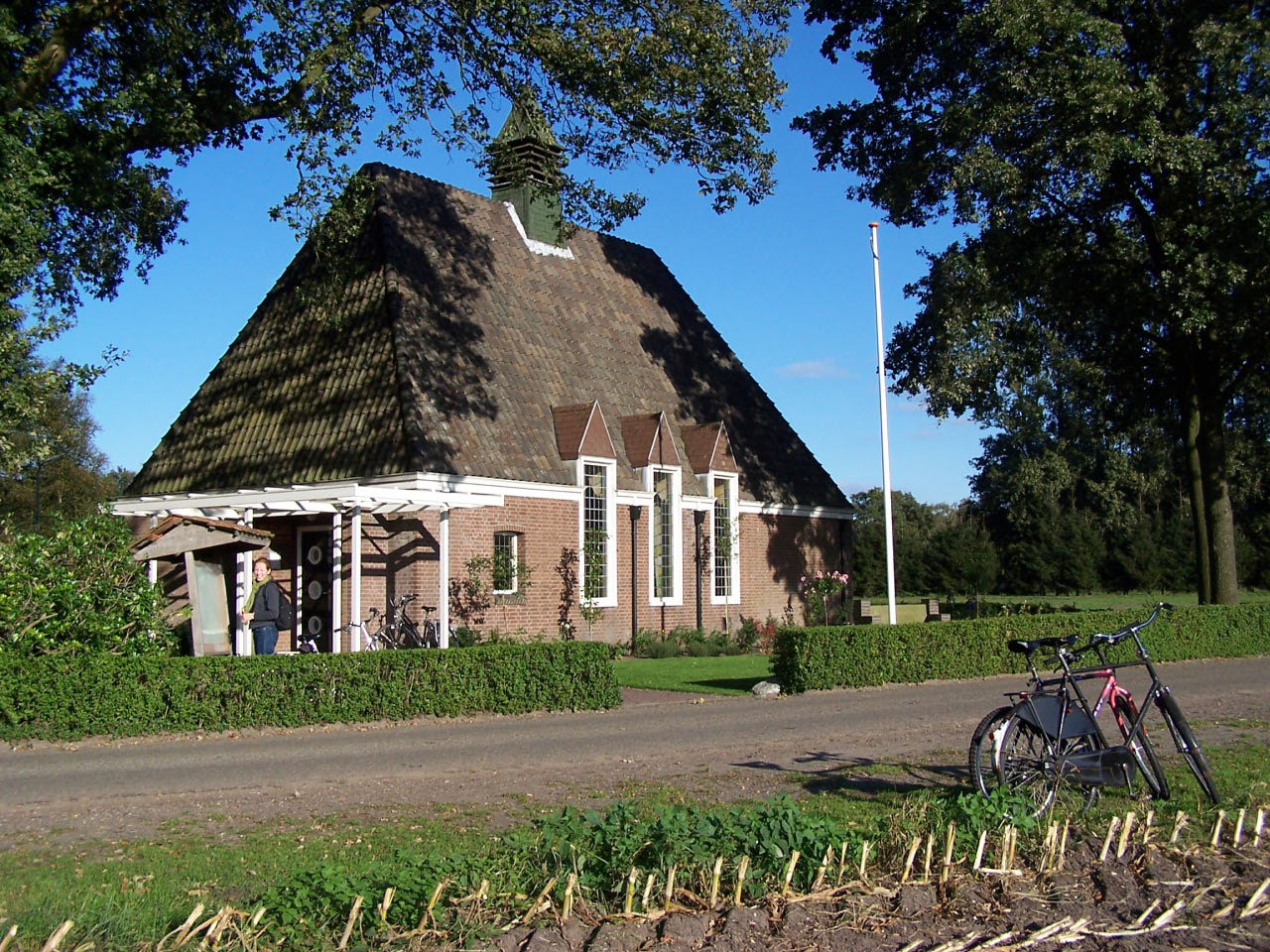
- The Johanneskerk is a very small church

- Location in the Netherlands Twekkelo (Netherlands)
- Coordinates: 52°14′N 6°49′E
- Country: Netherlands
- Province: Overijssel
- Municipality: Enschede

Area
  - Total: 6.55 km^{2} (2.53 sq mi)
- Elevation: 31 m (102 ft)

Population (2021)
  - Total: 195
  - Density: 29.8/km^{2} (77.1/sq mi)
- Time zone: UTC+1 (CET)
  - Summer (DST): UTC+2 (CEST)
- Postal code: 7547
- Dialing code: 053

Twekkelo is a hamlet in Twente, in the province of Overijssel. It is located between Enschede and Hengelo. It had 240 registered inhabitants in 2008.

Until 1934, it fell, for administrative purposes, within the ambit of Lonneker, but, in that year, Lonneker was abolished for administrative purposes, and both are now administered as districts of Enschede.

== History ==
Twekkelo was traditionally included in the parish of Enschede, along with Lonneker, Driene, Usselo and De Eschmarke. From approximately the year 900, a record survives naming the place as Tuegloe. Twekkelo itself was divided into districts identified as the Gerinkhoek, the Beldershoek, the Wullenhoek, the Rougoor, the Mensinkhoek, the Twekkeler field and the Great field.

== Salt ==
In 1919, AkzoNobel established a salt extraction facility at Twekkelo, but this is no longer operational.

== Geography ==
The heart of Twekkelo is three closely positioned pieces of arable pasture, surrounded by a number of farmsteads, one or two of which were already mentioned in ninth and tenth century records. A register compiled in 1475 estimates that there were by then 23 of these farmsteads.

Three streams, the Makkenbroekenbeek (Twekkelerbeek), the Strootsbeek (later Elsbeek) and the Schoolbeek flow from east to west through Twekkelo. The last two of these actually originate in Twekkelo. The water in parts of the streams is exceptionally clear.

The area is now bordered by the industrial areas of Enschede and Hengelo and, to the north, by the Twentekanaal. The A35 highway runs along the southern edge of Twekkelo. Twekkelo contains numerous traditional and historical buildings.

The Twekkelo Preservation Union ("Vereniging Behoud Twekkelo") was formed in 1991 in response to the threat of urbanisation and industrial incursions. A number of walking trails have been established and steps have been taken to make the rural charms of the place better known to outsiders.

== Johanneskerk (Church of St. John) ==
The little Johanneskerk was built in 1950 by the "Armenstaat Twekkelo", an organisation set up to serve poor and materially disadvantaged local members of the Dutch Reformed Church. Since 1998, it has been possible to use the church for civil marriages.
