= A Hidden Life (memoir) =

2008 memoir by Johanna Reiss

- Author: Johanna Reiss
- Language: English
- Subject: Holocaust
- Set in: The Netherlands, 1969
- Publisher: Melville House Publishing
- Publication date: 1 October 2008
- Media type: Print
- Pages: 250
- ISBN: 978-1933633558

A Hidden Life is a memoir by Dutch-American author Johanna Reiss. Reiss won the Newbery Medal for her account of her experiences as a child during the Holocaust, The Upstairs Room, which was followed by the sequel The Journey Back, both published by HarperCollins.

== Background ==
In A Hidden Life, Reiss recounts her visit to the home of her youth and the tragedy that followed. She had been 10 years old at the beginning of World War II, and spent nearly three years hiding from the Nazis with a family in Usselo in a rural part of the Netherlands. In the postwar period, she immigrated to the United States. After living there for several years, she decided to visit the family that aided her during the harrowing Nazi years. She made this journey in the summer of 1969, spending nearly two months in the Netherlands with her husband and her two young children. While there, she had to confront her painful memories. But during that time, a worse and more immediate tragedy befell her: her husband returned to America early and committed suicide. A Hidden Life, which Lucy Kavaler calls "one of the most moving books" she has ever read, is the story of one woman's perseverance through past and present tragedy.
