= A Hidden Life =

A Hidden Life may refer to:

- A Hidden Life (memoir),by Johanna Reiss
- A Hidden Life (2001 film), a Brazilian drama film
- A Hidden Life (2019 film), a historical drama film directed by Terrence Malick
- A Hidden Life: The Enigma of Sir Edmund Backhouse, later published as Hermit of Peking: The Hidden Life of Sir Edmund Backhouse, a book by Hugh Trevor-Roper
