= Twente =

Region of the Netherlands

Coordinates: 52°19′18″N 6°46′13″E

- Flag

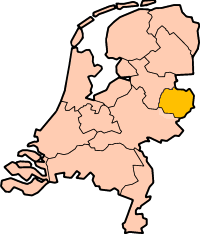
- Location of Twente (yellow) as if it were the 13th province of the Netherlands
- Capital: Enschede (de facto)
- Official languages: Dutch; Low Saxon
- Ethnic groups: Predominantly European

Area
  - Total: 1,504 km^{2} (581 sq mi)
  - Water (%): 1.06%

Population
  - 2012 estimate: 626,586
  - Density: 421.6/km^{2} (1,091.9/sq mi)

Twente (Dutch: Twente [ˈtʋɛntə], Tweants dialect: Tweante) is a region in the eastern Netherlands. It encompasses the most urbanised and easternmost part of the province of Overijssel. Twente is most likely named after the Tuihanti or Tvihanti, a Germanic tribe that settled in the area and was mentioned by the Roman historian Tacitus. The region's borders are defined by the Overijssel region of Salland in the northwest and west (the river Regge roughly defines the western border), the German County of Bentheim in the northeast and east (the river Dinkel roughly defines the eastern border) and the Gelderland region of the Achterhoek in the south.

Twente has approximately 620,000 inhabitants, most of whom live in its three largest cities: Almelo, Hengelo and Enschede, the latter being the main city of the region. It comprises fourteen municipalities: Almelo, Borne, Dinkelland, Enschede, Haaksbergen, Hellendoorn, Hengelo, Hof van Twente, Losser, Oldenzaal, Rijssen-Holten, Tubbergen, Twenterand and Wierden. The whole of Hellendoorn and the western parts of both Rijssen-Holten and Twenterand historically belong to the cultural region of Salland, but to the city region of Twente.

== Etymology ==
Various sources provide several explanations of the name Twente. In his work Germania, the Roman historian Tacitus mentions a tribe called Tvihanti, who lived near or in present-day Twente. This same name was found on two altar stones found in the ruins of Vercovicium, a Roman guard post on Hadrian's Wall near present-day Housesteads in Northern England. The Tvihanti served in a Roman-Frisian cavalry unit that was stationed there.

Another explanation of the origins of the name is that Twente was part of the Oversticht, a medieval administrative construction which included the adjacent shires of Twente and Drenthe. As the name Drenthe is said to stem from *þrija-hantja meaning "three lands", Twente is said to stem from *twai-hantja or "two lands".

== Landscape ==
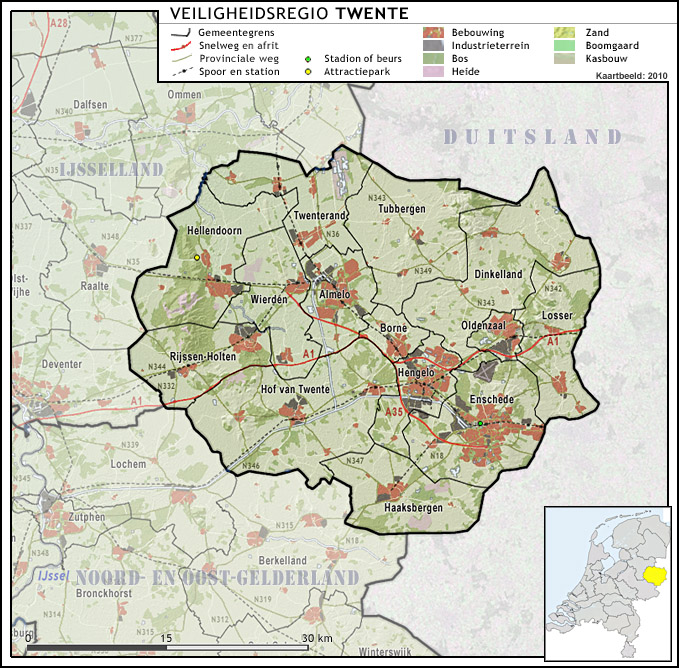
Municipalities of the city region of Twente

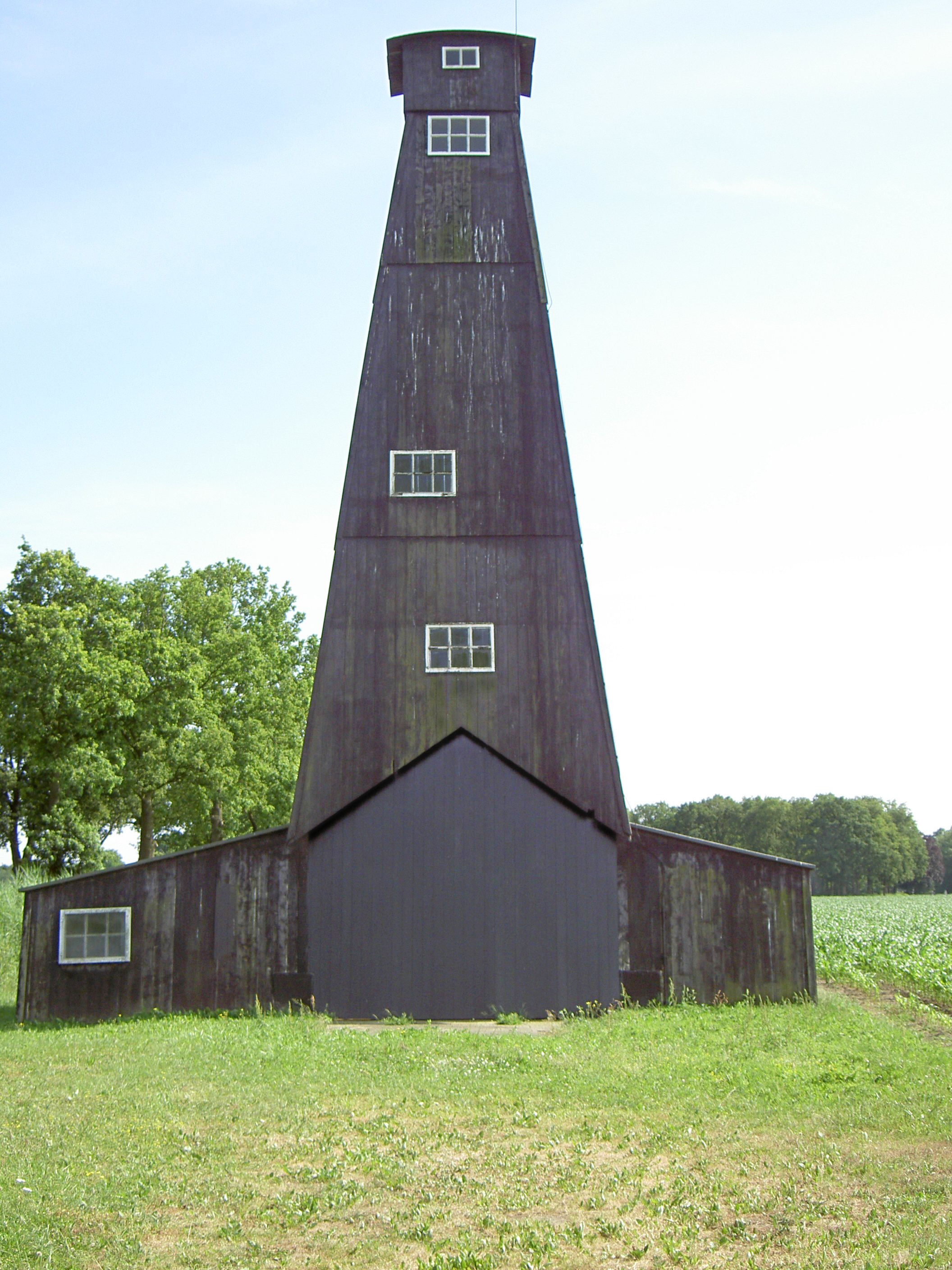
Tower for salt-mining, near Twekkelo

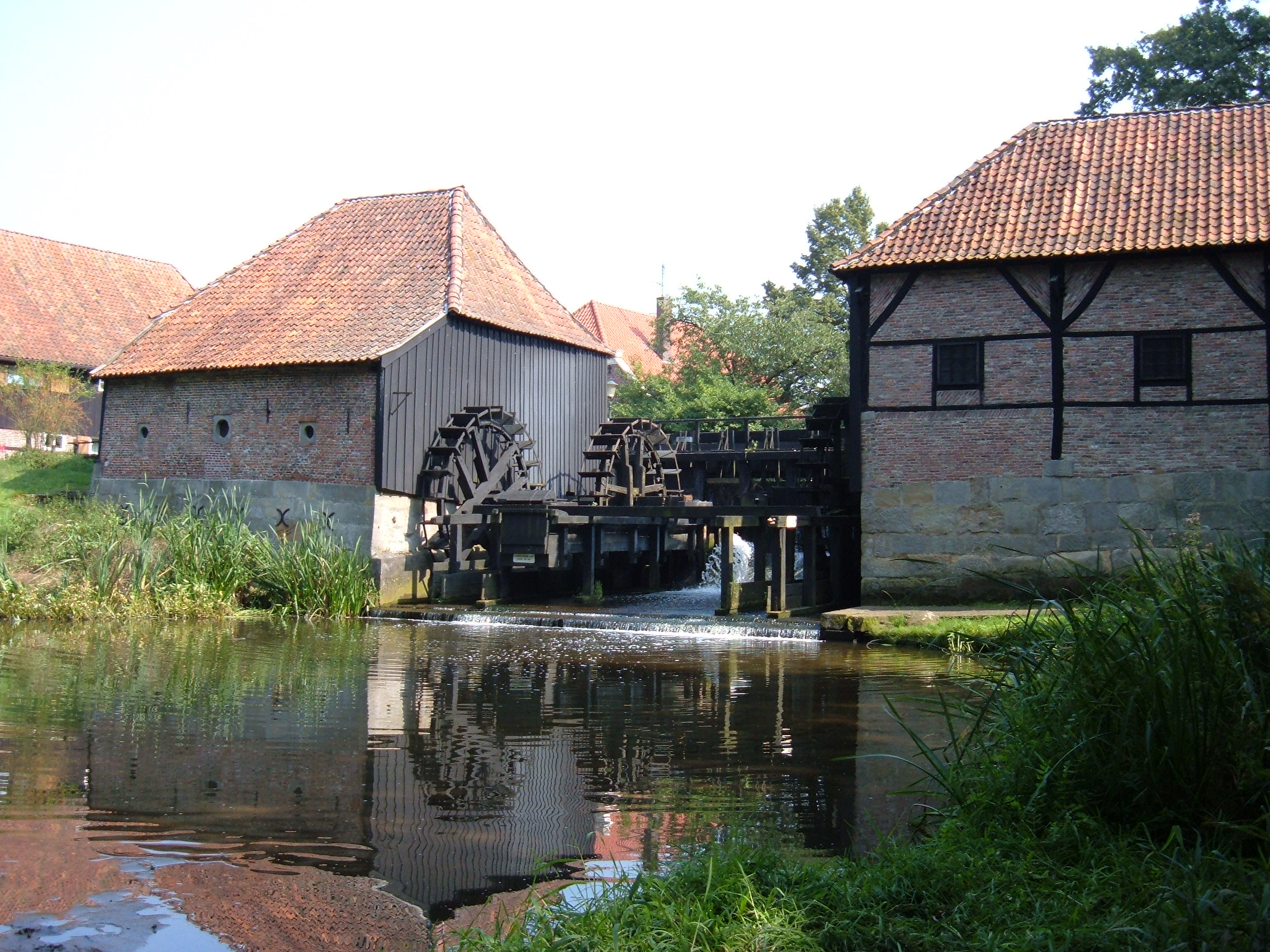
Oostendorpermolen, near Haaksbergen

Although Twente is the most urbanized part of the province of Overijssel, it is renowned for its scenic countryside. This is sometimes characterized as a bocage landscape, attracting many tourists from other parts of the country, with popular sights such as the Lutterzand on the meandering Dinkel, or the wide heather fields on the Frezenbaarg near Markelo. Twente is bisected from north to south by a range of hills in western Twente (Holterberg, Rijsserberg, Friezenberg, Nijverdalse Berg, Hellendoornse Berg), and hills in the east, with the Tankenberg near Oldenzaal being the highest point. The towns of Ootmarsum, and Oldenzaal to a lesser extent, are known for their scenic historical buildings, the latter of which has a noteworthy Romanesque church called Oale Grieze (the ‘Old Grey’), which is the oldest Romanesque church in the Netherlands. Eight Twents towns have obtained city rights: Almelo, Delden, Diepenheim, Enschede, Goor, Oldenzaal, Ootmarsum, and Rijssen.

Since Twente's economy is to a great extent reliant on agriculture, this leaves its marks on the landscape, with many meadows and pastures, alternating with undergrowth, scrubs and copse. There are several fens, marshes and peat bogs, which long made Twente less accessible for the rest of the Netherlands, and which formed some natural defence. It also made the inhabitants of Twente incline towards the east (Westphalia and Münster, more precisely) in trade, politics and fashion, rather than to the more western parts of the Netherlands.

Geologically, Twente is one of the most interesting areas of the Netherlands. It has strata (earth layers) from various eras concentrated in a relatively small area. There is an open stone quarry at Losser, while there are several salt mines at Hengelo and Boekelo. The western Twente town of Nijverdal is the only place in the Netherlands where gold was ever found.

== Economy ==
Twente is largely reliant on agriculture, next to services, and to a lesser degree tourism. The improved national image of Twente has stimulated an increase in sales of regional products. One of the largest Dutch beer breweries, the Grolsch Brewery, is in Twente. In recent years, Twente is increasingly marketed as a high-tech region. The University of Twente drives the creation of spin-offs and startups, and seeks close collaboration with the defence industry. It is a considerable force in the Netherlands' position within the global photonics sector. Major companies include Demcon and Thales Nederland.

Twente has many construction companies, most notably in the town of Rijssen, which houses over twenty companies in construction and related services, such as electricity, plumbing, and insulation. Some north-western Twents villages, such as Westerhaar-Vriezenveensewijk, are known for their many inhabitants employed in road engineering. Some construction companies have set up or invested in offices overseas, such as in the US and Asia.

Twente also has many machine manufacturing companies, like machinery for agriculture, oil piping, food manufacturing, assembly automation, etc. Many of them with a global customer base.

Next to aforementioned occupations, many Twents people are engaged in the transport sector. The second half of the twentieth century saw an explosive increase in the number of freight transportation companies.

== Culture and folklore ==
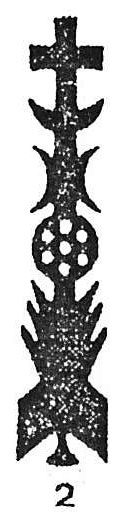
Twents gevelteken

The flag of Twente is a bright red field with a rampant white horse known as a Saxon Steed, which also features in the arms of Westphalia, Lower Saxony, and the English county of Kent.

People in Twente sometimes go by the epithet "Tukker", which most likely refers to the now forgotten profession of fulling, also known as tucking, as many of Twente's inhabitants were involved in the regional textiles industry before it collapsed.

=== Traditions ===
In the more rural parts of Twente, a notion called noaberskop, literally neighbourship, is deemed of great importance. In short, noaberskop involves neighbours looking after each other or giving good counsel whenever a neighbour asks for advice. For instance, it may include collecting each other's mail and watering plants and flowers while the other family is on holiday and looking after each other's pets. Noaberskop is regarded a matter of rights and obligations. A neighbour may for instance call on another neighbour for help if something needs to be repaired or otherwise taken care of, but it is very indecent to refuse if the other neighbour then asks for a favour in return. Neighbours are expected to help each other preparing wedding celebrations, funerals, birthday parties, etc. Though modern social security service has reduced the need for strong noaberskop bonds, some communities do appreciate newcomers adapting to these old customs and "making neighbourship" with the others, and not fulfilling noaberskop duties may be still regarded a grave offence.

A number of traditional cultural practices have been preserved in Twente, such as blowing mid-winter horns around Christmas and burning Easter fires. Twente also has a considerable number of klootsketersverennigings (road bowling associations), which is the local traditional sport.

In the small town of Ootmarsum, a tradition known as vlöggeln is practised annually around Easter. Firstly, a group of eight young bachelors called Poaskearls (Easter Men) are selected. On Easter morning, the Poaskearls form a human chain by joining hands. They go through some of the houses of the town while singing psalms, after which the other inhabitants and other spectators may join the chain. After a while, the chain halts in the town centre, where fathers may lift their young children three times, while shouting "Halleluja". The gathering continues towards the fields, where a large Easter Fire has been built by the community. The gathering sings a psalm and then the Poaskearls light the bonfire. It is commonly believed to be a Roman Catholic adaptation of a pre-Christian fertility tradition.

An extravagant carnival is celebrated in Oldenzaal, which, like the most of eastern Twente has a considerable group of Roman Catholics. The west of Twente is mainly Protestant.

Today, Twente has one of the Netherlands’ largest exile communities of Assyrians.

=== Food ===
Although Twente has always been part of larger cultural areas, borrowing and adopting food traditions, there are a number of traditional "typically Twents" dishes and snacks. One of the nationally most-renowned foods from Twente is the kreantewegge. This is a type of currant bread, that is traditionally baked to celebrate the birth of children. The kreantewegge was usually a long loaf, sometimes extending over as much as one meter, cut into thick slices. It is currently still a popular accompaniment with a cup of coffee, though it is no longer exclusively linked to child birth.

Another typically Twents food is bakleaverworst (roughly translated as baked liver sausage), mostly abbreviated to bakworst. This is a spicy pork sausage, usually approximately 15 cm in diameter. The sausage is cut into 1 cm slices and baked. It is not usually served for dinner, but is often eaten for lunch, on a sandwich. It is mainly a seasonal product; as it is a hot and hearty snack, it is only available during the winters.

There are several dishes that are often termed "typically Twents", although they are not much served today. Examples include stip in de pan and balkenbriej.

Perhaps the best internationally known beverage from Twente is Grolsch lager. Though it is originally from the town of Groenlo which is in the adjacent Achterhoek region, the brewery moved to Boekelo near Enschede. It is therefore currently often considered a Twents brand. A relatively new brand of lager, Twents Bier, is brewed in the town of Beckum. Twente also has a longstanding tradition of distilling bitters. There are many locally distilled bitters, which are often produced and consumed for special occasions and celebrations. Often, they aren't for sale outside the home village.

Though Twents families traditionally ate potatoes, vegetables and meat for dinner, the influx of many immigrants from all over the world to Twente, who brought with them their own food traditions, has broadened the average Twenteman's nutritional horizon.

=== Architecture ===
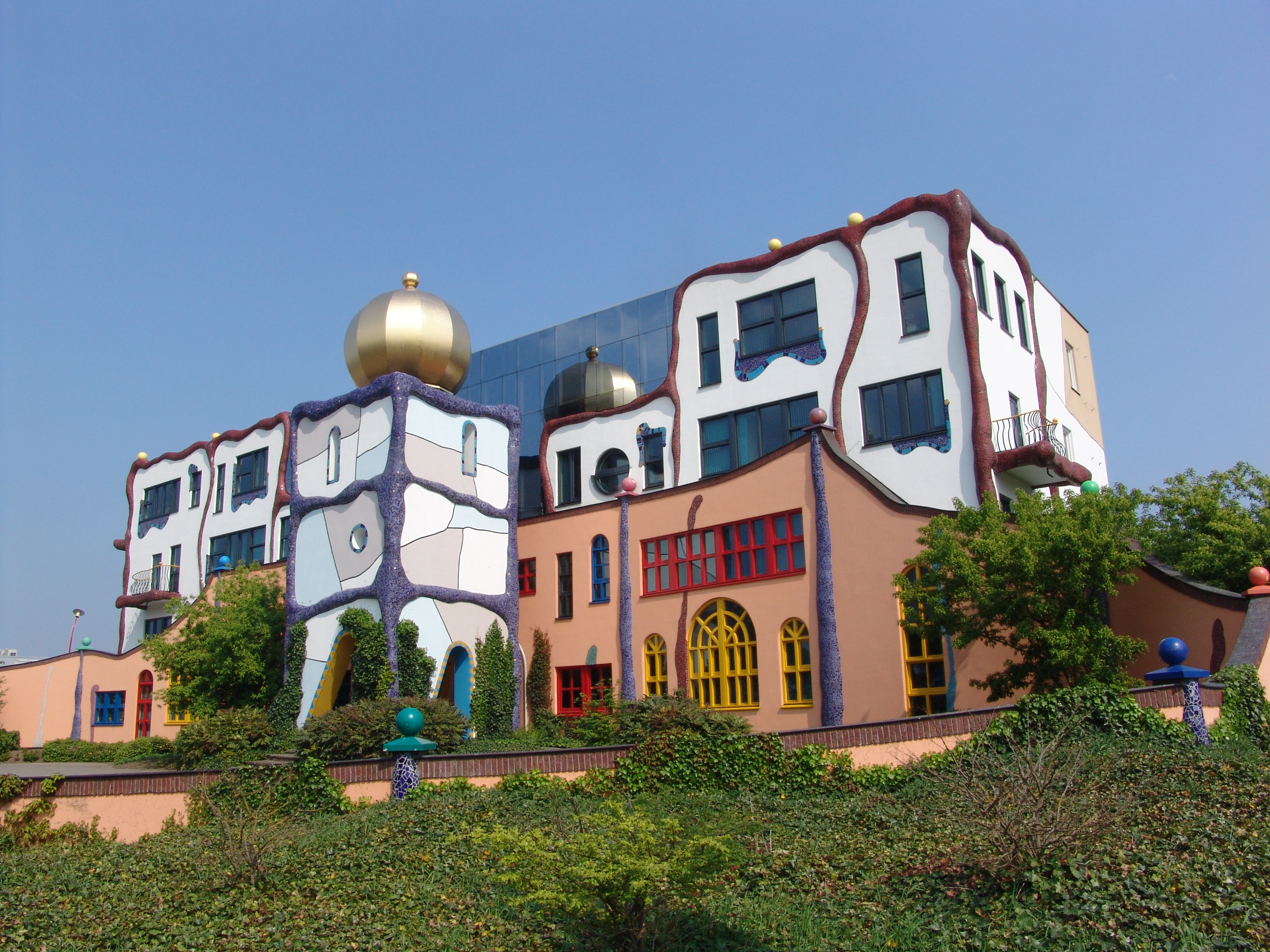
Office of Aan de Stegge, a construction company in the town of Goor

Twente is a region with rural areas and urban centres, both of which have developed distinct architectural traditions, while the region is also known for its contemporary architecture.

The Saxon heritage of Twente is reflected in the design of more traditional farms and residential houses. Twente has the only remaining lös hoes in the Netherlands (literally ‘loose house’), a type of construction design that was previously common throughout the east of the Netherlands and the north of Germany. A lös hoes consisted mostly of one room in which both humans and livestock lived together. The roofs, which are relatively large in comparison to contemporary houses, making up approximately 2/3 of the entire height, were mostly thatched and supported by a frame of thick beams. The TwentseWelle museum in Enschede has reconstructed a lös hoes on their premises. Many contemporary houses are designed with Twents Saxon elements, such as thatched roofs, wooden planks to decorate the gables, and gewelteekns (gable signs), which are wooden planks shaped with several stylised symbols, such as a tree of life, cross, anchor and heart, a sun wheel, and two rampant horses. These gewelteekns are mounted vertically onto the ridge of the house at the front and the back gable. The symbols are believed to either invoke prosperity or ward off misfortune.

The development of modern architecture in the region has been closely related to its industrial development in the 19th and 20th century, as can be recognized in multiple factory complexes, public buildings, as well as housing projects, including garden villages such as Tuindorp 't Lansink (1910s, arch. Karel Muller). Many well-known names within Dutch architectural history have left their traces in the region, among them Piet Blom, Van den Broek & Bakema, Willem Dudok, Han van Loghem, and Gerrit Rietveld, to name but a few. Of particular interest is the architecture at the campus of the Universiteit Twente, located in Enschede, built in 1961 according to the masterplan by Wim van Tijen and Samuel van Embden. Other examples of modern and contemporary architecture can be found in Enschede too, as well as in the other main urban centres, Almelo and Hengelo, but also in some smaller towns. In the town of Goor, for example, a construction company has built their main office in the style of Friedensreich Hundertwasser, who was known for using lively colours and natural forms.

Many construction companies have their origins, or main office, in Twente. Especially in the town of Rijssen, which houses over twenty more or lesser known construction companies next to companies that provide related services, such as plumbing, building insulation and electricity. This makes Twente an attractive place for architects.

=== Languages ===
The local language variety is Twents. It is a dialect of the Westphalian branch of the Low German language group, which, together with Limburgs, is one of the two officially recognised regional languages of the Netherlands. Twents is spoken in all parts of Twente, but may vary from village to village in pronunciation or lexicon, though such varieties are mutually intelligible and form part of the Low German dialect continuum. Dialects are often divided into two main categories, namely East-Twents and Twents-Groafskops, though the differences are largely insignificant. The dialects work as a certain shibboleth; minor accent differences help speakers define others' place of origin. As a result, speakers do not usually refer to their dialect by the umbrella term Twents, but rather by the name of their local variety. Speakers from Markelo, for instance, may call their dialect Maarkels, whereas speakers from Overdinkel may state that they speak Oaverdeenkels.

Although the dialect has been stigmatised for a considerable period over the last century, leading to a decline in use, interests in preserving and promoting the use of it are currently rising, resulting in initiatives such as dialect festivals, writing competitions and other culturally engaging projects. The municipality council of Rijssen-Holten holds one conference per year in dialect, and in 2008 declared their desk workers officially bilingual, to lower the threshold for the inhabitants of Rijssen who feel more comfortable in speaking Twents, rather than Dutch. Other municipality councils have recently indicated that they are willing to try dialect conferences, such as the municipalities of Hellendoorn and Wierden.

The former Van Deinse Instituut, which is now incorporated in the TwentseWelle museum, is involved in researching the past and present of Twente. It is located in Enschede and studies the regional culture, folklore, language, cultural history and landscape of Twente. It also collects, maintains, studies and displays an extensive collection of material from the history of Twente, with a full-size historic Twents lös hoes (‘open house’, a farmhouse without separate rooms, where both livestock and humans lived together) as one of its main attractions. The museum has designated a specific part of its premises for the Twentse Taalkamer (‘language room’), where visitors may become (further) acquainted with the language.

Twents is largely mutually intelligible with dialects from surrounding areas, such as Achterhooks to the south, Sallaands in the west, Grafschafter Platt (Grafschaft Bentheim) and Münsterlandisch (Münsterland) across the Dutch-German border.

== Sports ==
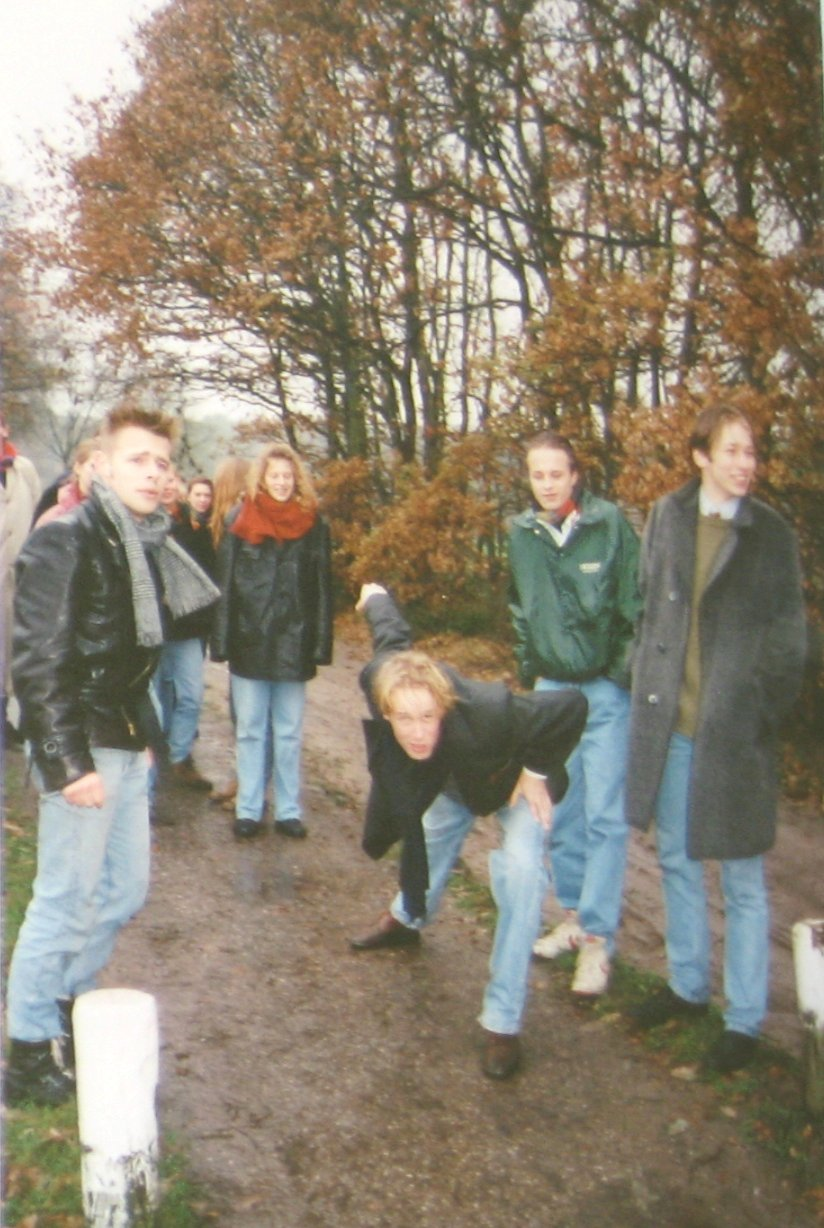
A group of friends playing klootskeetn

On a professional level, Twente houses two football clubs that play in the national Eredivisie league: Heracles Almelo and FC Twente from Enschede, the latter of which is one of the most successful sides of recent years, having won the Eredivisie title in 2010 and the KNVB Cup in 2011. Twente is also the home region of Olympic Gold swimmers such as Marleen Veldhuis and Hinkelien Schreuder, and of internationally renowned equestrians (horse driving and horse jumping), such as Jeroen Dubbeldam, Gerco Schröder and Jos Lansink.

A number of well-known bicycle racing pros are from Twente, including Bram Tankink, Tom Stamsnijder and Joost Posthuma.

On an amateur level, many people participate for leisure in popular team sports with local clubs, such as handball, tennis, soccer and volleyball.

A local traditional sport, klootskeetn, which is similar to Irish road bowling, has seen an increase in interest over the last decades. It is mainly played for leisure or for cultural engagement. There are, however, a number of (semi)-professional klootsketer clubs. It is a popular activity for staff trips.

== Places in Twente ==
Aadorp -- Albergen—Beckum -- Beuningen -- Boekelo -- Borne -- Bornerbroek -- Breklenkamp -- Buurse -- Daarle -- Daarlerveen -- Delden -- De Lutte -- Denekamp -- Deurningen -- Diepenheim -- Enschede -- Enter -- Fleringen -- Glanerbrug -- Goor -- Haaksbergen -- Hengelo -- Hengevelde -- Lattrop -- Lonneker -- Losser -- Mander -- Markelo -- Oldenzaal -- Ootmarsum -- Overdinkel -- Rossum -- Saasveld -- Tilligte -- Tubbergen -- Twekkelo -- Usselo -- Vasse -- Vriezenveen -- Vroomshoop (partly Salland) -- Weerselo -- Wierden -- Zenderen

- See also Twentestad
