= Almen =

- Village
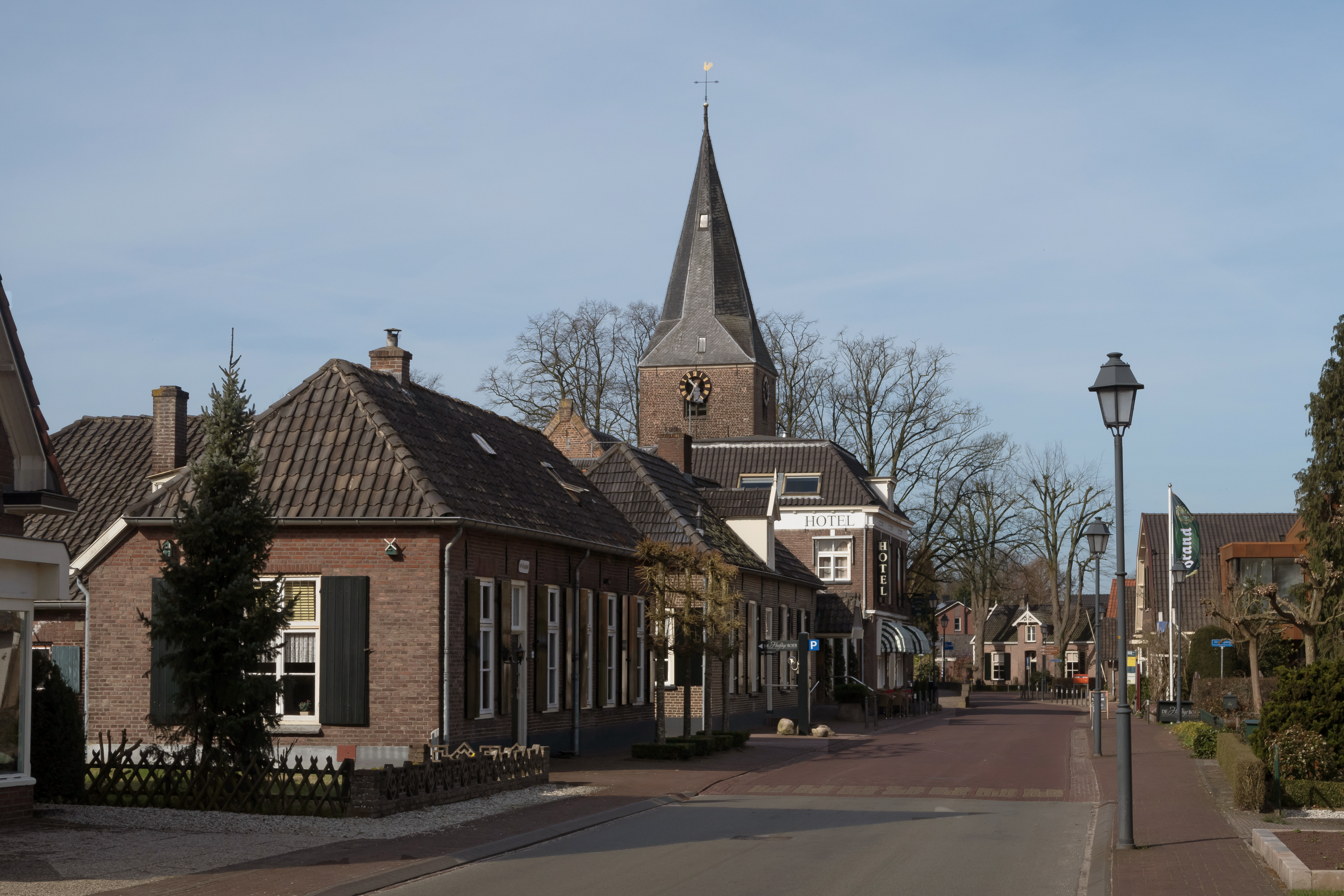
- Almen, church in the street

- Location in the Netherlands Almen (Netherlands)
- Coordinates: 52.15757°N 6.30072°E
- Country: Netherlands
- Province: Gelderland
- Municipality: Lochem

Area
  - Total: 14.06 km^{2} (5.43 sq mi)
- Elevation: 11 m (36 ft)

Population (2021)
  - Total: 1,225
  - Density: 87.13/km^{2} (225.7/sq mi)
- Time zone: UTC+1 (CET)
  - Summer (DST): UTC+2 (CEST)
- Postal code: 7218
- Dialing code: 0575

Almen is a village in the Dutch province of Gelderland. It is in the municipality Lochem, about 7 km east of the city of Zutphen.

It was first mentioned in 1188 as Almen, and means "settlement near elm trees". Castle Ehze was built around 1300. It was destroyed during the Dutch Revolt and rebuilt in 1647. In 1816, it was demolished and replaced by an estate in 1831. In 1840, it was home to 456 people.

== Gallery ==
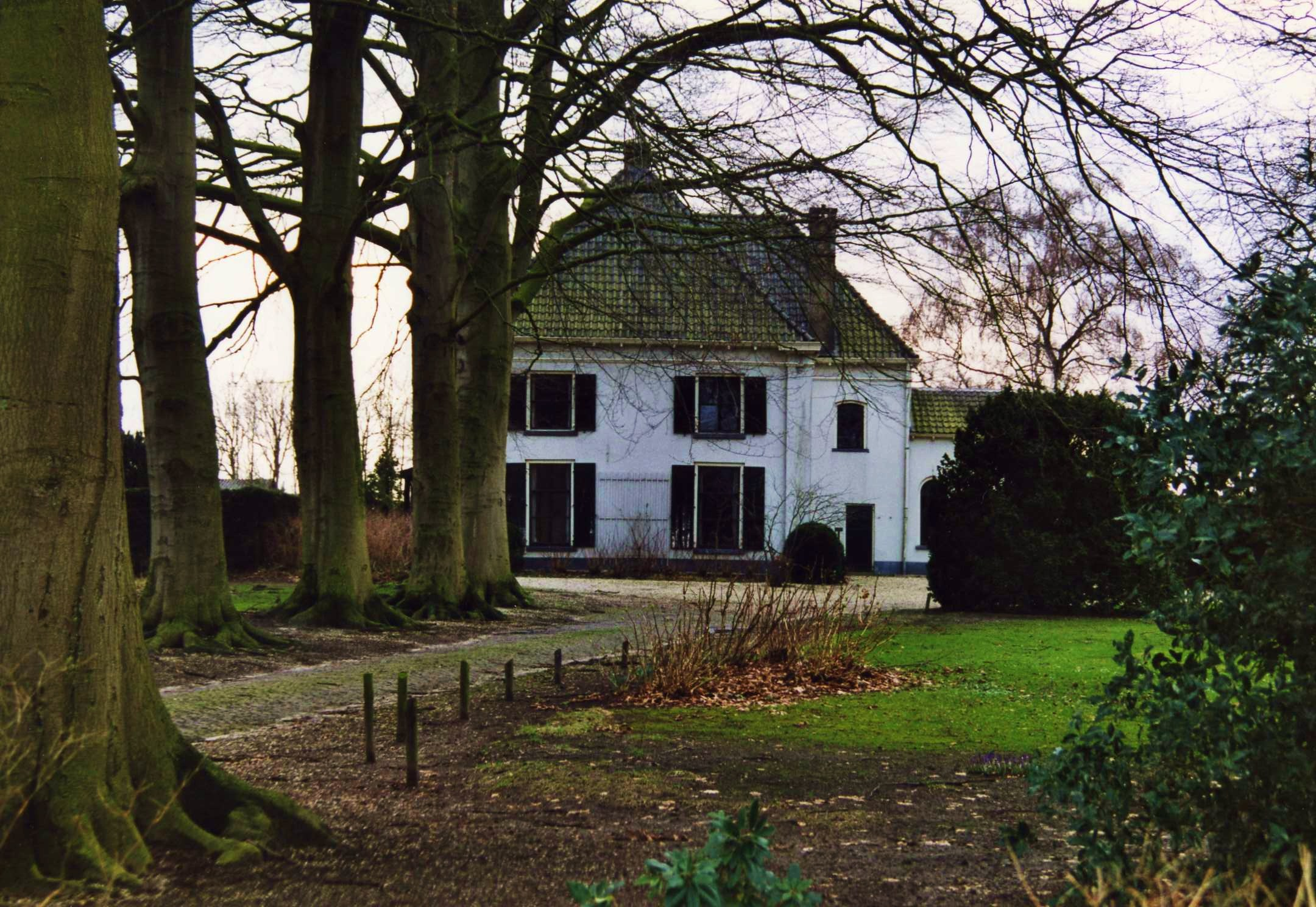
Estate Groot Have

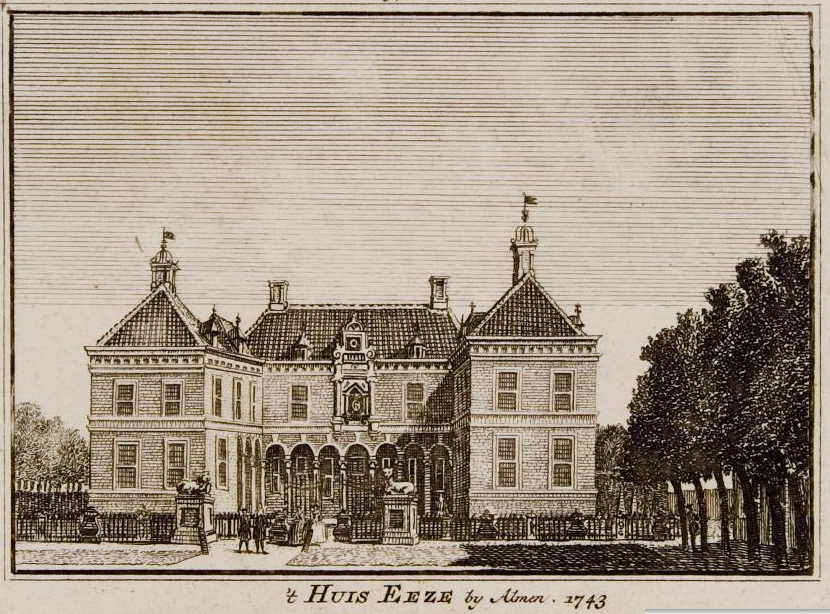
Castle Ehze (1743-1745)

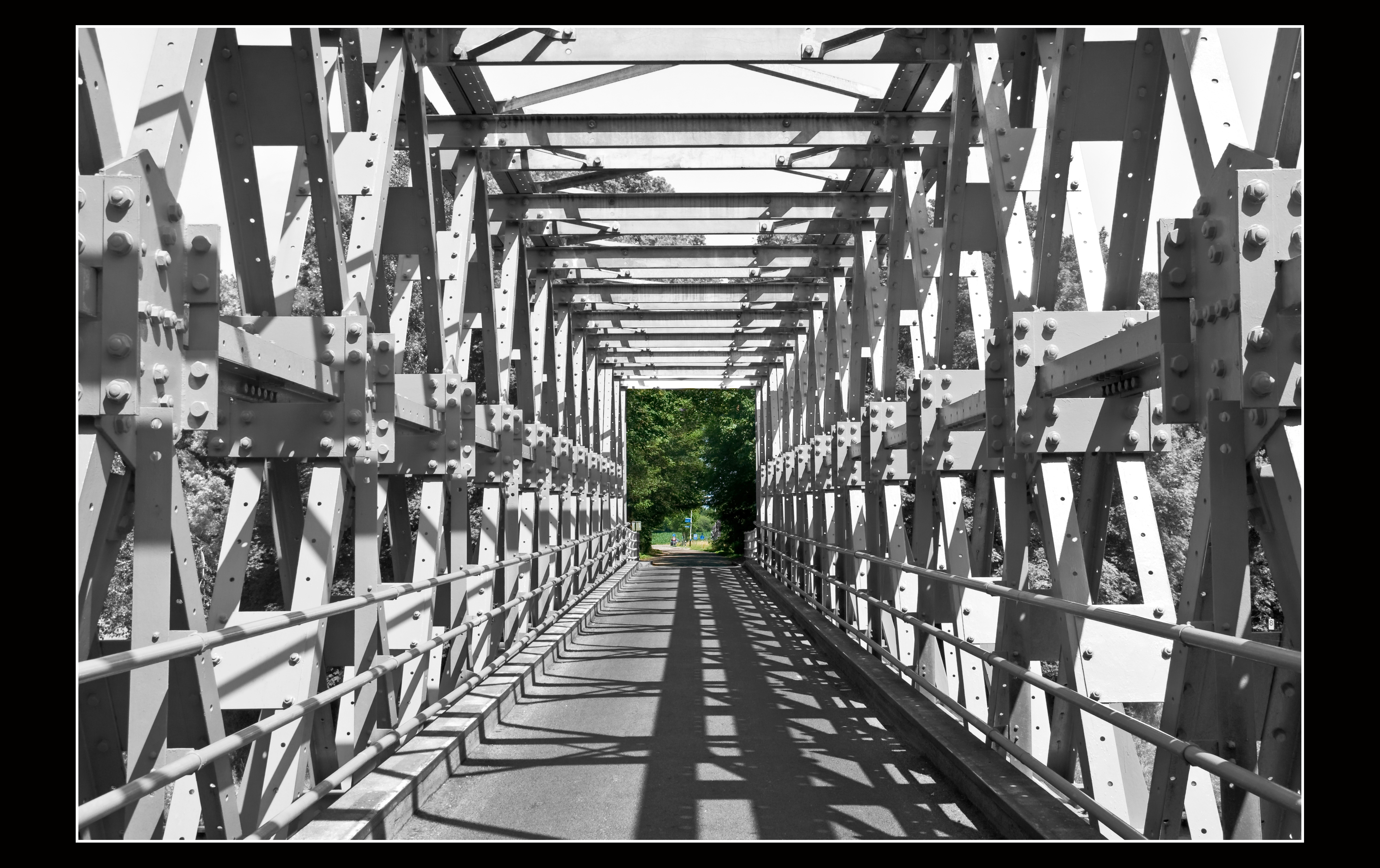
Bridge over the Twentekanaal

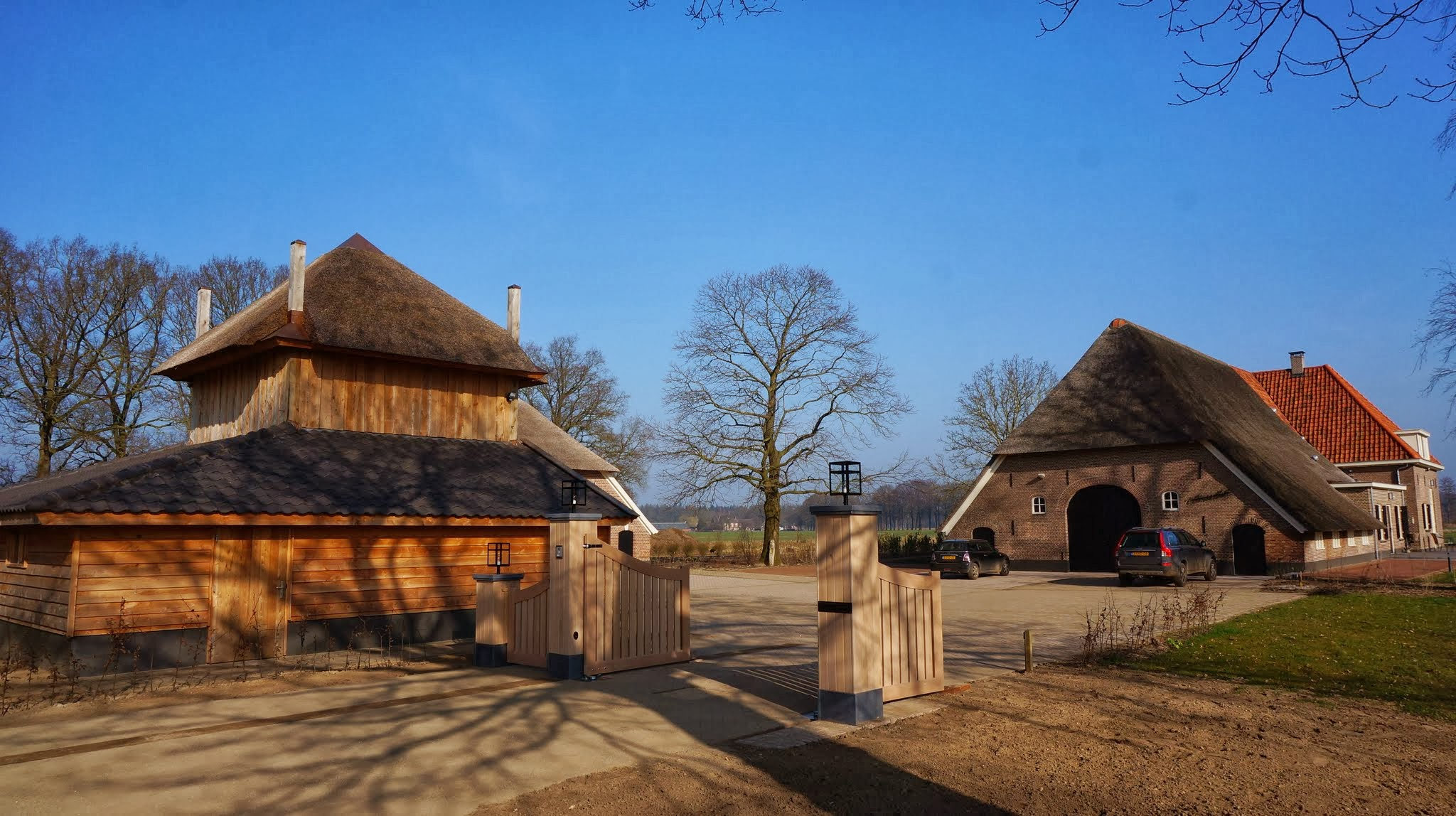
Farms in Almen
