= Aadorp =

- Village
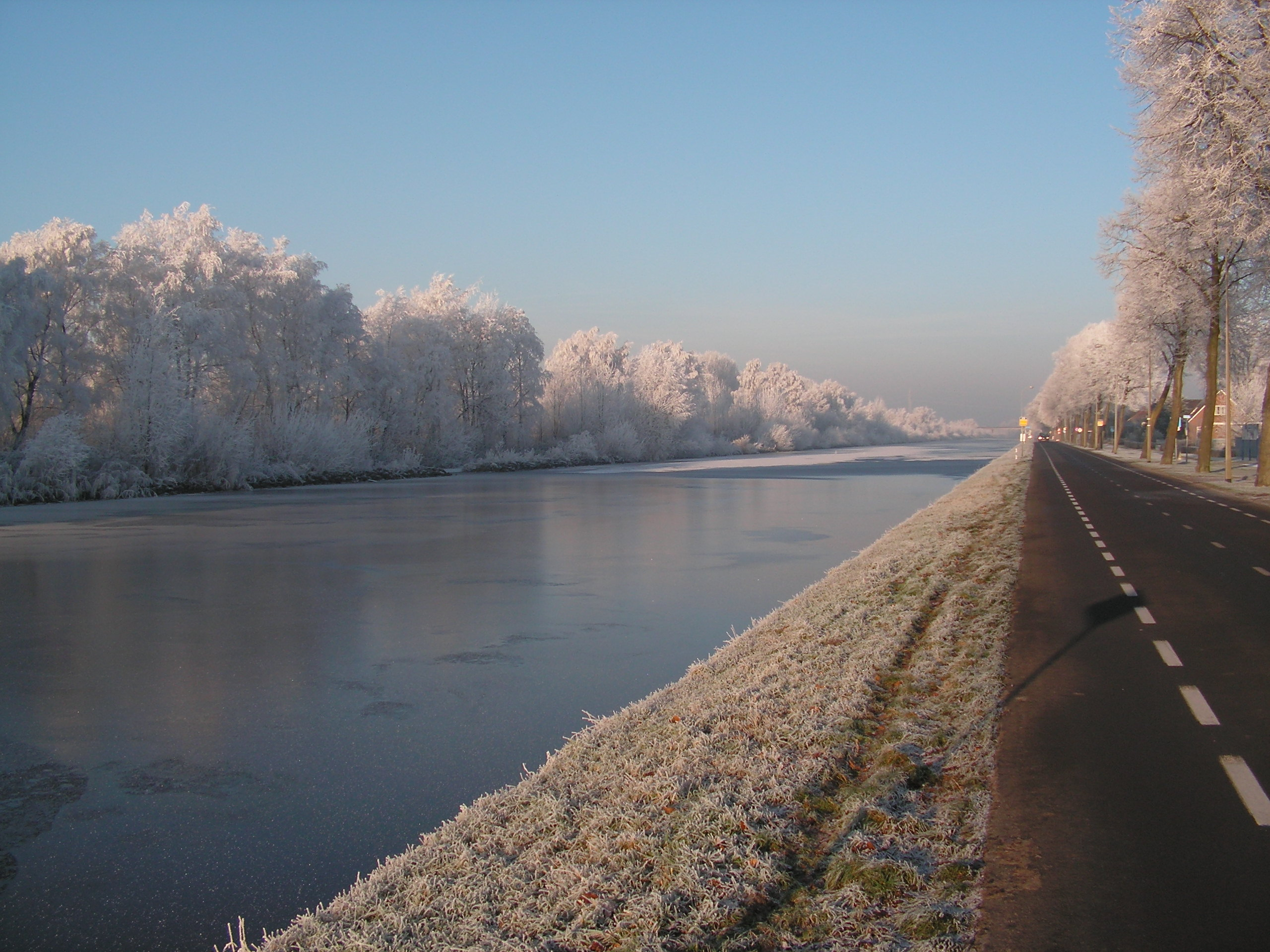
- Overijssels canal in Aadorp

- Location in the Netherlands Aadorp (Netherlands)
- Coordinates: 52°22′43″N 6°37′38″E
- Country: Netherlands
- Province: Overijssel
- Municipality: Almelo

Area
  - Total: 1.54 km^{2} (0.59 sq mi)
- Elevation: 10 m (33 ft)

Population (2021)
  - Total: 1,540
  - Density: 1,000/km^{2} (2,590/sq mi)
- Demonym: Aadorpers
- Time zone: UTC+1 (CET)
  - Summer (DST): UTC+2 (CEST)
- Postal code: 7611
- Dialing code: 0546

Aadorp is a village on the northern side of Almelo, Netherlands with a population of about 1500; it has been part of the Almelo municipality since 2001. The villagers of Aadorp are very close, since there are so few of them. The central meeting point in Aadorp is the Aahoes community center, which consists of a meeting hall, and a small barbershop. Also, Aadorp has recreation areas including soccer fields and more. For anything else Aadorp villagers must go to one of the neighbouring towns.

== History ==
The village was first mentioned in 1867 as Aabrug, and means "settlement on the river Aa". The river Aa is nowadays part of the Twentekanaal. The village has formally existed since 3 November 1930 when the hamlets of Woesten and Buitenwonen were merged into the village of Aadorp. In the early 20th century, it was a peat excavation settlement. There was a railway station of the Mariënberg to Almelo railway line between 1920 and 1938. In 1925, a Dutch Reformed church was built in the village. It was replaced in 1992.

== Geography ==
Aadorp is situated around the small canal Almelo-De Haandrik, which connects it to Vriezenveen on the northern side and to Almelo on the southern side. A train track leads right next to this canal and also heads from Almelo to Vriezenveen. Aadorp's neighbours are:

- Vriezenveen to the north side
- Almelo on the southeast side
- Wierden on the west side

== Gallery ==
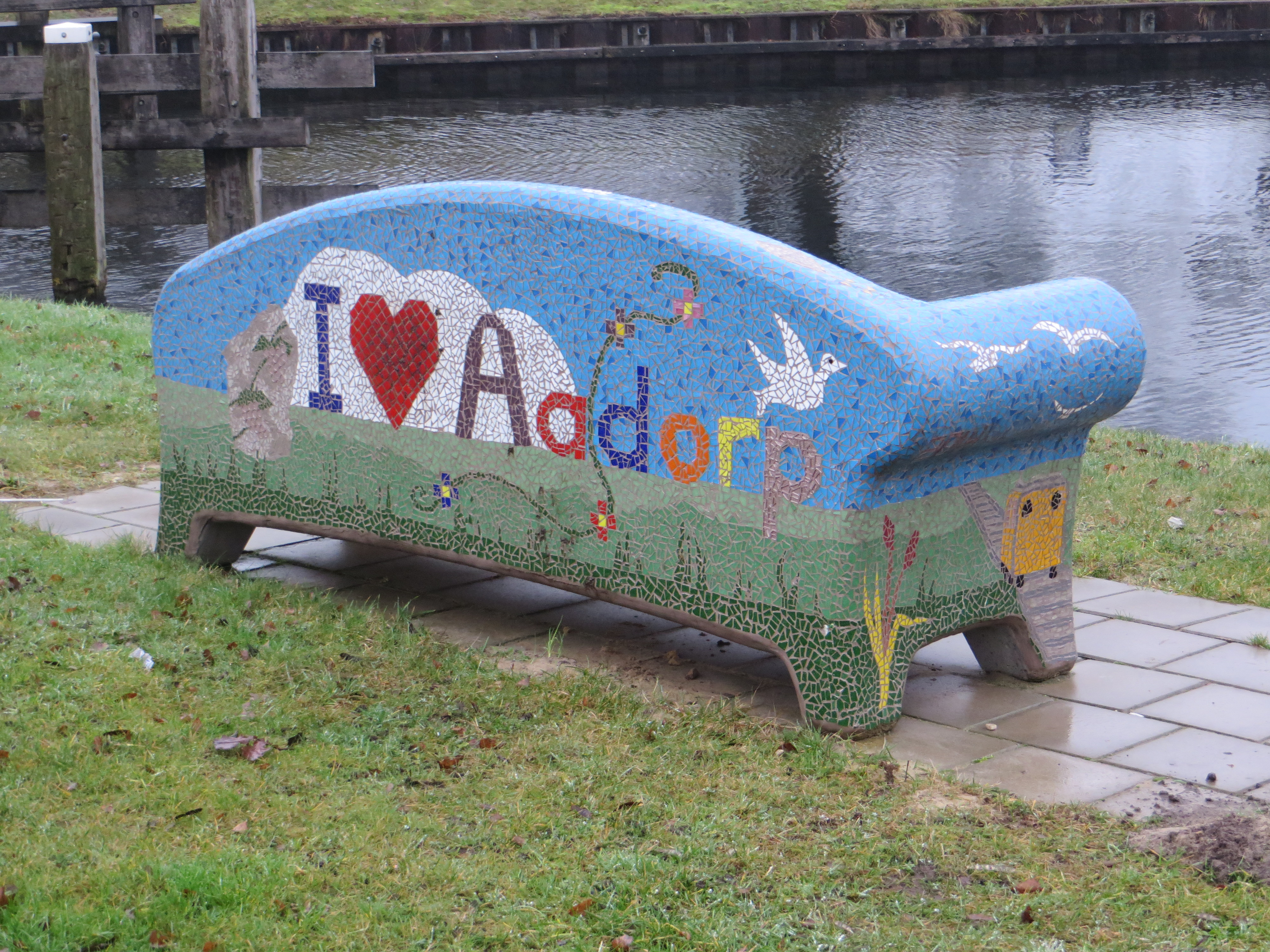
Social sofa

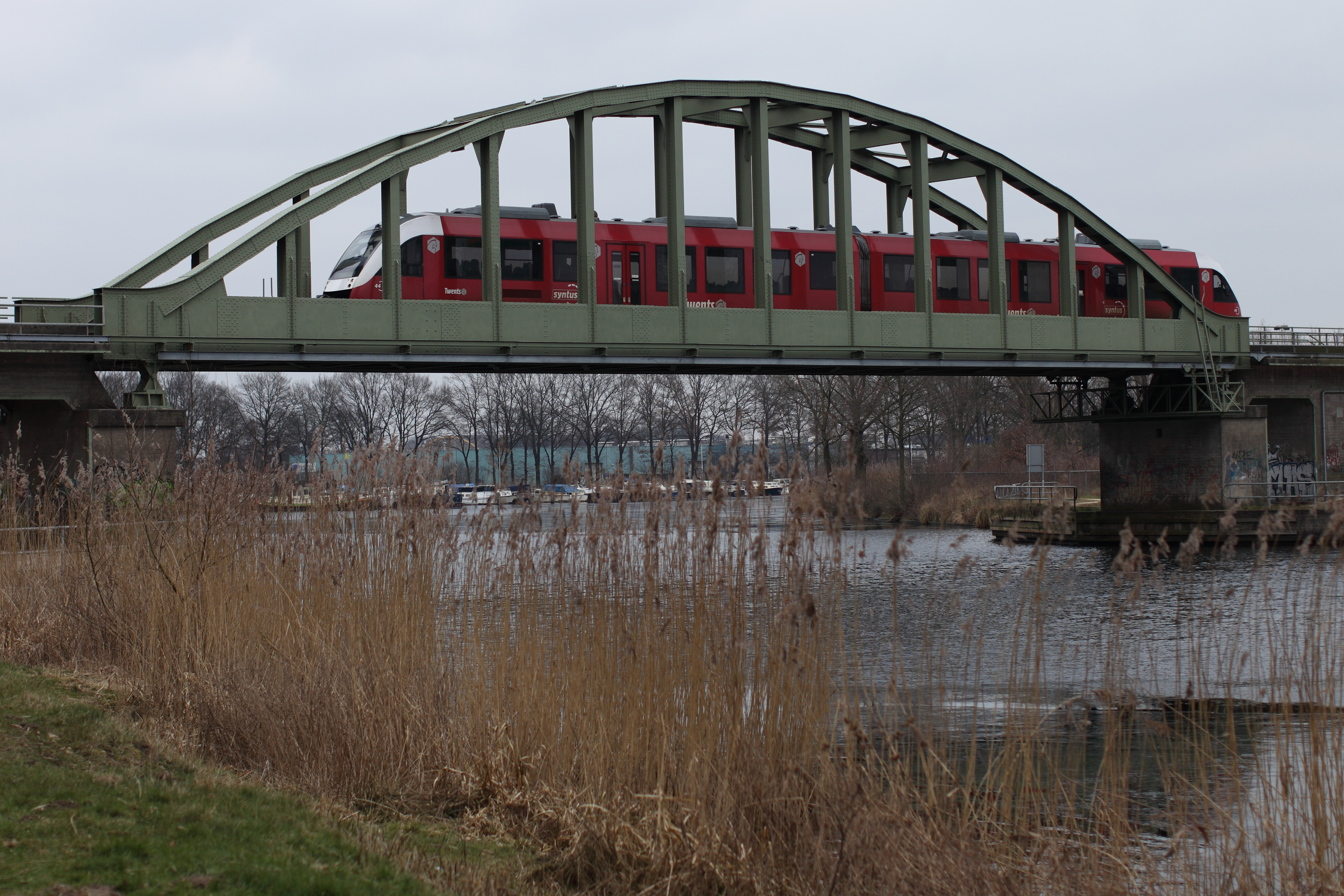
Railway bridge
