= Usselo =

- Village
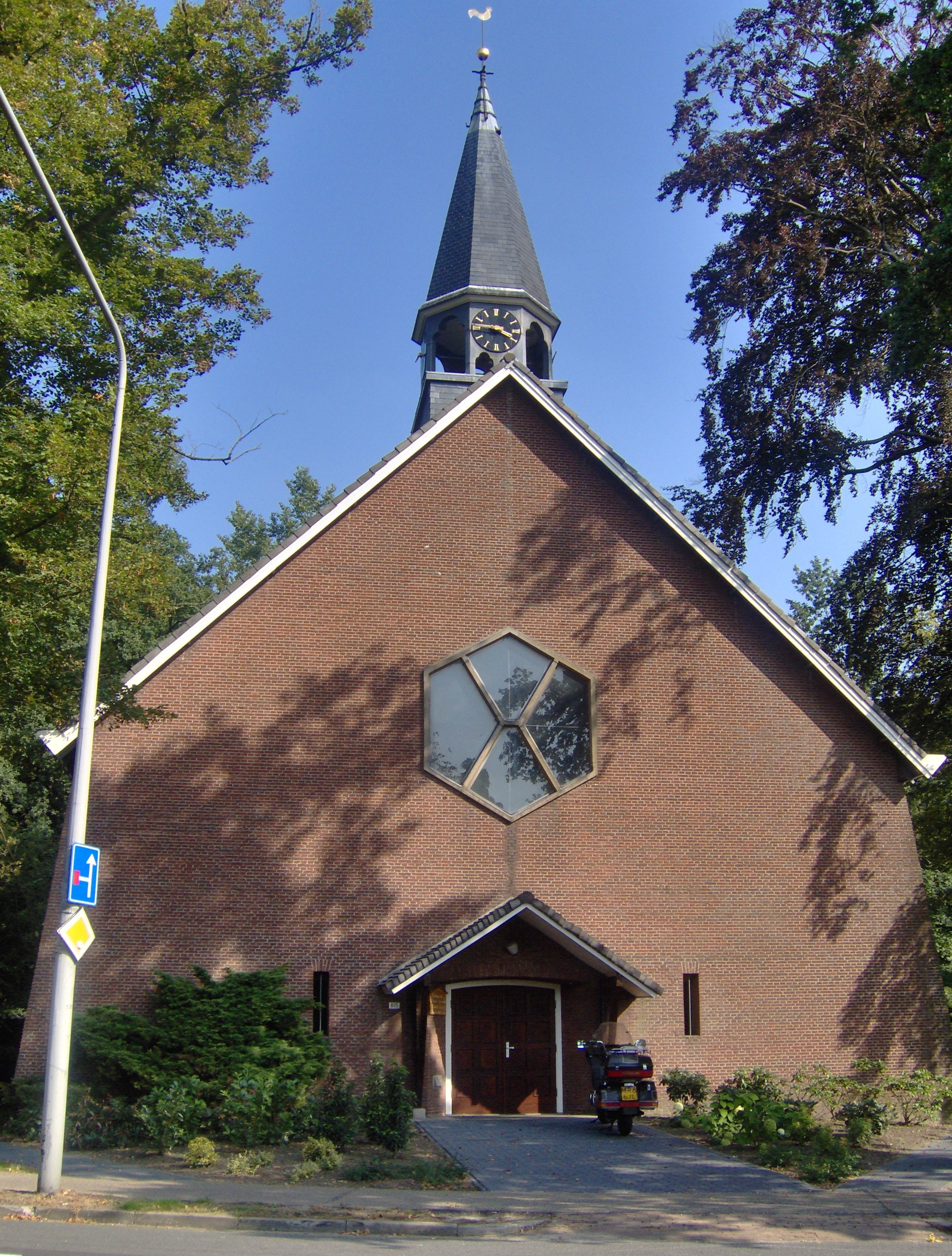
- The Dutch Reformed church in Usselo

- Location in the Netherlands Usselo (Netherlands)
- Coordinates: 52°12′12″N 6°49′57″E
- Country: Netherlands
- Province: Overijssel
- Municipality: Enschede

Area
  - Total: 4.09 km^{2} (1.58 sq mi)
- Elevation: 32 m (105 ft)

Population (2021)
  - Total: 320
  - Density: 78/km^{2} (200/sq mi)
- Demonym: Usseloër
- Time zone: UTC+1 (CET)
  - Summer (DST): UTC+2 (CEST)
- Postal code: 7545
- Dialing code: 053

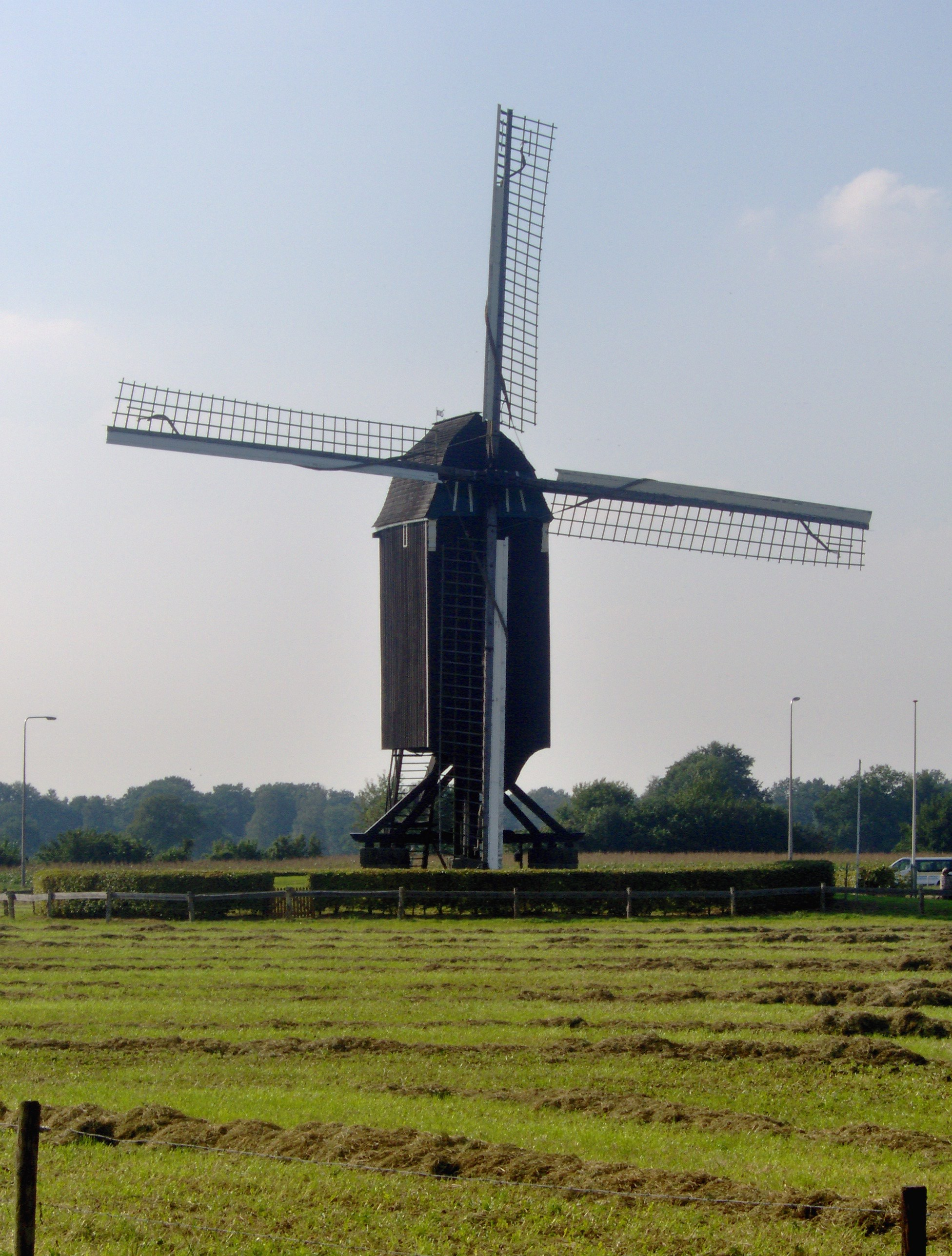
The windmill Wissinks Möl

Usselo (Dutch pronunciation: ['ʏsəloː]) is a Dutch village in the municipality of Enschede in the eastern Netherlands region of Twente. It is located just west of Enschede and east of Boekelo. It has existed for over 800 years. Archaeology shows that the region was inhabited more or less continuously since the last ice-age. The region is very fertile and will support agriculture and cattle. The countryside is marked by artificial hills, called es or esch, which were formed by depositing dung mixed with dirt. A prime example is the Fleringer Esch, near Fleringen.

== History ==
The village was one of the earliest settlements in the area. This was confirmed by finds of the remains of a prehistoric village (on the Usseler Es). During World War II the village was bombed by Allied fighters strafing the retreating German forces. This unfortunately led to casualties in the village bakery.

The village has a Dutch Reformed church, a church of the Christelijke Gemeente Nederland, a primary school and some shops. Of interest are the windmill (of the rare Stenderkast model), called Wissinks Möl ("Wissink's Mill"), and the Usseler Es, the man-made elevation forming the heart of the village farmlands. The village has a primary school, dating back to 1766 but now housed in a new building behind the church. Grolsch Brewery is located on the road to Boekelo. Usselo's rural landscape, notably its es, has been transformed by encroaching housing and industry.

Usselo, together with neighbouring Boekelo and Enschede, hosts the annual Military Boekelo Enschede, an international equestrian event usually held in October. The village is also notable for being the location of the novel, The Upstairs Room by Johanna Reiss. She was a Jewish girl taken into a family in Usselo while hiding from the German occupation during World War II. Further literary links consist of the poets H.H. ter Balkt, who was born in Usselo, and Willem Wilmink, who spent part of his youth in Usselo.

Usselo observes the tradition of Noaberschop, which is the social framework governing relations in Twenthe.

== Usselo Soil ==
Usselo is the type site for the 'Usselo Soil', which is also known as either the 'Usselo horizon' or 'Usselo layer'. It is a distinctive and widespread Weichselian (Lateglacial) buried soil, paleosol, that is found within Lateglacial eolian sediments known as 'cover sands' in the Netherlands, western Germany, and western Denmark. This paleosol is classified as either a weakly podzolized Arenosol or as a weakly podzolized Regosol. Numerous radiocarbon dates, optically stimulated luminescence dates, pollen analyses, and archaeological evidence from a number of locations have been interpreted to show that the Usselo Soil formed as the result of pedogenesis during a period of landscape stability during the Allerød oscillation. Locally, the period of landscape stability and pedogenesis associated with the formation of the Usselo Soil continued into the Younger Dryas stadial. The 'Usselo Soil' is an extremely important and very useful marker bed that is used by European archaeologists and geologists in their research.

Proponents of the widely disputed Younger Dryas impact hypothesis (YDIH) proposed that the abundant charcoal, which is found in the Usselo Soil, and contemporaneous Lateglacial paleosols and organic sediments across Europe, may have been created by wildfires caused by a large bolide impact. This conclusion is based upon the reported occurrence of alleged extraterrestrial impact indicators and hypothetical correlations with Clovis-age organic beds in North America. However, many geologists and geomorphologists wholly dispute the contemporaneous nature of the Usselo Soil with Clovis-age organic beds in North America, the presence of impact indicators within it, and the impact origin of the charcoal. The YDIH has now been refuted comprehensively by earth scientists and planetary impact specialists.
