= Johanna Reiss =

Dutch-American writer (born 1932)

- Born: 4 April 1932 (age 94); Winterswijk, Netherlands
- Occupation: novelist
- Spouse: Jim Reiss (1955–1969)
- Writing career
- Period: 1969 - present
- Subject: The Holocaust
- Notable work: The Upstairs Room (1972)
- Notable awards: Newbery Honor, ALA Notable Book, Jewish Book Council Children's Book Award, Buxtehuder Bulle Prize

Johanna Reiss (/riːs/ REESS; born 4 April 1932) is a Dutch-American writer whose work focuses on her experiences as a Jewish child during the Second World War. Her books have been compared to the writing of Anne Frank.

== Early life ==
Johanna Reiss was born Johanna "Annie" de Leeuw on 4 April 1932 in Winterswijk in The Netherlands, one of three sisters. Reiss was from a Jewish family and survived the Holocaust, along with her older sister Sini, by hiding in the attic of a farming family (Johan and Dientje Oosterveld, and his mother, Opoe) in the rural village of Usselo for three years. Her mother was in hospital, where she died from causes unrelated to the conflict, and her father and oldest sister Rachel were in hiding, separately.

After World War II, Reiss graduated from college and taught elementary school. In 1955 she moved to the United States, where she married Jim Reiss and brought up two daughters. Her husband encouraged her to write about her experiences during the war, which resulted in the young adult novel, The Upstairs Room.

== Professional life ==
Reiss's YA novel The Upstairs Room, which outlined her experiences during the Second World War, was published in 1972. It won several awards, including a Newbery Honor Book, an American Library Association Notable Children's Book, and a Jane Addams Peace Association Honor Book. It also won the National Jewish Book Award, the Juvenile Book Award and the Buxtehuder Bulle, a German children's book award. Elie Wiesel commented that The Upstairs Room was "as important in every respect as the one bequeathed to us by Anne Frank."

The Upstairs Room's success led to Reiss writing a sequel, The Journey Back, published in 1976. This tells the story of Reiss and her family's attempt to rebuild their lives after the war.

In 2009, Reiss wrote A Hidden Life, a memoir about her childhood memories, as well as her husband's suicide.

In 2026, Reiss wrote Beyond Hiding: My Sisters and I, a memoir about her family's experiences in hiding in World War II and the long reach of those traumatic experiences that followed them into their later years. title=Beyond Hiding: My Sisters and I June, 2026 Published by Graymalkin Media, available on Amazon.

For decades, Reiss regularly visited schools in both the US and Europe to talk about her experience of the Holocaust in The Netherlands. In May 2018, she was awarded the Knight of Order of Orange-Nassau in recognition of her speaking efforts by the Dutch government.
