= H. H. ter Balkt =

Dutch poet

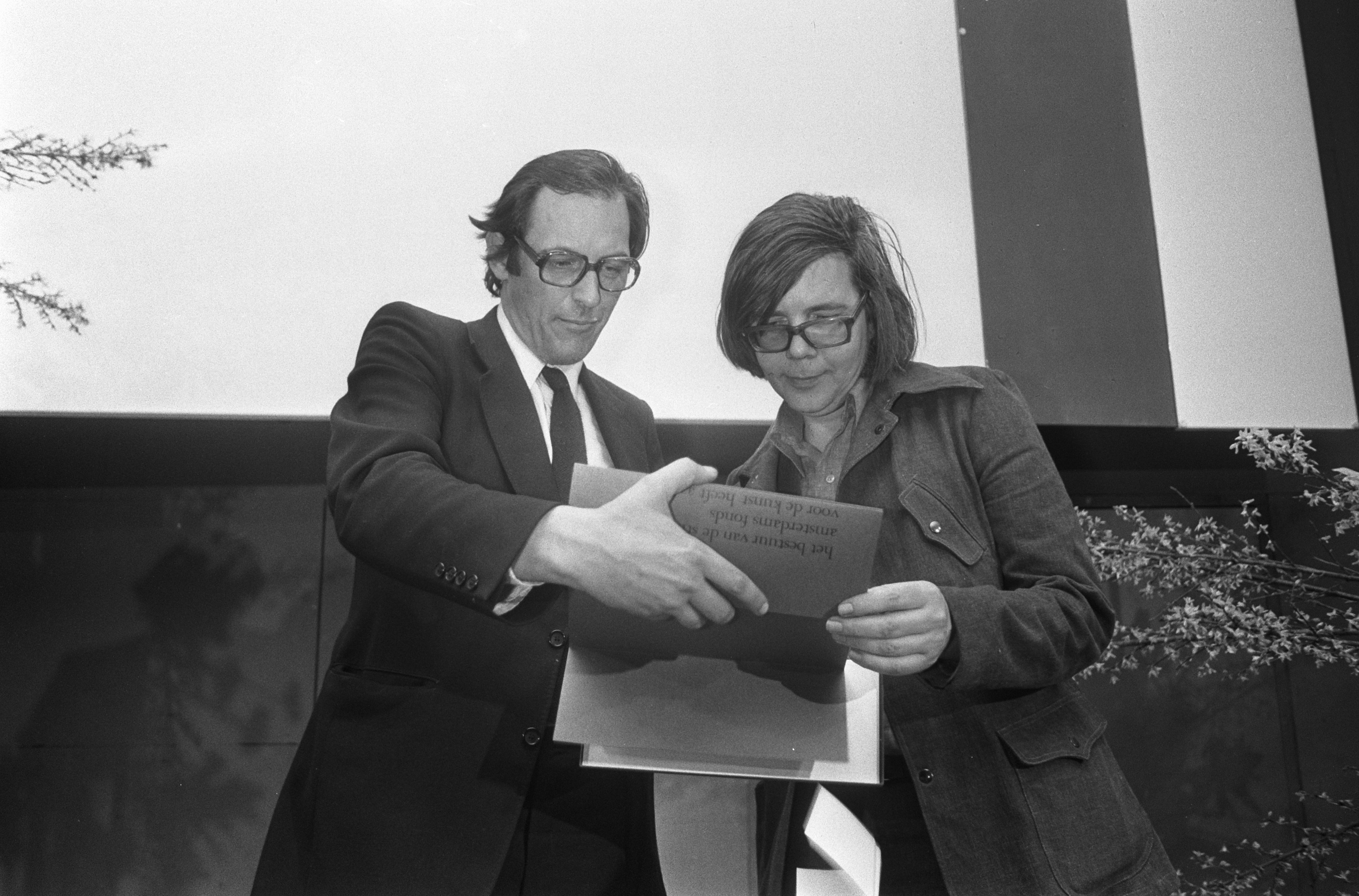
- H.H. ter Balkt (right) with Han Lammers in 1974
- Born: Herman Hendrik ter Balkt; 17 September 1938; Usselo, Netherlands
- Died: 9 March 2015 (aged 76); Nijmegen, Netherlands
- Occupations: Poet, teacher
- Writing career
- Language: Dutch

Herman Hendrik ter Balkt (17 September 1938 – 9 March 2015) was a Dutch poet. He won numerous awards throughout his career, among them the 1988 Jan Campert Prize, the 1998 Constantijn Huygens Prize and the 2003 P. C. Hooft Award. He was born in Usselo, Overijssel and died in Nijmegen.

== Bibliography ==
=== English ===
- H.H. ter Balkt: How to start a wine cellar. Selected poems 1969-1984. Transl. by Wanda Boeke [et al.], introd. by Johanna H. Prins. Amsterdam, Bridges Books, 1984. ISBN 90-70306-11-5

=== Dutch ===
- 1969 - Boerengedichten ofwel Met de boerenbijl
- 1970 - Uier van het Oosten
- 1972 - De gloeilampen, De varkens
- 1973 - Groenboek
- 1973 - Zwijg (novel, under the pseudonym Foel Aos of Habakuk II)
- 1974 - Zoals de honingappel
- 1974 - Ikonen
- 1975 - Oud gereedschap mensheid moe
- 1976 - De vliegen dragen de zomer
- 1977 - Helgeel landjuweel
- 1978 - Joseph Beuys
- 1979 - Waar de burchten stonden en de snoek zwom
- 1982 - Machines!: maai ons niet, maai de rogge
- 1983 - Hemellichten
- 1986 - Verkeerde raadhuizen
- 1987 - Aardes deuren
- 1990 - Het Strand van Amsterdam
- 1990 - In de kalkbranderij van het absolute
- 1991 - Laaglandse hymnen
- 1992 - Ode aan de grote kiezelwal en andere gedichten
- 1993 - Het bonenstro
- 1998 - Tegen de bijlen: oden en anti-oden
- 2000 - In de waterwingebieden (poems 1953-1999)
- 2002 - Laaglandse hymnen II
- 2003 - Anti-canto's
- 2003 - Laaglandse hymnen I - III
- 2004 - Anti-canto's en De Astatica
- 2007 - Zwijg / De gedenatureerde delta (novel from 1973 and collected critics)
- 2008 - Vuur
- 2010 - Onder de bladerkronen
- 2011 - Vliegtuigmagneet
- 2014 - Hee hoor mij ho simultaan op de brandtorens (collected poems)
