= Twentestad =

Proposal for the merger of two cities and a town in the eastern part of the Netherlands

Twentestad was a proposal for the merger of two cities and a town in the eastern part of the Netherlands, in the province of Overijssel. Enschede, Hengelo and parts of Borne would become an urban area in Twente, with about 250,000 inhabitants.

Municipalities of Netwerkstad Twent

The merger never occurred, because of limited funding from the government and because 90% of all inhabitants of Hengelo were against it. They feared more problems, like criminality and traffic problems. After the project had been cancelled in 2000, Enschede, Hengelo, Borne and the neighbouring cities of Almelo and (later) Oldenzaal decided to intensify their collaboration as Netwerkstad Twente.

A radio station with same name however exists .
