= Lonneker =

- Village
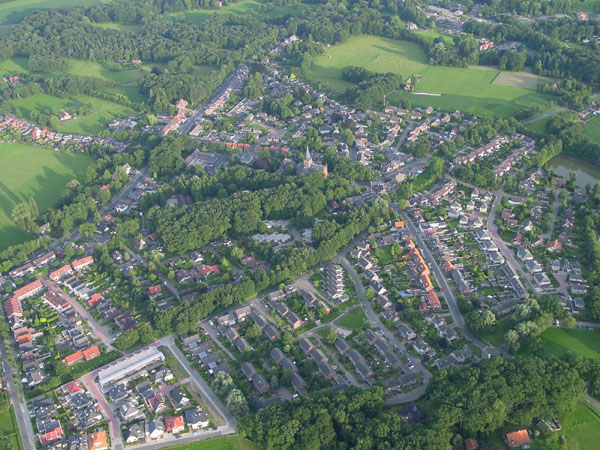
- Aerial view of Lonneker

- Coat of arms
- Nicknames: Droadneagels, Papsleevn
- Location in the Netherlands Lonneker (Netherlands)
- Coordinates: 52°15′2″N 6°54′43″E
- Country: Netherlands
- Province: Overijssel
- Municipality: Enschede

Area
  - Total: 0.89 km^{2} (0.34 sq mi)
- Elevation: 51 m (167 ft)

Population (2021)
  - Total: 1,895
  - Density: 2,100/km^{2} (5,500/sq mi)
- Time zone: UTC+1 (CET)
  - Summer (DST): UTC+2 (CEST)
- Postal code: 7524
- Dialing code: 053

Lonneker (Dutch pronunciation: [ˈlɔnəkər]) is a village in Twente, in the province of Overijssel. It is located in the municipality of Enschede, about 3 km north of the city centre.

== History ==
The village was first mentioned in the late 10th century as "in Loningheri", and means "settlement on a sandy ridge of the people of Lono (person)". Lonneker is an esdorp which developed in the Early Middle Ages.

The Catholic St. Jacobus de Meerdere was built between 1911 and 1912 as a replacement for the 1820 church. Lonneker was home to 1,546 people in 1840.

In 1811, five marke (predecessor of municipality) were split into the municipalities of Lonneker and Enschede. Lonneker used to encircle Enschede. In 1884, a part of the municipality was given to the city. It remained an independent municipality until 1934, when it became part of Enschede.

In 1927, the 4th Anarchist Pinksterlanddagen or "pinkster-mobilisatie" where held in Lonneker. Amongst the speakers where T.Wessels, H. Schuurman and Albert de Jong. On the last day there was a demonstration that got stopped by police violence.

== Gallery ==
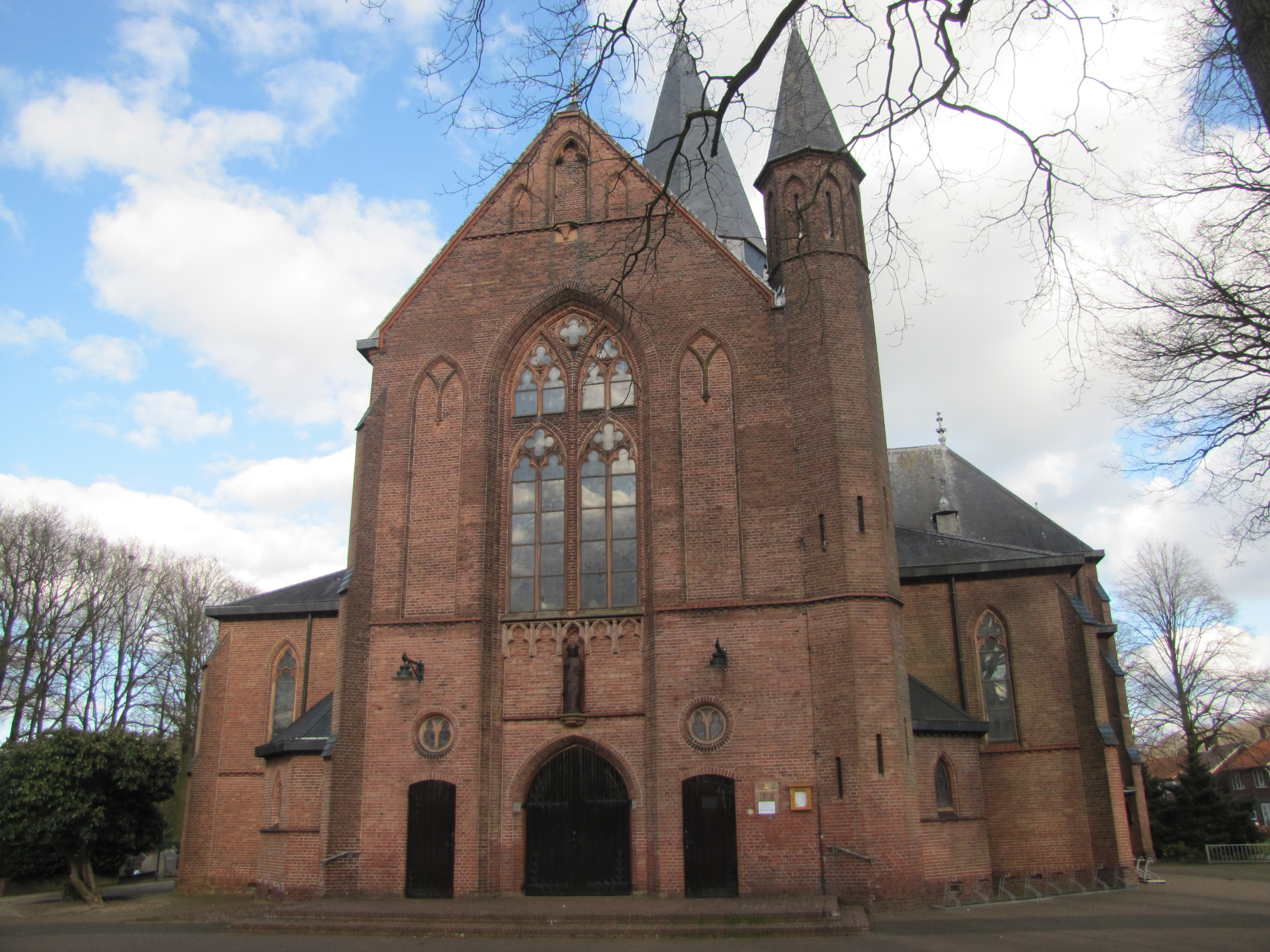
Lonneker church located at the main square

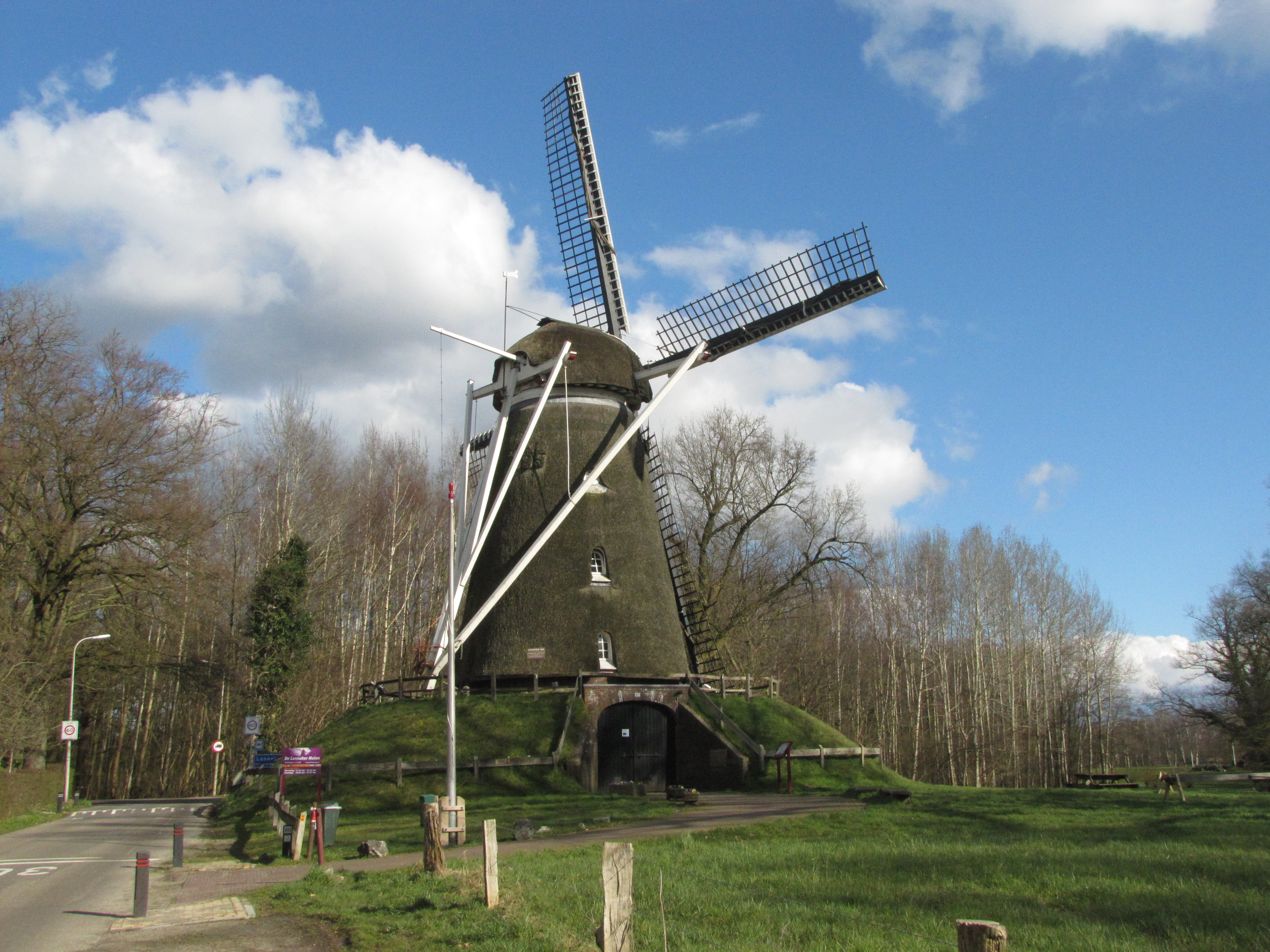
Lonneker Windmill
