= De Museumfabriek =

Museum in Enschede, Netherlands

Coordinates: 52.2323°N 6.8910°E

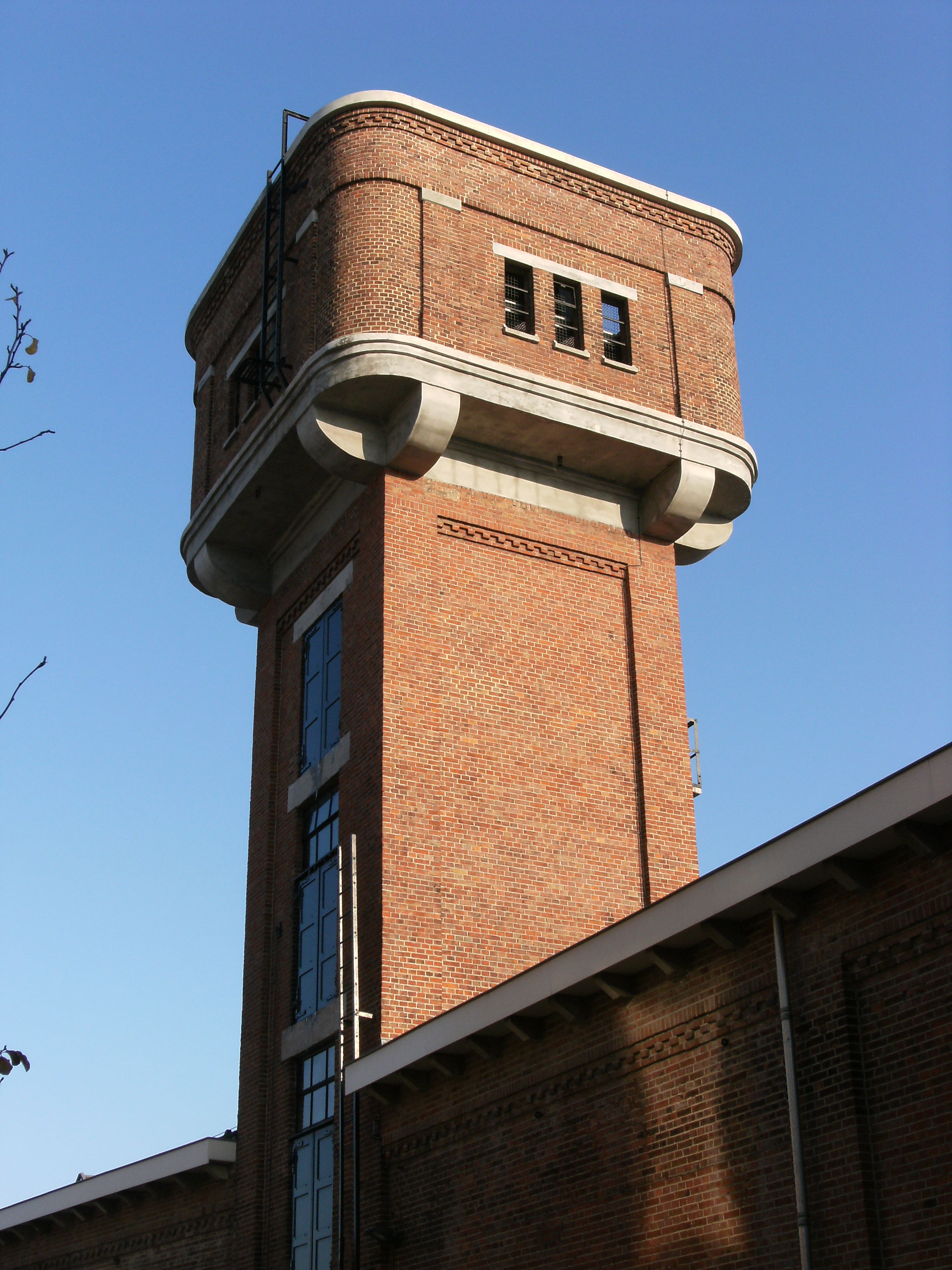
Former watertower in De Museumfabriek

De Museumfabriek (formerly Twentse Welle) is a merger of the former Jannink Museum of Textiles, the Museum of National History and the Van Deinse Institute on Social Life. The museum is located in Enschede, Netherlands. The new museum is located partly in a renovated Rozendaal textile factory, in reference to Enschede's textile history, and partly in an adjourning new building designed by the Amsterdam-based firm SeARCH. The project architect was Bjarne Mastenbroek. It is an Anchor point on the European Route of Industrial Heritage.

== History ==
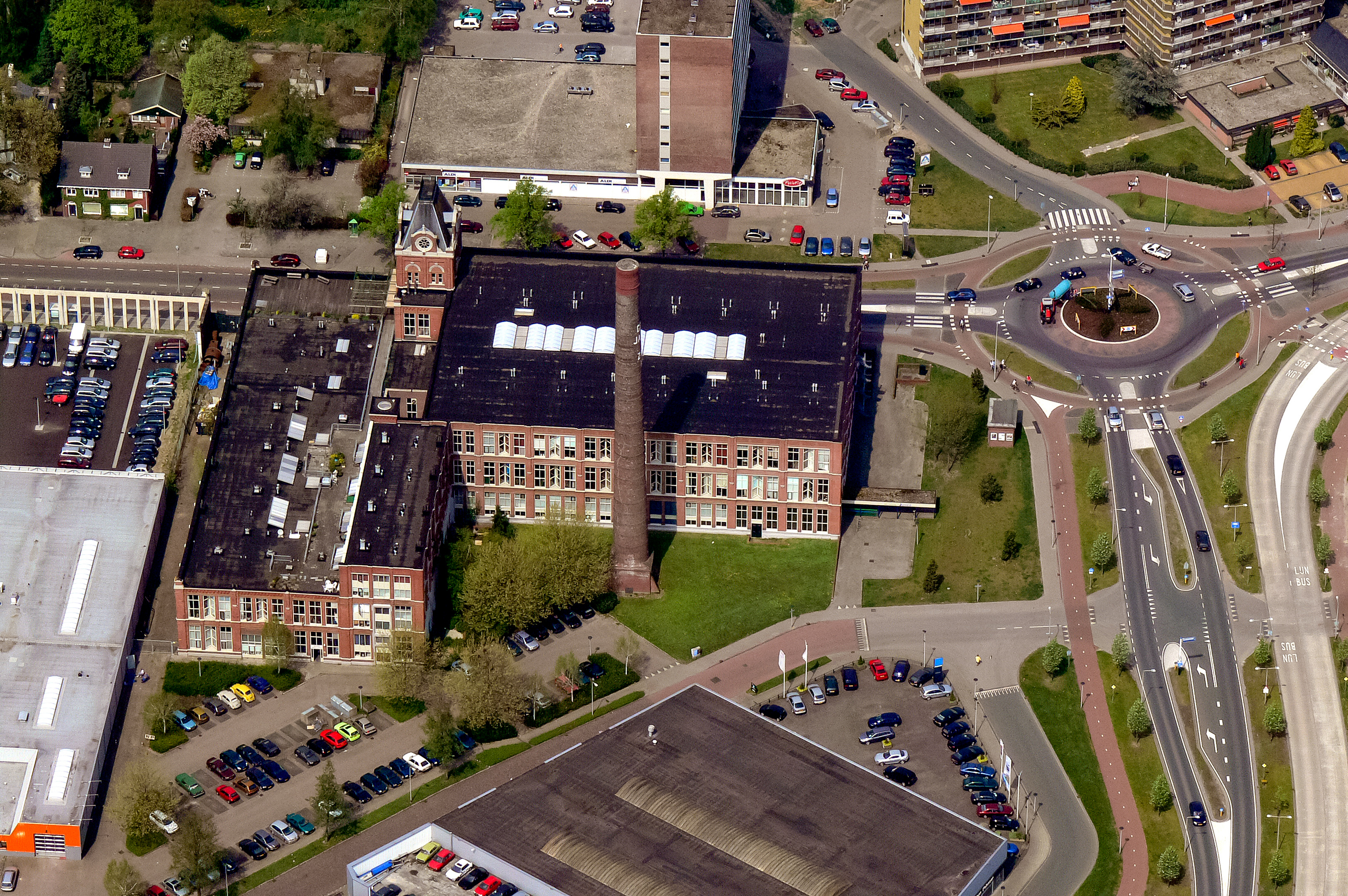
Janninks mill 2006

The Museum of Textiles was originally located in the former textile factory of Jannink. Egbert Jannink set up this factory in 1810. The factory operated until 1967. It is a Rijksmonument (listed building). (Note: Rijksmonument number 15299.) The building was refurbished from 1975. The Jannink museum moved onto the ground floor in 1980; other floors were converted into housing. In 2008 the museum closed its doors and the collection was incorporated into the new museum Twentse Welle in the Roombeek district.

Suggestion to move the text below to a new Wikipedia page on the former Janninkfactory, as it has nothing to do with the current Museumfabriek:

The fireproof mill was designed and built by Sidney Stott. There were 70 fireproof textile mills constructed in Twente between 1880 and 1914. Stott, the Oldham architect, not to be confused with his cousins Stott and Sons, was a millwright who cooperated with most advanced textile machine manufacturers: the mill was handed over complete with power source, line shafting and all the spinning machines needed to spin cotton. The building was modelled on similar double-mills in Lancashire. A central tower housed the engine and the water tank for the sprinklers; to either side were the three-storey mills with the large uninterrupted floors needed for mule spinning. The height of the chimney was determined by up-draught needed by the boilers.

The 1900 build was laid out with 16 self-acting mules and 48 Asa Lees & Co ring frames giving a total of 30,000 spindles. There were 568 power looms. In 1908 Stott returned and added the water tower and the sprinkler system; outside England it was tradition to build the name of the mill into the chimney rather than the water tower.

== Collections ==
- The collection of the former Jannink Museum focuses on life and work in Twente. The textile sector dominated the lives of the poor for over 200 years. The collection shows the lives of the linen handloom weavers working from home, and all the stages of industrial life thereafter.
- The natural history collection of the Museumfabriek originates from the former Natuurmuseum Enschede.
- Van Deinse Instituut was involved in researching the past and present of Twente. It studied the regional culture, folklore, language, cultural history and landscape of Twente. The heritage of the Van Deinse Institute is an extensive collection of material from the history of Twente, with a full-size historic Twents Lös Hoes (open house, a farm house without separate rooms, where both livestock and humans lived together) as one of its main attractions.
- The museum has designated a specific part of its premises for the Twentse Taalkamer (language room), where visitors may become acquainted with the Twents language.
