= Twentekanaal =

Canal in Netherlands

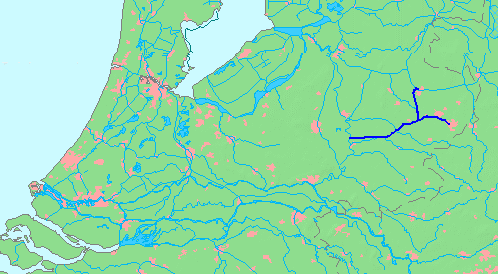
- Location of the canal
- Country: Netherlands

Specifications
- Length: 65 km (40 miles)

Geography
- Direction: East; Northeast
- Start point: Ijssel River
- End point: Enschede; Almelo
- Beginning coordinates: 52.168°N 6.192°E
- Ending coordinates: 52.222°N 6.857°E; 52.370°N 6.636°E

The Twentekanaal (Dutch pronunciation: [ˈtʋɛntəkaːˌnaːl]) is a canal running through the Dutch provinces of Gelderland and Overijssel, connecting the three largest cities of the Twente region, Almelo, Hengelo and Enschede to the national network of rivers and canals. Because the canal forks to reach Almelo, the canal is officially plural, which is Twentekanalen.

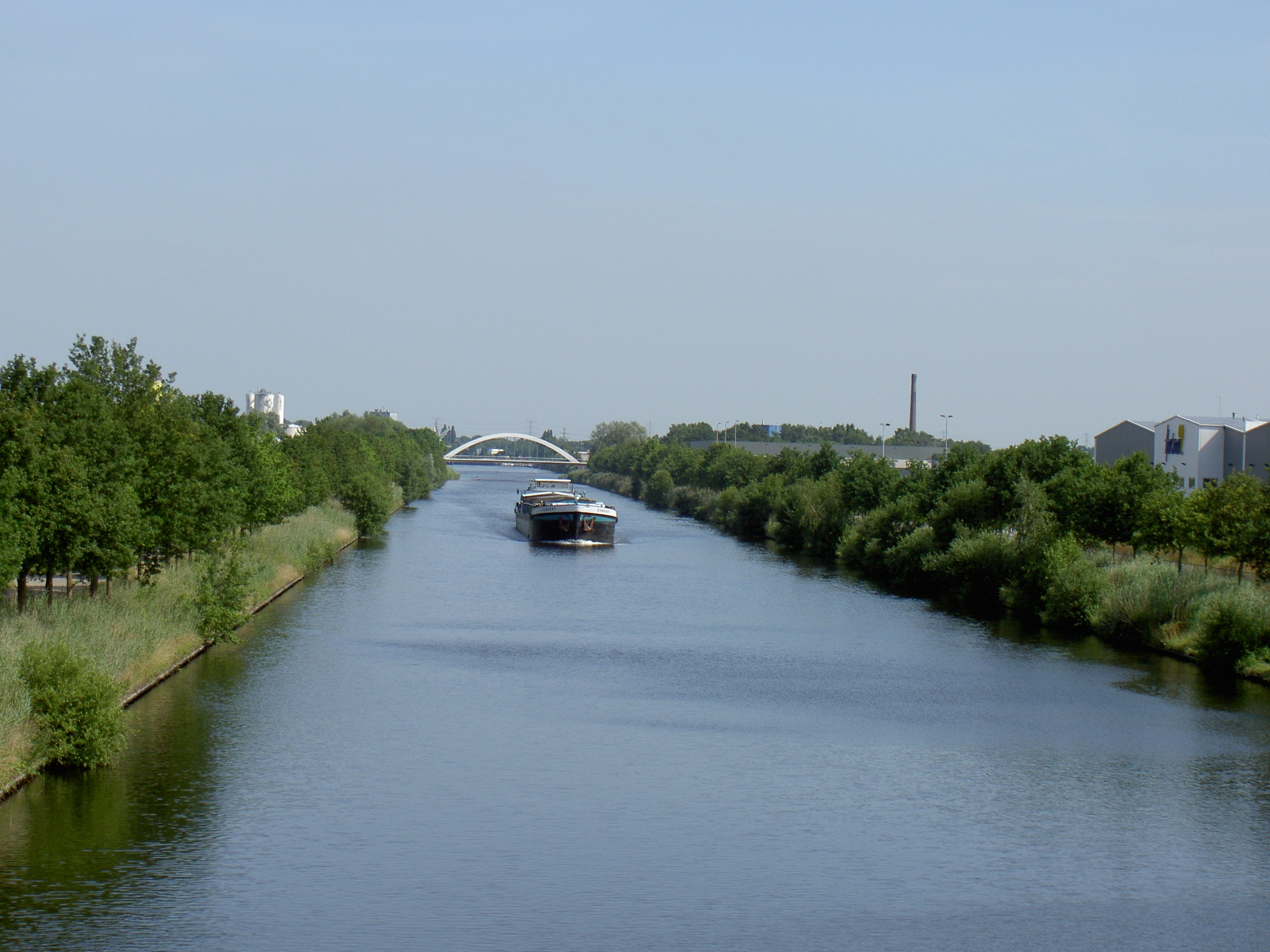
Twentekanaal in Enschede

The Twentekanaal starts at the IJssel North of Zutphen at the village of Eefde and runs through Almen, Lochem, Goor, Delden and Hengelo to Enschede. West of Delden, a fork of the canal runs to Almelo.

Both canals (Zutphen–Enschede and the fork Delden–Almelo) are managed by Rijkswaterstaat (the Dutch government body responsible for waterways). The part of the canal Eefde–Delden is 33 kilometres long, the fork Delden–Almelo is 15 kilometres long and the parts of the canal Delden–Hengelo and Hengelo–Enschede are subsequently 9 and 5 kilometres long. The total length of the canal is 65 kilometres.

== History ==
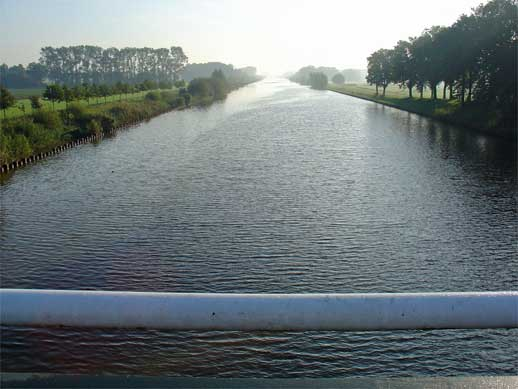
Twentekanaal at the Dochterense bridge in the vicinity of Lochem

Although the first plan for a canal to Twente dates back to the middle of the 19th century, construction did not start until 1930, after a quarrel of nearly a quarter of a century about eight subjects. The canal was constructed to secure a better supply of raw materials for the textile industry (rough cotton) and for the supply of coal from the mines in Limburg. Most of the canal was constructed as a job project for unemployed workers during the crisis. The canal was largely dug by hand. In 1938 the canal was completed. In 1953 the canal was extended and the fork was constructed, connecting the harbour of Almelo and the Kanaal Almelo-De Haandrik to the Twentekanaal.

Until 2003 the channel water was pumped into the ground and filtered by sand and gravel; the drinking water produced this way provided 80% of the drinking water needs of Enschede. Due to a large fire at Vredestein in Enschede the channel section was closed for weeks to prevent spreading pollution. Research by water company Vitens in February 2008 showed that the water from the Twentekanaal is no longer safe to drink.

The Twentekanaal has been widened and deepened from a CEMT-class IV to a CEMT-class Va waterway between 2004 and 2007. This means that a big Rhine ship (max. 11.50 wide, a draught of 2.70 and a length of 110 metres) can use the canal. The depth of the fairway is specified at 5 meter, however the threshold depth at the all locks is specified at 3,75 meter below channel level.

Simultaneously with the excavation to a greater depth, the canal was also widened locally. So between Goor and Delden width increases from 40 to 51 meters. Herewith so-called 'natural banks' were also immediately constructed. This offers, for example, water hit deer a possibility to leave the canal. There are also suitable spawning grounds for fish. The sand that was excavated was reused directly by Rijkswaterstaat in the construction of a new section of motorway in Almelo, and boulders founded in the widening surfaced were used again in the construction of the bottom and banks.

A study related to the history of the canal speaks of "a success out of a failure": the economic development as a result of the construction of the canal has been a disappointment, but the canal has had a huge impact on water management.

== Current function ==
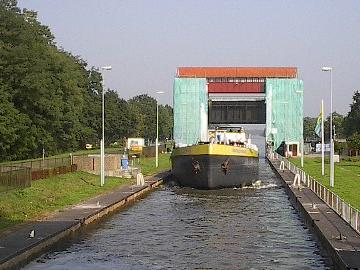
The Canal Lock at Eefde

Nowadays the canal is used for the transport of sand, gravel, salt and cattle food. In 1996 432,277 ton was loaded and unloaded in Enschede and in 2,322,270 ton in Hengelo. Furthermore, the canal has a recreational function for both sailing and fishing, drainage and the drinking water supply of Enschede. The drinking water is produced by pumping the water out of the canal at Lonnekerbrug.

For the draining purposes of all the streams connected to the canal, the Pumping station in Delden and Eefde are capable of pumping the water out of the canal. The canal is capable of handling 190,000 litres of water per second.

On the part of the canal from Hengelo to Enschede much training of professional rowers takes place. As a result of a few serious accidents between Cargo ships and skiffs a learning and exchange project was started to generate mutual respect and understanding between these two groups. For the professional shipping, all locks have been equipped with warning signs to remind them of the recreational shipping, while the rowers were invited to take a look at the bridge of a cargo ship and experience the controls of these ships.

There are plans to connect the channel to the Mittelland Canal to shorten the connection from the Port of Rotterdam towards northern Germany.

== Locks ==
The total height difference between Zutphen and Enschede is 21 metres. To bridge this difference, the Twentekanaal has three locks. The lock at Eefde bridges approximately 6 meters, depending on the water level in the IJssel. The lock at Delden also bridges 6 meters and the lock at Hengelo 9 meters. There are no locks in the fork to Almelo.

Because the locks have to bridge a lot, much water is wasted. To compensate this, every lock has a Pumping station.

== Characteristics ==
- Length = 65 km
- Shipping class = Va (until 2007: IV)
- Year operational = 1938 (connected to Almelo harbor in 1953)
- Runs from Almelo/Enschede to the river IJssel
- Runs through the provinces of Overijssel and Gelderland in The Netherlands
