= The Upstairs Room =

1972 Holocaust survivor autobiography by Johanna Reiss

- Author: Johanna Reiss
- Language: English
- Genre: Young adult literature
- Publisher: Thomas Y. Crowell Co.
- Publication date: 1972
- Media type: Print (Hardback & Paperback)
- Pages: 196
- ISBN: 978-0-690-85127-4

The Upstairs Room is a 1972 Holocaust survivor autobiography by Johanna Reiss documenting her childhood in occupied Holland during the Nazi invasion.

== Summary ==
Reiss is known as Annie de Leeuw during the period in this book. The story begins in the year 1938. Annie belongs to a Jewish family and has two sisters, Rachel and Sini. Now, the Holocaust has started so they have nowhere to go. Her family is in grave danger. In the story, Annie and her elder sister Sini are separated from their family. They struggle through many hardships, such as their mother's illness and eventual death. They keep moving from one family to another so that they are not caught by the Nazis. Annie and Sini get separated from their home and family. Her mother then dies because of very bad headaches. Annie and Sini are taken to the Oostervelds and their sister Rachel is taken in with a priest.

== Reception ==
Elie Wiesel reviewed the book shortly after its publication. He wrote in part, "This admirable account is as important in every aspect as the one bequeathed to us by Anne Frank. Annie's ambivalent relationships with her father, her sister, the family that sheltered her, her discovery of concentration camp horror – we laugh with her and cry with her. With her we await D-Day and liberation, sharing her anxieties and her dreams. In the end, we are grateful to fate for having spared a child who can reminisce with neither hate nor bitterness but a kind of gentleness that leaves us with a lump in our throats."

The book won many awards including a 1973 Newbery Honor and the 1973 National Jewish Book Award for best children's book.

A 2009 The New York Times article noted about the book: "Compared with Anne Frank’s Diary of a Young Girl, it is sparer and sterner: Frank, unaware of her tragic fate, radiated lively, optimistic, girlish intensity, while Reiss wrote 'The Upstairs Room' after much of her hope and appetite for life had been extinguished. One expects the survivor to be the more expansive writer, but like so many Holocaust victims, Reiss was left emotionally crippled, fearful of being violently murdered, always ready to hide."
