= Almelo =

- City and municipality
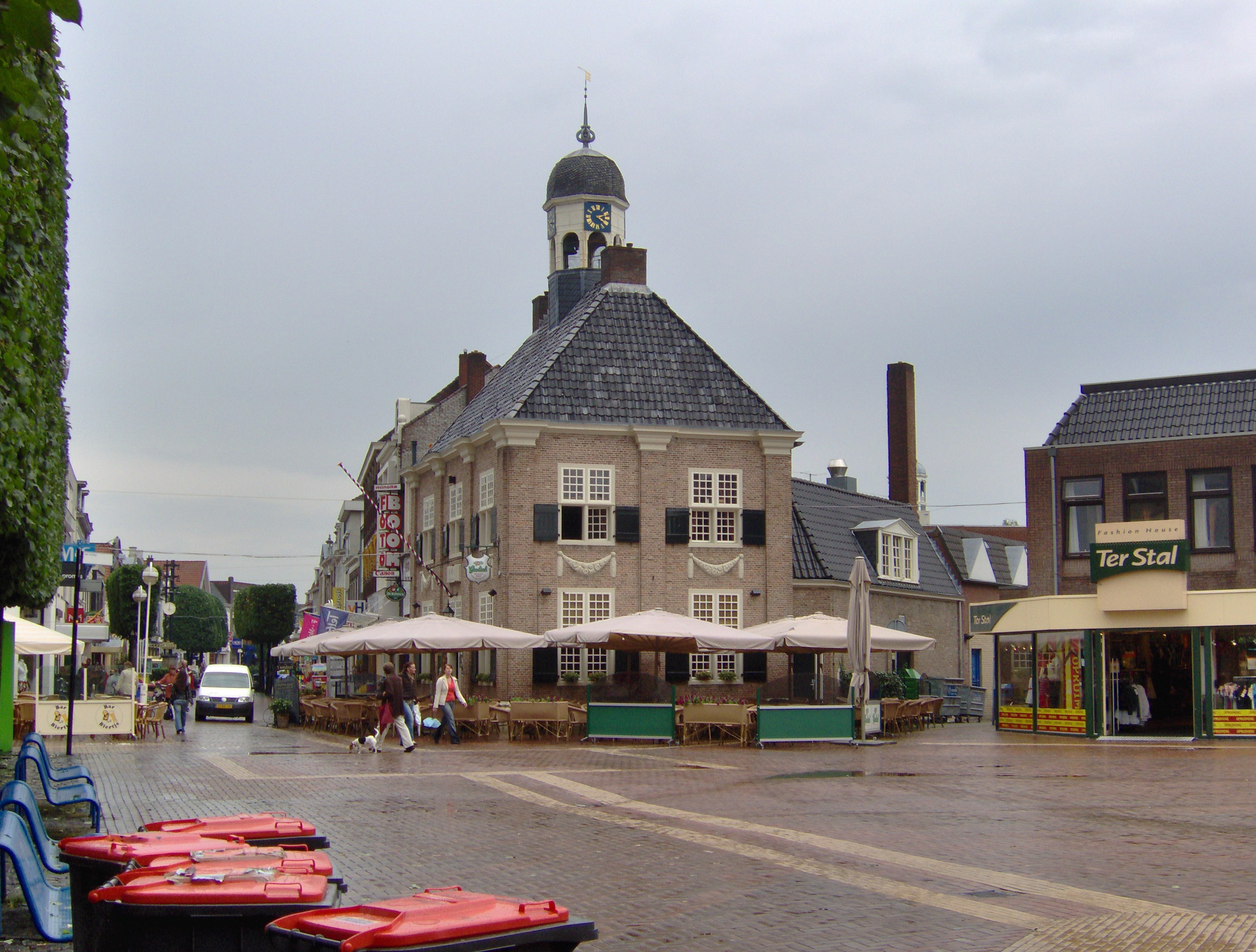
- Almelo city centre

- Flag Coat of arms

- Location in Overijssel

- Location within the Netherlands Location within Europe
- Coordinates: 52°21′N 6°40′E
- Country: Netherlands
- Province: Overijssel

Government
  - Body: Municipal council
  - Mayor: Richard Korteland (VVD)

Area
  - Total: 69.41 km^{2} (26.80 sq mi)
  - Land: 67.27 km^{2} (25.97 sq mi)
  - Water: 2.14 km^{2} (0.83 sq mi)
- Elevation: 12 m (39 ft)

Population (January 2021)
  - Total: 73,132
  - Density: 1,087/km^{2} (2,820/sq mi)
- Demonym: Almeloër
- Time zone: UTC+1 (CET)
  - Summer (DST): UTC+2 (CEST)
- Postcode: 7600–7614, 7627
- Area code: 0546
- Website: www.almelo.nl

Almelo (Dutch pronunciation: [ˈɑlməloː]) is a municipality and a city in the eastern Netherlands. The main population centres are Almelo itself and the villages of Aadorp, Mariaparochie, and Bornerbroek. Almelo has about 75,000 inhabitants in the middle of the rolling countryside of Twente, with the industrial centres of Enschede and Hengelo as close neighbours but also with tourist towns like Ootmarsum, Delden and Markelo only a bicycle ride away.

Almelo received city rights in 1394. Within the city limits lies the castle of the Counts of Almelo. Located in the city centre is Huize Almelo, a castle that in its current form dates back to 1662 but is not open to the public.

The city is also known for its local association football club Heracles Almelo, which plays in the Eredivisie, the highest football league in the Netherlands, and uses the Erve Asito stadium. Some of the Almelo population speak the Tweants dialect.

== History ==
The name Almelo comes from the Germanic words alma (which means elm) and lauha.

The city had a moat, but no walls, and therefore never held any military significance. Huis Almelo (Almelo House) likely existed since the 12th century and remains in the hands of the Van Rechteren Limpurg family to this day. For centuries, the family held various rights in the city of Almelo, including the right to administer justice.

After the then lord of Almelo, Zeger van Rechteren (1623-1674) banned the practice of Catholicism in 1664, the nuns of the St. Catherine Monastery in Almelo left in 1665 and settled 300 meters across the German border, just southwest of Glane in the Netherlands, in a monastery they named Maria Vlucht (Maria Flight). After the monastery was closed, the church treasures were dispersed throughout the region.

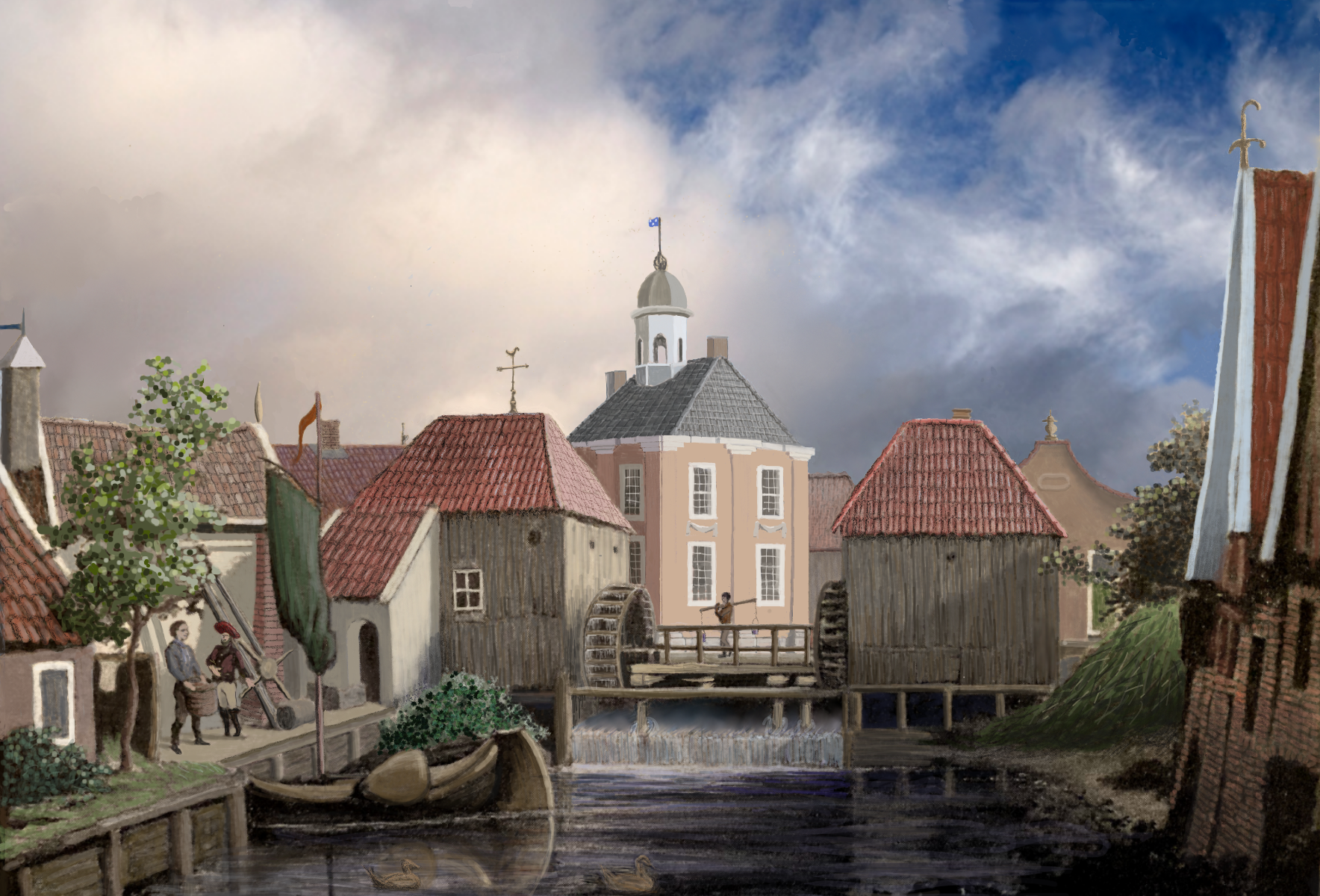
Deze watermolens hebben tot halverwege de 19e eeuw het beeld bepaald op de Koornmarkt in Almelo.

At the end of the 19th century, textile emerged as a major employer and drew many workers to Almelo, at first from within the Netherlands.

The municipality of Almelo was formed from a merger (1914) between the municipalities of Ambt Almelo and Stad Almelo.

=== World War II ===
During World War II, Almelo was one of the locations where the Twente raid took place in September 1941. Ten Jewish men were arrested in Almelo and perished in the Mauthausen concentration camp. A monument commemorating the 242 Jews from Almelo who died, as well as those who hid them, stands in the Almelo Jewish cemetery.

On 15 November 1944, eight resistance fighters against the Reichskommissariat Niederlande regime robbed the De Nederlandsche Bank (Dutch Central Bank) on Wierdensestraat. The loot amounted to 46.1 million guilders, the largest haul ever during a robbery in the Netherlands.

=== After war ===
Since the 1960s workers from Spain and Turkey came to Almelo. The first mosque of the Netherlands was built in Almelo in 1976 for the Turkish population of the city. Almelo also has a sizeable number of Armenians who built their own Armenian Apostolic Church in 2003.

In the 1970s the industry dwindled and most factories were relocated to countries with cheaper labour. Some factories remain in the city centre and are now in use for apartments or offices.

== Geography ==
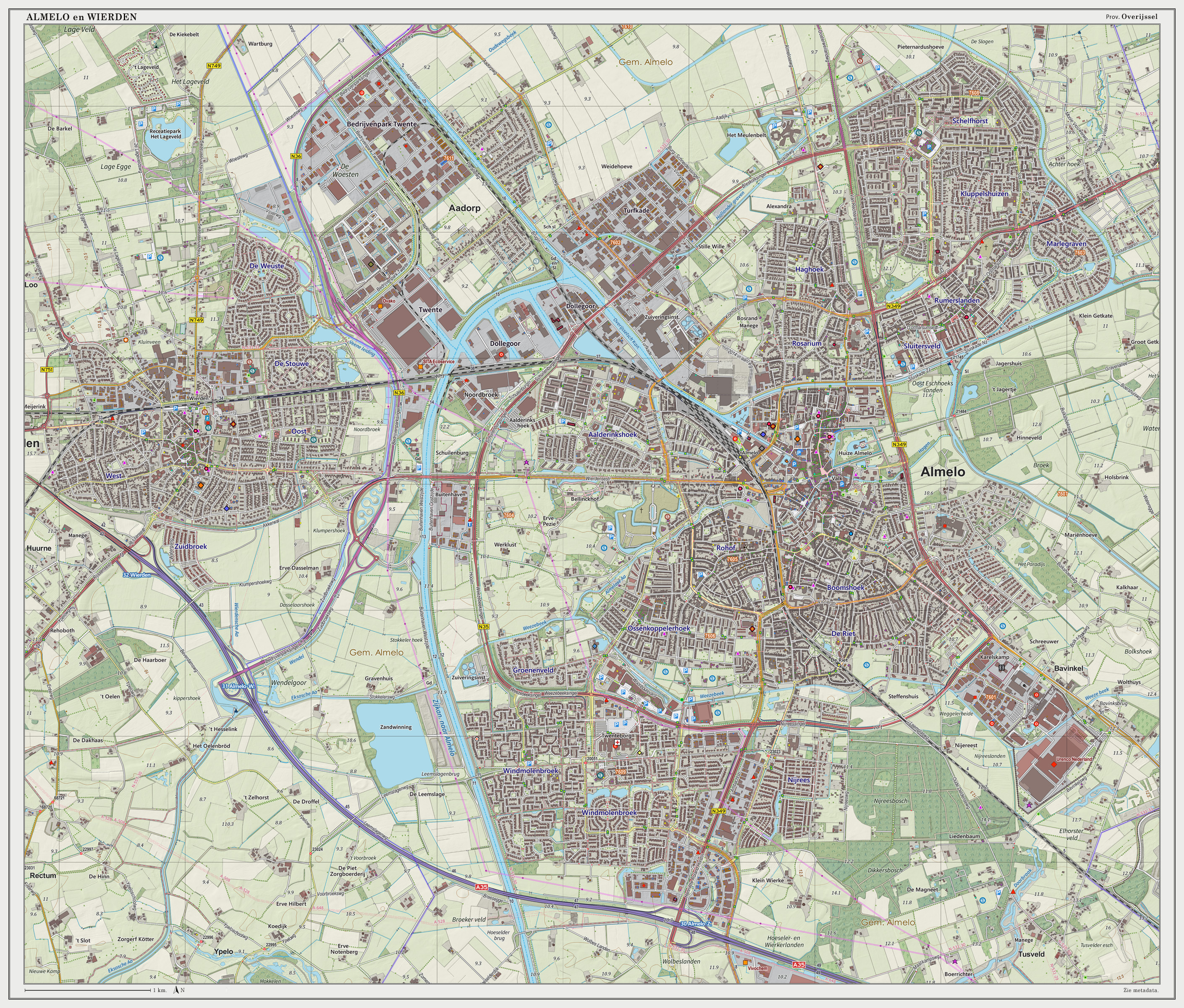
Topographic map of Almelo, Sept. 2014

== Economy ==
Currently, a major employer in Almelo is Urenco Nederland. This is a uranium enrichment plant which uses the gas centrifuge method and produces uranium with about five percent U-235, for nuclear reactors. An industrial bakery, Bolletje, Malvern Panalytical, the Stichting Ziekenhuisgroep Twente (a hospital) and the regional court are also major employers.

== Demographics ==
As of 2020, Almelo has a total population of about 73,107. The city has a significant Armenian population.

2020	Numbers	%
Dutch natives	53,866	73.6%
Western migration background	7,620	10.4%
Non-Western migration background	11,621	15.9%
Armenia	~7,000	10%
Turkey	5,797	8%
Indonesia	2,240	3.06%
Morocco	565	
Netherlands Antilles and Aruba	362	
Suriname	340	
Total	73,107	100%

== Transport ==
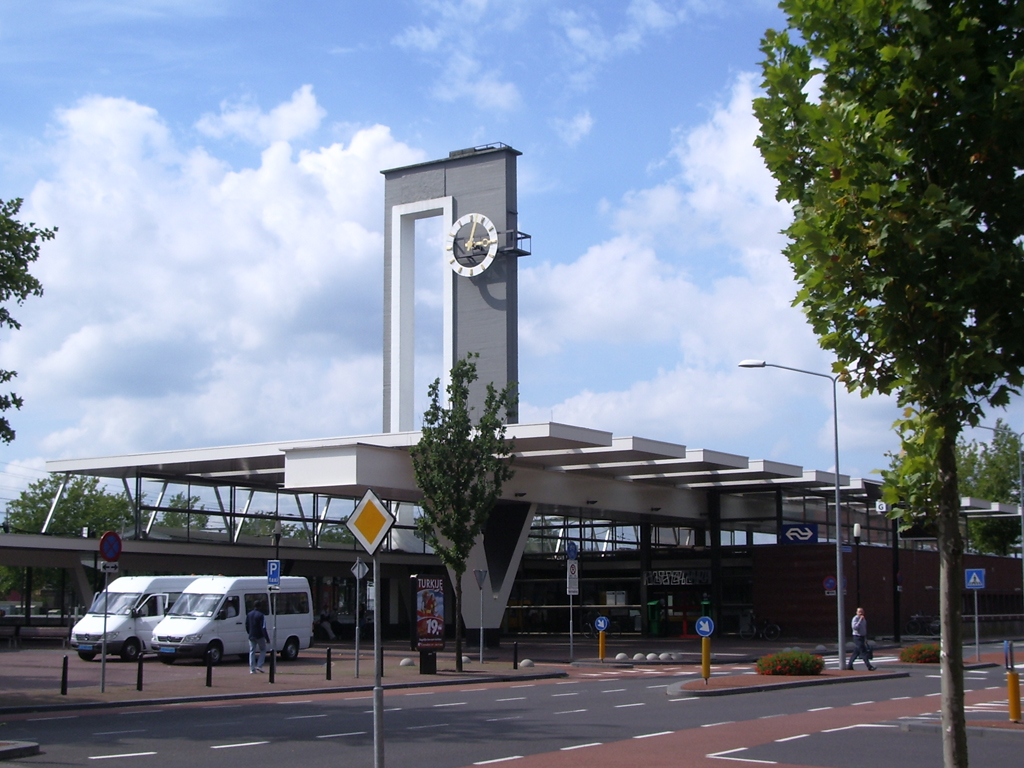
Almelo station

Almelo has 2 railway stations:

- Almelo railway station
- Almelo de Riet railway station

The main station is Almelo and offers links to Hengelo, Enschede, Amersfoort, Amsterdam Airport Schiphol, Utrecht, Gouda, Rotterdam, The Hague and Zwolle. There is also a train every 2 hours into Germany serving cities such as Osnabrück, Hannover and Berlin.

There are mosaics which decorate the walls of the tunnel close to the railway station.

== Sports ==
=== Football ===
Heracles Almelo, a professional football club playing in the Eredivisie is based in Almelo.

=== Cycling ===
Since 1983 Almelo has organised the Profronde van Almelo, an elite men's and women's professional road bicycle racing event.

== Notable people ==
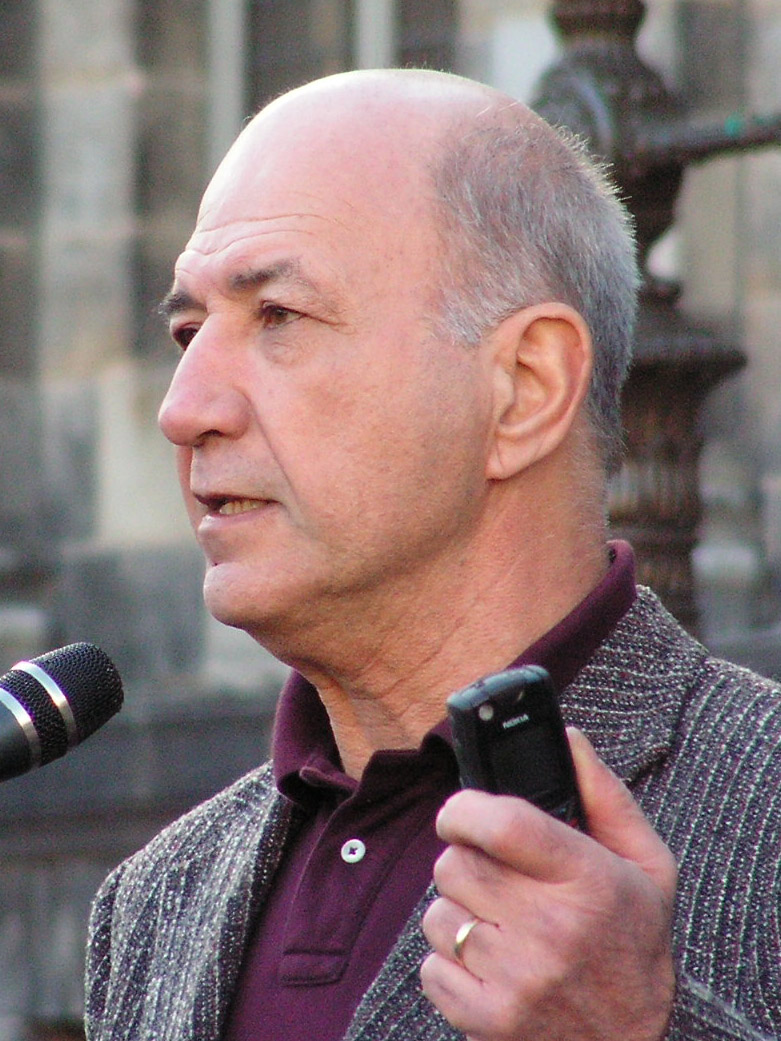
Wubbo Ockels, 2007

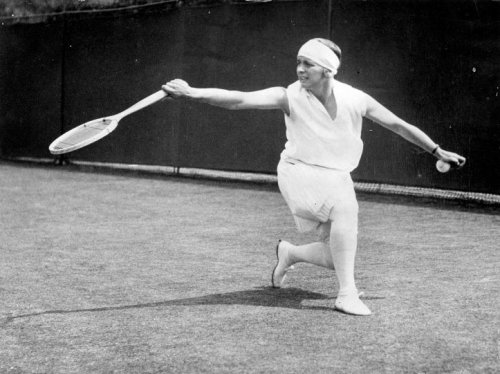
Kea Bouman, 1929

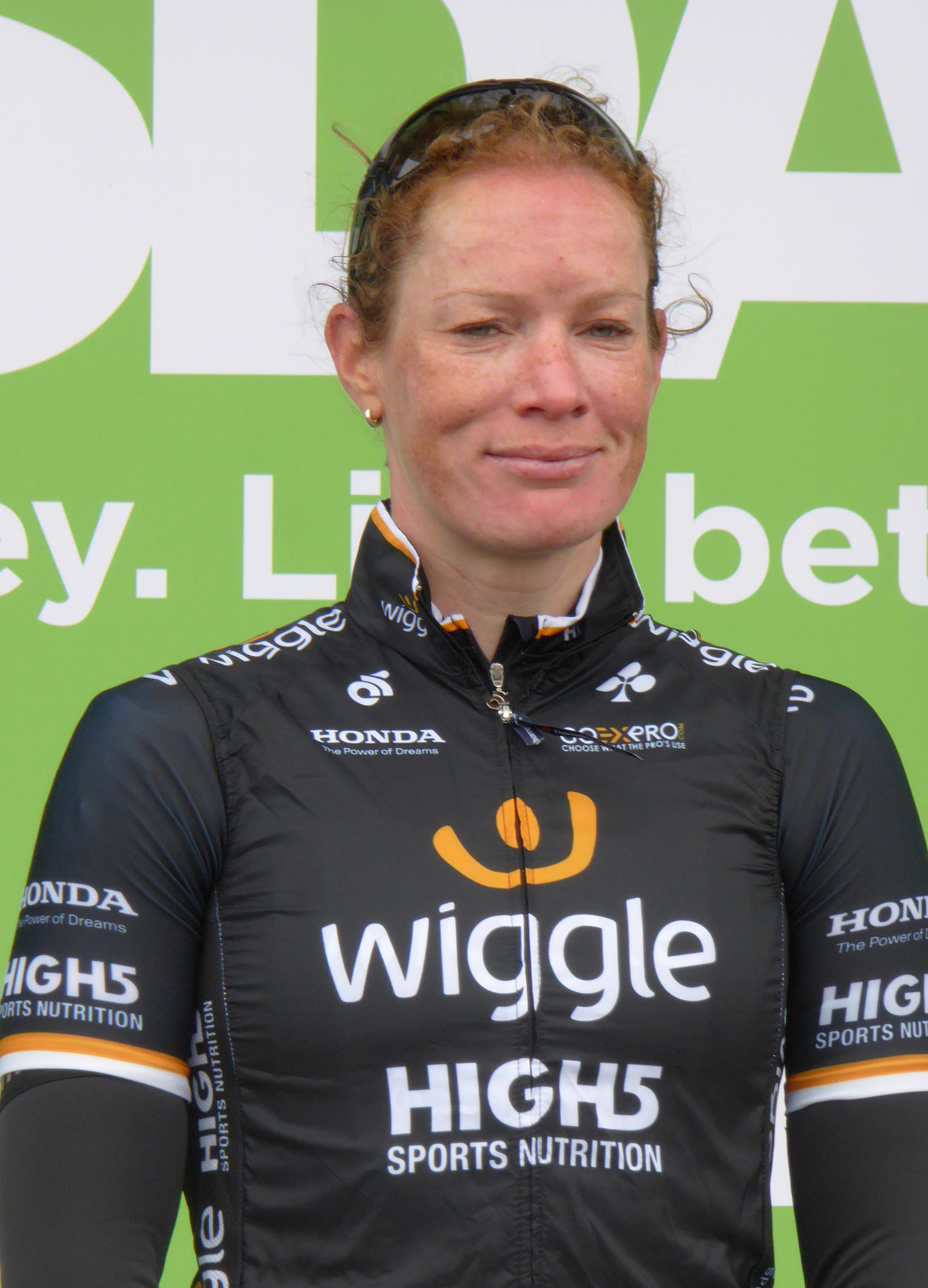
Kirsten Wild, 2018

- Catharina Julia Roeters van Lennep (1813–1883) a Dutch artist
- Bertha Tideman-Wijers (1887–1976) composer
- Izaak Kolthoff (1894–1993) an analytical chemist and chemistry educator
- Judith Ledeboer OBE (1901–1990) architect
- Evert Willem Beth (1908–1964) philosopher and logician
- Gerritdina Benders-Letteboer (1909–1980) an active member of the Dutch Resistance
- Wubbo Ockels (1946–2014) a physicist and astronaut of the European Space Agency
- Herman Finkers (born 1954) comedian
- Tom Egbers (born 1957) a Dutch English journalist, writer and TV presenter
- Liesbeth van Tongeren (born 1958) a Dutch politician, Director of Greenpeace Netherlands 2003–2010, grew up in Almelo
- Hero Brinkman (born 1964) a police officer and former Dutch politician
- Jos de Blok (born 1960) founder and CEO of Buurtzorg
- Michiel Veenstra (born 1976) Radio DJ on KINK
- Ilse de Lange (born 1977) a Dutch country and pop rock singer-songwriter
- Loes Haverkort (born 1981) a Dutch film, TV and theater actress
- Azra Akın (born 1981) Miss Turkey World 2002 and Miss World 2002

=== Sports ===
- Kea Bouman (1903 – 1998) female tennis player; only Dutch female tennis player to win a Grand Slam singles tournament
- Lex Mullink (born 1944) a retired rower, bronze medallist at the 1964 Summer Olympics
- Hendrie Krüzen (born 1964) football midfielder, over 500 club caps
- Brian van Loo (born 1975) retired soccer goalkeeper, 261 club caps
- Marnix Smit (born 1975) retired soccer player, 231 club caps with Heracles Almelo
- Arnold Bruggink (born 1977) retired soccer player, 447 club caps
- Mark Looms (born 1981) soccer player, 329 club caps
- Kirsten Wild (born 1982) track and road race cyclist; multiple National Champion
- Marc Höcher (born 1984) a Dutch football player with over 350 club caps
- Dennis Kuipers (born 1985) a Dutch rally driver
- Anouk Dekker (born 1986) a Dutch footballer with over 250 club caps
- Maret Balkestein-Grothues (born 1988) a Dutch volleyball player
- Maud Roetgering (born 1992) a football defender 184 caps with FC Twente Vrouwen
- Bent Viscaal (born 1999) a Dutch racing driver

== International relations ==
=== Twin towns — Sister cities ===
Almelo is twinned with:

Iserlohn, Germany	Preston, United Kingdom	Vagharshapat, Armenia	(Turkey); Denizli, Turkey

== See also ==
- Ambt Almelo

== Gallery ==
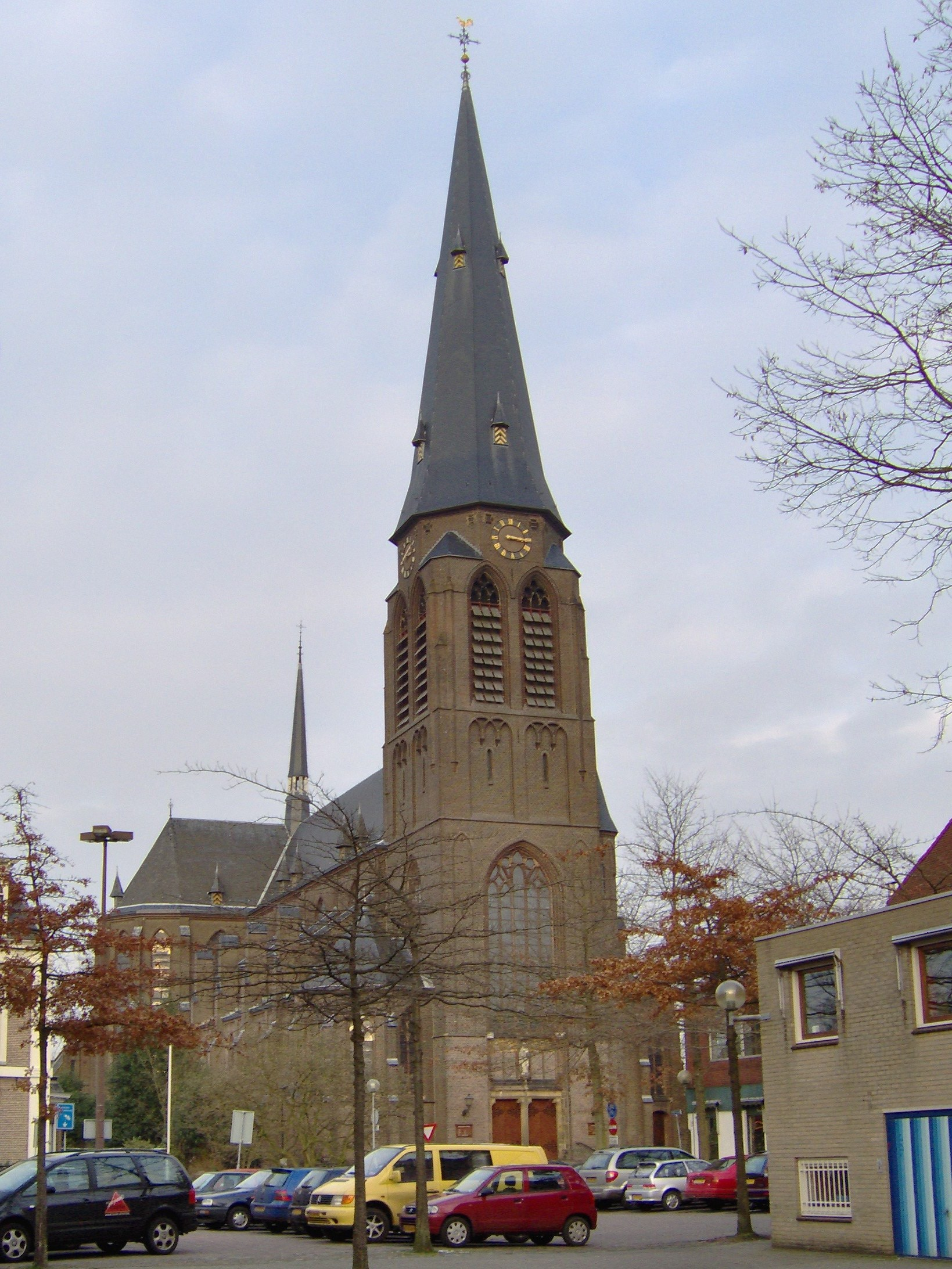
The Catholic St. Georgius church in Almelo

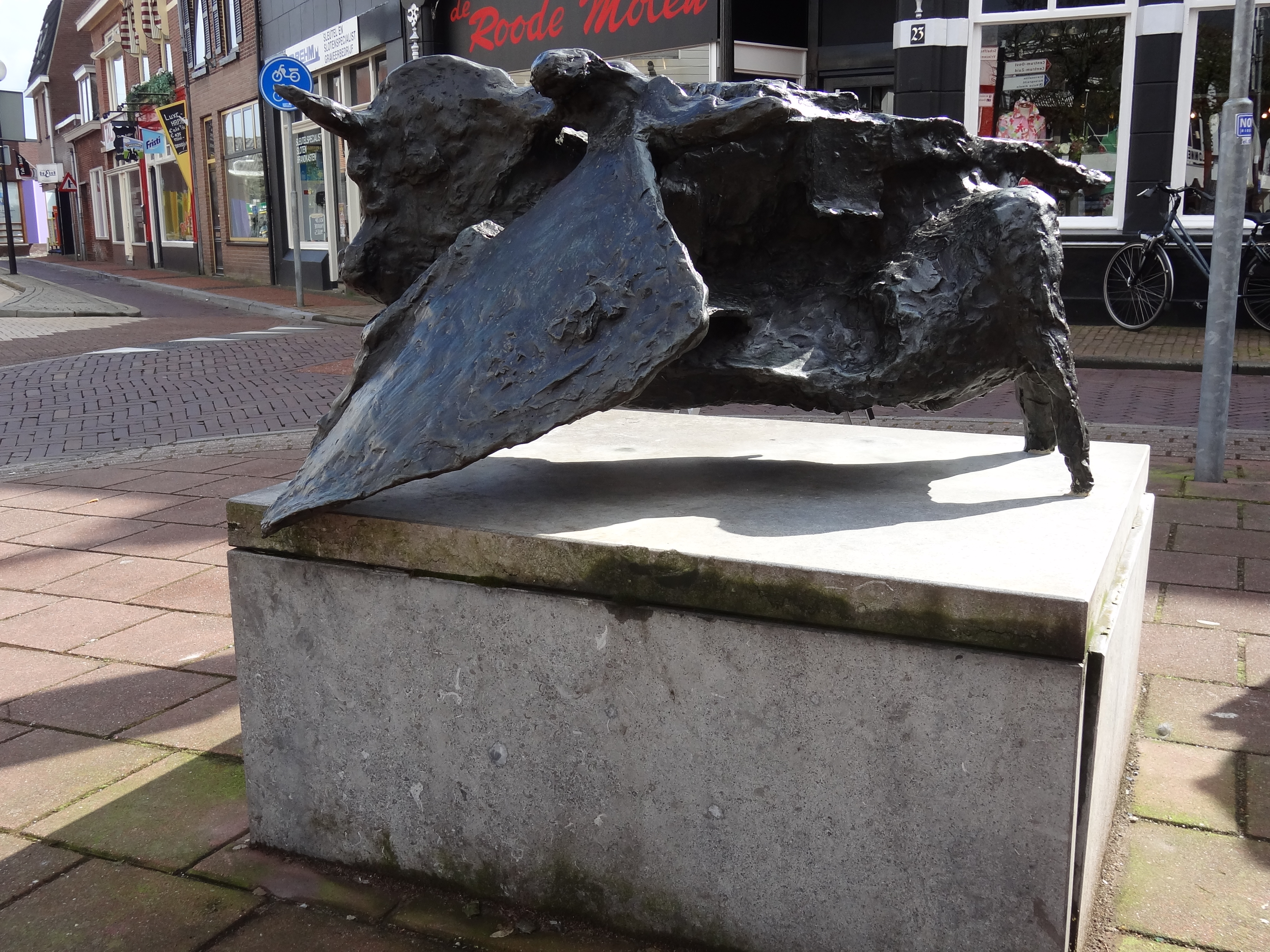
Almelo - Sculptuur op de hoek van de Oranjestraat en de Molenstraat

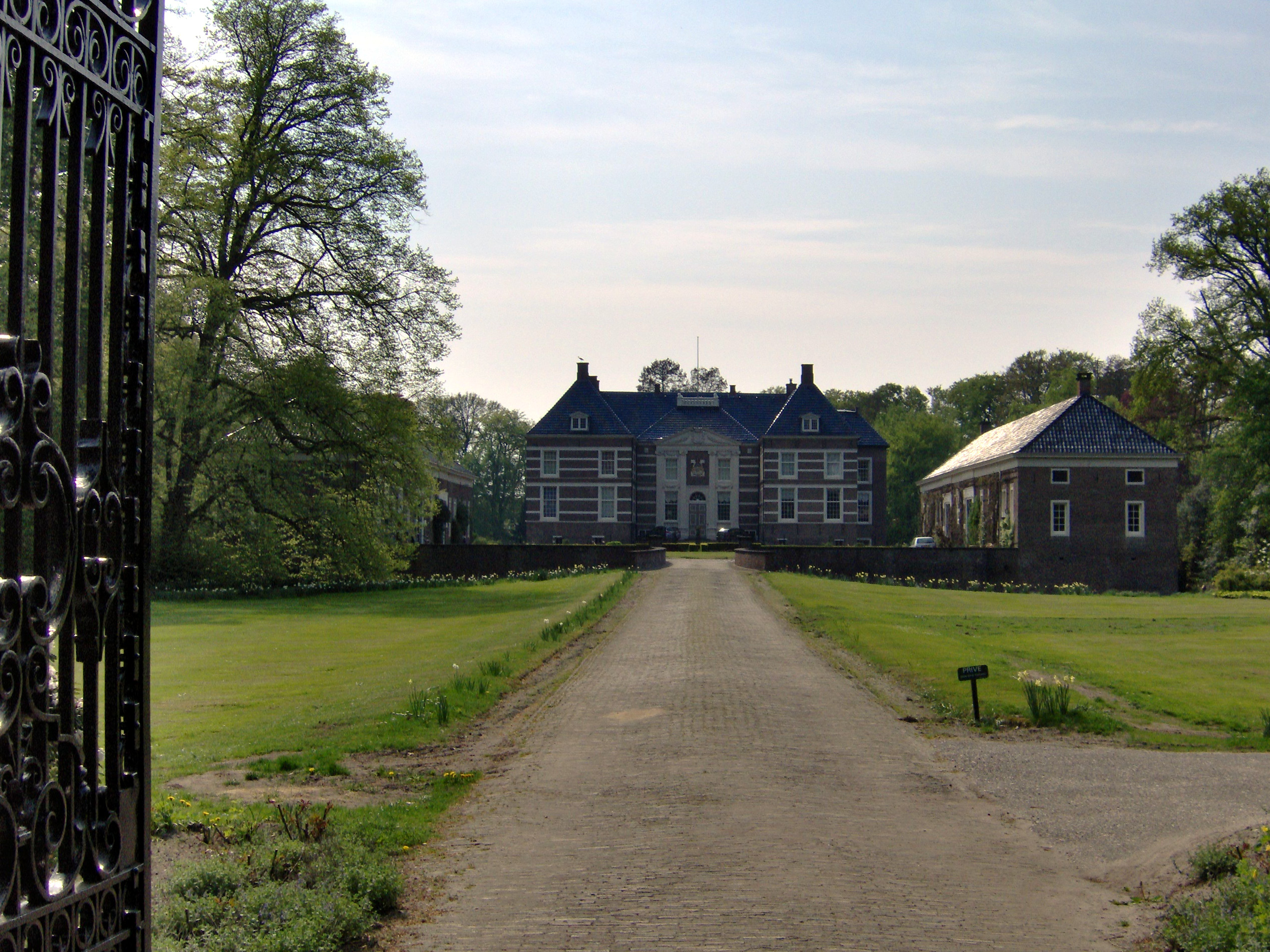
Huize Almelo

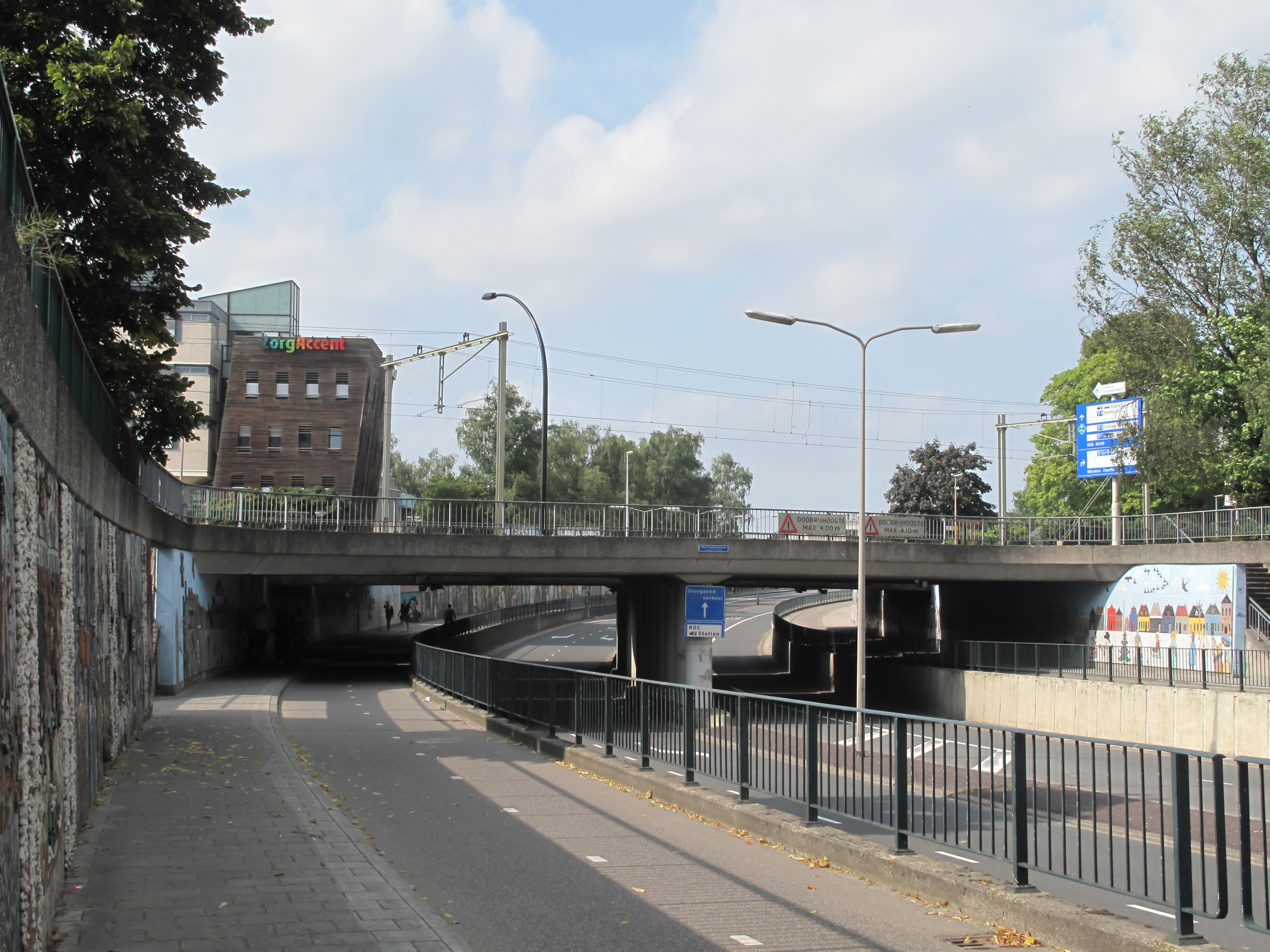
Almelo, spoorviadukt bij de Wierdensestraat

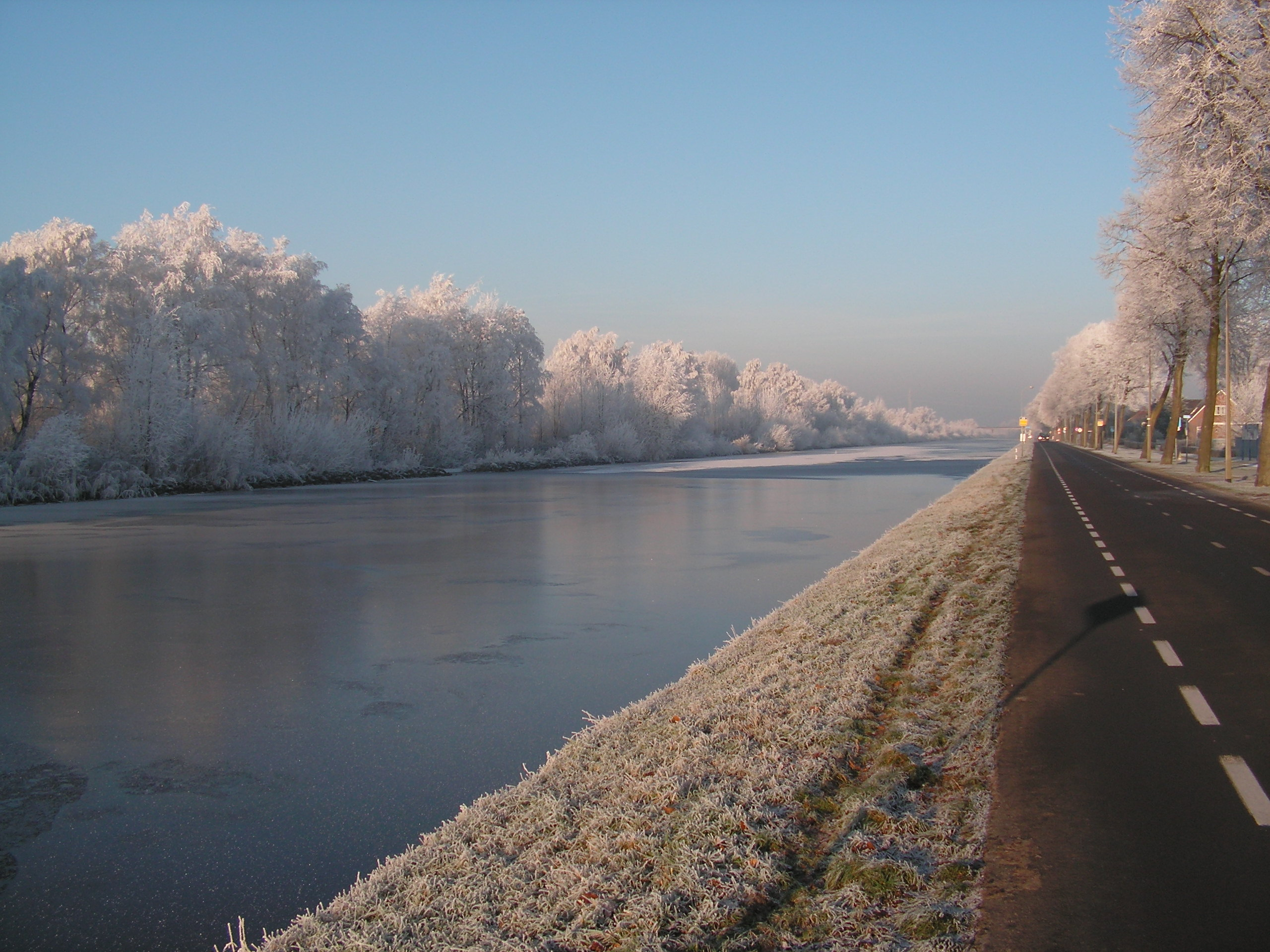
Afbeelding

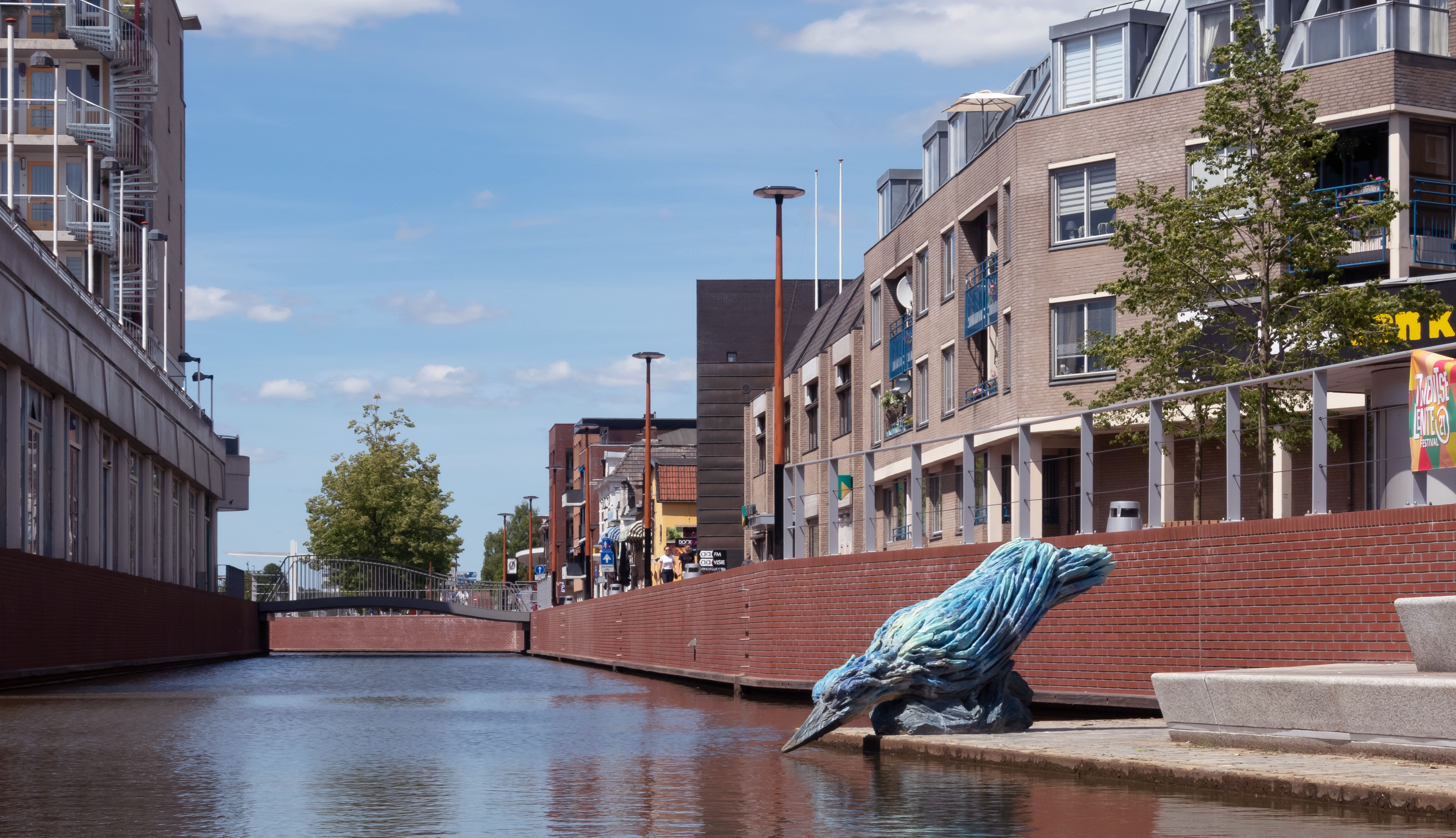
Bird sculpture by artist Anne Wenzel at the Marktplein

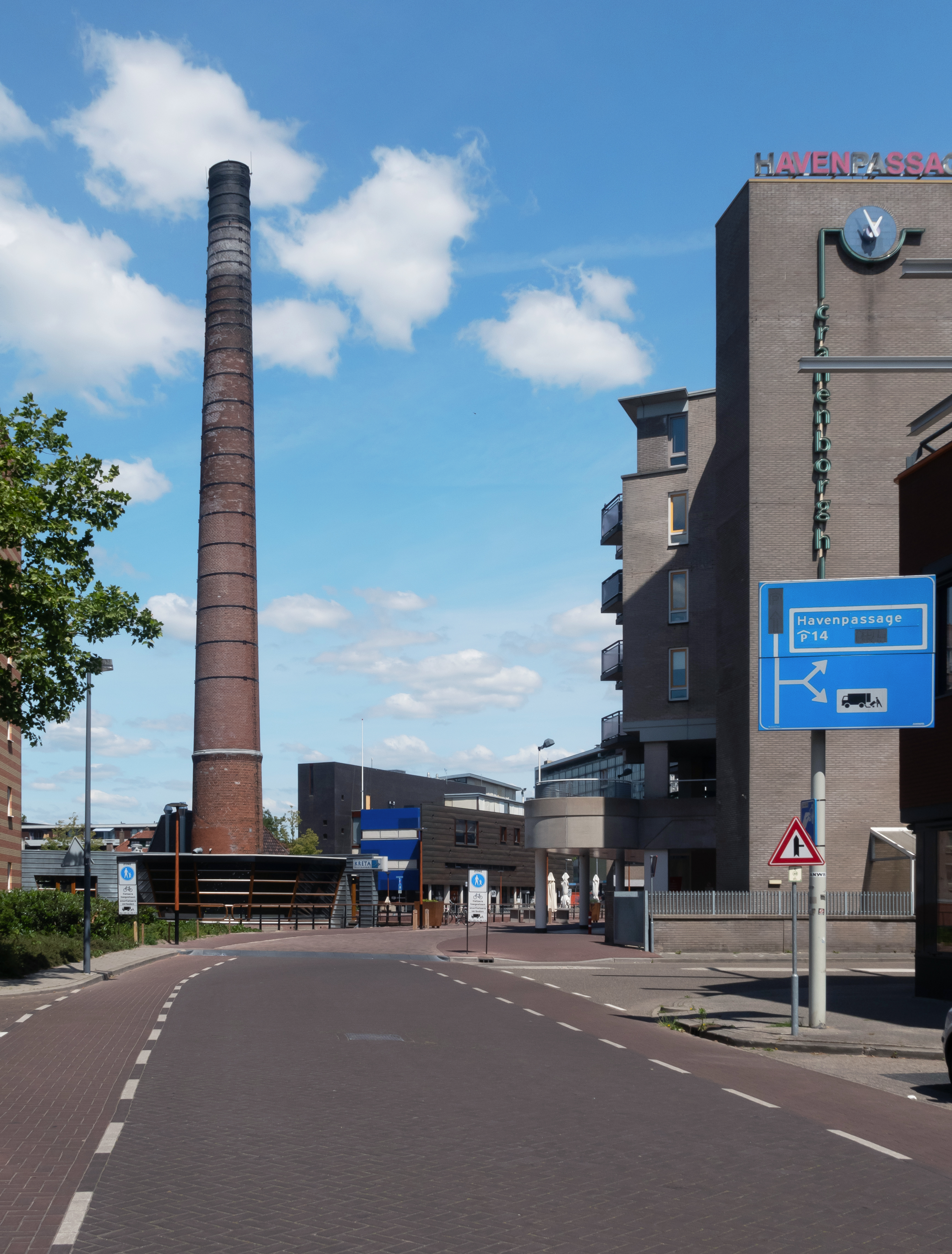
Restaurant in former factory

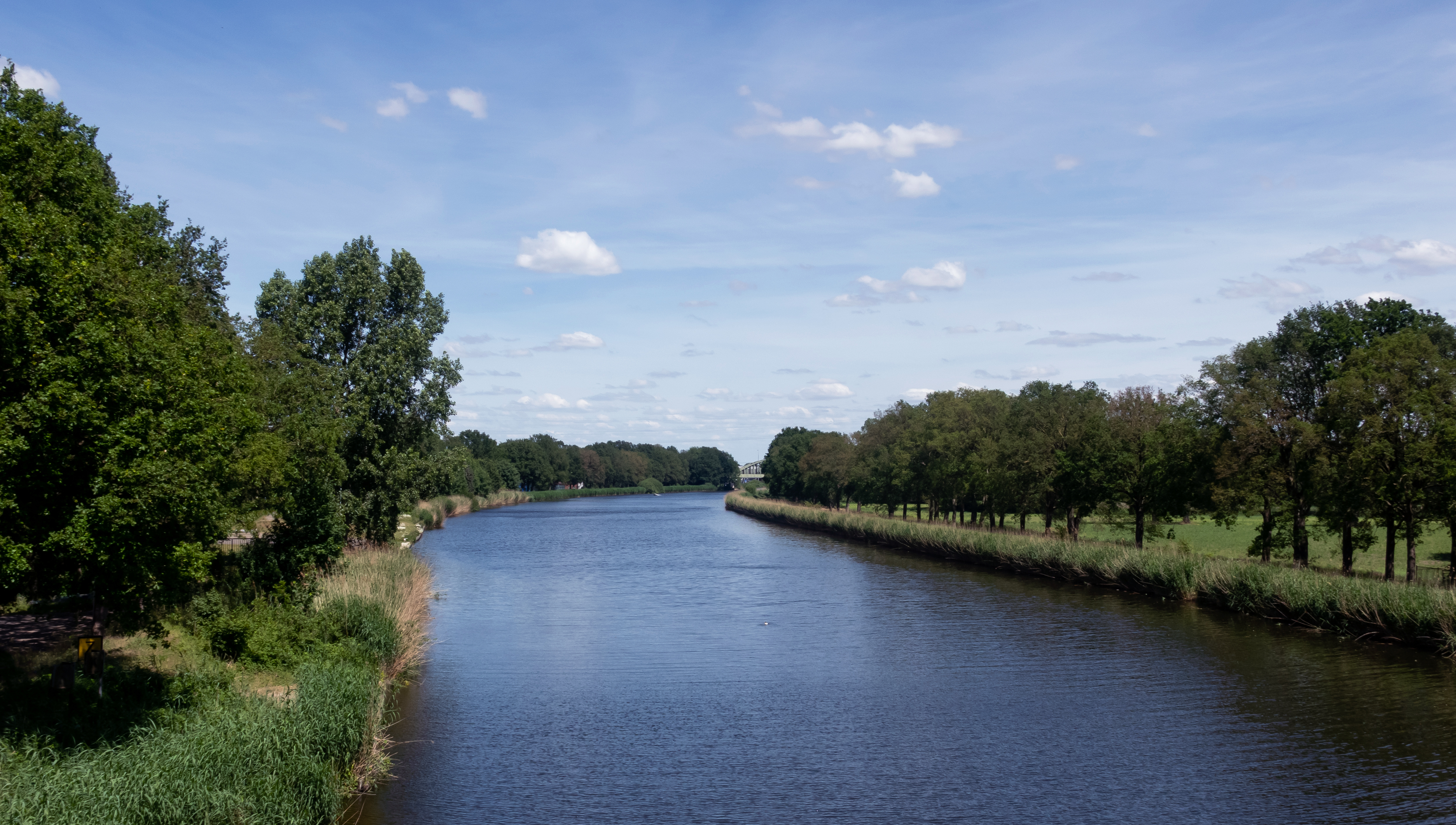
Twentekanaal (branch to Almelo)
