= List of works by Thérèse Schwartze =

The following is a list of works by Thérèse Schwartze that are generally accepted as autograph by the Cora Hollema catalog and other sources.

| Image | Title | Year | Dimensions | Inventory nr. | Gallery | Location |
|---|---|---|---|---|---|---|
| | Queen Emma with Princess Wilhelmina on her arm | 1881 | 146 cm x 98 cm | SC/0399 | Collection House of Orange | Het Loo Palace |
| | Portrait of Catharina Josephina den Tex-Biben | 1882 | 142 cm x 89 cm | SA 40872 | Amsterdam Museum | Amsterdam |
| | Portrait of Catharina Julia Roeters van Lennep | 1883 | | | Private collection | |
| | Portrait of Wally Moes | 1884 | 75 cm x 59 cm | | Singer Laren | Laren |
| | Un Regard | ca.1884 | 46 cm x 38 cm | | private collection | |
| | Young Italian woman with the dog Puck | ca.1884 | 144 cm x 103 cm | | Rijksmuseum | Amsterdam |
| | Portrait of Aletta Anna Reiniera Ansingh | 1884 | 50 cm x 40 cm | | private collection | |
| | Three girls in the Amsterdam Orphanage | 1885 | 81.5 cm × 96 cm | SK-A-1190 | Rijksmuseum | Amsterdam |
| | A woman with her three children at church | 1886 | | | Montreal Museum of Fine Arts | Montreal |
| | School time | 1886 | 24 cm x 22.5 cm | | private collection | |
| | Poor Yet Rich | 1887 | 160 cm x 110 cm | | private collection | |
| | Portrait of Johanna Eugenia Theadora Van Hoorn-Schouwenburg | 1887 | 63 cm x 47.5 cm | | Amsterdam Museum | Amsterdam |
| | Portrait of Pierre J.H. Cuypers at age 60 | 1887 | 120 cm x 95 cm | | Rijksmuseum | Amsterdam |
| | Portrait of Princess Wilhelmina | 1888 | 60 cm x 50 cm | | Collection House of Orange | |
| | Self-portrait | 1888 | 129 cm x 88 cm | | Uffizi Gallery | Florence |
| | Portrait of Petrus Jacobus Joubert - Commander-General of the South African Republic | 1890 | 125 cm x 89 cm | SK-C-745 | Rijksmuseum | Amsterdam |
| | Portrait of Sophia Adriana de Bruijn (1816-1890) | 1890 | | SA 475 | Amsterdam Museum | Amsterdam |
| | Portrait of Marie Henriette Dubourcq-Rochussen | 1891 | 73 cm x 55 cm | | private collection | |
| | Portrait of Amber | 1892 | 41 cm x 41 cm | | private collection | |
| | Group portrait of Lutheran initiates | 1894 | 185 cm x 274 cm | A 384 | Stedelijk Museum | Amsterdam |
| | Portrait of Lizzy Ansingh | 1895 | 56 cm x 47 cm | A 2326 | Stedelijk Museum | Amsterdam |
| | Portrait of Abraham Carel Wertheim | 1896 | 103 cm x 83.5 cm | | Jewish Historical Museum | Amsterdam |
| | Queen Wilhelmina in coronation robes | 1898 | 202 cm x 136 cm | | Palace Het Loo | Apeldoorn |
| | Portrait of Paul Joseph Constantin Gabriël | 1899 | 76 cm x 46 cm | SK-A-3054 | Rijksmuseum | Amsterdam |
| | Portrait of Frederik Willem van Eeden (biologist) | 1899 | 74 cm x 57 cm | KS 1998 001 | Teylers Museum | Haarlem |
| | Portrait of Amelia Eliza van Leeuwen (1862-1923) | 1900 | 73.5 cm x 59 cm | SK-A-3450 | Rijksmuseum | Amsterdam |
| | Portrait of Letty Ansingh | 1900 | 60 cm x 48 cm | | private collection | |
| | Portrait of Maria Catharina Josephine Jordan, wife of the painter George Hendrik Breitner | 1902-1908 | 106 cm x 78 cm | SK-A-3564 | Rijksmuseum | Amsterdam |
| | Portrait of Lizzy Ansingh | 1902 | 78 cm x 62.0 cm | SK-A-4700 | Rijksmuseum | Amsterdam |
| | Bride | 1903 | 33 cm x 27 cm | | Noordbrabants Museum | Den Bosch |
| | Portrait of Geradine Marguerite van Hardenbroek | 1903 | 63 cm x 50 cm | | private collection | |
| | Portrait of Max de Vries van Buuren | 1903 | 99 cm x 81 cm | | Jewish Historical Museum | Amsterdam |
| | Portrait of Bertha Johanna Van Tienhoven | 1904 | 60.5 cm x 51.5 cm | | private collection | |
| | Portrait of Nelly Bodenheim | 1905 | 58 cm x 44 cm | | private collection | |
| | Portrait of Mrs. A.G.M. van Ogtrop-Hanlo (1871-1944) and her five children | 1906 | 176 cm x 197 cm | | Centraal Museum | Utrecht |
| | Woman from Cordoba | by 1918 | 65 cm x 50 cm | | private collection | |
| | Portrait of Thérèse Ansingh (artist name "Sorella") | 1906-1911 | 71 cm x 57 cm | | private collection | |
| | Portrait of Lizzy Ansingh | 1909 | 107 cm x 80 cm | A 6682 | Stedelijk Museum | Amsterdam |
| | Queen Wilhelmina | 1911 | 92 cm x 71 cm | | Collection Arti et Amicitiae | Amsterdam |
| | Portrait of Richard van Wulfften Palthe 1907-1984 | 1912 | 49.5 cm diameter | | private collection | |
| | Portrait of Dr. Salomon Benjamin Druif | 1912 | 55 cm x 80 cm | | private collection | |
| | Portrait of Anton Dreesman | 1912 | 120 cm x 100 cm | | Collection Vendex International | Amsterdam |
| | Portrait of Welmoet Wijnaendts Francken-Dyserinck | 1914 | 80.5 cm x 64 cm | | Atria, institute for women's history | Amsterdam |
| | Queen Wilhelmina, prince Hendrik and princess Juliana in historical outfit | 1915 | 239 cm x 262 cm | | Collection House of Orange | |
| | The Inmates of my House | 1915 | 190 cm x 230 cm | | Museum De Lakenhal | Leiden |
| | Portrait of Frederik Daniël Otto Obreen (1840–96), director Rijksmuseum | 1915 | 87 cm x 80 cm | SK-A-2724 | Rijksmuseum | Amsterdam |
| | The six daughters of Charles E. H. Boissevain and his wife Maria Barbera Pijnappel | 1916 | 130.5 cm x 146 cm | | Amsterdam Museum | Amsterdam |
| | Self-portrait with black hat and glasses | 1917 | 55 cm x 47 cm | RP-T-2009-41 | Rijksmuseum | Amsterdam |
| | Portrait of Hugo de Vries (1848-1935) | 1918 | 109.5 cm x 130.5 cm | | UVA Library | Amsterdam |

== Sources ==
- Thérèse Schwartze (1851-1918). Een vorstelijk portrettiste, C. Hollema en P. Kouwenhoven, Zutphen, 1998
- Thérèse Schwartze in the RKD
