= Gerritdina Benders-Letteboer =

Dutch Resistance fighter

- Born: Gerritdina Letteboer; 1 September 1909; Ambt Almelo, Overijssel, Netherlands
- Died: 12 March 1980 (aged 70); Amstelveen, North Holland, Netherlands
- Other names: Gerritdina Letterboer, Gerritdina Benders-Letterboer
- Occupations: Dutch Resistance, Speech Therapist
- Spouse: Johan Benders
- Parent(s): Johan Letteboer and Janna Eshuis
- Awards: Righteous Among the Nations (1997)

Gerritdina Benders-Letteboer (1909–1980) was a member of the Dutch Resistance, who actively protected multiple Dutch Jewish citizens from Nazi persecution and deportation during World War II. Posthumously declared with her husband, Johan Benders (1907–1943), to be Righteous Among the Nations on 27 March 1997 by Yad Vashem, she and her husband were also honored by The International Raoul Wallenberg Foundation, which placed their names on their “List of Dutch Saviors.”

Alternative spellings of her maiden name, "Letteboer" and "Letterboer", have been used in primary sources and other materials.

== Biography ==
Born on 1 September 1909 in Ambt Almelo, a former municipality in the Netherlands province of Overijssel, Gerritdina Letteboer was a daughter of Almelo natives Johan Letteboer (1881–1927) and Janna (Eshuis) Letteboer (born 29 December 1883). She and her sister, Johanna Letteboer (1908–1957), grew up in Almelo.

Gerritdina Letteboer opted to begin her own family when she wed Johan Benders (1907–1943) sometime during the mid to late 1930s. A native of Bloemendaal, he would go on to become an active member of the Dutch Resistance during World War II while continuing his work as a teacher at the Amsterdams Lyceum. They settled in Amstelveen in the Netherlands province of North Holland, and greeted the arrival of their first child in 1939.

=== World War II ===
Gerritdina Benders-Letteboer and her husband, Johan Benders, became active members of the Dutch Resistance in response to the invasion and occupation of the Netherlands by Germany in May 1940, and the expulsion of Jewish students from the Amsterdams Lyceum as part of a series of persecution laws enacted against Dutch Jewish citizens.

Teaching student Tineke Guilonard and other older members of his classes how to forge identity papers and food ration cards for Jewish people to help them avoid this persecution, Johan Benders also encouraged his wife to turn their home into a hiding place for Jewish men, women and children. Among those finding refuge at the Benders’ home were two of Benders’ former pupils, Rosalie and Katie Wijnberg, Jewish sisters who had left their parents’ home in the Dutch East Indies to reside with an aunt in the Netherlands, and suddenly found themselves at risk of persecution and deportation. They remained at the Benders’ home through the Netherlands’ Liberation.

In 1941, the Benders greeted the arrival of their second child. By 1943, they were also sheltering Lore Polak, who ultimately survived the war and emigrated to America.

That same year (1943), a neighbor who was a Nazi sympathizer alerted Dutch and German officials to the Benders’ resistance activities. In response, the Geheime Staatspolizei (known more commonly as the "Gestapo") raided the Benders’ home on 4 April 1943, arrested Johan Benders, Lore Polak and Katie Wijnberg, and jailed them. At the time of his arrest, Johan Benders had a list in his pocket with the coded names and addresses of 18 Jewish people he had helped hide; Gerritdina Benders-Letteboer was five months pregnant and the mother of two young daughters.

Charged with stealing from the registrar's office at his school, Johan Benders was incarcerated at the Amstelveenseweg prison, and housed in a cell with Dutch poet Gerrit Kouwenaar. Fearful that he would break under the Nazi torture to which he was being subjected, and determined not to reveal the hiding places of the Jewish people he and his wife had hidden, Benders attempted suicide twice while in jail before finally succeeding in ending his own life on 6 April 1943 by jumping from the third floor of the prison where he was being interrogated and tortured. In protest, "many of Johan’s former students marched past the jail whistling the school song," according to Yad Vashem. The International Raoul Wallenberg Foundation notes that Johan Benders was a hero to the end, having never revealed the names or addresses of the Jewish people he had helped to save.

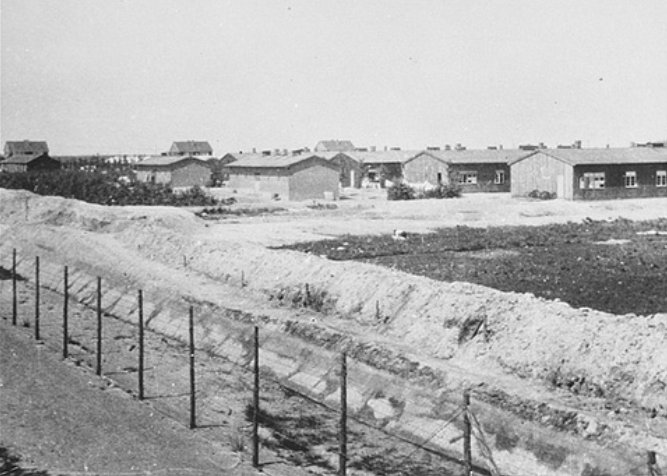
Westerbork Transit Camp, The Netherlands (c. 1940–1945, army photograph, public domain)

Meanwhile, Lore Polak and Katie Wijnberg were sent to the Nazi transit camp at Westerbork to await deportation to a German concentration camp.

Following her husband’s death, Gerritdina Benders-Letteboer continued on with their resistance and rescue work. After searching for and finding Lore Polak, who had escaped from the concentration camp where she had been deported, she returned her to the safety of her home, and then sought out another of her husband’s former students, Jan Doedens, and brought her into hiding to prevent her deployment via the Arbeitseinsatz, which forced Dutch citizens to work as slave laborers. Katie Wijnberg also then became part of the reconstituted family when she was released from Westerbork.

=== Post-war life ===
Following the war, Gerritdina Benders-Letteboer began to build a new life not just for herself and her daughters, but also for one of the girls she had sheltered from Nazi persecution and deportation – Lore Polak, who had discovered that her entire family had been murdered during the Holocaust. Lore resided at the Benders’ home for four years before emigrating to America.

Gerritdina Benders’ sister, Johanna, also went on to build a family. Her life, however, was a short one. After marrying Benjamin Pieter Liese, she died at the age of 49 on 26 December 1957 in Wildervank, Veendam, Groningen, Netherlands.

Gerritdina Benders-Letteboer died in Amstelveen, North Holland, Netherlands on 13 March 1980.

== Awards ==
On 27 March 1997 Gerritdina Benders-Letteboer and her husband, Johan Benders, were posthumously declared Righteous Among the Nations by Yad Vashem.

The couple was also honored when a street in Amstelveen was named "Benderslaan" in honor of their resistance and rescue work.

== External resources ==
- "Deportation of Dutch Jews." Washington, D.C.: United States Holocaust Memorial Museum.
- "Camp Westerbork" (history) and "Persecution of Jews," (timeline, anti-Jewish measures, deportation, into hiding). Hooghalen, Netherlands: Herinneringscentrum Kamp Westerbork.
- "The Netherlands," in "Holocaust Encyclopedia." Washington, D.C.: United States Holocaust Memorial Museum.
- The Righteous Among the Nations (background information and database of names). Jerusalem, Israel: Yad Vashem.
