= Stad Almelo =

Coordinates: 52.354524°N 6.66618°E

Stad Almelo is a former municipality in the Dutch province of Overijssel. It consisted of the city of Almelo.

It existed from 1818 to 1914, when it merged with the municipality of Ambt Almelo, which covered the surrounding countryside.
