= Cloudy land =

Cottage in Montferland, Netherlands

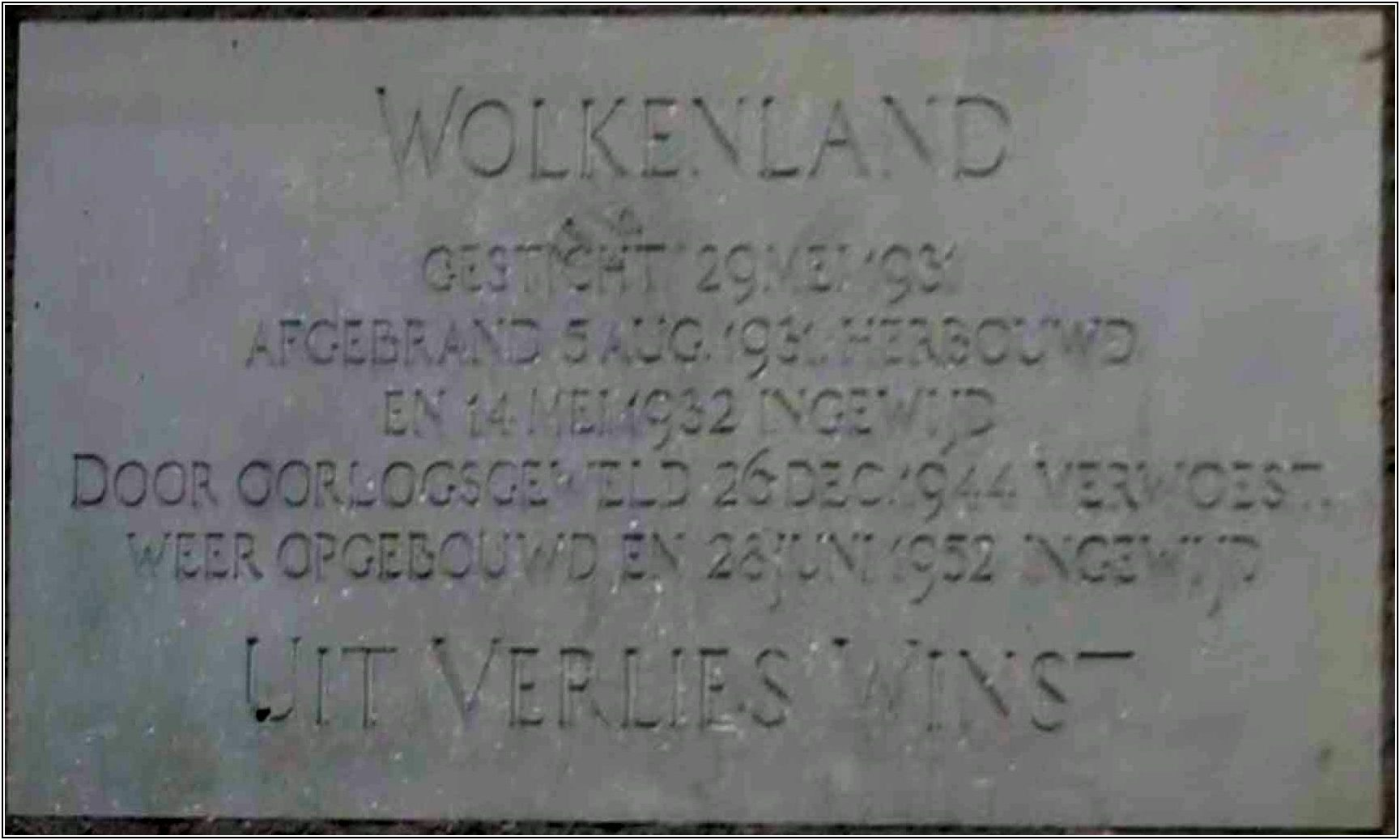
A memorial plaque on the wall of the modern building Wolkenland, originally built by the artist Carl Emanuel Leberecht Garshagen.

Cloudy land (Wolkenland) is a cottage in the woods of Montferland, near Beek. It is owned by the Dutch Amsterdams Lyceum. Every student of the school visits the cottage once a year with his or her fellow students.

== History ==
In 1919, an artist named Carl Imanuel Leberecht Garschagen build a villa, one kilometer south-east of Beek, nearby 't Peeske. He liked to paint a lot, especially the overwhelming nature and the cloudy skies. It is believed that the name 'Cloudy Land' was given to the villa because of this. After him, lady Brantsen from Rhenen lived there. She is destined to marry the Baron of Heeckeren van Keel, but she didn't want to: 'As a friend, yes, but not as a husband!' . In 1931, the house was bought by 'Het Amsterdams Lyceum', as an outdoor cottage. They did have to sell the twelve acres of land that had come with it. The mayor of the nearby village 's Herenberg opened the house. In 1932, there was a fire that burned the place down. It was rebuilt, but destroyed again on December 26, 1944, in World War II. It was bombed by British fighter-bombers of the Royal Air Force.It was not a mistake, even though it looked like that because Cloudy Land is situated nearby Germany, but it was a precision bombing. In 1943, the Germans had made Cloudy Land into an observation post. From the hill of Cloudy Land, there is an excellent view over the valley of the river the IJssel and the Rijn. In the difficult period after the Second World War, the rector of the school managed to get the permission and funds to build the nowadays Cloudy Land. It was officially opened on June 28, 1952.

== Slab ==
On a slab on the outside of the cottage, there is a small list of data on which Cloudy Land was built, rebuild, burned down etc. It says:

Uit Verlies Winst

Gesticht 29 mei 1931

Afgebrand 5 aug. 1931, herbouwd

en 14 mei 1932 ingewijd

Door oorlogsgeweld 26 dec.1944 verwoest, Weer opgebouwd en 28 juni 1952 ingewijd

Rough translation:

Gain from loss

Founded 29 Mai 1931

Burned down 5 Aug. 1931, rebuild

and 14 Mai 1932 inaugurated

Ravaged by war 26 December 1944, Again rebuild and inaugurated 28 June 1952

The quote: 'Gain from loss (Uit Verlies Winst)' is the slogan of the first rector of Het Amsterdams Lyceum, C.P. Gunning.

== Purpose ==
Since 1931, almost every class of the school came to Cloudy Land once a year. It has become a unique experience for generations of (ex-)students of Het Amsterdams Lyceum. Nowadays, the week that is being spent by the students contains thematic project-based learning that is combined with playing outdoors. Moreover, the Cloudy Land Week is of great value to social contacts within the classes. This is the reason why the first graders always go in the beginning of the year. They will get to know their classmates better.
