= Liesbeth van Tongeren =

Dutch politician

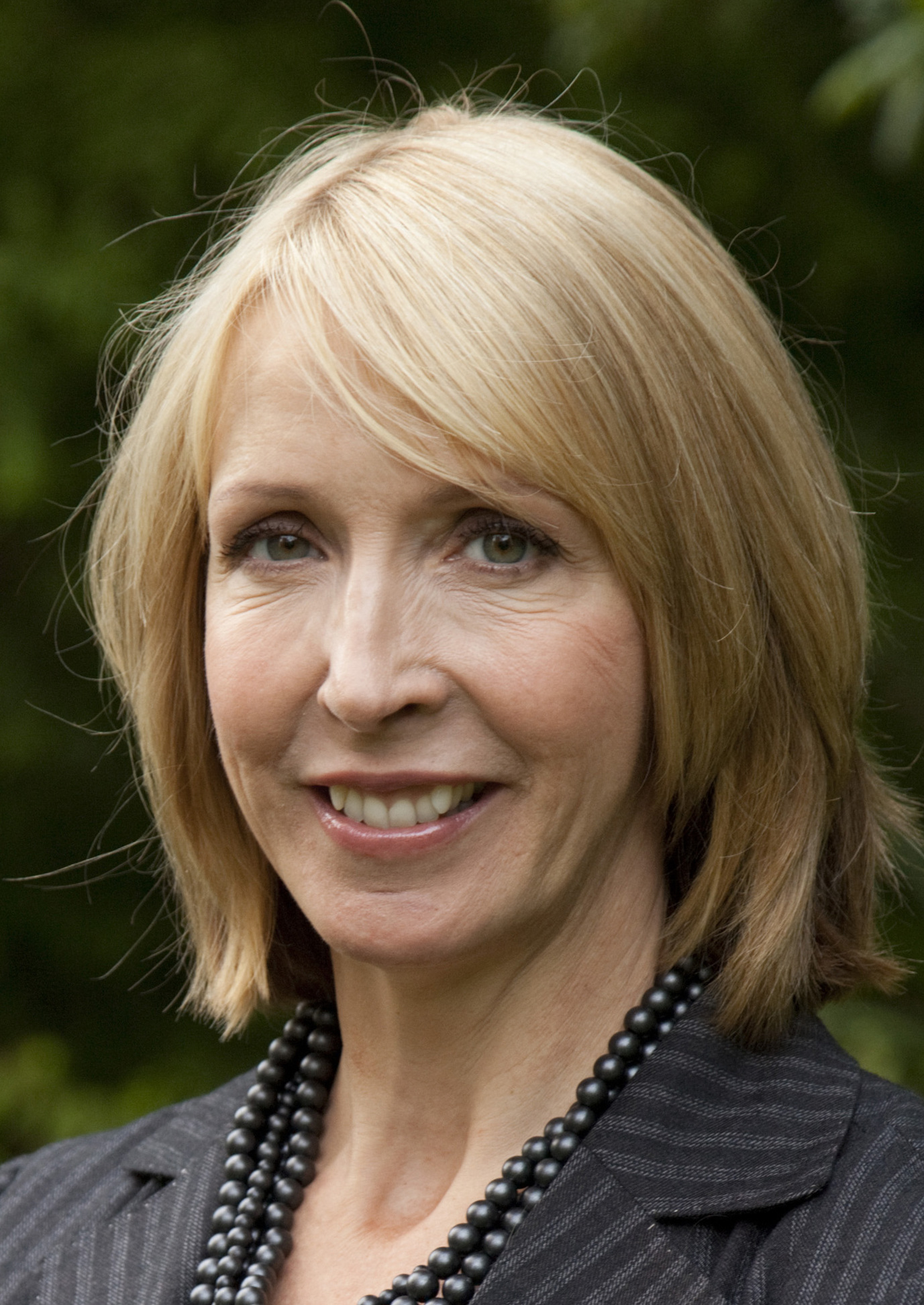
- Liesbeth van Tongeren

Member of the House of Representatives
- In office 17 June 2010 – 13 June 2018

Personal details
- Born: 31 March 1958 (age 68) Vlaardingen
- Party: GreenLeft
- Occupation: Politician

Liesbeth van Tongeren (born 31 March 1958 in Vlaardingen) is a Dutch politician, and former civil servant and director of Greenpeace Netherlands (2003–2010). As a member of GroenLinks, she was a member of the House of Representatives from 17 June 2010 to 13 June 2018. She focuses on matters of climate, energy, spatial planning, conservation and traffic. On 7 June 2018, she was appointed alderwoman of The Hague. Her portfolio as alderwoman consists of sustainability and energy transition.

Van Tongeren grew up in Almelo and obtained an LL.B. from VU University Amsterdam and an LL.M. in international law from the University of Amsterdam.
