= Dick Swaab =

Dutch physician and neurobiologist

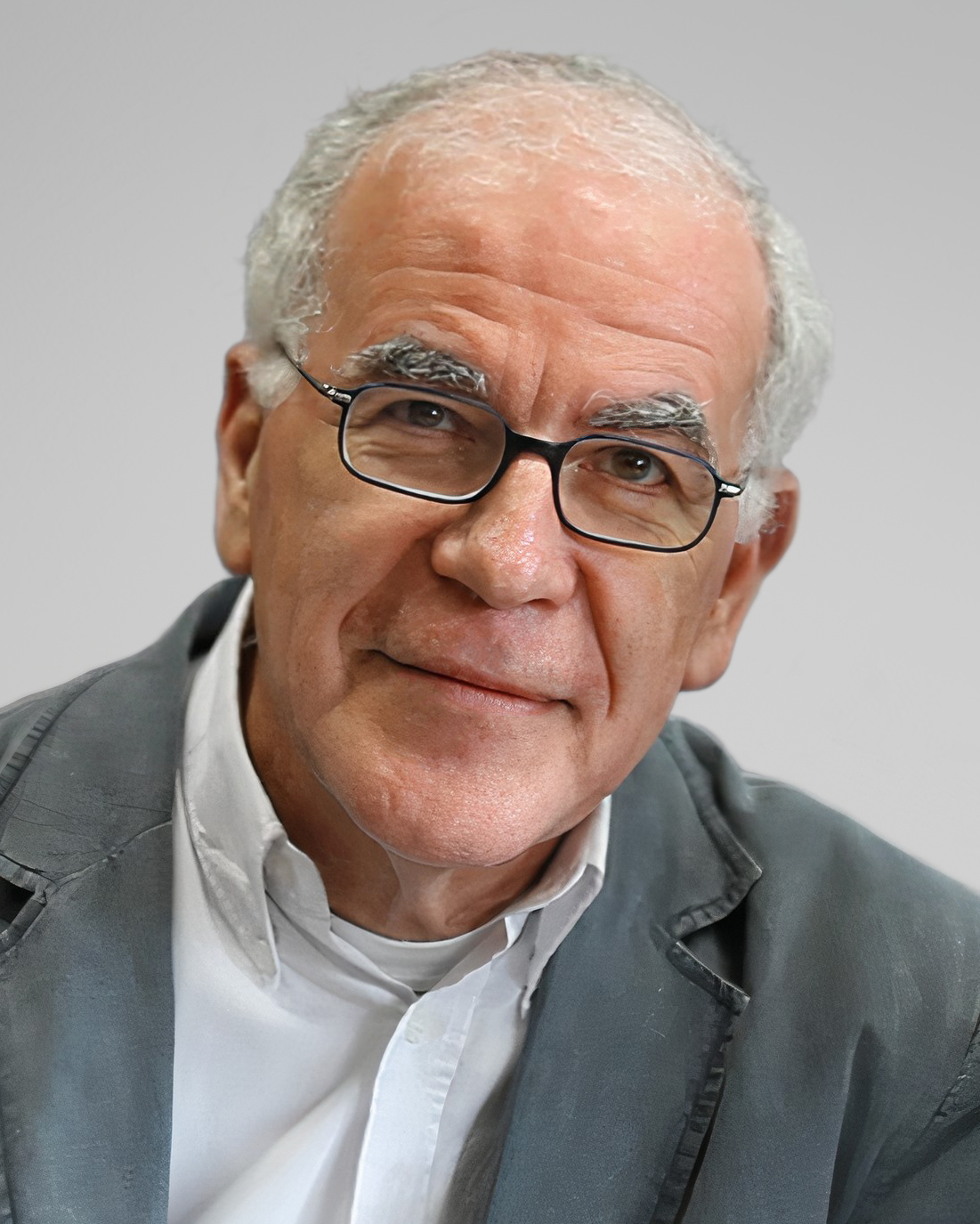
- Born: 17 December 1944 (age 81); Amsterdam, Netherlands
- Occupations: Professor, physician
- Medical career
- Field: Medicine
- Institutions: University of Amsterdam
- Sub-specialties: Neuroendocrinology
- Research: Brain Development
- Awards: Knight in the Order of the Netherlands Lion

Dick Frans Swaab (born 17 December 1944) is a Dutch physician and neurobiologist (brain researcher). He is a professor of neurobiology at the University of Amsterdam and was until 2005 Director of the Netherlands Institute for Brain Research (Nederlands Instituut voor Hersenonderzoek) of the Royal Netherlands Academy of Arts and Sciences (Koninklijke Nederlandse Akademie van Wetenschappen).

== Life ==
Swaab graduated at the Amsterdams Lyceum in 1963. He received his doctorate of medicine at the University of Amsterdam in 1968, and his Ph.D. in 1970 with professor J. Ariëns Kappers on a neuroendocrine thesis, and in 1972 he received his medical degree. He was from 1978 the director of the Netherlands Institute for Brain Research. In 1979 he was appointed professor of neurobiology at the University of Amsterdam. In 1985 he founded the Nederlandse Hersenbank—known in English as The Netherlands Brain Bank—to facilitate international research on brain diseases. Swaab is an atheist.

== Research ==
Swaab is best known for his research and discoveries in the field of brain anatomy and physiology, in particular the impact that various hormonal and biochemical factors in the womb have on brain development. Another area of Swaab's work, which has drawn much attention, is his research on how sexual dimorphism relates to brain anatomy, as well as research relating to sexual orientation and transsexuality. Through his years of research, Swaab, according to his own words, came to the deterministic and materialistic conclusion that brains are not things we have, but rather brains are what we are: the physical and chemical processes in our brains determine how we react and who we are. Currently, Swaab is most active in the field of depression and Alzheimer's research.

Swaab's research has on several occasions produced controversy. After conducting research suggesting links between brain anatomy and sexual orientation, Swaab reports receiving death threats from individuals believing this work was attempting to 'pathologize' homosexuality and treat it as a biological abnormality or disorder. Swaab's view that neither free will nor metaphysical entities such as souls or spirits exist has also caused negative reactions among various religious groups. Swaab consistently defends his studies in the face of such criticism.

== Recognition ==
Swaab has numerous scientific awards and was a mentor for at least 84 Ph.D. students, 16 of whom became full professors. He is an editor for several neuroscience journals. Swaab has an H-index of 135, as of 2023, having been cited over 34,000 times.

He is a member, honorary member, and founder of many scientific and professional associations. He was the second person to be awarded the Emil Kraepelin Guest Professorship at the Max Planck Institute of Psychiatry, Munich, Germany, in 1996, and is a visiting professor in three locations in China, and at Stanford University, United States. He also is appointed Chao Kuang Piu Professor at Zhejiang University, Hangzhou, P.-R. China. He has been decorated with the Knight of the Order of the Netherlands Lion, a high order of chivalry of the Kingdom of the Netherlands.

== Education ==
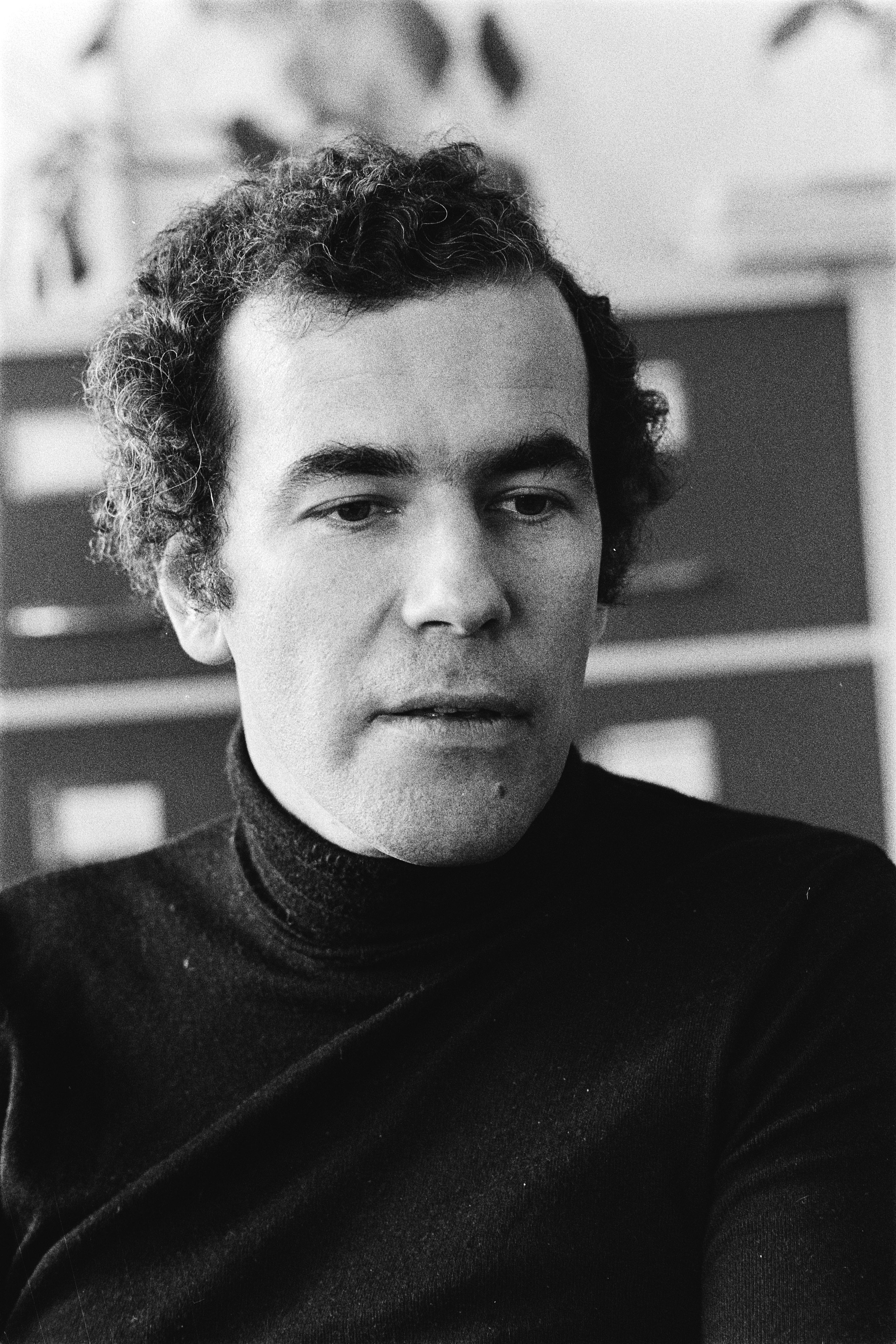
Swaab in 1980.

- 1963 Final examination Amsterdams Lyceum
- 1968 MD Medicine, University of Amsterdam
- 1970 Ph.D. Thesis: Factors influencing neurosecretory activity of the supraoptic and paraventricular nuclei in rat. A histochemical and cytochemical study. Mentor: Prof. dr. J. Ariëns Kappers
- 1972 General physician, University of Amsterdam

== Professional career ==
- Acting director of the Netherlands Institute for Brain Research, an institute of the Royal Netherlands Academy of Arts and Sciences (KNAW) (1975-1978)
- Director of the Netherlands Institute for Brain Research (1978-2005)
- Professor of neurobiology at the medical faculty, University of Amsterdam (1979-2009)
- Leader research team neuropsychiatric disorders, Neth. Inst for Neuroscience (1978-now)
- Founder and, until 2005, director of the Netherlands Brain Bank (1985-2005)

== Workplaces ==
- University of Amsterdam
- Netherlands Institute for Neuroscience
- Netherlands Brain Bank
- Max Planck Institute for Psychiatry
- Stanford University
- Hangzhou, P.-R. China

== Awards and honours ==
Swaab has received the following awards and honours:

- 'Snoo-van 't Hoogerhuijs' prize (together with Dr. W.J. Honnebier) for work in the field of fetal neuroendocrinology (1976)
- 'Hugo van Poelgeest' prize for the Netherlands Brain Bank as an alternative for animal experiments, June 26 (1990)
- Journal of Neural Transmission (36, 195–215, 1975) paper awarded "Citation Classic" status in Current Contents 33, no. 30, p. 16. (1990)
- Emil Kraepelin Guest Professorship 1996, Max-Planck-Institut für Psychiatrie, Munich, Germany (1996)
- Royal Honour, “Knight of the Order of the Netherlands Lion” bestowed by her Royal Highness Queen Beatrix of the Netherlands (1998)
- Guest Professor of Anhui Medical University, Hefei, Anhui, PR China (1998/now)
- Guest Professor of Capital University of Medical Sciences, Beijing, P.R. China (1999/now)
- Federa Prize 2000, Federation of Medical Scientific Societies, November 17, 2000, RAI, Amsterdam, for scientific work in biomedical determinants of Alzheimer's disease (2000)
- GIRES (Gender Identity Research and Education Society) award 2002 for the article ‘Male-to-Female Transsexuals Have Female Neuron Numbers in a Limbic Nucleus.’ (Kruijver et al., J. Clin. Endocrinol. Metabol. 2034-2041 (2002)
- Alzheimer's Association Award: Lifetime Achievement Award in Alzheimer's Disease Research. Received at the 8th International Conference on Alzheimer's Disease and Related Disorders in Stockholm, Sweden, 21 July (2002)
- Honorary member of the installation committee of the journal on Gender Identity Disorders, the GID Journal (2003)
- Visiting professorship in sleep medicine (Amer.Ass.of Sleep Med.& Pfizer) at Stanford, CA, United States (2005-2006)
- Guest professor at the Beijing Institute of Radiation Medicine from 1 October 2005 to 31 December 2008 (2005-2008)
- Guest Professor at Zhejiang University, Hangzhou, China (2007)
- Academy medal for his role in national and international neuroscience (fundamental to applied), for his initiative to start the Netherlands Brain Bank, and for his research in Alzheimer's disease (2008)
- Honorary member of “Brein in Beeld” (2010)
- Chao Kuang Piu Chair of Zhejiang University, Hangzhou, P.R. China (2011–17)

== Bibliography ==
=== Monograph ===
- Dick Swaab, Ons creatieve brein, 2016. ISBN 9789045030579
- Dick Swaab, We are our Brains: From the Womb to Alzheimer's, 2014. ISBN 978-0812992960
- Dick Swaab, Wij Zijn Ons Brein: Van Baarmoeder Tot Alzheimer, Publishing Centre, 2010. ISBN 9789025435226
- Dick Swaab, The Human Hypothalamus. Basic and Clinical Aspects. Part I: Nuclei of the Hypothalamus; Part II: Neuropathology of the Hypothalamus and Adjacent Brain Structures. Handbook of Clinical Neurology, Elsevier, Amsterdam, approx. 1000 pp, 2003/2004.

=== Key papers and publications ===
Swaab has co-written extensively on a number of topics, including sexual differentiation of the brain, Alzheimer's disease, Parkinson's disease, depression, eating disorders and metabolism, multiple sclerosis, human postmortem cell culture, Huntington's disease and hypertension.
