= Johan Benders =

Dutch teacher and Resistance member

- Born: July 1, 1907; Bloemendaal
- Died: April 6, 1943 (aged 35); Amsterdam
- Cause of death: Suicide
- Occupation: Teacher
- Employer: Amsterdams Lyceum
- Title: Righteous Among The Nations
- Spouse: Gerritdina Letteboer

Johan Benders (July 1, 1907 – 6 April 1943) was a Dutch teacher who helped protect Jews in Amsterdam during World War II. He killed himself to protect the Jews he was harboring from being discovered and was posthumously named a Righteous Among the Nations.

== Biography ==
Benders was born on July 1, 1907 in Bloemendaal. He was a Dutch teacher at the Amsterdams Lyceum.

During World War II, Benders and his wife, Gerritdina Letteboer, lived in Amstelveen and became involved in the resistance. Johan was furious about the removal of the Jewish pupils from the school in 1941.

Benders encouraged his students to manufacture false identification papers and food ration cards for Jews in order to help them escape persecution by the occupying Nazi Germany. He and his wife sheltered several Jews in their home. In 1943, however, they were betrayed by a neighbor and Johan was arrested by the Gestapo. In prison, he was tortured. Johan Benders had tried to kill himself twice though survived. On 6 April he jumped from the third floor of the prison in which he was held, to avoid giving information under torture. Johan and Gerritdina took in Rosalie and Katie Wijnberg, Lore Polak, another Jewish girl, and Jan Doedens.

A cellmate, who worked in the prison administration, later discovered that Johan was not only suspected of helping Jews, but also of involvement in the attack on the population register in Amsterdam.

== Legacy ==
On 27 March 1997, Yad Vashem recognized Johan Benders and Gerritdina Letteboer as Righteous Among the Nations.

A street in Amsterdam has been named in memory of Johan Benders. This has also occurred in Amstelveen, there is a street (Benderslaan) named after him.

Dutch poet Gerrit Kouwenaar was one of Benders' pupils at the Amsterdams Lyceum. Later, during the Nazi occupation, he was held captive in the same prison as Benders. Kouwenaar tells the pseudonymised Benders' story in his 1969 poem "drs van schaffelaar" ("mr van schaffelaar m.a.").
