= Mariaparochie =

- Village
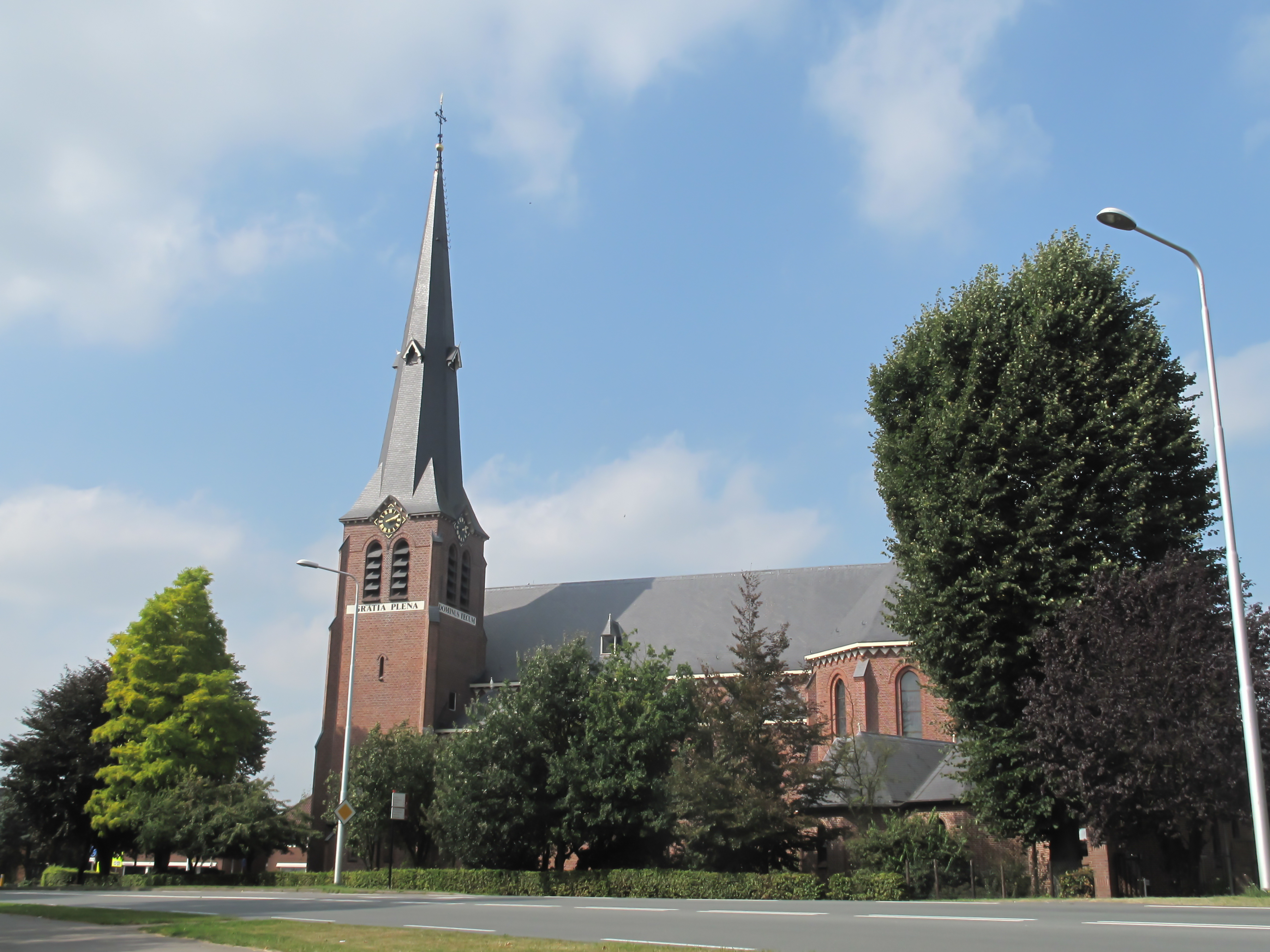
- Church of Mariaparochie

- Location in the Netherlands Mariaparochie (Netherlands)
- Coordinates: 52°22′48″N 6°42′24″E
- Country: Netherlands
- Province: Overijssel
- Municipality: Tubbergen; Almelo

Area
  - Total: 0.19 km^{2} (0.073 sq mi)
- Elevation: 12 m (39 ft)

Population (2021)
  - Total: 240
  - Density: 1,300/km^{2} (3,300/sq mi)
- Time zone: UTC+1 (CET)
  - Summer (DST): UTC+2 (CEST)
- Postal code: 7614
- Dialing code: 0546

Mariaparochie [ma'riaːpaˌrɔxi] is a village in the Dutch province of Overijssel. The greater part of it belongs to the municipality of Tubbergen while a small part, with the local church, belongs to Almelo. Mariaparochie lies about 4 km northeast of Almelo.

In 1918, the Our Lady of Perpetual Help Church was built and enlarged in 1923. In 1936, there was a settlement around the church. The village is twinned with Harbrinkhoek, but both still have separate place name signs, statistical entries and postal codes.
