= Amsterdams Lyceum =

Coordinates: 52°21′4.73″N 4°51′52.57″E

Het Amsterdams Lyceum
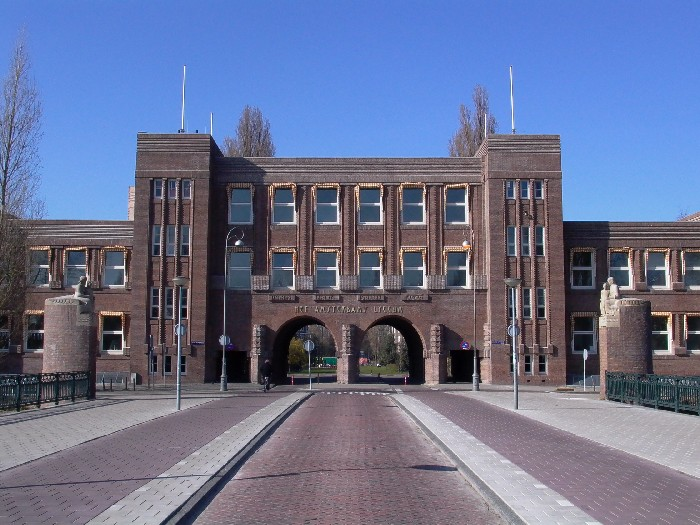
- Amsterdam; Netherlands

Information
- Type: Public
- Motto: Potius deficere quam desperare (Latin) (Literal: Rather perish than despair)
- Established: 1917
- Principal: Tom van Veen
- Enrollment: 1104 students
- Colour
- Affiliations: www.amsterdamslyceum.nl

The Amsterdams Lyceum is a Dutch secondary school combining gymnasium and atheneum. Both school types prepare students to go to university. It was established in 1917. The Amsterdams Lyceum has around 1100 students, most of whom are from Amsterdam, but small numbers from outer municipalities such as Amstelveen and Badhoevedorp also find their way to this school.

== History ==
The Amsterdams Lyceum is the oldest lyceum of the Netherlands. It was founded in 1917 by Dr. C. P. Gunning (1886-1960) who remained rector until 1952. The building has been in operation since 1920, it was designed by the Dutch Architect H.A.J. Baanders and built in the architectural style of the Amsterdamse school. The windows were painted by artist R.N. Roland Holst and the building is an official historic site and city monument.

Dr. Gunning believed that school was more than just a place to obtain a diploma, many extra-curricular activities were initiated and in 1931 the school bought a private recreational retreat in the southeast Netherlands; Wolkenland. Every class would spend one week a year there working on alternative projects and assignments.

During the World War II the Nazis appropriated the building, using the classrooms as barracks and the Rector's house as an officers' mess. On top of this, Dr. Gunning was an outspoken objector to the deportation of students. His protest meant that he was fired, arrested and imprisoned in Amersfoort concentration camp in January 1942. The school lost 95 (former) students during this period, every April a ceremony takes place to commemorate this loss.

== Intensified language courses ==
At the Amsterdam Lyceum students can work their way through various optional intensified language courses. Trayecto Espanol, Corso Italiano and Fast Lane English. The latter course leads up to the Certificate in Advanced English in year 5 and the Certificate of Proficiency in English in year 6.

== Foreign exchanges ==
The Amsterdam Lyceum is famous for its foreign trips and exchanges. Besides Wolkenland the students go to other countries in their last three years of school. With Trayecto Espanol, Corso Italiano and Fast Lane English you are expected to visit the country corresponding to the language you study. This takes place in the fourth year of high school. Fast Lane students travel to Cambridge, Corso Italiano to Florence and Trayecto Espanol to Granada.

In the fifth year the whole class goes to Rome. This is a 20-year-old tradition. In Amsterdam gymnasium schools visit Rome with the entire fifth year but the Amsterdam Lyceum goes with 120 students, also the Athenaeum students, who do not follow the gymnasium course. In the last year of high school there are eight international exchanges with schools in other countries. Those schools first visit the Amsterdam Lyceum before the students of the Dutch school visit them. The time span of those exchanges is usually eight or ten days. The options are Venice, South Africa, Israel, St. Petersburg, Sevilla, New York, Prague and Iceland.

== Neighbourhood ==
The Amsterdam lyceum is located in a neighbourhood of Amsterdam called Oud-Zuid. Many families with little children live there and famous Dutch actors and writers. This area of Amsterdam is located south of the city center. It is among the wealthiest neighborhoods of Amsterdam. The school is in the museum area of Amsterdam with the Van Gogh Museum, Rijksmuseum and the Concertgebouw. The Vondelpark is adjacent to the museum district. Students of the Amsterdams Lyceum go there often to relax, eat and play football.

== Clubs ==
The Amsterdam Lyceum has a lot of clubs organized by the school. Every student no matter what age is allowed to participate in those activities. Auditions are only required at the dance and theater club. After three years at the drama club a certificate is handed out to you, and with that certificate the chance of being accepted to a professional theatre school is considerable. Every year there is a theatre week of dancing, singing and acting where teachers and the other students of The Amsterdam Lyceum view the performances.

The Amsterdam Lyceum also has a rowing club, "De Drietand", a video, photo and etching club.

They also have a great school newspaper, called the HALO. It's made by the students and has won several awards.

== Alumni association ==
The Oud-Leerlingen Organisatie (Former Students Organization) abbreviated OLO is the alumni association of the school. Every former student is automatically considered a "member". The OLO is formally a foundation and is funded via donations of the alumni.

== Notable graduates ==
- Mahir Alkaya, politician
- Johan Benders Dutch resistance fighter during the second world war
- Remco Campert, Dutch poet and writer
- Gijs van Hall, Dutch resistance fighter during WWII, Mayor of Amsterdam and Senator
- Walraven van Hall, Dutch banker en resistance fighter during the second world war
- Gerrit Kouwenaar, Dutch poet
- Gijs Scholten van Aschat, actor
- Dick Swaab, doctor and neurobiologist

== See also ==
- List of schools in the Netherlands
