= Ambt Almelo =

Coordinates: 52°21′N 6°41′E

Ambt Almelo is a former municipality in the Dutch province of Overijssel. It covered the area around the city centre of Almelo. In 1913, the municipality was merged with the municipality of Almelo.

== See also ==
- Stad Almelo
