= Catharina Julia Roeters van Lennep =

Dutch painter

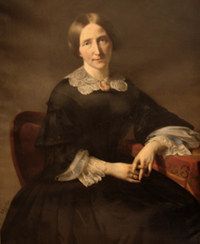
- Born: 26 October 1813; Almelo
- Died: 2 December 1883 (aged 70); Amsterdam
- Education: Royal Academy of Fine Arts in Amsterdam
- Known for: still life, oil painting
- Spouse: Jeronimo de Vries
- Awards: silver medal of the Society Felix Meritis.

Catharina Julia Roeters van Lennep (1813–1883) was a Dutch artist.

== Life ==
She was born in 1813 in Almelo, the daughter of the merchant, also consul in Königsberg, Jacob Roeters van Lennep and Johanna Hermina Coster. She was educated at the Royal Academy of Fine Arts in Amsterdam, where she became an honorary member in 1838. Her work has been exhibited here regularly. She was a student of Anton Weiss. Roeters van Lennep painted still lifes, using flowers and fruit, as well as hunting scenes. One of her still lifes was awarded the silver medal of the Society Felix Meritis in 1842. She was portrayed by the Amsterdam painter Thérèse Schwartze.

On 5 October 1836, Roeters van Lennep married the lawyer and later district judge Jeronimo de Vries, in Amsterdam. Together with her husband she campaigned for the establishment of nursery schools in Amsterdam. The founding of the Sophia nursery, which they gained the support of the then Princess Sophie, it was the first tangible result. Through this example, there would be nine kindergartens founded within three years in Amsterdam. She died in December 1883 at the age of 70 in her Amsterdam.
