= Crystal structure of boron-rich metal borides =

Boron chemical complexes

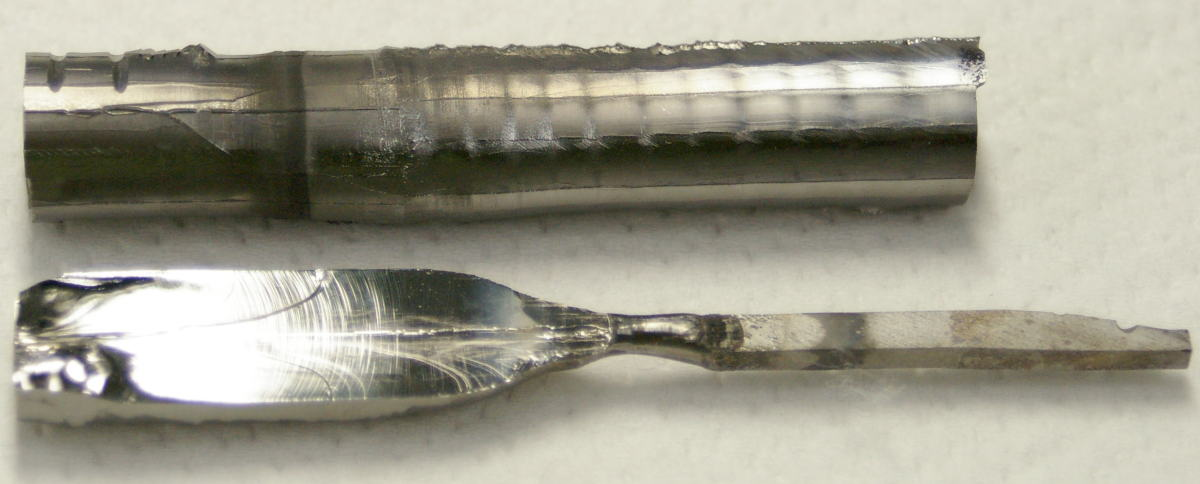
Two single crystals of YB_{66} (1 cm diameter) grown by floating zone technique using (100) oriented seeds. In the top crystal, the seed (left from the black line) has same diameter as the crystal. In the bottom crystal (sliced), the seed is much thinner and is on the right side.

Metals, and specifically rare-earth elements, form numerous chemical complexes with boron. Their crystal structure and chemical bonding depend strongly on the metal element M and on its atomic ratio to boron. When B/M ratio exceeds 12, boron atoms form B_{12} icosahedra which are linked into a three-dimensional boron framework, and the metal atoms reside in the voids of this framework. Those icosahedra are basic structural units of most allotropes of boron and boron-rich rare-earth borides. In such borides, metal atoms donate electrons to the boron polyhedra, and thus these compounds are regarded as electron-deficient solids.

The crystal structures of many boron-rich borides can be attributed to certain types including MgAlB_{14}, YB_{66}, REB_{41}Si_{1.2}, B_{4}C and other, more complex types such as RE_{x}B_{12}C_{0.33}Si_{3.0}. Some of these formulas, for example B_{4}C, YB_{66} and MgAlB_{14}, historically reflect the idealistic structures, whereas the experimentally determined composition is nonstoichiometric and corresponds to fractional indexes. Boron-rich borides are usually characterized by large and complex unit cells, which can contain more than 1500 atomic sites and feature extended structures shaped as "tubes" and large modular polyhedra ("superpolyhedra"). Many of those sites have partial occupancy, meaning that the probability to find them occupied with a certain atom is smaller than one and thus that only some of them are filled with atoms. Scandium is distinguished among the rare-earth elements by that it forms numerous borides with uncommon structure types; this property of scandium is attributed to its relatively small atomic and ionic radii.

Crystals of the specific rare-earth boride YB_{66} are used as X-ray monochromators for selecting X-rays with certain energies (in the 1–2 keV range) out of synchrotron radiation. Other rare-earth borides may find application as thermoelectric materials, owing to their low thermal conductivity; the latter originates from their complex, "amorphous-like", crystal structure.

== Metal borides ==
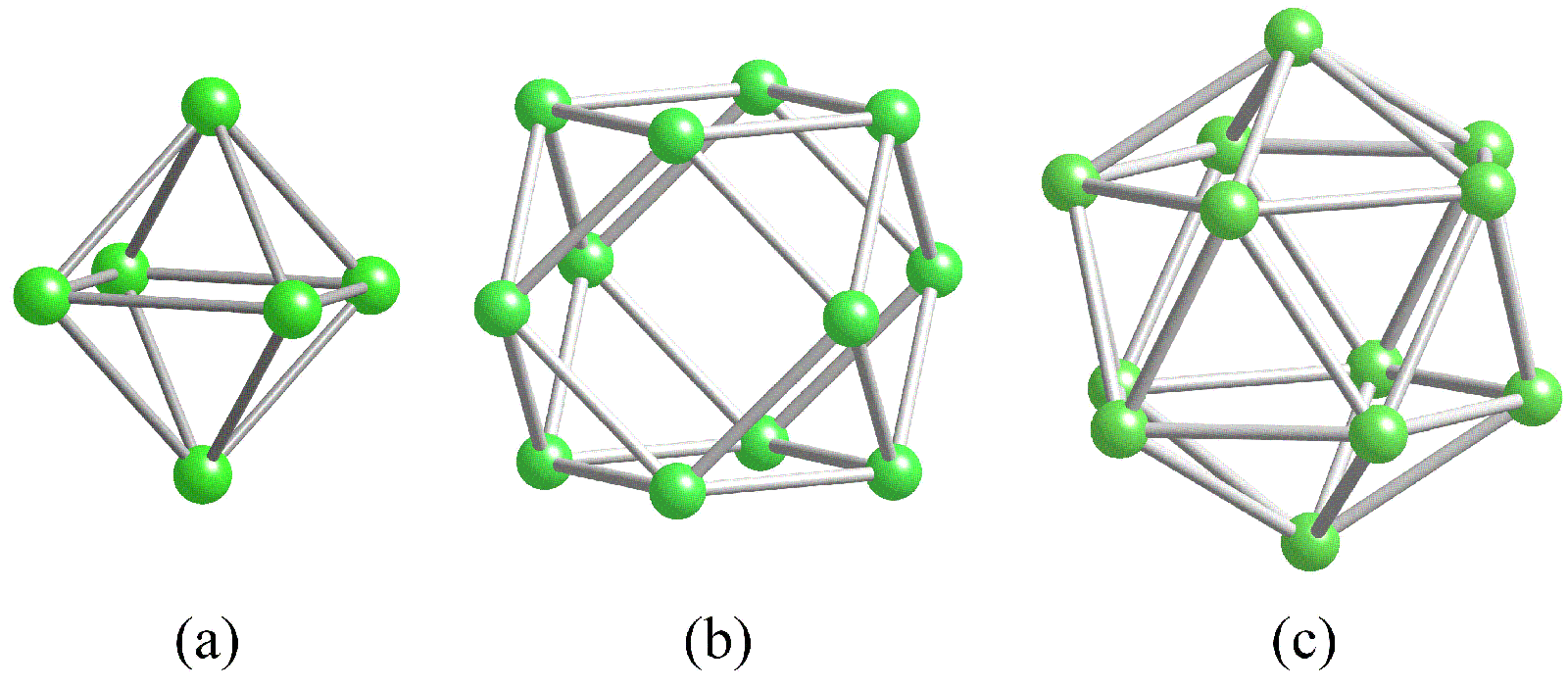
Fig. 1. (a) B_{6} octahedron, (b) B_{12} cuboctahedron and (c) B_{12} icosahedron.

In metal borides, the bonding of boron varies depending on the atomic ratio B/M. Diborides have B/M = 2, as in the well-known superconductor MgB_{2}; they crystallize in a hexagonal AlB_{2}-type layered structure. Hexaborides have B/M = 6 and form a three-dimensional boron framework based on a boron octahedron (Fig. 1a). Tetraborides, i.e. B/M = 4, are mixtures of diboride and hexaboride structures. Cuboctahedron (Fig. 1b) is the structural unit of dodecaborides, which have a cubic lattice and B/M = 12. When the composition ratio exceeds 12, boron forms B_{12} icosahedra (Fig. 1c) which are linked into a three-dimensional boron framework, and the metal atoms reside in the voids of this framework.

This complex bonding behavior originates from the fact that boron has only three valence electrons; this hinders tetrahedral bonding as in diamond or hexagonal bonding as in graphite. Instead, boron atoms form polyhedra. For example, three boron atoms make up a triangle where they share two electrons to complete the so-called three-center bonding. Boron polyhedra, such as B_{6} octahedron, B_{12} cuboctahedron and B_{12} icosahedron, lack two valence electrons per polyhedron to complete the polyhedron-based framework structure. Metal atoms need to donate two electrons per boron polyhedron to form boron-rich metal borides. Thus, boron compounds are often regarded as electron-deficient solids. The covalent bonding nature of metal boride compounds also give them their hardness and inert chemical reactivity property.

Icosahedral B_{12} compounds include α-rhombohedral boron (B_{13}C_{2}), β-rhombohedral boron (MeB_{x}, 23≤x), α-tetragonal boron (B_{48}B_{2}C_{2}), β-tetragonal boron (β-AlB_{12}), AlB_{10} or AlC_{4}B_{24}, YB_{25}, YB_{50}, YB_{66}, NaB_{15} or MgAlB_{14}, γ-AlB_{12}, BeB_{3} and SiB_{6}.

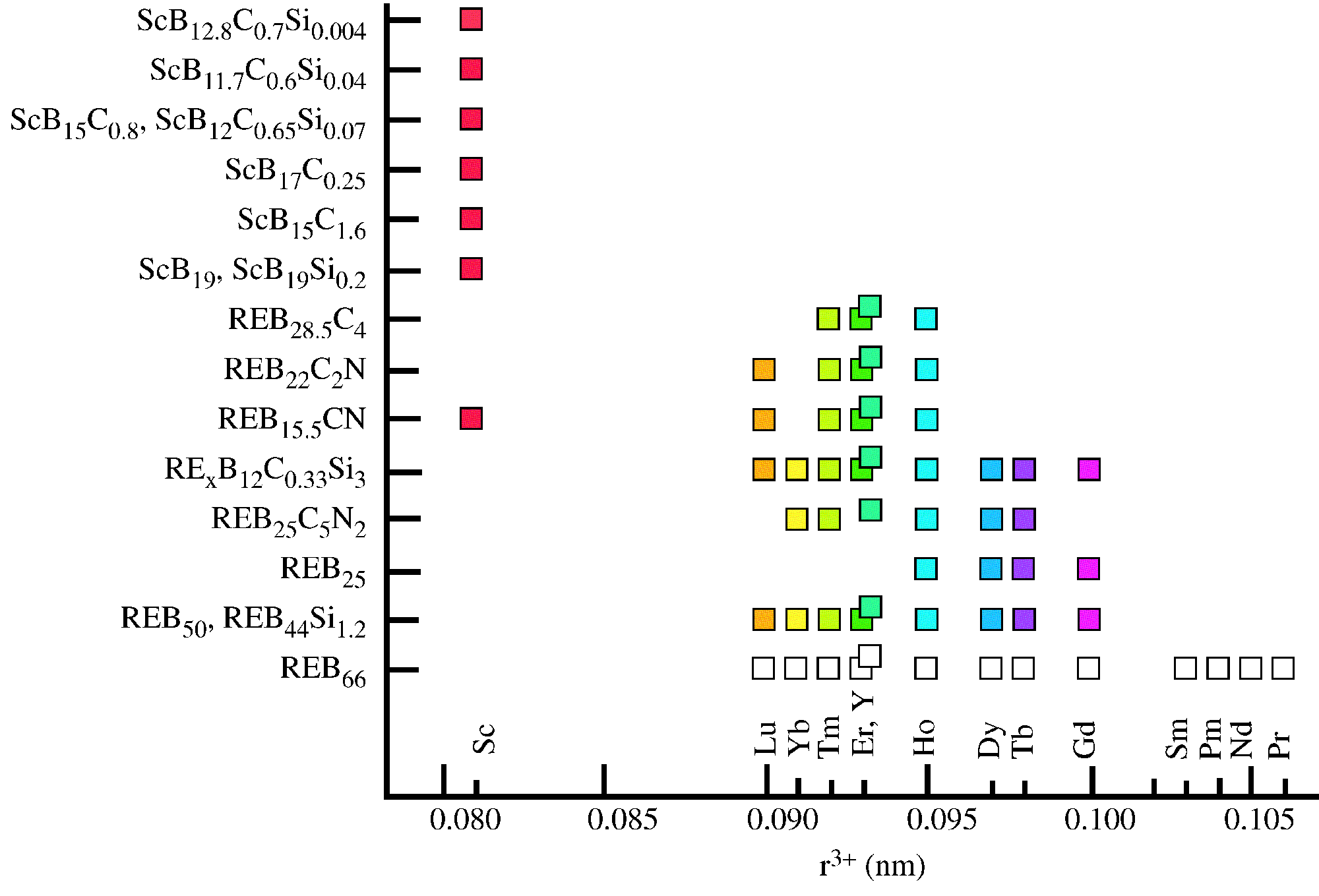
Fig. 2. Relationship between the ionic radius of trivalent rare-earth ion and chemical composition of icosahedron-based rare-earth borides.

YB_{25} and YB_{50} decompose without melting that hinders their growth as single crystals by the floating zone method. However, addition of a small amount of Si solves this problem and results in single crystals with the stoichiometry of YB_{41}Si_{1.2}. This stabilization technique allowed the synthesis of some other boron-rich rare-earth borides.

Albert and Hillebrecht reviewed binary and selected ternary boron compounds containing main-group elements, namely, borides of the alkali and alkaline-earth metals, aluminum borides and compounds of boron and the nonmetals C, Si, Ge, N, P, As, O, S and Se. They, however, excluded the described here icosahedron-based rare-earth borides. Note that rare-earth elements have d- and f-electrons that complicates chemical and physical properties of their borides. Werheit et al. reviewed Raman spectra of numerous icosahedron-based boron compounds.

Figure 2 shows a relationship between the ionic radius of trivalent rare-earth ions and the composition of some rare-earth borides. Note that scandium has many unique boron compounds, as shown in figure 2, because of the much smaller ionic radius compared with other rare-earth elements.

In understanding the crystal structures of rare-earth borides, it is important to keep in mind the concept of partial site occupancy, that is, some atoms in the described below unit cells can take several possible positions with a given statistical probability. Thus, with the given statistical probability, some of the partial-occupancy sites in such a unit cell are empty, and the remained sites are occupied.

== REAlB_{14} and REB_{25} ==
Compounds that were historically given the formulae REAlB_{14} and REB_{25} have the MgAlB_{14} structure with an orthorhombic symmetry and space group Imma (No. 74). In this structure, rare-earth atoms enter the Mg site. Aluminium sites are empty for REB_{25}. Both metal sites of REAlB_{14} structure have partial occupancies of about 60–70%, which shows that the compounds are actually non-stoichiometric. The REB_{25} formula merely reflects the average atomic ratio [B]/[RE] = 25. Yttrium borides form both YAlB_{14} and YB_{25} structures. Experiments have confirmed that the borides based on rare-earth elements from Tb to Lu can have the REAlB_{14} structure. A subset of these borides, which contains rare-earth elements from Gd to Er, can also crystallize in the REB_{25} structure.

Korsukova et al. analyzed the YAlB_{14} crystal structure using a single crystal grown by the high-temperature solution-growth method. The lattice constants were deduced as a = 0.58212(3), b = 1.04130(8) and c = 0.81947(6) nm, and the atomic coordinates and site occupancies are summarized in table I.

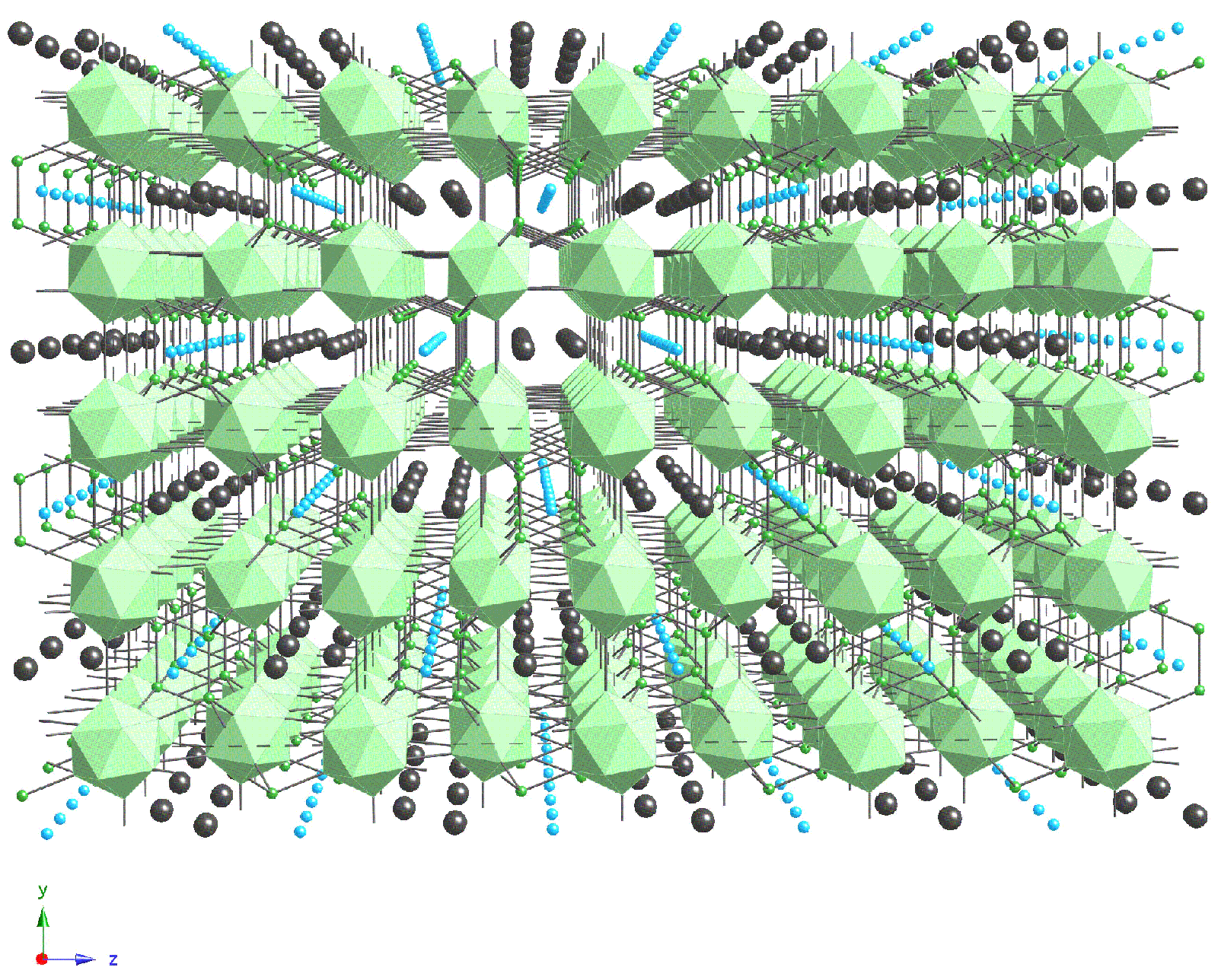
Fig. 3. Crystal structure of YAlB_{14}. Black and blue spheres indicate Y and Al atoms, respectively. Vacancies at the Y and Al sites are ignored.

Figure 3 shows the crystal structure of YAlB_{14} viewed along the x-axis. The large black spheres are Y atoms, the small blue spheres are Al atoms and the small green spheres are the bridging boron sites; B_{12} clusters are depicted as the green icosahedra. Boron framework of YAlB_{14} is one of the simplest among icosahedron-based borides – it consists of only one kind of icosahedra and one bridging boron site. The bridging boron site is tetrahedrally coordinated by four boron atoms. Those atoms are another boron atom in the counter bridge site and three equatorial boron atoms of one of three B_{12} icosahedra. Aluminium atoms are separated by 0.2911 nm and are arranged in lines parallel to the x-axis, whereas yttrium atoms are separated by 0.3405 nm. Both the Y atoms and B_{12} icosahedra form zigzags along the x-axis. The bridging boron atoms connect three equatorial boron atoms of three icosahedra and those icosahedra make up a network parallel to the (101) crystal plane (x-z plane in the figure). The bonding distance between the bridging boron and the equatorial boron atoms is 0.1755 nm, which is typical for the strong covalent B-B bond (bond length 0.17–0.18 nm); thus, the bridging boron atoms strengthen the individual network planes. On the other hand, the large distance between the boron atoms within the bridge (0.2041 nm) suggests weaker interaction, and thus the bridging sites contribute little to the bonding between the network planes.

The boron framework of YAlB_{14} needs donation of four electrons from metal elements: two electrons for a B_{12} icosahedron and one electron for each of the two bridging boron atoms – to support their tetrahedral coordination. The actual chemical composition of YAlB_{14}, determined by the structure analysis, is Y_{0.62}Al_{0.71}B_{14} as described in table I. If both metal elements are trivalent ions then 3.99 electrons can be transferred to the boron framework, which is very close to the required value of 4. However, because the bonding between the bridging boron atoms is weaker than in a typical B-B covalent bond, less than 2 electrons are donated to this bond, and metal atoms need not be trivalent. On the other hand, the electron transfer from metal atoms to the boron framework implies that not only strong covalent B-B bonding within the framework but also ionic interaction between metal atoms and the framework contribute to the YAlB_{14} phase stabilization.

== REB_{66}-type borides ==
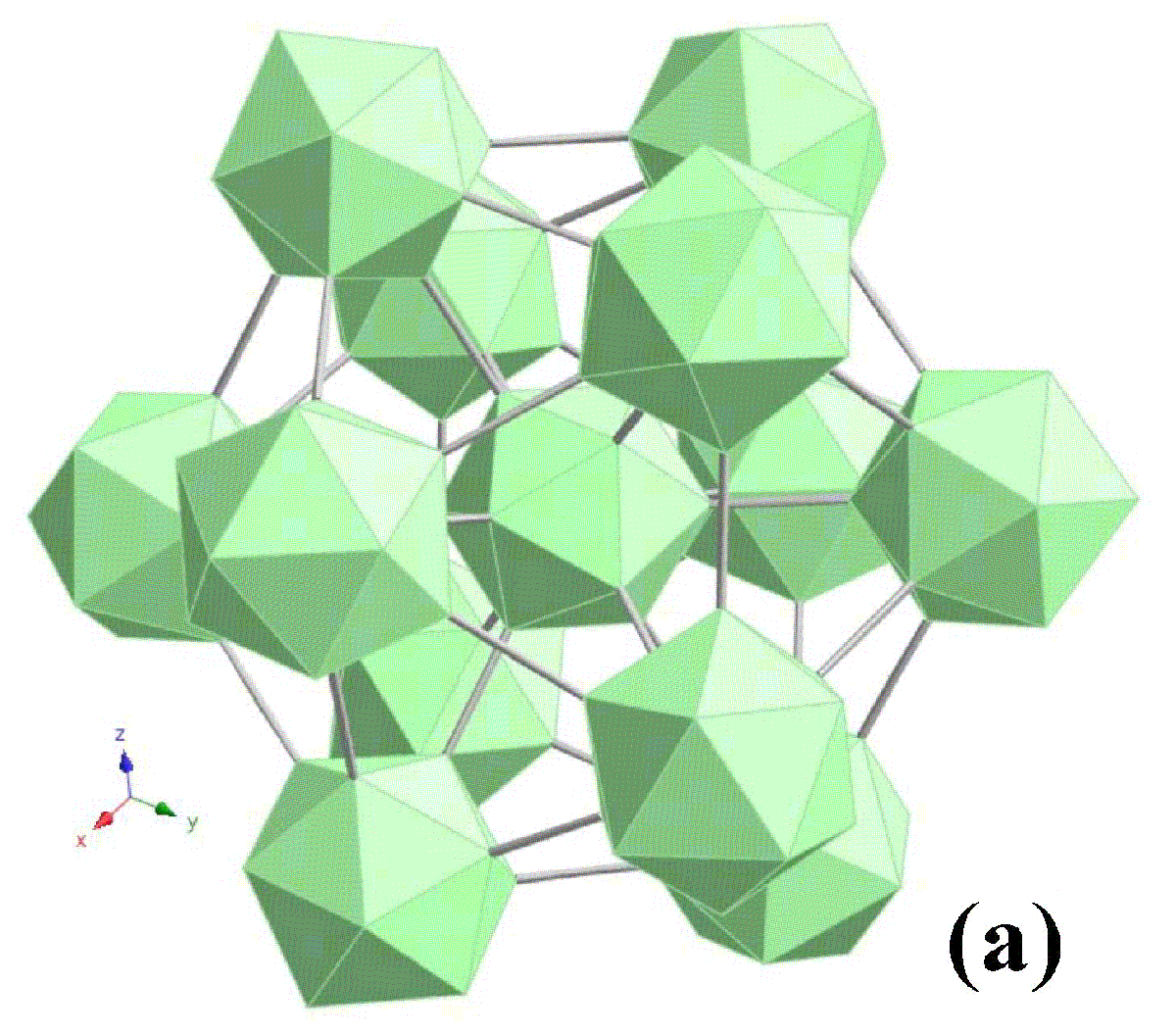
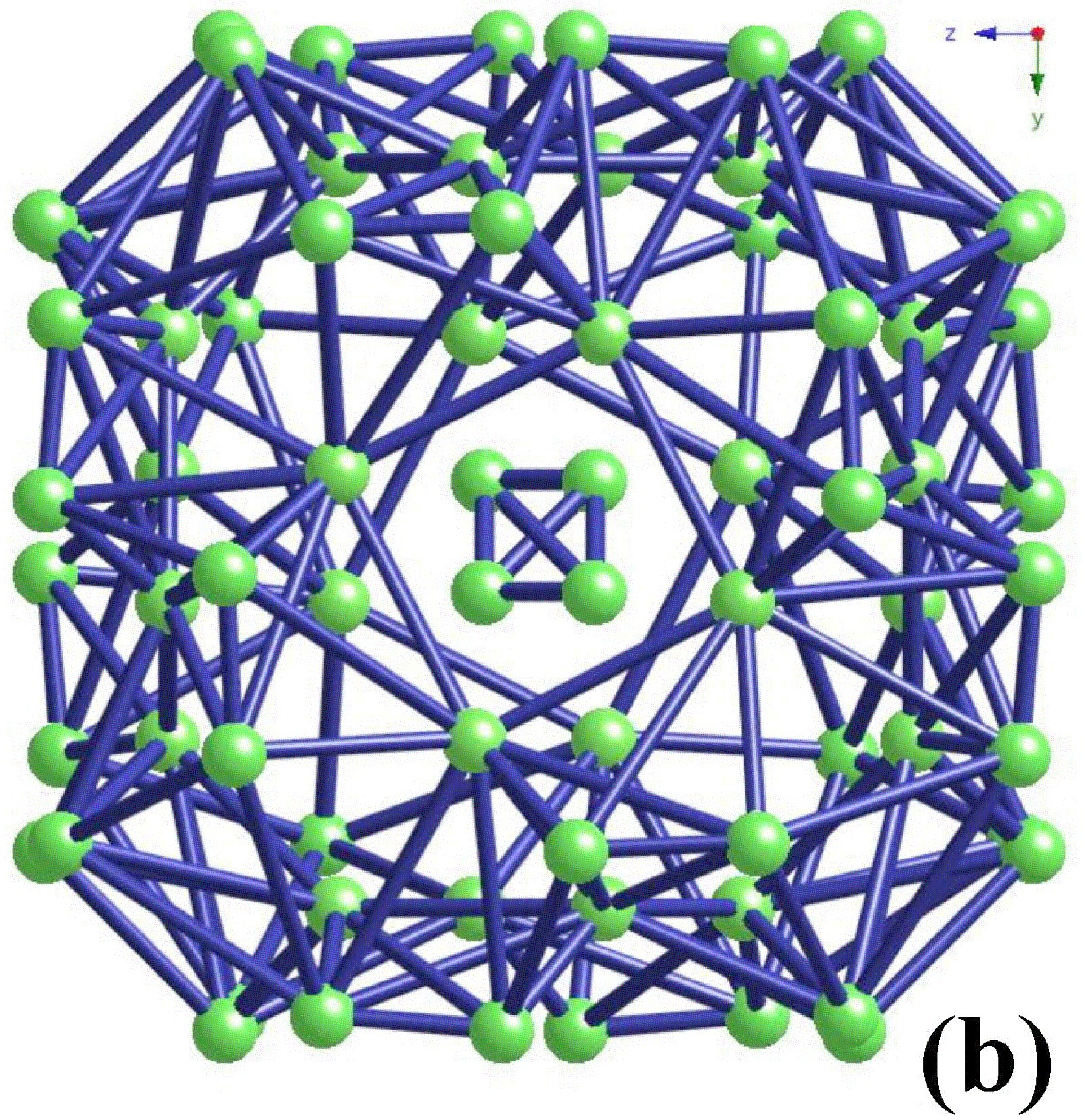
Fig. 4. (a) Thirteen-icosahedron unit (B_{12})_{13}B_{12} (supericosahedron), and (b) B_{80} cluster unit. The excessive bonding in panel (b) is because it assumes that all sites are occupied, whereas the total number of boron atoms is only 42.

In addition to yttrium, a wide range of rare-earth elements from Nd to Lu, except for Eu, can form REB_{66} compounds. Seybolt discovered the compound YB_{66} in 1960 and its structure was solved by Richards and Kasper in 1969. They reported that YB_{66} has a face-centered cubic structure with space group Fm3̅c (No. 226) and lattice constant a = 2.3440(6) nm. There are 13 boron sites B1–B13 and one yttrium site. The B1 sites form one icosahedron and the B2–B9 sites make up another icosahedron. These icosahedra arrange in a thirteen-icosahedron unit (B_{12})_{12}B_{12} which is shown in figure 4a and is called supericosahedron. The icosahedron formed by the B1 site atoms is located at the center of the supericosahedron. The supericosahedron is one of the basic units of the boron framework of YB_{66}. There are two types of supericosahedra: one occupies the cubic face centers and another, which is rotated by 90°, is located at the center of the cell and at the cell edges. Thus, there are eight supericosahedra (1248 boron atoms) in the unit cell.

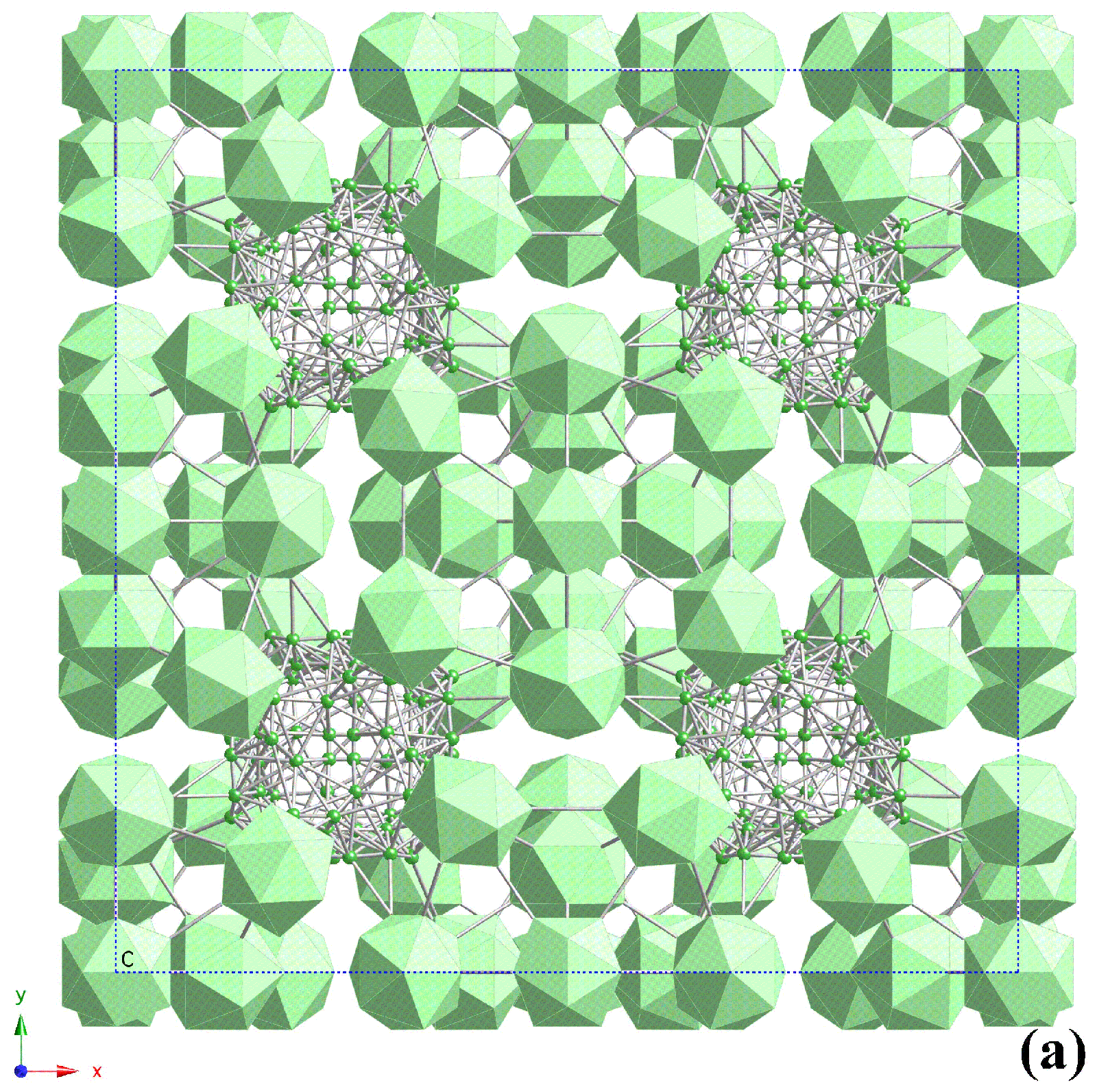
Fig. 5a The boron framework of YB_{66} viewed along the z-axis.

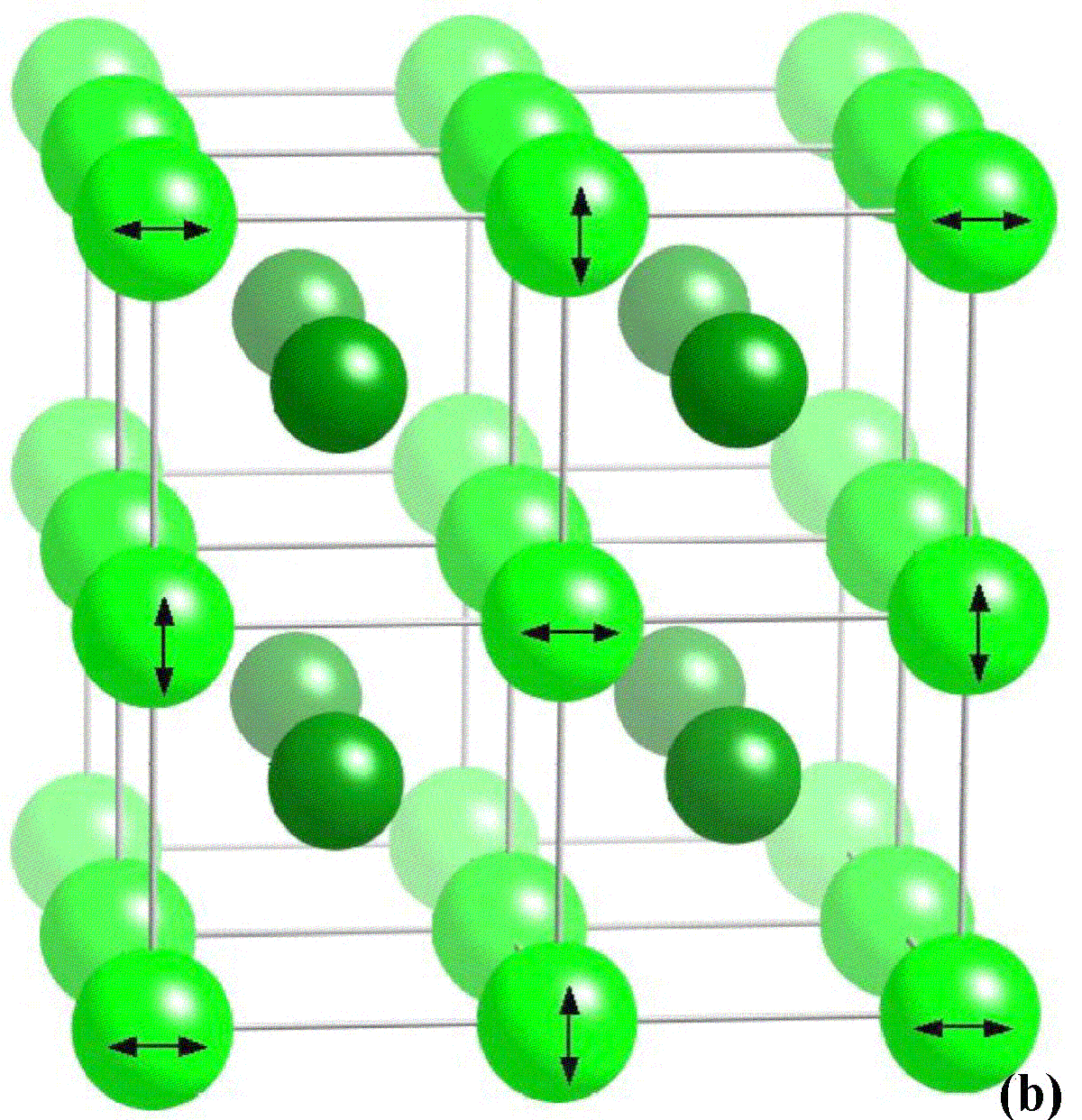
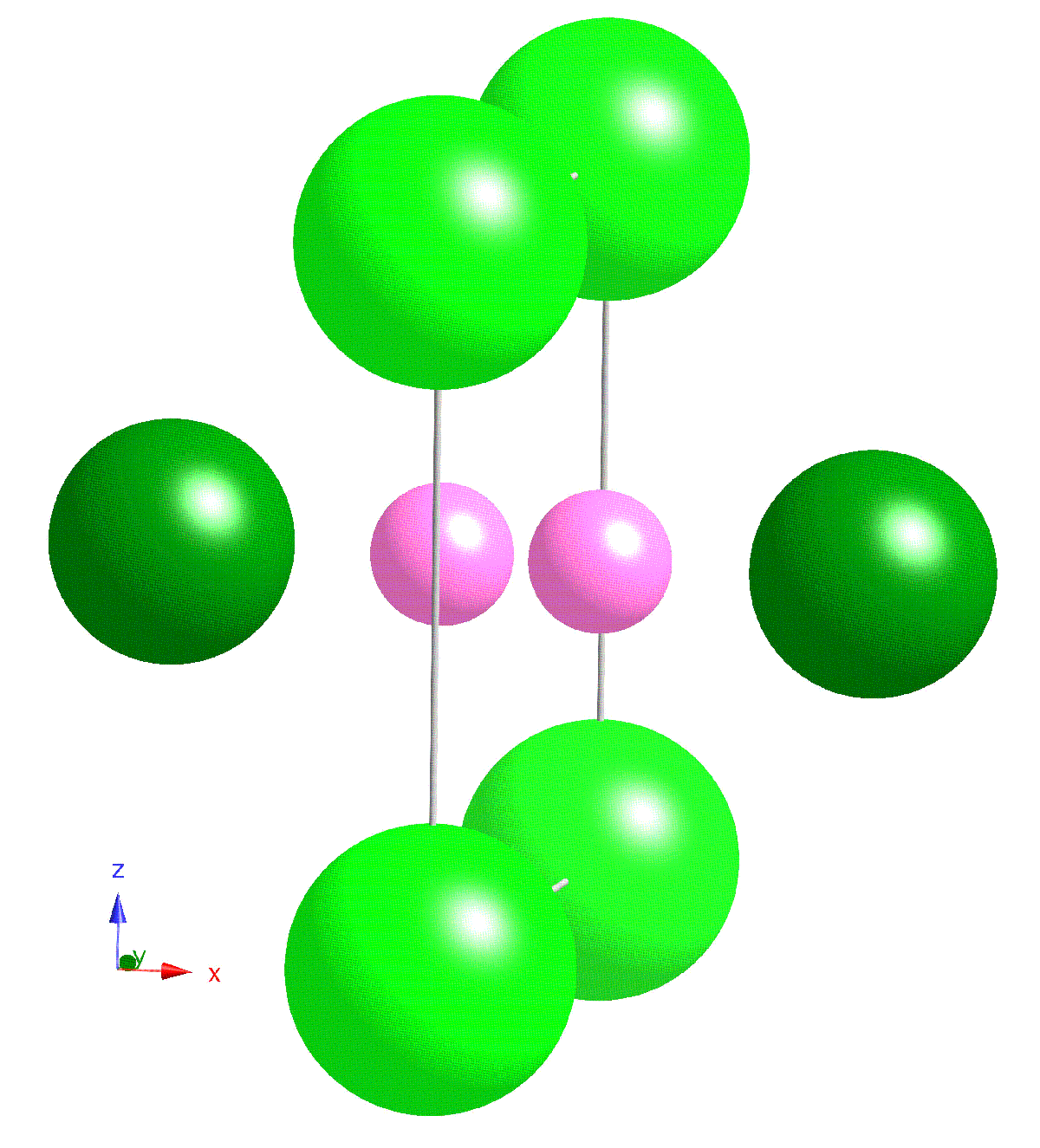
Fig. 5b. Schematically drawn boron framework of YB_{66}. Light green spheres show the boron supericosahedra and their relative orientations are indicated by arrows. Dark green spheres correspond to the B_{80} clusters. Fig. 6. Pair of Y sites (pink spheres) in YB_{66}. Light green spheres show the boron supericosahedron and dark green spheres correspond to the B_{80} clusters.

Number of B, Y and Mo or Pt atoms in the unit cell deduced from chemical composition, lattice constant and density (experiment).
Composition	a(nm)	ρ(g/cm^{3})	N_{B}	N_{y}	N_{Mo/Pt}
YB_{66}	2.3440	2.52	1610	24.4	–
YB_{61.754}	2.3445	2.5687	1628	26.4	–
YB_{62}	2.34364	2.5662	1624	26.2	–
YB_{56}	2.34600	2.5927	1626	29.0	–
YMo_{0.20}B_{62.4}	2.34258	2.64	1628	26.1	5.3
YPt_{0.091}B_{63.5}	2.34300	2.6344	1634	25.7	2.4
YPt_{0.096}B_{63.3}	2.34223	2.6355	1630	25.7	2.5
YPt_{0.14}B_{62.0}	2.34055	2.6762	1629	26.3	3.7

Another structure unit of YB_{66}, shown in figure 4b, is B_{80} cluster of 80 boron sites formed by the B10 to B13 sites. All those 80 sites are partially occupied and in total contain only about 42 boron atoms. The B_{80} cluster is located at the body center of the octant of the unit cell, i.e., at the 8a position (1/4, 1/4, 1/4); thus, there are eight such clusters (336 boron atoms) per unit cell. Two independent structure analyses came to the same conclusion that the total number of boron atoms in the unit cell is 1584. The boron framework structure of YB_{66} is shown in figure 5a. To indicate relative orientations of the supericosahedra, a schematic drawing is shown in figure 5b, where the supericosahedra and the B_{80} clusters are depicted by light green and dark green spheres, respectively; at the top surface of the unit cell, the relative orientations of the supericosahedra are indicated by arrows. There are 48 yttrium sites ((0.0563, 1/4, 1/4) for YB_{62}) in the unit cell. Richards and Kasper fixed the Y site occupancy to 0.5 that resulted in 24 Y atoms in the unit cell and the chemical composition of YB_{66}. As shown in figure 6, Y sites form a pair separated by only 0.264 nm in YB_{62}. This pair is aligned normal to the plane formed by four supericosahedra. The Y site occupancy 0.5 implies that the pair has always one Y atom with one empty site.

x-coordinates and occupancies of the Y1 and Y2 sites.
Atom	x	Occupancy
Y1	0.0542(3)	0.437(9)
Y2	0.0725(11)	0.110(12)

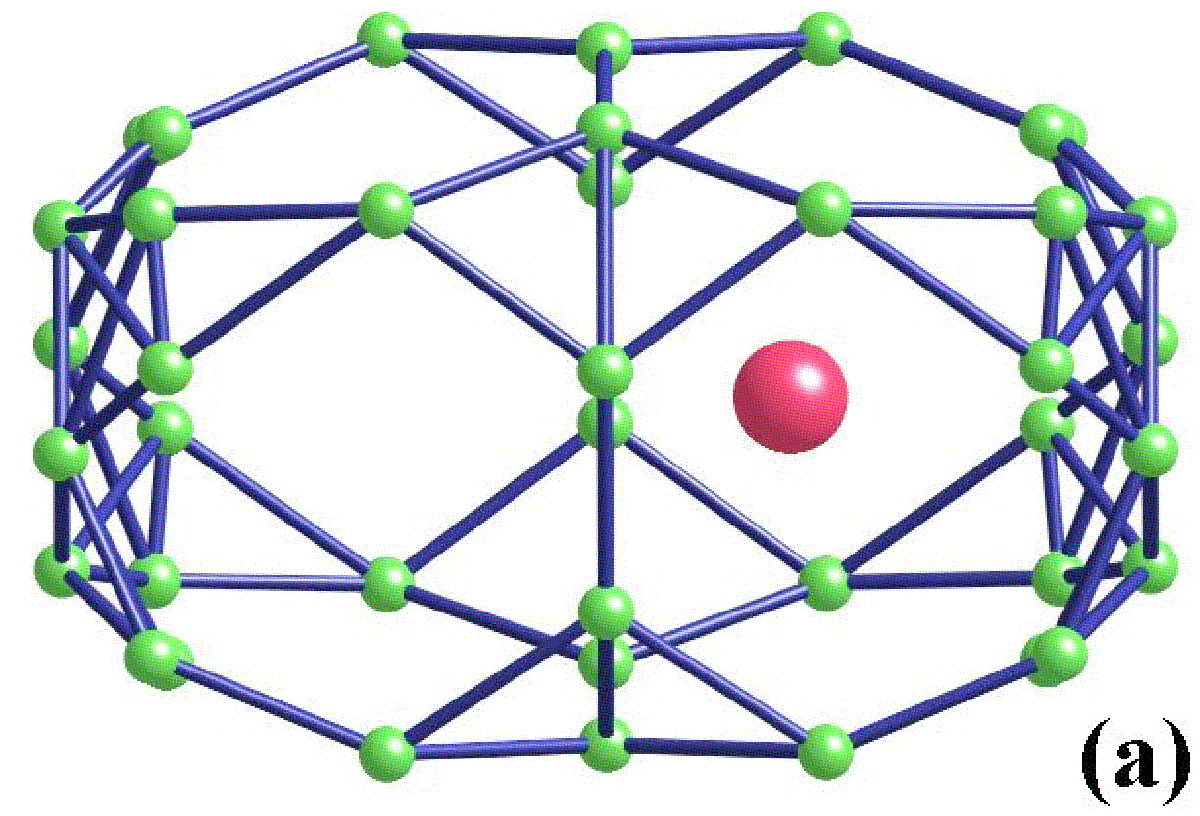
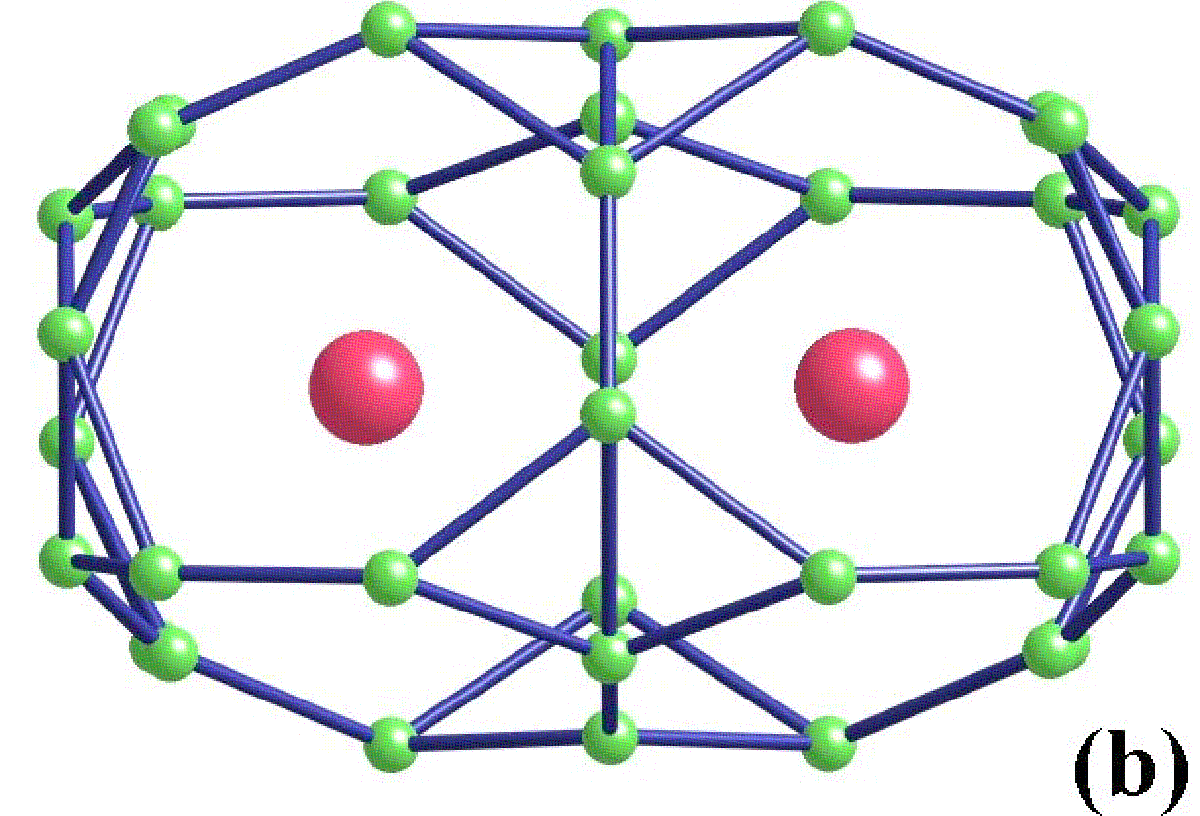
Fig. 7. Two cases of the Y pair sites: with one Y atom (top) and two Y atoms (bottom). In the latter case, some neighboring boron sites are eliminated because they are too close to the Y site.

Slack et al. reported that the total number of boron atoms in the unit cell, calculated from the measured values of density, chemical composition and lattice constant, is 1628 ± 4, which is larger than the value 1584 obtained from the structural analysis. The number of B atoms in the unit cell remains nearly constant when the chemical composition changes from YB_{56} to YB_{66}. On the other hand, the total number of yttrium atoms per unit cell varies, and it is, for example, ~26.3 for YB_{62} (see right table). If the total number of Y atoms stays below or equal to 24 then it is possible that one Y atom accommodates in each Y pair (partial occupancy). However, the experimental value of 26.3 significantly exceeds 24, and thus both pair sites might be occupied. In this case, because of the small separation between the two Y atoms, they must be repelled by the Coulomb force. To clarify this point, split Y sites were introduced in the structure analysis resulting in a better agreement with the experiment. The Y site distances and occupancies are presented in the left table.

There are twenty Y pair sites with one Y atom and three pairs with two Y atoms; there is also one empty Y pair (partial occupancy = 0). The separation 0.340 nm for the Y2 pair site (two Y atoms in the pair site) is much larger than the separation 0.254 nm for the Y1 pair site (one Y atom in the pair site), as expected. The total number of Y atoms in the unit cell is 26.3, exactly as measured. Both cases are compared in figure 7. The larger separation for the Y2 pair site is clear as compared with that for the Y1 pair site. In case of the Y2 pair, some neighboring boron sites that belong to the B_{80} cluster must be unoccupied because they are too close to the Y2 site.

Splitting the Y site yields right number of Y atoms in the unit cell, but not B atoms. Not only the occupation of the B sites in the B_{80} cluster must be strongly dependent on whether or not the Y site is the Y1 state or the Y2 state, but also the position of the occupied B sites must be affected by the state of the Y site. Atomic coordinates and site occupancies are summarized in table II.

== REB_{41}Si_{1.2} ==
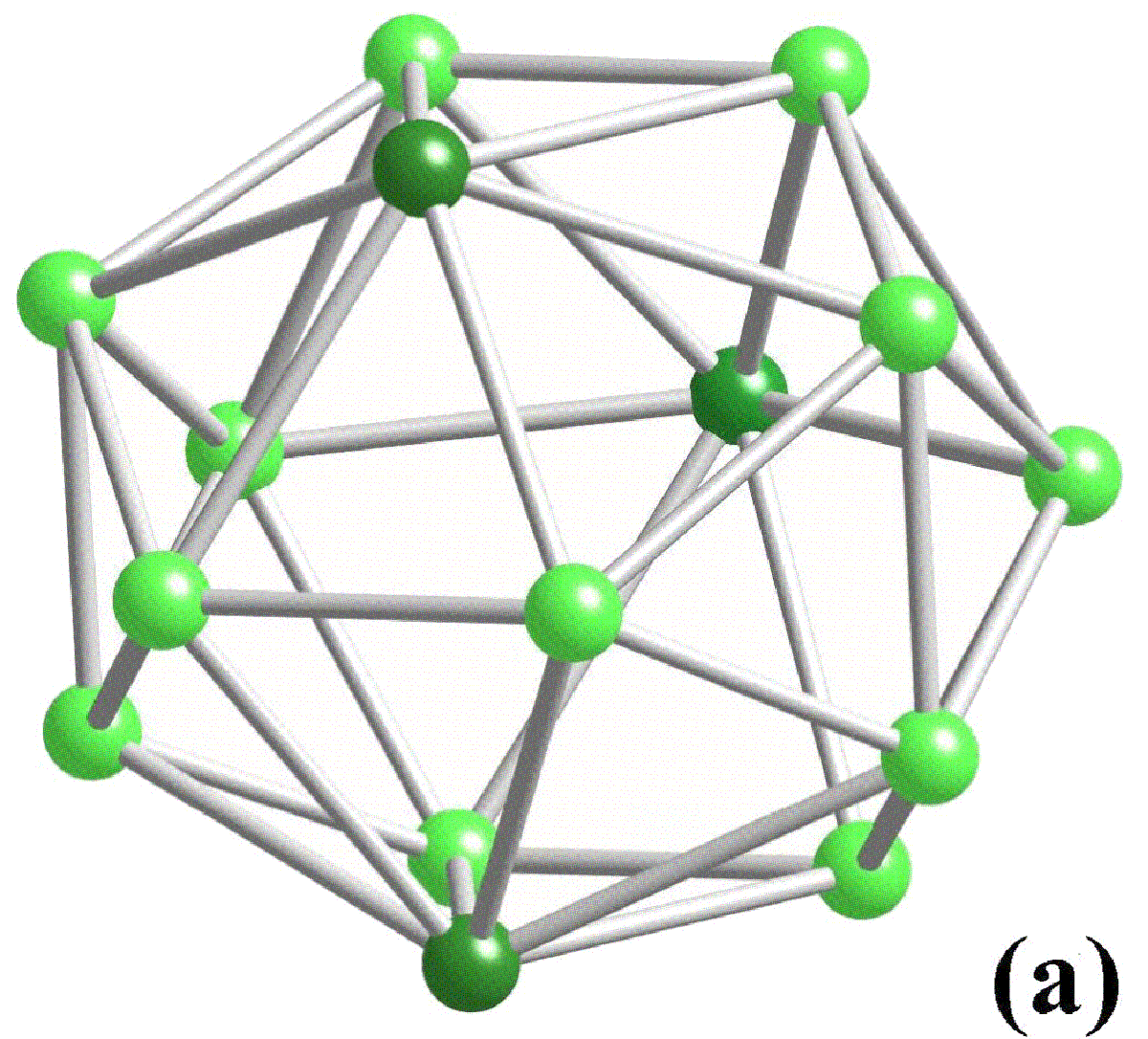
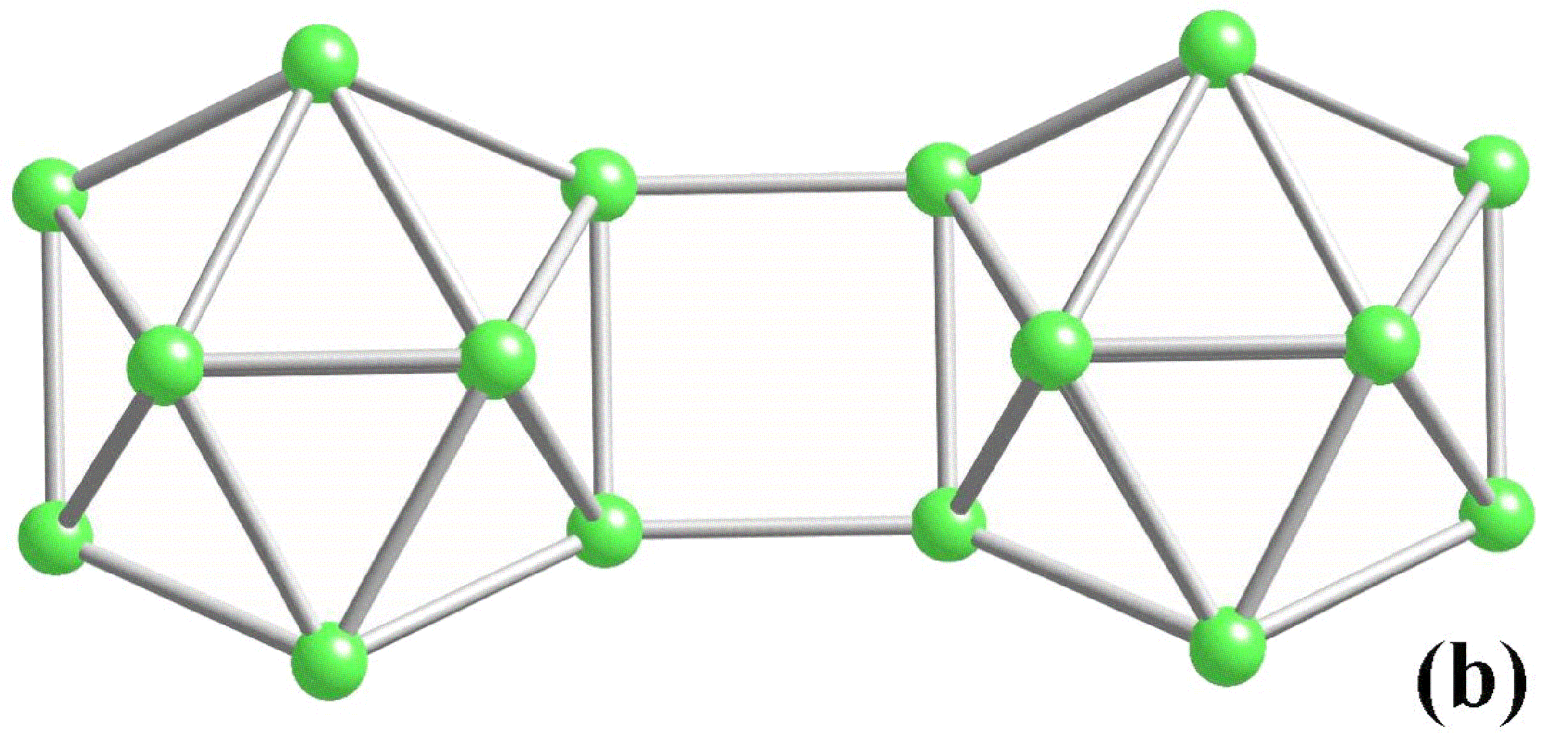
Fig. 8. (a) B_{12}Si_{3} polyhedron unit. Darker green spheres represent the sites which are occupied either by Si or B atoms. (b) Unusual linkage between the B_{12}-I5 icosahedra connected via two apex atoms of each icosahedron.
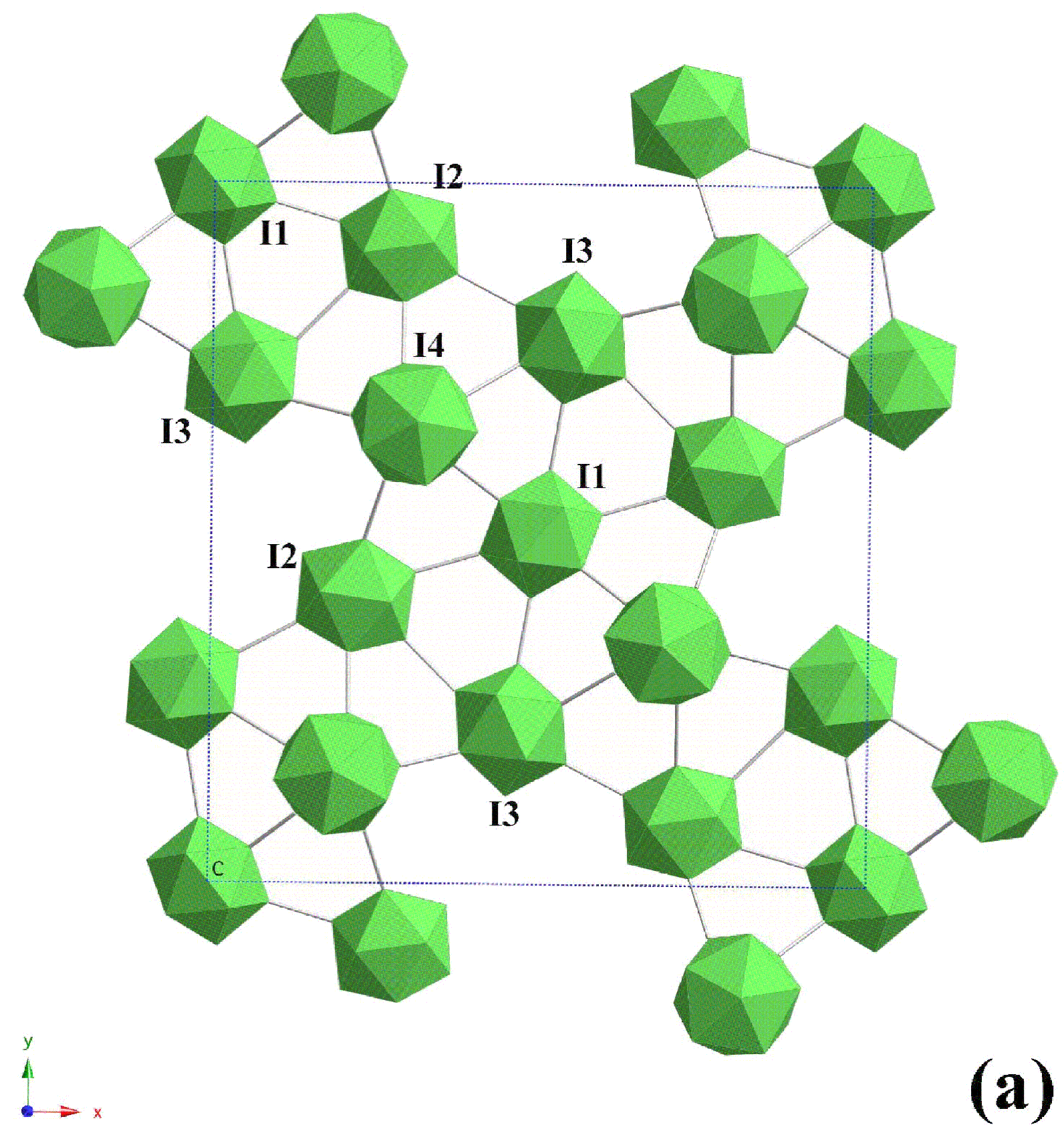
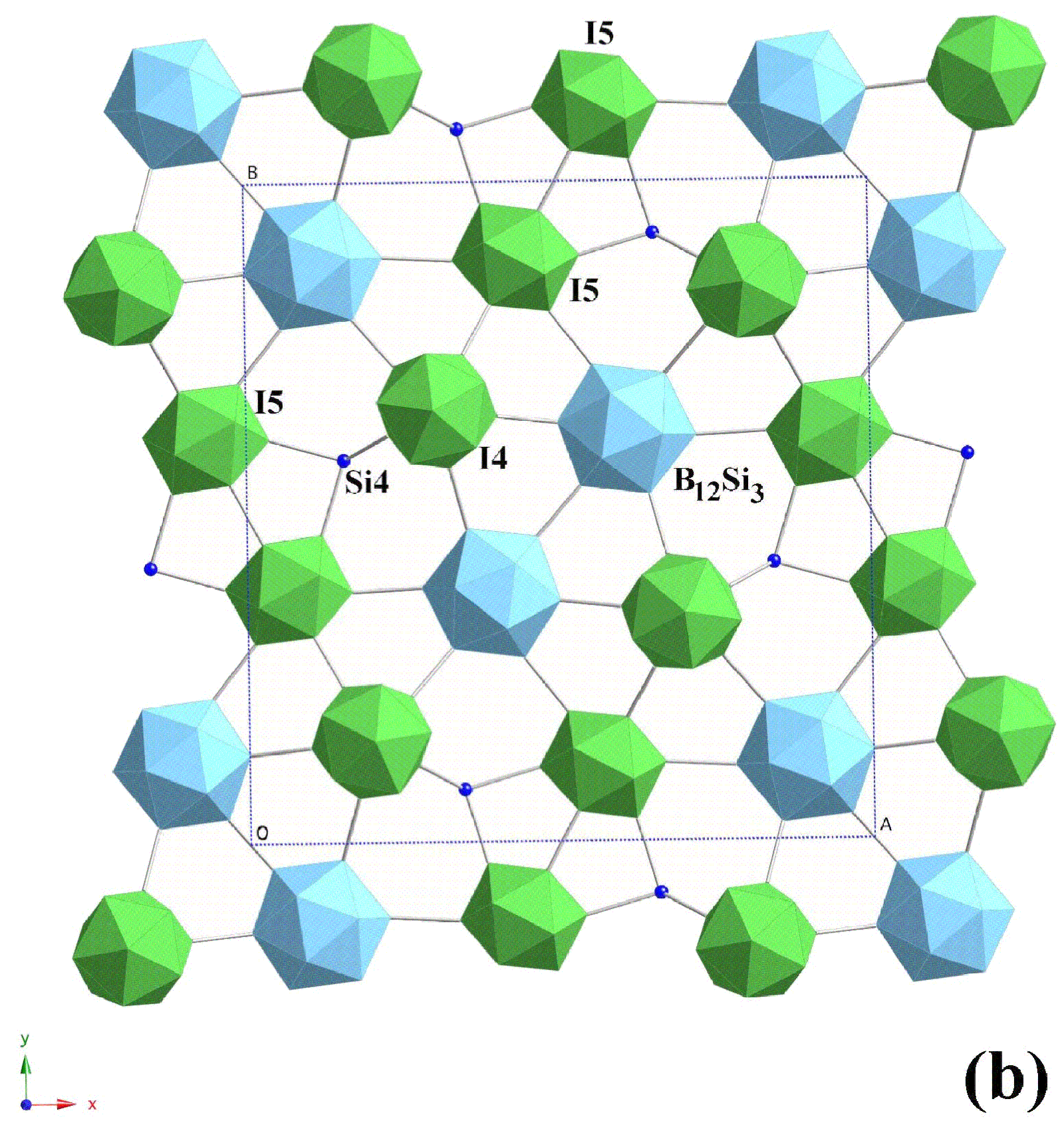
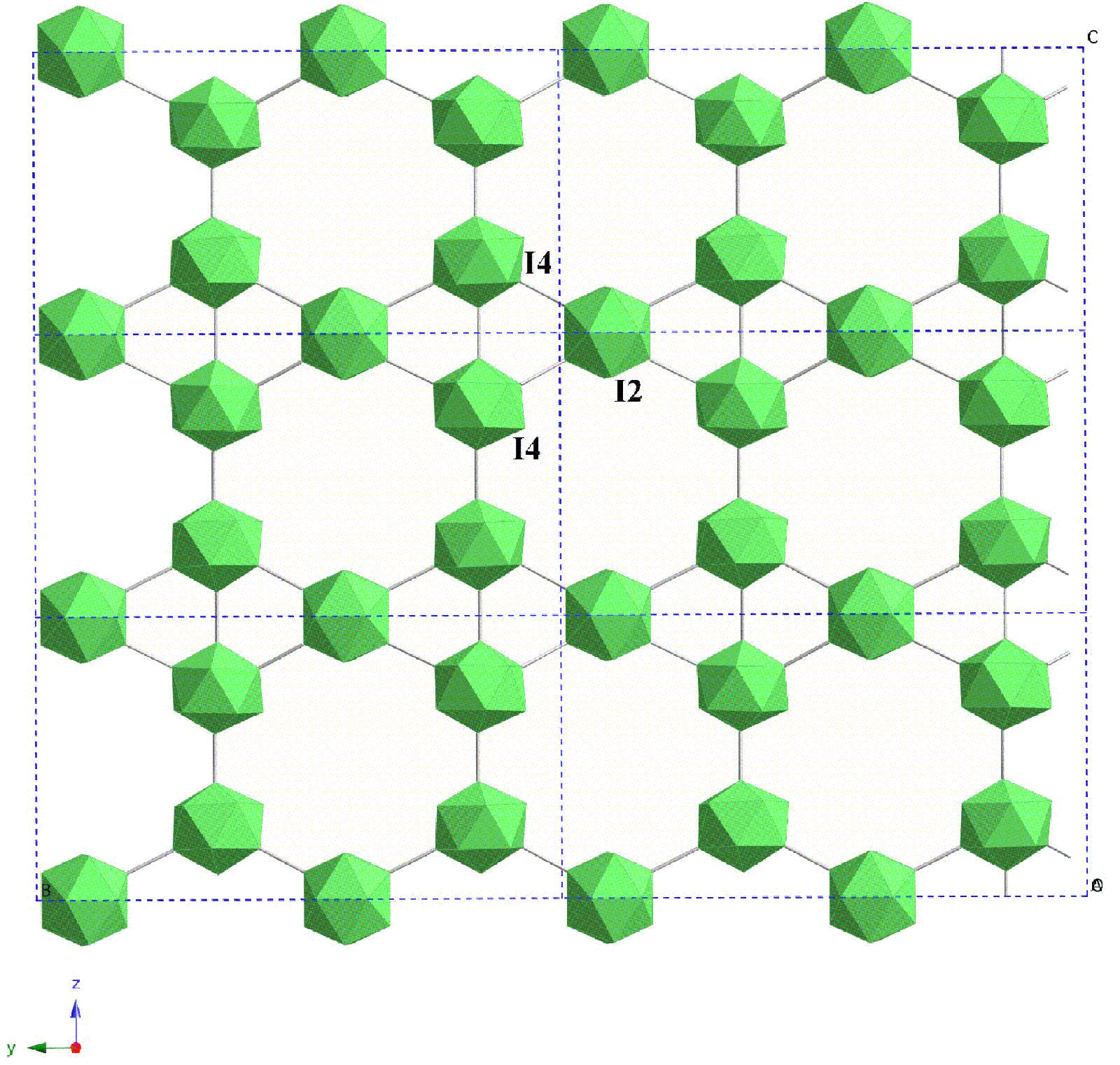
Fig. 9. (a) The boron network that consists of the icosahedra I1, I2 and I3 and is located at z = 0 plane. The icosahedron I4 lies above and below of this network at z = ± 0.25. (b) The boron network that consists of the I5 icosahedron and B_{12}Si_{3} polyhedron (blue) and is located at z = 0.5 plane. The icosahedron I4 lies above and below this network at z = 0.25 and 0.75. Fig. 10. The b-c network formed by icosahedra I4 and I2 as seen along the a-axis. The network is drawn within the range x = 0.09–0.41.

Similar to yttrium, rare-earth metals from Gd to Lu can form REB_{41}Si_{1.2}-type boride. The first such compound was synthesized by solid-state reaction and its structure was deduced as YB_{50}. X-ray powder diffraction (XRD) and electron diffraction indicated that YB_{50} has an orthorhombic structure with lattice constants a = 1.66251(9), b = 1.76198 and c = 0.94797(3) nm. The space group was assigned as P2_{1}2_{1}2. Because of the close similarity in lattice constants and space group, one might expect that YB_{50} has the γ-AlB_{12}-type orthorhombic structure whose lattice constants and space group are a = 1.6573(4), b = 1.7510(3) and c = 1.0144(1) nm and P2_{1}2_{1}2. YB_{50} decomposes at ~1750 °C without melting that hinders growth of single crystals from the melt. Small addition of silicon made YB_{50} to melt without decomposition, and so enabled single-crystal growth from the melt and single-crystal structure analysis.

The structure analysis indicated that YB_{41}Si_{1.2} has not the γ-AlB_{12}-type lattice but a rare orthorhombic crystal structure (space group: Pbam, No. 55) with lattice constants of a = 1.674(1) nm, b = 1.7667(1) nm and c = 0.9511(7) nm. There are 58 independent atomic sites in the unit cell. Three of them are occupied by either B or Si atoms (mixed-occupancy sites), one is a Si bridge site and one is Y site. From the remaining 53 boron sites, 48 form icosahedra and 5 are bridging sites. Atomic coordinates and site occupancies are summarized in table III.

The boron framework of YB_{41}Si_{1.2} consists of five B_{12} icosahedra (I1–I5) and a B_{12}Si_{3} polyhedron shown in figure 8a. An unusual linkage is depicted in figure 8b, where two B_{12}-I5 icosahedra connect via two B atoms of each icosahedron forming an imperfect square. The boron framework of YB_{41}Si_{1.2} can be described as a layered structure where two boron networks (figures 9a,b) stack along the z-axis. One boron network consists of 3 icosahedra I1, I2 and I3 and is located in the z = 0 plane; another network consists of the icosahedron I5 and the B_{12}Si_{3} polyhedron and lies at z = 0.5. The icosahedron I4 bridges these networks, and thus its height along the z-axis is 0.25.

The I4 icosahedra link two networks along the c-axis and therefore form an infinite chain of icosahedra along this axis as shown in figure 10. The unusually short distances (0.4733 and 0.4788 nm) between the neighboring icosahedra in this direction result in the relatively small c-axis lattice constant of 0.95110(7) nm in this compound – other borides with a similar icosahedral chain have this value larger than 1.0 nm. However, the bonding distances between the apex B atoms (0.1619 and 0.1674 nm) of neighboring I4 icosahedra are usual for the considered metal borides.

Another unusual feature of YB_{41}Si_{1.2} is the 100% occupancy of the Y site. In most icosahedron-based metal borides, metal sites have rather low site occupancy, for example, about 50% for YB_{66} and 60–70% for REAlB_{14}. When the Y site is replaced by rare-earth elements, REB_{41}Si_{1.2} can have an antiferromagnetic-like ordering because of this high site occupancy.

== Homologous icosahedron-based rare-earth borides ==
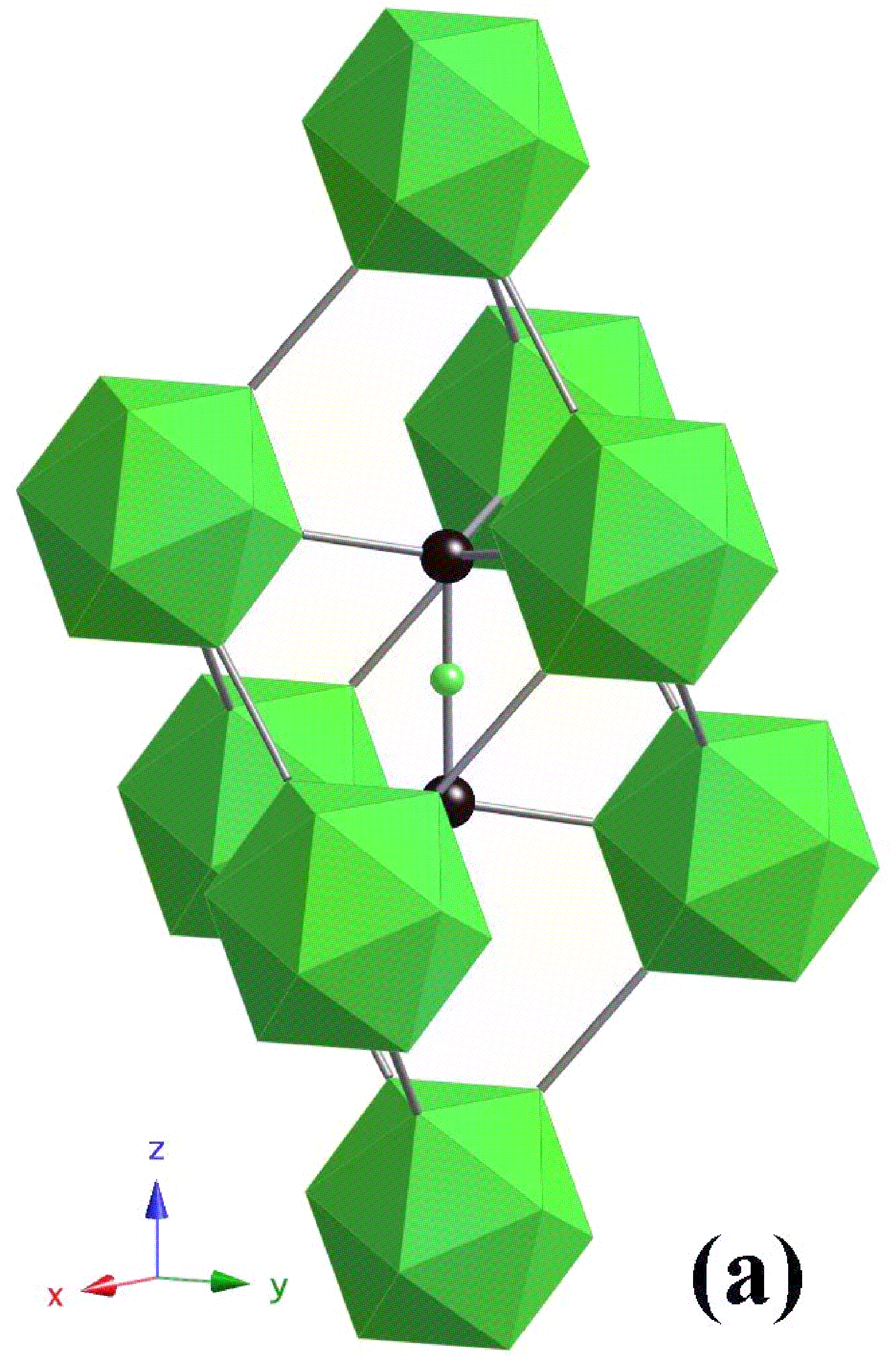
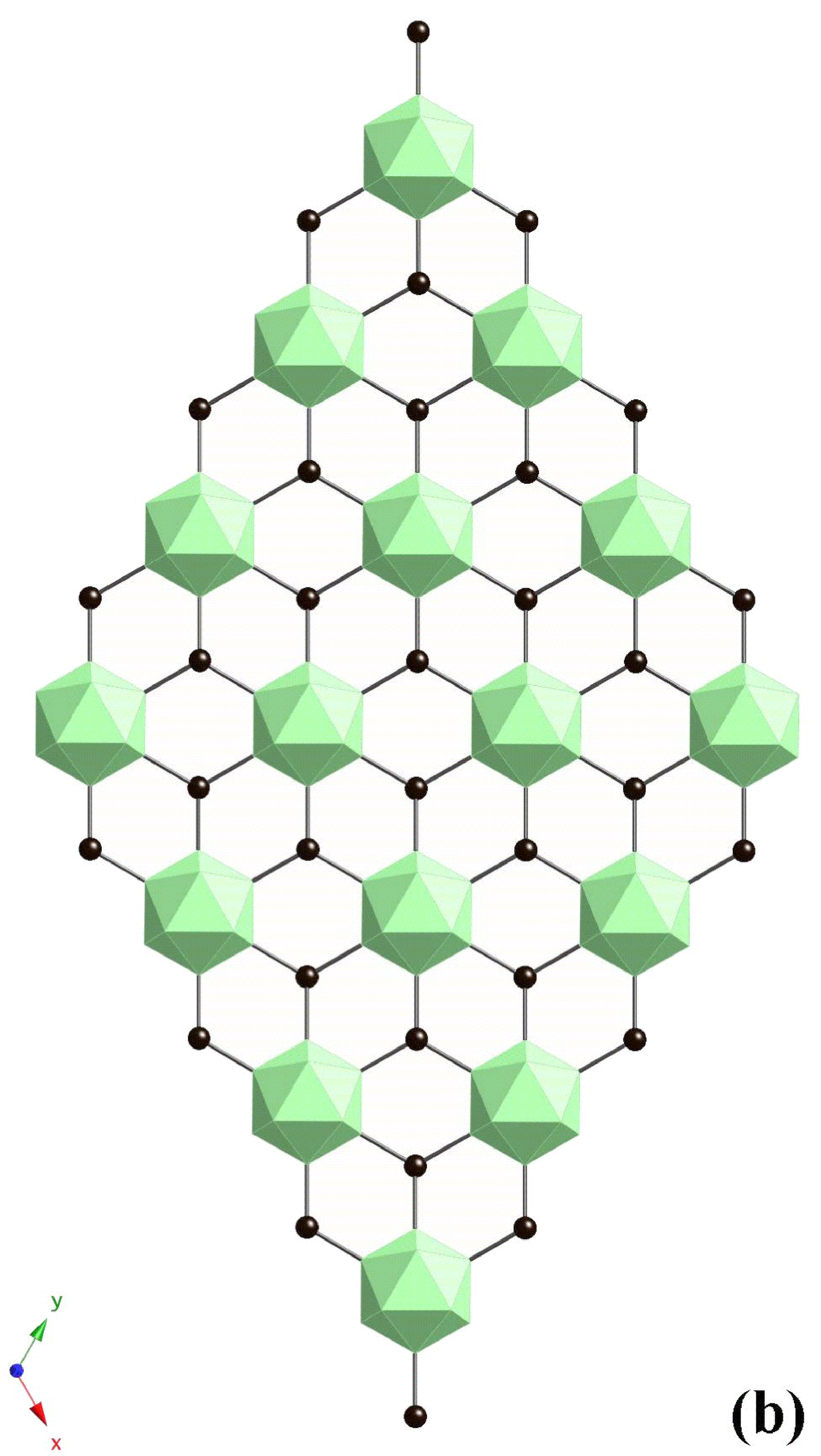
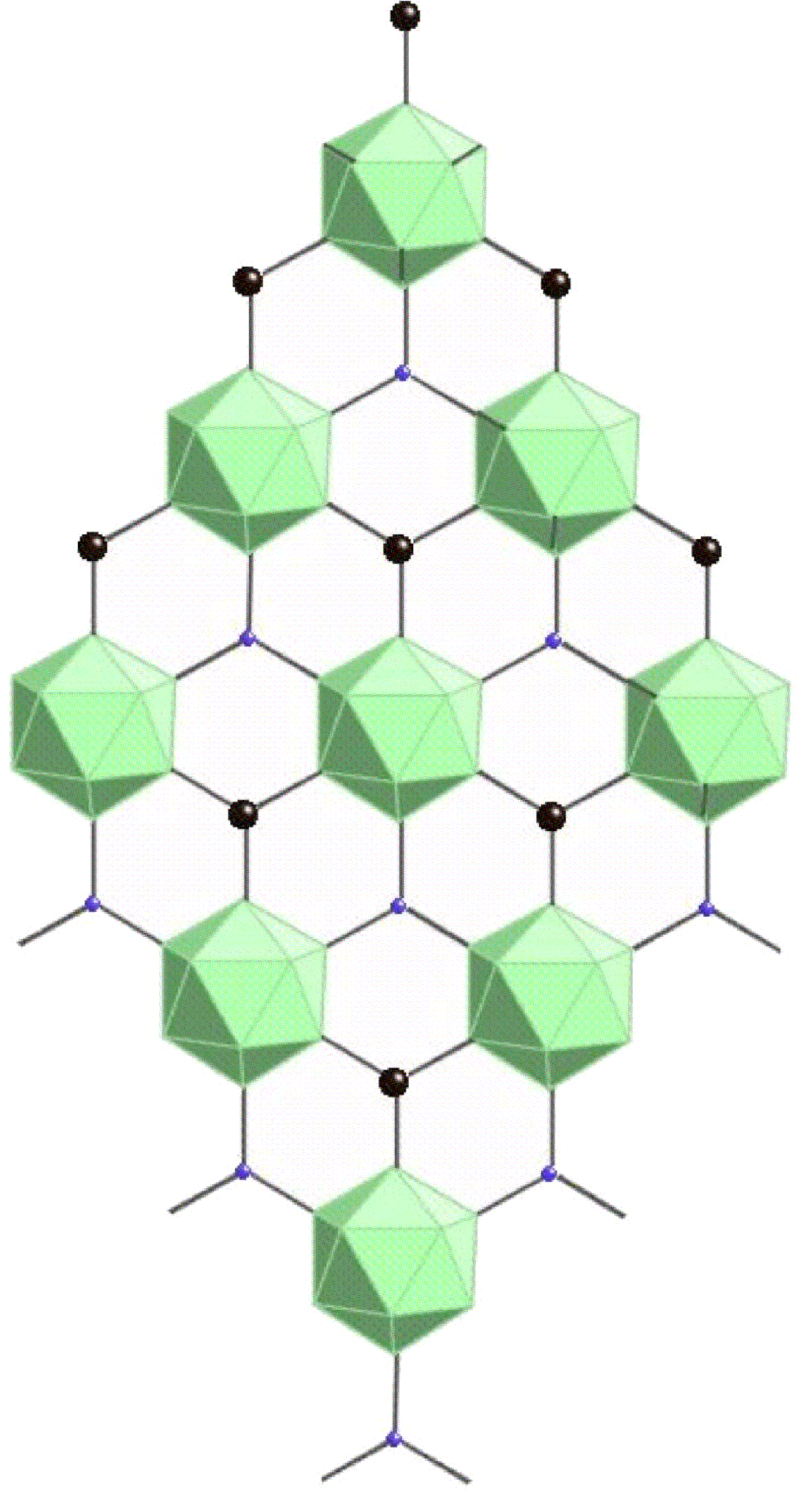
Fig. 11. (a) Structure unit of B_{4}C and (b) c-plane network of B_{12} icosahedra in the B_{4}C structure. Fig. 13. B_{12} icosahedron network bridged by nitrogen (blue) and carbon (black) atoms.

Rare-earth borides REB_{15.5}CN, REB_{22}C_{2}N and REB_{28.5}C_{4} are homologous, i.e. have a similar crystal structure, to B_{4}C. The latter has a structure typical of icosahedron-based borides, as shown in figure 11a. There, B_{12} icosahedra form a rhombohedral lattice unit (space group: R3̅m (No. 166), lattice constants: a = 0.56 nm and c = 1.212 nm) surrounding a C-B-C chain that resides at the center of the lattice unit, and both C atoms bridge the neighboring three icosahedra. This structure is layered: as shown in figure 11b, B_{12} icosahedra and bridging carbons form a network plane that spreads parallel to the c-plane and stacks along the c-axis.

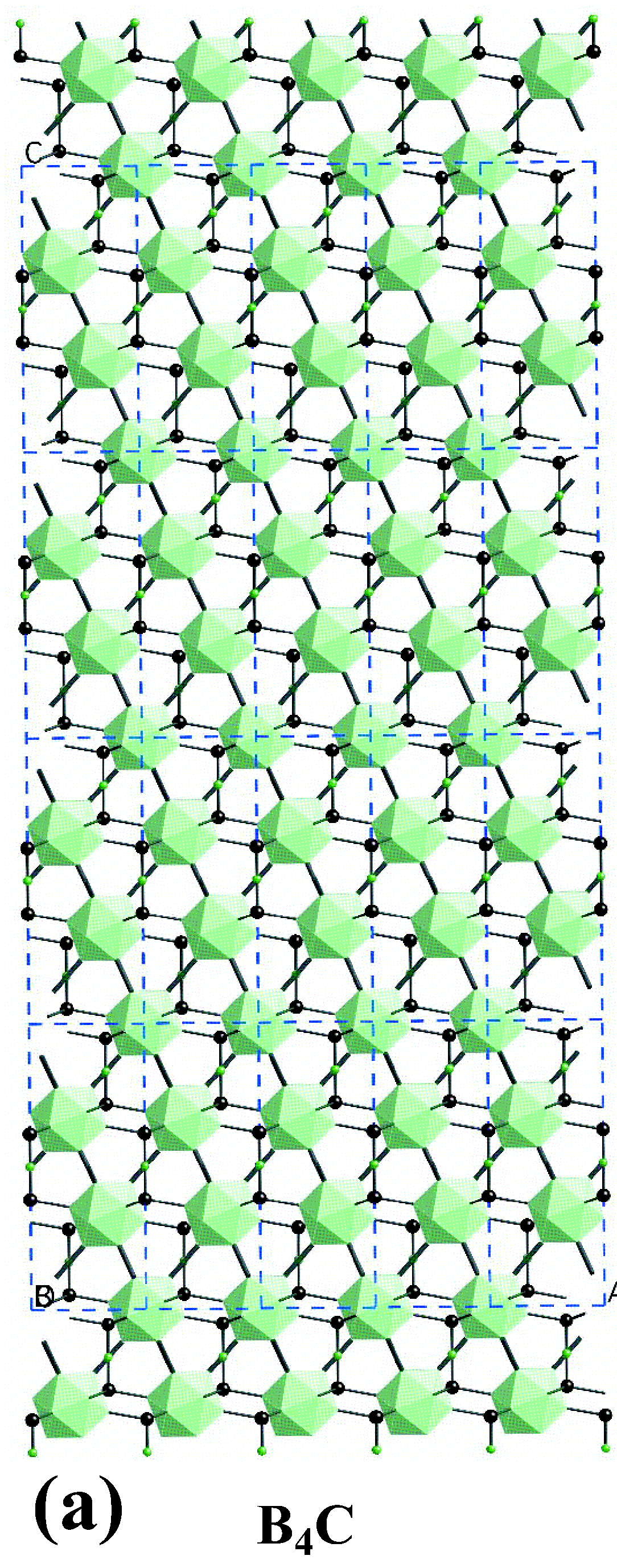
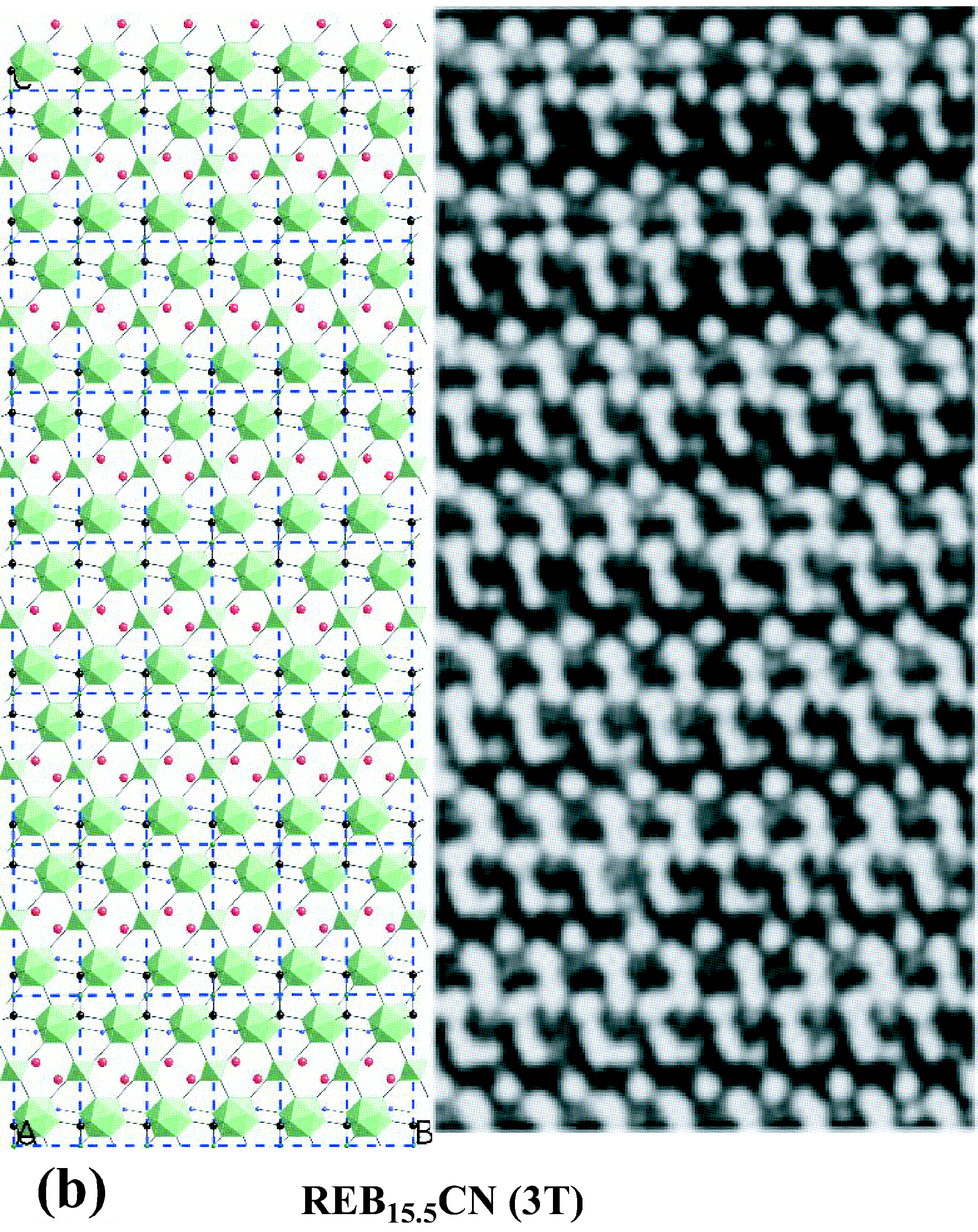
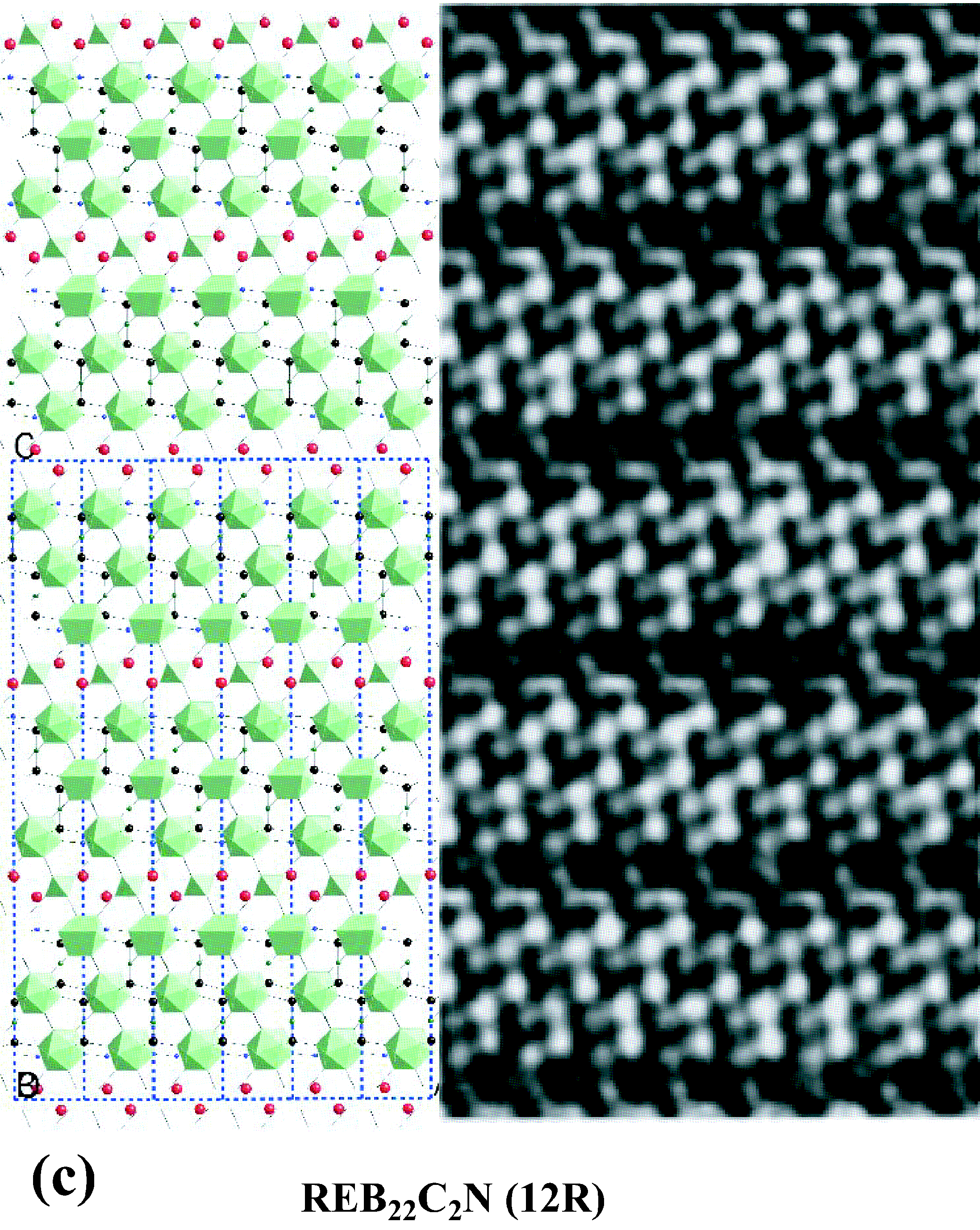
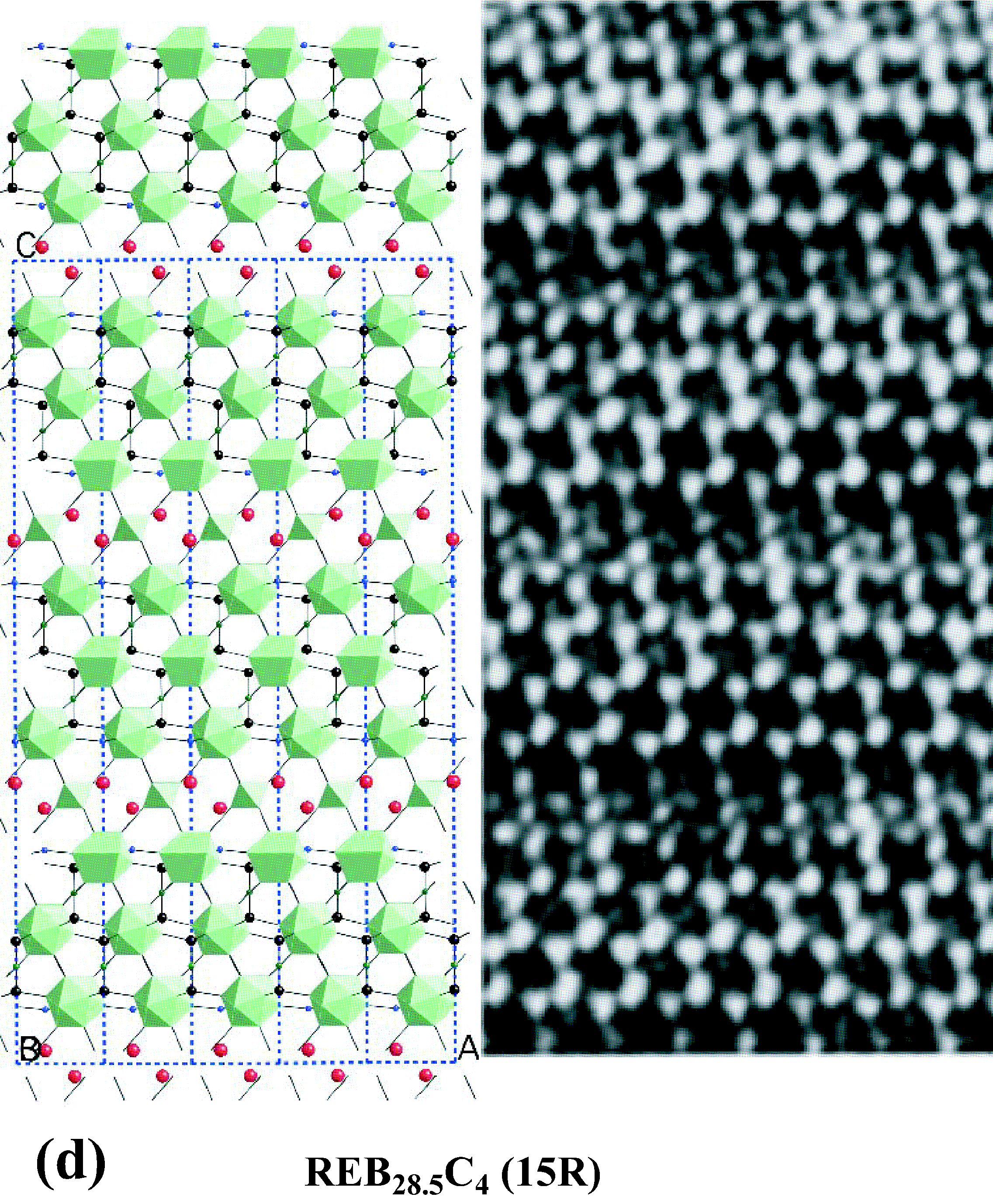
Fig. 12. Stacking sequences of homologous icosahedron-based rare-earth borides and their HRTEM lattice images; (a) B_{4}C, (b) REB_{15.5}CN (3T), (c) REB_{22}C_{2}N (12R) and (d) REB_{28.5}C_{4} (15R). Red circles are rare-earth atoms. HRTEM lattice images were obtained for YB_{15.5}CN, YB_{22}C_{2}N and YB_{28.5}C_{4} compounds.

These homologous compounds have two basic structure units – the B_{12} icosahedron and the B_{6} octahedron. The network plane of B_{4}C structure can be periodically replaced by a B_{6} octahedron layer so that replacement of every third, fourth and fifth layer would correspond to REB_{15.5}CN, REB_{22}C_{2}N and REB_{28.5}C_{4}, respectively. The B_{6} octahedron is smaller than the B_{12} icosahedron; therefore, rare-earth elements can reside in the space created by the replacement. The stacking sequences of B_{4}C, REB_{15.5}CN, REB_{22}C_{2}N and REB_{28.5}C_{4} are shown in figures 12a, b, c and d, respectively. High-resolution transmission electron microscopy (HRTEM) lattice images of the latter three compounds, added to Fig. 12, do confirm the stacking sequence of each compound. The symbols 3T, 12R and 15R in brackets indicate the number of layers necessary to complete the stacking sequence, and T and R refer to trigonal and rhombohedral. Thus, REB_{22}C_{2}N and REB_{28.5}C_{4} have rather large c-lattice constants.

Because of the small size of the B_{6} octahedra, they cannot interconnect. Instead, they bond to the B_{12} icosahedra in the neighboring layer, and this decreases bonding strength in the c-plane. Nitrogen atoms strengthen the bonding in the c-plane by bridging three icosahedra, like C atoms in the C-B-C chain. Figure 13 depicts the c-plane network revealing the alternate bridging of the boron icosahedra by N and C atoms. Decreasing the number of the B_{6} octahedra diminishes the role of nitrogen because the C-B-C chains start bridging the icosahedra. On the other hand, in MgB_{9}N the B_{6} octahedron layer and the B_{12} icosahedron layer stack alternatively and there is no C-B-C chains; thus only N atoms bridge the B_{12} icosahedra. However, REB_{9}N compounds have not been identified yet.

Sc, Y, Ho, Er, Tm and Lu are confirmed to form REB_{15.5}CN-type compounds. Single-crystal structure analysis yielded trigonal symmetry for ScB_{15.5}CN (space group P3̅m1 (No.164) with a = 0.5568(2) and c = 1.0756(2) nm), and the deduced atomic coordinates are summarized in table IVa.

REB_{22}C_{2}N was synthesized for Y, Ho, Er, Tm and Lu. The crystal structure, solved for a representative compound YB_{22}C_{2}N, belongs to the trigonal with space group R3̅m (No.166); it has six formula units in the unit cell and lattice constants a = b = 0.5623(0) nm and c = 4.4785(3) nm. Atomic coordinates of YB_{22}C_{2}N are summarized in table IVb.

Y, Ho, Er, Tm and Lu also form REB_{28.5}C_{4} which has a trigonal crystal structure with space group R3̅m (No. 166). Lattice constants of the representative compound YB_{28.5}C_{4} are a = b = 0.56457(9) nm and c = 5.68873(13) nm and there are six formula units in the unit cell. Structure data of YB_{28.5}C_{4} are summarized in table IVc.

== RE_{x}B_{12}C_{0.33}Si_{3.0} ==
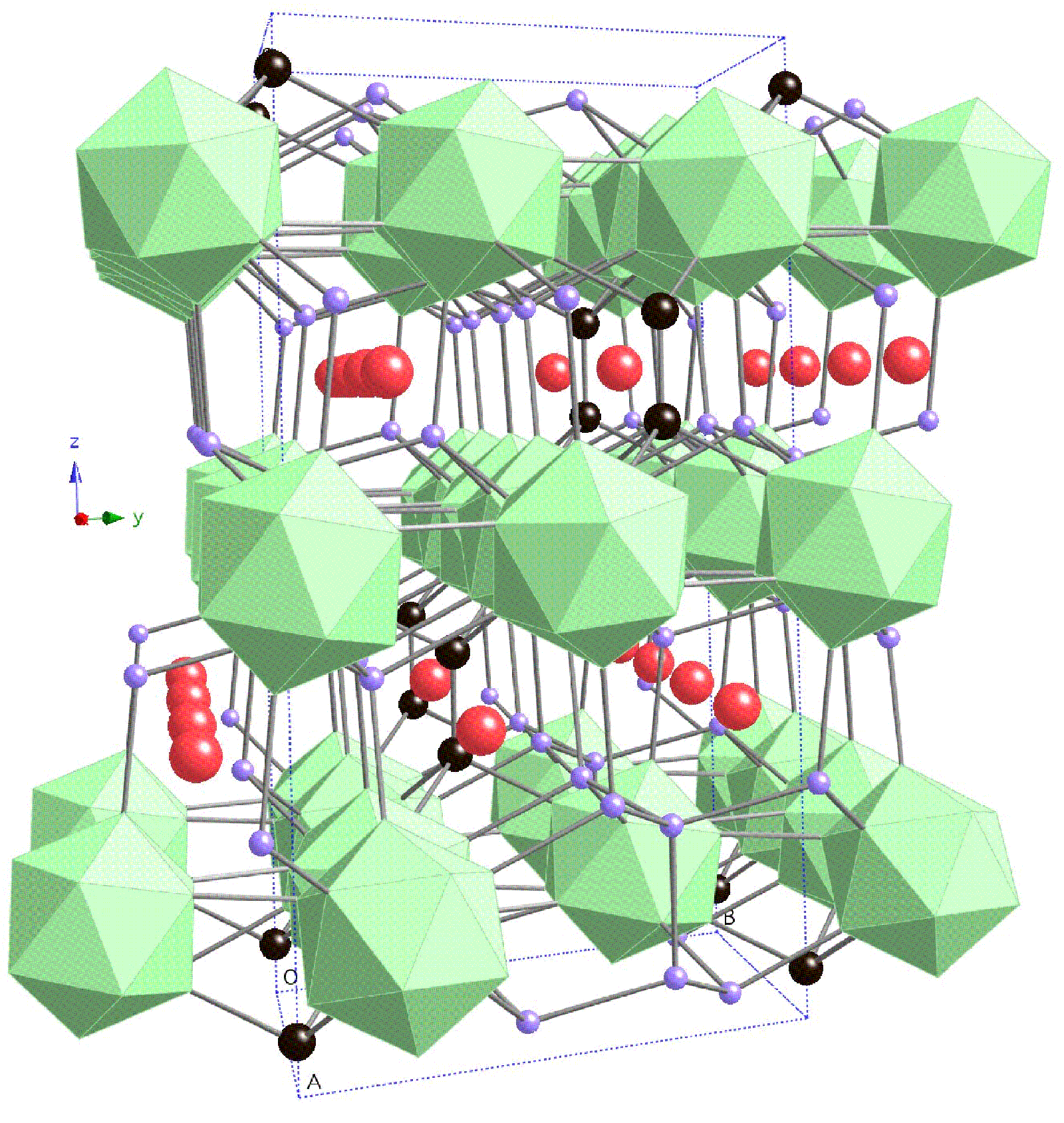
Fig. 14. Crystal structure of RE_{x}B_{12}C_{0.33}Si_{3.0} (RE=Y or Dy) viewed along the direction close to [100]. Red, black and blue spheres correspond to Y/Dy, C and Si atoms, respectively. Vacancies at the Y/Dy site are ignored.

Initially these were described as ternary RE-B-Si compounds, but later carbon was included to improve the structure description that resulted in a quaternary RE-B-C-Si composition. RE_{x}B_{12}C_{0.33}Si_{3.0} (RE=Y and Gd–Lu) have a unique crystal structure with two units – a cluster of B_{12} icosahedra and a Si_{8} ethane-like complex – and one bonding configuration (B_{12})_{3}≡Si-C≡(B_{12})_{3}. A representative compound of this group is Y_{x}B_{12}C_{0.33}Si_{3.0} (x=0.68). It has a trigonal crystal structure with space group R3̅m (No. 166) and lattice constants a = b = 1.00841(4) nm, c = 1.64714(5) nm, α = β = 90° and γ = 120°.

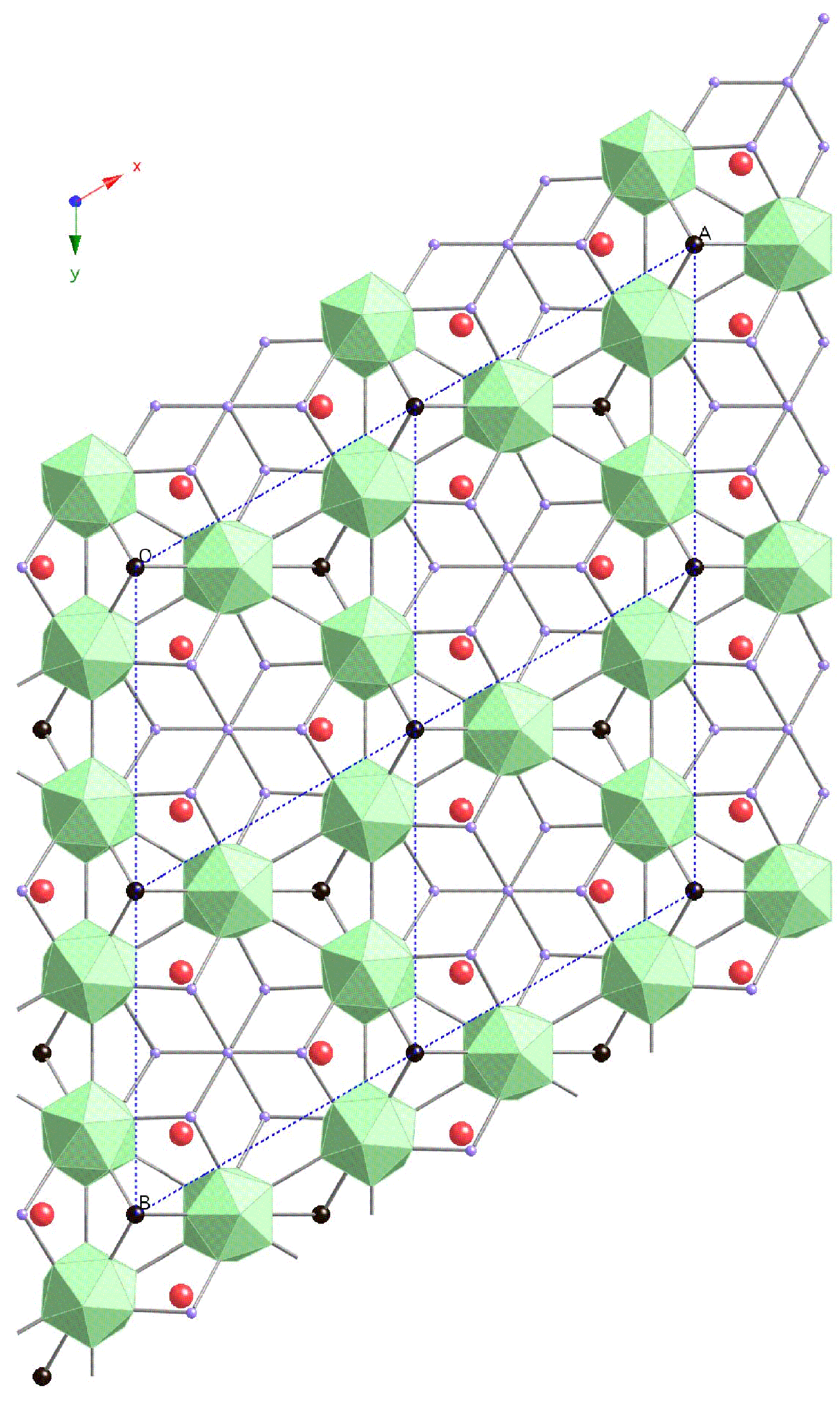
Fig. 15. A network of boron icosahedra lying in the (001) plane. Black, blue and red spheres correspond to C, Si and Y atoms, respectively.

The crystal has layered structure. Figure 15 shows a network of boron icosahedra that spreads parallel to the (001) plane, connecting with four neighbors through B1–B1 bonds. The C3 and Si3 site atoms strengthen the network by bridging the boron icosahedra. Contrary to other boron-rich icosahedral compounds, the boron icosahedra from different layers are not directly bonded. The icosahedra within one layer are linked through Si_{8} ethane-like clusters with (B_{12})_{3}≡Si-C≡(B_{12})_{3} bonds, as shown in figures 16a and b.

There are eight atomic sites in the unit cell: one yttrium Y, four boron B1–B4, one carbon C3 and three silicon sites Si1–Si3. Atomic coordinates, site occupancy and isotropic displacement factors are listed in table Va; 68% of the Y sites are randomly occupied and remaining Y sites are vacant. All boron sites and Si1 and Si2 sites are fully occupied. The C3 and Si3 sites can be occupied by either carbon or silicon atoms (mixed occupancy) with a probability of about 50%. Their separation is only 0.413 Å, and thus either the C3 or Si3 sites, but not both, are occupied. These sites form Si-C pairs, but not Si-Si or C-C pairs. The distances between the C3 and Si3 sites and the surrounding sites for Y_{x}B_{12}C_{0.33}Si_{3.0} are summarized in table Vb and the overall crystal structure is shown in figure 14.

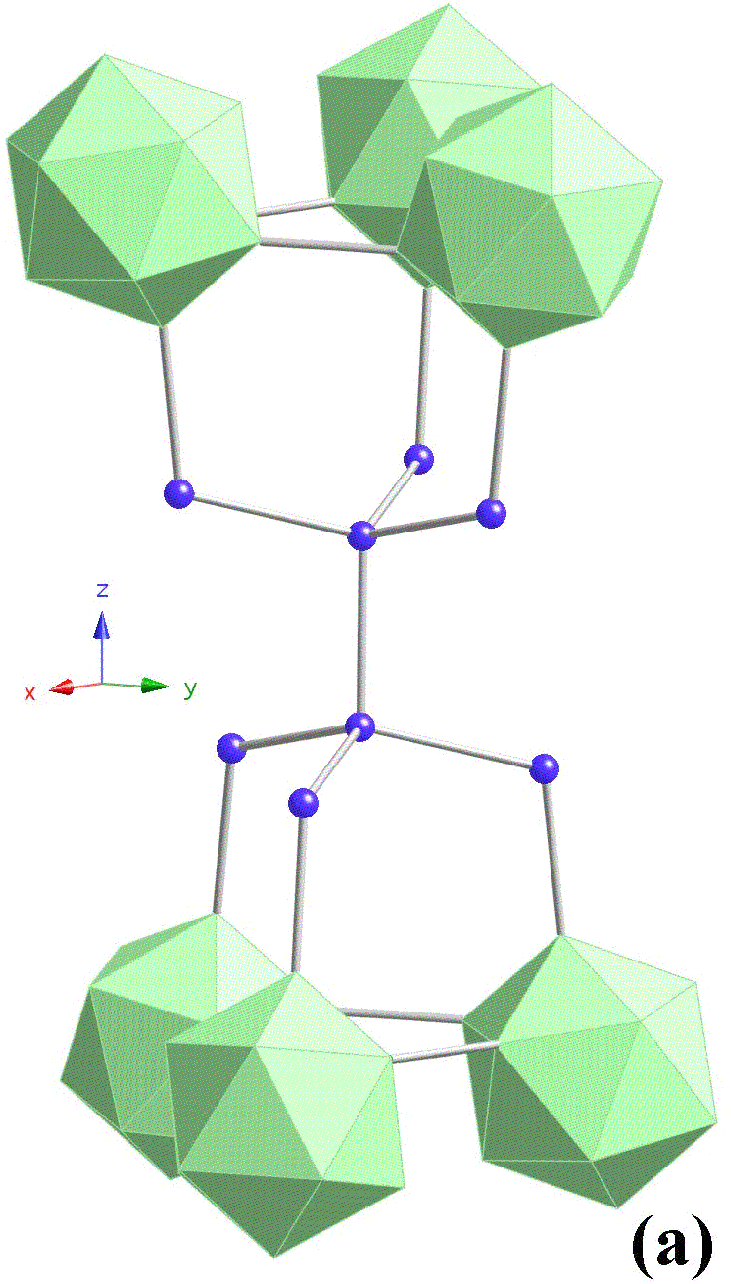
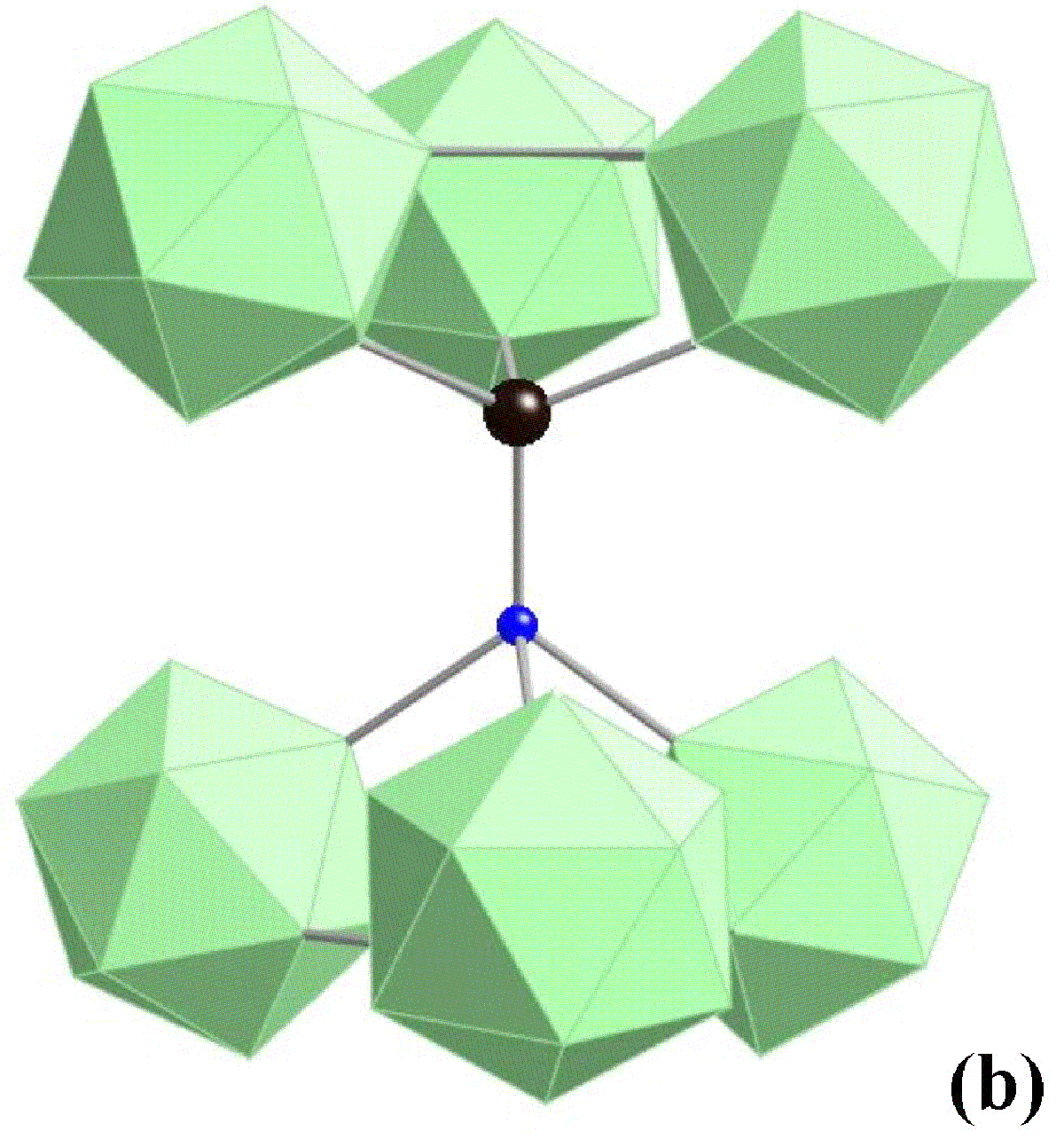
Fig. 16. (a) Si_{8} ethane-like cluster connects layers of boron icosahedra; a layer of boron icosahedra that lies at the same level as the Si_{8} cluster is not shown. (b) bonding configuration (B_{12})_{3}≡Si-C≡(B_{12})_{3}.

Salvador et al. reported an isotypic terbium compound Tb_{3–x}C_{2}Si_{8}(B_{12})_{3}. Most parts of the crystal structure are the same as those described above; however, its bonding configuration is deduced as (B_{12})_{3}≡C-C≡(B_{12})_{3} instead of (B_{12})_{3}≡Si-C≡(B_{12})_{3}. The authors intentionally added carbon to grow single crystals whereas the previous crystals were accidentally contaminated by carbon during their growth. Thus, higher carbon concentration was achieved. Existence of both bonding schemes of (B_{12})_{3}≡Si-C≡(B_{12})_{3} and (B_{12})_{3}≡C-C≡(B_{12})_{3} suggests the occupancy of the carbon sites of 50–100%. On the other hand, (B_{12})_{3}≡Si-Si≡(B_{12})_{3} bonding scheme is unlikely because of too short Si-Si distance, suggesting that the minimum carbon occupancy at the site is 50%. Some B atoms may replace C atoms at the C3 site, as previously assigned to the B site. However, the carbon occupation is more likely because the site is tetrahedrally coordinated whereas the B occupation of the site needs an extra electron to complete tetrahedral bonding. Thus, carbon is indispensable for this group of compounds.

== Scandium compounds ==
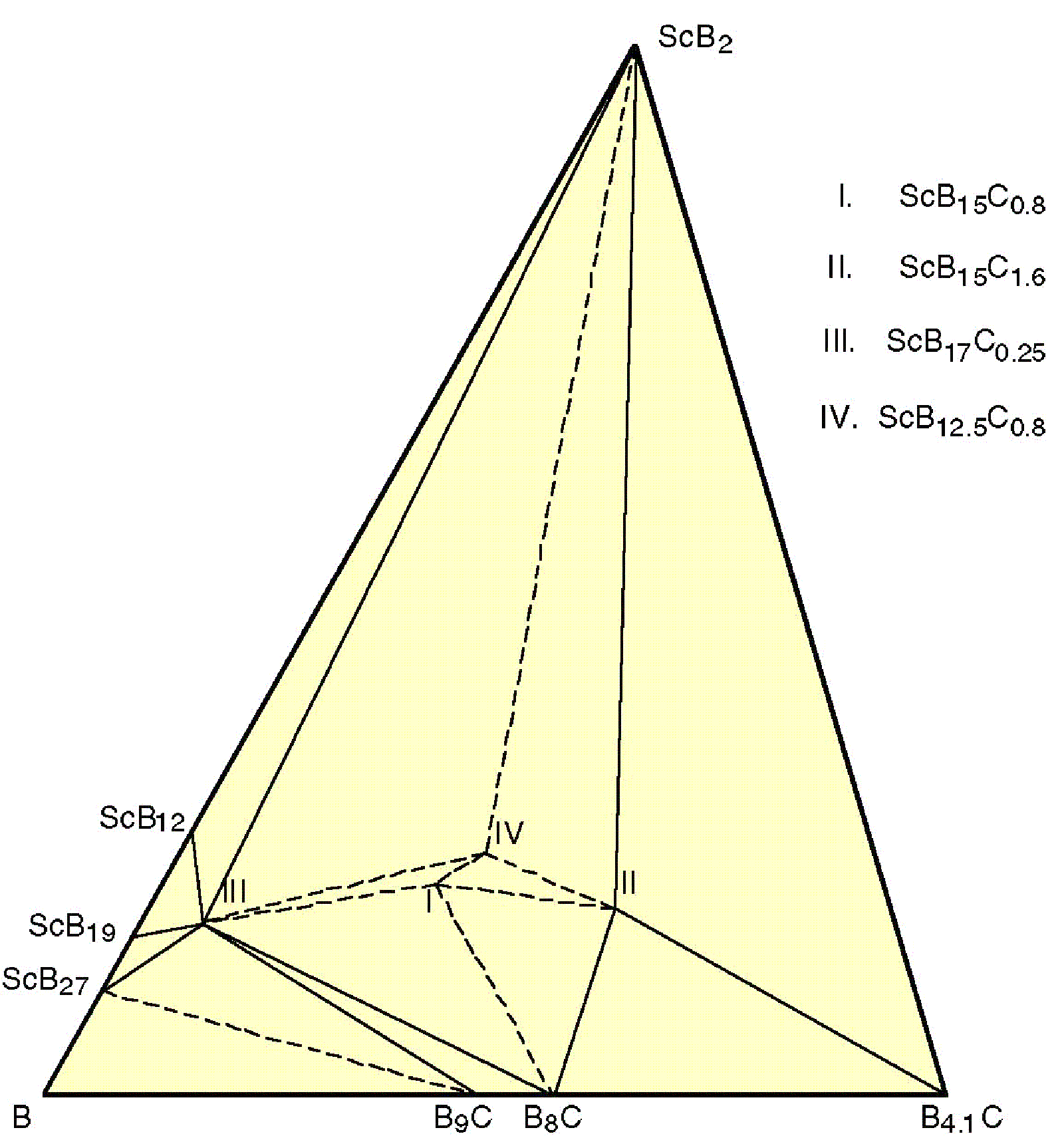
Fig. 17. The boron-rich corner of the Sc-B-C phase diagram.

Scandium has the smallest atomic and ionic (3+) radii (1.62 and 0.885 Å, respectively) among the rare-earth elements. It forms several icosahedron-based borides which are not found for other rare-earth elements; however, most of them are ternary Sc-B-C compounds. There are many boron-rich phases in the boron-rich corner of Sc-B-C phase diagram, as shown in figure 17. A slight variation of the composition can produce ScB_{19}, ScB_{17}C_{0.25}, ScB_{15}C_{0.8} and ScB_{15}C_{1.6}; their crystal structures are unusual for borides and are very different from each other.

=== ScB_{19+x}Si_{y} ===
ScB_{19+x}Si_{y} has a tetragonal crystal structure with space group P4_{1}2_{1}2 (No. 92) or P4_{3}2_{1}2 and lattice constants of a, b = 1.03081(2) and c = 1.42589(3) nm; it is isotypic to the α-AlB_{12} structure type. There are 28 atomic sites in the unit cell, which are assigned to 3 scandium atoms, 24 boron atoms and one silicon atom. Atomic coordinates, site occupancies and isotropic displacement factors are listed in table VI.

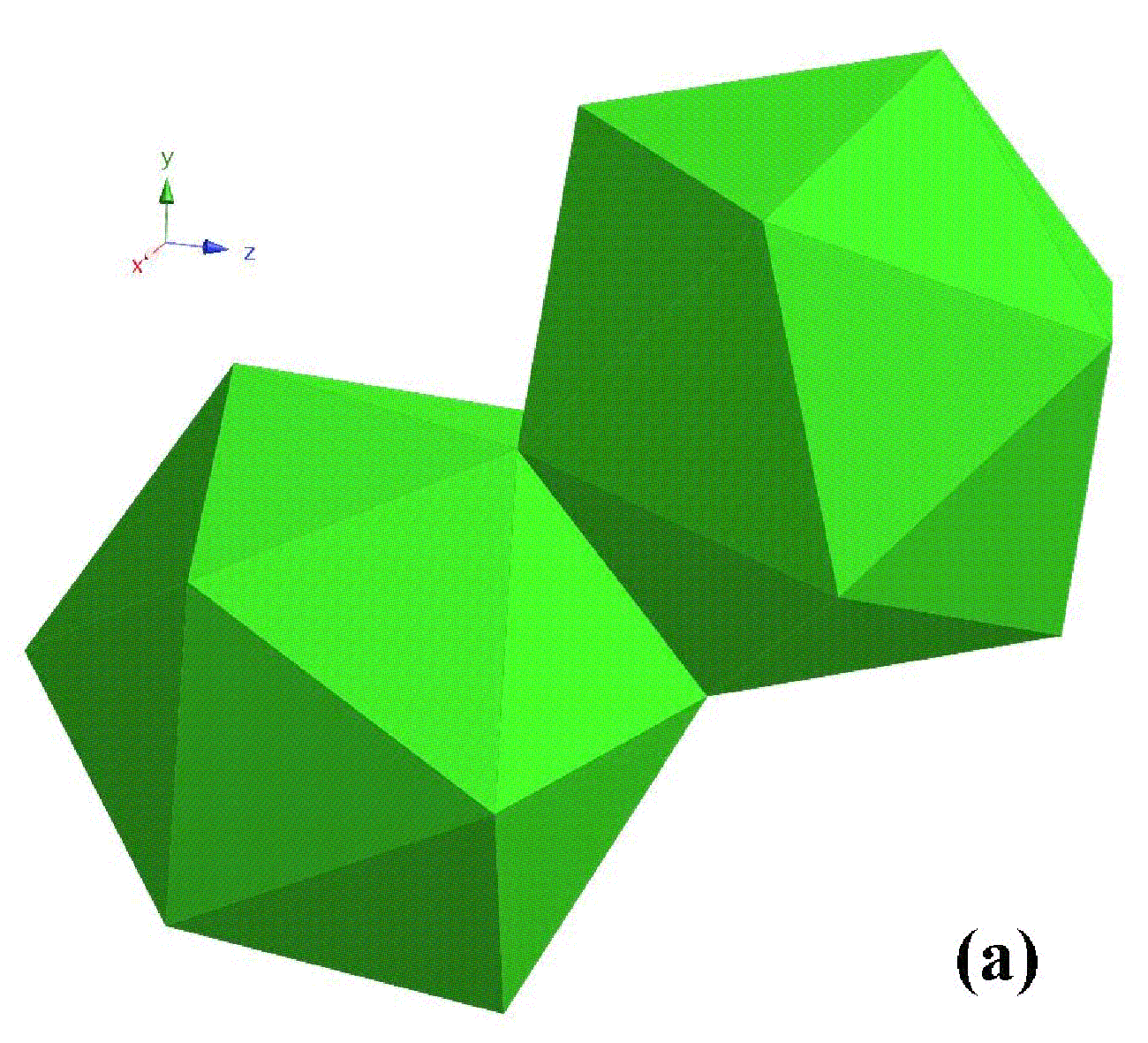
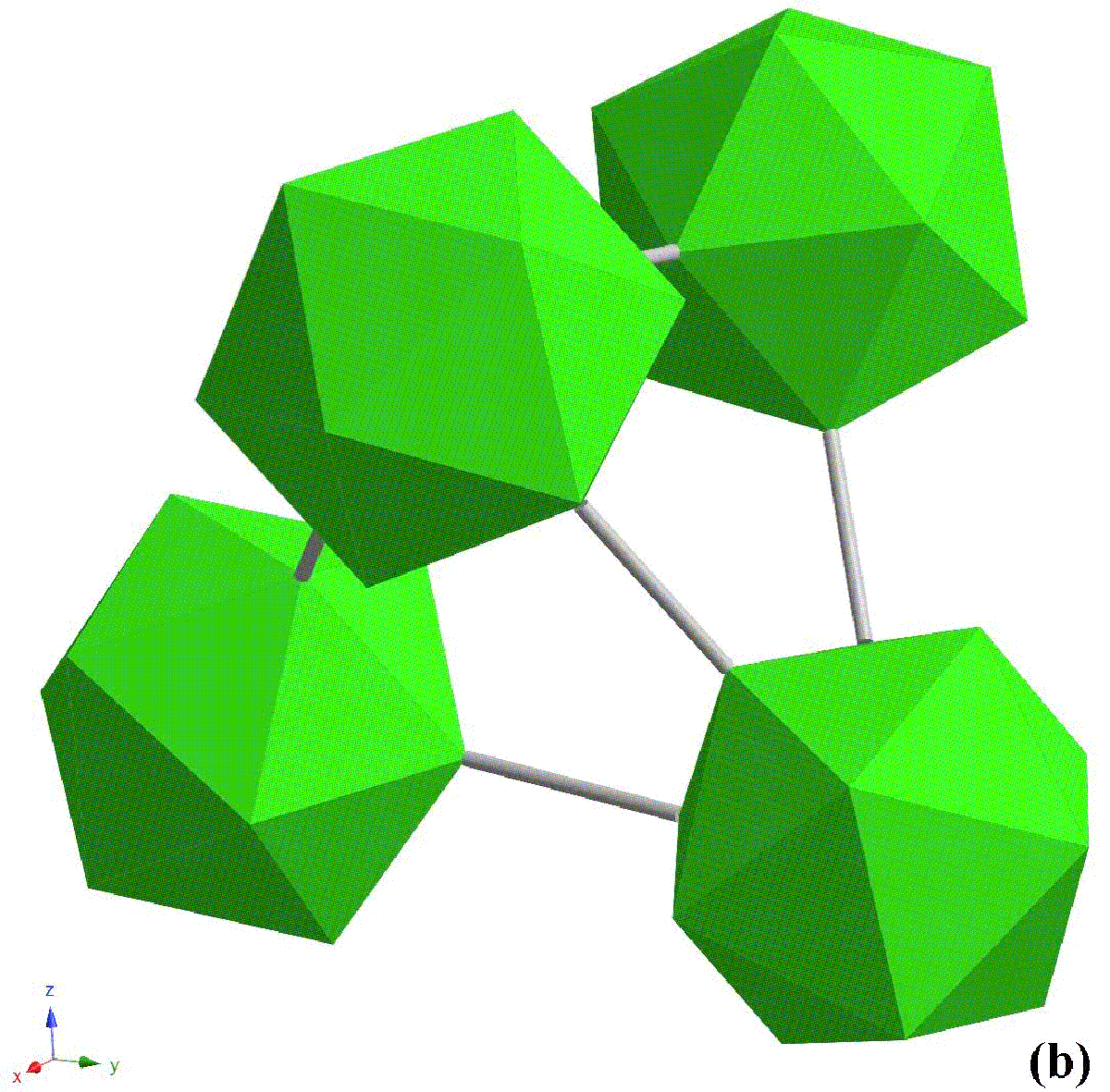
Fig. 18. (a) Twinned B_{22} icosahedra, (b) boron supertetrahedron constructed by 4 icosahedra.

The boron framework of ScB_{19+x}Si_{y} is based on one B_{12} icosahedron and one B_{22} unit. This unit can be observed in β-tetragonal boron and is a modification of the B_{20} unit of α-AlB_{12} (or B_{19} unit in early reports). The B_{20} unit is a twinned icosahedron made from B13 to B22 sites with two vacant sites and one B atom (B23) bridging both sides of the unit. The twinned icosahedron is shown in figure 18a. B23 was treated as an isolated atom in the early reports; it is bonded to each twinned icosahedra through B18 and to another icosahedron through B5 site. If the twinned icosahedra were independent without twinning then B23 would be a bridge site linking three icosahedra. However, because of twinning, B23 shifts closer to the twinned icosahedra than another icosahedron; thus B23 is currently treated as a member of the twinned icosahedra. In ScB_{19+x}Si_{y}, the two B24 sites which correspond to the vacant sites in the B_{20} unit are partially occupied; thus, the unit should be referred to as a B_{22} cluster which is occupied by about 20.6 boron atoms. Scandium atoms occupy 3 of 5 Al sites of α-AlB_{12}, that is Sc1, Sc2 and Sc3 correspond to Al4, Al1 and Al2 sites of α-AlB_{12}, respectively. The Al3 and Al5 sites are empty for ScB_{19+x}Si_{y}, and the Si site links two B_{22} units. This phase also exists without silicon.

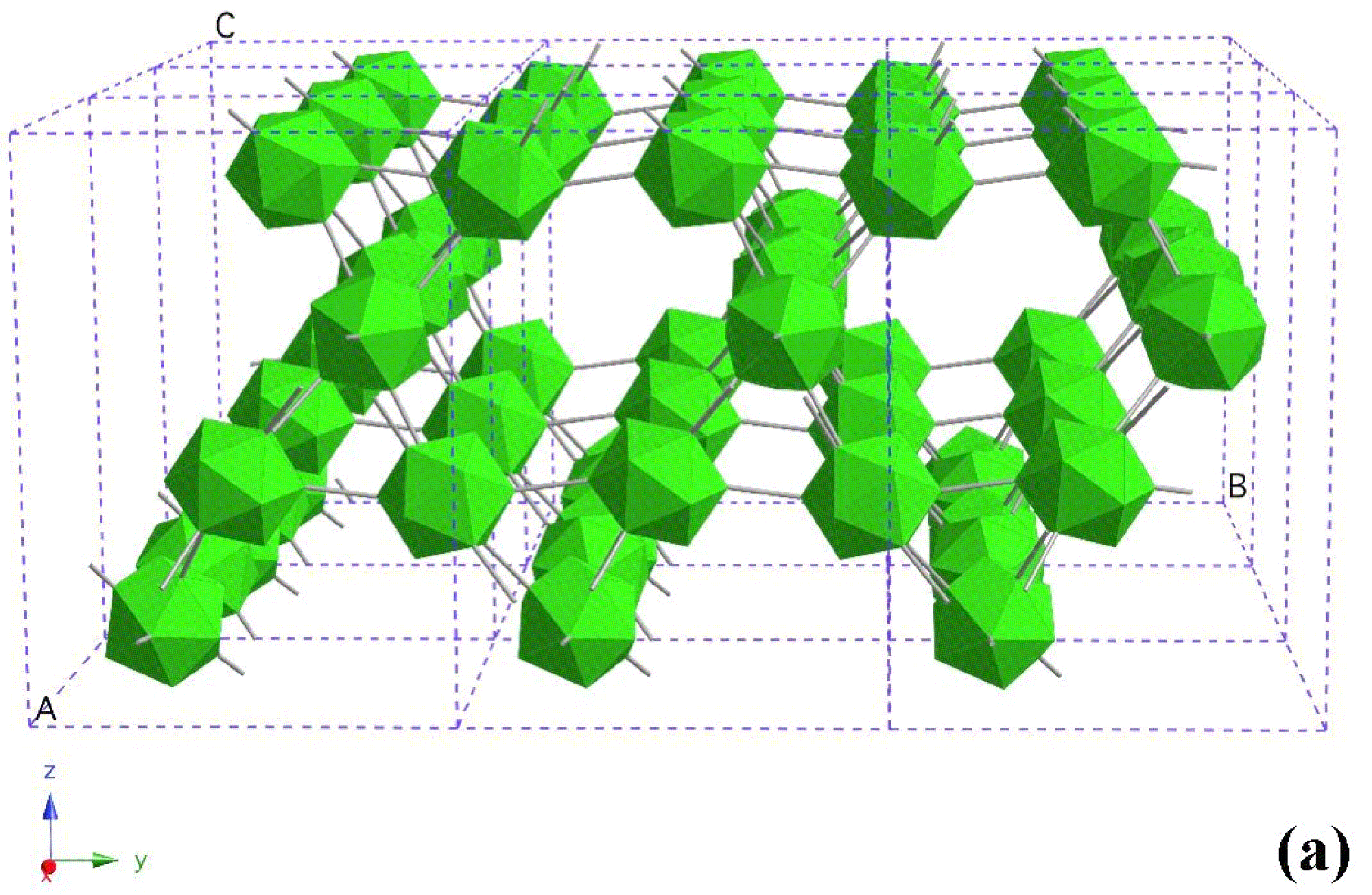
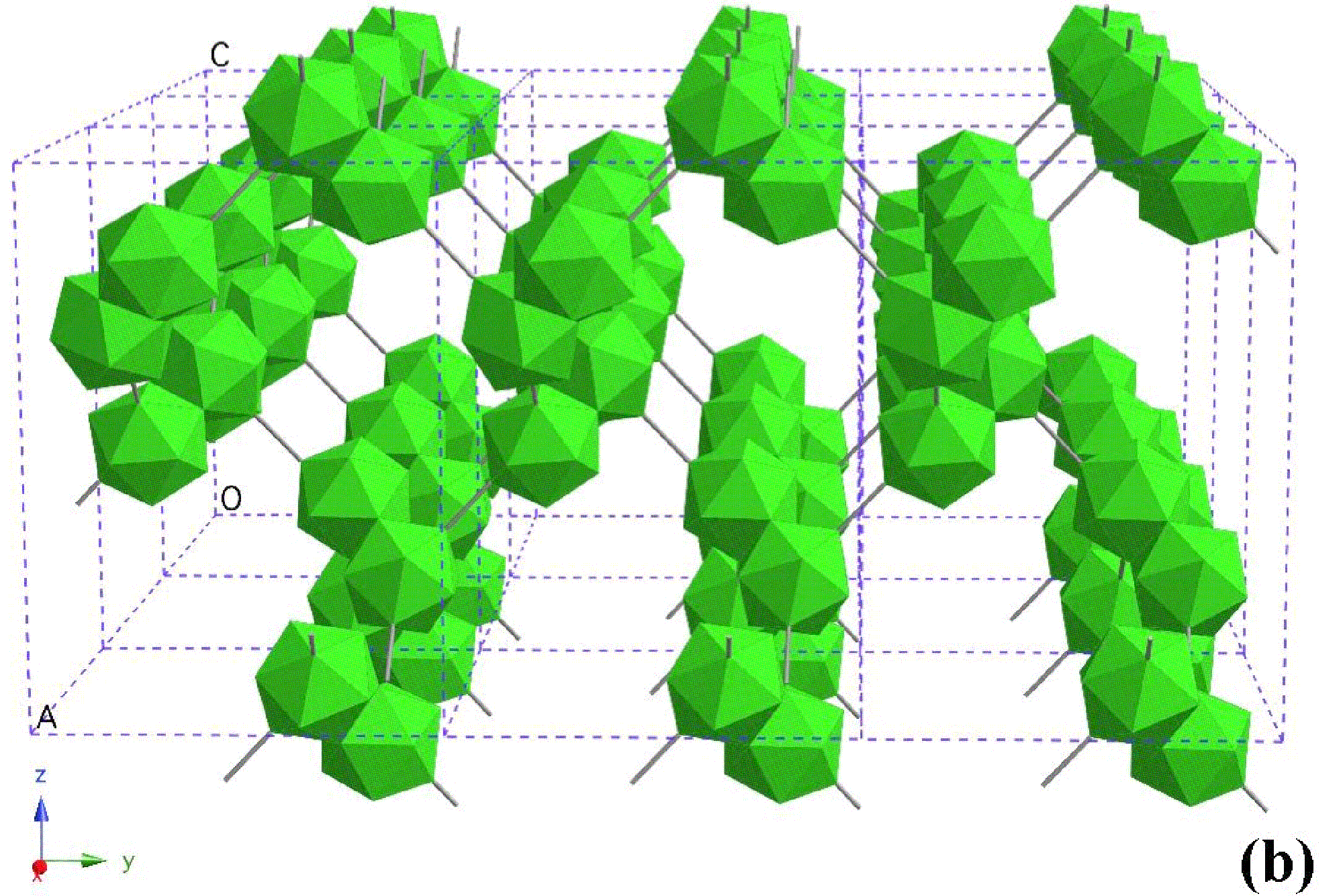
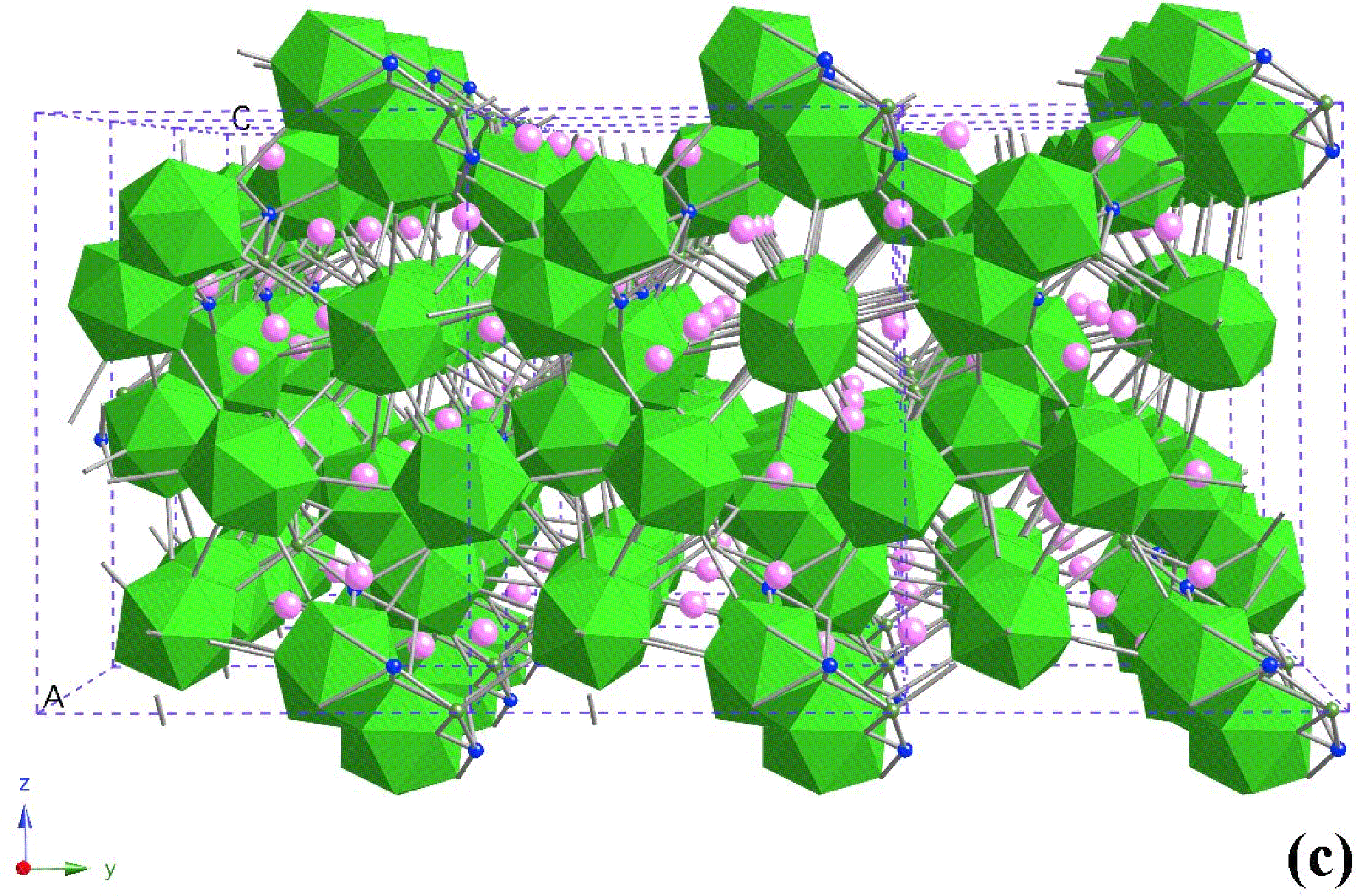
Fig. 19. (a) Network of boron icosahedra, (b) B_{22} unit network and (c) overall crystal structure of ScB_{19+x}Si_{y}; pink and blue spheres indicate Sc and Si atoms, respectively.

Figure 19a shows the network of boron icosahedra in the boron framework of ScB_{19+x}Si_{y}. In this network, 4 icosahedra form a supertetrahedron (figure 18b); its one edge is parallel to the a-axis, and the icosahedra on this edge make up a chain along the a-axis. The opposite edge of the supertetrahedron is parallel to the b-axis and the icosahedra on this edge form a chain along the b-axis. As shown in figure 19, there are wide tunnels surrounded by the icosahedron arrangement along the a- and b-axes. The tunnels are filled by the B_{22} units which strongly bond to the surrounding icosahedra; the connection of the B_{22} units is helical and it runs along the c-axis as shown in figure 19b. Scandium atoms occupy the voids in the boron network as shown in figure 19c, and the Si atoms bridge the B_{22} units.

=== ScB_{17}C_{0.25} ===
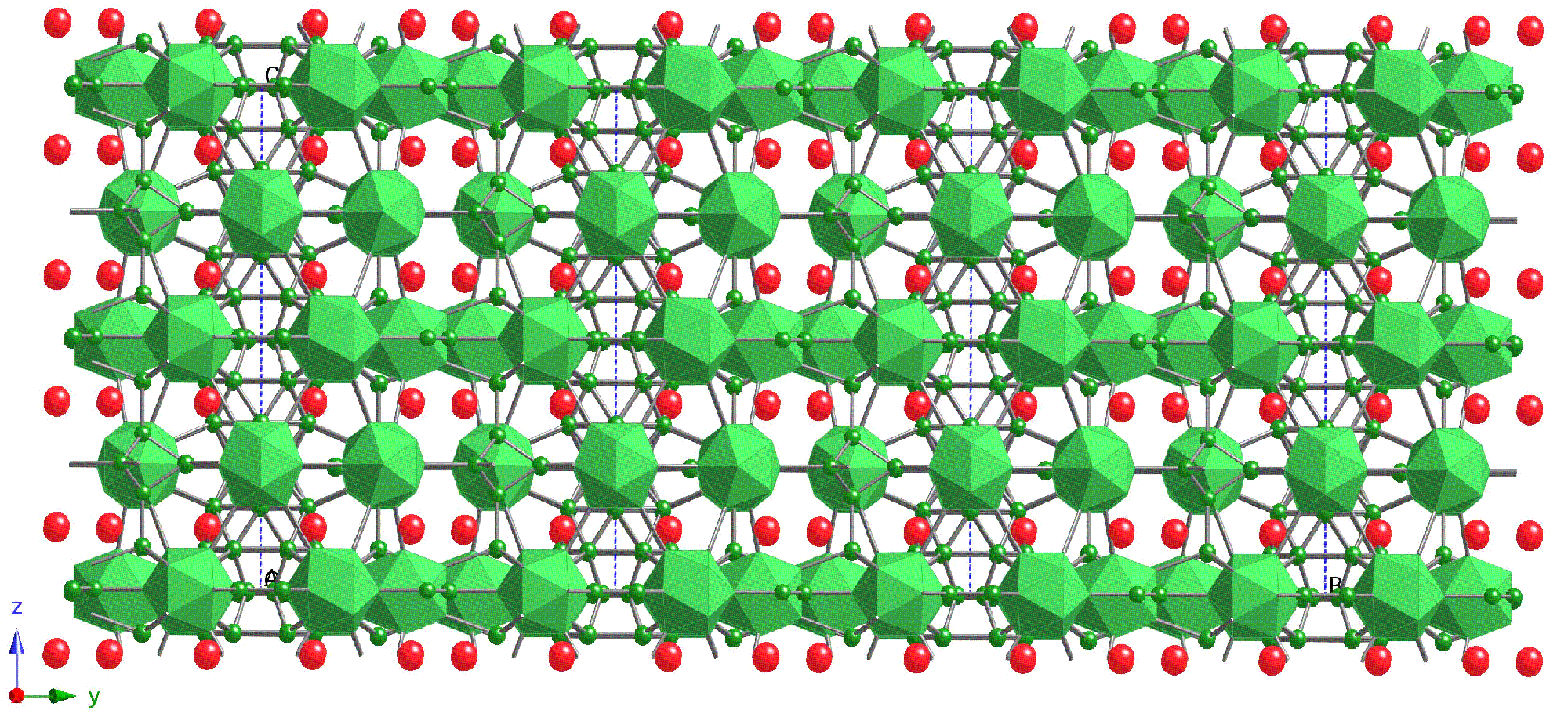
Fig. 20. ScB_{17}C_{0.25} crystal structure viewed along the a-axis. The icosahedron layers alternatively stack along the c-axis in the order I1–I2–I1–I2–I1.

Very small amount of carbon is sufficient to stabilize "ScB_{17}C_{0.25}". This compound has a broad composition range, namely ScB_{16.5+x}C_{0.2+y} with x ≤ 2.2 and y ≤ 0.44. ScB_{17}C_{0.25} has a hexagonal crystal structure with space group P6mmm (No. 199) and lattice constants a, b = 1.45501(15) nm and c = 0.84543(16) nm.

There are 19 atomic sites in the unit cell, which are assigned to one scandium site Sc, 14 boron sites B1–B14 having 100% occupancy, two boron-carbon mixed-occupancy sites B/C15 and B/C16, and two partial-occupancy boron sites B17 and B18. Atomic coordinates, site occupancies and isotropic displacement factors are listed in table VII. Although a very small amount of carbon (less than 2 wt%!) plays an important role in the phase stability, carbon does not have its own sites but shares with boron two interstitial sites B/C15 and B/C16.

There are two inequivalent B_{12} icosahedra, I1 and I2, which are constructed by the B1–B5 and B8–B12 sites, respectively. A "tube" is another characteristic structure unit of ScB_{17}C_{0.25}. It extends along the c-axis and consists of B13, B14, B17 and B18 sites where B13 and B14 form 6-membered rings. B17 and B18 sites also form 6-membered rings; however, their mutual distances (0.985 Å for B17 and 0.955 Å for B18) are too short for a simultaneous occupation of the neighboring sites. Therefore, boron atoms occupy 2nd neighbor site forming a triangle. The occupancies of B17 and B18 sites should be 50%, but the structure analysis suggests larger values. The crystal structure viewed along the a-axis is shown in figure 20, which suggests that the ScB_{17}C_{0.25} is a layered material. Two layers, respectively constructed by the icosahedra I1 and I2, alternatively stack along the c-axis. However, the ScB_{17}C_{0.25} crystal is not layered. For example, during arc-melting, ScB_{17}C_{0.25} needle crystals violently grow along the c-axis – this never happens in layered compounds. The crystal structure viewed along the c-axis is shown in figure 21a. The icosahedra I1 and I2 form a ring centered by the "tube" shown in figure 21b, which probably governs the properties of the ScB_{17}C_{0.25} crystal. B/C15 and B/C16 mixed-occupancy sites interconnect the rings. A structural similarity can be seen between ScB_{17}C_{0.25} and BeB_{3}.

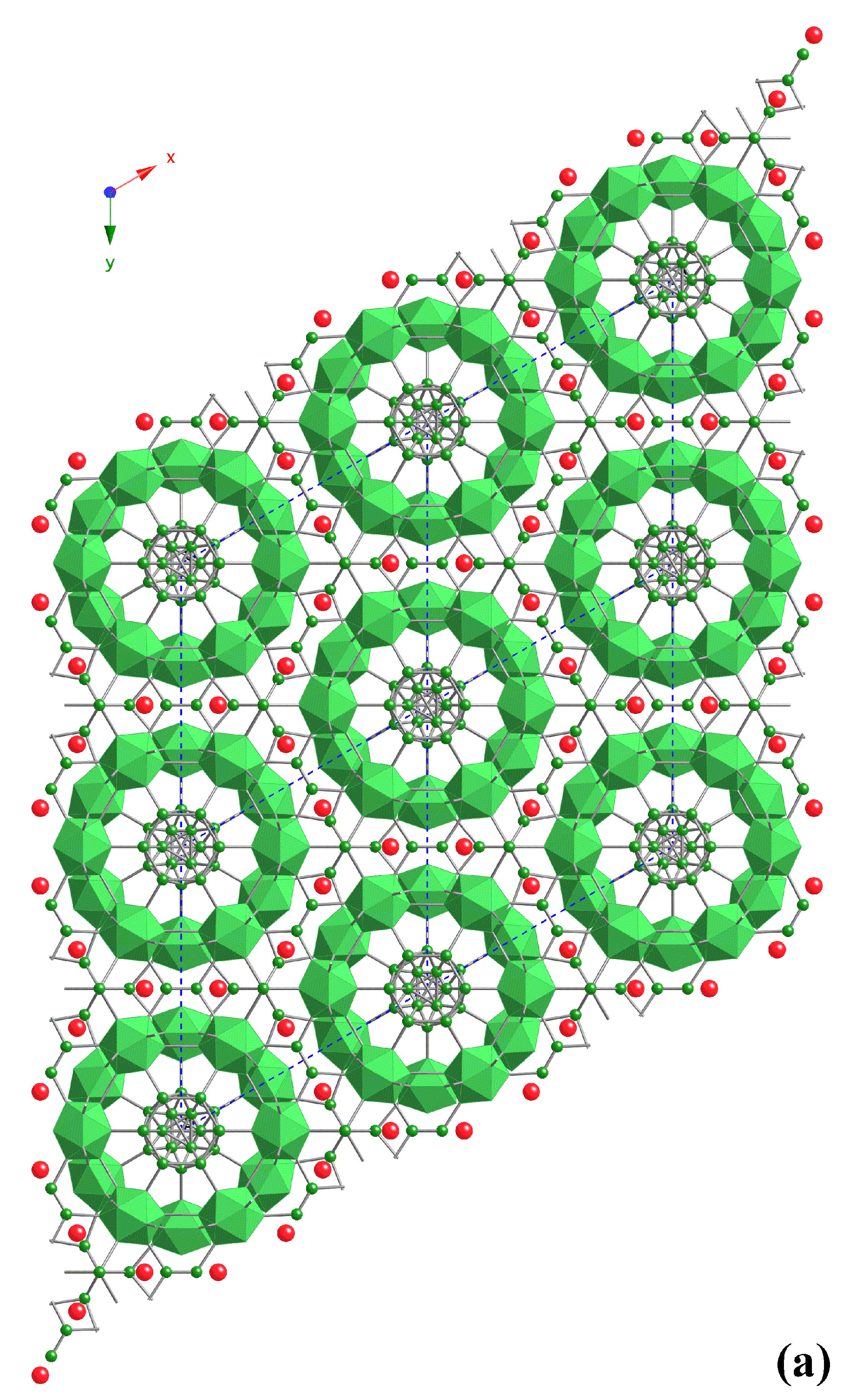
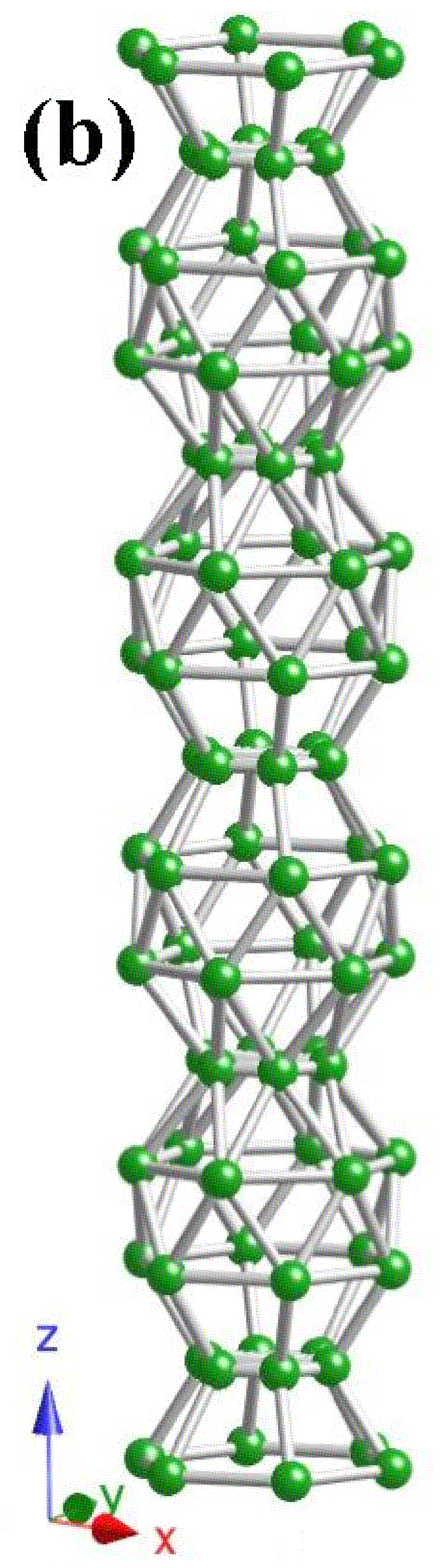
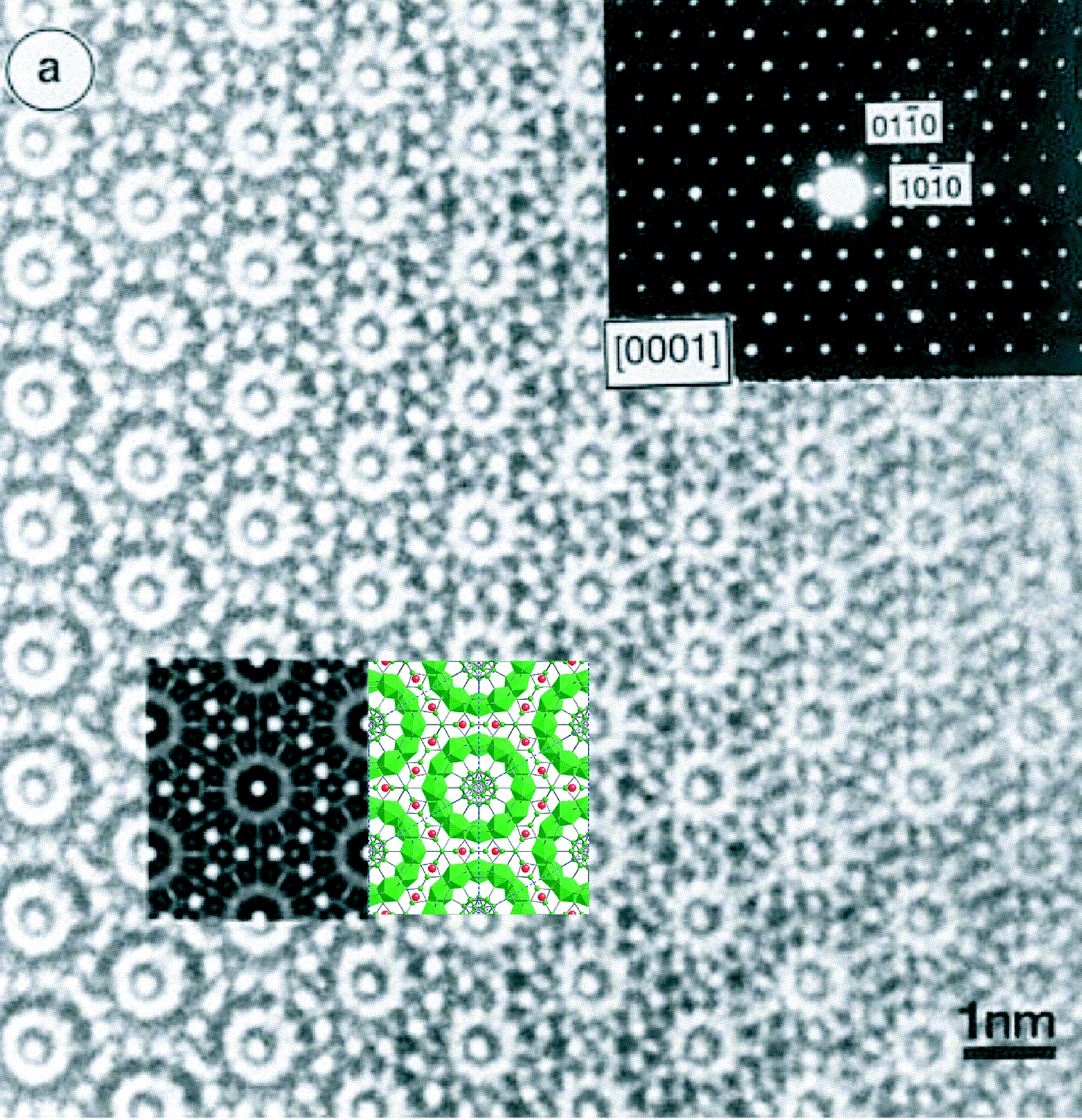
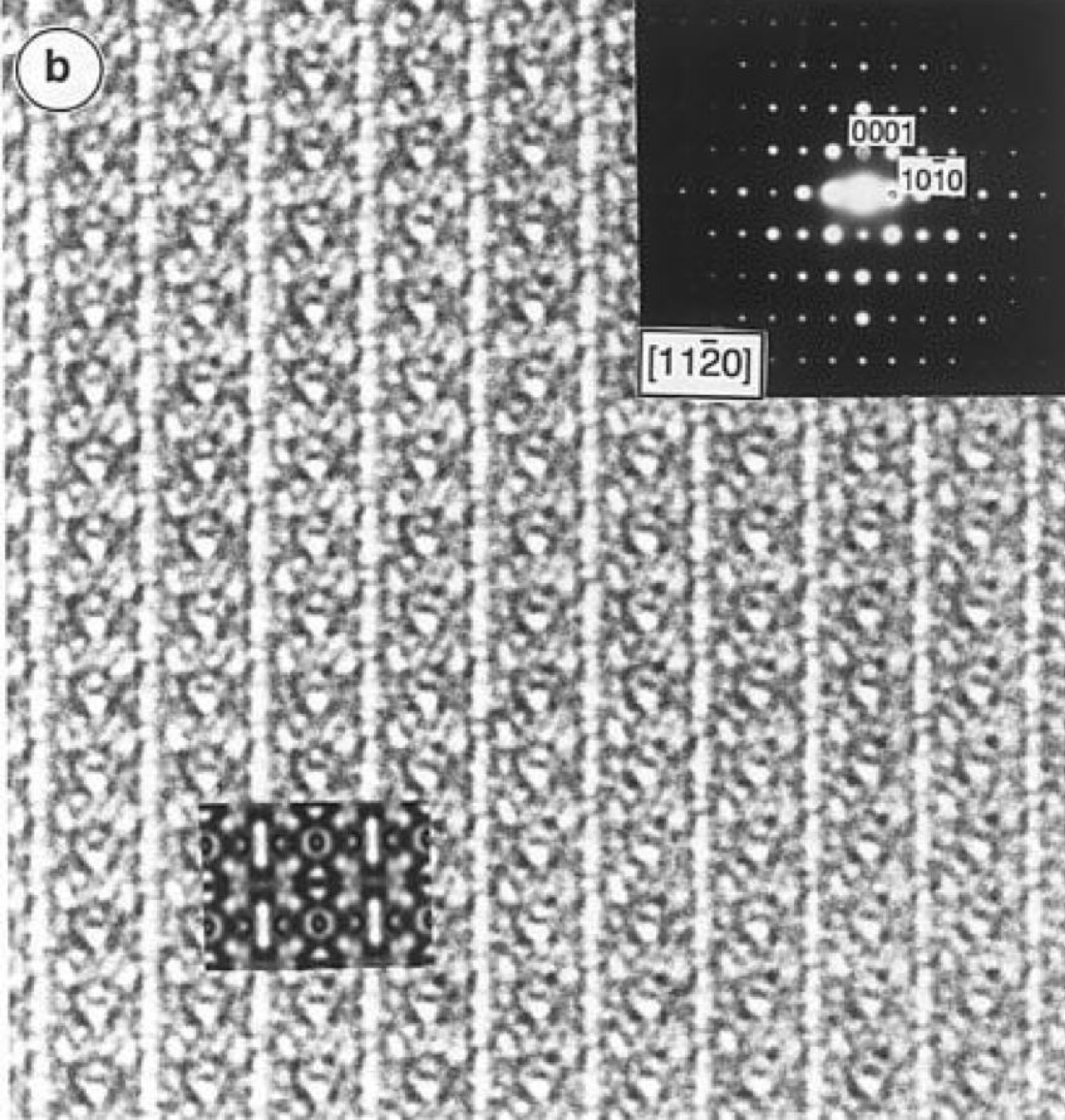
Fig. 21. (a) ScB_{17}C_{0.25} crystal structure viewed along the c-axis. Icosahedra I1 and I2 form a ring centered by a "tube". (b) The "tube" structure that runs along the c-axis. Partial occupancies of B17 and B18 are ignored. Fig. 22. Experimental HRTEM lattice images and electron diffraction patterns (top-right insets) taken along the (a) [0001] and (b) [112̅0] directions. Image simulations are added in the bottom-left insets, and a fragment of the crystal structure is also added to (a).

Figures 22a and b present HRTEM lattice images and electron diffraction patterns taken along the [0001] and [112̅0] crystalline directions, respectively. The HRTEM lattice image of figure 22a reproduces well the (a, b) plane of the crystal structure shown in figure 21a, with the clearly visible rings membered by icosahedra I1 and I2 and centered by the "tube". Figure 22b proves that ScB_{17}C_{0.25} does not have layered character but its c-axis direction is built up by the ring-like structure and tubular structures.

=== Sc_{0.83–x}B_{10.0–y}C_{0.17+y}Si_{0.083–z} ===
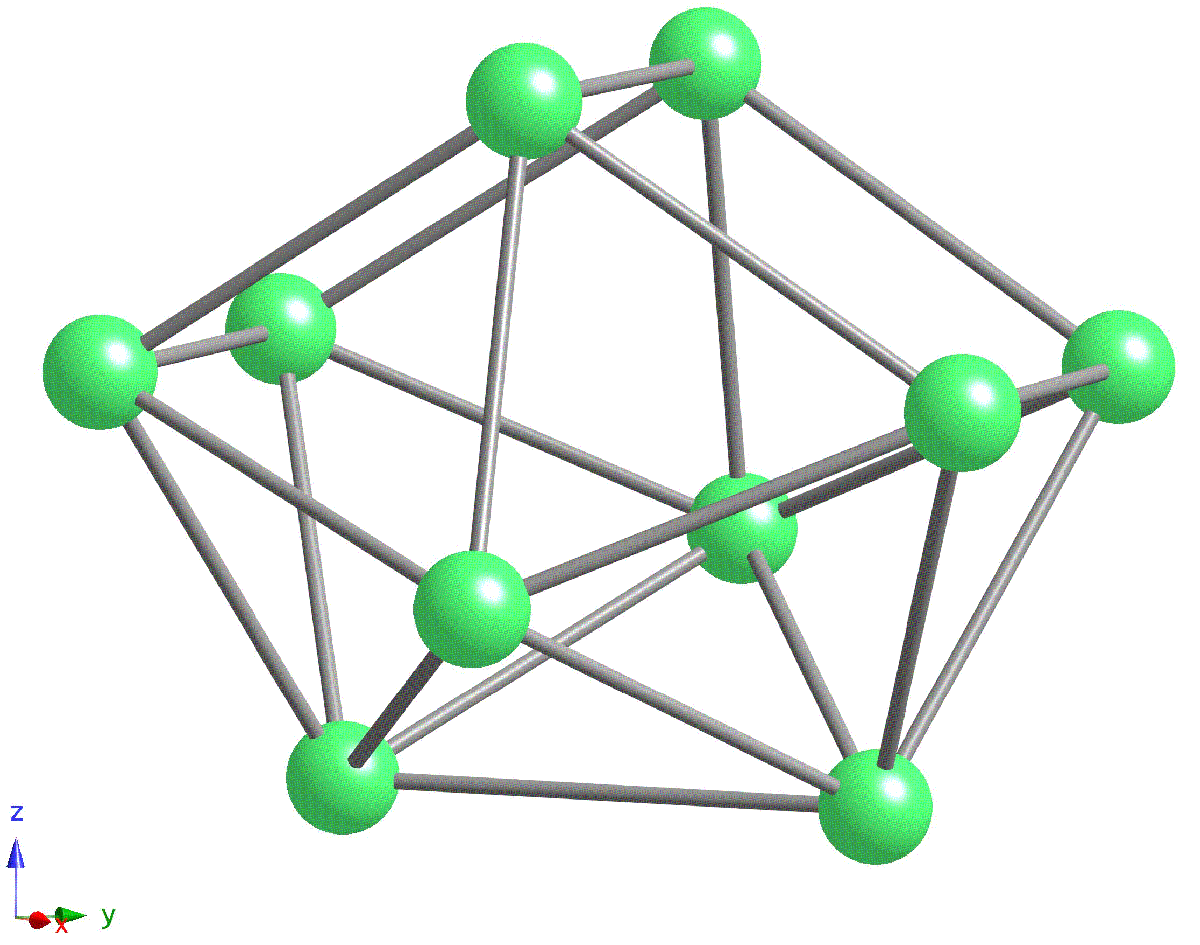
Fig. 23. B_{10} polyhedron in the Sc_{0.83–x}B_{10.0–y}C_{0.17+y}Si_{0.083–z} crystal structure.

Sc_{0.83–x}B_{10.0–y}C_{0.17+y}Si_{0.083–z} (x = 0.030, y = 0.36 and z = 0.026) has a cubic crystal structure with space group F4̅3m (No. 216) and lattice constant a = 2.03085(5) nm. This compound was initially identified as ScB_{15}C_{0.8} (phase I in the Sc-B-C phase diagram of figure 17). A small amount of Si was added into the floating zone crystal growth and thus this phase is a quaternary compound. Its rare cubic structure has 26 sites in the unit cell: three Sc sites, two Si sites, one C site and 20 B sites; 4 out of 20 B sites are boron-carbon mixed-occupancy sites. Atomic coordinates, site occupancies and isotropic displacement factors are listed in table VIII.

In the unit cell, there are three independent icosahedra, I1, I2 and I3, and a B_{10} polyhedron which are formed by the B1–B4, B5–B8, B9–B13 and B14–B17 sites, respectively. (Note: There are more than 4 sites in total among, say, B5–B8 sites, but many of them are equivalent by symmetry and thus do not have an individual label.) The B_{10} polyhedron has not been observed previously and it is shown in figure 23. The icosahedron I2 has a boron-carbon mixed-occupancy site B,C6 whose occupancy is B/C=0.58/0.42. Remaining 3 boron-carbon mixed-occupancy sites are bridge sites; C and Si sites are also bridge sites.

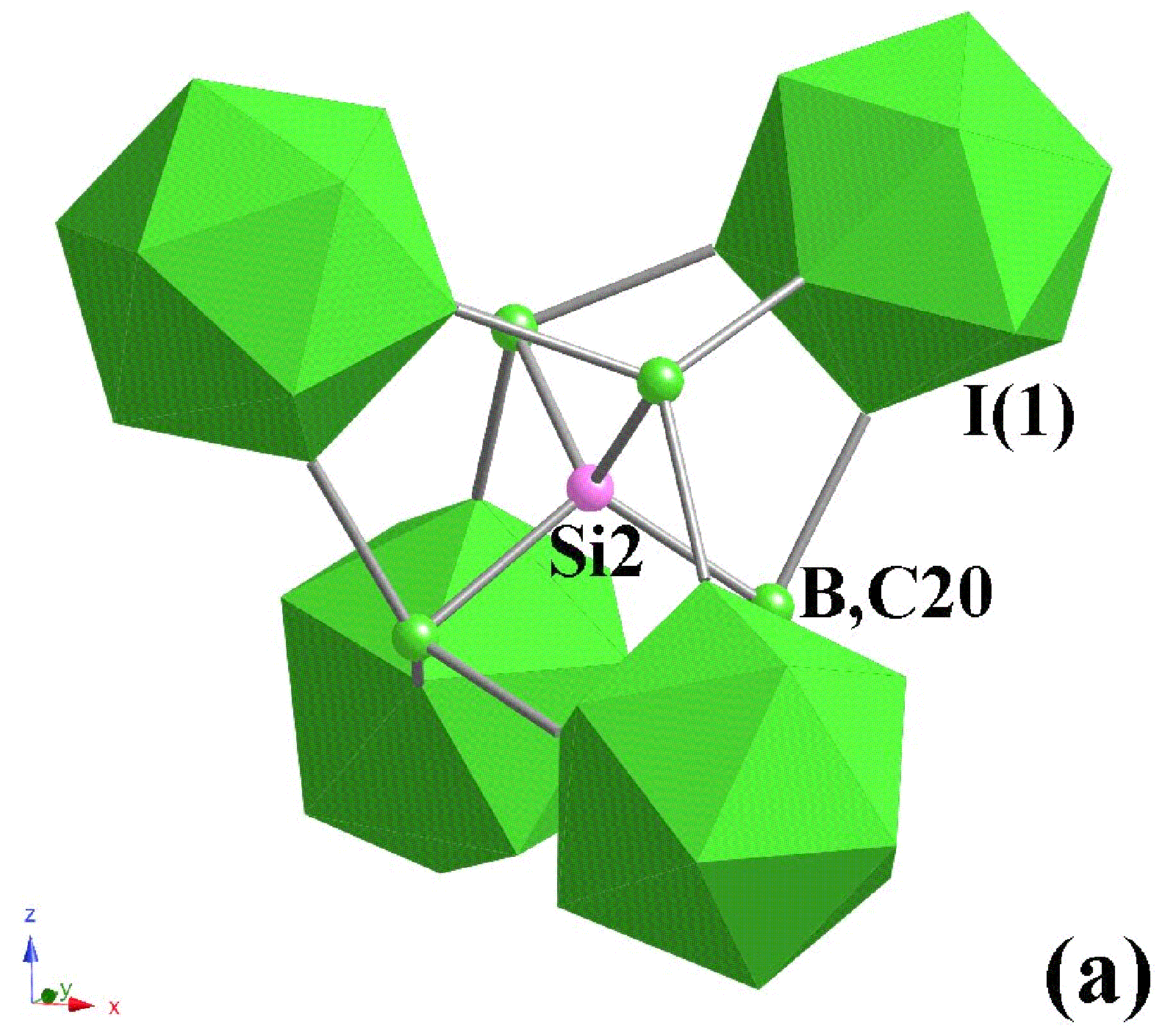
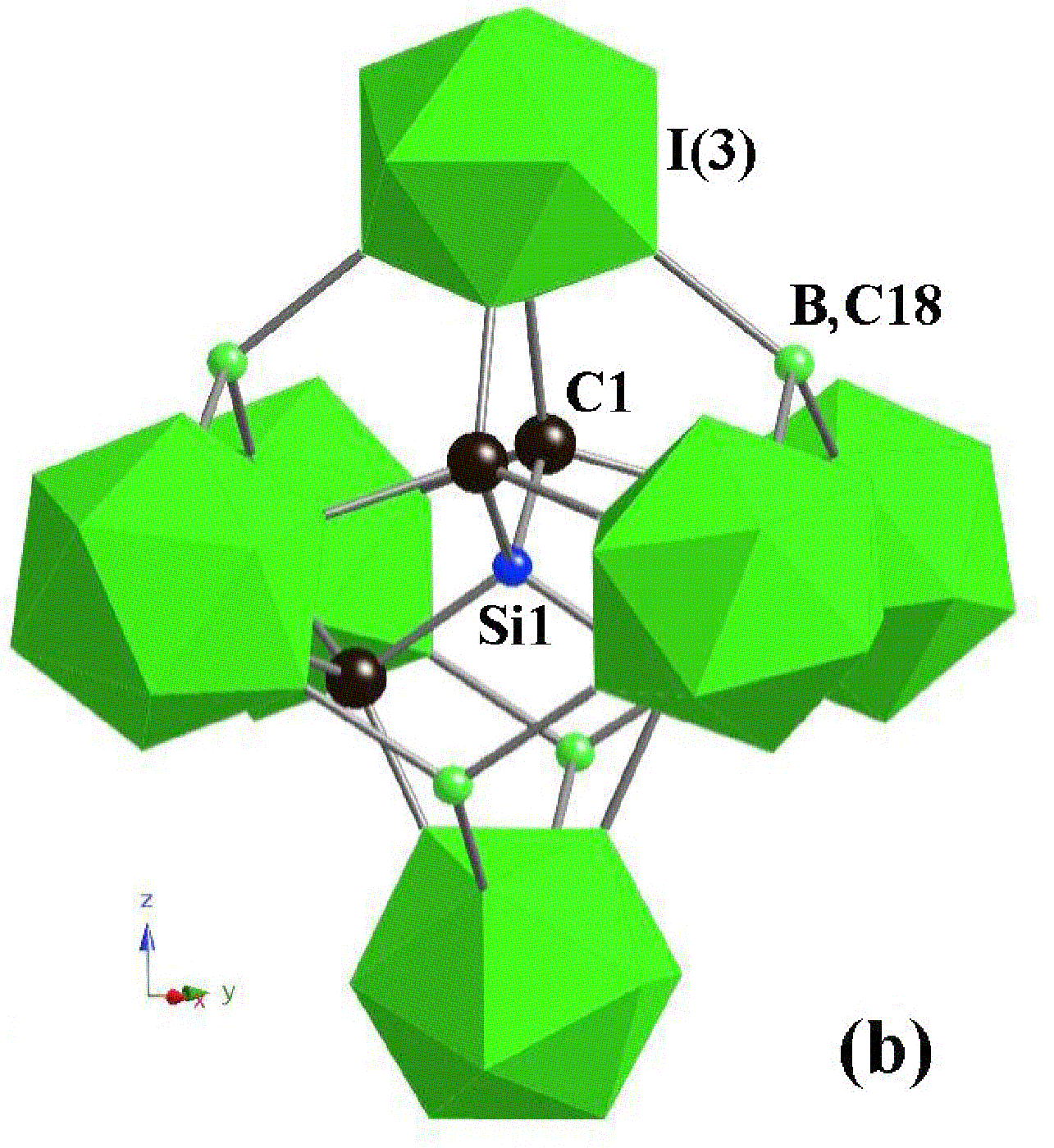
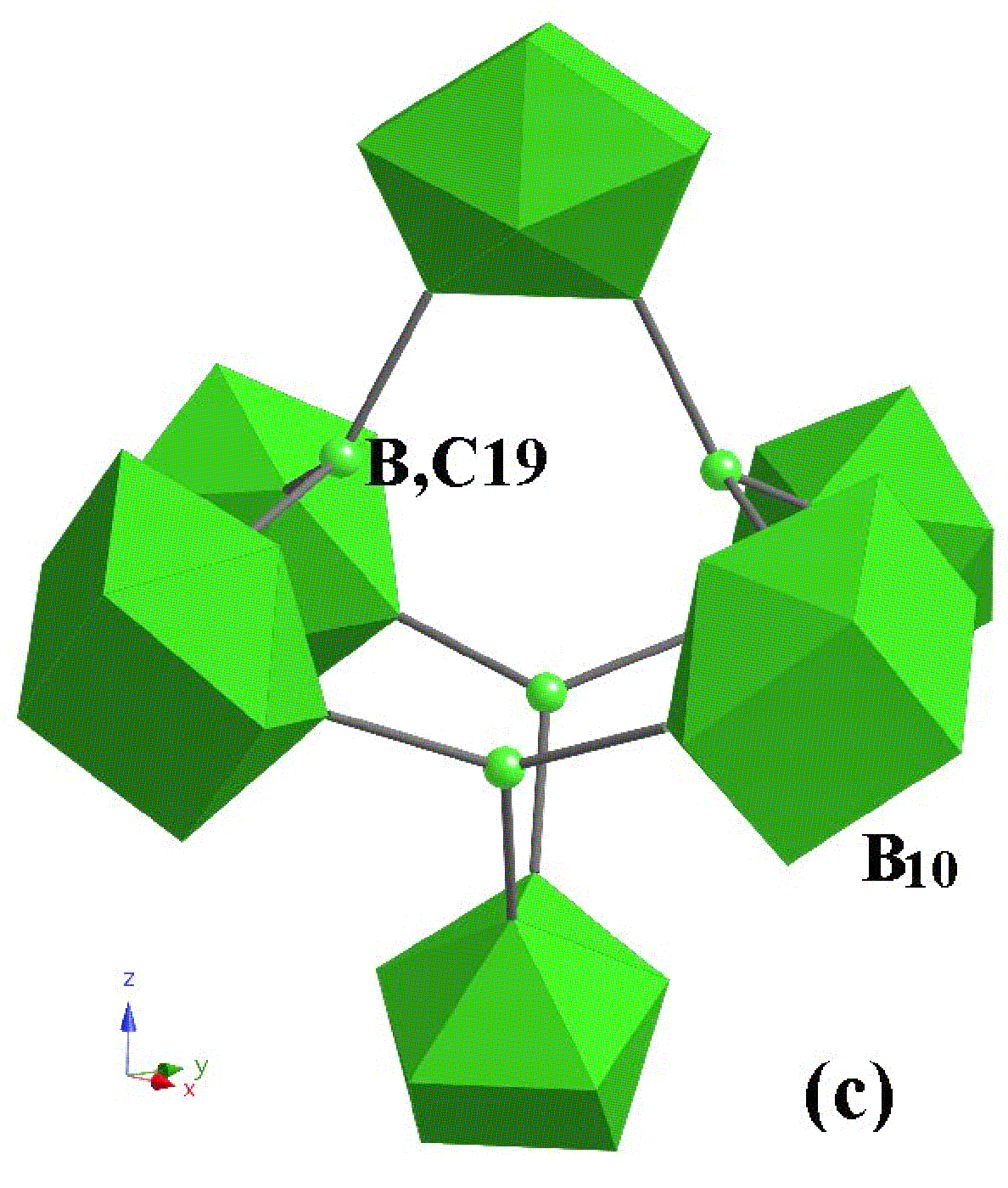
Fig. 24. (a) Supertetrahedron T(1), (b) superoctahedron O(1) and (c) octahedral arrangement of the B_{10} polyhedra in the Sc_{0.83–x}B_{10.0–y}C_{0.17+y}Si_{0.083–z} crystal structure.

More than 1000 atoms are available in the unit cell, which is built up by large structure units such as two supertetrahedra T(1) and T(2) and one superoctahedron O(1). As shown in figure 24a, T(1) consists of 4 icosahedra I(1) which have no direct bonding but are bridged by four B and C20 atoms. These atoms also form tetrahedron centered by the Si2 sites. The supertetrahedron T(2) that consists of 4 icosahedra I(2) is the same as shown in figure 18b; its mixed-occupancy sites B and C6 directly bond with each other. The superoctahedron O(1) consists of 6 icosahedra I(3) and bridge sites B, C18, C1 and Si1; here Si1 and C1 exhibit a tetrahedral arrangement at the center of O(1). The B_{10} polyhedra also arrange octahedrally, without the central atom, as shown in figure 24c where the B and C19 atoms bridge the B_{10} polyhedra to form the octahedral supercluster of the B_{10} polyhedra.

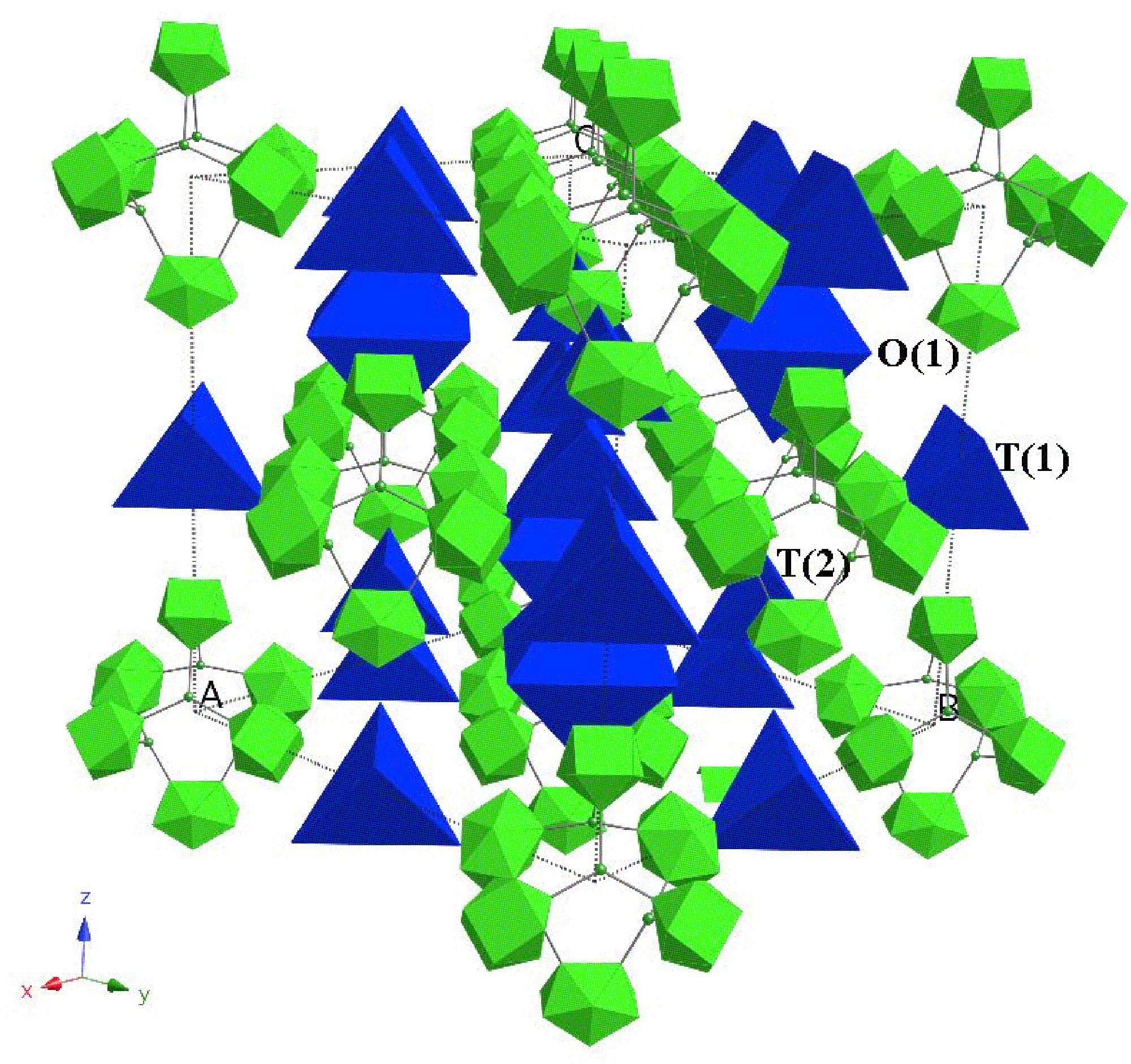
Fig. 25. Boron framework structure of Sc_{0.83–x}B_{10.0–y}C_{0.17+y}Si_{0.083–z} depicted by supertetrahedra T(1) and T(2), superoctahedron O(1) and the superoctahedron based on B_{10} polyhedron. Vertexes of each superpolyhedron are adjusted to the center of the constituent icosahedra, thus the real volumes of these superpolyhedra are larger than appear in the picture.

Using these large polyhedra, the crystal structure of Sc_{0.83–x}B_{10.0–y}C_{0.17+y}Si_{0.083–z} can be described as shown in figure 25. Owing to the crystal symmetry, the tetrahedral coordination between these superstructure units is again a key factor. The supertetrahedron T(1) lies at the body center and at the edge center of the unit cell. The superoctahedra O(1) locate at the body center (0.25, 0.25, 0.25) of the quarter of the unit cell. They coordinate tetrahedrally around T(1) forming a giant tetrahedron. The supertetrahedra T(2) are located at the symmetry-related positions (0.25, 0.25, 0.75); they also form a giant tetrahedron surrounding T(1). Edges of both giant tetrahedra orthogonally cross each other at their centers; at those edge centers, each B_{10} polyhedron bridges all the super-structure clusters T(1), T(2) and O(1). The superoctahedron built of B_{10} polyhedra is located at each cubic face center.

Scandium atoms reside in the voids of the boron framework. Four Sc1 atoms form a tetrahedral arrangement inside the B_{10} polyhedron-based superoctahedron. Sc2 atoms sit between the B_{10} polyhedron-based superoctahedron and the O(1) superoctahedron. Three Sc3 atoms form a triangle and are surrounded by three B_{10} polyhedra, a supertetrahedron T(1) and a superoctahedron O(1).

=== ScB_{14–x}C_{x} (x = 1.1) and ScB_{15}C_{1.6} ===
ScB_{14–x}C_{x} has an orthorhombic crystal structure with space group Imma (No. 74) and lattice constants of a = 0.56829(2), b = 0.80375(3) and c = 1.00488(4) nm. The crystal structure of ScB_{14–x}C_{x} is isotypic to that of MgAlB_{14} where Sc occupies the Mg site, the Al site is empty and the boron bridge site is a B/C mixed-occupancy site with the occupancy of B/C = 0.45/0.55. The occupancy of the Sc site in flux-grown single crystals is 0.964(4), i.e. almost 1. Solid-state powder-reaction growth resulted in lower Sc site occupancy and in the resulting chemical composition ScB_{15}C_{1.6}. The B-C bonding distance 0.1796(3) nm between the B/C bridge sites is rather long as compared with that (0.15–0.16 nm) of an ordinary B-C covalent bond, that suggests weak bonding between the B/C bridge sites.

=== Sc_{4.5–x}B_{57–y+z}C_{3.5–z} ===
Sc_{4.5–x}B_{57–y+z}C_{3.5–z} (x = 0.27, y = 1.1, z = 0.2) has an orthorhombic crystal structure with space group Pbam (No. 55) and lattice constants of a = 1.73040(6), b = 1.60738(6) and c = 1.44829(6) nm. This phase is indicated as ScB_{12.5}C_{0.8} (phase IV) in the phase diagram of figure 17. This rare orthorhombic structure has 78 atomic positions in the unit cell: seven partially occupied Sc sites, four C sites, 66 B sites including three partially occupied sites and one B/C mixed-occupancy site. Atomic coordinates, site occupancies and isotropic displacement factors are listed in table IX.

More than 500 atoms are available in the unit cell. In the crystal structure, there are six structurally independent icosahedra I1–I6, which are constructed from B1–B12, B13–B24, B25–B32, B33–B40, B41–B44 and B45–B56 sites, respectively; B57–B62 sites form a B_{8} polyhedron. The Sc_{4.5–x}B_{57–y+z}C_{3.5–z} crystal structure is layered, as shown in figure 26. This structure has been described in terms of two kinds of boron icosahedron layers, L1 and L2. L1 consists of the icosahedra I3, I4 and I5 and the C65 "dimer", and L2 consists of the icosahedra I2 and I6. I1 is sandwiched by L1 and L2 and the B_{8} polyhedron is sandwiched by L2.

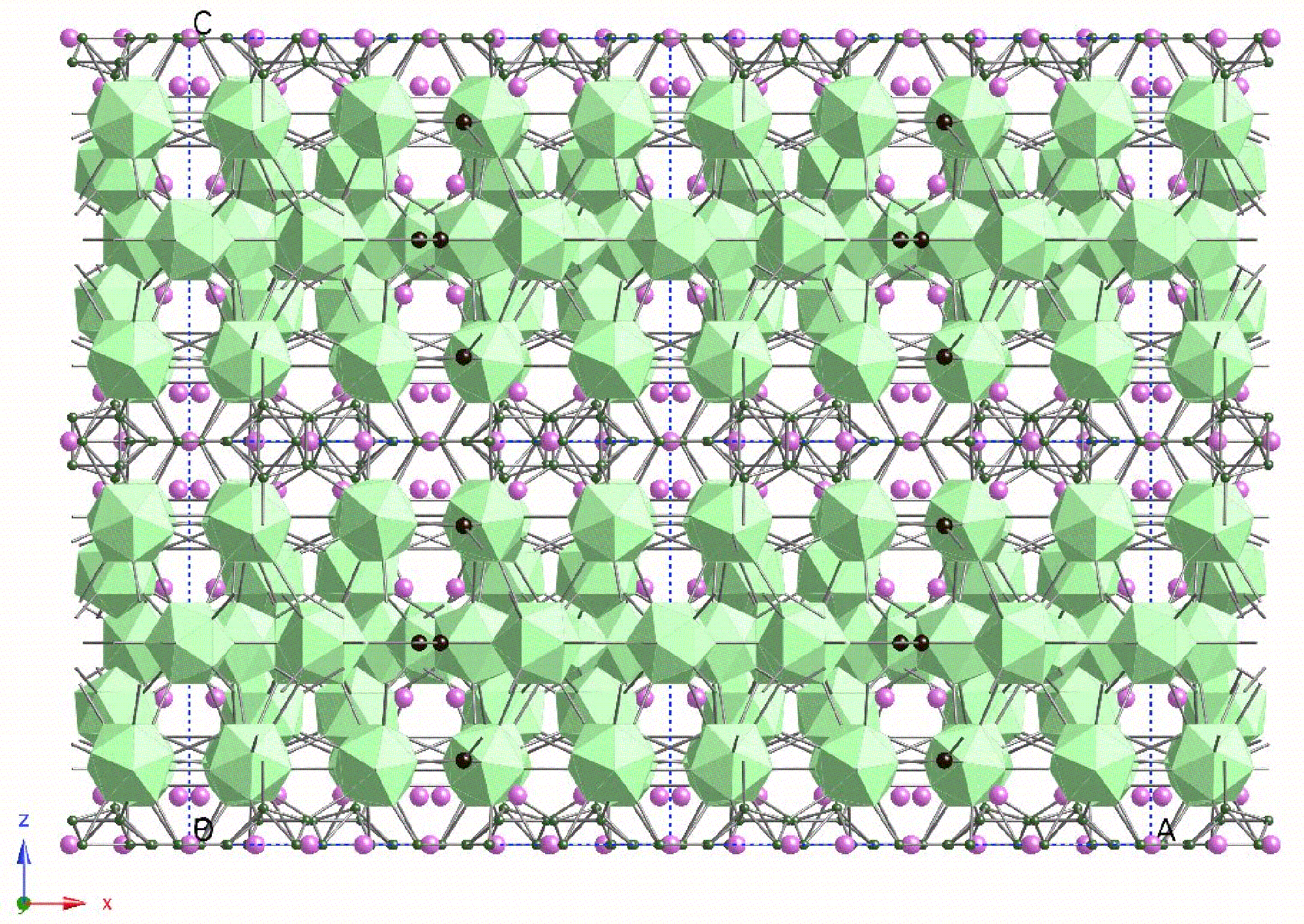
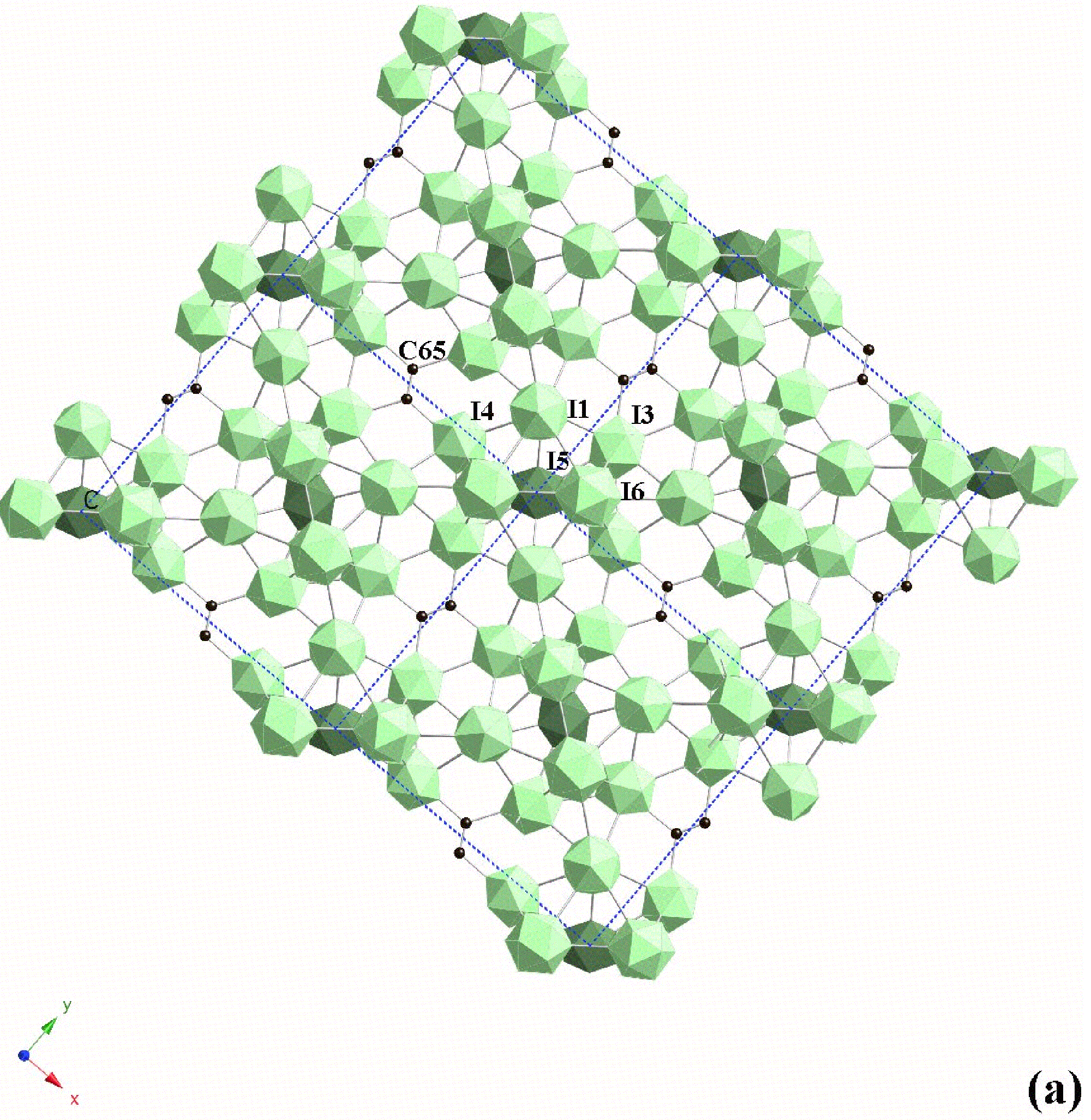
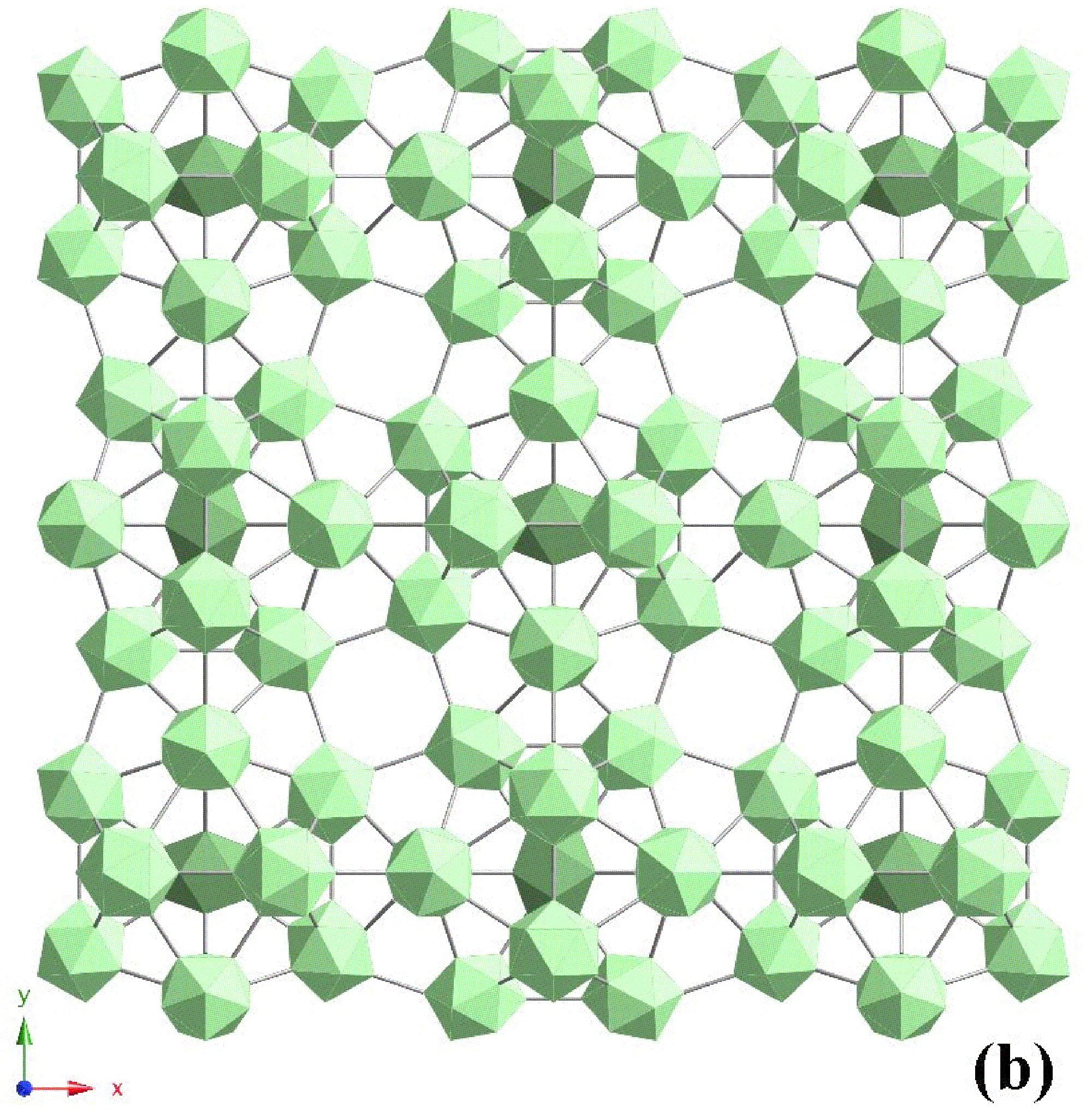
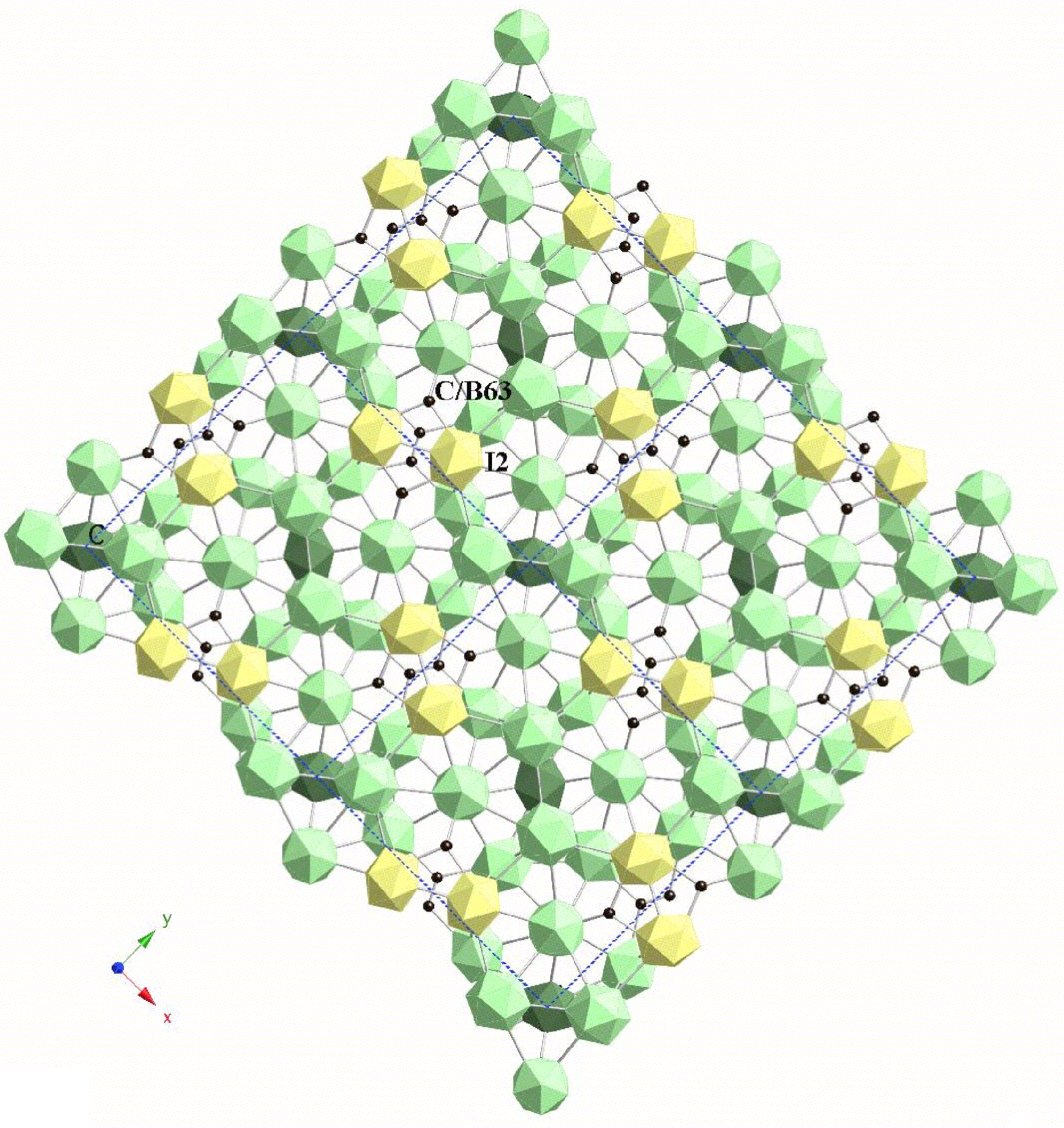
Fig. 26. Sc_{4.5–x}B_{57–y+z}C_{3.5–z} crystal structure viewed along the [010] direction; 2.5 and 2 unit-cell sizes are depicted along the x-axis and z-axis, respectively. Fig. 27. Two-dimensional presentation of supericosahedron connection in (a) Sc_{4.5–x}B_{57–y+z}C_{3.5–z} and (b) YB_{66}. The central icosahedra of the supericosahedron are dark green. Fig. 28. Locations of the I2 icosahedron (yellow) in the 2-dimensional supericosahedron framework of Sc_{4.5–x}B_{57–y+z}C_{3.5–z}.

An alternative description is based on the same B_{12}(B_{12})_{12}supericosahedron as in the YB_{66} structure. In the YB_{66} crystal structure, the supericosahedra form 3-dimensional boron framework as shown in figure 5. In this framework, the neighboring supericosahedra are rotated 90° with respect to each other. On the contrary, in Sc_{4.5–x}B_{57–y+z}C_{3.5–z} the supericosahedra form a 2-dimensional network where the 90° rotation relation is broken because of the orthorhombic symmetry. The planar projections of the supericosahedron connection in Sc_{4.5–x}B_{57–y+z}C_{3.5–z} and YB_{66} are shown in figures 27a and b, respectively. In the YB_{66} crystal structure, the neighboring 2-dimensional supericosahedron connections are out-of-phase for the rotational relation of the supericosahedron. This allows 3-dimensional stacking of the 2-dimensional supericosahedron connection while maintaining the cubic symmetry.

The B_{80} boron cluster occupies the large space between four supericosahedra as described in the REB_{66} section. On the other hand, the 2-dimensional supericosahedron networks in the Sc_{4.5–x}B_{57–y+z}C_{3.5–z} crystal structure stack in-phase along the z-axis. Instead of the B_{80} cluster, a pair of the I2 icosahedra fills the open space staying within the supericosahedron network, as shown in figure 28 where the icosahedron I2 is colored in yellow.

All Sc atoms except for Sc3 reside in large spaces between the supericosahedron networks, and the Sc3 atom occupies a void in the network as shown in figure 26. Because of the small size of Sc atom, the occupancies of the Sc1–Sc5 sites exceed 95%, and those of Sc6 and Sc7 sites are approximately 90% and 61%, respectively (see table IX).

=== Sc_{3.67–x}B_{41.4–y–z}C_{0.67+z}Si_{0.33–w} ===
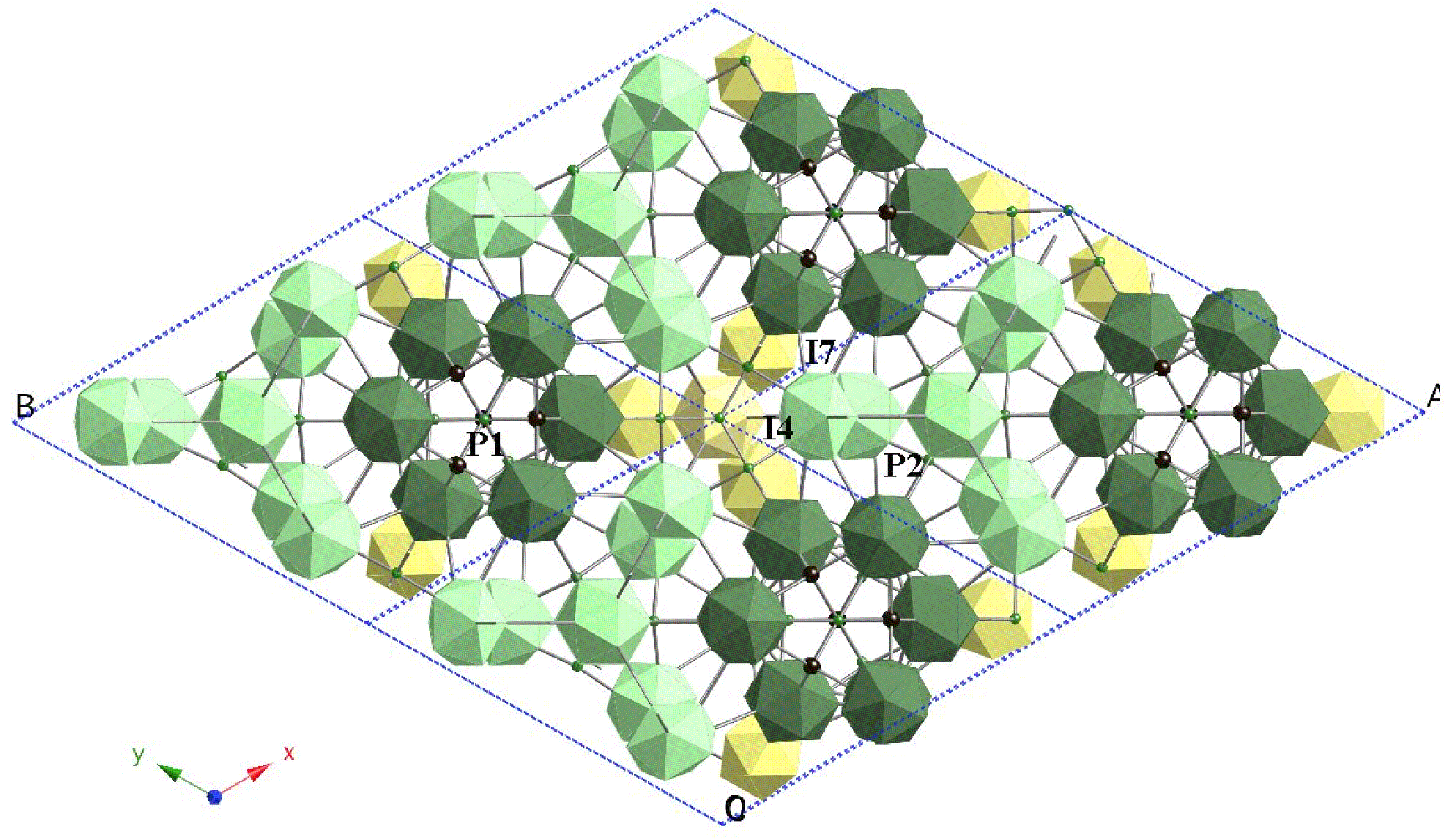
Fig. 29. Boron framework structure of Sc_{3.67–x}B_{41.4–y–z}C_{0.67+z}Si_{0.33–w} viewed along the c-axis.

Sc_{3.67–x}B_{41.4–y–z}C_{0.67+z}Si_{0.33–w} (x = 0.52, y = 1.42, z = 1.17 and w = 0.02) has a hexagonal crystal structure with space group P6̅m2 (No. 187) and lattice constants a = b = 1.43055(8) and c = 2.37477(13) nm. Single crystals of this compound were obtained as an intergrowth phase in a float-zoned single crystal of Sc_{0.83–x}B_{10.0–y}C_{0.17+y}Si_{0.083–z}. This phase is not described in the phase diagram of figure 17 because it is a quaternary compound. Its hexagonal structure is rare and has 79 atomic positions in the unit cell: eight partially occupied Sc sites, 62 B sites, two C sites, two Si sites and six B/C sites. Six B sites and one of the two Si sites have partial occupancies. The associated atomic coordinates, site occupancies and isotropic displacement factors are listed in table X.

There are seven structurally independent icosahedra I1–I7 which are formed by B1–B8, B9–B12, B13–B20, B/C21–B24, B/C25–B29, B30–B37 and B/C38–B42 sites, respectively; B43–B46 sites form the B_{9} polyhedron and B47–B53 sites construct the B_{10} polyhedron. B54–B59 sites form the irregularly shaped B_{16} polyhedron in which only 10.7 boron atoms are available because most of sites are too close to each other to be occupied simultaneously. Ten bridging sites C60–B69 interconnect polyhedron units or other bridging sites to form a 3D boron framework structure. One description of the crystal structure uses three pillar-like units that extend along the c-axis that however results in undesired overlaps between those three pillar-like units. An alternative is to define two pillar-like structure units. Figure 29 shows the boron framework structure of Sc_{3.67–x}B_{41.4–y–z}C_{0.67+z}Si_{0.33–w} viewed along the c-axis, where the pillar-like units P1 and P2 are colored in dark green and light green respectively and are bridged by yellow icosahedra I4 and I7.

These pillar-like units P1 and P2 are shown in figures 30a and b, respectively. P1 consists of icosahedra I1 and I3, an irregularly shaped B_{16} polyhedron and other bridge site atoms where two supericosahedra can be seen above and below the B_{16} polyhedron. Each supericosahedron is formed by three icosahedra I1 and three icosahedra I3 and is the same as the supericosahedron O(1) shown in figure 24a.The P2 unit consists of icosahedra I2, I5 and I6, B_{10} polyhedron and other bridge site atoms. Eight Sc sites with occupancies between 0.49 (Sc8) and 0.98 (Sc1) spread over the boron framework.

As described above, this hexagonal phase originates from a cubic phase, and thus one may expect a similar structural element in these phases. There is an obvious relation between the hexagonal ab-plane and the cubic (111) plane. Figures 31a and b show the hexagonal (001) and the cubic (111) planes, respectively. Both network structures are almost the same that allows intergrowth of the hexagonal phase in the cubic phase.

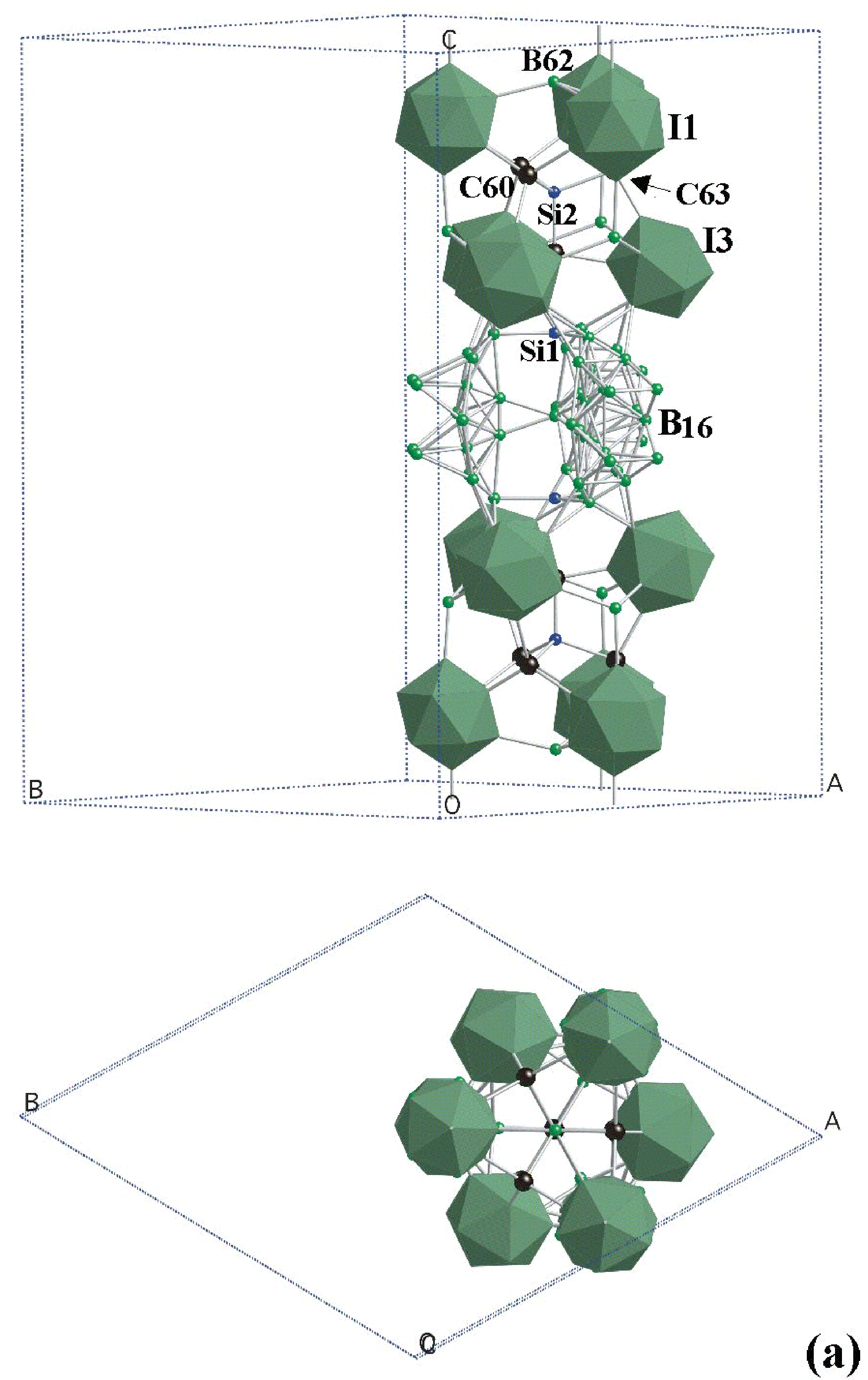
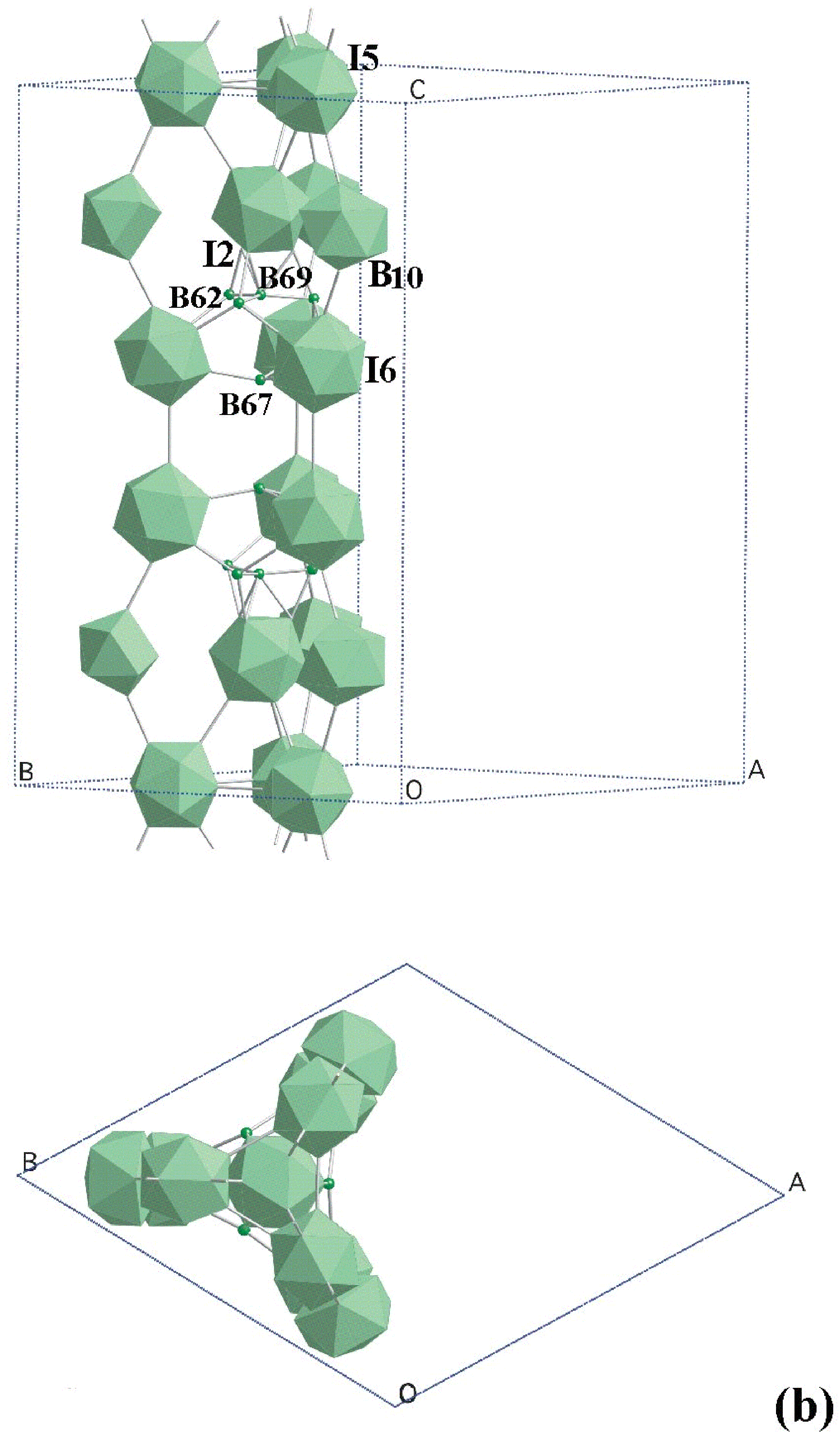
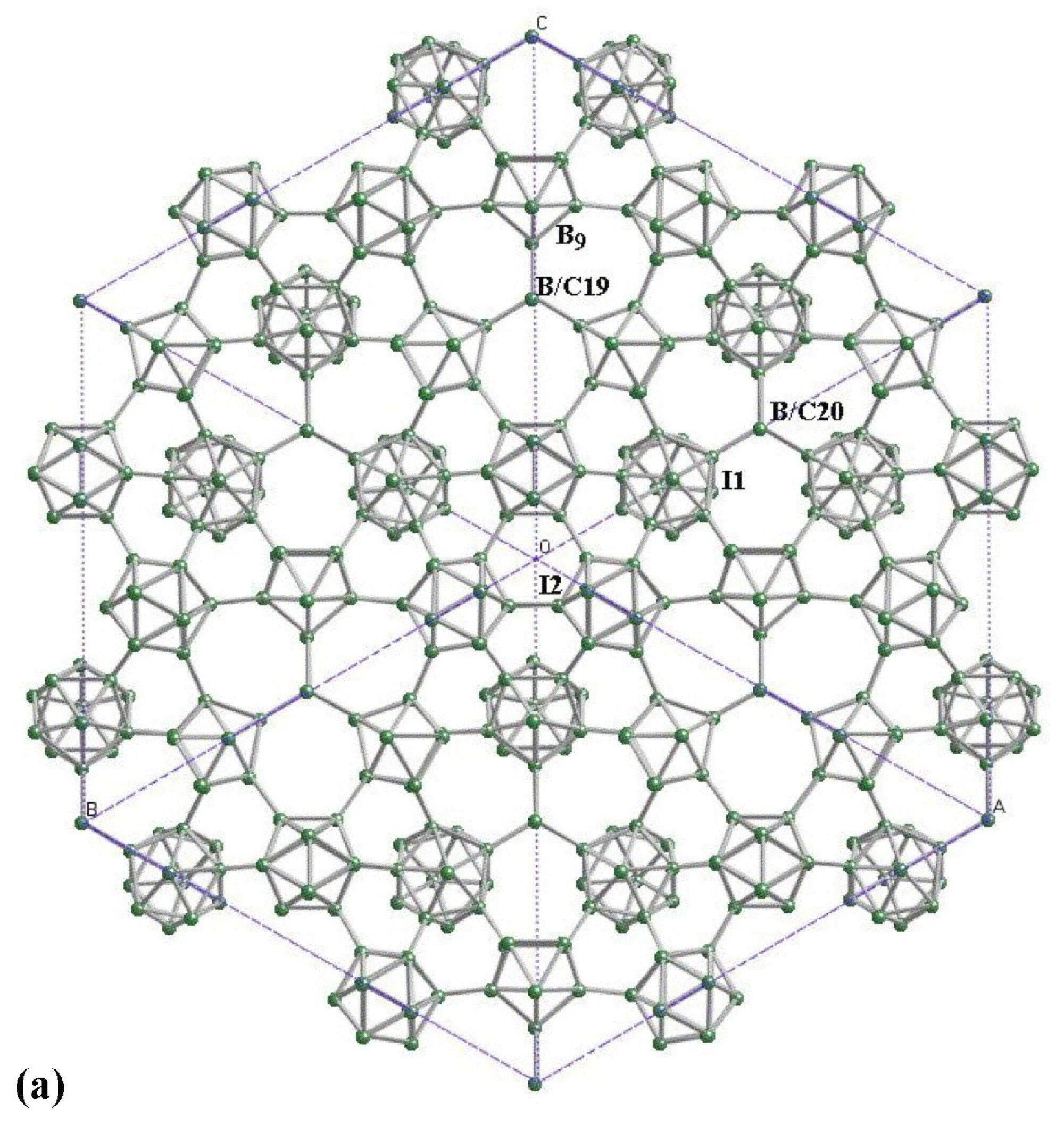
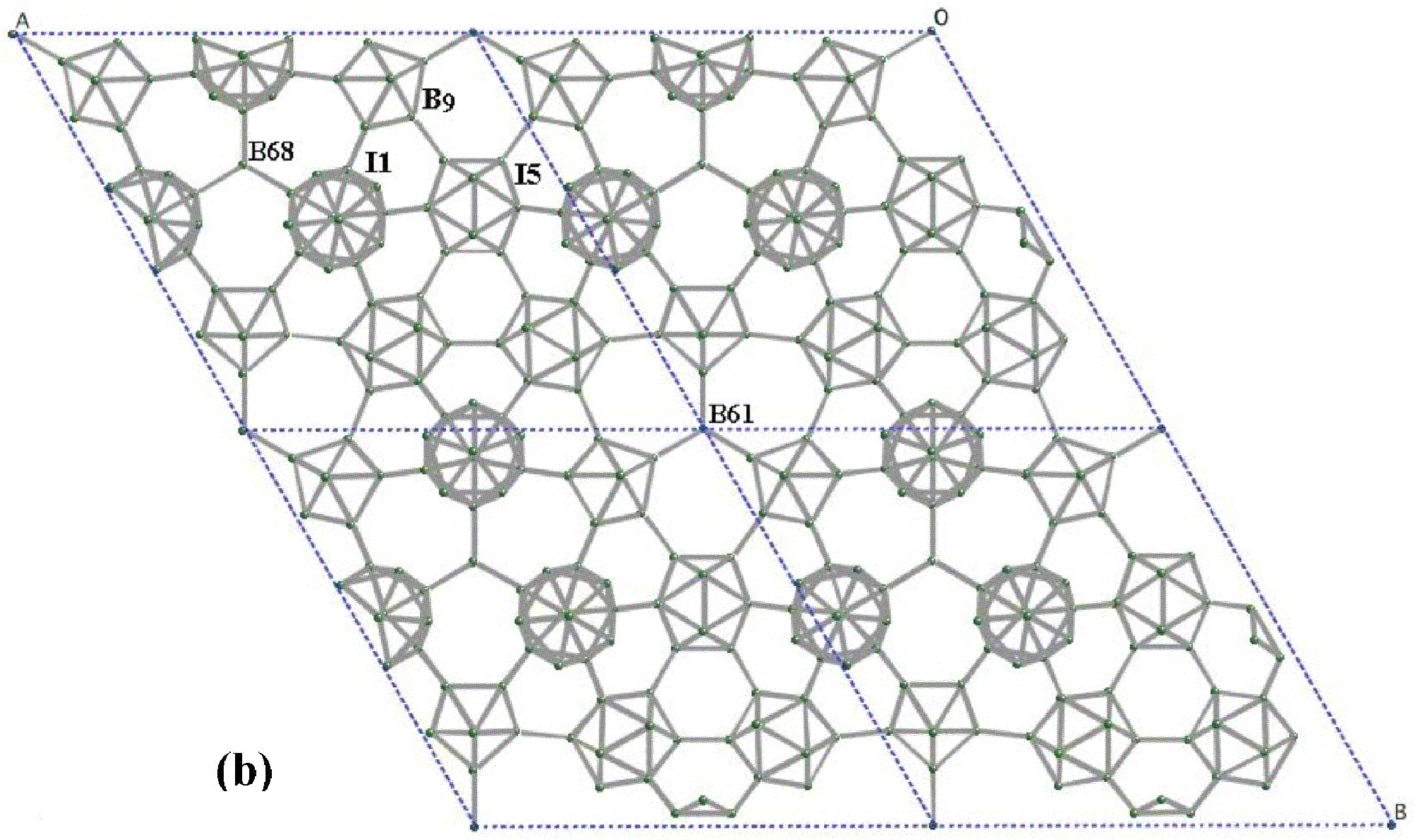
Fig. 30. (a) Pillar-like structure unit P1 that consists of icosahedra I1 and I3, irregularly shaped B_{16} polyhedron and other bridge site atoms. (b) Pillar-like structure unit P2 that consists of icosahedra I2, I5 and I6, B_{10} polyhedron and other bridge site atoms. Fig. 31. (a) The sliced (111) network structure of the cubic phase, and (b) the (001)-oriented boron network layer of the hexagonal phase.

== Applications ==
The diversity of the crystal structures of rare-earth borides results in unusual physical properties and potential applications in thermopower generation. Thermal conductivity of boron icosahedra based compounds is low because of their complex crystal structure; this property is favored for thermoelectric materials. On the other hand, these compounds exhibit very low (variable range hopping type) p-type electrical conductivity. Increasing the conductivity is a key issue for thermoelectric applications of these borides.

YB_{66} is used as a soft-X-ray monochromator for dispersing 1–2 keV synchrotron radiation at some synchrotron radiation facilities. Contrary to thermoelectric applications, high thermal conductivity is desirable for synchrotron radiation monochromators. YB_{66} exhibits low, amorphous-like thermal conductivity. However, transition metal doping increases the thermal conductivity twice in YNb_{0.3}B_{62} as compared to undoped YB_{66}.
