= List of diplomatic missions in Belgium =

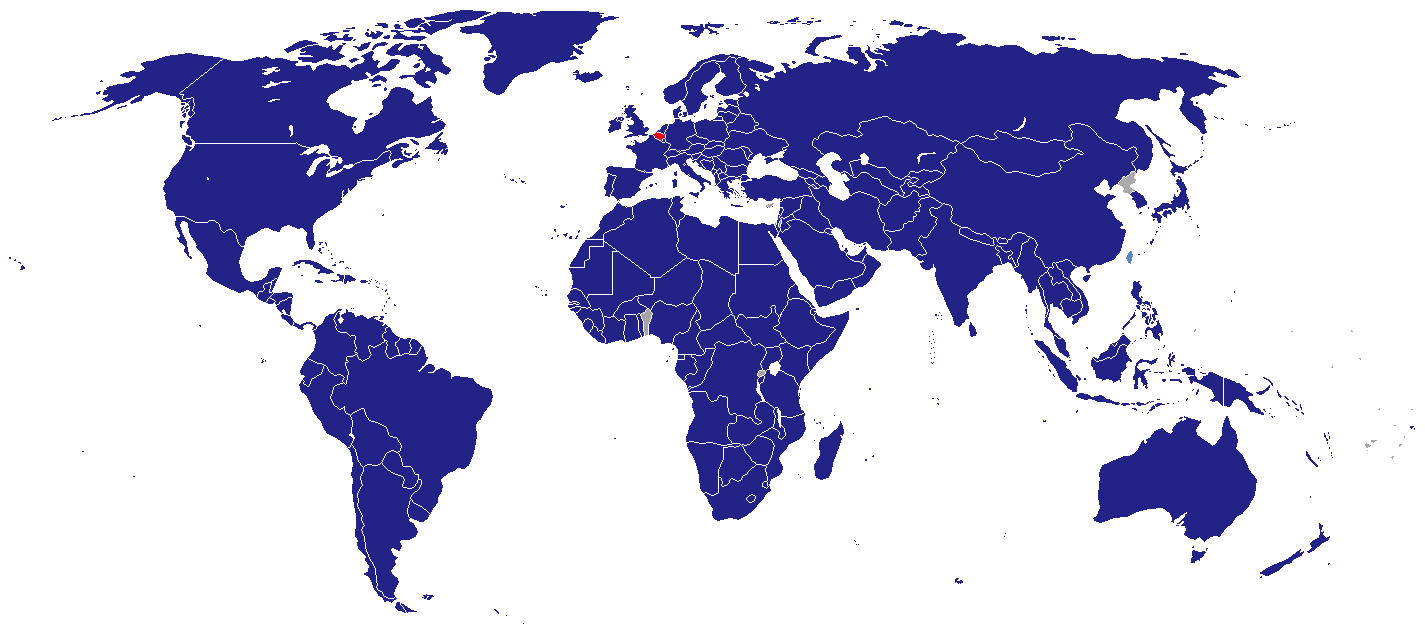
Map of diplomatic missions in Belgium

This article lists diplomatic missions resident in the Kingdom of Belgium. This listing excludes honorary consulates.

At present, the capital city of Brussels hosts 183 embassies. Brussels is unique in that it is not only the seat of the Belgian Government, but also of the European Commission, which is the executive wing of the European Union to which countries accredit representatives, and of the NATO. Thus, a country can maintain up to three missions in Brussels: one to Belgium, one to the EU, and one to the NATO. Some embassies serve all three functions, while other countries open separate embassies for each, or combine any two of the functions in one embassy.

== Embassies ==
1. Afghanistan
2. Albania
3. Algeria
4. Andorra
5. Angola
6. Antigua and Barbuda
7. Argentina
8. Armenia
9. Australia
10. Austria
11. Azerbaijan
12. Bahamas
13. Bahrain
14. Bangladesh
15. Barbados
16. Belarus
17. Belize
18. Bhutan
19. Bolivia
20. Bosnia and Herzegovina
21. Botswana
22. Brazil
23. Brunei
24. Bulgaria
25. Burkina Faso
26. Burundi
27. Cambodia
28. Cameroon
29. Canada
30. Cape Verde
31. Central African Republic
32. Chad
33. Chile
34. China
35. Colombia
36. Comoros
37. Congo-Brazzaville
38. Congo-Kinshasa
39. Costa Rica
40. Croatia
41. Cuba
42. Czech Republic
43. Denmark
44. Djibouti
45. Dominica
46. Dominican Republic
47. Ecuador
48. Egypt
49. El Salvador
50. Equatorial Guinea
51. Eritrea
52. Estonia
53. Eswatini
54. Ethiopia
55. Finland
56. France
57. Gabon
58. Gambia
59. Georgia
60. Germany
61. Ghana
62. Grenada
63. Greece
64. Guatemala
65. Guinea
66. Guinea-Bissau
67. Guyana
68. Haiti
69. Holy See
70. Honduras
71. Hungary
72. Iceland
73. India
74. Indonesia
75. Iran
76. Iraq
77. Ireland
78. Israel
79. Italy
80. Ivory Coast
81. Jamaica
82. Japan
83. Jordan
84. Kazakhstan
85. Kenya
86. Kosovo
87. Kuwait
88. Kyrgyzstan
89. Laos
90. Latvia
91. Lebanon
92. Lesotho
93. Liberia
94. Libya
95. Liechtenstein
96. Lithuania
97. Luxembourg
98. Madagascar
99. Malawi
100. Malaysia
101. Maldives
102. Mali
103. Malta
104. Mauritania
105. Mauritius
106. Mexico
107. Moldova
108. Monaco
109. Mongolia
110. Montenegro
111. Morocco
112. Mozambique
113. Myanmar
114. Namibia
115. Nepal
116. Netherlands
117. New Zealand
118. Nicaragua
119. Niger
120. Nigeria
121. North Macedonia
122. Norway
123. Oman
124. Pakistan
125. Panama
126. Papua New Guinea
127. Paraguay
128. Peru
129. Philippines
130. Poland
131. Portugal
132. Qatar
133. Romania
134. Russia
135. Saint Kitts and Nevis
136. Saint Lucia
137. Saint Vincent and the Grenadines
138. Samoa
139. San Marino
140. São Tomé and Príncipe
141. Saudi Arabia
142. Senegal
143. Serbia
144. Seychelles
145. Sierra Leone
146. Singapore
147. Slovakia
148. Slovenia
149. Solomon Islands
150. Somalia
151. South Africa
152. South Korea
153. South Sudan
154. Spain
155. Sri Lanka
156. Sudan
157. Suriname
158. Sweden
159. Switzerland
160. Syria
161. Tajikistan
162. Tanzania
163. Thailand
164. Timor-Leste
165. Togo
166. Trinidad and Tobago
167. Tunisia
168. Turkey
169. Turkmenistan
170. Tuvalu
171. Uganda
172. Ukraine
173. United Arab Emirates
174. United Kingdom
175. United States
176. Uruguay
177. Uzbekistan
178. Vanuatu
179. Venezuela
180. Vietnam
181. Yemen
182. Zambia
183. Zimbabwe

== Delegations/Missions to the European Union ==
1. African Union
2. Albania
3. Armenia
4. Austria
5. Azerbaijan
6. Belgium
7. Bosnia and Herzegovina
8. Brazil
9. Bulgaria
10. Canada
11. China
12. Croatia
13. Cyprus
14. Czech Republic
15. Denmark
16. Egypt
17. Estonia
18. Finland
19. France
20. Georgia
21. Germany
22. Greece
23. Holy See
24. Hungary
25. Iraq
26. Ireland
27. Israel
28. Italy
29. Japan
30. Kazakhstan
31. Latvia
32. Libya
33. Lithuania
34. Luxembourg
35. Malta
36. Mexico
37. Moldova
38. Montenegro
39. Morocco
40. Netherlands
41. Niue
42. North Macedonia
43. Norway
44. New Zealand
45. Pakistan
46. Palestine
47. Poland
48. Portugal
49. Romania
50. Russia
51. Saudi Arabia
52. Serbia
53. Slovakia
54. Slovenia
55. South Korea
56. Sovereign Military Order of Malta
57. Spain
58. Sweden
59. Switzerland
60. Syria
61. Turkey
62. Turkmenistan
63. Ukraine
64. United Arab Emirates
65. United Kingdom
66. United States

== Delegations/Missions to the North Atlantic Treaty Organization ==
1. Albania
2. Armenia (Note: see Permanent Mission of Armenia to NATO.)
3. Austria
4. Azerbaijan
5. Belgium
6. Bosnia and Herzegovina
7. Bulgaria
8. Canada
9. Croatia
10. Czech Republic
11. Denmark
12. Estonia
13. Finland
14. France
15. Georgia
16. Germany
17. Greece
18. Hungary
19. Iceland
20. Ireland
21. Italy
22. Kazakhstan
23. Latvia
24. Lithuania
25. Luxembourg
26. Malta
27. Moldova
28. Montenegro
29. Netherlands
30. North Macedonia
31. Norway
32. Poland
33. Portugal
34. Romania
35. Serbia
36. Slovakia
37. Slovenia
38. Spain
39. Sweden
40. Switzerland
41. Turkey
42. Ukraine
43. United Kingdom
44. United States (Note: see United States Mission to NATO.)

== Other missions or delegations ==
- Catalonia - Delegation of the Government of Catalonia to the European Union
- South Tyrol - Office of the Province of Bolzano/Bozen for Europaregion.
- Republic of China (Taiwan) - Representative Office in the EU and Belgium
- Faroe Islands (Kingdom of Denmark) - Mission to the European Union
- Greenland (Kingdom of Denmark) - Representation to the European Union
- Hong Kong - Economic & Trade Office
- Kurdistan - Representation in the European Union
- Macau - Economic & Trade Office
- Northern Cyprus - Representative Office
- Northern Ireland - Office of the Northern Ireland Executive in Brussels
- Organisation of Islamic Cooperation - Permanent Observer Mission
- Palestine - General Delegation
- Quebec (Canada) - General Delegation
- Sovereign Military Order of Malta - Delegation
- Scotland - Scotland House Brussels
- Wales - Welsh Government International Office

== Gallery ==
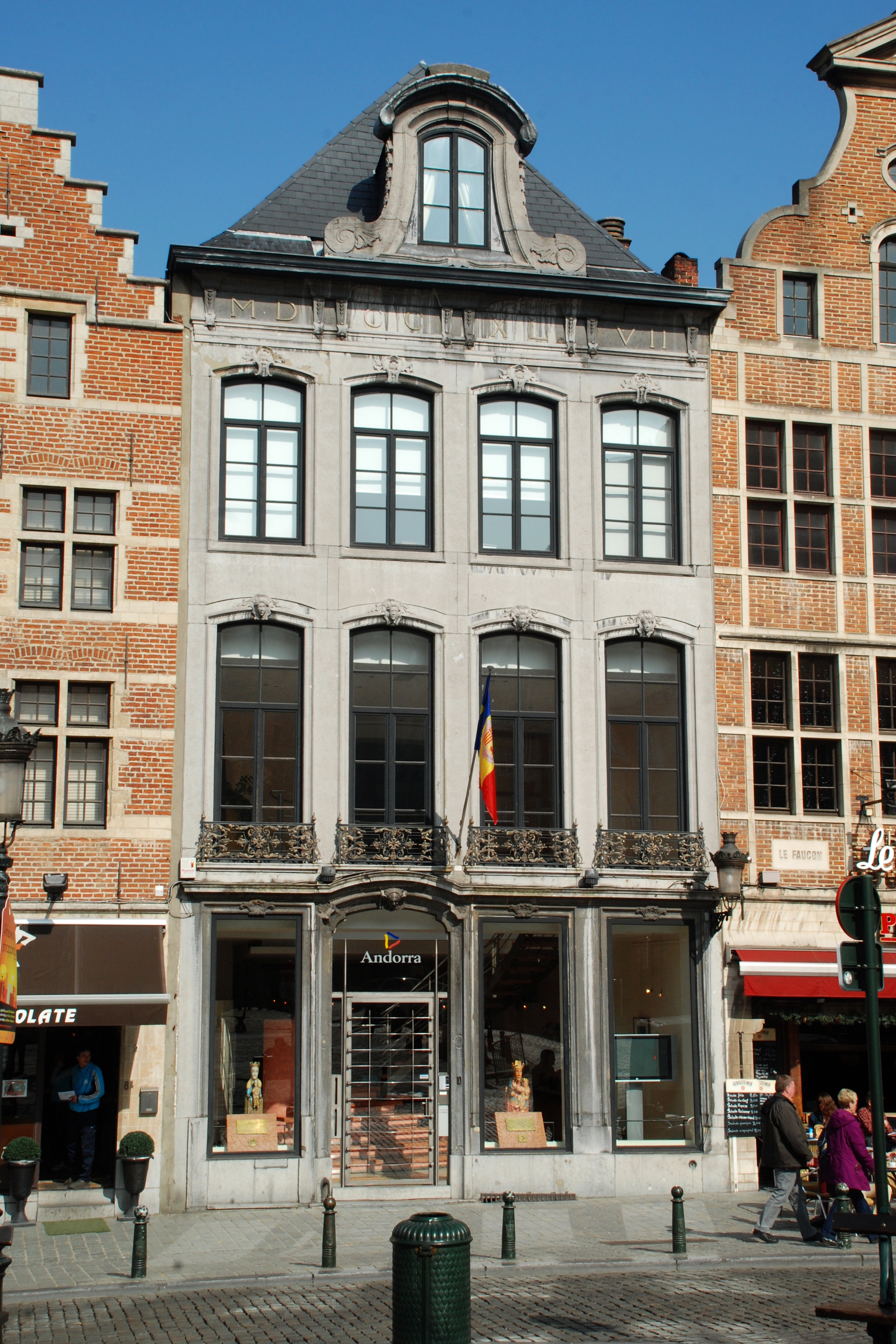
Embassy of Andorra

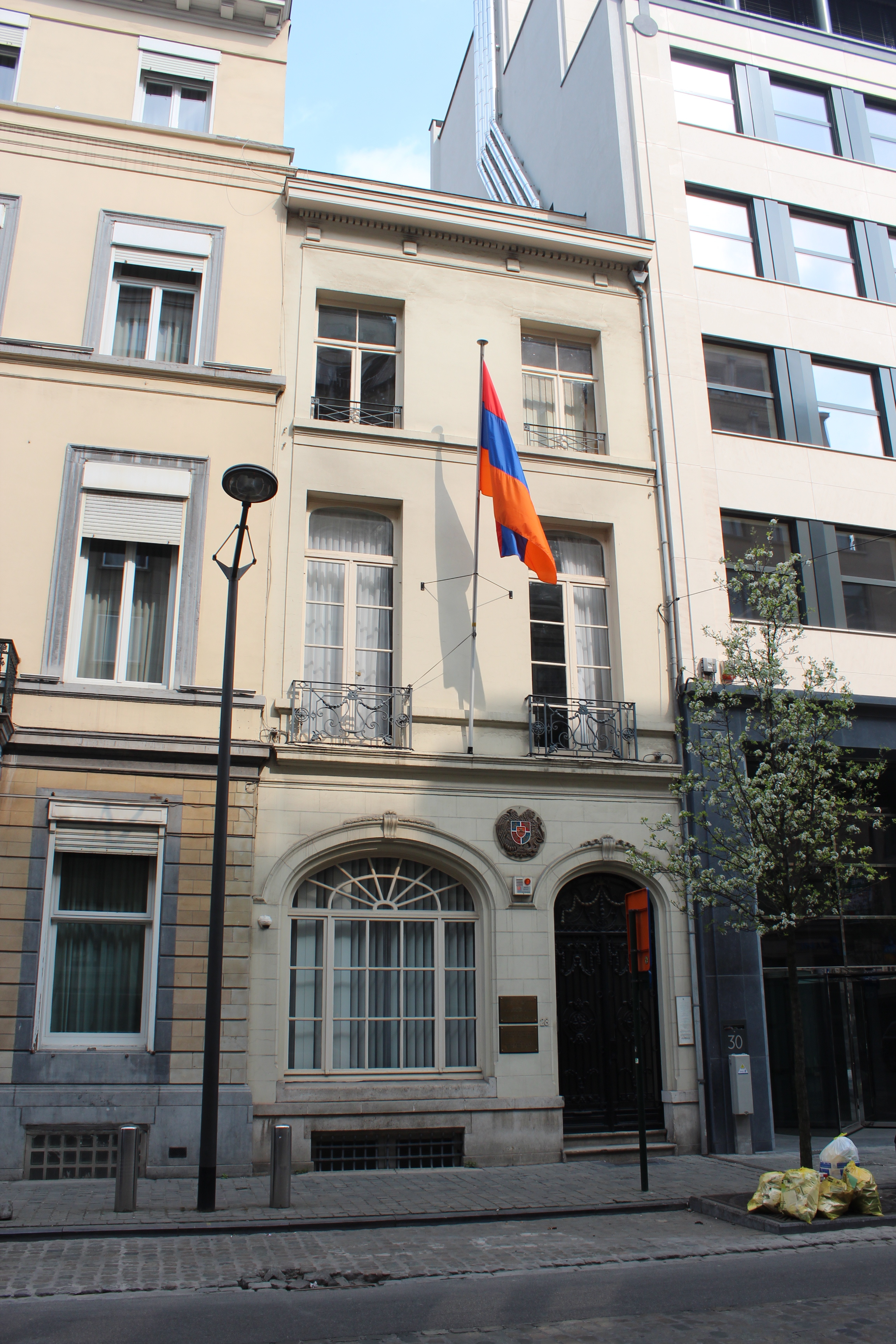
Embassy of Armenia

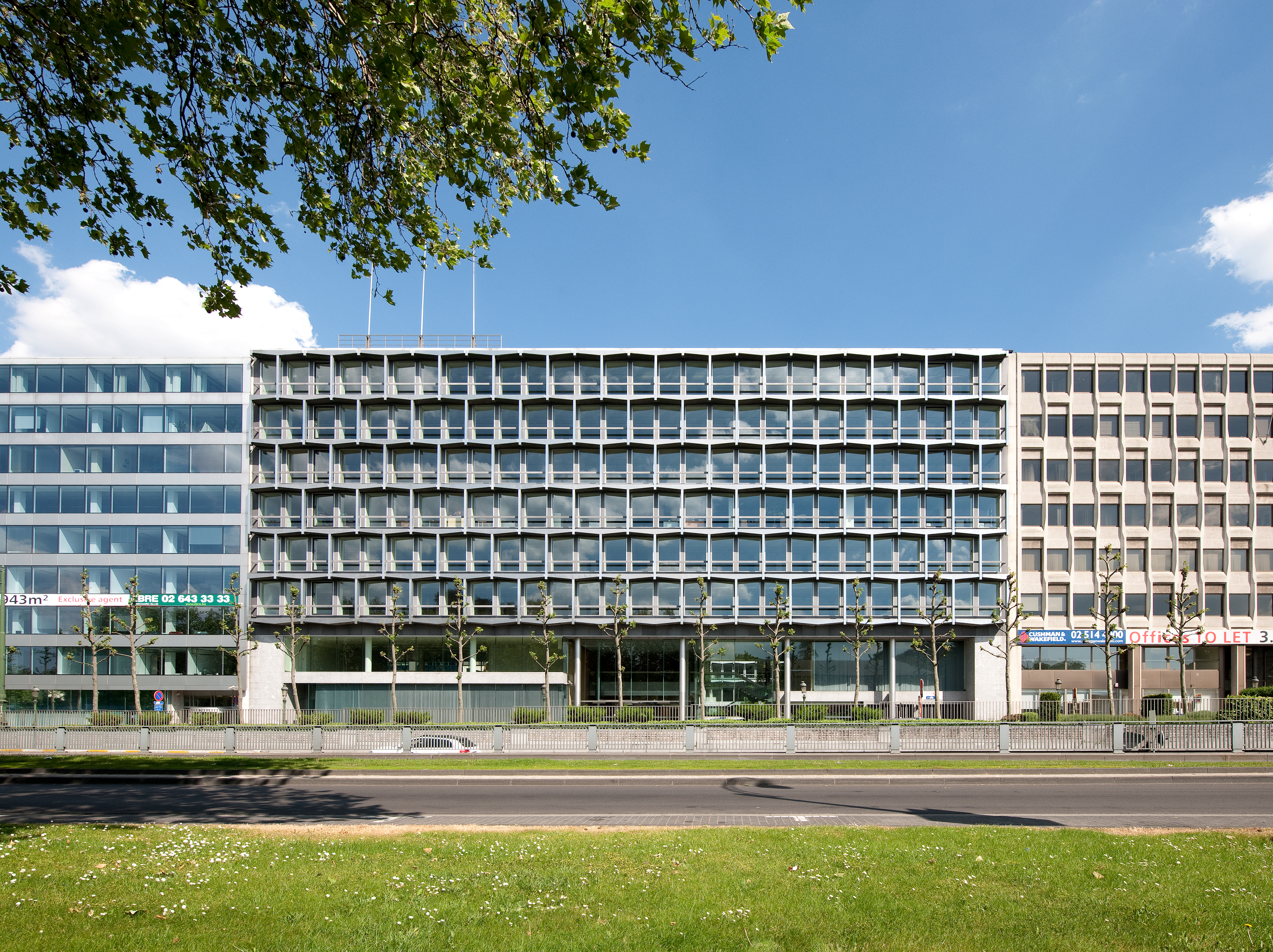
Embassy of Australia

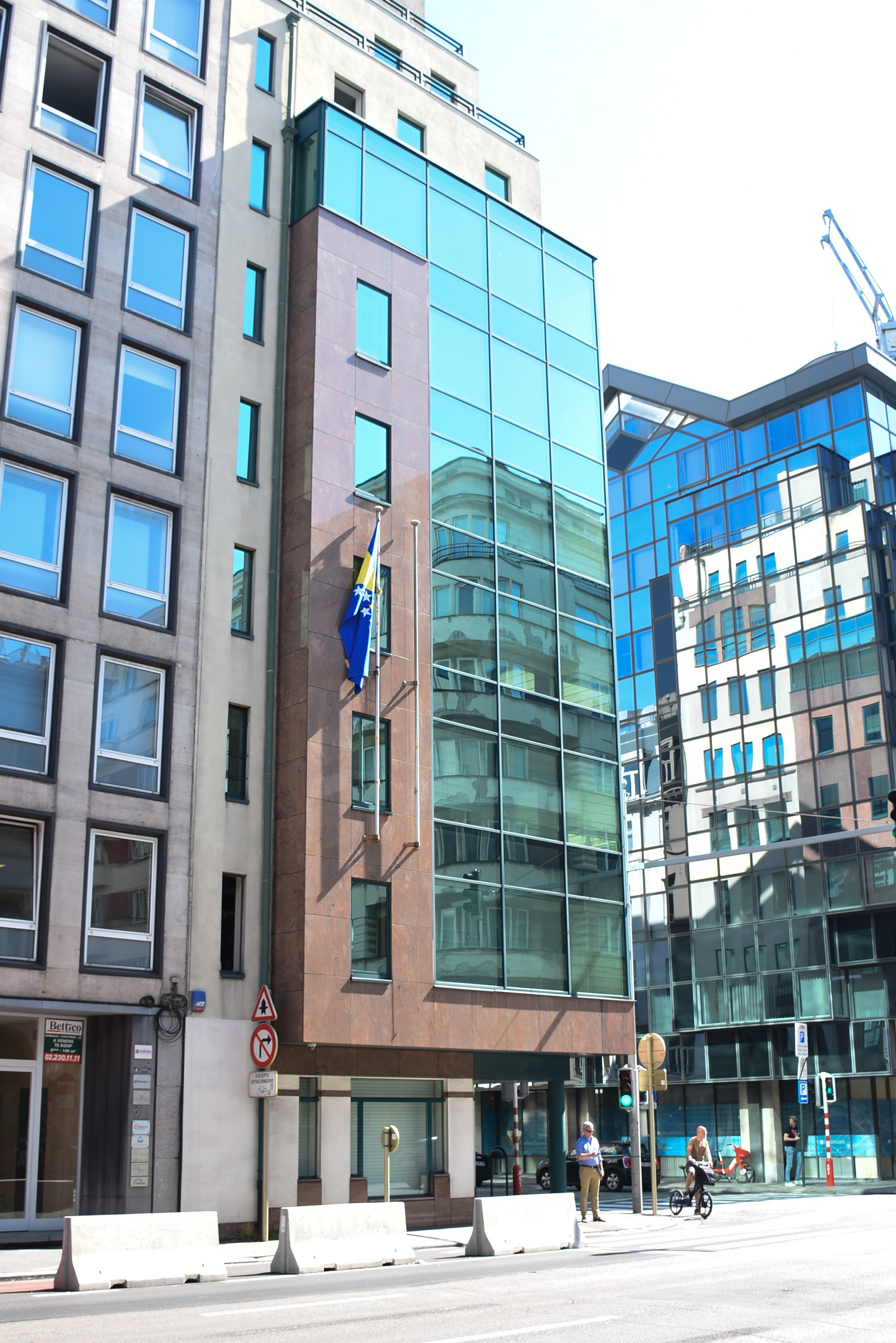
Embassy of Bosnia and Herzegovina

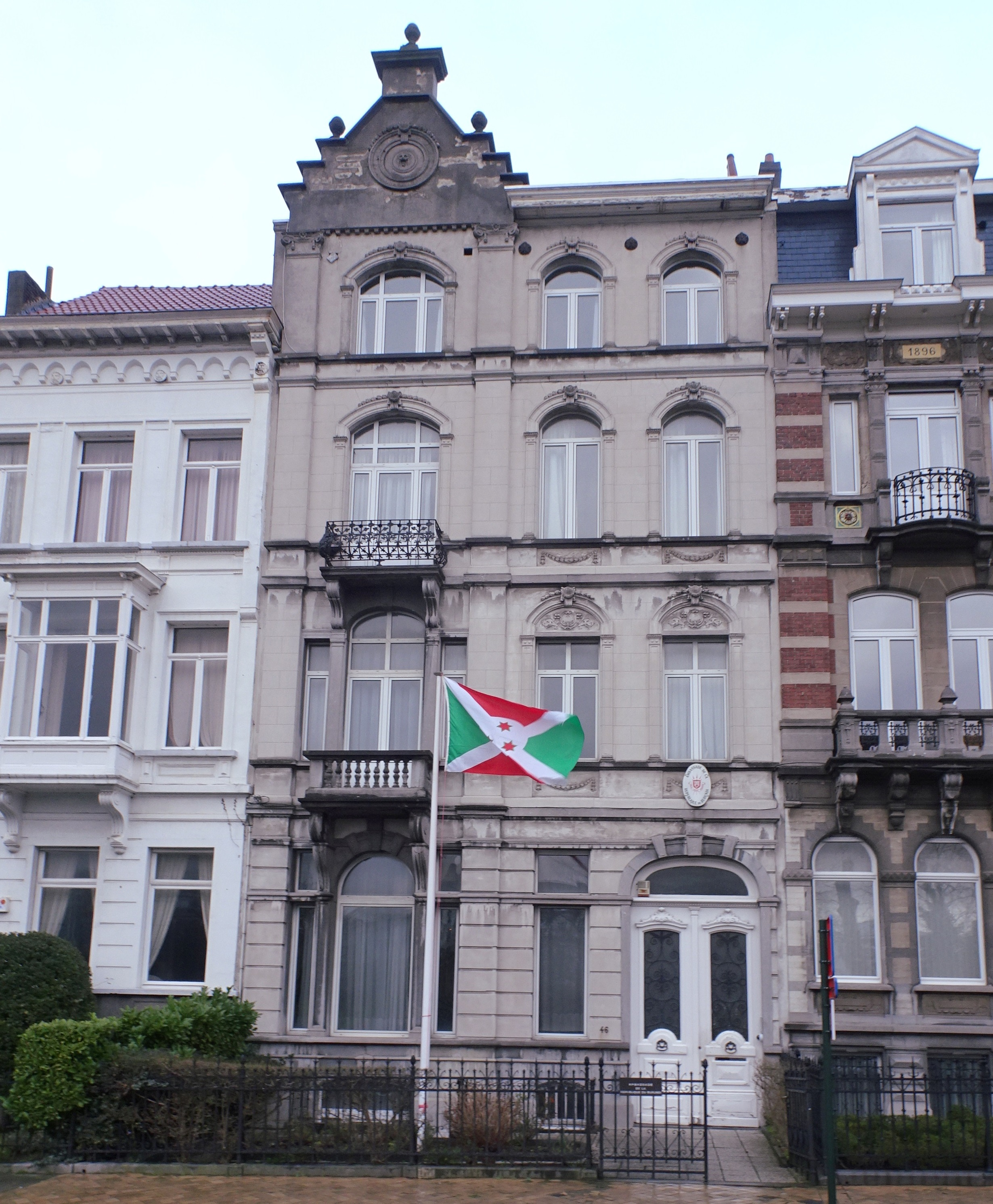
Embassy of Burundi

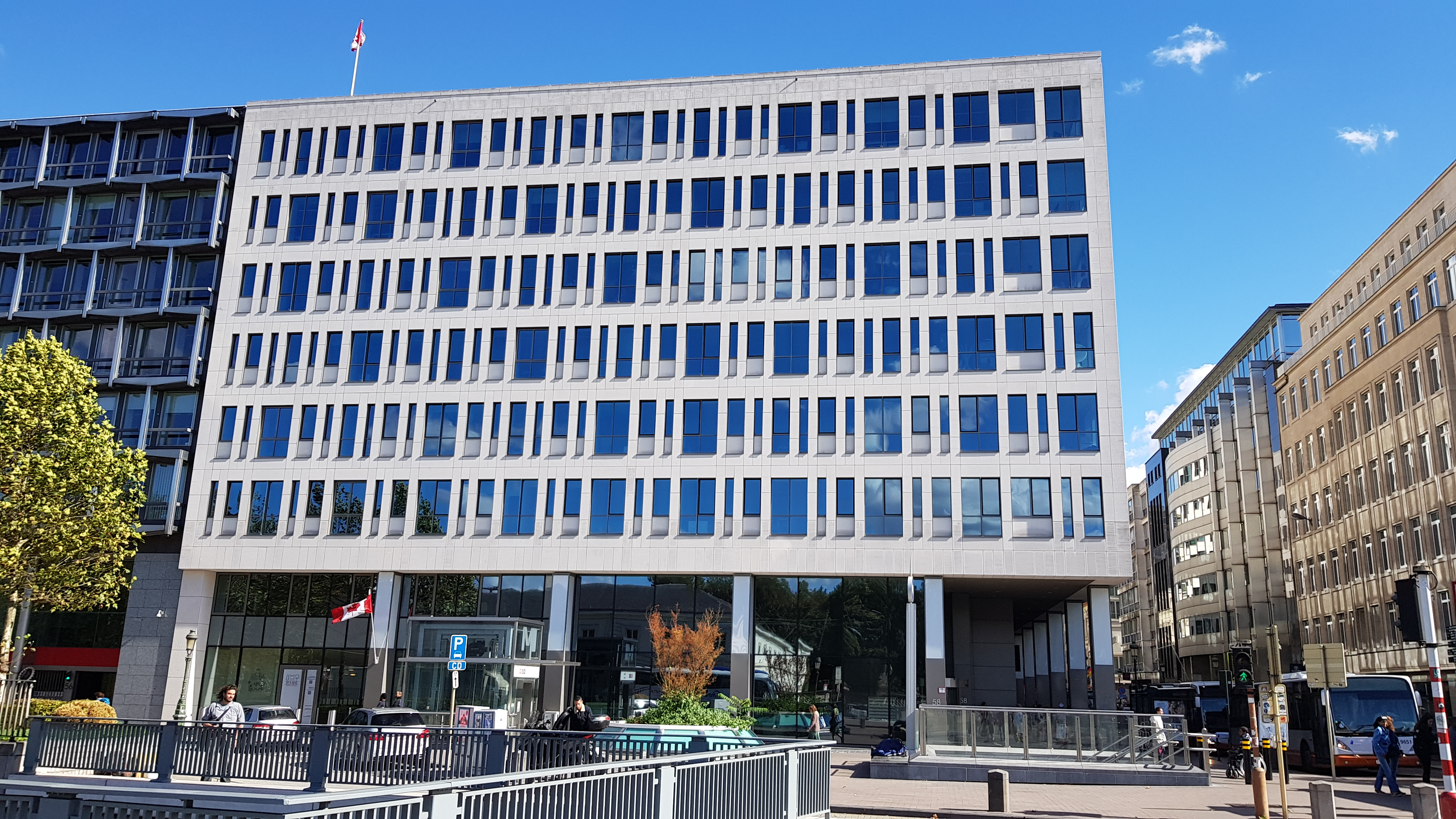
Embassy of Canada

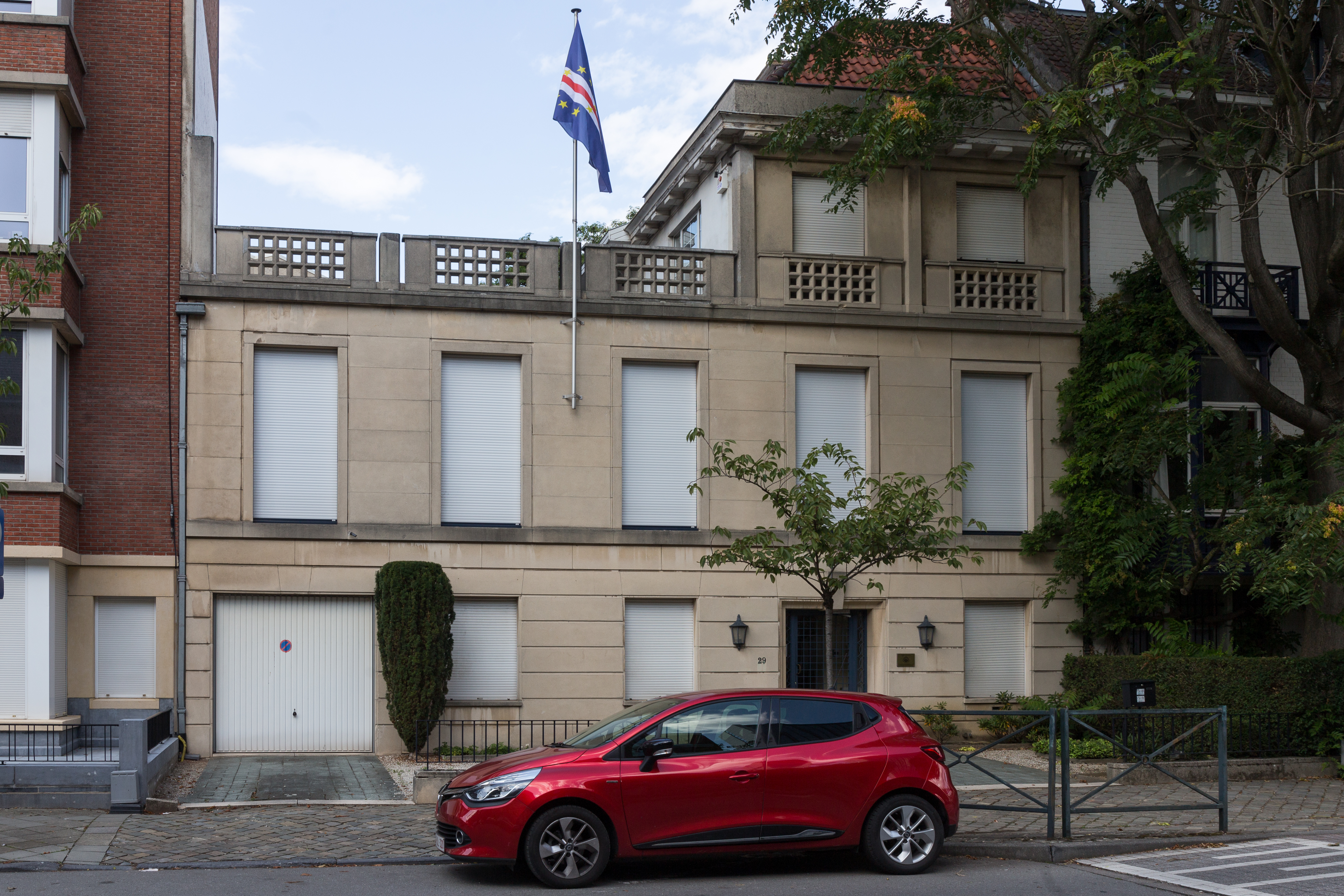
Embassy of Cape Verde

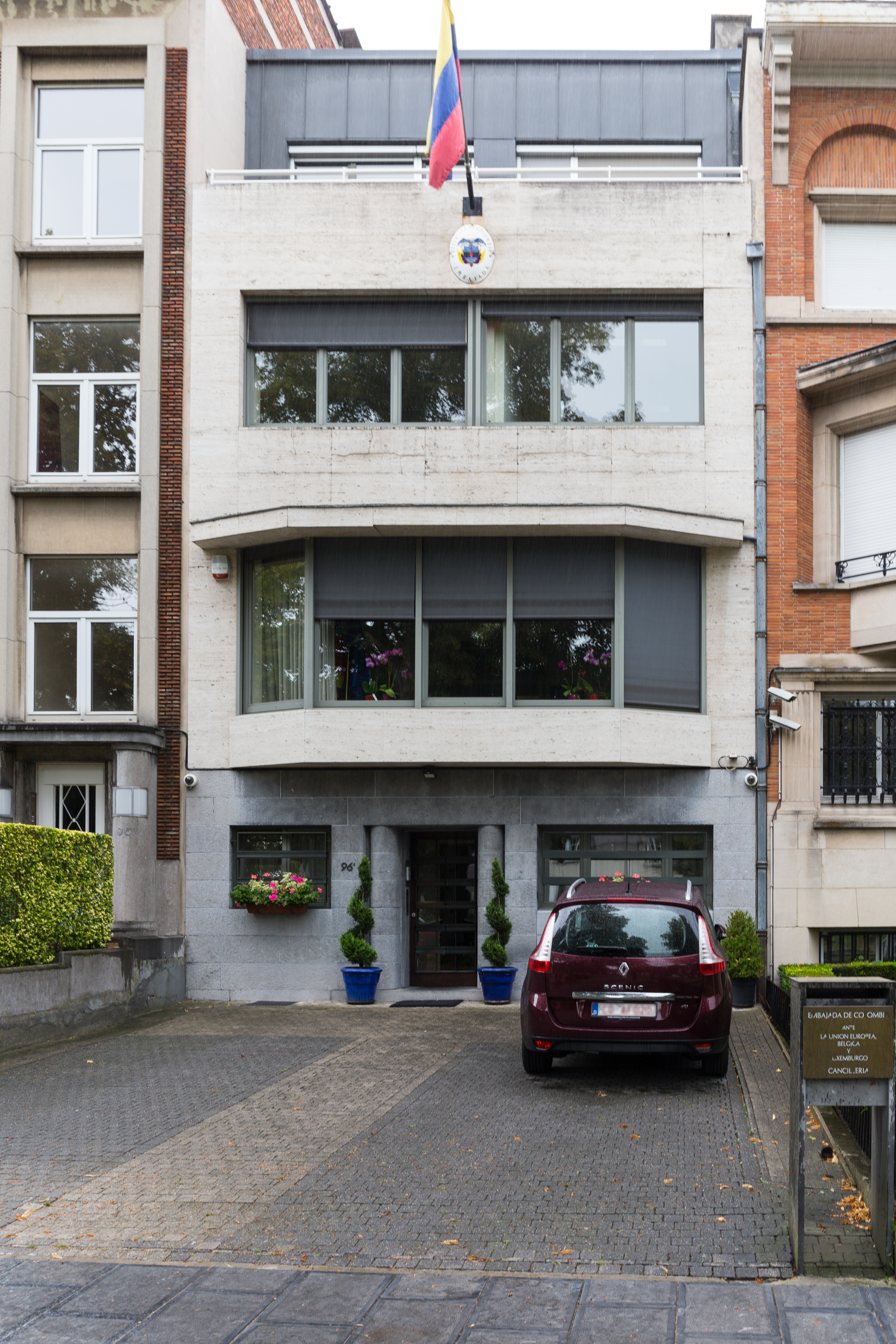
Embassy of Colombia

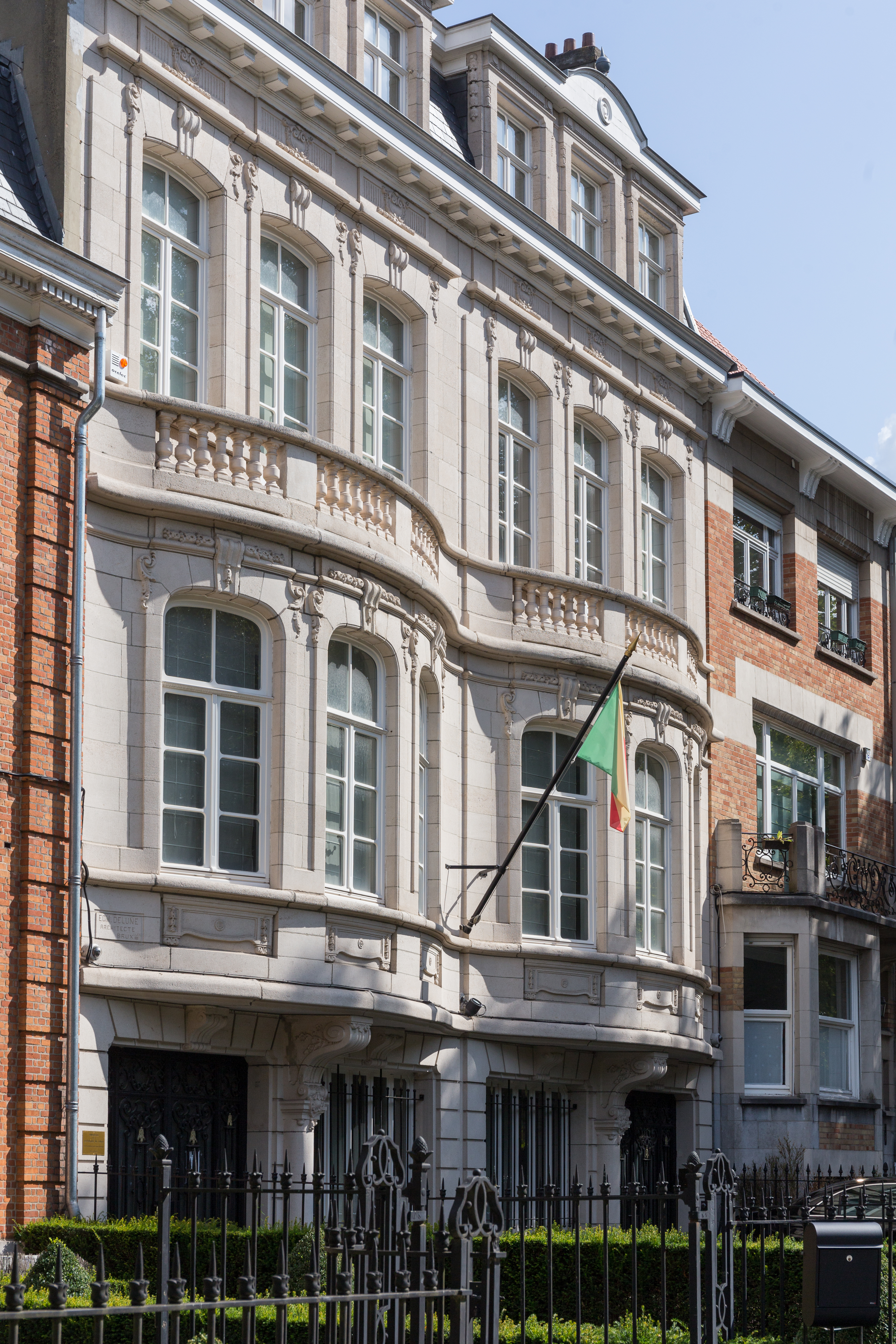
Embassy of Congo-Brazzaville

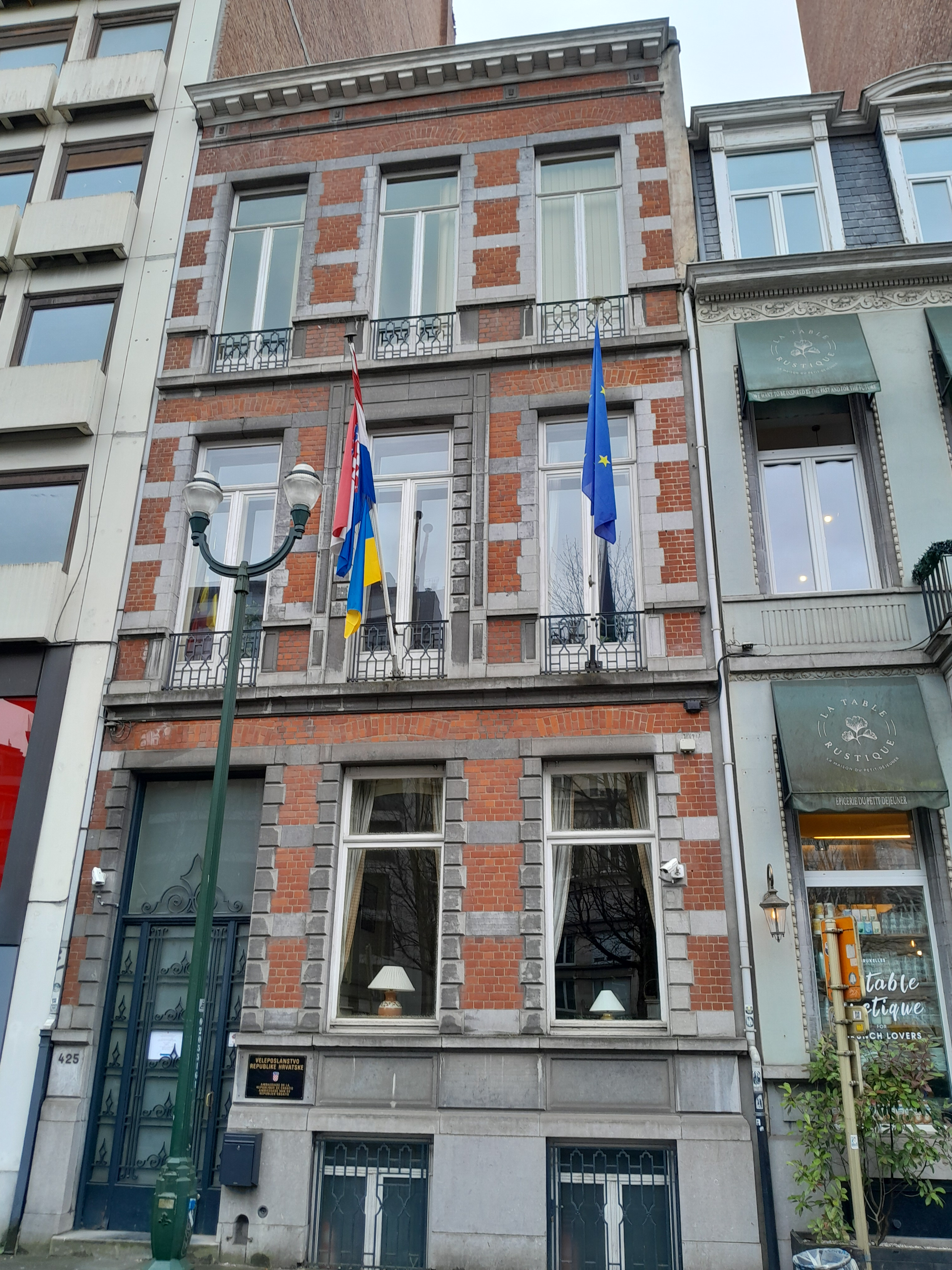
Embassy of Croatia

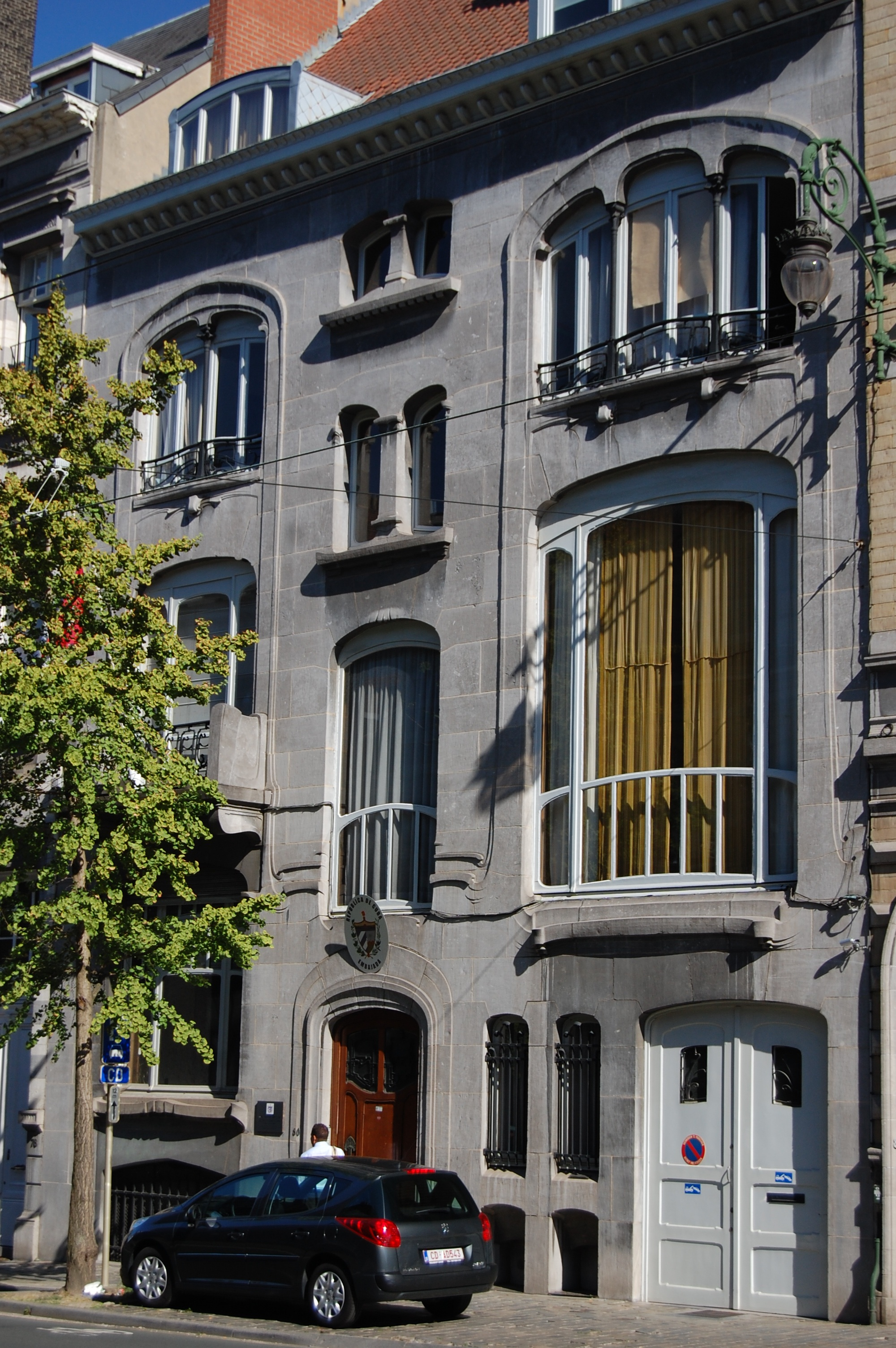
Embassy of Cuba

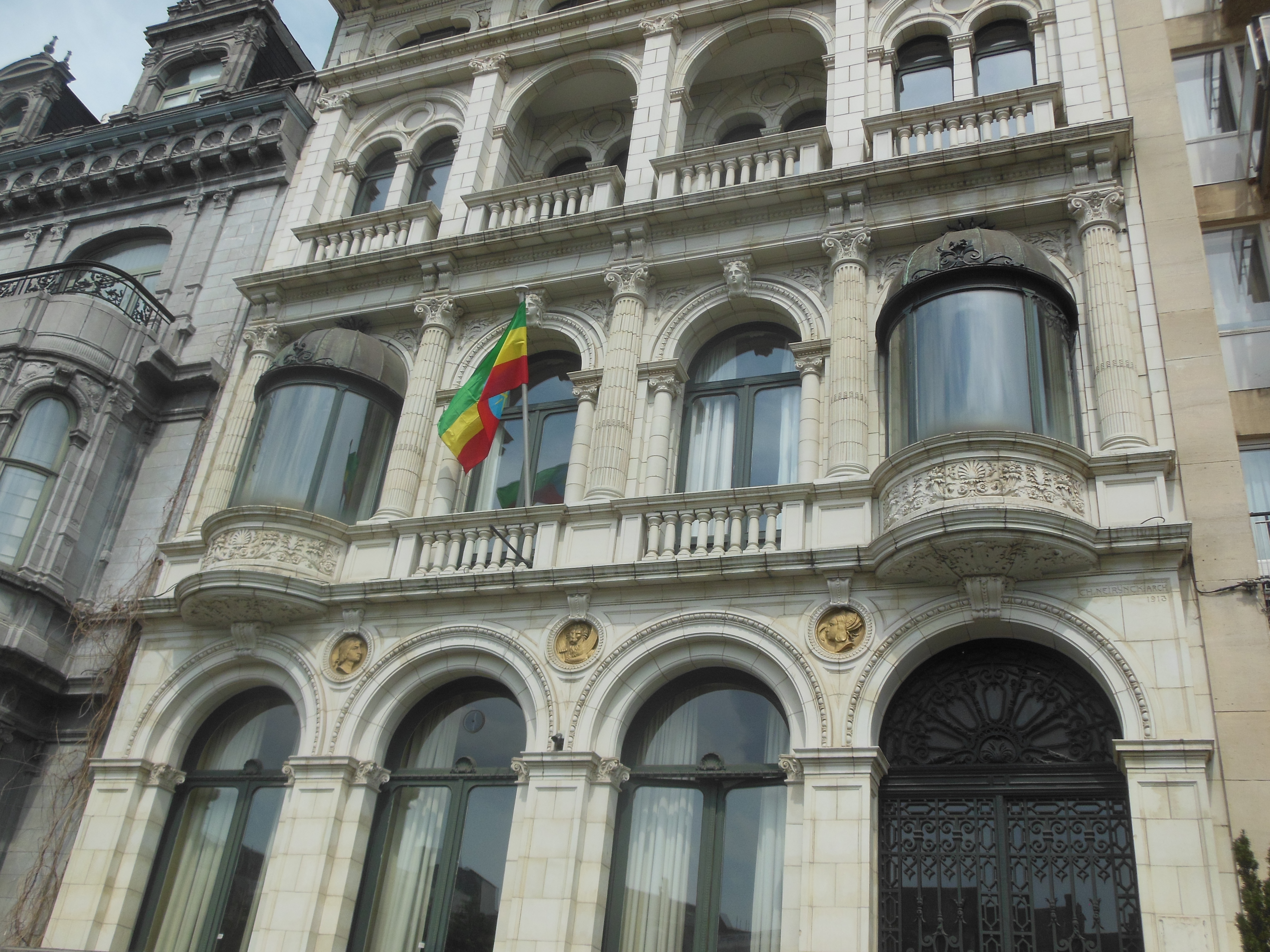
Embassy of Ethiopia

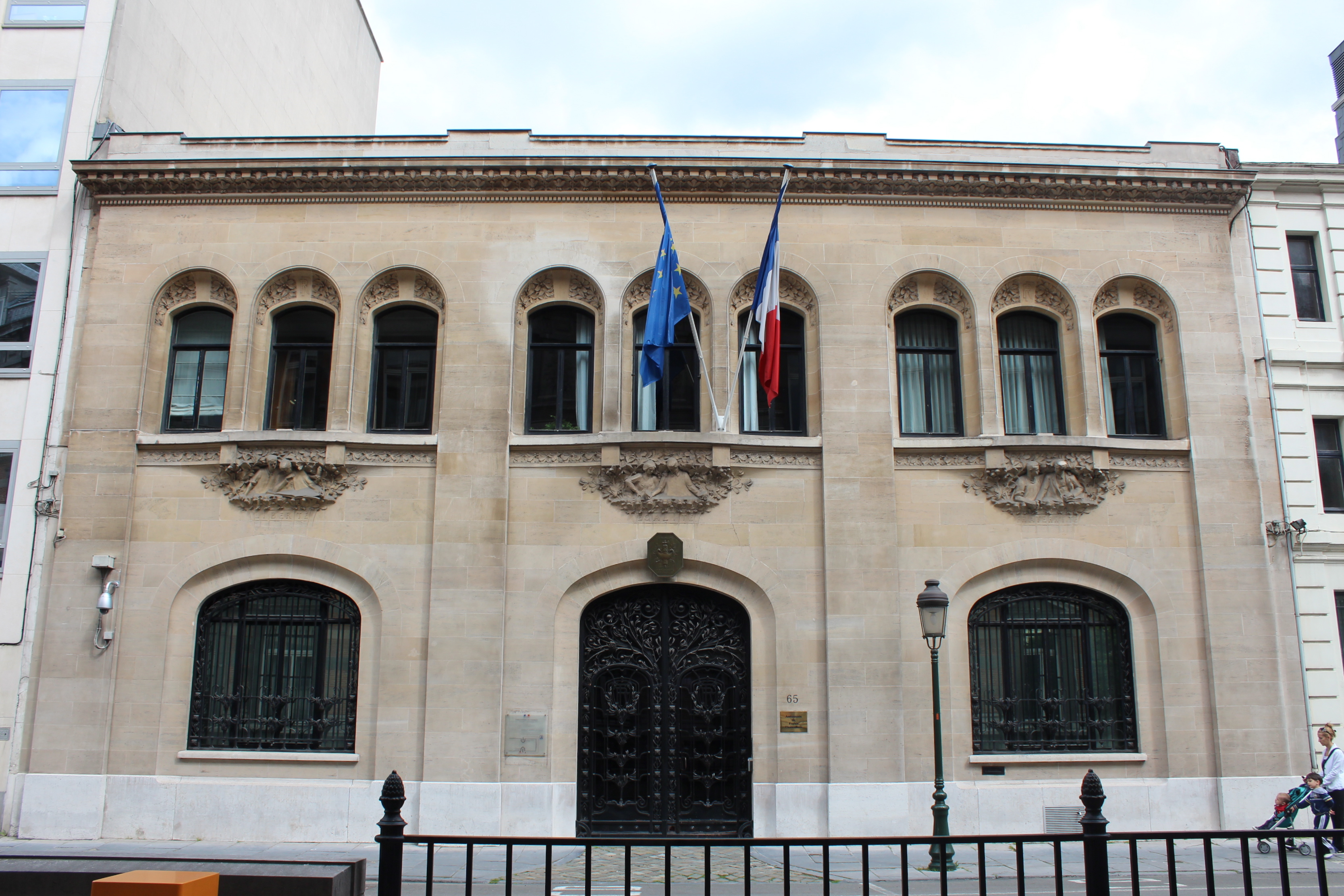
Embassy of France

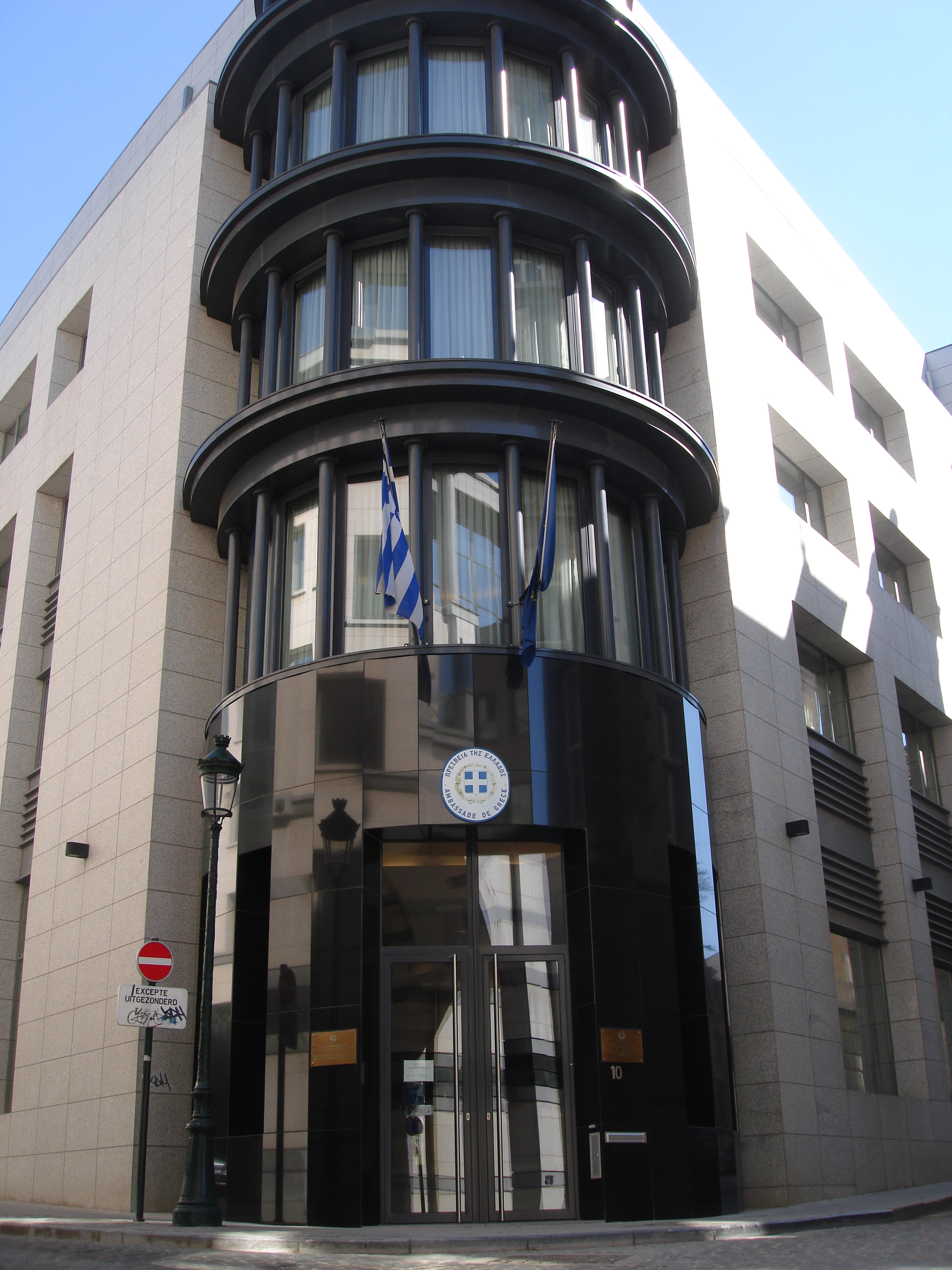
Embassy of Greece

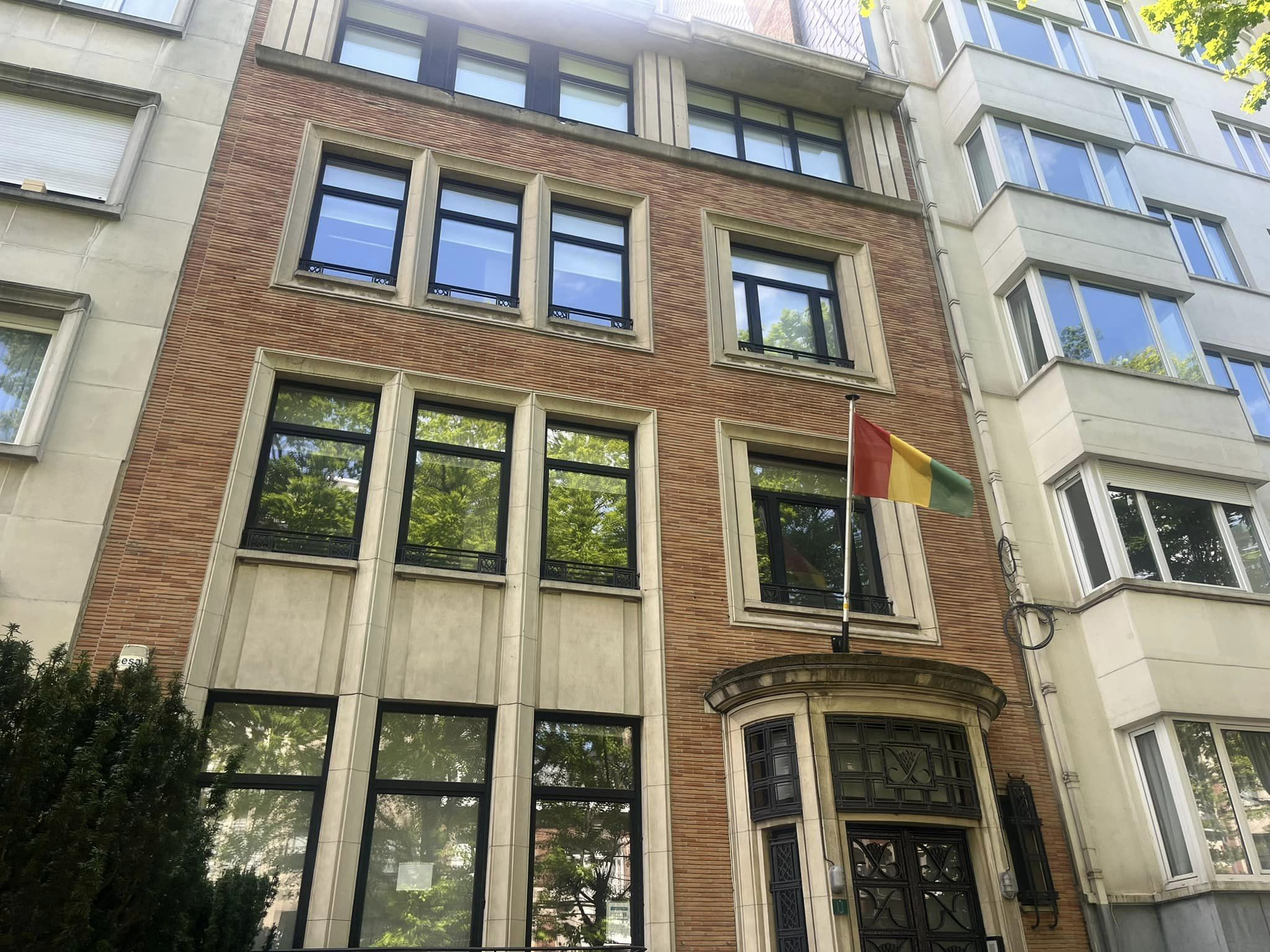
Embassy of Guinea

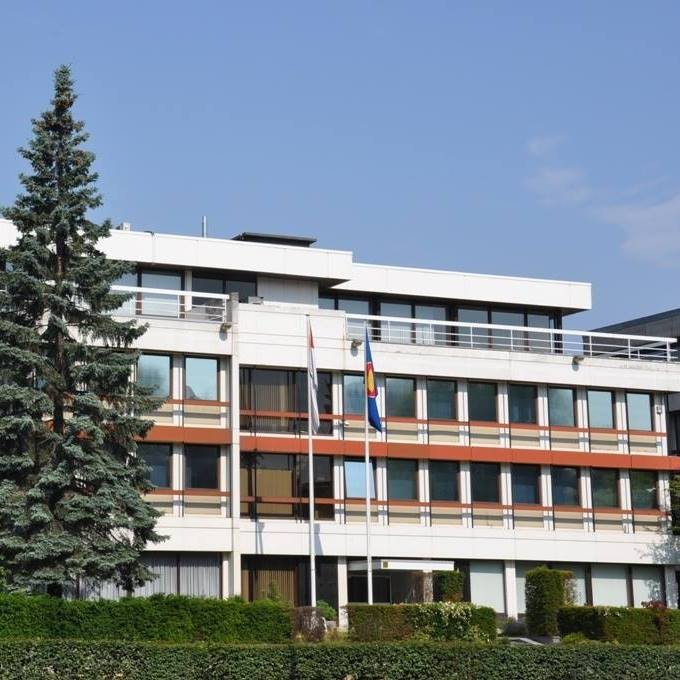
Embassy of Indonesia

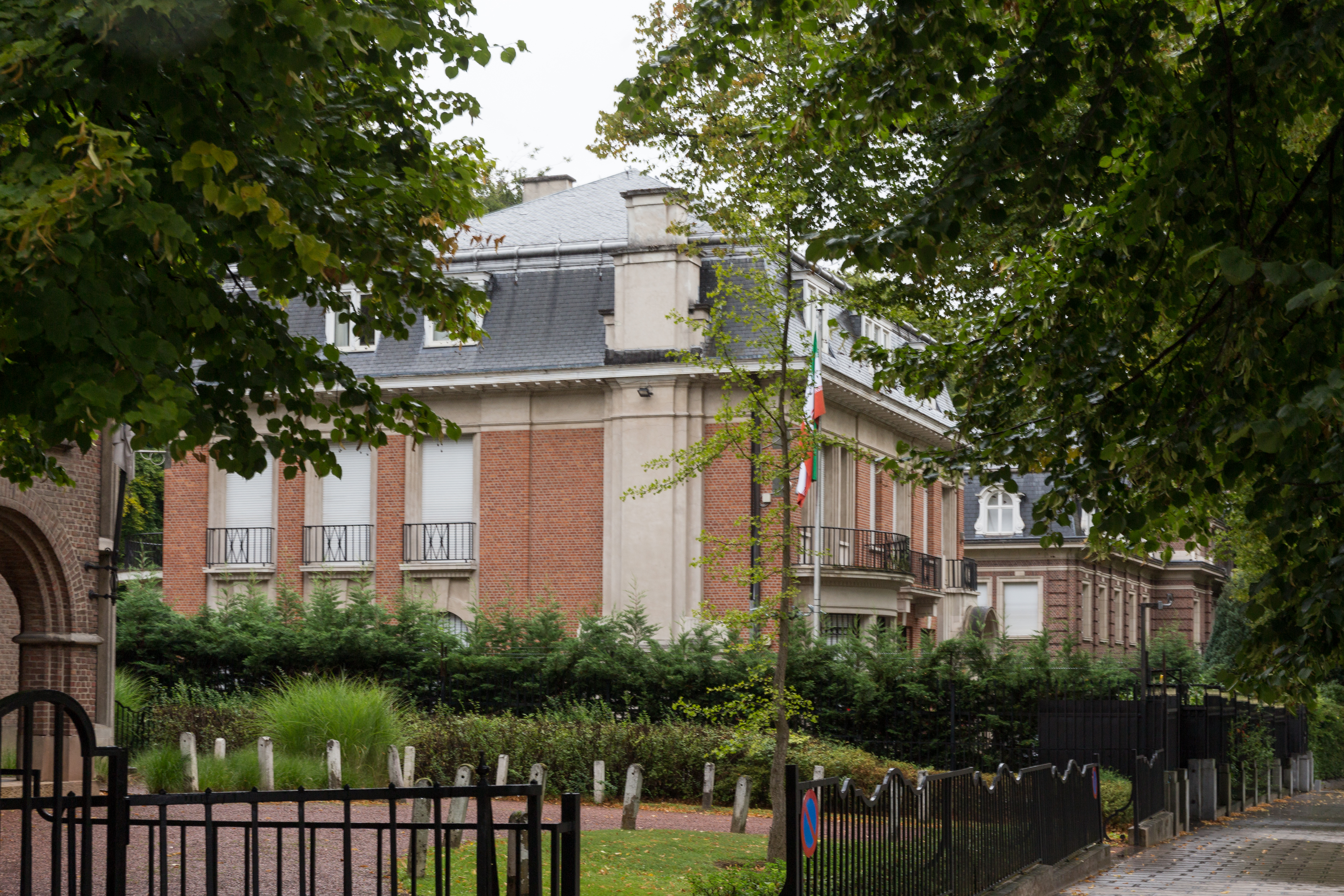
Embassy of Iran

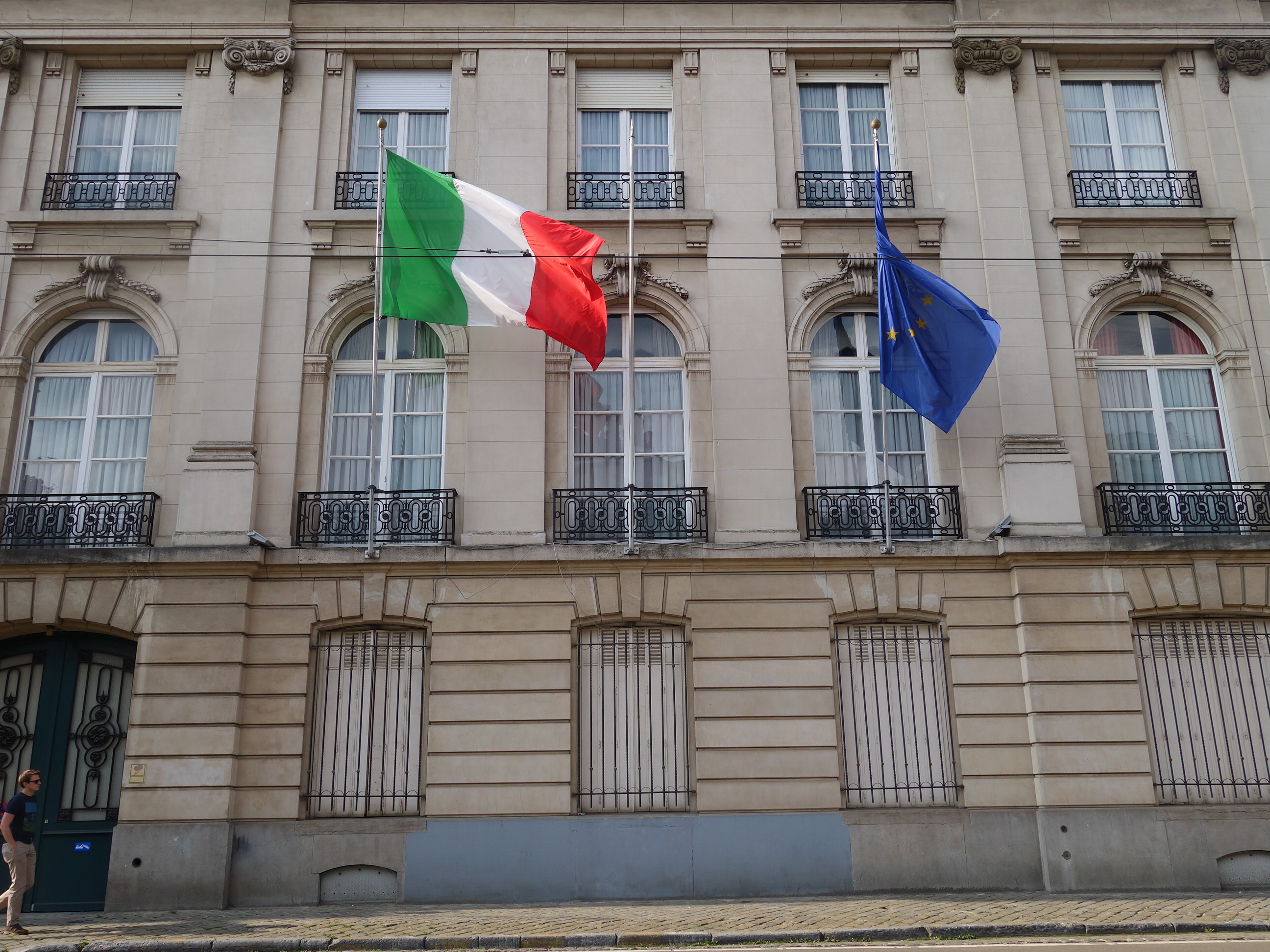
Embassy of Italy

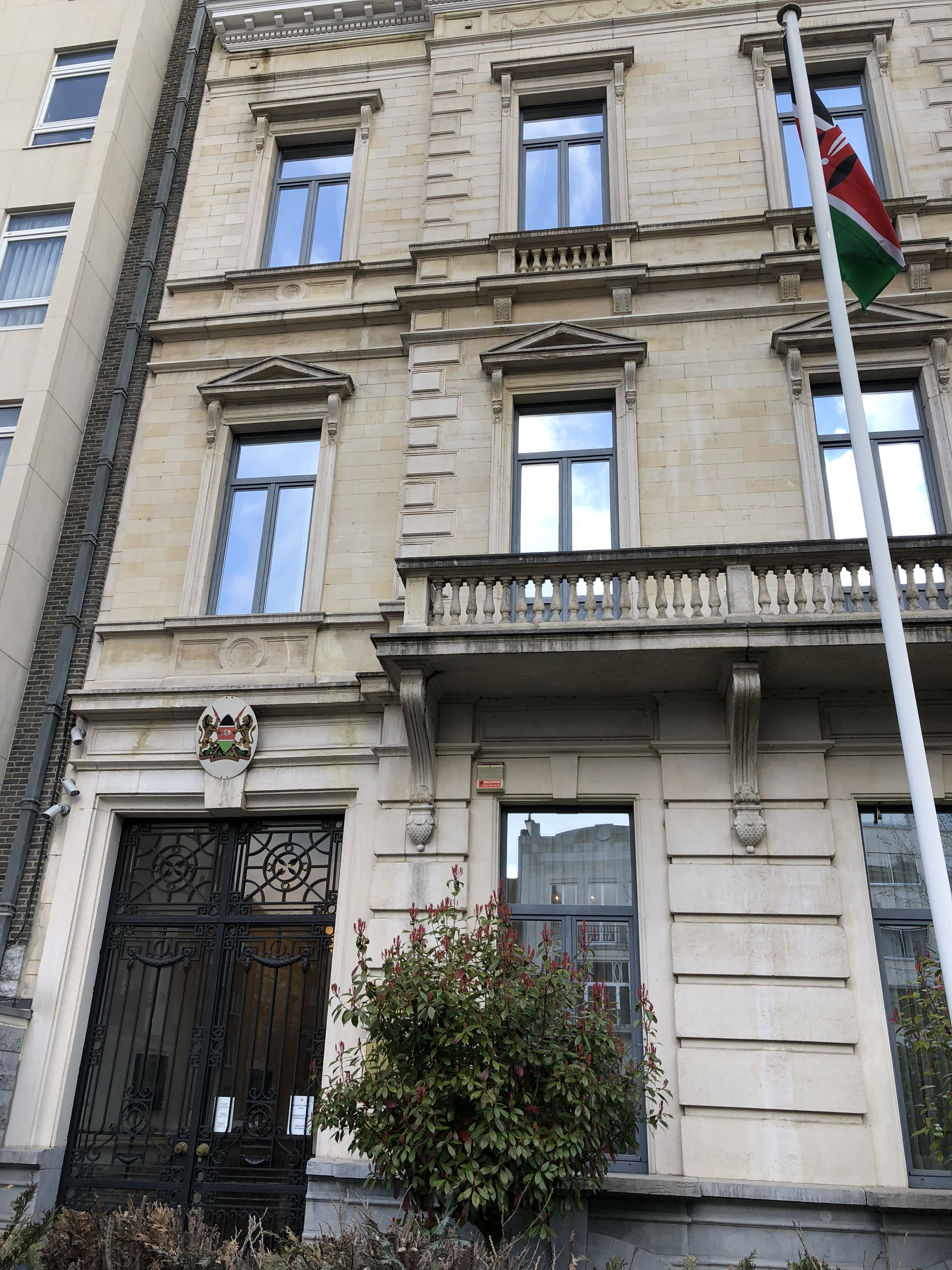
Embassy of Kenya

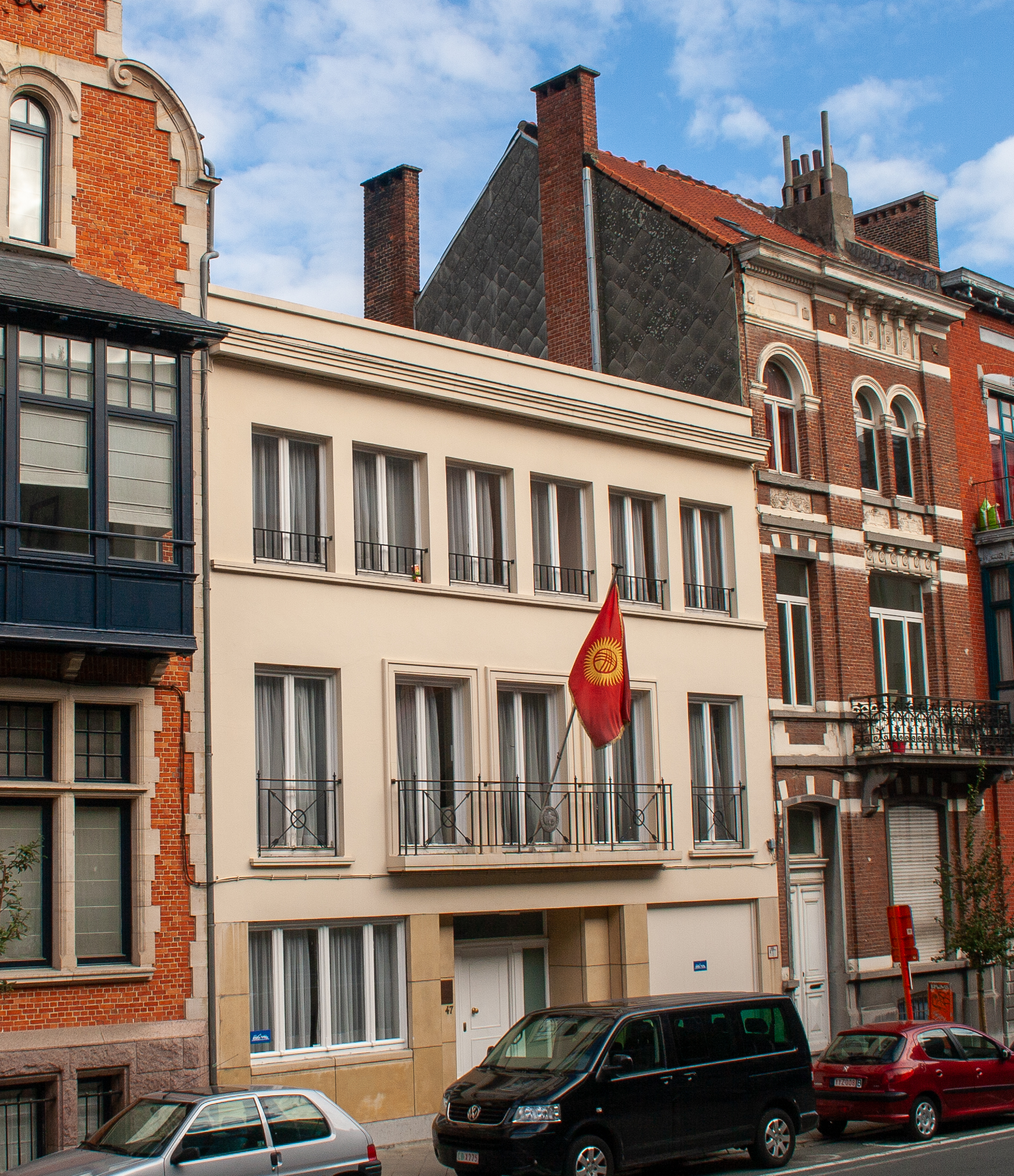
Embassy of Kyrgyzstan

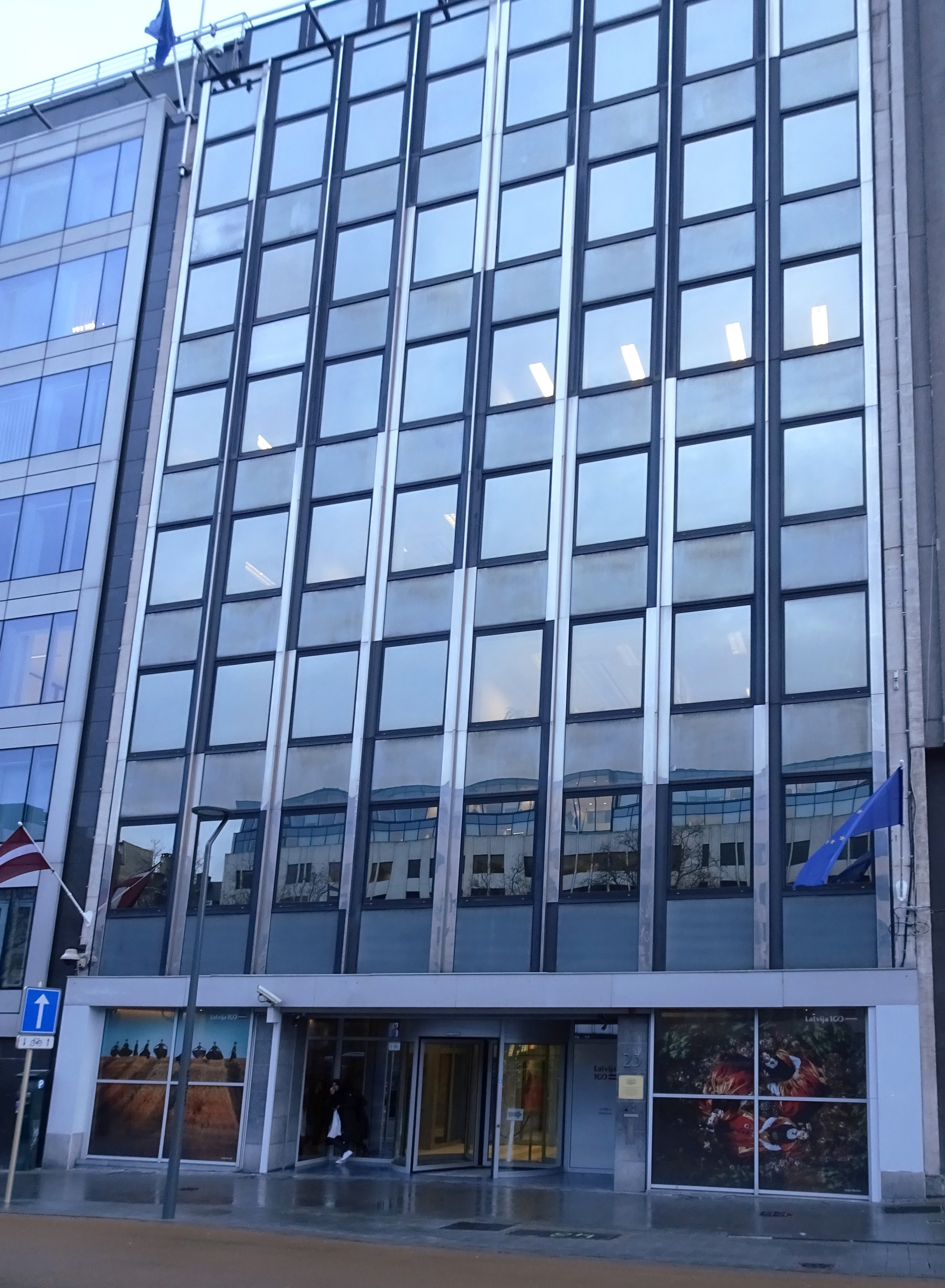
Embassy of Latvia

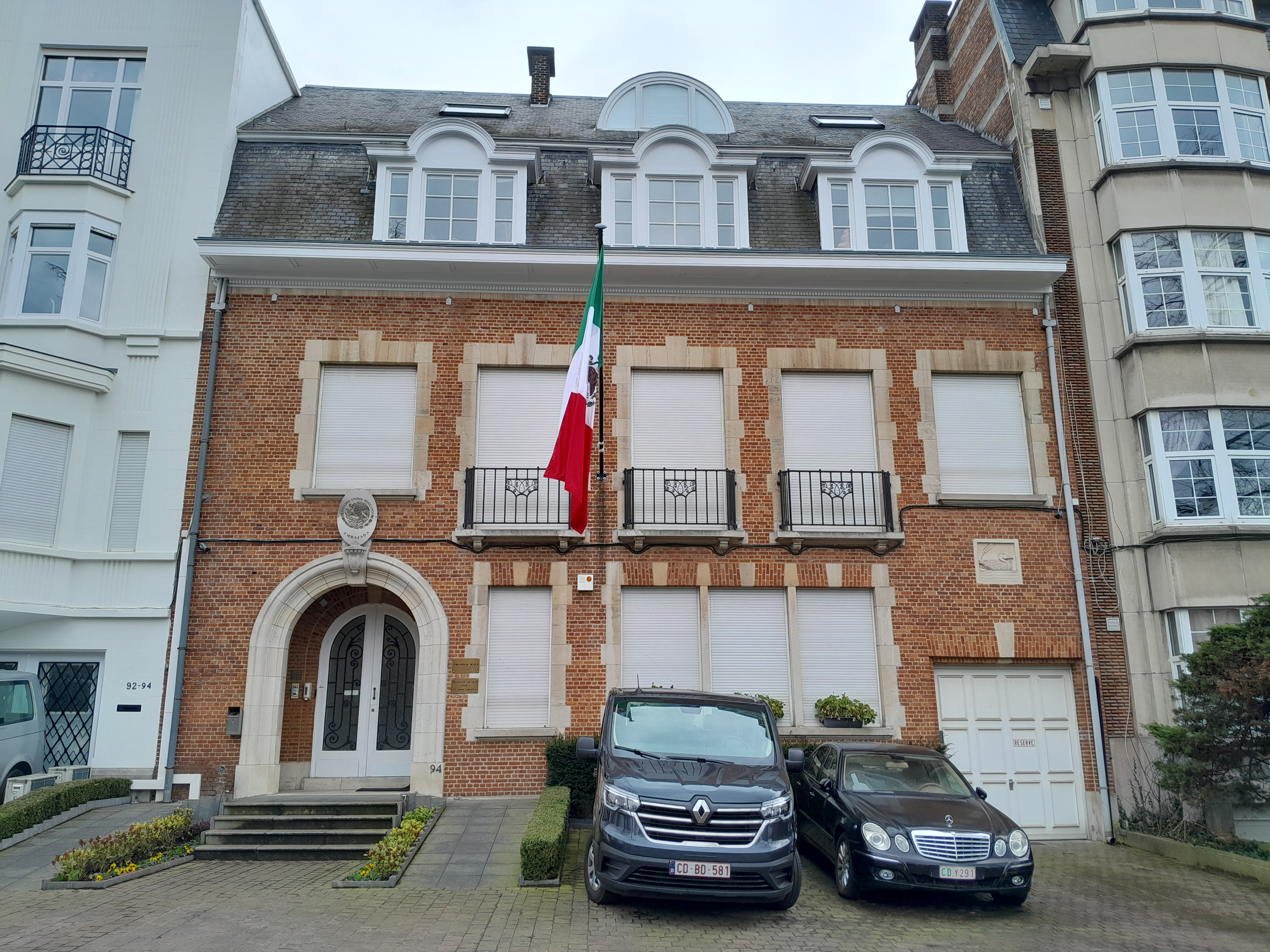
Embassy of Mexico

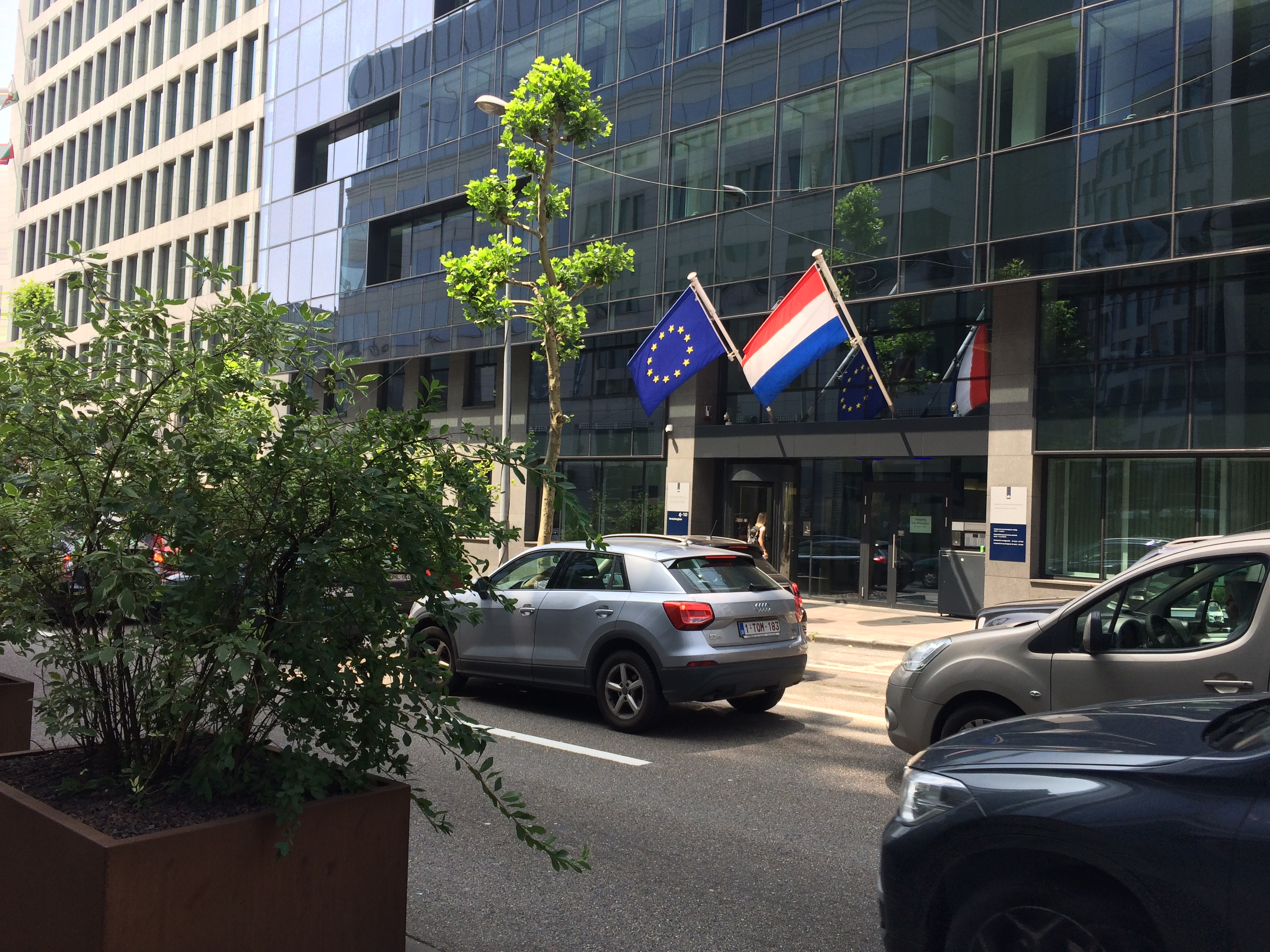
Embassy of the Netherlands

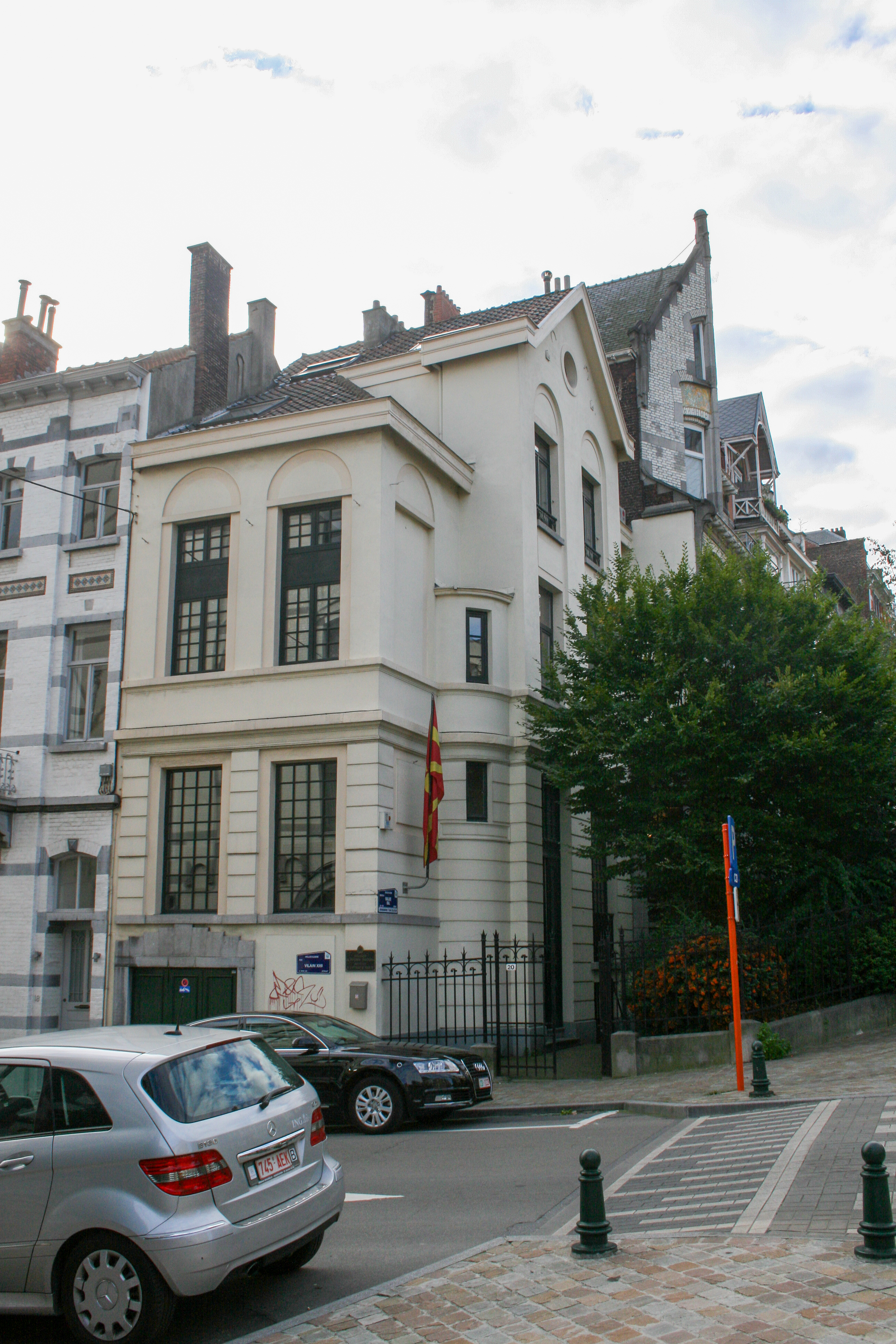
Embassy of North Macedonia

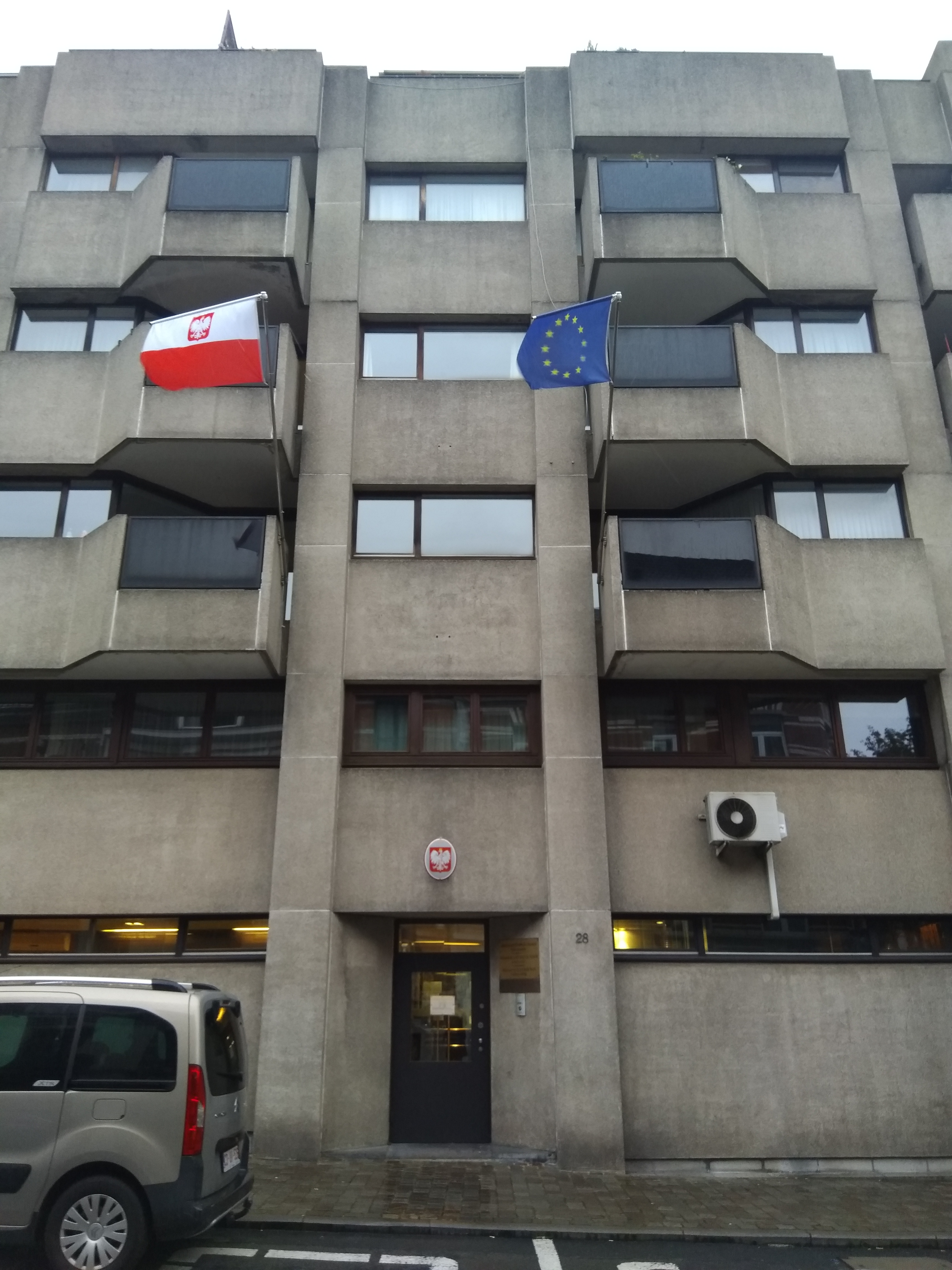
Embassy of Poland

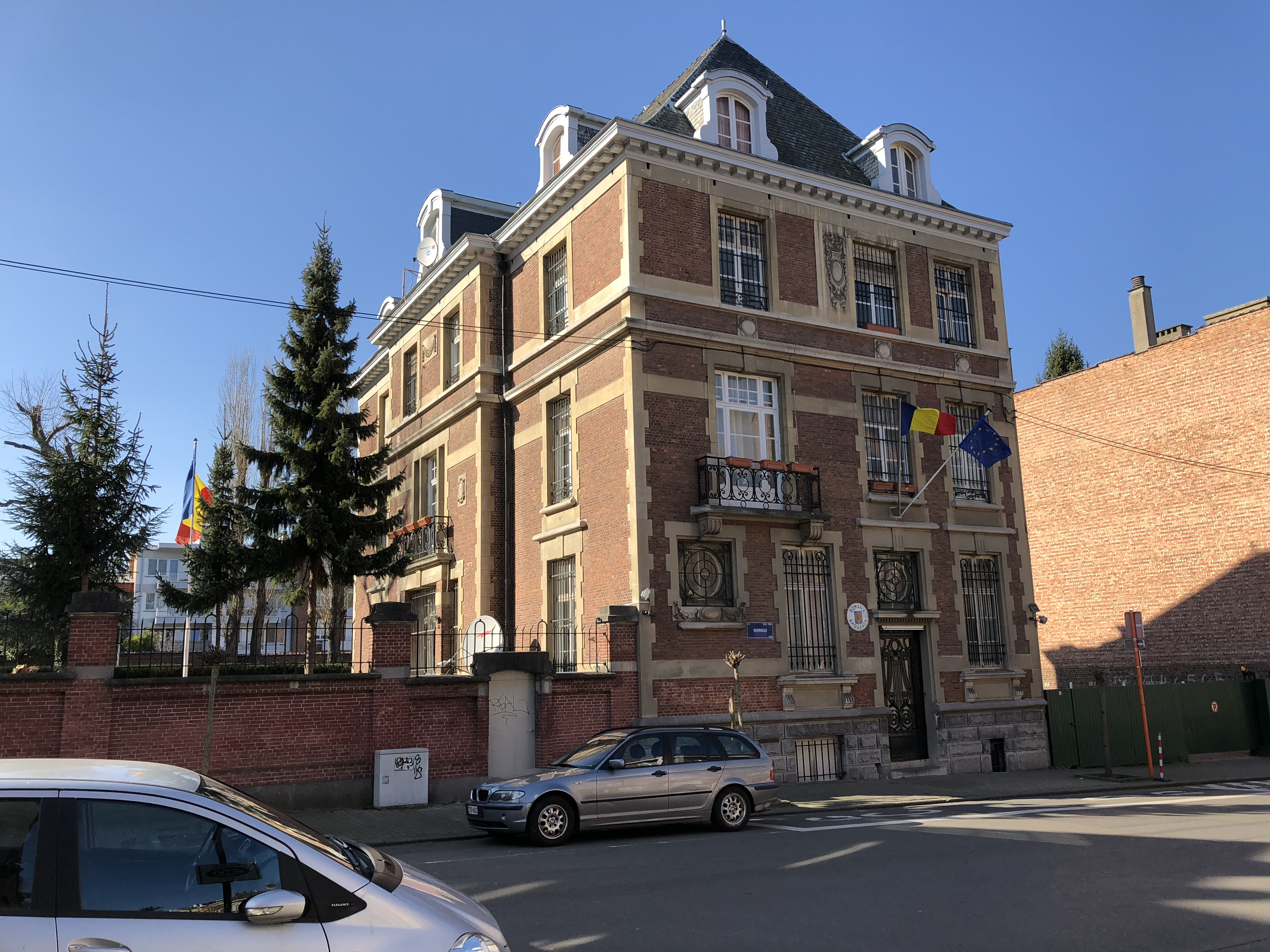
Embassy of Romania

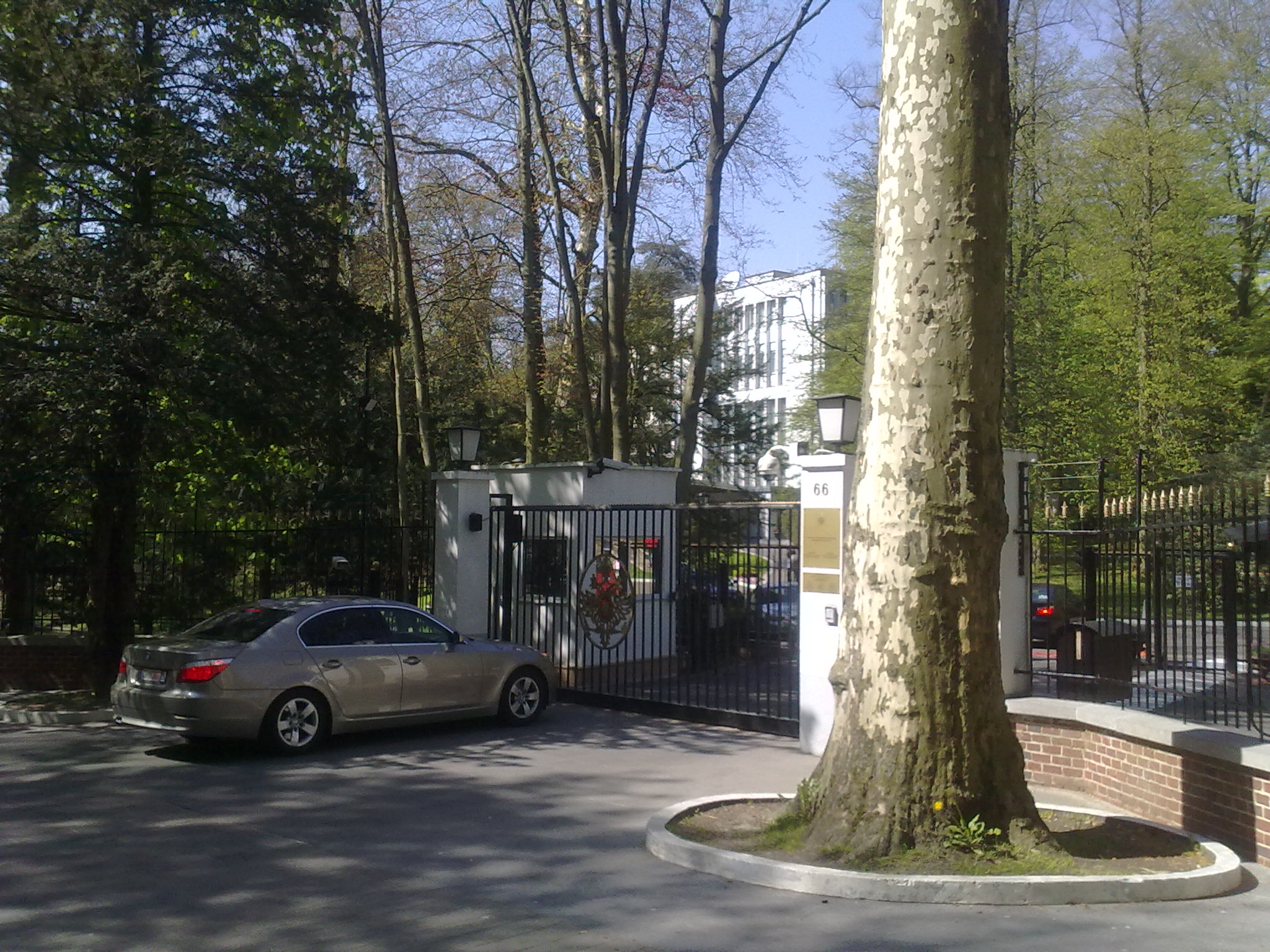
Embassy of Russia

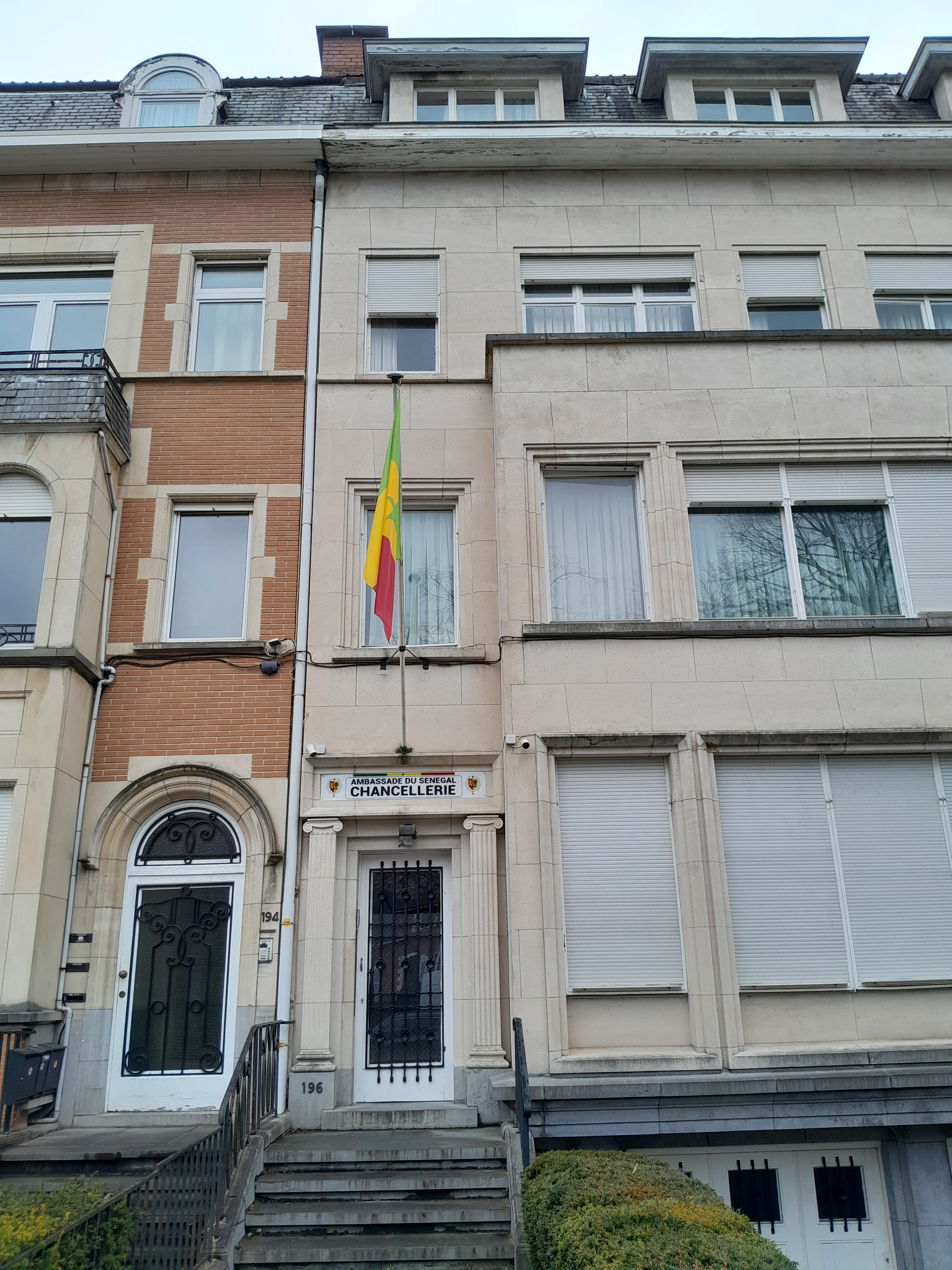
Embassy of Senegal

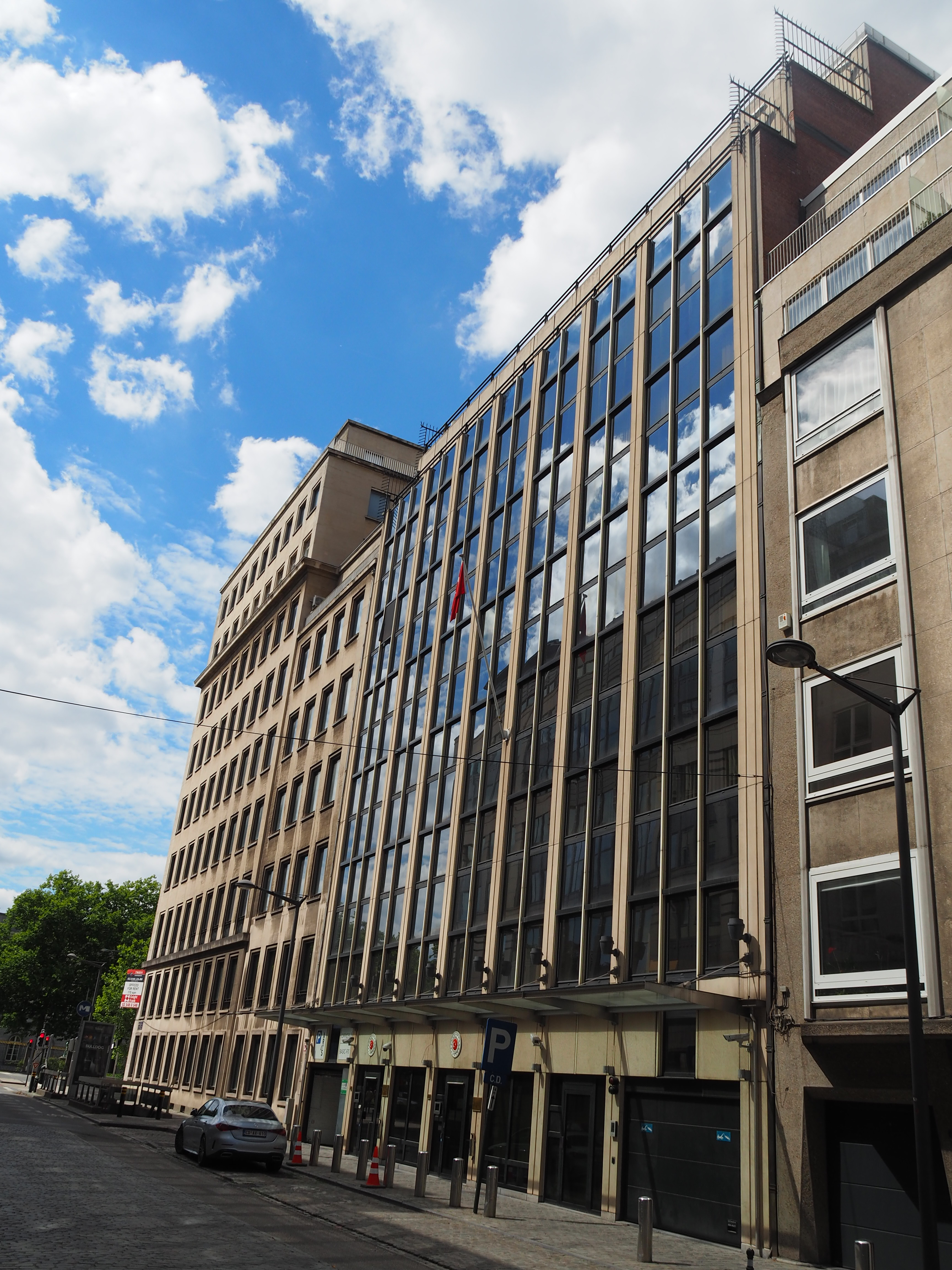
Embassy of Turkey

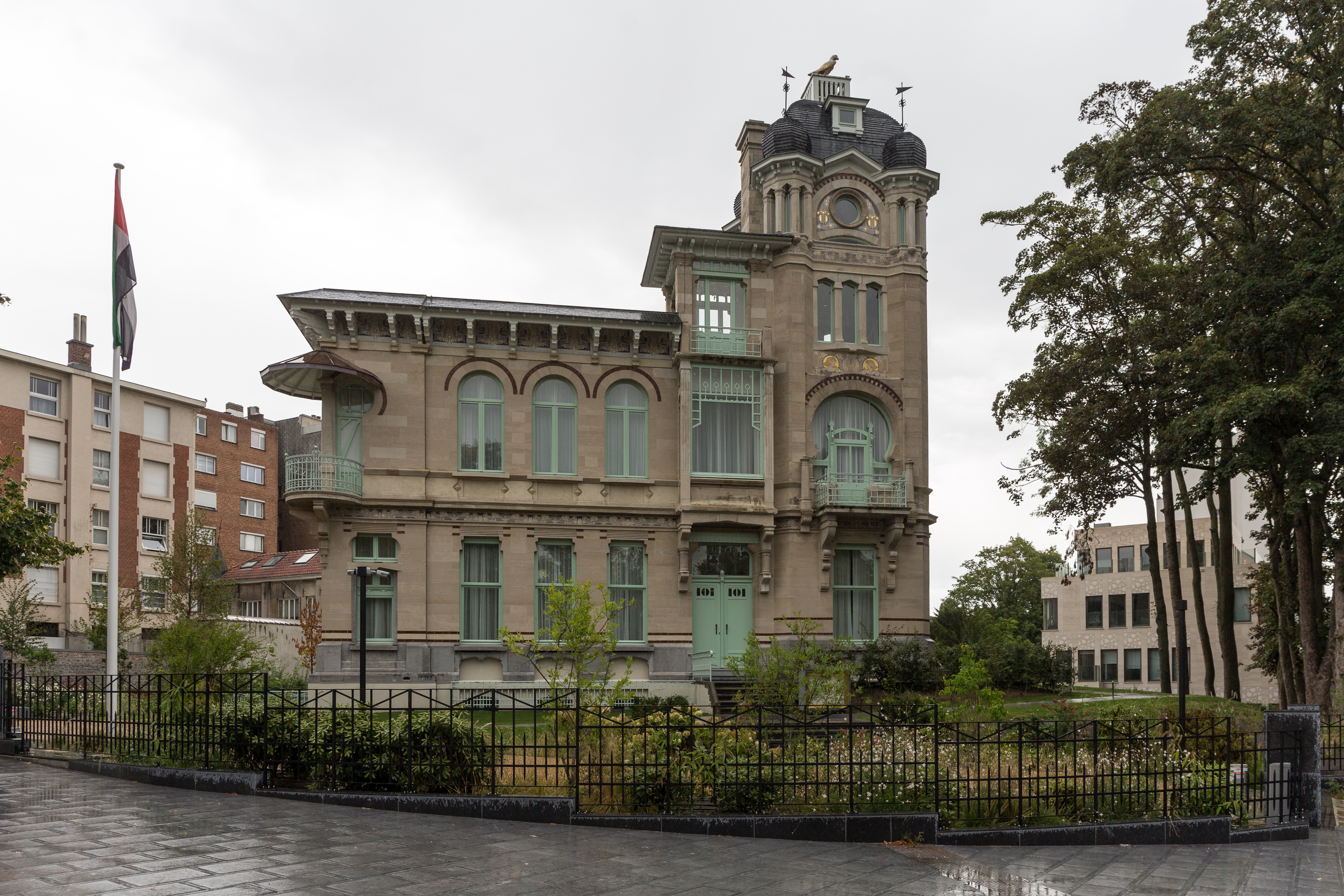
Embassy of the United Arab Emirates

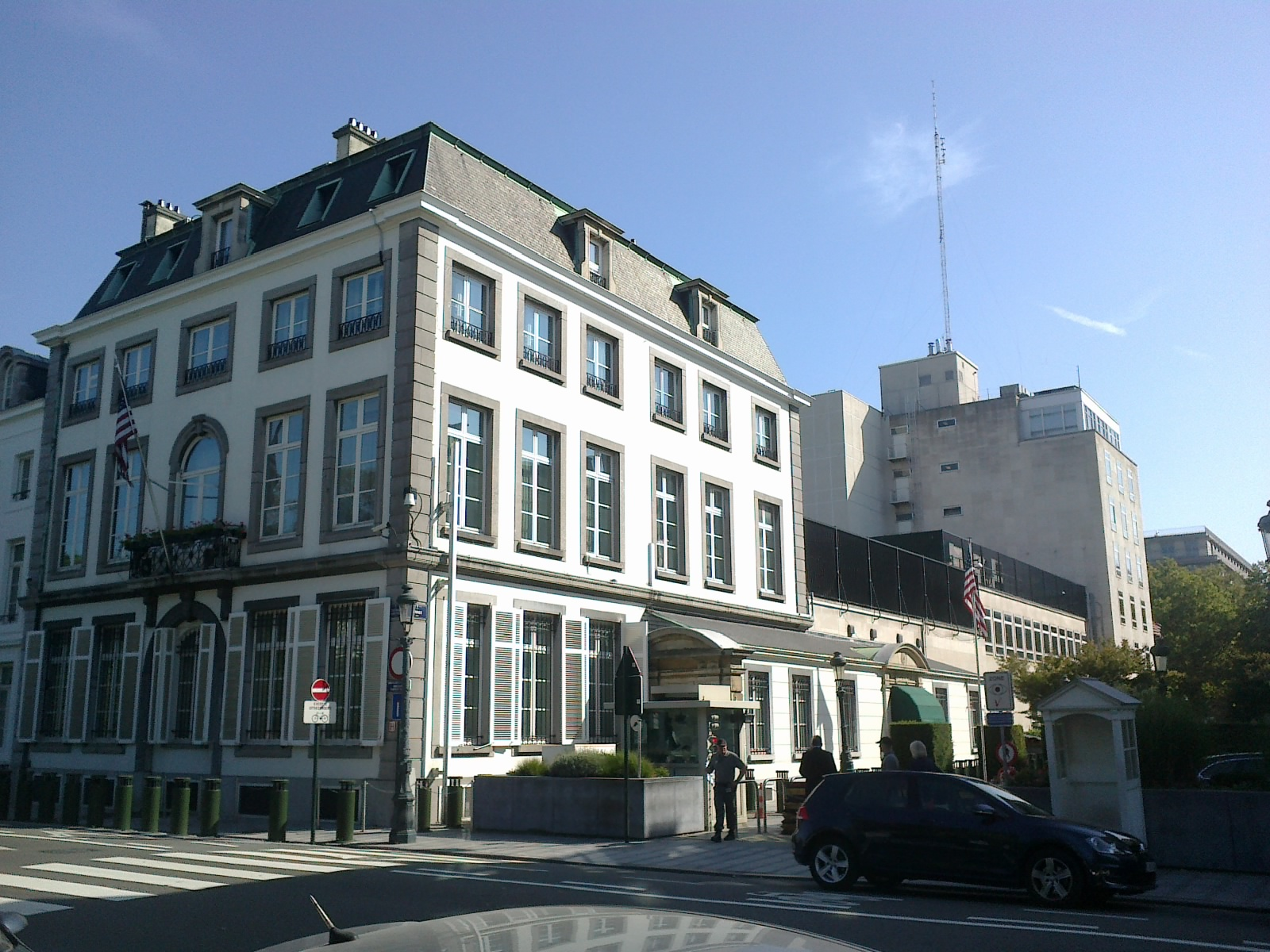
Embassy of the United States

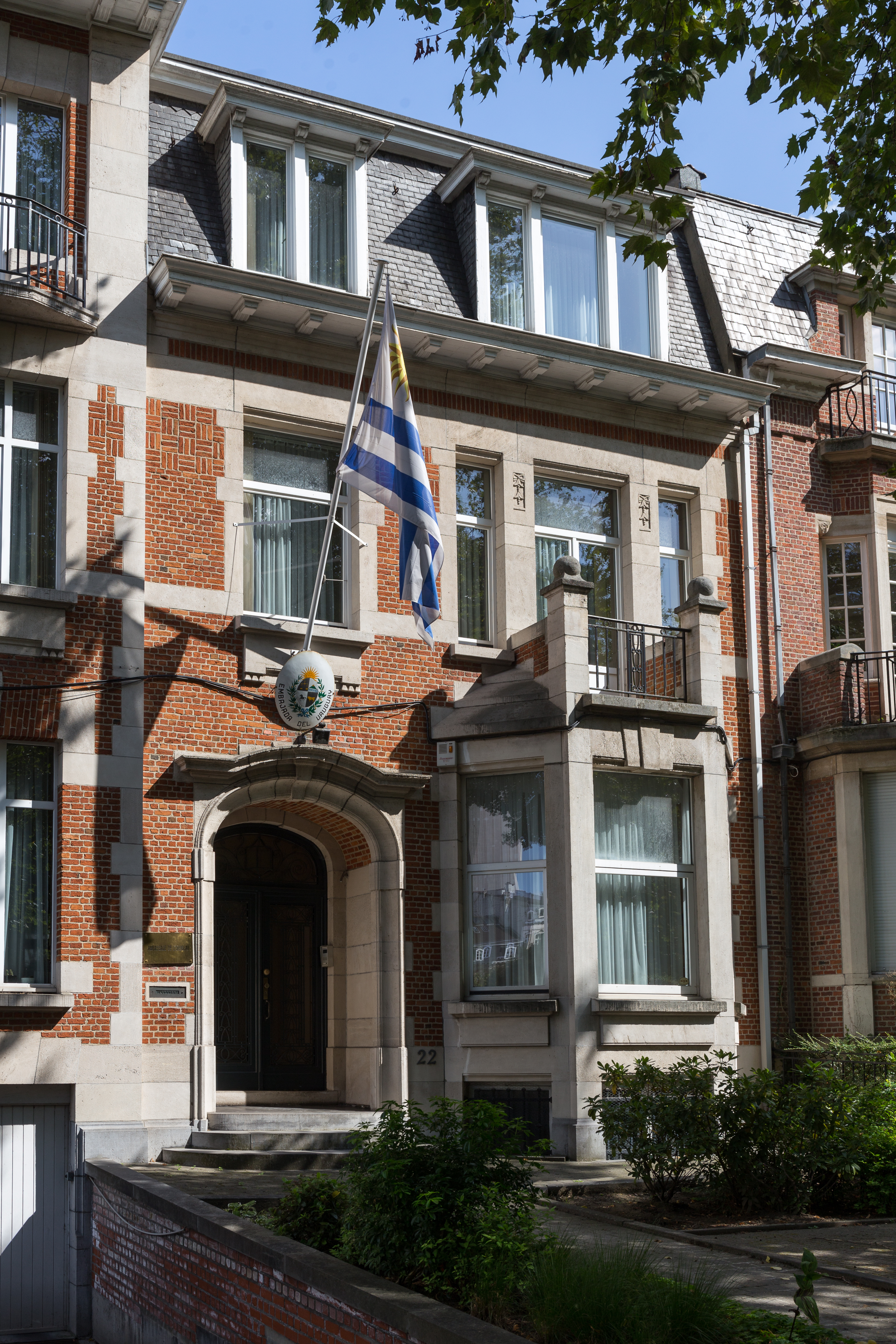
Embassy of Uruguay

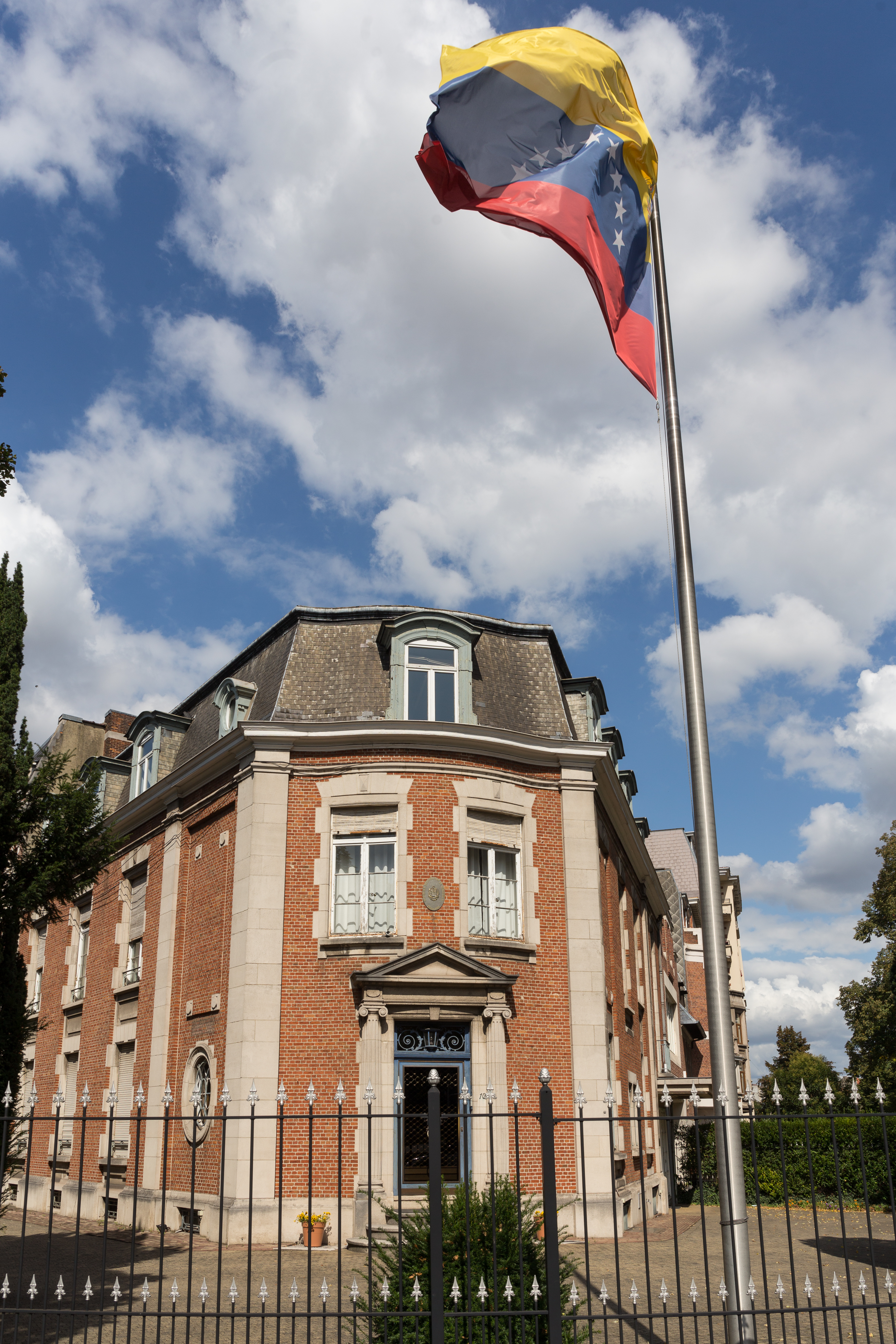
Embassy of Venezuela

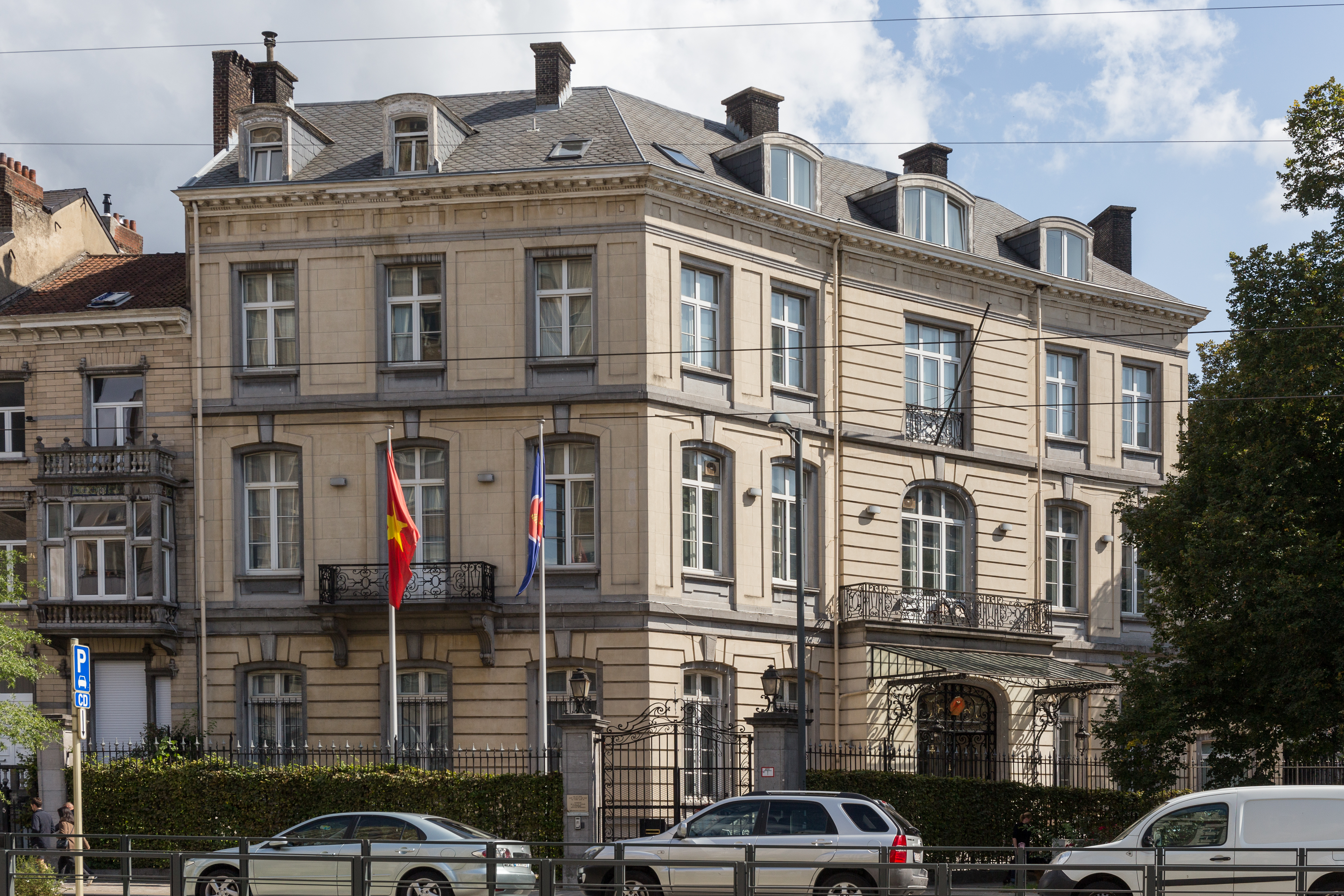
Embassy of Vietnam

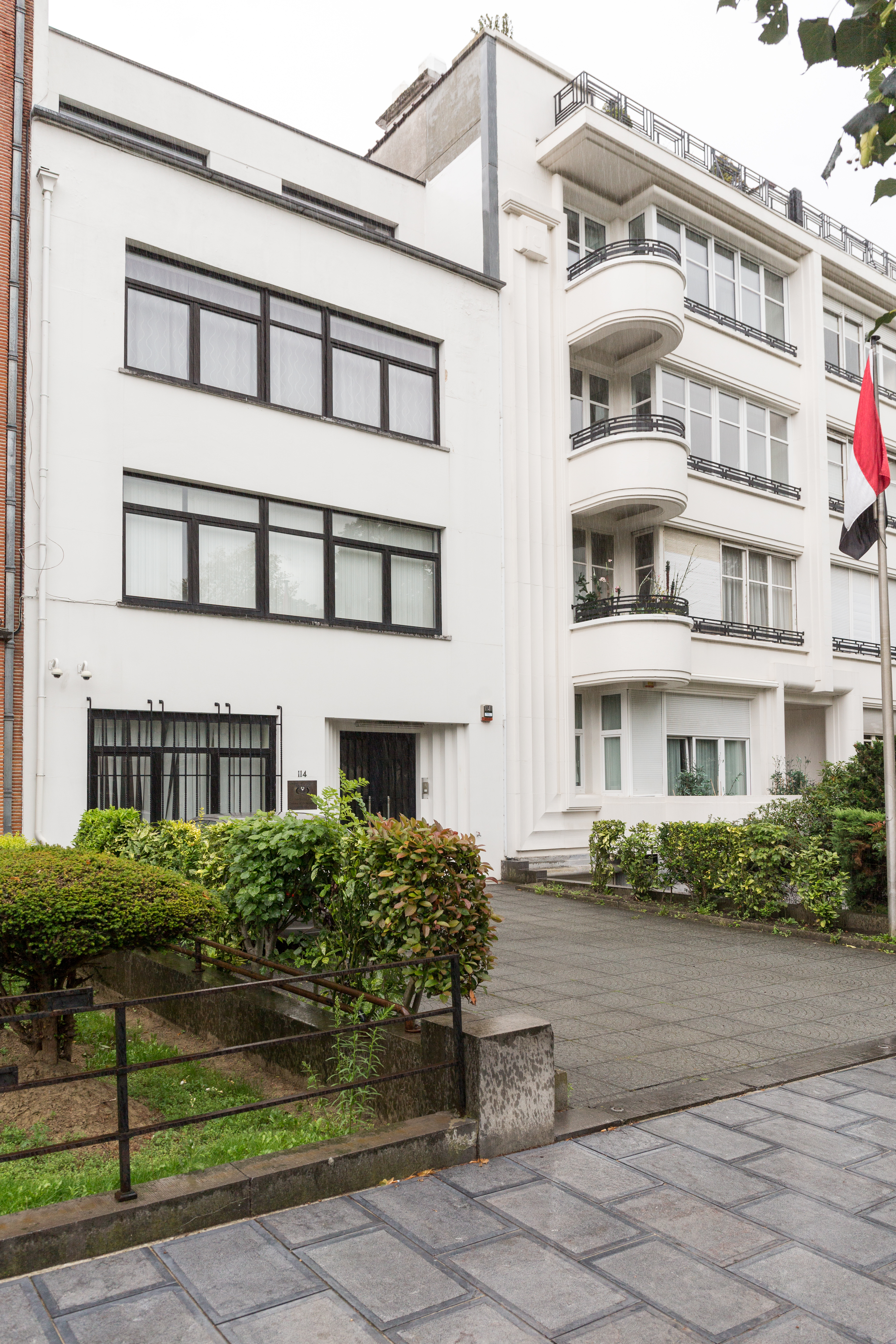
Embassy of Yemen

== Consulates General/Consulates ==
=== Antwerp ===
- Congo-Kinshasa
- Dominican Republic
- Morocco
- Netherlands
- Panama
- Russia
- Turkey

=== Charleroi ===
- Italy

=== Liège ===
- Morocco

== Non-resident embassies ==
=== Resident in New York City, United States ===
- Kiribati
- Nauru

=== Resident in Washington D.C., United States ===
- Marshall Islands
- Micronesia

=== Resident elsewhere ===
- Benin (Paris)
- Cook Islands (Avarua)
- Cyprus (The Hague)
- North Korea (Berlin)
- Tonga (London)

== Closed missions ==
Host city	Sending country	Mission	Year closed	Ref.
Brussels	Benin	Embassy	2020	
Brussels	Cyprus	Embassy	2016	
Brussels	Philippines	Mission to the European Communities	1985	
Brussels	Rwanda	Embassy	2025	
Brussels	South Korea	Mission to the European Union	1998	
Antwerp	France	Consulate-General	2011	
Antwerp	Poland	Consulate	2000	
Antwerp	Sweden	Consulate-General	1983	
Ghent	France	Consulate	1993	
Liége	France	Consulate-General	2011	
Liége	Italy	Consulate-General	2012	
Mons	France	Consulate-General	1993	
Mons	Italy	Vice-consulate	2013	
Namur	Italy	Consular agency	1998	

== See also ==
- Foreign relations of Belgium
- List of diplomatic missions of Belgium
- Visa requirements for Belgian citizens
