= International relations of Northern Ireland =

The Northern Ireland Executive, the devolved government of Northern Ireland, maintains relations with other governments and organisations overseas for social and economic purposes. Responsibility for external relations lies with the Executive Office of the First Minister and deputy First Minister of Northern Ireland.

== Representation in intergovernmental organisations ==
=== Northern Ireland Executive and Northern Ireland Assembly ===
Northern Ireland is represented within the following intergovernmental organisations:

- British-Irish Council
- British–Irish Parliamentary Assembly
- Commonwealth Parliamentary Association
- Congress of Local and Regional Authorities - Chamber of Regions
- EU–UK Parliamentary Partnership Assembly (observer)
- North/South Inter-Parliamentary Association
- North/South Ministerial Council

Within the United Kingdom, Northern Ireland is represented on the following bodies:

- East–West Council
- Prime Minister and Heads of Devolved Governments Council
- Council of the Nations and Regions
- Inter-Parliamentary Forum

=== Local authorities ===
Belfast and Derry City and Strabane are associate members or partners of Eurocities. Northern Irish local authorities nominate one delegate to the Chamber of Local Authorities of the Congress of Local and Regional Authorities.

== Missions ==
=== Representative offices of the Northern Ireland Executive ===
The Northern Ireland Executive maintains representative offices in Brussels, Beijing and Washington, D.C.

- Brussels – Belgium (Office of the Northern Ireland Executive in Brussels)
- Beijing – People's Republic of China (Northern Ireland Bureau, China)
- Washington, D.C. – United States (Northern Ireland Bureau, North America)

=== International Consular missions in Northern Ireland ===
Northern Ireland Hosts the following consular missions:

In Belfast

- China
- India
- Poland
- Timor-Leste
- United States

In Comber

- Saint Vincent and the Grenadines

== International sport ==
Northern Ireland is a member of the following international sports federations:

- Commonwealth Games Federation
- FIFA (UEFA)
- International Volleyball Federation (European Volleyball Confederation)
- World Darts Federation

Additionally, at some international sports events, athletes from Northern Ireland and the Republic of Ireland participate as part of a unified team representing the Island of Ireland.

== 2026 Cardiff memorandum of understanding ==
On 14 September 2026, Michelle O'Neil, Rhun ap Iorwerth, and John Swinney in their capacity as party leaders rather than heads of government, together with Sinn Féin president Mary Lou McDonald, signed a memorandum of understanding in Cardiff to affirm their shared commitment to independence from the United Kingdom and set out planned Welsh-Scottish cooperation on issues including child poverty, the cost of living, and international engagement, along with joint ambitions on the economy, energy and international partnerships.

== See also ==
- Foreign relations of the United Kingdom
- Membership of the countries of the United Kingdom in international organisations
- International relations of England
- International relations of Scotland
- International relations of Wales
