= Office of the Northern Ireland Executive in Brussels =

Representative mission

- Location: Brussels, Belgium
- Address: Chaussée d’Etterbeek 180
- Website: https://brusselsni.com/

The Office of the Northern Ireland Executive in Brussels is part of the Executive Office and is the focus of Northern Ireland's relations with the institutions of the European Union.

The Office of the Northern Ireland Executive, operates under the umbrella of the UK Permanent Representation to the European Union, as do the Brussels offices of the Scottish Government and Welsh Government.

== About ==
The Office of the Northern Ireland Executive in Brussels is located in the European Quarter of Brussels. The office provides full facilities for Northern Ireland Ministers and officials visiting the European Union institutions. The Office also co-operates with the Arts Council of Northern Ireland to present a programme showcasing Northern Ireland's culture in Brussels.

Northern Ireland-based organisations use the facilities to hold EU-related meetings and events. The Office also assists in raising awareness of the European Union in Northern Ireland and staff have developed a strong relationship with the European Commission representation in Belfast.

== Aims ==
- To assist the Northern Ireland Executive to further the aims of its Programme for Government through supporting Northern Ireland's engagement with the EU.
- To assist Northern Ireland Departments to contribute to EU policy development and implementation in relation to their core business areas and to increase Departmental engagement with elective European funding programmes.
- To raise the positive profile of Northern Ireland in the EU.

== See also ==
- Northern Ireland Executive
- First Minister and deputy First Minister
- Northern Ireland Bureau
- International relations of Northern Ireland
