= Alexandrov =

Alexandrov (masculine, also written Alexandrow) or Alexandrova (feminine) may refer to:

- Alexandrov (surname) (including Alexandrova), a Slavic last name
- Alexandrov, Vladimir Oblast, Russia
- Alexandrov (inhabited locality), several inhabited localities in Russia
- Alexandrova (horse) (foaled 2003), an Irish thoroughbred racehorse

== See also ==
- Alexandrovsk (disambiguation)
