= B40 =

B40, B-40, or B.40 may refer to:

== Roads ==
- Autovia B-40, a Spanish motorway in Catalonia
- Bundesstraße 40, a German road

== In Science ==
- Borospherene, B_{40}, an allotropic cage-like molecule of pure boron
- HLA-B40, an HLA-B serotype

== Military ==
- Vietnamese designation of the RPG-2, the first rocket-propelled grenade launcher designed in the Soviet Union
- BSA B40, a 350cc British motorcycle
- Blackburn B.40, an experimental Blackburn flying boat
- Rolls-Royce B40 Engine, an inline-four petrol engine primarily used in the Austin Champ
- Unterseeboot B-40, World War I Imperial Germany Navy submarine U-boat
- YB-40 Flying Fortress, an aircraft

== Other ==
- 40 amp, type B – a standard circuit breaker current rating
- B40 Balkan Cities Network, an intercity organization between Balkans cities
- Sicilian Defence, Encyclopaedia of Chess Openings code
