= Alexandrov (surname) =

Alexandrov or Aleksandrov, Alexandroff, Aleksandrow (Bulgarian: Александров; Russian: Александров; masculine) or Alexandrova/Aleksandrova (feminine) is a Slavic surname derived from the name Alexander and common in Bulgaria and Russia. It is shared by the following people:

== Science and mathematics ==
- Aleksandr Danilovich Aleksandrov (1912–1999), Russian mathematician, physicist, philosopher and mountaineer
- Anastassia Alexandrova, Russian-American chemist
- Anatoly Petrovich Alexandrov (1903–1994), Soviet/Russian physicist and academician
- Ivan Alexandrov (1875–1936), Soviet engineer and academician
- Pavel Alexandrov (1896–1982), Russian mathematician who introduced the Alexandrov topology
- Vladimir Alexandrov, Soviet physicist

== Military, government, and exploration ==
- Aleksandr Panayotov Aleksandrov (born 1951), Bulgarian cosmonaut
- Aleksandr Pavlovich Aleksandrov (born 1943), Russian cosmonaut
- Todor Aleksandrov (1881–1924), Bulgarian revolutionary

== Arts, music, and drama ==
- Mihail Aleksandrov (1949 ~), Lithuanian-born painter who specializes in oil painting, watercolor and tempura.
- Sasha Alexandrov (1980 ~), Croatian fashion and glamour photographer specialized in nudes and fetish photography.
- Alexander Vasilyevich Alexandrov (1883–1946), Russian composer who wrote the musical score to the National Anthem of the Soviet Union
- Anatoly Nikolayevich Alexandrov (1888–1982), Soviet composer and People's Artist of the USSR
- Boris Alexandrovich Alexandrov (1905–1994), Conductor of Alexandrov Ensemble, composer, People's Artist of the USSR, and Hero of Socialist Labor
- Constantin Alexandrov (1940), French actor, producer, and movie maker
- Grigory Alexandrov (1903–1983), Soviet film director and script writer
- Josip Murn Aleksandrov (1879–1901), Slovenian poet
- Nikolay Grigoryevich Alexandrov (1870–1930), Russian actor, founding member of MKhAT
- Vladimir Alexandrov (critic) (1898–1954), Soviet literary critic
- Gina Alexandrov (Architect) (1975 ~), Architect and Designer specializing in mid-century modern renovations.

== Other people ==
- Aleksandar Aleksandrov (born 1975), Bulgarian footballer
- Aleksandar Aleksandrov (born 1986), Bulgarian footballer
- Aleksej Aleksandrov (born 1973), Belarusian chess grandmaster
- Alexander Petrovich Alexandrov (1906-?), Soviet engineer and twice Hero of Socialist Labor
- Ekaterina Alexandrova (born 1994), Russian tennis player
- Evgeny Alexandrov (born 1982), Russian ice hockey player
- Georgy Aleksandrov (1908–1961), Soviet philosopher and culture minister
- Igor A Aleksandrov (1956–2001), Ukrainian journalist
- Mihail Aleksandrov, (born 1989), Bulgarian footballer
- Nikita Alexandrov (born 2000), Russian ice hockey player
- Pavel Alexandrovich Alexandrov (1866–1940), Lawyer of the Russian Empire, the prosecutor, State Councillor
- Stoyan Alexandrov, Bulgarian economist
- Teodora Alexandrova (born 1981), Bulgarian rhythmic gymnast
- Vera Aleksandrova (1895–1966), Russian literary critic, historian, and editor
- Yuri Alexandrov, multiple people
