= International relations of Bratislava =

Bratislava signed its first town twinning agreement with Perugia in 1962. Beside some of the towns mentioned below, the city later signed partnership agreements with Ho Chi Minh City, Alexandria, Thessaloniki, Larnaca, Rousse, Székesfehérvár and Yerevan.

After political changes at the end of the 1980s, some of the partnerships declined or were stopped, but on the other hand, new partnerships emerged as the result, and the city signed agreements with Graz, Vienna, Karlsruhe, Ulm, Regensburg, Prague, Ostrava, Budapest, Namur, Jerusalem and many other cities. Bratislava also participates in international organizations such as the Union of the Capitals of the European Union, Eurocities, and the Strasbourg Club.

- (United States) Cleveland, USA
- Kyiv, Ukraine
- Kraków, Poland

- Ljubljana, Slovenia
- Perugia, Italy
- Prague, Czech Republic

- Rotterdam, Netherlands
- Turku, Finland

- Ulm, Germany
- Vienna, Austria
