= Borophene =

Allotrope of boron

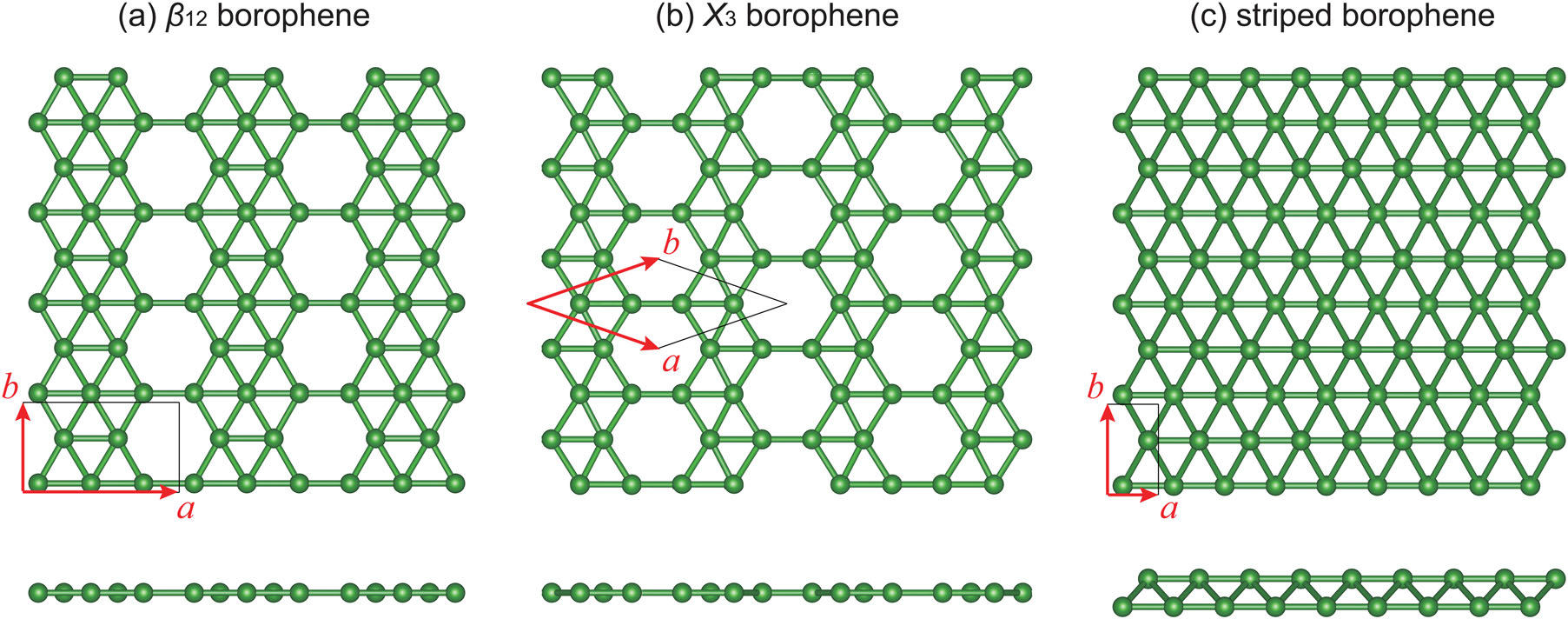
Figure 1: Likely crystal structures of experimentally obtained borophenes: (a) β_{12} borophene (a.k.a. γ sheet or υ_{1/6} sheet), (b) χ_{3} borophene (a.k.a. υ_{1/5} sheet)

Borophene is a crystalline atomic monolayer of boron, i.e., it is a two-dimensional allotrope of boron and also known as boron sheet. First predicted by theory in the mid-1990s, different borophene structures were experimentally confirmed in 2015.

== Properties ==
Experimentally various atomically thin, crystalline and metallic borophenes were synthesized on clean metal surfaces under ultrahigh-vacuum conditions. Its atomic structure consists of mixed triangular and hexagonal motifs, such as shown in Figure 1. The atomic structure is a consequence of an interplay between two-center and multi-center in-plane bonding, which is typical for electron deficient elements like boron.

Borophenes exhibit in-plane elasticity and ideal strength. It can be stronger than graphene, and more flexible, in some configurations. Boron nanotubes are also stiffer than graphene, with a higher 2D Young's modulus than any other known carbon and noncarbon nanostructures. Since borophene is theoretically predicted to have metallic electronic structures and boron is lighter than most elements, borophene is expected to be the lightest experimentally realizable 2D metal. As with most 2D materials, borophene is expected to have anisotropic properties. In terms of mechanical properties, v_{1/6} (where the fraction denotes the hollow hexagon density) borophene is theoretically predicted to have an in-plane modulus of up to 210 N/m, Poisson's ratio of up to 0.17. Furthermore, the modulus is predicted to be relatively invariant to phase as v varies from 1/5 to 1/9. This is a particularly salient point because borophenes undergo novel structural phase transition under in-plane tensile loading instead of fracturing due to the fluxional nature of their multi-center in-plane bonding. v_{1/6} borophene is also predicted to have an out-of-plane bending stiffness of 0.39 eV, smaller than any reported 2D material. The ratio of the modulus to the stiffness (a.k.a. the Foppl–von Karman number per unit area) which effectively characterizes a material's flexibility is around 570 nm^{−2} for the v_{1/6} phase. These predicted properties are partially supported by experimental work, where v_{1/6} borophene was synthesized on a surface reconstructed Ag(111) substrate. Instead of growing as flat, planar borophene sheets as expected for flat Ag(111) substrates, the borophene took on an undulating configuration closely following the protruding rows arising from the surface reconstructed Ag(111) substrate. Ideal flexible electronics require the ability to be stressed, compressed, and even twisted into a wide array of geometries; however, most 2D materials reported to date are unable to meet all of these criteria since they are stiff against in-plane deformation. Undulated borophene is a promising material for flexible electronics as undulated 2D materials adhered to elastomeric substrates should remain easy to bend and afford large in-plane deformations. The undulated borophene's mechanical properties were studied using first principles calculations and were found to have similar values for the aforementioned mechanical properties. Comparing these values to graphene, the prototypical 2D material, the modulus and bending stiffness of borophene is lower while the Poisson's ratio is similar. Notably, the Foppl-von Karman number for the v_{1/6} phase is more than twice that of graphene, indicating that borophenes are flexible atomic layers. Thus, borophenes may have applications such as reinforcing elements for composites and in flexible electronic interconnects, electrodes, and displays.

Borophene also has potential as an anode material for batteries due to high theoretical specific capacities, electronic conductivity, and ion transport properties. Hydrogen easily adsorbs to borophene, offers potential for hydrogen storage – over 15% of its weight. Borophene can catalyze the breakdown of molecular hydrogen into hydrogen ions, and reduce water.

== History ==
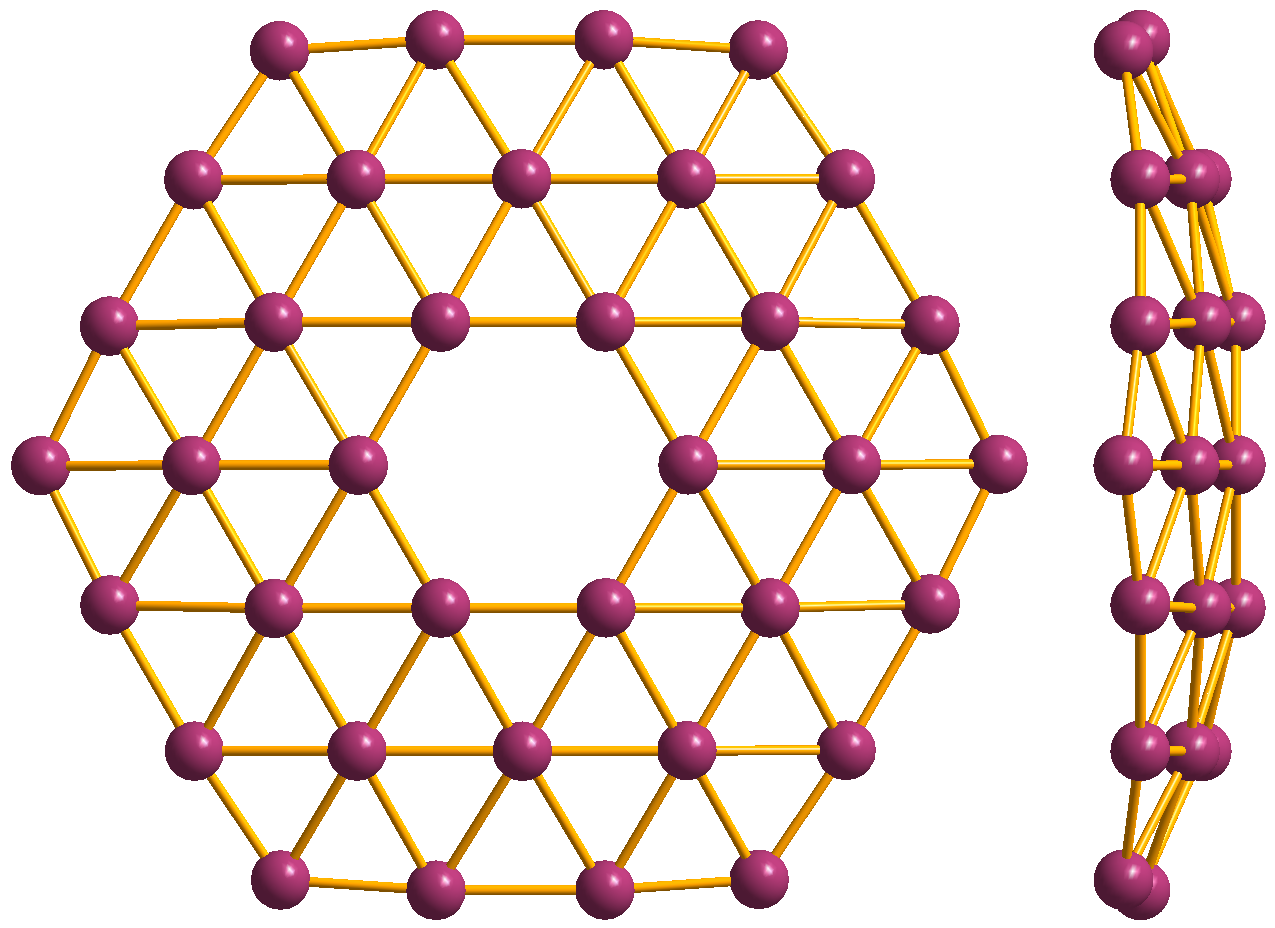
Figure 2: A B_{36} cluster might be seen as smallest borophene; front and side view

Computational studies by I. Boustani and A. Quandt showed that small boron clusters do not adopt icosahedral geometries like boranes, instead they turn out to be quasi-planar (see Figure 2). This led to the discovery of a so-called Aufbau principle that predicts the possibility of borophene (boron sheets), boron fullerenes (borospherene) and boron nanotubes.

Additional studies showed that extended, triangular borophene (Figure 1(c)) is metallic and adopts a non-planar, buckled geometry. Further computational studies, initiated by the prediction of a stable B_{80} boron fullerene, suggested that extended borophene sheets with honeycomb structure and with partially filled hexagonal holes are stable. These borophene structures were predicted to be metallic. The so-called γ sheet (a.k.a. β_{12} borophene or υ_{1/6} sheet) is shown in Figure 1(a).

The planarity of boron clusters was first experimentally confirmed by the research team of L.-S. Wang. Later they showed that the structure of B_{36} (see Figure 2) is the smallest boron cluster to have sixfold symmetry and a perfect hexagonal vacancy, and that it can serve as a potential basis for extended two-dimensional boron sheets.

After the synthesis of silicene, multiple groups predicted that borophene could potentially be realized with the support of a metal surface. In particular, the lattice structure of borophene was shown to depend on the metal surface, displaying a disconnect from that in a freestanding state.

In 2015 two research teams succeeded in synthesizing different borophene phases on silver (111) surfaces under ultrahigh-vacuum conditions. Among the three borophene phases synthesized (see Figure 1), the v_{1/6} sheet, or β_{12}, was shown by an earlier theory to be the ground state on the Ag(111) surface, while the χ_{3} borophene was previously predicted by Zeng team in 2012. So far, borophenes exist only on substrates; how to transfer them onto a device-compatible substrate is necessary, but remains a challenge.

=== Synthesis ===
Bottom up synthesis is the main approach for the growth of high-quality borophene. The high melting point of boron and the growth of borophenes at moderate temperatures posed a significant challenge for the synthesis of borophenes. Utilizing diborane (B2H6) pyrolysis as a pure boron source, a group of researchers reported the growth of atomic-thickness borophene sheets via chemical vapor deposition (CVD) for the first time. The CVD-borophene layers display an average thickness of 4.2 Å, χ3 crystalline structure, and metallic conductivity.

Atomic-scale characterization, supported by theoretical calculations, revealed structures reminiscent of fused boron clusters consisting of mixed triangular and hexagonal motives, as previously predicted by theory and shown in Figure 1. Scanning tunneling spectroscopy confirmed that the borophenes are metallic. This is in contrast to bulk boron allotropes, which are semiconducting and marked by an atomic structure based on B_{12} icosahedra.

In 2021 researchers announced hydrogenated borophene on a silver substrate, dubbed borophane. The new material was claimed to be far more stable than its component. Hydrogenation reduces oxidation rates by more than two orders of magnitude after ambient exposure.

=== Multilayer borophene ===
Experimental evidence supporting the formation of stacked bilayer and trilayer borophene sheets was first observed in CVD-grown borophene layers. Soon after that, the creation of two-layer borophene was announced in August 2021.

== See also ==
- Allotropes of boron
- Borospherene
- Boron nitride nanosheet
