= Alexander Boldyrev =

Russian-American scientist

Alexander I. Boldyrev
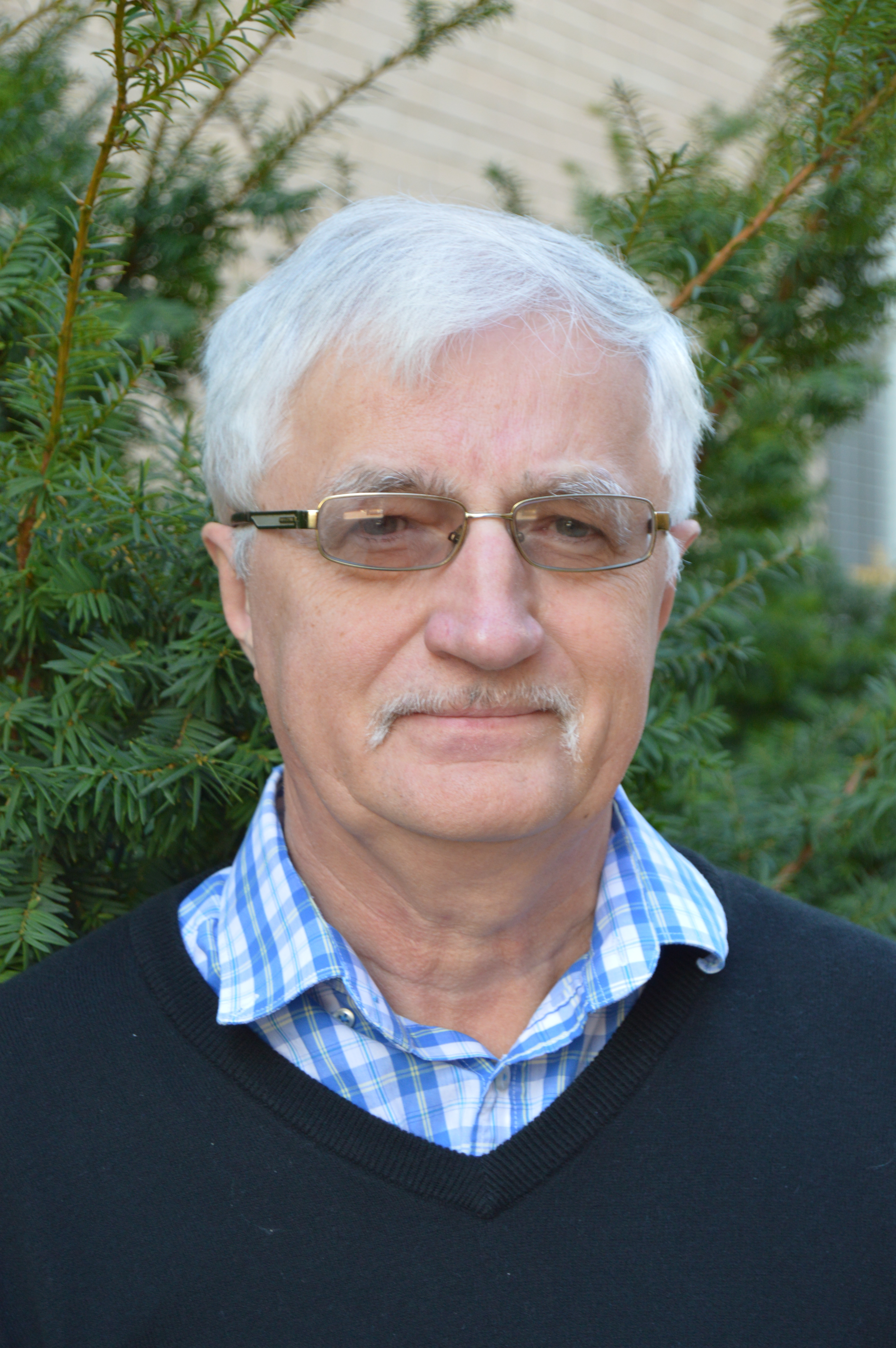
- Born: Alexander Ivanovich Boldyrev; 19 December 1951
- Died: 26 August 2023 (aged 71)
- Education: Novosibirsk University Moscow State University USSR/Physico-Chemical Institute
- Known for: Superhalogens; Superalkalis; Tetracoordinated planar carbon; All-metal aromaticity/antiaromaticity; Multicenter bonding; Multiple aromaticity/antiaromaticity; Conflicting aromaticity; Double inorganic helix; Boron and Aluminum clusters;
- Scientific career
- Fields: Computational Chemistry; Quantum Chemistry; Materials Science;
- Website: ion.chem.usu.edu/~boldyrev/

Alexander I. Boldyrev (December 19, 1951 – August 26, 2023) was a Russian–American computational chemist and R. Gaurth Hansen Professor at Utah State University. Professor Boldyrev is known for his pioneering works on superhalogens, superalkalis, tetracoordinated planar carbon, inorganic double helix, boron and aluminum clusters, and chemical bonding theory, especially aromaticity / antiaromaticity in all-metal structures, and development of the Adaptive Natural Density Partitioning (AdNDP) method.

== Biography and Education ==
Alexander Boldyrev was born in the industrial Siberian city Novokuznetsk. After graduation from Specialized Educational Scientific Center at Novosibirsk University located in Siberian Akademgorodok, he was admitted to the Department of Chemistry at Novosibirsk University. While pursuing the B.Sc./M.Sc. degree, Alexander Boldyrev was doing his research at the Institute of Catalysis, USSR Academy of Sciences under Dr. Vasily Avdeev supervision. During this time, Alexander Boldyrev first encountered quantum-chemical calculations which shaped his further scientific career. After graduation from the university, he moved to another academic city, Chernogolovka, and joined Dr. Oleg Charkin's group when he worked on Non-rigid molecules and polytopic bonds. Later, he extended this study to his Ph.D. thesis which he defended in 1978. Following years, Dr. Boldyrev spent studying superhalogens and superallakis in Chernogolovka.

In 1983, Alexander joined Prof. Ovchinnikov lab at the Institute of Chemical Physics, USSR Academy of Science. In 1986, he received a Doctor of Science degree, the highest scientific degree in the USSR. In 1990, Dr. Boldyrev left USSR to join Paul von Ragué Schleyer group in Germany as a postdoc. There, he made a contribution to the theoretical chemistry of planar tetracoordinate carbon.

Further, Dr. Boldyrev moved to the United States where he worked for 7 year in Prof. Jack Simons research group. His research spanned hypervalent (“Rydberg”) molecules and stability of multiply charged anions (SO_{4}^{2−}, PO_{4}^{3-}) and their solvated forms. In 1999, Dr. Boldyrev became an assistant professor at Utah State University. Six years later, Alexander I. Boldyrev became a Full Professor, and in 2020 was awarded the R. Gaurth Hansen Professorship.

== Research ==
During his academic career, Alexander Boldyrev worked on a wide range of topics related to quantum chemistry and physical chemistry. His works together with Paul von Ragué Schleyer were among the prediction of new ways to achieve planar tetracoordinated carbon and participated in the first experimental confirmation of such species in molecular beams (e.g. in the atomic cluster Al_{4}C^{−}) with Prof. Lai-Sheng Wang. Dr. Boldyrev and Dr. Gutsev also developed the theory of superhalogens – molecules with high Electron affinity exceeding 7 eV in some cases (while the Electron affinity of halogens are 3-3.6 eV). In analogy to superhalogens, Boldyrev and Gutsev introduced superalkalis, species with extremely low Ionization potential, lower than that of a Caesium atom. Alexander Boldyrev together with Lai-Sheng Wang made a large contribution to the theory of chemical bonding, especially in the topic of Aromaticity and Antiaromaticity.

=== Adaptive Natural Density Partitioning Algorithm ===
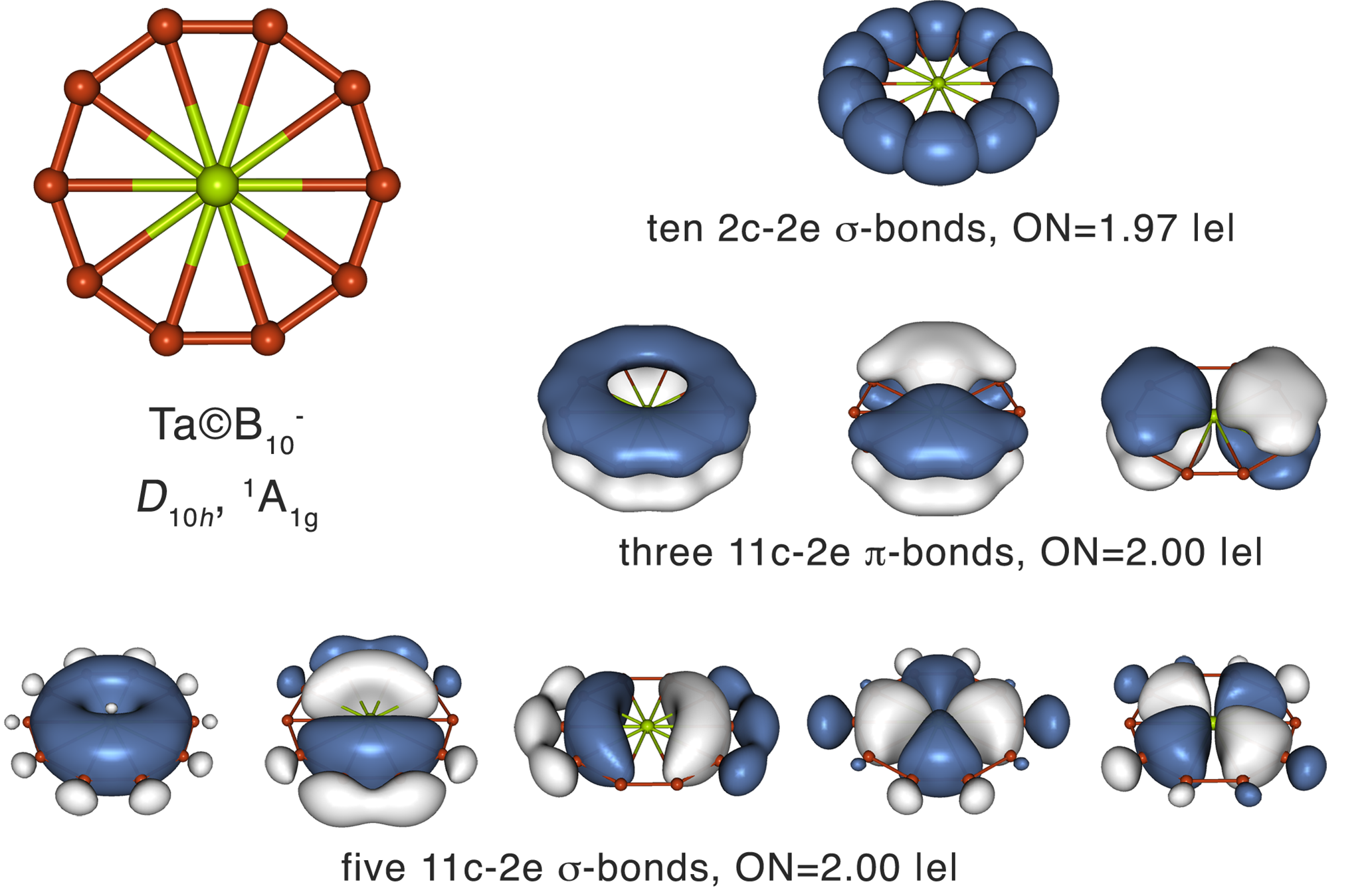
Example of AdNDP analysis of TaB_{10}^{−} molecule. The following notation is used here: n-center 2-electron bonding element is denoted as nc-2e; occupation number is denoted as ON.

The Adaptive Natural Density Partitioning Algorithm (AdNDP) is a theoretical tool for deciphering chemical bonding. It is generally applicable to any chemical system including molecules, clusters, mechanically bonded structures and solvated species. The algorithm was developed in 2008 by Dmitry Zubarev and Alexander Boldyrev. The AdNDP is based on the concept of occupancies of multicenter bonds. Thus, it represents the electronic structure in terms of n-center two-electron (nc-2e) bonds. AdNDP recovers both Lewis bonding elements (1c-2e and 2c-2e elements, corresponding to the lone pairs and two-center two-electron bonds, respectively) and deslocalized bonding elements, which are associated with the concepts of aromaticity and antiaromaticity. From this point of view, AdNDP achieves a seamless description of systems featuring both localized and delocalized bonding without invoking the concept of resonance (although, AdNDP is also capable of providing resonance structures). Essentially, AdNDP is a very efficient and illustrative approach for interpretation of the molecular orbital-based wave functions. AdNDP is closely related to Natural bond orbital theory but allows any number of atoms to participate in bond localization.

In 2013, a Solid State Adaptive Natural Density Partitioning (SSAdNDP), an extension of AdNDP, was introduced by Timur Galeev and Alexander Boldyrev in collaboration with Benjamin D. Dunnington and J. R. Schmidt. The algorithm enables the application of AdNDP formalism to periodic systems. As in the original AdNDP algorithm, SSAdNDP allows the interpretation of chemical bonding in systems with translational symmetry in terms of classical lone pairs, two-center bonds, as well as multi-center delocalized bonding elements.

== Honors and awards ==
- Alexander von Humboldt Fellowship, Germany, January 1990 - December 1992.
- The Utah State College of Science Researcher of the Year for 2005.
- The D. Wynne Thorne Career Research Award for 2009 at Utah State University.
- The 2008 American Chemical Society Utah Award in Chemistry.
- Fulbright Scholarship, September 1 – November 30, 2012, Comenius University, Bratislava, Slovak Republic.
- Alexander von Humboldt Alumni Award, March 1 – May 31, 2013, Marburg University, Marburg, Germany.
- The University Outstanding Graduate Mentor for 2017. Office of Research and Graduate Studies, Utah State University, March 21, 2017, USU.
- The R. Gaurth Hansen Professor, November 2020 - November 2023, Department of Chemistry and Biochemistry, Utah State University.
- American Association for the Advancement of Science Fellow, January 2022

== Selected publications ==
- “DVM-Xa Calculations on the Ionization Potentials of [MX_{k+1}]^{−} Complex Anions and the Electron Affinities of MX_{k+1} "Superhalogens"” G. L. Gutsev and A. I. Boldyrev, Chem. Phys., 56, 277, (1981).
- “DVM-Xa Calculations on the Electronic Structure of "Superalkali" Cations” G. L. Gutsev and A. I. Boldyrev, Chem. Phys. Lett., 92, 262 (1982).
- “Tetracoordinate Planar Carbon in the Al_{4}C^{−} Anion. A Combined Photoelectron Spectroscopy and Ab Initio Study.” X. Li, W. Chen, L. S. Wang, A. I. Boldyrev, and J. Simons, J. Am Chem. Soc., 121, 6033 (1999).
- “Observation of All-Metal Aromatic Molecules.” X. Li, A.E. Kuznetsov, H.-F. Zhang, A.I. Boldyrev, L. S. Wang, Science, 291, 859-861 (2001).
- “All-Metal Antiaromatic Molecule: Rectangular Al_{4}^{4-} in the Li_{3}Al_{4}^{−} Anion”, A.E. Kuznetsov, K.A. Birch, A.I. Boldyrev, X. Li, H.-J. Zhai, L. S. Wang, Science, 300, 622 (2003).
- “Hepta- and Octacoordinated Boron in Molecular Wheels of Eight- and Nine-Atom Boron Clusters: Observation and Confirmation.” H.-J. Zhai, A. N. Alexandrova, K. A. Birch, A. I. Boldyrev, L. S. Wang, Angew. Chem. Int. Ed., 42, 6004–6008, (2003).
- “Developing paradigms of chemical bonding: adaptive natural density partitioning” D. Yu. Zubarev, A. I. Boldyrev, Phys. Chem. Chem. Phys., 10, 5207–5217, (2008).
- “A concentric planar doubly π-aromatic B_{19}^{−} cluster”, Wei Huang, Alina P. Sergeeva, Hua-Jin Zhai, Boris B. Averkiev, Lai-Sheng Wang, Alexander I. Boldyrev, Nat. Chem., 2, 202–206, (2010).
