= Anastassia Alexandrova =

American chemist

- Education: Saratov University; Utah State University
- Scientific career
- Workplaces: University of California, Los Angeles
- Thesis: Multiply aromatic clusters via ab initio genetic algorithm (2005)
- Website: Alexandrova Lab

Anastassia N. Alexandrova is an American chemist who is a professor at the University of California, Los Angeles. Her research considers the computational design of functional materials.

== Early life and education ==
Alexandrova was the Winner of the Russian Regional Student Olympiad in Chemistry in 2000. She attended the Saratov State University for her undergraduate studies, where she was awarded a scholarship from the Government of Russia for outstanding performance in science. She moved to the United States for her graduate studies at Utah State University, where she studied aromatic clusters using Ab initio genetic algorithms. In particular, she developed the Gradient Embedded genetic Algorithm (GEGA) to identify the minima of atomic clusters. After earning her doctorate, Alexandrova moved to Yale University, where she joined the laboratory of William L. Jorgensen. She also worked in the laboratory of John C. Tully where she studied the photochemistry of DNA fragments.

== Research and career ==
Alexandrova was appointed to the faculty at the University of California, Los Angeles (UCLA) in 2010. She develops multi-scale modeling methods to better understand novel functional materials and teaches. The materials considered by Alexandrova included quantum dots, artificial metalloenzymes, heterogeneous catalysis and ultra hard alloys. She makes use of various computational models, including density functional theory, molecular dynamics and ab initio quantum chemistry methods. Alexandrova spent 2016 as a Fulbright Program scholar at the École Normal Supérieure where she focused on computational catalysis. In 2024, she was appointed as UCLA's Charles W. Clifford Jr. Chair in Chemistry & Biochemistry.

== Awards and honors ==
- 2014 National Science Foundation CAREER Award
- 2015 American Chemical Society Rising Star Award
- 2016 Fulbright Fellow at the École normale supérieure
- 2018 University of California, Los Angeles Undergraduate Research Week Faculty Mentor Awards
- 2019 University of California, Los Angeles Distinguished Teaching Award for Senate Faculty
- 2020 American Chemical Society Physical Chemistry Division Early Career Award in Theoretical Chemistry
- 2021 Max Planck-Humboldt medal, for scientists with outstanding potential outside Germany.
- 2023 Brown Investigation Award by the Brown Science Foundation
- 2024 Faraday Horizon Prize, Royal Society of Chemistry
- 2024 Quantum Bio-Inorganic Chemistry (QBIC) Prize
- 2026 Recipient of the Swiss Chemical Society Lectureship 2027

== Selected publications ==
- Hua-Jin Zhai; Anastassia N Alexandrova; K Alexander Birch; Boldyrev, Alexander; Lai-Sheng Wang (2003). "Hepta- and octacoordinate boron in molecular wheels of eight- and nine-atom boron clusters: observation and confirmation". Angewandte Chemie International Edition. 42 (48): 6004–6008. doi:10.1002/anie.200351874. PMID 14679555. Wikidata Q44696251.
- Anastassia N Alexandrova; Boldyrev, Alexander; You-Jun Fu; Xin Yang; Xue-Bin Wang; Lai-Sheng Wang (2004). "Structure of the Na(x)Cl(x+1) (-) (x=1-4) clusters via ab initio genetic algorithm and photoelectron spectroscopy". The Journal of Chemical Physics. 121 (12): 5709–5719. Bibcode:2004JChPh.121.5709A. doi:10.1063/1.1783276. PMID 15366994. Wikidata Q51989691.
- Anastassia N Alexandrova; Boldyrev, Alexander (2005). "Search for the Lin(0/+1/-1) (n = 5-7) Lowest-Energy Structures Using the ab Initio Gradient Embedded Genetic Algorithm (GEGA). Elucidation of the Chemical Bonding in the Lithium Clusters". Journal of Chemical Theory and Computation. 1 (4): 566–580. doi:10.1021/ct050093g. PMID 26641677. Wikidata Q51970282.
- O. Dyck, S. Kim, E. Jimenez-Izal, A. N. Alexandrova, S. V. Kalinin, S. Jesse, "Building Structures Atom by Atom via Electron Beam Manipulation" Small 2018, 14, 1801771. https://doi.org/10.1002/smll.201801771. https://onlinelibrary.wiley.com/doi/full/10.1002/smll.201801771.
