= Allotropes of boron =

Different forms of boron

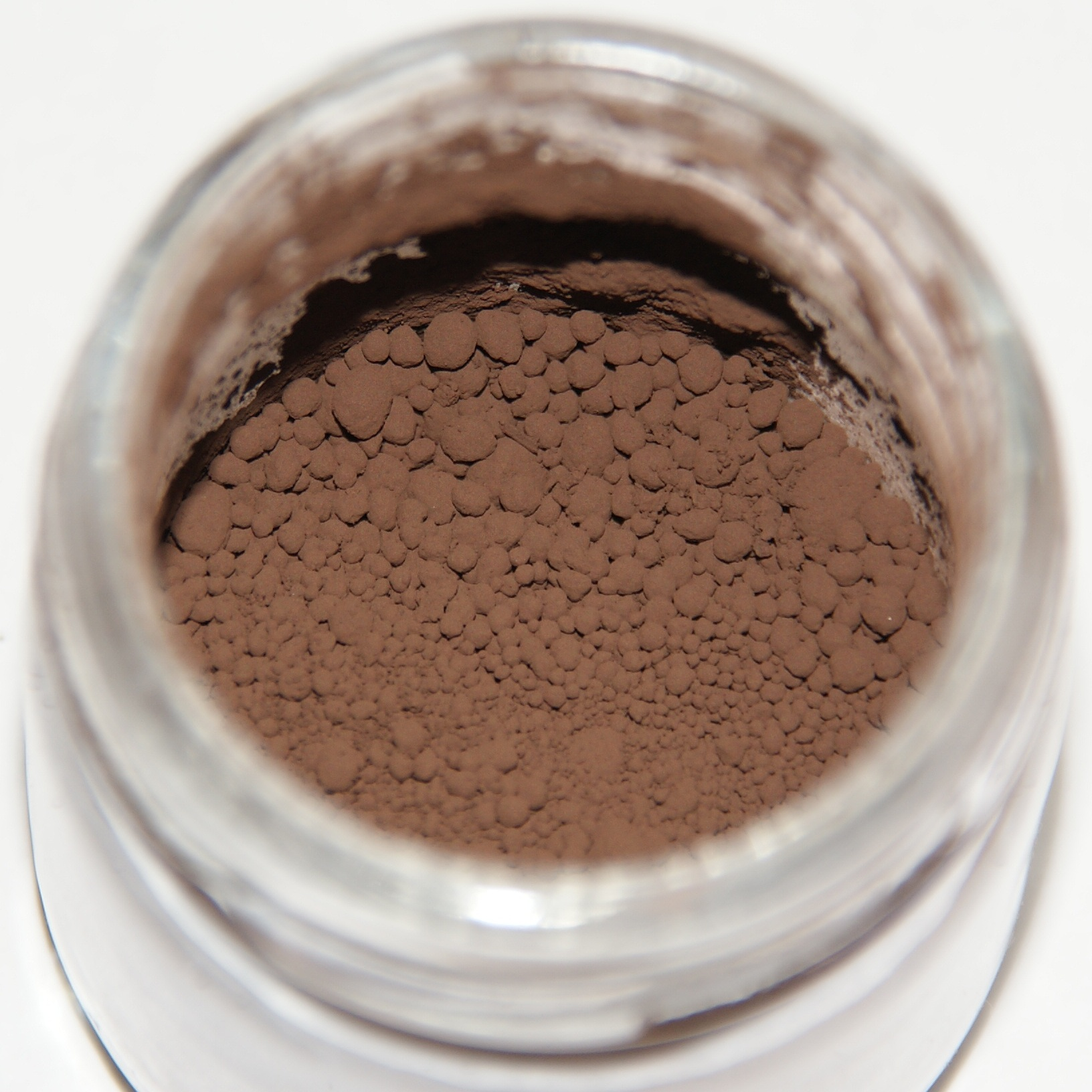
Amorphous powder boron

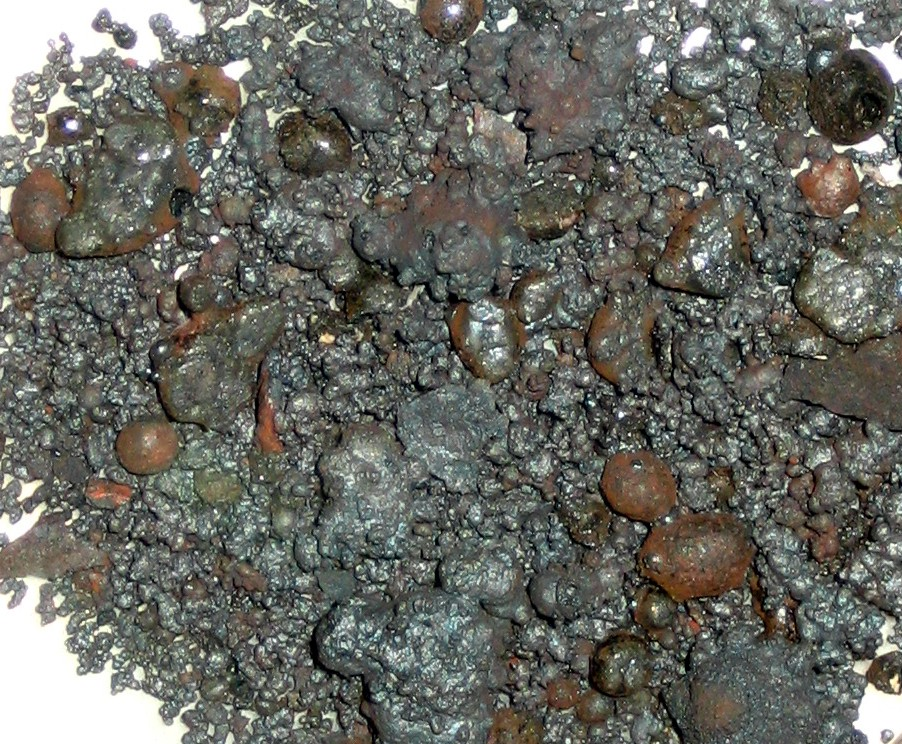
Boron (likely mixed allotropes)

Boron can be prepared in several crystalline and amorphous forms. Well known crystalline forms are α-rhombohedral (α-R), β-rhombohedral (β-R), and β-tetragonal (β-T). In special circumstances, boron can also be synthesized in the form of its α-tetragonal (α-T) and γ-orthorhombic (γ) allotropes. Two amorphous forms, one a finely divided powder and the other a glassy solid, are also known. Although at least 14 more allotropes have been reported, these other forms are based on tenuous evidence or have not been experimentally confirmed, or are thought to represent mixed allotropes, or boron frameworks stabilized by impurities. Whereas the β-rhombohedral phase is the most stable and the others are metastable, the transformation rate is negligible at room temperature, and thus all five phases can exist at ambient conditions. Amorphous powder boron and polycrystalline β-rhombohedral boron are the most common forms. The latter allotrope is a very hard (Note: Vickers hardness comparable to that of cubic boron nitride) grey material, about ten percent lighter than aluminium and with a melting point (2080 °C) several hundred degrees higher than that of steel.

Elemental boron has been found in star dust and meteorites, but does not exist in the high oxygen environment of Earth. It is difficult to extract from its compounds. The earliest methods involved reduction of boric oxide with metals such as magnesium or aluminium. However, the product is almost always contaminated with metal borides. Pure boron can be prepared by reducing volatile boron halides with hydrogen at high temperatures. Very pure boron, for use in the semiconductor industry, is produced by the decomposition of diborane at high temperatures, followed by purification via zone melting or the Czochralski process. Even more difficult to prepare are single crystals of pure boron phases, due to polymorphism and the tendency of boron to react with impurities; typical crystal size is ~0.1 mm.

== Summary of properties ==
Boron phase	α-R	α-T	β-R	β-T	γ	amorphous	
Boron phase	α-R	α-T	β-R	β-T	γ	Powder	Glassy
Symmetry	Rhombohedral	Tetragonal	Rhombohedral	Tetragonal	Orthorhombic	Semi- random	Semi- random
Occurrence	common	special	common	common	special		
Atoms/unit cell	12	50	105‒108	192	28		
Density (g/cm^{3})	2.46	2.29‒2.39	2.35	2.36	2.52	1.73	2.34–35
Vickers hardness	42 GPa		45 GPa		50–58 GPa		
Bulk modulus	224 GPa		184 GPa		227 GPa		
Band gap (eV)	2	1.55	1.6	1.16	2.1	0.56–0.71	
Color	Crystals are clear red	Black and opaque, with metallic lustre	Dark to shiny silver-grey	Black/red	Dark grey	Black to brown	Opaque black
Source				(Note: Black when viewed by reflected light; red by transmitted light)	(Note: High purity amorphous boron powder is black whereas impure samples have a brown appearance: Lidin R. A. (1996). Inorganic substances handbook. New York: Begell House. p. 22; Zenkov, V. S. (2006). "Adsorption-chemical activity of finely-dispersed amorphous powders of brown and black boron used in synthesizing metal borides". Powder Metallurgy and Metal Ceramics. 45 (5–6): 279–282 (279). doi:10.1007/s11106-006-0076-z. S2CID 97019942.; Loryan, V. E.; Borovinskaya, I. P.; Merzhanov, A. G. (2011). "On combustion of boron in nitrogen gas". International Journal of Self-Propagating High-Temperature Synthesis. 20 (3): 153–155. doi:10.3103/S106138621103006X. S2CID 97864958.; Kanel, G. I.; Utkin, A. V.; Razorenov, S. V. (2009). "Rate of the energy release in high explosives containing nano-size boron particles" (PDF). Central European Journal of Energetic Materials. 6 (1): 15–30 (18).)		
Year first reported	1958	1943/1973 (Note: 1943 was when the supposed structure was first reported; 1973 was when it was first reported that pure α-tetragonal boron can only be synthesized as thin layers deposited on an underlying substrate of isotropic boron carbide or nitride: Kunzmann, P. M. (1973). Structural studies on the crystal chemistry of icosahedral boron framework structure derivatives. PhD thesis. Cornell University; Amberger, E. (1981). "Elemental boron". In Buschbeck, K. C.. Gmelin handbook of inorganic and organometallic chemistry: B Boron, Supplement 2 (8th ed.). Berlin: Springer-Verlag. pp. 1–112 (60–61). ISBN 3-540-93448-0.)	1957	1960	2009	1808	1911

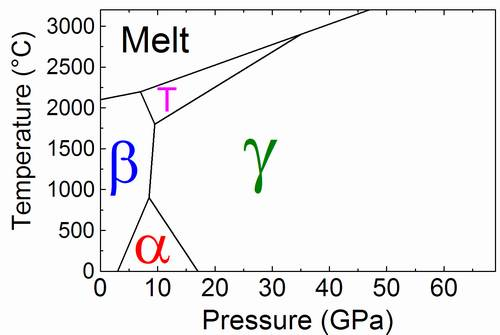
An extract of a phase diagram for boron (α and β are the rhombohedral phases; T is β-tetragonal) (Note: Other (different) phase diagrams have been reported:, Shirai, K. (2010). "Electronic structures and mechanical properties of boron and boron-rich crystals (part 2)". Journal of Superhard Materials. 2 (5): 336–345 (337). doi:10.3103/S1063457610050059. S2CID 138618474.; Parakhonskiy, G.; Dubrovinskaia, N.; Bykova, E.; Wirth, R.; Dubrovinsky, L. (2011). "Experimental pressure-temperature phase diagram of boron: resolving the long-standing enigma". Scientific Reports. 1 (96): 1–7 (2). Bibcode:2011NatSR...1E..96P. doi:10.1038/srep00096. PMC 3216582. PMID 22355614.)

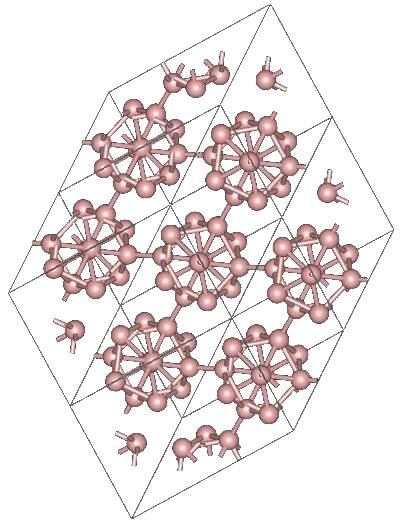
Structure of α-R boron

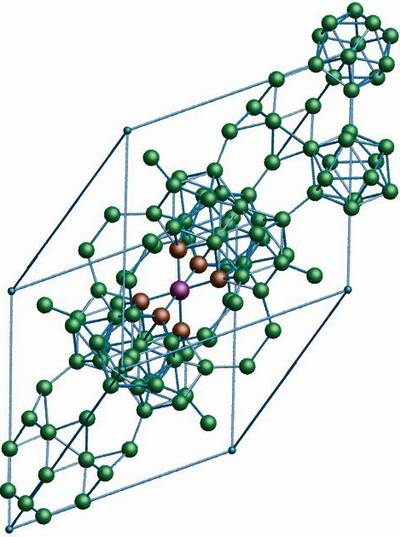
Structure of β-R boron

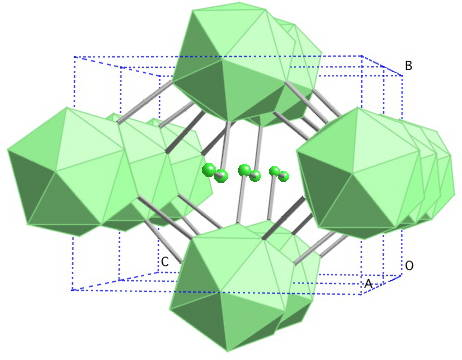
Structure of γ-boron

== α-rhombohedral boron ==
α-rhombohedral boron has a unit cell of twelve boron atoms. The structure consists of B_{12} icosahedra in which each boron atom has five nearest neighbors within the icosahedron. If the bonding were the conventional covalent type then each boron would have donated five electrons. However, boron has only three valence electrons, and it is thought that the bonding in the B_{12} icosahedra is achieved by the so-called 3-center electron-deficient bonds where the electron charge is accumulated at the center of a triangle formed by three adjacent atoms.

The isolated B_{12} icosahedra are not stable, due to the nonuniformity of the honeycomb; thus boron is not a molecular solid, but the icosahedra in it are connected by strong covalent bonds.

== α-tetragonal boron ==
Pure α-tetragonal can only be synthesized as thin layers deposited on an underlying substrate of isotropic boron carbide (B_{50}C_{2}) or nitride (B_{50}N_{2}). Most examples of α-tetragonal boron are in fact boron-rich carbide or nitrides.

== β-rhombohedral boron ==
β-rhombohedral boron has a unit cell containing 105–108 (ideally exactly 105) atoms. Most atoms form B_{12} discrete icosahedra; a few form partially interpenetrating icosahedra, and there are two deltahedral B_{10} units, and a single central B atom. For a long time, it was unclear whether the α or β phase is most stable at ambient conditions; however, gradually a consensus was reached that the β phase is the most thermodynamically stable allotrope. It exhibits a Mohs hardness of 9.5, and is one of the hardest pure elements, only surpassed by carbon (as diamond).

== β-tetragonal boron ==
The β phase was produced in 1960 by hydrogen reduction of BBr_{3} on hot tungsten, rhenium or tantalum filaments at temperatures 1270–1550 °C (i.e. chemical vapor deposition). Further studies have reproduced the synthesis and confirmed the absence of impurities in this phase.

== γ-boron ==
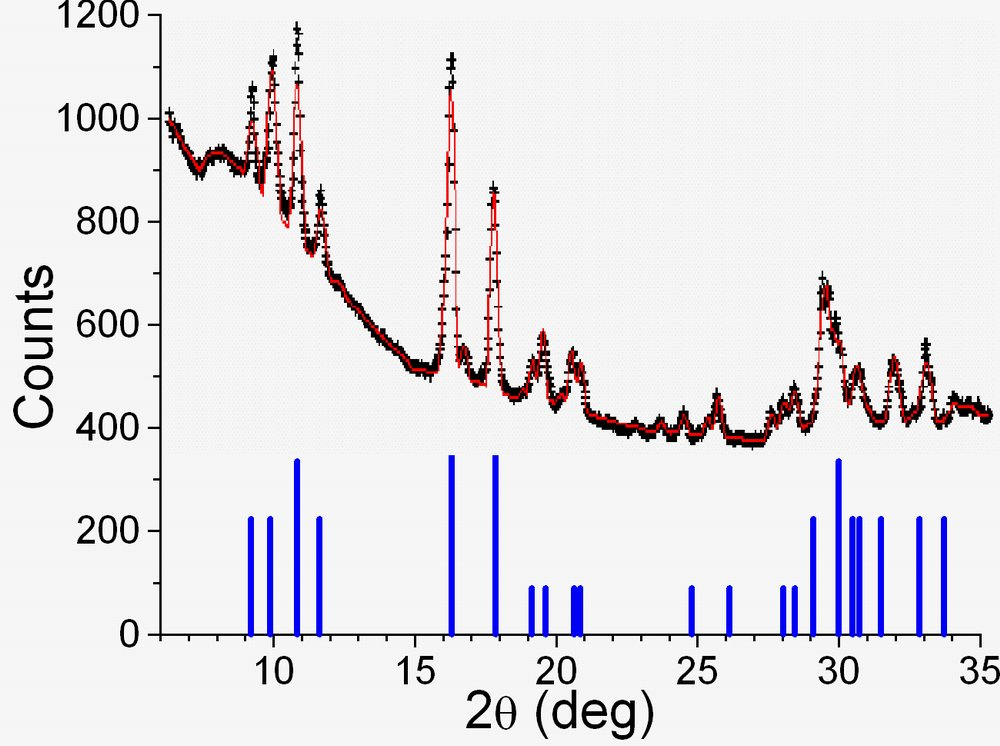
γ-boron: Comparison of X-ray diffraction data of Wentorf (bottom) with the modern data

The γ-phase can be described as a NaCl-type arrangement of two types of clusters, B_{12} icosahedra and B_{2} pairs. It can be produced by compressing other boron phases to 12–20 GPa and heating to 1500–1800 °C, and remains stable at ambient conditions. There is evidence of significant charge transfer from B_{2} pairs to the B_{12} icosahedra in this structure; in particular, lattice dynamics suggests the presence of significant long-range electrostatic interactions.

This phase was reported by Wentorf in 1965; however, neither structure nor chemical composition were established. The structure was solved using ab initio crystal structure prediction calculations and confirmed using single crystal X-ray diffraction.

== Cubic boron ==
Sullenger et al. (1969) and McConville et al. (1976) reported a cubic allotrope of boron, obtained in argon plasma experiments, with a unit cell of 1705±3 atoms and a density of 2.367 g/cm^{3}. While this allotrope is occasionally mentioned in the literature, no subsequent work appears to have been published either confirming or discrediting its existence. Donohue (1982) commented that the number of atoms in the unit cell did not appear to be icosahedrally related (the icosahedron being a motif common to boron structures).

== High-pressure superconducting phase ==
Compressing boron above 160 GPa produces a boron phase with an as yet unknown structure. Contrary to other phases, which are semiconductors, this phase is a metal and becomes a superconductor with a critical temperature increasing from 6 K at 160 GPa to 11 K at 250 GPa. This structural transformation occurs at pressures at which theory predicts the icosahedra will dissociate. Speculation as to the structure of this phase has included face-centred cubic (analogous to Al); α-Ga, and body-centred tetragonal (analogous to In). It has also been suggested that the nonmetal-metal transition is simply the result of a band gap closure, as occurs with iodine, rather than a structural transition.

== Borophene ==
There exist several two-dimensional forms of boron (together called borophenes), and even more are predicted theoretically.

== Borospherene ==
The discovery of the quasispherical allotropic molecule borospherene (B_{40}) was announced in July 2014.

== Amorphous boron ==
Amorphous boron contains B_{12} regular icosahedra that are randomly bonded to each other without long range order. Pure amorphous boron can be produced by thermal decomposition of diborane at temperatures below 1000 °C. Annealing at 1000 °C converts amorphous boron to β-rhombohedral boron. Amorphous boron nanowires (30–60 nm thick) or fibers can be produced by magnetron sputtering and laser-assisted chemical vapor deposition, respectively; and they also convert to β-rhombohedral boron nanowires upon annealing at 1000 °C.

== Bibliography ==
- Amberger, E. (1981). "Elemental boron". In Buschbeck, K. C. (ed.). Gmelin handbook of inorganic and organometallic chemistry: B Boron, Supplement 2 (8th ed.). Berlin: Springer-Verlag. pp. 1–112. ISBN 3-540-93448-0.
- Donohue, J. (1982). The structures of the elements. Malabar, Florida: Robert E. Krieger. ISBN 0-89874-230-7.
- Hoard, J. L.; Sullenger, D. B.; Kennard, C. H. L.; Hughes, R. E. (January 1970). "The structure analysis of β-rhombohedral boron". Journal of Solid State Chemistry. 1 (2): 268–277. Bibcode:1970JSSCh...1..268H. doi:10.1016/0022-4596(70)90022-8.
- Housecroft, C. E.; Sharpe, A. G. (2008). Inorganic chemistry (3rd ed.). Harlow: Pearson Education. ISBN 978-0-13-175553-6.
- Madelung, O. (1983). Landolt-Bornstein numerical data and functional relationships in science and technology. New series. Group III. Volume 17: Semiconductors. Subvolume e: Physics of non-tetrahedrally bonded elements and binary compounds I. Springer-Verlag: New York. ISBN 0-387-11780-6.
- Nelmes, R. J.; Loveday, J. S.; Allan, D. R.; Besson, J. M.; Hamel, G.; Grima, P.; Hull, S. (1993). "Neutron- and x-ray-diffraction measurements of the bulk modulus of boron". Physical Review B. 47 (13): 7668–7673. Bibcode:1993PhRvB..47.7668N. doi:10.1103/PhysRevB.47.7668. PMID 10004773.
- Oganov, A. R.; Chen, J.; Ma, Y.; Glass, C. W.; Yu, Z.; Kurakevych, O. O.; Solozhenko, V. L. (12 Feb 2009). "Ionic high-pressure form of elemental boron". Nature. 457 (7027): 863–868. arXiv:0911.3192. Bibcode:2009Natur.457..863O. doi:10.1038/nature07736. PMID 19182772. S2CID 4412568.
- Sullenger, D. B.; Phipps, K. D.; Seabaugh, P. W.; Hudgens, C. R.; Sands, D. E.; Cantrell, J. S. (1969). "Boron modifications produced in an induction-coupled argon plasma". Science. 163 (3870): 935‒937. Bibcode:1969Sci...163..935S. doi:10.1126/science.163.3870.935. PMID 17737317. S2CID 25956278.
- Talley, C. P.; La Placa, S.; Post, B. (1960). "A new polymorph of boron". Acta Crystallographica. 13 (3): 271‒2. doi:10.1107/S0365110X60000613.
- Wang, Y. Q.; Duan, X. F. (2003). "Crystalline boron nanowires". Applied Physics Letters. 82 (2): 272. Bibcode:2003ApPhL..82..272W. doi:10.1063/1.1536269. S2CID 122278136.
- Wentorf, R. H. (1965). "Boron: Another form". Science. 147 (3653): 49–50. Bibcode:1965Sci...147...49W. doi:10.1126/science.147.3653.49. PMID 17799779. S2CID 20539654.
- Wiberg, N. (2001). Inorganic chemistry. San Diego: Academic Press. ISBN 0-12-352651-5.
- Will, G.; Kiefer, B. (2001). "Electron deformation density in rhombohedral α-boron". Zeitschrift für anorganische und allgemeine Chemie. 627 (9): 2100‒104. doi:10.1002/1521-3749(200109)627:9<2100::AID-ZAAC2100>3.0.CO;2-G.
- Zarechnaya, E. Y.; Dubrovinsky, L.; Dubrovinskaia, N.; Filinchuk, Y.; Chernyshov, D.; Dmitriev, V.; Miyajima, N.; El Goresy, A.; et al. (2009). "Superhard semiconducting optically transparent high pressure phase of boron". Physical Review Letters. 102 (18): 185501‒4. Bibcode:2009PhRvL.102r5501Z. doi:10.1103/PhysRevLett.102.185501. PMID 19518885. S2CID 14942345.
