= Selina Wang =

American journalist (born 1993)

- 王思琳
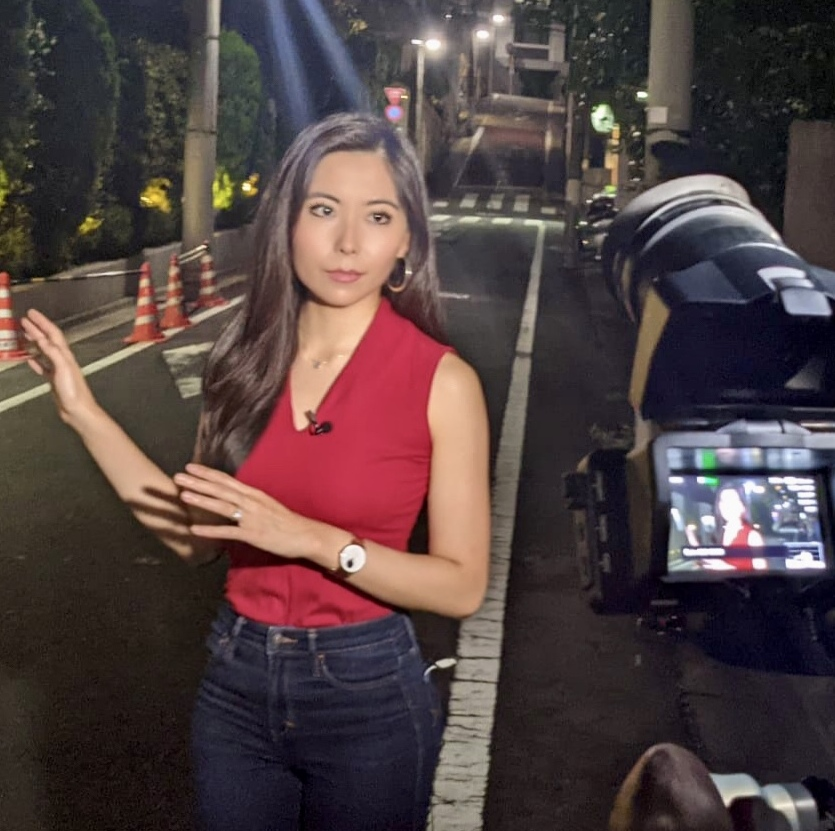
- Wang reporting in 2021 from Tokyo
- Born: May 8, 1993 (age 33); Richland, Washington
- Education: Harvard College (BA)
- Occupation: Journalist
- Employers: Bloomberg News (2015–2020); CNN (2020–2023); ABC News (2023–present)
- Title: Senior White House correspondent, ABC News
- Spouse: Evan Ramsay
- Children: 1
- Relatives: Lai-Sheng Wang (father)

Selina Wang
- Chinese: 王思琳
Transcriptions
Standard Mandarin
- Hanyu Pinyin: Wáng Sīlín
- Wade–Giles: Wang^{2}Ssu^{1}lin^{2}

Selina Wang (born May 8, 1993) is an American television journalist and reporter, who has served as senior White House Correspondent for ABC News since August 2023. She was previously CNN's international correspondent based in Beijing and Tokyo. She has also worked for Bloomberg News as an anchor, correspondent, reporter and magazine writer. In 2023, she won an Emmy at the 44th News and Documentary Emmy Awards, and was featured the Forbes 30 Under 30 Asia List.

== Early life ==
Wang was born in Richland, Washington, before attending Barrington High School in Barrington, Rhode Island where she was an accomplished flautist and named Miss Rhode Island's Outstanding Teen. She graduated from Harvard University with a degree in economics and a secondary degree in government where she wrote for The Harvard Crimson. Her parents Lai-Sheng Wang and Li-Qiong Wang are both faculty in the Department of Chemistry at Brown University.

== Career ==
Wang began her career as a journalist at Bloomberg News in New York City. She then moved to San Francisco, covering the global technology industry, venture capital and social media industry for Bloomberg News and Television and Bloomberg Businessweek magazine. Later, she moved to Beijing, China to anchor and correspondent for Bloomberg Television.

Wang joined CNN as an international correspondent based in Asia. She moved to Japan and in 2021 covered the Tokyo Summer Olympics, held under the coronavirus pandemic. Six months later, she was CNN's only news correspondent reporting from inside the Beijing Winter Olympics "covid bubble." Wang was a host of CNN's business feature show "Marketplace Asia." In the spring of 2022, Wang moved back to Beijing for CNN as the network's sole correspondent in mainland China, and is notable for being the only American broadcaster reporting on the ground in China during the historic anti-zero-COVID protests. She reported on a wide range of stories from China, including rising US-China tensions, Xi Jinping’s unprecedented third-term as the country's supreme leader, China's relationship with Taiwan, and the impact of the country's coronavirus pandemic restrictions.

In 2023, Wang won the Emmy Award for Outstanding Emerging Journalist. Wang was named on the Forbes 30 Under 30 Asia List in 2023.
