= Borospherene =

Chemical compound

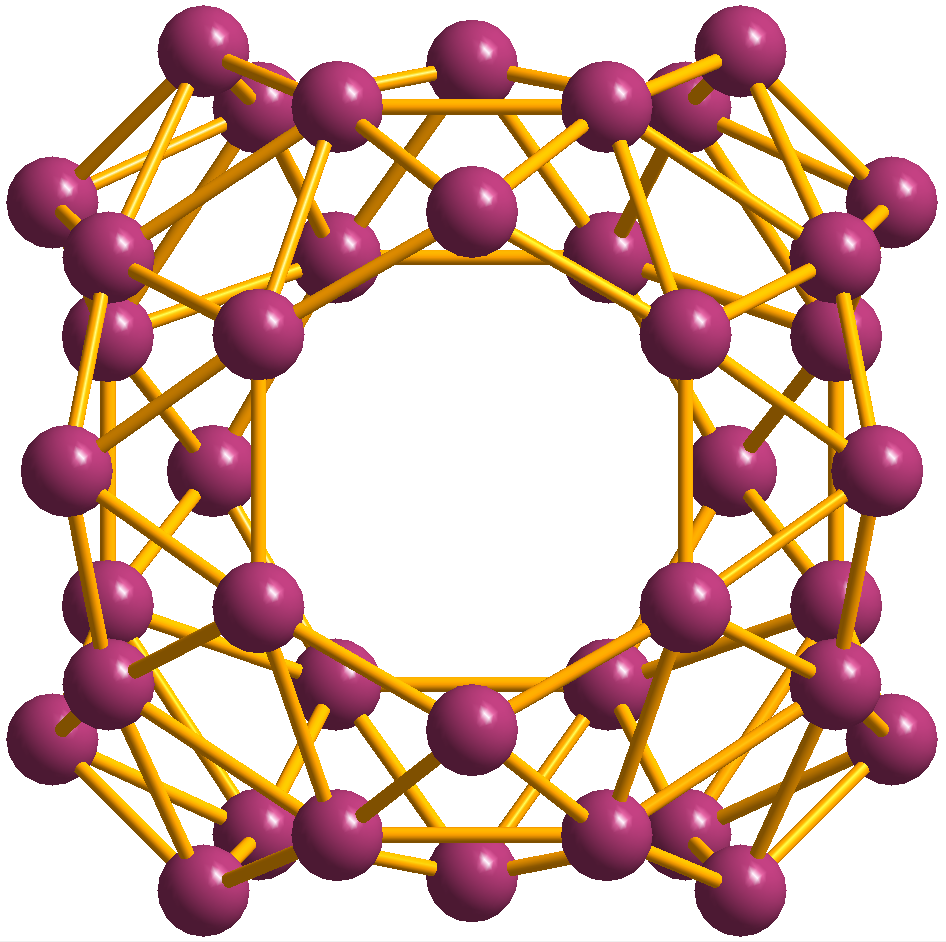
B_{40}° borospherene

Borospherene (B_{40}) is an electron-deficient cluster molecule containing 40 boron atoms. It bears similarities to other homoatomic cluster structures such as buckminsterfullerene (C_{60}), stannaspherene, and plumbaspherene, but with a different symmetry. The first experimental evidence for borospherene was reported in July 2014, and is described in the journal Nature Chemistry. The molecule includes unusual hexagonal and heptagonal faces. Despite many calculation-based investigations into its structure and properties, a viable route for the synthesis and isolation of borospherene has yet to be established, and as a consequence it is still relatively poorly understood.

== History ==
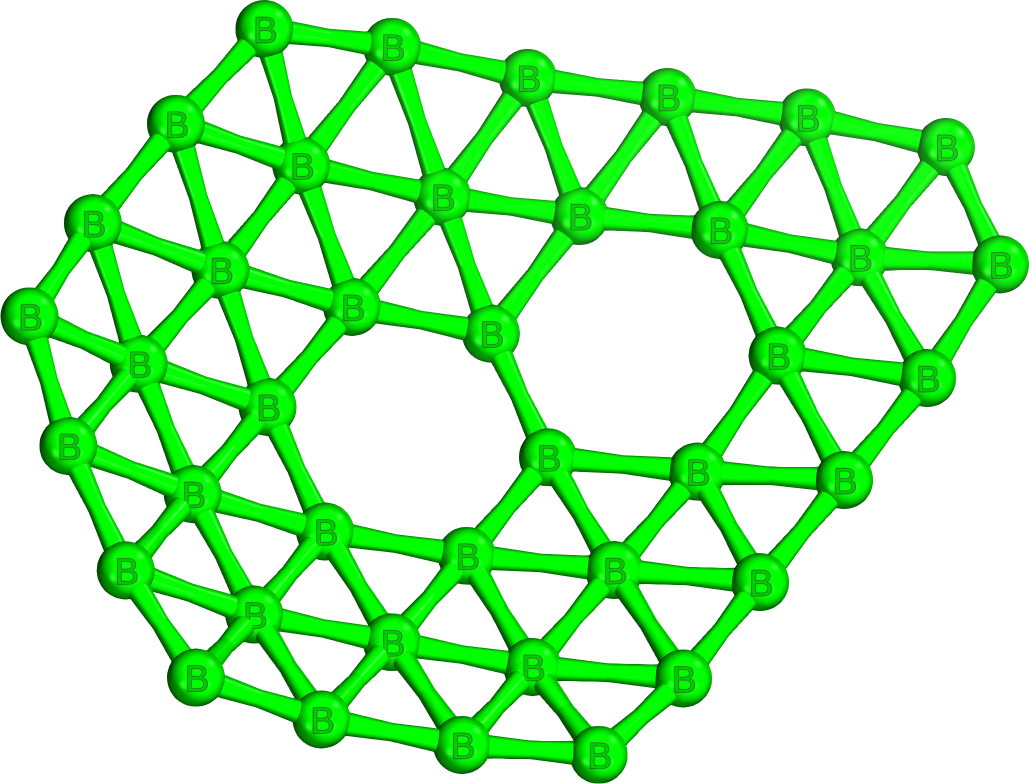
Quasi-planar lowest-lying isomer of B_{40}^{−} anion (C_{s} symmetry).

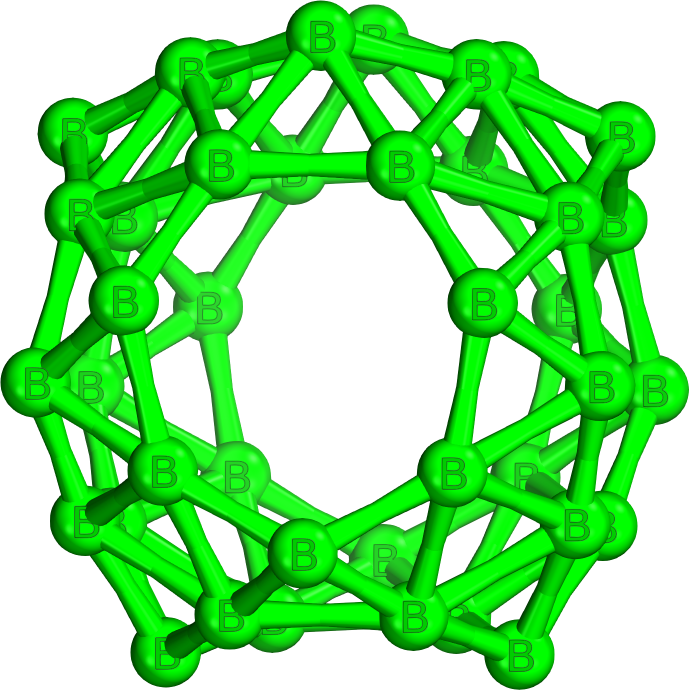
Cage-like second-lowest lying isomer of B_{40}^{−} anion (D_{2d} symmetry)

In 2014, the first experimental evidence of a homoelemental fullerene-like B_{40} cluster was reported by Zhai et al., after decades of theoretical investigations into boron cage structures following the discovery of buckminsterfullerene. Anionic B_{40}^{−} clusters were transiently produced by laser vaporisation of a ^{10}B-enriched boron disc target, and studied with photoelectron spectroscopy. Their experimental spectrum corresponded well to a combination of simulated spectra of a sheet-like, quasi-planar global minimum of the B_{40}^{−} anion (C_{s} symmetry) and its nearly degenerate fullerene-like structural isomer (D_{2d} symmetry). However, the signal in the anion photoelectron spectrum assigned to cage-like B_{40} represents only a very minor fraction of the overall signal. Formation of cage-like B_{40}, termed borospherene, has not been confirmed independently using any other experimental approach.

Many theoretical papers have been published on the structure, properties, and potential applications of borospherene. Neutral borospherene has a large HOMO–LUMO gap of 3.13 eV (which destabilises its anion, making the ground state of B_{40}^{−} the quasi-planar isomer). However, it has been calculated to be prone to exothermic dimerisation, with a low activation barrier of 63 meV, followed by trimerisation with a lower energy barrier, and runaway aggregation. As a result, borospherene has yet to be isolated and is poorly experimentally-characterised, unlike buckminsterfullerene.

== Structure ==
Borospherene has a unique C_{2} axis of symmetry, and belongs to the symmetry group is D_{2d} (antiprismatic symmetry, like a baseball) - in contrast to buckminsterfullerene, which has icosahedral symmetry. It features eight close-packed B_{6} triangles, two staggered hexagonal holes at its top and bottom, as well as four heptagonal holes along its sides. Unusually, the heptagons induce positive Gaussian curvature (as opposed to negative Gaussian curvature in carbon nanotubes), which may play a role in strain reduction contributing to the stability of the cluster.

16 boron atoms of borospherene are four-coordinate, and 24 are five-coordinate. It has four sets of eight equivalent boron atoms, and two sets of four equivalent atoms.

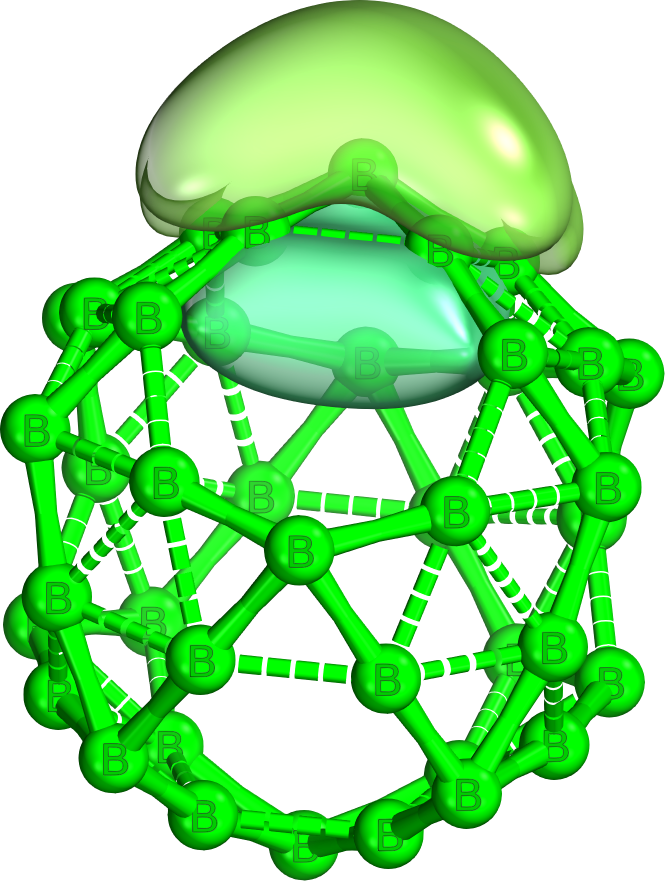
B_{40} HOMO: pi-bond delocalised over 5 boron atoms

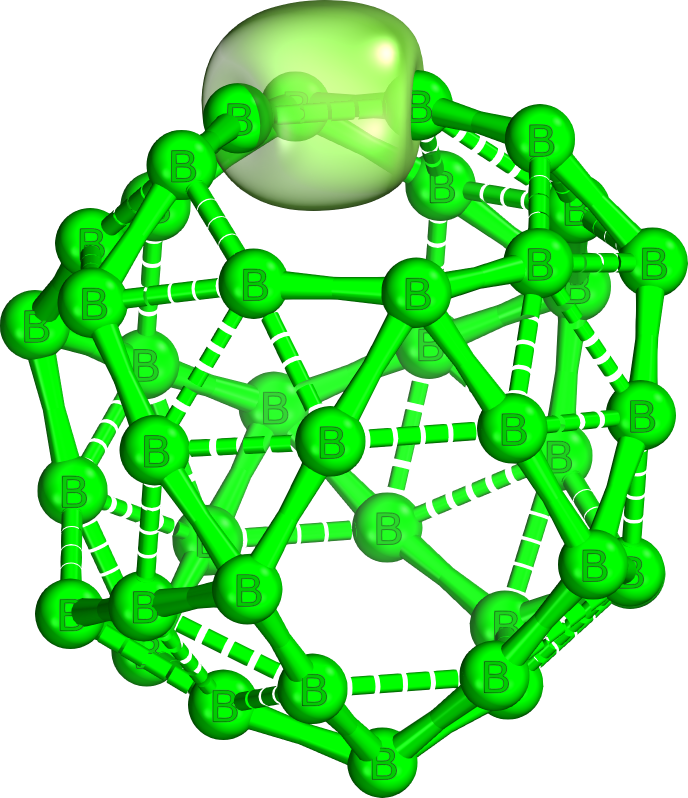
A 3-centre 2-electron delocalised sigma bond typical in borospherene.

Neutral borospherene has a diameter of 6.2 Å. It comprises eleven unique bond lengths ranging from 1.60 Å to 1.85 Å, corresponding to a B-B bond order of slightly below 2 to a fractional B-B bond order respectively. This encapsulates well the large degree of both sigma- and pi-delocalisation of electrons across the electron-deficient cluster as opposed to buckminsterfullerene, which has more localised bonds and features only two bond lengths corresponding to a C-C single bond and a C-C double bond respectively. The HOMO of borospherene is quadruply degenerate, computed to be a pi-bond delocalised over 5 boron atoms.

Lai-Sheng Wang, professor of chemistry at Brown University, modeled possible B_{40} and B_{40}^{−} anion structures. The simulated spectra of two energetically lowest-lying isomers of the anion - a sheet-like structure and a closed cage - were found to fit experimental data well. Photoelectron spectroscopy revealed that the substance formed in the laboratory was this cage. Both neutral borospherene and the cage-like isomer of its anion have the same D_{2d} symmetry, the additional electron in the anion being housed within the B_{40}^{−} cage structure. The structure of the cage is not perfectly uniform – "Several atoms stick out a bit from the others, making the surface of borospherene somewhat less smooth than a buckyball" according to Wang.

== Potential applications ==
The cavity within the cage-like structure of borospherene, as well as borospherene's coordinatively unsaturated hexagonal and heptagonal faces, allows for the possibility of its endohedral or exohedral doping. With metal dopants, significant charge transfer is calculated to occur from the metals to the B_{40} cage - resulting in a positive charge forming on the metal, ostensibly making it capable of polarising small molecules. Such complexes formed are theorised to have applications in catalysis, and the detection or storage of small molecules such as H_{2}.

=== Small molecule sensing ===
Exploiting the thermal stability of B_{40} (calculated to be stable up to 1000 K), Liu et al. investigated, with Van der Waals-corrected density functional theory calculations, the feasibility of using alkali metal-decorated B_{40} for the reversible storage and optical detection of hydrogen. Optimisation of (AM)_{6}B_{40} structures (AM = Li, Na, K) revealed the metal atoms to be distributed above the centres of each hexagon and heptagon of B_{40}, with a large binding energy in each case suggesting these complexes should be stable. H_{2} adsorption to these complexes induced a red-shift in their simulated TDDFT optical spectra in the case of Li_{6}B_{40}, and a blue-shift in the cases of Na_{6}B_{40} and K_{6}B_{40}.

Li et al. computationally investigated undecorated borospherene as a potential sensor for sulfur-containing gases, and found that it behaved as an electronic sensor for sulfur dioxide and carbon disulfide (their adsorption to the boron cluster significantly stabilises its LUMO, increasing its population of conducting electrons), and additionally as a Φ-type sensor for the former (due to significant change to its work function Φ upon the adsorption of SO_{2}), but behaved as neither for the gases carbonyl sulfide and hydrogen sulfide.

=== Small molecule storage ===
Modelling an exohedral Ca_{6}B_{40}, Esrafili et al. simulated carbon dioxide adsorption to the complex and found the upper bound of adsorption to be four CO_{2} molecules per Ca, with an average binding energy of -0.54 eV each - falling within the optimal range of binding energies for a CO_{2} adsorbent (0.40 - 0.80 eV), allowing facile desorption at elevated temperatures.

Undecorated B_{40} was calculated to be a poor candidate for reversible hydrogen storage, being capable of the irreversible sequestration of only one hydrogen molecule per B_{40} within its cage. Li_{6}B_{40}, however, is calculated to be capable of adsorbing up to 18 H_{2} molecules (3 H_{2} molecules at each Li site) - corresponding to a gravimetric density of 7.1 wt% - with a moderate average binding energy of 0.11 eV/H_{2}, within the optimal range for reversible hydrogen storage. Subsequent H_{2} molecules are physisorbed to the cluster instead of chemisorbed, and have a much weaker binding energy.

== See also ==
- Allotropes of boron
- Borophene
- Buckminsterfullerene
