= Diborane(4) =

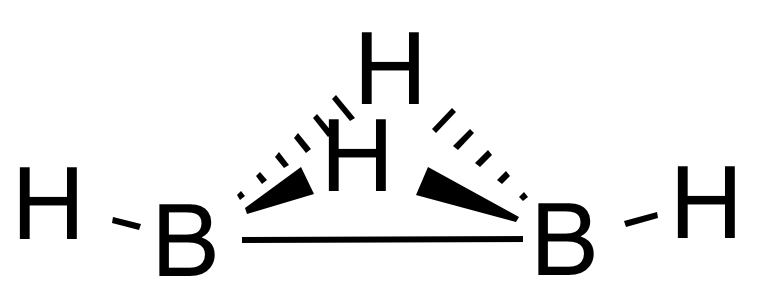

Names
- IUPAC name Diborane(4)

Identifiers
CAS Number	18099-45-1
3D model (JSmol)	Interactive image
ChEBI	CHEBI:38288
ChemSpider	27451
Gmelin Reference	24760
PubChem CID	29529
CompTox Dashboard (EPA)	DTXSID301029767
- InChI: InChI=1S/B2H4/c3-1-2(3)4-1/h1-2H Key: NTSBJDTWOAARNU-UHFFFAOYSA-N
- SMILES: [H]1[BH]2[H][BH]12

Properties
Chemical formula	B_{2}H_{4}
Molar mass	25.65 g·mol^{−1}

Related compounds
Related compounds	Bis(pinacolato)diboron; Diboron tetrafluoride Tetrahydroxydiborane
- Except where otherwise noted, data are given for materials in their standard state (at 25 °C [77 °F], 100 kPa). verify (what is ?) Infobox references

Diborane(4) is a transient inorganic compound with the chemical formula B_{2}H_{4}. Stable derivatives are known.

Diborane(4) has been produced by abstraction of two hydrogen atoms from diborane(6) using atomic fluorine and detected by photoionization mass spectrometry. Computational studies predict a structure in which are two hydrogen atoms bridging the two boron atoms via three-centre two-electron bonds in addition to the 2-centre, 2-electron bond between the two boron atoms and one terminal hydrogen atom bonded to each boron atom.

Several stable derivatives of diborane(4) have been reported.
