= Alexandrov (inhabited locality) =

Alexandrov (Russian: Александров) is the name of several inhabited localities in Russia.

Urban localities

- Alexandrov, Vladimir Oblast, a town in Alexandrovsky District of Vladimir Oblast

Rural localities

- Alexandrov, Oryol Oblast, a settlement in Speshnevsky Selsoviet of Korsakovsky District in Oryol Oblast
- Alexandrov, Rostov Oblast, a khutor in Znamenskoye Rural Settlement of Morozovsky District in Rostov Oblast
