= Yuri Alexandrov =

Yuri Alexandrov may refer to:

- Yuri Alexandrov (boxer) (1963–2013), Russian boxer
- Yuri Alexandrov (director) (born 1950), Russian opera director
- Yuri Alexandrov (ice hockey) (born 1988), Russian ice hockey player
