= B40 Balkan Cities Network =

Balkan intercity organization

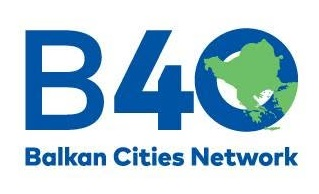
- Logo
- Formation: 2021
- Type: Network of cities
- Headquarters: Istanbul
- Region served: Balkans
- Members: 54 member cities
- Website: b40network.org

The B40 Balkan Cities Network (B40) is an intercity organization between Balkans cities. The network was established with the Istanbul Declaration signed by 23 mayors at the end of the Istanbul Summit held on 29–30 November 2021 with a “Better Future, Better Cooperation” motto. The aim of the network is to create better cooperation between local governments and contribute to regional development.

== History and founding ==
The B40 Balkan Cities Network was established in 2021 as an initiative to strengthen cooperation among local governments in the Balkans. The idea was proposed by Istanbul Mayor Ekrem İmamoğlu, who envisioned a regional platform to promote local democracy, cooperation, peace, and stability. The initiative culminated in the B40 Istanbul Summit on 29–30 November 2021, where representatives of 23 cities formally established the network.

Istanbul held the network's first presidency under İmamoğlu. B40 subsequently expanded, reaching 48 member cities by the Athens Summit in January 2023, when Athens Mayor Kostas Bakoyannis assumed the presidency. The presidency was transferred to Tirana Mayor Erion Veliaj at the Tirana Summit on 29–31 January 2024. Under Veliaj, the network continued its institutional development and expansion, surpassing 70 member cities by December 2024 and adding four observer organizations.

== Member cities ==
As of 2024, the network has 54 member cities.

Member cities
City	State	Population
Acharnes	Greece	108,130
Alexandroupolis	Greece	71,751
Athens	Greece	643,452
Belgrade	Serbia	1,197,714
Belitsa	Bulgaria	9,646
Bijeljina	Bosnia and Herzegovina	107,715
Burgas	Bulgaria	202,694
Chania	Greece	88,525
Constanța	Romania	263,688
Çanakkale	Turkey	143,622
Dimitrovgrad	Bulgaria	31,837
Durrës	Albania	175,110
Edirne	Turkey	180,002
Fierbinți-Târg	Romania	4,620
Galați	Romania	217,851
Istanbul	Turkey	15,907,951
İzmir	Turkey	4,367,251
Karditsa	Greece	56,747
Karlovo	Bulgaria	19,373
Karnobat	Bulgaria	16,483
Kilkis	Greece	51,926
Kırklareli	Turkey	85,493
Kisela Voda	North Macedonia	84,625
Kotor	Montenegro	23,670
Laktaši	Bosnia and Herzegovina	34,966
Lefkada	Greece	22,652
Mytilene	Greece	58,285
Nikšić	Montenegro	72,443
Niš	Serbia	260,237
Orestiada	Greece	37,695
Patras	Greece	215,922
Pella	Greece	2,398
Plovdiv	Bulgaria	346,893
Podgorica	Montenegro	173,024
Prilep	North Macedonia	63,308
Pristina	Kosovo	198,897
Prizren	Kosovo	220,128
Pula	Croatia	52,220
Rakovski	Bulgaria	14,679
Saraj	North Macedonia	38,399
Sarajevo	Bosnia and Herzegovina	275,524
Skopje	North Macedonia	526,502
Sliven	Bulgaria	83,740
Sofia	Bulgaria	1,248,452
Split	Croatia	160,577
Stara Zagora	Bulgaria	158,563
Svilengrad	Bulgaria	16,959
Tekirdağ	Turkey	186,421
Thessaloniki	Greece	319,045
Tirana	Albania	557,422
Troyan	Bulgaria	18,449
Veliko Tarnovo	Bulgaria	71,502
Zagreb	Croatia	767,131
Zenica	Bosnia and Herzegovina	110,663

== See also ==
- Eurocities
