= Evgeny Alexandrov =

Russian ice hockey player

- Born: April 20, 1982 (age 44) Chelyabinsk, Russian SFSR, Soviet Union
- Height: 5 ft 9 in (175 cm)
- Weight: 176 lb (80 kg; 12 st 8 lb)
- Position: Right wing
- Shot: Left
- Played for: KHL; HC Vityaz
- NHL draft: Undrafted
- Playing career: 1998–2013

Evgeny Sergeyevich Alexandrov (Russian: Евгений Сергеевич Александров; born April 20, 1982) is a Russian former professional ice hockey player.

He played 13 games in the Kontinental Hockey League (KHL) with HC Vityaz during the 2008–09 KHL season.
