= Eurocities =

Network of major European cities

- Formation: 1986
- Type: Network of cities
- Location: Brussels
- Region served: Europe
- Members: 200 member cities
- Official language: English
- President: Burkhard Jung
- Secretary general: André Sobczak
- Website: www.eurocities.eu

Eurocities is a network of large cities in Europe, established in 1986 by the mayors of six large cities: Barcelona, Birmingham, Frankfurt, Lyon, Milan, and Rotterdam. Today, Eurocities members include over 200 of Europe's major cities from 38 countries, which between them represent over 130 million people.

Eurocities is one of the major city networks in the EU. It is an example of how city diplomacy is seeking influence and prominence in the established world of international relations. At the EU level, Eurocities promotes the implementation of the European Union's subsidiarity principle. This offers multiple opportunities to engage and influence EU initiatives and policies, especially on urban development and more recently the European Green Deal. Eurocities is sometimes seen as an interest group more focused on re-establishing the power of the city over the nation-state, rather than connecting EU citizens across cities and borders. Recently, EU mayors of the network have tried to raise their global profile for their efforts to tackle climate change.

== Strategy and activities ==
Eurocities coordinates multiple projects in the field of mobility, environmental transition, social inclusion, and digital innovation.

The Eurocities secretariat is based in Brussels, Belgium. The network is led by an executive committee composed of 12 elected cities and their mayors. The executive committee meets at least three times a year and oversees the annual work programme, internal rules and budget, as approved by the annual general meeting (AGM). Thematic work is coordinated in six forums and a number of related working groups covering, among other topics, culture, economic development, environment, knowledge society, mobility, and social affairs.

Eurocities activities include:

Advocacy: representing the voice of cities at EU level, to bring about change on the ground

Insights: Monitoring and communicating to cities the latest EU developments, funding opportunities, and trends affecting them

Sharing of best practices: Facilitating the exchange of knowledge, experience and good practices between cities to scale up urban solutions

Training: develop the capacity to face current and future urban challenges

== Membership criteria ==
Membership of Eurocities is open to any European city with a population of 250,000 or more. Cities within the European Union become full members, and other European cities become associate members. Local authorities of smaller cities, but with a population of more than 50,000 can become partners. Companies and businesses can become associated business partners.

== Members ==
Full and associate members
City	State	Population	Membership
Aarhus	Denmark	335,684	Full member
Aix-Marseille-Provence (Note: Métropole d'Aix-Marseille-Provence.)	France	1,886,842	Full member
Amsterdam	Netherlands	873,338	Full member
Angers Loire Métropole	France	301,245	Full member
Antwerp	Belgium	517,042	Full member
Athens	Greece	664,046	Full member
Banja Luka	Bosnia and Herzegovina	150,997	Associate member
Barcelona	Spain	1,604,555	Full member
Belfast	United Kingdom	351,927	Associate member
Belgrade	Serbia	1,166,763	Associate member
Bergen	Norway	278,121	Full member
Berlin	Germany	3,685,265	Full member
Białystok	Poland	295,459	Full member
Bilbao	Spain	345,141	Full member
Birmingham	United Kingdom	1,176,960	Associate member
Bochum	Germany	365,587	Full member
Bologna	Italy	389,009	Full member
Bonn	Germany	323,587	Full member
Bordeaux	France	246,586	Full member
BrabantStad	Netherlands	912,000	Full member
Braga	Portugal	181,494	Full member
Bratislava	Slovakia	421,801	Full member
Brighton and Hove	United Kingdom	284,170	Associate member
Bristol	United Kingdom	495,260	Associate member
Brno	Czech Republic	377,028	Full member
Brussels	Belgium	178,552	Full member
Brussels Capital Region	Belgium	1,191,604	Full member
Budapest	Hungary	1,759,407	Full member
Burgas	Bulgaria	211,033	Full member
Bydgoszcz	Poland	358,614	Full member
Cagliari	Italy	431,538	Full member
Cardiff	United Kingdom	381,516	Associate member
Chemnitz	Germany	247,252	Full member
Cluj-Napoca	Romania	324,576	Full member
Cologne	Germany	1,025,523	Full member
Constanța	Romania	283,872	Full member
Copenhagen	Denmark	799,033	Full member
Coventry	United Kingdom	364,766	Associate member
Debrecen	Hungary	202,402	Full member
Dortmund	Germany	600,880	Full member
Dresden	Germany	562,764	Full member
Dublin	Ireland	1,501,500	Full member
Düsseldorf	Germany	619,444	Full member
Edinburgh	United Kingdom	531,370	Associate member
Eindhoven	Netherlands	235,691	Full member
Espoo	Finland	281,886	Full member
Essen	Germany	573,618	Full member
Florence	Italy	383,083	Full member
Frankfurt	Germany	746,878	Full member
Gaziantep	Turkey	1,556,381	Associate member
Gdańsk	Poland	464,254	Full member
Genoa	Italy	580,097	Full member
Ghent	Belgium	262,219	Full member
Gijón	Spain	271,843	Full member
Glasgow	United Kingdom	654,330	Associate member
Gothenburg	Sweden	572,779	Full member
Grand Nancy (Note: Métropole du Grand Nancy.)	France	260,665	Full member
Grenoble-Alpes Métropole	France	451,752	Full member
Hamburg	Germany	1,822,445	Full member
Hanover	Germany	534,049	Full member
Helsinki	Finland	648,650	Full member
Istanbul	Turkey	15,519,267	Associate member
İzmir	Turkey	4,367,251	Associate member
Karlsruhe	Germany	311,919	Full member
Katowice	Poland	297,197	Full member
Kharkiv	Ukraine	1,439,036	Associate member
Kiel	Germany	247,441	Full member
Kyiv	Ukraine	2,900,920	Associate member
Leeds	United Kingdom	840,550	Associate member
Leipzig	Germany	581,980	Full member
Lisbon	Portugal	505,526	Full member
Ljubljana	Slovenia	290,010	Full member
Łódź	Poland	687,702	Full member
London	United Kingdom	9,122,909	Associate member
Lublin	Poland	349,103	Full member
Luxembourg	Luxembourg	107,247	Full member
Lviv	Ukraine	727,968	Associate member
Lyon	France	513,275	Full member
Madrid	Spain	3,223,334	Full member
Málaga	Spain	571,026	Full member
Malmö	Sweden	312,012	Full member
Manchester	United Kingdom	588,256	Associate member
Mannheim	Germany	307,997	Full member
Marseille	France	870,731	Full member
Métropole Européenne de Lille	France	1,154,103	Full member
Milan	Italy	1,372,810	Full member
Munich	Germany	1,456,039	Full member
Münster	Germany	311,846	Full member
Murcia	Spain	447,182	Full member
Nantes	France	303,382	Full member
Newcastle upon Tyne	United Kingdom	320,838	Associate member
Nice	France	343,895	Full member
Nicosia	Cyprus	181,234	Full member
Novi Sad	Serbia	346,773	Associate member
Nuremberg	Germany	515,201	Full member
Odesa	Ukraine	1,016,515	Associate member
Oslo	Norway	673,469	Associate member
Oulu	Finland	202,753	Full member
Palermo	Italy	676,118	Full member
Paris	France	2,140,526	Full member
Pilsen	Czech Republic	306,000	Full member
Porto	Portugal	302,472	Full member
Poznań	Poland	537,643	Full member
Prague	Czech Republic	1,301,132	Full member
Reggio Calabria Metropolitan City	Italy	559,215	Full member
Rennes Métropole	France	444,723	Full member
Reykjavík	Iceland	128,830	Associate member
Riga	Latvia	615,369	Full member
Rome	Italy	2,872,800	Full member
Rotterdam	Netherlands	1,015,215	Full member
Rzeszów	Poland	189,662	Full member
Sarajevo	Bosnia and Herzegovina	275,524	Associate member
Seville	Spain	703,021	Full member
Sheffield	United Kingdom	579,517	Associate member
Skopje	North Macedonia	544,086	Associate member
Sofia	Bulgaria	1,238,438	Full member
Saint-Étienne Métropole	France	408,685	Full member
Stockholm	Sweden	960,031	Full member
Strasbourg	France	279,284	Full member
Stuttgart	Germany	632,743	Full member
Sunderland	United Kingdom	287,070	Associate member
Tallinn	Estonia	439,919	Full member
Tampere	Finland	234,441	Full member
Taranto	Italy	198,585	Full member
Tbilisi	Georgia	1,158,700	Associate member
Terrassa Metropolitan Area	Spain	410,000	Full member
The Hague	Netherlands	527,748	Full member
Thessaloniki	Greece	325,182	Full member
Timișoara	Romania	319,279	Full member
Tirana	Albania	557,422	Associate member
Toulouse	France	479,638	Full member
Turin	Italy	878,074	Full member
Turku	Finland	190,935	Full member
Uppsala	Sweden	210,000	Full member
Utrecht	Netherlands	345,080	Full member
Valencia	Spain	801,456	Full member
Valladolid	Spain	299,715	Full member
Vantaa	Finland	226,160	Full member
Varna	Bulgaria	335,854	Full member
Venice	Italy	260,897	Full member
Vienna	Austria	1,899,055	Full member
Vilnius	Lithuania	536,631	Full member
Warsaw	Poland	1,764,615	Full member
Wiesbaden	Germany	290,955	Full member
Wrocław	Poland	639,258	Full member
Yerevan	Armenia	1,075,800	Associate member
Zagreb	Croatia	802,588	Full member
Zaragoza	Spain	666,880	Full member
Zürich	Switzerland	409,241	Associate member

Partners
City	State	Population
Alcobendas	Spain	116,037
Almere	Netherlands	202,764
Amiens (Note: Communauté d'agglomération Amiens Métropole.)	France	178,915
Arezzo	Italy	99,000
Beyoğlu	Turkey	254,000
Borlänge	Sweden	52,590
Bremen	Germany	527,900
Brest Métropole	France	210,000
Bruges	Belgium	118,284
Cesena	Italy	95,909
Derry-Strabane	United Kingdom	152,659
Dordrecht	Netherlands	119,115
Fuenlabrada	Spain	198,000
Grand Paris Sud	France	347,022
Grand Reims	France	298,000
Groningen	Netherlands	200,000
Guimarães	Portugal	158,124
Haarlem	Netherlands	157,000
Hagen	Germany	201,700
Heraklion	Greece	150,000
Kadıköy	Turkey	458,638
Karlstad	Sweden	87,000
Klaipėda	Lithuania	172,292
Kortrijk	Belgium	75,000
Kungsbacka	Sweden	80,000
Lahti	Finland	120,112
Le Havre	France	169,733
Leeuwarden	Netherlands	108,768
Leuven	Belgium	100,000
Linköping	Sweden	159,000
Logroño	Spain	151,113
Marousi	Greece	80,000
Matosinhos	Portugal	172,000
Metz	France	116,581
Mezitli	Turkey	180,000
Nacka	Sweden	100,000
Netwerkstad Twente	Netherlands	320,000
Osmangazi	Turkey	750,000
Ostend	Belgium	71,921
Pau	France	76,275
Pesaro	Italy	94,813
Rijeka	Croatia	128,624
Rubí	Spain	76,423
San Sebastián	Spain	186,665
Sipoo	Finland	19,235
Solna	Sweden	80,000
Saint-Nazaire	France	115,000
Stavanger	Norway	126,469
Treviso	Italy	85,760
Turkish Cypriot community of Nicosia	Cyprus (Note: Internationally recognized as part of the Republic of Cyprus, the Nicosia Turkish Municipality is based in North Nicosia which is de facto part of the unrecognized Turkish Republic of Northern Cyprus)	313,000
Umeå	Sweden	130,224
Valongo	Portugal	93,858
Wolverhampton	United Kingdom	281,434

== See also ==
- B40 Balkan Cities Network
