= Lai-Sheng Wang =

Chinese chemist (born 1961)

- 王來生
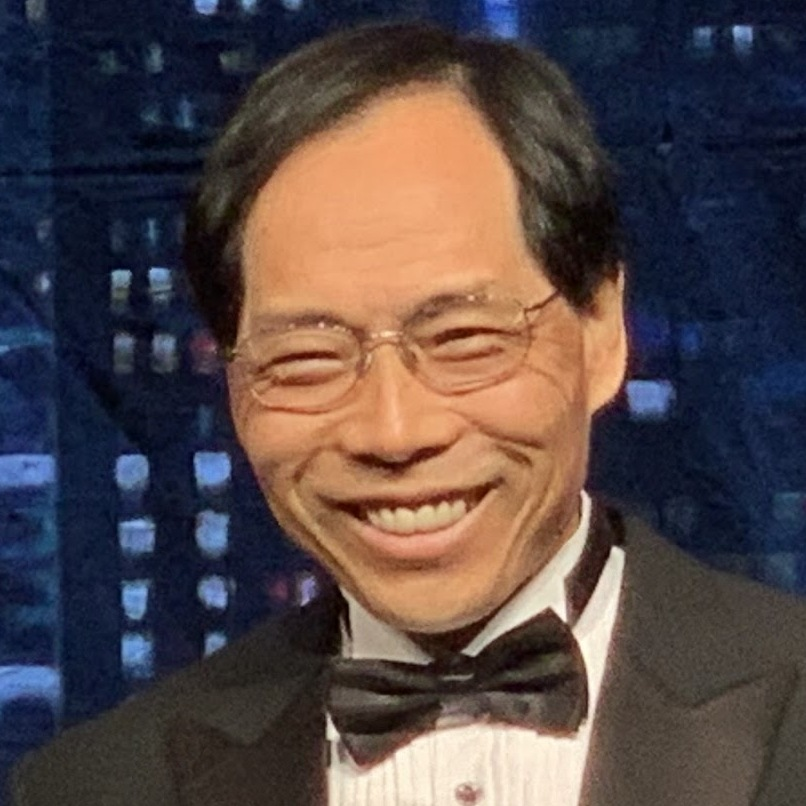
- Wang accepting the 2021 E. Bright Wilson Award
- Born: Wang Laisheng; August 1961 (age 65); Henan, China
- Education: Wuhan University; University of California, Berkeley; Rice University
- Known for: Bucky-balls, golden pyramids, borophene
- Children: Selina Wang
- Scientific career
- Fields: Experimental physical chemistry
- Workplaces: Brown University

Lai-Sheng Wang
- Traditional Chinese: 王來生
- Simplified Chinese: 王来生
Transcriptions
Standard Mandarin
- Hanyu Pinyin: Wáng Láishēng
- Wade–Giles: Wang^{2}Lai^{2}shêng^{1}

Lai-Sheng Wang (simplified Chinese: 王来生; traditional Chinese: 王來生; pinyin: Wáng Láishēng, born 1961) is a Chinese experimental physical chemist who formerly served as the chair of the Chemistry Department at Brown University. He is known for his work on atomic gold pyramids and planar boron clusters.

== Education ==
Wang obtained a B.S. degree in chemistry from Wuhan University in 1982, and a Ph.D. in chemistry from the University of California, Berkeley in 1990. He completed his postdoctoral stay at Rice University before moving to Richland, Washington in 1993 to accept a joint position between Washington State University and Pacific Northwest National Laboratory.

In 2009, he moved to Brown University, where he teaches physical chemistry and conducts research. He was named the Jesse H. and Louisa D. Sharpe Metcalf Professor of Chemistry in 2015 and chair of the Department in 2019.

== Research ==
Throughout his career, Wang has predominately studied nanoclusters and solution-phase chemistry in the gas phase, focusing on the fundamental behaviors of nanoclusters using photoelectron spectroscopy and computational techniques. With his group, he has discovered golden bucky-balls and the smallest golden pyramid, as well as aromatic clusters and planar boron clusters. His group has pioneered spectroscopic studies in the gas-phase of free multiply-charged anions and solution-phase molecules, such as metal complexes, redox species, and biologically-relevant molecules. His group has also developed ion-trap techniques to create ultracold anions that allow high resolution photoelectron spectroscopy to be performed on complex molecules.

In 2014, Wang's research team at Brown University showed that the structure of B_{36} was not only possible but highly stable. Photoelectron spectroscopy revealed a relatively simple spectrum, suggesting a symmetric cluster. Neutral B36 is the smallest boron cluster to have sixfold symmetry and a perfect hexagonal vacancy, and it can be viewed as a potential basis for extended two-dimensional boron sheets.

Wang has published over 530 articles in publications including Nature Magazine, Science, Physical Review Letters, Angewandte Chemie, and the Journal of the American Chemical Society.

== Honors and awards ==
- 1996 CAREER Award, U.S. National Science Foundation
- 1997 Westinghouse Distinguished Professor in Materials Science and Engineering, Washington State University
- 1997 Alfred P. Sloan Research Fellow
- 2003 American Physical Society Fellow
- 2005 Distinguished Faculty Award, Washington State University
- 2005 Guggenheim Fellowship
- 2006 Humboldt Senior Research Award
- 2007 Sahlin Faculty Excellence Award for Research, Scholarship and Arts, Washington State University
- 2007 American Association for the Advancement of Science Fellow
- 2014 Earle K. Plyler Prize for Molecular Spectroscopy
- 2021 E. Bright Wilson Award in Spectroscopy
- 2023 Herbert P. Broida Prize

== Affiliations ==
- American Association for the Advancement of Science
- American Chemical Society
- American Physical Society
- Materials Research Society
