= Crystal structure of boron-rich metal borides (data page) =

Chemical data page

This article contains crystal structure data used in the article crystal structure of boron-rich metal borides.

== Table I ==
Structure data for YAlB_{14}
Atom	Site	x	y	z	Occ.*	b_{iso}(Å^{2})
Y	8i	0.02511(8)	1/4	0.64217(3)	0.310(1)	Anisotropic
Al	4c	1/4	1/4	1/4	0.708(3)	Anisotropic
B1	8h	0	0.1660(1)	0.9682(1)	1	0.35(1)
B2	8h	0	0.1520(1)	0.3745(1))	1	0.39(1)
B3	8h	0	0.0882(1)	0.1704(1)	1	0.35(1)
B4	16i	0.1602(1)	0.05917(6)	0.83757(7)	1	0.34(1)
B5	16j	0.2482(1)	0.08028(6)	0.45487(8)	1	0.35(1)

- Chemical composition can be calculated as Y_{0.62}Al_{0.71}B_{14}.

Anisotropic displacement parameters for YAlB_{14}
Atom	U_{11}(Å^{2})	U_{22}(Å^{2})	U_{33}(Å^{2})	U_{13}(Å^{2})
Y	0.087(2)	0.00446(8)	0.00466(8)	−0.00045(9)
Al	0.0112(3)	0.0053(2)	0.0196(3)	0.0108(2)

== Table II ==
Structure data for YB_{62}
Atom	Site	x	y	z	Occ.*	U_{eq.}(Å^{2})
B1	96i	0	0.0374(2)	0.0594(1)	1.0	0.0101(7)
B2	96i	0	0.0759(2)	0.1171(2)	1.0	0.0118(7)
B3	96i	0	0.0387(2)	0.1809(2)	1.0	0.0115(7)
B4	96i	0	0.1486(1)	0.2418(1)	1.0	0.0098(7)
B5	96i	0	0.1855(2)	0.1715(2)	1.0	0.0112(7)
B6	192j	0.0389(1)	0.1401(1)	0.1220(1)	1.0	0.0137(6)
B7	192j	0.0395(1)	0.0816(1)	0.2291(1)	1.0	0.0120(6)
B8	192j	0.0630(1)	0.0775(1)	0.1586(1)	1.0	0.0129(6)
B9	192j	0.0635(1)	0.1455(1)	0.1948(1)	1.0	0.0137(6)
B10	192j	0.1328(3)	0.1744(3)	0.1975(3)	0.758(19)	0.0412(20)
B11	192j	0.2314(4)	0.1607(3)	0.3021(4)	0.531(14)	0.0427(24)
B12	192j	0.1733(4)	0.1273(4)	0.2581(5)	0.293(17)	0.0207(35)
B13	64g	0.2337(8)	0.2337(8)	0.2337(8)	0.076(6)	0.0395(98)
Y1	48f	0.0542(3)	0.25	0.25	0.437(9)	0.0110(9)
Y2	48f	0.0725(11)	0.25	0.25	0.110(12)	0.0414(43)

== Table III ==
Structure data for YB_{41}Si_{1.2}^{a}
Atom	Site	x	y	z	Occ.*	b_{iso}(Å^{2})
B1.1	8i	0.4362(2)	0.5491(2)	0.0938(3)	1	0.12(5)
B1.2	8i	0.4660(2)	0.4610(2)	0.1572(3)	1	0.15(5)
B1.3	4g	0.4063(3)	0.4711(3)	0	1	0.19(7)
B1.4	4g	0.4852(3)	0.4078(3)	0	1	0.14(6)
B2.1	8i	0.2326(2)	0.4909(2)	0.0981(3)	1	0.14(5)
B2.2	8i	0.2101(2)	0.3281(2)	0.0956(3)	1	0.13(5)
B2.3	8i	0.1664(2)	0.4147(2)	0.1632(3)	1	0.19(5)
B2.4	8i	0.2749(2)	0.4005(2)	0.1586(3)	1	0.13(4)
B2.5	4g	0.1293(3)	0.3702(3)	0	1	0.11(6)
B2.6	4g	0.1379(3)	0.4694(3)	0	1	0.11(6)
B2.7	4g	0.3106(3)	0.4451(3)	0	1	0.15(7)
B2.8	4g	0.2972(3)	0.3466(3)	0	1	0.20(7)
B3.1	8i	0.3793(2)	0.1879(2)	0.0975(3)	1	0.19(5)
B3.2	8i	0.5354(2)	0.2580(2)	0.0946(3)	1	0.13(5)
B3.3	8i	0.4823(2)	0.1772(2)	0.1640(3)	1	0.11(4)
B3.4	8i	0.4350(2)	0.2693(2)	0.1584(3)	1	0.12(5)
B3.5	4g	0.4501(3)	0.1247(3)	0	1	0.19(6)
B3.6	4g	0.3728(3)	0.2753(3)	0	1	0.28(7)
B3.7	4g	0.4682(3)	0.3146(3)	0	1	0.12(6)
B3.8	4g	0.5424(3)	0.1724(3)	0	1	0.14(6)
B4.1	8i	0.2006(2)	0.1543(2)	0.0880(3)	1	0.16(5)
B4.2	8i	0.1315(2)	0.0978(2)	0.1785(3)	1	0.09(4)
B4.3	8i	0.1156(2)	0.1965(2)	0.1737(3)	1	0.18(5)
B4.4	8i	0.2107(2)	0.2414(2)	0.1753(3)	1	0.15(4)
B4.5	8i	0.2905(2)	0.1676(2)	0.1833(3)	1	0.10(4)
B4.6	8i	0.2377(2)	0.0745(2)	0.1817(3)	1	0.15(4)
B4.7	8i	0.1741(2)	0.0671(2)	0.3370(3)	1	0.23(5)
B4.8	8i	0.0972(2)	0.1445(2)	0.3316(3)	1	0.15(5)
B4.9	84i	0.1508(2)	0.2379(2)	0.3301(3)	1	0.11(4)
B4.10	8i	0.2612(2)	0.2215(2)	0.3352(3)	1	0.15(4)
B4.11	8i	0.2720(2)	0.1169(2)	0.3434(3)	1	0.20(5)
B4.12	8i	0.1884(2)	0.1594(2)	0.4149(3)	1	0.28(5)
B5.1	8i	0.1150(2)	0.4078(2)	0.3354(3)	1	0.19(5)
B5.2	8i	0.1066(2)	0.3127(2)	0.4060(3)	1	0.18(5)
B5.3	8i	0.0255(2)	0.4553(2)	0.4053(3)	1	0.20(5)
B5.4	8i	0.0175(2)	0.3589(2)	0.3358(3)	1	0.18(4)
B5.5	4h	0.4628(3)	0.1121(3)	1/2	1	0.27(7)
B5.6	4h	0.1675(3)	0.3812(3)	1/2	1	0.39(7)
B5.7	4h	0.1202(3)	0.4681(3)	1/2	1	0.31(7)
B5.8	4h	0.0108(3)	0.3023(3)	1/2	1	0.28(7)
B6.1	8i	0.3311(2)	0.3858(2)	0.3061(3)	1	0.19(4)
B6.2	8i	0.3530(2)	0.4752(2)	0.4064(3)	1	0.35(5)
B6.3	8i	0.4294(2)	0.4214(2)	0.3063(3)	1	0.14(4)
B6.4	8i	0.4150(2)	0.3223(2)	0.3052(3)	1	0.18(4)
B6.5	8i	0.5013(2)	0.3652(2)	0.4046(3)	1	0.20(4)
B6.6	8i	0.3268(2)	0.2925(2)	0.4058(3)	1	0.43(5)
Si6.7^{b}	4h	0.2784(3)	0.3866(3)	1/2	0.575(6)	0.22(6)
B6.7^{b}	4h	0.2785(13)	0.3961(11)	1/2	0.425(6)	0.22(6)
Si6.8^{c}	4h	0.4429(3)	0.2787(3)	1/2	0.478(6)	0.17(7)
B6.8^{c}	4h	0.4492(11)	0.2818(12)	1/2	0.522(6)	0.17(7)
Si6.9^{d}	4h	0.4655(3)	0.4626(3)	1/2	0.440(6)	0.17(8)
B6.9^{d}	4h	0.4589(9)	0.4537(7)	1/2	0.560(60)	0.17(8)
B7.1	8i	0.3911(4)	0.3747(4)	0.1181(8)	1	0.30^{e}
B7.2	8i	0.3182(17)	0.2183(16)	0.502(31)	0.46(1)	0.30^{e}
B7.3	4g	0.4569(3)	0.0212(2)	0	0.23(1)	0.30^{e}
B7.4	4g	0.0766(4)	0.1555(6)	0	0.29(1)	0.30^{e}
B7.5	4g	0.1438(11)	0.2507(11)	0	0.18(1)	0.30^{e}
B7.6	4g	0.2552(10)	0.2629(9)	0	0.43(1)	0.30^{e}
B7.7	4h	0.2054(15)	0.0230(14)	1/2	0.08(1)	0.30^{e}
Y	8i	0.39628(1)	0.05199(1)	0.22964(3)	1	0.22^{f}
Si	4h	0.34402(8)	0.07974(8)	1/2	0.798(6)	0.29^{f}

^{a} The number n in the atom designation Bn,n refers to the B_{12}-nth icosahedron to which the Bn,n belongs. Si6.n and B6.n belong to the B_{12}Si_{3} unit.

^{b,c,d} The Si and B sites are in the same interstice, which is assumed to be fully occupied by both Si and B atoms with occupancies of Occ.(Si) and Occ.(B), respectively, where Occ.(Si)+Occ.(B) = 1. Position of the boron atom was adjusted independently by fixing the thermal parameters at the same value as for the Si atom in the same interstice.

^{e} The temperature factor is fixed at this value.

^{f} Equivalent isotropic temperature factor. It was calculated from the relation B_{eq.} = 4/3(a^{2}β_{11} + b^{2}β_{22} + c^{2}β_{33}).

== Table IVa ==
Structure data for homologous compounds.

a. Structure data of ScB_{15.5}CN
Atom	Site	x	y	z	Occ.*	U_{eq.}(nm^{2}×10^{3})
Sc	2d	1/3	2/3	0.4426(1)	0.93(1)	16.1(4)
B1	6i	0.4909(4)	0.5091(2)	0.2177(2)	1	3.8(4)
B2	6i	0.5580(1)	0.4420(2)	0.0612(1)	1	3.5(4)
B3	6i	0.7737(2)	0.2263(2)	0.3175(2)	1	4.5(4)
B4	6i	0.8383(4)	0.1617(2)	0.1611(2)	1	4.2(4)
B5	6i	0.8945(2)	0.1055(2)	0.4331(2)	1	4.8(4)
B6	1a	0	0	0	1	5(1)
C	2c	0	0	0.1338(3)	1	4.1(9)
N	2d	1/3	2/3	0.2446(3)	1	6.1(8)

- The sum of those values was fixed at 1.0.

== Table IVb ==
b. Structure data of YB_{22}C_{2}N
Atom	Site	x	y	z	Occ.*	b_{iso}(Å^{3})
Y	6c	0	0	0.349(2)	0.74(4)	0.62(5)
B1	18h	0.223(6)	−0.223(6)	0.442(3)	1.0	2.37(0)
B2	18h	0.557(2)	0.442(8)	0.349(4)	1.0	2.37(0)
B3	18h	0.151(8)	0.303(6)	0.404(3)	1.0	2.37(0)
B4	18h	0.438(0)	0.562(0)	0.379(0)	1.0	2.37(0)
B5	6c	2/3	1/3	0.454(2)	1.01(4)	2.50(4)
B6	18h	0.499(6)	0.500(4)	0.417(5)	1.0	2.37(0)
B7	18h	0.102(1)	−0.102(1)	0.468(5)	1.0	3.37(0)
B8	18h	0.334(9)	0.167(4)	0.494(7)	1.0	2.37(0)
C1	6c	2/3	1/3	0.485(8)	1.16(4)	3.19(0)
C2	6c	2/3	1/3	0.423(2)	0.99(6)	3.19(0)
N	6c	0	0	0.401(3)	0.84(0)	0.95(8)

== Table IVc ==
c. Structure data of YB_{28.5}C_{4}
Atom	Site	x	y	z	Occ.*	U_{eq.}(nm^{2}×10^{3})
Y1	6c	0	0	0.3200(1)	0.83(9)	7(1)
C2	6c	0	0	0.2787(2)	1.12(1)	6(3)
C3	6c	2/3	1/3	0.2129(2)	1.06(2)	5(3)
C4	6c	2/3	1/3	0.2639(2)	1.05(3)	11(3)
B5	6c	2/3	1/3	0.2385(3)	1.12(1)	17(4)
C6	6c	1/3	−1/3	0.1922(2)	1.08(5)	11(3)
B7	3b	1/3	−1/3	1/6	1.08(0)	13(6)
B8	18h	0.1096(8)	−0.1096(8)	0.2265(1)	1.0	2(1)
B9	18h	0.2136(17)	0.1068(8)	0.3677(1)	1.0	4(1)
B10	18h	0.2177(18)	0.1089(9)	0.1780(1)	1.0	3(1)
B11	18h	0.1703(8)	−0.1703(8)	0.1968(1)	1.0	3(1)
B12	18h	0.2255(8)	0.4511(17)	0.2498(1)	1.0	3(1)
B13	18h	0.4631(17)	0.2316(8)	0.3462(1)	1.0	3(1)
B14	18h	0.1632(8)	0.3263(17)	0.2795(1)	1.0	3(1)
B15	18h	0.5030(9)	0.4970(9)	0.2690(1)	1.0	4(2)
B16	18h	0.3422(17)	0.1711(8)	0.2077(1)	1.0	4(1)
BC17	6c	0	0	0.2506(4)	0.51(9)	6(8)

== Table Va ==
Structure data for Y_{x}B_{12}C_{0.33}Si_{3.0} (x=0.68)
Atom	Site	x	y	z	Occ.*	U_{eq.}(nm^{2}×10^{3})
Y	9e	1/6	1/3	1/3	0.68(1)	6.1(1)
B1	36i	0.4916(1)	0.1556(1)	0.1353(1)	1.0	4.5(1)
B2	36i	0.3671(1)	0.0400(1)	0.2181(1)	1.0	4.6(1)
B3	18h	0.4838(2)	0.2419(1)	0.2307(1)	1.0	7.4(2)
B4	18h	0.2900(2)	0.1450(1)	0.2697(1)	1.0	5.1(2)
C3	6c	2/3	1/3	0.2666(12)	0.58(5)*	2.9(5)
Si1	6c	1/3	2/3	0.2379(0)	1.0	2.7(1)
Si2	18h	0.4648(0)	0.5352(0)	0.2730(0)	1.0	4.1(1)
Si3	6c	2/3	1/3	0.2917(3)	0.42(2)*	1.1(2)

- The sum of those values was fixed at 1.0.

== Table Vb ==
Interatomic distances between the listed sites of Y_{x}B_{12}C_{0.33}Si_{3.0}
Atoms	Distance (Å)	Atoms	Distance (Å)
C3-B3	1.703(7)	C3-C3	2.198
Si3-B3	1.887(3)	Si3-C3	0.413
C3-Si3	1.786(24)	Si3-Si3	1.373(10)

== Table VI ==
Structure data for ScB_{19+x}Si_{y} (x=0.7, y=0.18)^{a}
Atom	Site	x	y	z	Occ.	U_{eq.}(nm^{2}×10^{3})
B1	8b	−0.1228	0.2389	0.1261	1.0	5.06
B(2)	8b	−0.0333	0.1355	0.2097	1.0	5.5
B(3)	8b	−0.0428	0.3116	0.2294	1.0	5.18
B(4)	8b	−0.0398	0.3917	0.1159	1.0	5.36
B(5)	8b	−0.0113	0.1129	0.0786	1.0	6.27
B(6)	8b	−0.0273	0.272	0.0277	1.0	5.24
B(7)	8b	0.1154	0.2258	0.244	1.0	5.93
B(8)	8b	0.1027	0.3902	0.192	1.0	5.46
B(9)	8b	0.1265	0.1058	0.1548	1.0	5.73
B(10)	8b	0.127	0.1951	0.0453	1.0	5.04
B(11)	8b	0.1142	0.3624	0.0645	1.0	5.16
B(12)	8b	0.2093	0.2618	0.1403	1.0	5.22
B(13)	8b	0.3187	0.0588	0.3634	1.0	9.81
B(14)	8b	0.3933	0.2069	0.326	1.0	8.95
B(15)	8b	0.2135	0.1978	0.3449	1.0	10.19
B(16)	8b	0.47	0.1142	0.4131	1.0	6.57
B(17)	8b	0.4662	0.2887	0.4239	1.0	6.27
B(18)	8b	0.1903	0.0946	0.4509	0.652	9.15
B(19)	8b	0.2721	0.1861	0.5453	1.0	6.32
B(20)	8b	0.3529	0.042	0.4933	1.0	6.37
B(21)	8b	0.4445	0.1865	0.526	1.0	8.9
B(22)	4a	0.3354	0.3354	0.5	1.0	8.92
B(23)	4a	0.0347	0.0347	0.5	1.0	10.25
B(24)	8b	0.3133	0.3367	0.381	0.631	14.73
Sc(1)	8b	0.2964	0.4857	0.1316	0.811	4.73
Sc(2)	8b	0.2981	0.375	0.2968	0.194	16.22
Sc(3)	8b	0.0849	0.0107	0.3215	0.128	5.66
Si	8b	0.1758	0.0037	0.4227	0.203	10.09

^{a} Obtained by structure analysis.

== Table VII ==
Structure data for ScB_{17}C_{0.25}.
Atom	Site	x	y	z	Occ.	U_{eq.}(nm^{2}×10^{3})
Sc	12o	0.4251(1)	0.8502(1)	0.7496(2)	1.0	5.8(4)
B1	12p	0.6699(4)	0.7362(4)	0.0	1.0	3.2(9)
B2	12p	0.5300(4)	0.6629(4)	0.0	1.0	6.4(9)
B3	24r	0.5985(3)	0.7380(3)	0.8351(4)	1.0	3.7(7)
B4	12o	0.1419(7)	0.2838(5)	0.9011(6)	1.0	6.6(9)
B5	12o	0.5242(4)	0.2621(2)	0.0986(4)	1.0	4.3(9)
B6	4h	1/3	2/3	0.8288(10)	1.0	5(2)
B7	4h	1/3	2/3	0.6165(10)	1.0	5(2)
B8	24r	0.3077(3)	0.9274(3)	0.6661(4)	1.0	4.4(7)
B9	12g	0.4395(4)	0.0	0.5984(6)	1.0	5.3(8)
B10	12q	0.5375(5)	0.6562(5)	1/2	1.0	6(1)
B11	12n	0.7571(4)	0.0	0.5995(6)	1.0	5.0(9)
B12	12q	0.2266(5)	0.3405(4)	1/2	1.0	6(1)
B13	12o	0.0771(2)	0.1542(5)	0.8347(7)	1.0	4(1)
B14	12n	0.1327(4)	0.0	0.6664(7)	1.0	8(1)
B/C15	6l	0.4694(3)	0.9388(7)	0.0	B/C=0.73/0.27	8(1)
B/C16	6m	0.3944(6)	0.7888(7)	1/2	B/C=0.80/0.20	13(1)
B17	6l	0.0391(12)	0.0782(24)	0.0	0.53	45(8)
B18	6m	0.0379(10)	0.0758(10)	1/2	0.67	44(6)

== Table VIII ==
Structure data for Sc_{0.83−x}B_{10.0−y}C_{0.17+y}Si_{0.083−z} (x = 0.030, y = 0.36 and z = 0.026).
Atom	Site	x	y	z	Occ.	U_{eq.}(nm^{2}×10^{3})
B1	48h	0.0613(2)	0.0613(2)	0.6638(2)	1.0	6.62
B2	48h	0.1209(2)	0.1209(2)	0.6832(2)	1.0	7.03
B3	48h	0.0864(2)	0.0864(2)	0.5206(2)	1.0	7.83
B4	48h	0.1478(2)	0.1478(2)	0.5438(2)	1.0	8.18
B5	48h	0.1899(2)	0.1899(2)	0.9098(2)	1.0	8.17
B,C6	48h	0.2219(2)	0.2219(2)	0.8378(2)	B/C=0.58/0.42	8.38
B7	48h	0.1068(2)	0.1068(2)	0.8320(2)	1.0	5.93
B8	48h	0.1410(2)	0.1410(2)	0.7596(2)	1.0	6.85
B9	48h	0.3018(2)	0.3018(2)	0.4030(3)	1.0	13.28
B10	48h	0.2191(2)	0.2191(2)	0.9796(3)	1.0	11.33
B11	48h	0.7816(2)	0.7816(2)	0.1217(3)	1.0	13.61
B12	48h	0.3019(2)	0.3019(2)	0.4927(3)	1.0	10.07
B13	96i	0.7693(2)	0.9520(2)	0.1663(2)	1.0	14.96
B14	48h	0.0485(2)	0.0485(2)	0.8212(3)	1.0	7.51
B15	48h	0.0340(2)	0.0340(2)	0.1403(3)	1.0	15.19
B16	96i	0.7875(2)	0.9762(2)	0.0845(2)	1.0	16.48
B17	48h	0.0326(2)	0.0326(2)	0.7384(3)	1.0	14.68
B,C18	16e	0.3494(3)	0.3494(3)	0.3494(3)	B/C=0.51/0.49	9.68
B,C19	16e	0.0623(3)	0.0623(3)	0.0623(3)	B/C=0.85/0.15	12.11
B,C20	16e	0.4447(2)	0.4447(2)	0.4447(2)	B/C=0.73/0.27	8.90
C1	16e	0.1947(3)	0.1947(3)	0.1947(3)	1.0	15.45
Si1	4a	0.2500(0)	0.2500(0)	0.2500(0)	1.0	16.19
Si2	4a	0.5000(0)	0.5000(0)	0.5000(0)	0.38	37.82
Sc1	16e	0.9409(04)	0.9409(04)	0.9409(04)	1.0	8.9^{a}
Sc2	16e	0.1270(07)	0.1270(07)	0.1270(07)	0.99	32.99^{a}
Sc3	48h	0.0689(04)	0.0689(04)	0.3216(04)	0.95	11.05^{a}

Atom	U_{11}	U_{22}	U_{33}	U_{23}	U_{13}	U_{12}
Sc1	8.96	8.96	8.96	−0.91	−0.91	−0.91
Sc2	32.99	32.99	32.99	−9.42	−9.42	−9.42
Sc3	12 .25	12.25	8.65	−0.33	−0.33	−0.12

^{a} Anisotropic thermal factors are applied to Sc sites, and U_{eq} (one-third of the trace of the orthogonalized U_{ij} tensor) is listed in these columns.

== Table IX ==
Structure data for Sc_{4.5−x}B_{57−y+z}C_{3.5−z} (x =0.27, y = 1.1, z = 0.2).
Atom	Site	x	y	z	Occ.	U_{eq.}(nm^{2}×10^{3})
B1	8i	0.3347(1)	0.2050(2)	0.6241(2)	1.0	5.8(4)
B2	8i	0.1410(2)	−0.1034(2)	0.2728(2)	1.0	6.6(4)
B3	8i	0.2612(1)	0.2836(2)	0.6215(2)	1.0	5.8(4)
B4	8i	0.4280(1)	0.2589(2)	0.6235(2)	1.0	6.0(4)
B5	8i	0.3484(2)	0.2963(2)	0.5582(2)	1.0	5.3(4)
B6	8i	0.2823(1)	0.2312(2)	0.7301(2)	1.0	5.4(4)
B7	8i	0.3070(1)	0.3795(2)	0.6211(2)	1.0	5.1(4)
B8	8i	0.4055(1)	0.3652(2)	0.6226(2)	1.0	5.3(4)
B9	8i	0.3898(1)	0.2167(2)	0.7324(2)	1.0	5.8(4)
B10	8i	0.3476(2)	0.3034(2)	0.7929(2)	1.0	6.4(4)
B11	8i	0.2682(1)	0.3424(2)	0.7236(2)	1.0	5.1(4)
B12	8i	0.4371(2)	0.3209(2)	0.7295(2)	1.0	5.9(4)
B13	8i	0.4587(2)	−0.0243(2)	0.8542(2)	1.0	7.4(4)
B14	8i	0.3552(1)	−0.0209(2)	0.7027(2)	1.0	5.8(4)
B15	8i	0.3940(1)	0.0421(2)	0.7953(2)	1.0	5.4(4)
B16	8i	0.3019(2)	−0.0052(2)	0.8126(2)	1.0	6.5(4)
B17	8i	0.6125(2)	0.1769(2)	0.8143(2)	1.0	6.6(4)
B18	8i	0.5250(2)	0.1195(2)	0.7960(2)	1.0	5.9(4)
B19	8i	0.0752(2)	0.3872(2)	0.0943(2)	1.0	6.2(4)
B20	8i	0.6791(2)	0.1048(2)	0.8810(2)	1.0	6.3(4)
B21	8i	0.4539(2)	−0.0273(2)	0.7328(2)	1.0	5.7(4)
B22	8i	0.5951(2)	0.1197(2)	0.7028(2)	1.0	6.4(4)
B23	8i	0.3716(2)	−0.0065(2)	0.9054(2)	1.0	6.7(4)
B24	8i	0.1886(2)	0.3891(2)	0.2408(2)	1.0	6.1(4)
B25	4h	0.5570(2)	0.3161(2)	0.5000(0)	1.0	4.8(6)
B26	8i	0.5896(2)	0.1702(2)	0.6004(2)	1.0	6.1(4)
B27	4h	0.4658(2)	−0.1389(2)	0.5000(0)	1.0	5.9(6)
B28	8i	0.6782(1)	0.2169(2)	0.5618(2)	1.0	5.3(4)
B29	4h	0.3651(2)	−0.1350(2)	0.5000(0)	1.0	3.4(6)
B30	8i	0.5115(1)	0.2348(2)	0.5630(2)	1.0	5.4(4)
C31	4h	0.6546(2)	0.3025(2)	0.5000(0)	1.0	7.3(5)
B32	8i	0.6020(2)	0.2784(2)	0.6021(2)	1.0	5.7(4)
C33	4h	0.1831(2)	0.0261(2)	0.5000(0)	1.0	6.2(5)
C34	4h	0.3222(2)	−0.0486(2)	0.5000(0)	1.0	8.9(6)
B35	8i	0.2270(2)	0.0603(2)	0.6016(2)	1.0	6.3(4)
B36	8i	0.7354(1)	0.5437(2)	0.4379(2)	1.0	6.0(4)
B37	4h	0.7189(2)	0.3766(2)	0.5000(0)	1.0	6.4(6)
B38	4h	0.3734(2)	0.0459(2)	0.5000(0)	1.0	6.8(6)
B39	8i	0.3187(1)	0.0127(2)	0.6004(2)	1.0	5.6(4)
B40	8i	0.3098(2)	0.1178(2)	0.5629(2)	1.0	6.2(4)
B41	8i	0.4507(1)	0.4330(2)	0.5607(2)	1.0	5.2(4)
B42	8i	0.0390(2)	0.0341(2)	0.6004(2)	1.0	6.1(4)
C43	4h	0.5297(2)	0.4086(2)	0.5000(0)	1.0	7.7(6)
B44	4h	0.0943(2)	0.0123(2)	0.5000(0)	1.0	5.9(6)
B45	8i	0.2050(2)	0.1636(2)	0.7716(2)	1.0	6.0(4)
B46	8i	0.0681(2)	0.1263(2)	0.1059(2)	1.0	8.9(5)
B47	8i	0.6154(1)	0.3328(2)	0.7019(2)	1.0	5.3(4)
B48	8i	0.0749(2)	0.0661(2)	0.7017(2)	1.0	6.7(4)
B49	8i	0.1163(2)	0.2096(2)	0.8164(2)	1.0	6.3(4)
B50	8i	0.0317(2)	0.1444(2)	0.7735(2)	1.0	6.1(4)
B51	8i	0.0415(2)	0.0348(2)	0.1842(2)	1.0	7.5(4)
B52	8i	0.1772(1)	0.0777(2)	0.7000(2)	1.0	5.7(4)
B53	8i	0.1314(2)	−0.0047(2)	0.2313(2)	1.0	9.2(4)
B54	8i	0.1279(2)	0.0314(2)	0.1094(2)	1.0	18.9(6)
B55	8i	0.2129(2)	0.0524(2)	0.1870(2)	1.0	7.7(4)
B56	8i	0.1744(2)	0.1361(2)	0.1069(2)	1.0	9.2(5)
B57	8i	0.7574(2)	0.1419(2)	0.9408(2)	1.0	9.6(5)
B58	4g	0.8776(2)	0.2582(3)	0.0000(0)	1.0	9.5(6)
B59	8i	0.8460(2)	0.1852(2)	0.9102(2)	1.0	7.4(5)
B60	4g	0.2774(2)	0.2621(3)	0.0000(0)	1.0	10.1(7)
B61	4g	0.4196(3)	0.3404(3)	0.0000(0)	1.0	17.6(8)
B62	4g	0.1589(4)	0.8983(4)	0.0000(0)	0.58	6.0(16)
C/B63	8i	0.4300(1)	0.1383(1)	0.7908(2)	C/B=0.80/0.20	6.2(4)
B64	4g	0.1305(4)	−0.0080(4)	0.0000(0)	0.78	14.9(15)
C65	4h	0.5219(2)	−0.0431(2)	0.5000(0)	1.0	12.6(6)
B66	4g	0.9242(3)	0.3500(3)	0.0000(0)	1.0	11.9(7)
B67	4g	0.2231(2)	0.1635(2)	0.0000(0)	1.0	8.6(6)
B68	4g	0.0246(2)	0.3536(2)	0.0000(0)	1.0	6.8(6)
B69	4g	0.5216(2)	0.3482(3)	0.0000(0)	1.0	8.3(6)
B70	4g	0.8751(2)	0.4428(3)	0.0000(0)	1.0	10.3(7)
B/Si71	8i	0.1440(4)	0.9256(4)	0.0604(4)	B+Si=0.30 (B/Si=0.9/0.1)	6.4(10)
Sc1	8i	0.47761(2)	0.24988(3)	0.88052(3)	0.97	6.0(1)^{a}
Sc2	2a	0.50000(0)	0.50000(0)	0.00000(0)	0.96	14.9(3)^{a}
Sc3	8i	0.44587(3)	0.10615(3)	0.63668(3)	0.97	6.2(1)^{a}
Sc4	8i	0.31793(3)	0.15473(3)	0.87857(3)	0.97	7.1(1)^{a}
Sc5	4g	0.13723(4)	0.27037(4)	0.00000(0)	0.96	8.8(2)^{a}
Sc6	4g	0.24837(5)	0.00566(5)	0.00000(0)	0.90	9.3(2)^{a}
Sc7	2c	0.50000(0)	0.00000(0)	0.00000(0)	0.61	8.3(4)^{a}

Atom	U_{11}	U_{22}	U_{33}	U_{23}	U_{13}	U_{12}
Sc1	5.5(2)	7.6(2)	4.9(2)	−0.8(2)	0.2(1)	0.4(2)
Sc2	14.2(5)	15.2(5)	15.2(5)	0.00	0.00	4.9(4)
Sc3	7.4(2)	5.6(2)	5.5(2)	−0.3(1)	0.3(2)	1.2(1)
Sc4	4.4(2)	11.5(2)	5.4(2)	0.1(2)	0.7(1)	−0.3(2)
Sc5	5.8(3)	11.2(3)	9.5(3)	0.00	0.00	3.0(2)
Sc6	10.3(3)	8.3(3)	9.4(3)	0.00	0.00	−2.6(3)
Sc7	11.3(7)	10.7(7)	2.9(6)	0.00	0.00	−4.6(5)

^{a} Anisotropic thermal factors are applied to Sc sites, and U_{eq} (one-third of the trace of the orthogonalized U_{ij} tensor) is listed in these columns.

== Table X ==
Structure data for Sc_{3.67−x}B_{41.4−y−z}C_{0.67+z}Si_{0.33−w} (x=0.52, y=1.42, z=1.17 and w=0.02).
Atom	Site	x	y	z	Occ.	U_{eq.}(nm^{2}×10^{3})
B1	6n	0.8073(5)	0.4037(3)	0.0812(3)	1.0	6.8(10)
B2	6n	0.0650(5)	0.5325(2)	0.1400(2)	1.0	6.0(9)
B3	6n	0.9269(5)	0.4634(2)	0.0374(2)	1.0	4.4(9)
B4	6n	0.9436(5)	0.4718(3)	0.1852(3)	1.0	6.9(10)
B5	12o	0.8402(4)	0.3568(3)	0.1453(2)	1.0	7.1(7)
B6	12o	0.9843(3)	0.3894(3)	0.1412(2)	1.0	6.0(7)
B7	12o	0.0316(3)	0.4545(3)	0.0749(2)	1.0	5.7(7)
B8	12o	0.8989(4)	0.3458(4)	0.0781(2)	1.0	7.1(7)
B9	6n	0.1969(5)	0.5984(3)	0.1645(3)	1.0	8.0(10)
B10	6n	0.2446(5)	0.6223(3)	0.2375(3)	1.0	8.2(11)
B11	6n	0.2920(2)	0.5839(5)	0.1205(2)	1.0	5.3(9)
B12	6n	0.2647(3)	0.5294(5)	0.1913(2)	1.0	5.7(9)
B13	6n	0.2671(59)	0.2671(5)	0.3155(3)	1.0	8.3(10)
B14	6n	0.8217(3)	0.1784(3)	0.3748(3)	1.0	12.2(11)
B15	6n	0.7742(3)	0.2258(3)	0.2397(2)	1.0	6.1(9)
B16	12o	0.7213(4)	0.0679(4)	0.3317(2)	1.0	10.4(8)
B17	12o	0.8736(4)	0.3358(4)	0.2828(2)	1.0	8.9(7)
B18	6n	0.7304(3)	0.2697(3)	0.2990(3)	1.0	12.0(12)
B19	12o	0.9027(4)	0.2288(4)	0.2599(2)	1.0	8.7(7)
B20	12o	0.8261(5)	0.3023(5)	0.3556(2)	1.0	17.5(10)
B/C21	6n	0.0808(5)	0.0808(5)	0.3880(2)	B/C=0.55/0.45	6.7(9)
B22	6n	0.0675(3)	0.0675(3)	0.3478(2)	1.0	6.8(10)
B23	6n	0.9185(5)	0.0408(2)	0.2783(2)	1.0	5.8(9)
B24	6n	0.9333(3)	0.1334(5)	0.3221(2)	1.0	6.0(10)
B/C25	6l	0.3352(5)	0.5516(5)	0.0	B/C=0.55/0.45	6.8(10)
B26	12o	0.3193(3)	0.4403(4)	0.0374(2)	1.0	5.8(7)
B27	6n	0.1829(2)	0.3658(5)	0.0603(2)	1.0	4.2(9)
B28	6l	0.2238(5)	0.3231(5)	0.0	1.0	5.4(9)
B29	6n	0.2548(3)	0.5096(5)	0.0612(3)	1.0	6.0(9)
B30	12o	0.1777(4)	0.4848(4)	0.3452(2)	1.0	8.9(7)
B31	6n	0.2658(3)	0.5316(6)	0.5902(3)	1.0	11.8(11)
B32	6n	0.1323(3)	0.2646(5)	0.3660(3)	1.0	7.8(10)
B33	6n	0.1854(3)	0.3708(5)	0.3161(3)	1.0	7.7(10)
B34	12o	0.0915(4)	0.3082(4)	0.4271(2)	1.0	8.7(7)
B35	12o	0.0677(4)	0.3465(4)	0.3582(2)	1.0	9.6(7)
B36	12o	0.1183(5)	0.4431(5)	0.4173(2)	1.0	15.6(9)
B37	6n	0.2096(3)	0.7905(3)	0.4609(3)	1.0	9.7(11)
B/C38	6m	0.0027(5)	0.1179(5)	0.5	B/C=0.65/0.35	6.8(9)
B39	6m	0.7666(5)	0.1089(5)	0.5	1.0	6.9(10)
B40	12o	0.9869(4)	0.2146(4)	0.4628(2)	1.0	7.4(7)
B/C41	6n	0.9211(2)	0.1578(5)	0.4421(2)	B/C=0.45/0.55	7.1(9)
B42	6n	0.8514(3)	0.1486(3)	0.4387(3)	1.0	6.7(9)
B43	6l	0.2387(5)	0.2133(5)	0.0	1.0	6.4(10)
B44	12o	0.8843(3)	0.2383(3)	0.0392(2)	1.0	6.0(7)
B45	3j	0.1431(7)	0.0716(3)	0.0	1.0	3.3(13)
B46	6n	0.2359(5)	0.1180(2)	0.0579(2)	1.0	4.6(9)
B47	6n	0.1969(3)	0.3938(6)	0.1835(3)	1.0	12.4(12)
B48	6n	0.1543(3)	0.3086(5)	0.1262(2)	1.0	6.0(10)
B49	12o	0.0178(4)	0.2465(4)	0.2240(2)	1.0	9.9(8)
B50	6n	0.0872(2)	0.1745(5)	0.2267(2)	1.0	6.6(9)
B51	12o	0.0563(4)	0.3250(4)	0.1626(2)	1.0	8.7(7)
B52	6n	0.1530(3)	0.3060(6)	0.2517(3)	1.0	13.3(12)
B53	12o	0.1623(3)	0.1884(3)	0.1601(2)	1.0	5.9(7)
B54	6m	0.4507(8)	0.3567(8)	0.5	1.0	27.0(18)
B55	12o	0.4300(9)	0.9827(9)	0.4547(4)	0.87	43.8(29)
B56	6n	0.5907(5)	0.4093(5)	0.3925(5)	0.66	17.7(32)
B57	6n	0.8050(13)	0.4025(7)	0.4762(6)	0.51	16.9(40)
B58	12o	0.5007(9)	0.3781(9)	0.4206(5)	0.44	12.2(28)
B59	6n	0.8881(16)	0.4440(8)	0.4595(8)	0.55	30.9(53)
C60	2i	0.6667	0.3333	0.7126(5)	1.0	15.9(21)
B61	1a	0.0	0.0	0.0	1.0	10.5(27)
B62	6n	0.1877(5)	0.5939(3)	0.3066(3)	1.0	9.4(11)
C63	6n	0.7421(2)	0.2579(2)	0.1798(2)	1.0	8.6(9)
B/C64	6n	0.9344(5)	0.4672(2)	0.2578(2)	B/C=0.57/0.43	6.2(10)
B65	6n	0.9172(3)	0.0828(3)	0.1237(3)	1.0	6.1(9)
B66	1f	0.6667	0.3333	0.5	1.0	43.4(68)
B/C67	2h	0.3333	0.6667	0.5774(5)	B/C=0.71/0.29	10.5(22)
B68	2i	0.6667	0.3333	0.0639(4)	1.0	5.0(16)
B69	2h	0.3333	0.6667	0.3006(8)	0.49	0.0(44)
Si1	2i	0.6667	0.3333	0.3919(2)	0.87	30.7(16)
Si2	2i	0.6667	0.3333	0.2078(1)	1.0	5.0(5)
Sc1	2g	0.0	0.0	0.17777(8)	0.98	5.5(4)^{a}
Sc2	3j	0.74237(6)	0.74237(6)	0.0	0.95	7.0(4)^{a}
Sc3	6n	0.07873(4)	0.07873(4)	0.06563(4)	0.96	4.5(2)^{a}
Sc4	12o	0.07726(8)	0.43056(8)	0.24776(3)	0.87	9.4(2)^{a}
Sc5	6n	0.82732(5)	0.82732(5)	0.14302(6)	0.96	19.5(4)^{a}
Sc6	6n	0.50007(6)	0.50007(6)	0.35580(6)	0.91	14.4(3)^{a}
Sc7	3k	0.40577(10)	0.40577(10)	0.5	0.88	31.1(9)^{a}
Sc8	6n	0.74848(9)	0.25152(9)	0.45210(9)	0.49	6.3(5)^{a}

Atom	U_{11}	U_{22}	U_{33}	U_{23}	U_{13}	U_{12}
Sc1	4.7(5)	4.7(5)	7.1(8)	0.0	0.0	2.4(3)
Sc2	8.5(6)	8.5(6)	7.3(6)	0.0	0.0	6.8(6)
Sc3	4.6(3)	4.6(3)	4.1(4)	0.2(2)	0.2(2)	2.1(4)
Sc4	7.0(4)	8.5(4)	11.6(3)	4.2(3)	1.4(3)	3.1(2)
Sc5	26.9(6)	26.9(6)	18.2(6)	2.8(2)	2.8(2)	23.6(7)
Sc6	13.6(5)	13.6(5)	16.4(6)	0.1(2)	0.1(2)	7.1(5)
Sc7	15.0(9)	15.0(9)	66.7(21)	0.0	0.0	10.3(9)
Sc8	4.9(7)	4.9(7)	7.9(9)	0.8(3)	0.8(3)	1.7(7)

^{a} Anisotropic thermal factors are applied to Sc sites, and U_{eq} (one-third of the trace of the orthogonalized U_{ij} tensor) is listed in these columns.
