= 2019 Euro Tour season =

Nine-ball pool season of events

The 2019 Euro Tour Season was a professional pool series of events on the Euro Tour held in 2019. The season featured six tournaments for both men and five for women, with the first being the Leende Open and the last being the Antalya Open.

== Calendar ==
| Event | Dates | Location | Men's | | | Women's | | | Ref |
| Event | Dates | Location | Winner | Runner-up | Score | Winner | Runner-up | Score | Ref |
|---|---|---|---|---|---|---|---|---|---|
| Leende Open | 7–10 Feb | Leende, Austria | Joshua Filler | Ruslan Chinakhov | 9–7 | No event | | | |
| Treviso Open | 8–11 May | Treviso, Italy | Konrad Juszczyszyn | Ivar Saris | 9–6 | Kristina Tkach | Marharyta Fefilava | 7–5 | |
| Austria Open | 13–16 June | St Johann im Pongau, Austria | Eklent Kaçi | Joshua Filler | 9–6 | Jasmine Ouschan | Marharyta Fefilava | 7–1 | |
| Veldhoven Open | 1–4 Aug | Veldhoven, Netherlands | Mario He | Denis Grabe | 9–2 | Jasmine Ouschan | Melanie Suessenguth | 7–4 | |
| Klagenfurt Open | 11–14 Oct | Klagenfurt, Austria | Alexander Kazakis | Marc Bijsterbosch | 9–8 | Oliwia Czuprynska | Marharyta Fefilava | 7–5 | |
| Antalya Open | 7–10 Nov | Antalya, Turkey | Denis Grabe | Eklent Kaçi | 9–2 | Oliwia Zalewska | Tina Vogelmann | 7–6 | |

== Rankings ==
Rankings for the events featured points awarded for players final positions in events with the following scores:

| Position | Points |
|---|---|
| Winner | 550 |
| Runner-up | 480 |
| Semi-finalist | 420 |
| Quarter-finalist | 370 |
| 9th | 330 |
| 17th | 300 |
| 33rd | 275 |
| 49th | 230 |
| 65th | 200 |
| 97th | 180 |
| 129th | 160 |

=== Men's ===
Below is a list of the 50 players in terms of ranking points for the 2019 season. Rankings for the Euro Tour consist of the last seven tournaments, so the final event of 2018 – the 2018 Treviso Open is included. Joshua Filler finished the season as the number one rated player, finishing as a quarter-finalist or better in five of the six events.

| Rank | Name | Nation | Treviso (2018) | | Leende | | Treviso | | Austria | | Veldhoven | | Klagenfurt | | Antalya | | Min | Total |
| Rank | Name | Nation | Pos | Points | Pos | Pts | Pos | Pts | Pos | Pts | Pos | Pts | Pos | Pts | Pos | Pts | Min | Total |
|---|---|---|---|---|---|---|---|---|---|---|---|---|---|---|---|---|---|---|
| 1 | Joshua Filler | GER | 5 | 370 | 1 | 550 | 17 | 300 | 2 | 480 | 3 | 420 | 5 | 370 | 5 | 370 | 300 | 2560 |
| 2 | Denis Grabe | EST | 5 | 370 | 33 | 275 | 17 | 300 | 17 | 300 | 2 | 480 | 3 | 420 | 1 | 550 | 275 | 2420 |
| 3 | Eklent Kaçi | ALB | 17 | 300 | 49 | 230 | 5 | 370 | 1 | 550 | 17 | 300 | 9 | 330 | 2 | 480 | 230 | 2330 |
| 4 | Fedor Gorst | RUS | 1 | 550 | 9 | 330 | 97 | 180 | 0 | 0 | 5 | 370 | 5 | 370 | 3 | 420 | 0 | 2220 |
| 5 | Ruslan Chinakhov | RUS | 65 | 200 | 2 | 480 | 5 | 370 | 9 | 330 | 9 | 330 | 9 | 330 | 17 | 300 | 200 | 2140 |
| 6 | Alexander Kazakis | GRE | 9 | 330 | 33 | 275 | 9 | 330 | 49 | 230 | 17 | 300 | 1 | 550 | 9 | 330 | 230 | 2115 |
| 7 | Konrad Juszczyszyn | POL | 33 | 275 | 49 | 230 | 1 | 550 | 5 | 370 | 9 | 330 | 65 | 200 | 9 | 330 | 200 | 2085 |
| 8 | Mateusz Śniegocki | POL | 2 | 480 | 33 | 275 | 3 | 420 | 17 | 300 | 9 | 330 | 49 | 230 | 33 | 275 | 230 | 2080 |
| 9 | Ralf Souquet | GER | 9 | 330 | 3 | 420 | 33 | 275 | 3 | 420 | 33 | 275 | 97 | 180 | 9 | 330 | 180 | 2050 |
| 10 | Francisco Sanchez-Ruiz | ESP | 33 | 275 | 5 | 370 | 9 | 330 | 9 | 330 | 9 | 330 | 17 | 300 | 5 | 370 | 275 | 2030 |
| 11 | Maximilian Lechner | AUT | 3 | 420 | 3 | 420 | 97 | 180 | 9 | 330 | 33 | 275 | 17 | 300 | 33 | 275 | 180 | 2020 |
| 12 | Marc Bijsterbosch | NED | 0 | 0 | 17 | 300 | 33 | 275 | 9 | 330 | 3 | 420 | 2 | 480 | 65 | 200 | 0 | 2005 |
| 13 | Damianos Giallourakis | GRE | 33 | 275 | 9 | 330 | 9 | 330 | 3 | 420 | 17 | 300 | 9 | 330 | 33 | 275 | 275 | 1985 |
| 14 | Tomasz Kapłan | POL | 3 | 420 | 17 | 300 | 5 | 370 | 33 | 275 | 65 | 200 | 17 | 300 | 17 | 300 | 200 | 1965 |
| 15 | Mark Gray | GBR | 17 | 300 | 5 | 370 | 9 | 330 | 97 | 180 | 33 | 275 | 9 | 330 | 9 | 330 | 180 | 1935 |
| 16 | Olivér Szolnoki | HUN | 33 | 275 | 49 | 230 | 65 | 200 | 9 | 330 | 5 | 370 | 9 | 330 | 9 | 330 | 200 | 1865 |
| 17 | Ivar Saris | NED | 17 | 300 | 49 | 230 | 2 | 480 | 17 | 300 | 17 | 300 | 49 | 230 | 49 | 230 | 230 | 1840 |
| 18 | Jakub Koniar | SVK | 9 | 330 | 49 | 230 | 17 | 300 | 17 | 300 | 9 | 330 | 17 | 300 | 33 | 275 | 230 | 1835 |
| 19 | Maksim Dudanets | RUS | 9 | 330 | 33 | 275 | 17 | 300 | 65 | 200 | 17 | 300 | 9 | 330 | 17 | 300 | 200 | 1835 |
| 20 | David Alcaide | ESP | 33 | 275 | 65 | 200 | 9 | 330 | 17 | 300 | 65 | 200 | 17 | 300 | 3 | 420 | 200 | 1825 |
| 21 | Albin Ouschan | AUT | 17 | 300 | 5 | 370 | 65 | 200 | 33 | 275 | 33 | 275 | 17 | 300 | 17 | 300 | 200 | 1820 |
| 22 | Wiktor Zielinski | POL | 65 | 200 | 5 | 370 | 49 | 230 | 129 | 160 | 17 | 300 | 5 | 370 | 9 | 330 | 160 | 1800 |
| 23 | Mario He | AUT | 65 | 0 | 0 | 0 | 17 | 300 | 5 | 370 | 1 | 550 | 17 | 300 | 33 | 275 | 0 | 1795 |
| 24 | Roman Hybler | CZE | 9 | 330 | 49 | 230 | 9 | 330 | 17 | 300 | 33 | 275 | 33 | 275 | 33 | 275 | 230 | 1785 |
| 25 | Sanjin Pehlivanovic | BIH | 33 | 275 | 17 | 300 | 49 | 230 | 65 | 200 | 33 | 275 | 9 | 330 | 5 | 370 | 200 | 1780 |
| 26 | Miguel Silva | POR | 5 | 370 | 65 | 200 | 17 | 300 | 17 | 300 | 65 | 200 | 5 | 370 | 49 | 230 | 200 | 1770 |
| 27 | Ivo Aarts | NED | 5 | 370 | 33 | 275 | 33 | 275 | 5 | 370 | 65 | 200 | 33 | 275 | 0 | 0 | 0 | 1765 |
| 28 | Wojciech Szewczyk | POL | 17 | 300 | 9 | 330 | 97 | 180 | 9 | 330 | 49 | 230 | 9 | 330 | 49 | 230 | 180 | 1750 |
| 29 | Dimitris Loukatos | GRE | 17 | 300 | 9 | 330 | 49 | 230 | 129 | 160 | 33 | 275 | 17 | 300 | 17 | 300 | 160 | 1735 |
| 30 | Radosław Babica | POL | 33 | 275 | 33 | 275 | 33 | 275 | 9 | 330 | 17 | 300 | 33 | 275 | 65 | 200 | 200 | 1730 |
| 31 | Mats Schjetne | NOR | 0 | 0 | 17 | 300 | 17 | 300 | 33 | 275 | 129 | 160 | 3 | 420 | 33 | 275 | 0 | 1730 |
| 32 | Mieszko Fortunski | POL | 9 | 330 | 49 | 230 | 65 | 200 | 17 | 300 | 129 | 160 | 33 | 275 | 5 | 370 | 160 | 1705 |
| 33 | Niels Feijen | NED | 17 | 300 | 9 | 330 | 65 | 200 | 17 | 300 | 65 | 200 | 49 | 230 | 9 | 330 | 200 | 1690 |
| 34 | Daniel Macioł | POL | 97 | 180 | 9 | 330 | 33 | 275 | 33 | 275 | 65 | 200 | 17 | 300 | 17 | 300 | 180 | 1680 |
| 35 | Petri Makkonen | FIN | 17 | 300 | 129 | 160 | 9 | 330 | 17 | 300 | 129 | 160 | 17 | 300 | 33 | 275 | 160 | 1665 |
| 36 | Imran Majid | GBR | 65 | 200 | 9 | 330 | 17 | 300 | 17 | 300 | 49 | 230 | 97 | 180 | 17 | 300 | 180 | 1660 |
| 37 | Sergey Lutsker | RUS | 49 | 230 | 33 | 275 | 33 | 275 | 33 | 275 | 17 | 300 | 97 | 180 | 17 | 300 | 180 | 1655 |
| 38 | Tim De Ruyter | NED | 17 | 300 | 65 | 200 | 65 | 200 | 9 | 330 | 17 | 300 | 65 | 200 | 17 | 300 | 200 | 1630 |
| 39 | Wojciech Sroczynski | POL | 49 | 230 | 33 | 275 | 49 | 230 | 33 | 275 | 97 | 180 | 17 | 300 | 17 | 300 | 180 | 1610 |
| 40 | Nick Malai | GRE | 65 | 200 | 33 | 275 | 17 | 300 | 65 | 200 | 17 | 300 | 49 | 230 | 17 | 300 | 200 | 1605 |
| 41 | Alex Montpellier | FRA | 97 | 180 | 17 | 300 | 33 | 275 | 65 | 200 | 5 | 370 | 33 | 275 | 97 | 180 | 180 | 1600 |
| 42 | Karol Skowerski | POL | 17 | 300 | 97 | 180 | 33 | 275 | 49 | 230 | 17 | 300 | 33 | 275 | 65 | 200 | 180 | 1580 |
| 43 | Vitaliy Patsura | UKR | 49 | 230 | 33 | 275 | 49 | 230 | 33 | 275 | 33 | 275 | 33 | 275 | 65 | 200 | 200 | 1560 |
| 44 | Marco Dorenburg | GER | 0 | 0 | 33 | 275 | 65 | 200 | 17 | 300 | 33 | 275 | 33 | 275 | 49 | 230 | 0 | 1555 |
| 45 | Konstantinos Koukiadakis | GRE | 65 | 200 | 17 | 300 | 65 | 200 | 17 | 300 | 97 | 180 | 33 | 275 | 33 | 275 | 180 | 1550 |
| 46 | Marek Kudlik | POL | 49 | 230 | 9 | 330 | 33 | 275 | 33 | 275 | 97 | 180 | 65 | 200 | 49 | 230 | 180 | 1540 |
| 47 | Jani Siekkinen | FIN | 65 | 200 | 33 | 275 | 49 | 230 | 49 | 230 | 129 | 160 | 17 | 300 | 17 | 300 | 160 | 1535 |
| 48 | Pijus Labutis | LIT | 129 | 160 | 129 | 160 | 3 | 420 | 97 | 180 | 17 | 300 | 65 | 200 | 33 | 275 | 160 | 1535 |
| 49 | Nikos Ekonomopoulos | GRE | 0 | 0 | 0 | 0 | 17 | 300 | 33 | 275 | 9 | 330 | 17 | 300 | 17 | 300 | 0 | 1505 |
| 50 | Tobias Bongers | GER | 65 | 200 | 17 | 300 | 33 | 275 | 17 | 300 | 65 | 200 | 65 | 200 | 0 | 0 | 0 | 1475 |

=== Women's ===
| Rank | Name | Nation | Treviso (2018) | | Treviso | | Austria | | Veldhoven | | Klagenfurt | | Antalya | | Min | Total |
| Rank | Name | Nation | Pos | Points | Pos | Pts | Pos | Pts | Pos | Pts | Pos | Pts | Pos | Pts | Min | Total |
|---|---|---|---|---|---|---|---|---|---|---|---|---|---|---|---|---|
| 1 | Kristina Tkach | RUS | 1 | 550 | 1 | 550 | 0 | 0 | 5 | 370 | 3 | 420 | 3 | 420 | 0 | 2310 |
| 2 | Jasmin Ouschan | AUT | 3 | 420 | 9 | 330 | 1 | 550 | 1 | 550 | 3 | 420 | 0 | 0 | 0 | 2270 |
| 3 | Oliwia Zalewska | POL | 2 | 480 | 9 | 330 | 25 | 275 | 17 | 300 | 1 | 550 | 1 | 550 | 275 | 2210 |
| 4 | Marharyta Fefilava | BLR | 5 | 370 | 2 | 480 | 2 | 480 | 9 | 330 | 2 | 480 | 5 | 370 | 330 | 2180 |
| 5 | Melanie Suessenguth | GER | 0 | 0 | 9 | 330 | 9 | 330 | 2 | 480 | 5 | 370 | 5 | 370 | 0 | 1880 |
| 6 | Tina Vogelmann | GER | 9 | 330 | 25 | 275 | 17 | 300 | 3 | 420 | 17 | 300 | 2 | 480 | 275 | 1830 |
| 7 | Ana Gradišnik | SLO | 5 | 370 | 3 | 420 | 9 | 330 | 25 | 275 | 5 | 370 | 9 | 330 | 275 | 1820 |
| 8 | Veronika Hubrtová | CZE | 17 | 300 | 17 | 300 | 3 | 420 | 3 | 420 | 17 | 300 | 9 | 330 | 300 | 1770 |
| 9 | Ina Kaplan | GER | 17 | 300 | 0 | 0 | 5 | 370 | 5 | 370 | 9 | 330 | 9 | 330 | 0 | 1700 |
| 10 | Pia Filler | GER | 17 | 300 | 5 | 370 | 9 | 330 | 17 | 300 | 9 | 330 | 5 | 370 | 300 | 1700 |
| 11 | Veronika Ivanovskaia | GER | 9 | 330 | 5 | 370 | 9 | 330 | 49 | 0 | 9 | 330 | 9 | 330 | 0 | 1690 |
| 12 | Kristina Zlateva | BUL | 5 | 370 | 9 | 330 | 17 | 300 | 49 | 230 | 5 | 370 | 17 | 300 | 230 | 1670 |
| 13 | Christine Steinlage | GER | 9 | 330 | 17 | 300 | 25 | 275 | 9 | 330 | 25 | 275 | 3 | 420 | 275 | 1655 |
| 14 | Tamara Peeters | NED | 17 | 300 | 17 | 300 | 5 | 370 | 17 | 300 | 9 | 330 | 9 | 330 | 300 | 1630 |
| 15 | Monika Margeta | SWE | 25 | 275 | 9 | 330 | 5 | 370 | 17 | 300 | 9 | 330 | 25 | 275 | 275 | 1605 |
| 16 | Louise Furberg | SWE | 9 | 330 | 33 | 235 | 9 | 330 | 9 | 330 | 5 | 370 | 0 | 0 | 0 | 1595 |
| 17 | Vania Franco | POR | 17 | 300 | 9 | 330 | 9 | 330 | 9 | 330 | 17 | 300 | 17 | 300 | 300 | 1590 |
| 18 | Ine Helvik | NOR | 9 | 330 | 25 | 275 | 33 | 235 | 9 | 330 | 17 | 300 | 9 | 330 | 235 | 1565 |
| 19 | Ewa Bak | POL | 17 | 300 | 9 | 330 | 17 | 300 | 17 | 300 | 17 | 300 | 0 | 0 | 0 | 1530 |
| 20 | Monika Zabek | POL | 9 | 330 | 33 | 235 | 9 | 330 | 25 | 275 | 9 | 330 | 0 | 0 | 0 | 1500 |
| 21 | Yvonne Ullmann-Hybler | GER | 33 | 235 | 33 | 235 | 33 | 235 | 9 | 330 | 17 | 300 | 17 | 300 | 235 | 1400 |
| 22 | Kateryna Polovinchuk | UKR | 0 | 0 | 3 | 420 | 17 | 300 | 9 | 330 | 0 | 0 | 9 | 330 | 0 | 1380 |
| 23 | Aleksandra Guleikova | RUS | 25 | 275 | 33 | 235 | 9 | 330 | 33 | 235 | 0 | 0 | 17 | 300 | 0 | 1375 |
| 24 | Lynn Pijpers | NED | 33 | 235 | 25 | 275 | 25 | 275 | 33 | 235 | 33 | 235 | 17 | 300 | 235 | 1320 |
| 25 | Sara Rocha | POR | 25 | 275 | 5 | 370 | 3 | 420 | 33 | 235 | 0 | 0 | 0 | 0 | 0 | 1300 |
| 26 | Nathalie Rohmer | FRA | 33 | 235 | 25 | 275 | 33 | 235 | 49 | 230 | 33 | 235 | 0 | 0 | 0 | 1210 |
| 27 | Natalia Seroshtan | RUS | 3 | 420 | 5 | 370 | 0 | 0 | 5 | 370 | 0 | 0 | 0 | 0 | 0 | 1160 |
| 28 | Iza Lacka | POL | 0 | 0 | 17 | 300 | 33 | 235 | 25 | 275 | 25 | 275 | 0 | 0 | 0 | 1085 |
| 29 | Yana Shut | BLR | 0 | 0 | 25 | 275 | 17 | 300 | 33 | 235 | 25 | 275 | 0 | 0 | 0 | 1085 |
| 30 | Elise Qiu | NED | 17 | 300 | 33 | 235 | 0 | 0 | 49 | 230 | 0 | 0 | 25 | 275 | 0 | 1040 |
| 31 | Kamila Khodjaeva | BEL | 0 | 0 | 0 | 0 | 0 | 0 | 5 | 370 | 9 | 330 | 9 | 330 | 0 | 1030 |
| 32 | Diana Stateczny | GER | 0 | 0 | 0 | 0 | 0 | 0 | 9 | 330 | 9 | 330 | 5 | 370 | 0 | 1030 |
| 33 | Sabrina Cisternino | SUI | 25 | 275 | 33 | 235 | 25 | 275 | 33 | 235 | 0 | 0 | 0 | 0 | 0 | 1020 |
| 34 | Daria Holieva | UKR | 25 | 275 | 25 | 275 | 33 | 235 | 0 | 0 | 33 | 235 | 0 | 0 | 0 | 1020 |
| 35 | Diana Khodjaeva | BEL | 0 | 0 | 0 | 0 | 5 | 370 | 17 | 300 | 17 | 300 | 0 | 0 | 0 | 970 |
| 36 | Eylül Kibaroğlu | TUR | 0 | 0 | 17 | 300 | 0 | 0 | 25 | 275 | 0 | 0 | 25 | 275 | 0 | 850 |
| 37 | Denise Steinmetz | GER | 0 | 0 | 25 | 275 | 17 | 300 | 25 | 275 | 0 | 0 | 0 | 0 | 0 | 850 |
| 38 | Karin Michl | GER | 0 | 0 | 0 | 0 | 25 | 275 | 33 | 235 | 25 | 275 | 0 | 0 | 0 | 785 |
| 39 | Kristina Jaeger | GER | 0 | 0 | 17 | 300 | 33 | 235 | 33 | 235 | 0 | 0 | 0 | 0 | 0 | 770 |
| 40 | Kinga Rauk | POL | 0 | 0 | 17 | 300 | 33 | 235 | 49 | 230 | 0 | 0 | 0 | 0 | 0 | 765 |
| 41 | Francesca Garlatti | ITA | 0 | 0 | 25 | 275 | 33 | 235 | 0 | 0 | 33 | 235 | 0 | 0 | 0 | 745 |
| 42 | Ann-Sofie Lofgren | SWE | 0 | 0 | 0 | 0 | 33 | 235 | 33 | 235 | 0 | 0 | 25 | 275 | 0 | 745 |
| 43 | Anna Riegler | AUT | 0 | 0 | 33 | 235 | 33 | 235 | 0 | 0 | 33 | 235 | 0 | 0 | 0 | 705 |
| 44 | Miriam Spycher | SUI | 33 | 235 | 0 | 0 | 33 | 235 | 33 | 235 | 0 | 0 | 0 | 0 | 0 | 705 |
| 45 | Julienne Wolf | GER | 0 | 0 | 33 | 235 | 49 | 230 | 49 | 230 | 0 | 0 | 0 | 0 | 0 | 695 |
| 46 | Christine Feldmann | SUI | 5 | 370 | 0 | 0 | 17 | 300 | 0 | 0 | 0 | 0 | 0 | 0 | 0 | 670 |
| 47 | Jessika Nilsson | SWE | 25 | 275 | 0 | 0 | 17 | 300 | 0 | 0 | 0 | 0 | 0 | 0 | 0 | 575 |
| 48 | Melissa Kuys-Rademakers | NED | 0 | 0 | 9 | 330 | 0 | 0 | 33 | 235 | 0 | 0 | 0 | 0 | 0 | 565 |
| 49 | Lena Primus | AUT | 0 | 0 | 0 | 0 | 25 | 275 | 0 | 0 | 25 | 275 | 0 | 0 | 0 | 550 |
| 50 | Seychelyne Knapp | AUT | 0 | 0 | 0 | 0 | 33 | 235 | 0 | 0 | 25 | 275 | 0 | 0 | 0 | 510 |
