= 2019 Treviso Open =

International pool tournament, held May 2019

Tournament information
- Dates: 8–11 May 2019
- Venue: Best Western Premier BHR Treviso Hotel
- City: Treviso
- Country: Italy
- Organisation: Euro Tour
- Format: Single-elimination, double-elimination
- Total prize fund: €38,000
- Winner's share: €4,500

Final
- Champion: Konrad Juszczyszyn (POL) (m); Kristina Tkach (RUS) (f)
- Runner-up: Ivar Saris (NED); Marharyta Fefilava (BLR) (f)
- Score: 9–6 (m) / 7–5 (f)

The 2019 Treviso Open (sometimes known as the 2019 Dynamic Billard Italian Open) was a nine-ball pool tournament, and the second Euro Tour event of the 2019 season. The event was held from 8 to 11 May 2019, at the Best Western Premier BHR Treviso Hotel in Treviso, Italy. The event had a total prize pool of €38,000 with the winner of each event receiving €4,500. The event followed the Leende Open, and preceded the Austria Open.

The event was won by Polish player Konrad Juszczyszyn who defeated the Netherlands' Ivar Saris in the final 9–6. The defending champion was Fedor Gorst from the Netherlands, who defeated Mateusz Śniegocki 9–7 in the 2018 Treviso Open final. However, Gorst failed to progress to the knockout round. Russia's Kristina Tkach was the defending champion of the women's event, having defeated Oliwia Zalewska in the 2018 final 7–0. Tkach successfully defended the championship, defeating Marharyta Fefilava in the final 7–5.

== Tournament format ==
The men's event was held from 8 to 11 May, and the Women's took place between 9 and 11 May. Both events were first played as a double-elimination tournament. It was held at the Best Western Premier BHR Treviso Hotel in Treviso, Italy. The men's event became a single-elimination bracket at the round-of-32, while the women's event remained a double-elimination tournament until the round-of-16. All men's matches were played as race-to-nine racks, whilst the women's matches were race-to-seven racks. The men's defending champion was Netherlands' Fedor Gorst, who defeated Mateusz Śniegocki 9–7 in the 2018 Treviso Open final. Russia's Kristina Tkach was the defending champion of the women's event, having defeated Oliwia Zalewska in the previous year's final 7–0.

=== Prize fund ===
Both the men's and women's event's prize fund was similar to those of other Euro Tour events, totalling €38,000, with €4,500 being awarded to the winners of the event.

Place	Prize money
Winner	€4,500
Finalist	€3,000
Semi finalist	€1,750
Quarter finalist	€1,250
Last-16	€1,000
Last-32	€600
33–48	€275
Total	€38,000

== Tournament Summary ==
=== Men's event ===
208 participants entered the men's event held from 8 to 11 May. Mike Massey, the 72-year-old World Trickshot Champion competed at his first Euro Tour event. Massey lost both of his games to Bruno Ernst and Juan Antonio Pina-Hidalgo. Albin Ouschan lost his initial match 9–4 against Casper Matikainen. Ouschan won the next two matches, before he lost to Vitaliy Patsura 9–6, and failed to progress. Defending champion Fedor Gorst also failed to progress, he lost two of his three matches, to Konstantinos Koukiadakis and Ruslan Chinakhov.

In the single-elimination round, six-time winner Mark Gray defeated Sebastian Staab 9–8 in the last-32 stage. Gray led 4–2, but Staab won four consecutive racks to lead 6–4. The pair shared the next four racks with Staab leading 8–6. Gray won the next three racks to win the match. Post-match, Gray commented he was mystified as to how he won the game. Francisco Sánchez Ruiz and Mario He also finished on a deciding rack. Sánchez Ruíz won the match, despite not leading before that point.

Polish player Konrad Juszczyszyn reached his second Tour final, defeating Alexander Kazakis, Casper Matikainen, and Pijus Labutis. His opponent was Ivar Saris, who was playing in his first Euro Tour final, after defeating David Alcaide, Ruslan Chinakhov, and Mateusz Śniegocki. Neither player had won a Tour event prior. The final was played, and had an increased number of jump shots, with Juszczyszyn leading throughout. He led at 4–3 and 6–4 before Saris won the next two to tie the match at 6–6. Juszczyszyn won the next three racks to win his first Euro Tour event 9–6.

=== Women's event ===
A total of 44 participants played in the women's event between 9 and 11 May. This was the first event of the 2019 season for the women, as the Leende Open had no women's division. Number one ranked Kristina Tkach defeated Sara Rocha 7–2 and Veronika Ivanovskaia to progress to the single-elimination round. Second ranked Jasmin Ouschan had to win two deciding racks to progress, after defeating both Kristina Jaeger and Veronika Hubrtová 7–6. Euro Tour third ranked player Marharyta Fefilava completed a whitewash of Nathalie Seichter, before a 7–4 win over Poland's Iza Lacka. Ana Gradišnik played Turkey's Eylül Kibaroğlu in the qualification round. Kibaroglu led 6–3, and had two balls to pot to win the match. She accidentally snookered herself behind the 9-ball. Gradišnik took advantage and won the following four racks to claim a victory and progress to the single-elimination rounds.

In the last-16 stage, Ouschan lost to Ivanovskaia 7–4, resulting in Tkach being guaranteed to remain as the highest ranked player after the event. The 2018 runner-up Oliwia Czuprynska also lost at this stage, being defeated by Natalia Seroshtan 7–4. The semi-final lineup was made up of Tkach, Gradišnik, Fefilava and Kateryna Polovinchuk. The first semi-final had Gradišnik leading 6–5 over Tkach; she made errors in both the 12th and 13th racks to allow Tkach to win 6–7. Fefilava defeated Polovinchuk 7–1. The final was contested between the first and third ranked players on the Tour, with Tkach taking an early 5–1 lead. Fefilava took four of the next five racks to trail at 6–5, before Tkach won the next rack to retain the championship.

== Results ==
=== Men's competition ===
The results for the men's knockout round is shown below. Players in bold denote match winners.

1st Round
**Eklent Kaçi (ALB)**	**9**
Jakub Koniar (SVK)	2
**Roman Hybler (CZE)**	**9**
Maksim Dudanets (RUS)	1
**Mark Gray (GBR)**	**9**
Sebastian Staab (GER)	8
Nikos Ekonomopoulos (GRE)	3
**Mateusz Śniegocki (POL)**	**9**
**Ruslan Chinakhov (RUS)**	**9**
Denis Grabe (EST)	5
**Petri Makkonen (FIN)**	**9**
Miguel Silva (POR)	6
Mauro Catriota (ITA)	6
**Ivar Saris (NED)**	**9**
Imran Majid (GBR)	7
**David Alcaide (ESP)**	**9**
**Casper Maitkainen (FIN)**	**9**
Fabio Rizzi (FRA)	5
**Damianos Giallourakis (GRE)**	**9**
Edmond Zaja (ALB)	8
Christian Fröhlich (GER)	5
**Konrad Juszczyszyn (POL)**	**9**
Mats Schjetne (NOR)	6
**Alexander Kazakis (GRE)**	**9**
**Francisco Díaz-Pizarro (ESP)**	**9**
Nick Malai (GRE)	4
**Pijus Labutis (LIT)**	**9**
Konstantin Stepanov (RUS)	7
Mario He (AUT)	8
**Francisco Sánchez Ruiz (ESP)**	**9**
**Thomas Kaplan (POL)**	**9**
Joshua Filler (GER)	5

2nd Round
(Albania) **Eklent Kaçi**	**9**
(Czech Republic) Roman Hybler	6
(United Kingdom) Mark Gray	8
(Poland) **Mateusz Śniegocki**	**9**
(Russia) **Ruslan Chinakhov**	**9**
(Finland) Petri Makkonen	4
(Netherlands) **Ivar Saris**	**9**
(Spain) David Alcaide	7
(Finland) **Casper Maitkainen**	**9**
(Greece) Damianos Giallourakis	5
(Poland) **Konrad Juszczyszyn**	**9**
(Greece) Alexander Kazakis	7
(Spain) Francisco Díaz-Pizarro	8
(Lithuania) **Pijus Labutis**	**9**
(Spain) Francisco Sánchez Ruiz	8
(Poland) **Thomas Kaplan**	**9**

Quarterfinals
(Albania) Eklent Kaçi	7
(Poland) **Mateusz Śniegocki**	**9**
(Russia) Ruslan Chinakhov	7
(Netherlands) **Ivar Saris**	**9**
(Finland) Casper Maitkainen	5
(Poland) **Konrad Juszczyszyn**	**9**
(Lithuania) **Pijus Labutis**	**9**
(Poland) Thomas Kaplan	2

Semifinals
(Poland) Mateusz Śniegocki	4
(Netherlands) **Ivar Saris**	**9**
Finals
(Netherlands) Ivar Saris	6
(Poland) **Konrad Juszczyszyn**	**9**
(Poland) **Konrad Juszczyszyn**	**9**
(Lithuania) Pijus Labutis	4

=== Women's event ===
The following results are from the knockout stages following the round of 16. Players in bold denote match winners:

First round
**Kristina Tkach (RUS)**	**7**
Kristina Zlateva (HUN)	3
Vania Franco (POR)	3
**Sara Rocha (POR)**	**7**
**Ana Gradišnik (SLO)**	**7**
Monika Margeta (SWE)	2
Melissa Rademakers (HUN)	3
**Pia Filler (GER)**	**7**
**Marharyta Fefilava (BLR)**	**7**
Melanie Suessenguth (GER)	2
**Natalia Seroshtan (RUS)**	**7**
Oliwia Zalewska (POL)	4
**Kateryna Polovnchuk (UKR)**	**7**
Ewa Bak (POL)	5
Jasmin Ouschan (AUT)	4
**Veronika Ivanovskaia (GER)**	**7**

Quarter-finals
(Russia) **Kristina Tkach**	**7**
(Portugal) Sara Rocha	2
**(Slovenia) Ana Gradišnik**	**7**
(Germany) Pia Filler	2
**(Belarus) Marharyta Fefilava**	**7**
(Russia) Natalia Seroshtan	4
**(Ukraine) Kateryna Polovnchuk**	**7**
(Germany) Veronika Ivanovskaia

Semi-finals
(Russia) **Kristina Tkach**	**7**
(Slovenia) Ana Gradišnik	6
**(Belarus) Marharyta Fefilava**	7
(Ukraine) Kateryna Polovnchuk	1

Final
(Russia) **Kristina Tkach**	**7**
(Belarus) Marharyta Fefilava	5
