= 2019 Austria Open =

9-Ball pool tournament, June 2019

2019 Dynamic Billard St. Johann im Pongau Open

Tournament information
- Dates: 13–16 June
- Venue: Alpina, Wellness & Sporthotel
- City: Sankt Johann im Pongau
- Country: Austria
- Organisation: Euro Tour
- Format: Single elimination, double-elimination
- Total prize fund: €38,000
- Winner's share: €4,500
- Defending champion: Alexander Kazakis (GRE)

Final
- Champion: Eklent Kaçi (ALB) (m); Jasmin Ouschan (AUT) (f)
- Runner-up: Joshua Filler (GER) (m); Marharyta Fefilava (BLR) (f)
- Score: 9–6

The 2019 Dynamic Billard St. Johann im Pongau Open (Note: also known as the 2019 Austria Open) was a professional nine-ball pool tournament and the third Euro Tour event of 2019. The event was held from 13 to 16 June 2019, at the Alpina, Wellness & Sporthotel in Sankt Johann im Pongau, Austria. The event followed the Treviso Open, won by Poland's Konrad Juszczyszyn, and preceded the Veldhoven Open.

The St. Johann im Pongau Open final was contested between the top two ranked players, Eklent Kaçi and Joshua Filler. Kaçi won the event, defeating Filler 9–6. Alexander Kazakis was the defending champion, having defeated Denis Grabe in the 2018 Austria Open final (9–5). However, Kazakis lost twice in the double-elimination round and did not reach the knockout round. Jasmin Ouschan was the defending champion of the women's event, after defeating Marharyta Fefilava in the 2018 final (7–2). In a rematch of the previous year's event, Ouschan defended her championship by defeating Fefilava 7–1 in this year's final.

== Format ==
The St. Johann im Pongau Open was played as a double-elimination knockout tournament, until the round of 32. From that point on, the event continued as a single elimination bracket. All matches were played as a race-to-nine-racks under the alternative break format. The event had a total of 196 players competing in the double elimination round. The women's event had 49 participants in a different double-elimination bracket until the round of 16, also continuing as a single elimination tournament form.

The previous years' women's champion Jasmin Ouschan competed in both the men's and women's event.

=== Prize fund ===
The tournament prize fund was similar to that of other Euro Tour events; €4,500 was awarded to the winner of the event.

Place	Prize money
Winner	€4,500
Finalist	€3,000
Semi finalist	€1,750
Quarter finalist	€1,250
last 16	€1,000
Last 32	€600
33–48	€275
Total	€38,000

== Summary ==
The event began on 13 June 2019. Matches were played on 24 tables, across the Alpina Alpendorf & Sporthotel Pre-event, International Billiard Promotion Foundation (IPBF) president David Morris signed a contract with venue owner Theo Riedlecke for the event to be held in the resort for the following three years. Matches were broadcast live via the Euro Tour website, with some matches streamed via Facebook and pool website Kozoom. The event also had guest commentary for matches by players such as Joshua Filler. The defending champion was Alexander Kazakis, after defeating Denis Grabe 9–5 in the previous year's final.

=== Double-elimination ===
The double-elimination round began with 196 participants; players were eliminated after losing two matches. On the first day, multiple time champion, Thorsten Hohmann was defeated by Niels Feijen. Feijen took an early 3–1 lead, despite both players making errors. Feijen then extended his advantage to lead 7–2. Both players made a golden break before Feijen won rack 12 to defeat Hohmann 9–3. Hohmann failed to progress to the knockout round, being eliminated in the third losers' round to Sanjin Pehlivanovic 9–2. Fifth-ranked Mark Gray also lost on the first day to Fabio Petroni. Petroni and Gray remained level at 3–3 before Petroni won six of the next seven racks to progress 9–4. Gray would be defeated again in the third losers' round, 9–4 to Alex Montpellier to be eliminated. Three-time world champion Oliver Ortmann was also defeated by Imran Majid 2–9, before being eliminated in the second losers' round to Mariusz Skoneczny.

Defending champion Kazakis also failed to qualify for the round of 32. He lost his second match to Damianos Giallourakis 9–7. He then defeated Nick Malai on a deciding rack 9–8 in the losers' fourth round. In his decisive play-off match, Kazakis lost to Daniel Macioł 9–6, and he was thus eliminated.

=== Knockout ===
The last 32 players competed on a single elimination bracket, with the round-of-32 played on 14 June. The top two ranked players Eklent Kaçi and Joshua Filler both qualified for the round-of-16, with wins over David Alcaide and Christian Froehlich respectively. Third-ranked Mateusz Śniegocki was defeated by 55th ranked Tim De Ruyter 6–9. Wojciech Szewczyk qualified for the round-of-16 after completing a whitewash of Stefan Huber.

The round-of-16 to the final was played on 15 June. Two round-of-16 matches were decided on a final rack: Ralf Souquet defeated Radosław Babica and Kaçi defeated Wojciech Szewczyk, both 9–8. Mario He, who missed the 2019 Leende Open due to a drugs offence, was ranked seventh for the tournament because he had two tournament wins in 2018. He defeated Marc Bijsterbosch in the round-of-16, 9–1. In the quarter-finals, He lost to Giallourakis, who reached his first Euro Tour semi-final. (Note: Giallourakis' previous best finish was in the 2017 Treviso Open, where he lost in the quarter-finals.) Elsewhere, the two Treviso Open finalists Ivo Aarts and Konrad Juszczyszyn lost to Filler and Kaçi respectively. In the semi-finals, Kaçi defeated Souquet 9–5 and Filler defeated Giallourakis 9–6; both reaching the final.

In the final, the two highest ranked players for the tournament faced each other. Kaçi had finished as the runner up in both the 2018 Veldhoven Open and the 2018 Leende Open, ending up as the highest in the rankings. Filler having won the 2019 Leende Open and was ranked second. The winner of the final would take the first place in the Euro Tour rankings. The final started with racks being won in line with the break, until Kaçi took a 3–2 lead. However, Filler brought the match to 5–5, before Kaçi went ahead again at 7–5. Filler won the next rack, but Kaçi won the next to take him to the hill at 8–6. Breaking to remain in the match, Filler's attempt was illegal, handing the table to Kaçi, who ran the rack to win the match 9–6. As a result, Kaçi remained the number one Euro Tour player, and Filler retained his second place.

== Women's event ==
The women's event took place on 15 and 16 June 2019, with matches being held as a race-to-seven racks; 49 players participated. The defending champion was Jasmin Ouschan, who won the previous year's event, defeating Marharyta Fefilava in the final 7–2. Kristina Tkach, ranked first in the Euro Tour women's ranking, did not appear at the event. The double-elimination round started on 15 June, with 16 players qualifying for the knockout round. Despite not competing since 2016, Kamila Khodjaeva (Note: also known as Diana Khodjaeva) won all three of her opening matches, including wins over Kinga Rauk, Ewa Bak and Fefilava to reach the knockout round.

After reaching the round of 16, the event continued as a single elimination tournament. Ouschan defeated Ana Gradišnik 7–1, Ina Kaplan 7–1, and Sara Rocha 7–5 to reach the final. Fefilawa also reached the final, defeating Pia Filler 7–3, Monika Margeta 7–5, and Veronika Hubrtová 7–4. The same players faced each other as the 2018 final; Ouschan defeated Fafilawa to win her 14th Euro Tour title. Fefilawa won the opening rack despite missing the 9-ball, but lost the remaining racks and ultimately finished at 1–7. After the victory, Ouschan said: "I feel really comfortable here, although playing in Austria always means a bit more pressure for me ... My success story here in St. Johann is something very special."

== Results ==
=== Men's event ===
Below is the results from the round of 32 (Last 32) onward with positions were determined by performance in the double elimination round. Players in bold denote match winners:

1st Round
**Eklent Kaçi (ALB)**	9
David Alcaide (SPA)	7
Stefan Huber (AUT)	0
**Wojciech Szewczyk (POL)**	9
**Konrad Juszczyszyn (POL)**	9
Imran Majid (GBR)	4
**Maximilian Lechner (AUT)**	9
Petri Makkonen (FIN)	7
**Radosław Babica (POL)**	9
Konstantinos Koukiadakis (GRE)	5
**Ralf Souquet (GER)**	9
Miguel Silva (POR)	7
**Francisco Sánchez Ruiz (ESP)**	9
Tobias Bongers (GER)	4
Denis Grabe (EST)	6
**Konstantin Stepanov (RUS)**	9
Mateusz Śniegocki (POL)	6
**Tim De Ruyter (NED)**	9
**Damianos Giallourakis (GRE)**	9
Mieszko Fortuński (POL)	6
**Marc Bijsterbosch (NED)**	9
Jakub Koniar (SVK)	7
**Mario He (AUT)**	9
Niels Feijen (NED)	6
**Ruslan Chinakhov (RUS)**	9
Ivar Saris (NED)	4
Marco Dorenburg (GER)	6
**Ivo Aarts (NED)**	9
**Olivér Szolnoki (HUN)**	9
Roman Hybler (CZE)	7
Christian Froehlich (GER)	3
**Joshua Filler (GER)**	9

2nd Round
**(Albania) Eklent Kaçi**	9
(Poland) Wojciech Szewczyk	8
**(Poland) Konrad Juszczyszyn**	9
(Austria) Maximilian Lechner	6
(Poland) Radosław Babica	8
**(Germany) Ralf Souquet**	9
(Spain) Francisco Sánchez Ruiz	3
**(Russia) Konstantin Stepanov**	9
(Netherlands) Tim De Ruyter	7
**(Greece) Damianos Giallourakis**	9
(Netherlands) Marc Bijsterbosch	1
**(Austria) Mario He**	9
(Russia) Ruslan Chinakhov	6
**(Netherlands) Ivo Aarts**	9
(Hungary) Olivér Szolnoki	3
**(Germany) Joshua Filler**	9

Quarterfinals
**(Albania) Eklent Kaçi**	9
(Poland) Konrad Juszczyszyn	5
**(Germany) Ralf Souquet**	9
(Russia) Konstantin Stepanov	7
**(Greece) Damianos Giallourakis**	9
(Austria) Mario He	4
(Netherlands) Ivo Aarts	7
**(Germany) Joshua Filler**	9

Semifinals
**(Albania) Eklent Kaçi**	9
(Germany) Ralf Souquet	5
Finals
**(Albania) Eklent Kaçi**	9
(Germany) Joshua Filler	6
(Greece) Damianos Giallourakis	6
**(Germany) Joshua Filler**	9

=== Women's event ===
The following results are from the knockout stages following the round of 16 (Last 16). Players in bold denote match winners:

First round
**Jasmin Ouschan (AUT)**	7
Ana Gradišnik (SLO)	1
**Ina Kaplan (GER)**	7
Vania Franco (POR)	3
Louise Furberg (SWE)	5
**Sara Rocha (POR)**	7
**Tamara Peeters (NED)**	7
Melanie Suessenguth (GER)	5
Aleksandra Guleikova (RUS)	4
**Monika Margeta (SWE)**	7
Pia Filler (GER)	3
**Marharyta Fefilava (BLR)**	7
Monika Zabek (POL)	5
**Veronika Hubrtová (CZE)**	7
**Diana Khodjaeva (BEL)**	7
Veronika Ivanovskaia (GER)	5

Quarter-finals
**(Austria) Jasmin Ouschan**	7
(Germany) Ina Kaplan	1
**(Portugal) Sara Rocha**	7
(Netherlands) Tamara Peeters	3
(Sweden) Monika Margeta	5
**(Belarus) Marharyta Fefilava**	7
**(Czech Republic) Veronika Hubrtová**	7
(Belgium) Diana Khodjaeva	3

Semi-finals
**(Austria) Jasmin Ouschan**	7
(Portugal) Sara Rocha	5
**(Belarus) Marharyta Fefilava**	7
(Czech Republic) Veronika Hubrtová	4

Final
**(Austria) Jasmin Ouschan**	7
(Belarus) Marharyta Fefilava	1
