= 2021 WPA World Nine-ball Championship =

WPA World 9-Ball Championship 2021
Tournament information
- Sport: 9-ball
- Location: Marshall Arena, Milton Keynes, England
- Dates: June 6, 2021–June 10, 2021
- Tournament format: Double elimination / Single elimination
- Host(s): WPA World Nine-ball Championship, Matchroom Pool
- Participants: 128

Final positions
- Champion: Albin Ouschan (AUT)
- Runner-up: Omar Al-Shaheen (KUW)

The 2021 World Pool Championship was a pool tournament that took place between June 6 to 10, 2021 in the Marshall Arena in Milton Keynes, England. Following the 2021 Championship League Pool and the 2021 World Cup of Pool it was the third event of the season to be held in Milton Keynes.

The reigning champion was Russian player Fedor Gorst, who defeated Chang Jung-lin 13–11 in the 2019 final. This year, he lost in the round of 64 to Skyler Woodward 8–11.

== Format ==
The event was entered by 128 participants who were initially divided into 16 groups of 8 players, in which they competed against each other from June 6 to 7 in a double elimination tournament. Four players in each group qualified for the final round, which was played from June 8 to 10. The event was played under "winners break" format.

The early rounds were held behind closed doors, but fans were allowed for the final day.

=== Prize money ===
The event saw a total prize pool of $250,000, an increase of $100,000 from the previous edition. The winner's share was increased from $30,000 to $50,000.

	Prize money
Winner	50.000 US$
Final	25.000 US$
Semi-final	12.500 US$
Quarter-final	7.500 US$
Last 16	4.000 US$
Last 32	2.500 US$
Last 64	1.000 US$
Last 96 (1 group win)	500 US$
Total	250.000 US$

== Results ==
The draw was made during the 2021 World Pool Masters. The results are shown below, with bold denoting match winners.

=== Group A ===
**Main Round**
Fedor Gorst (RUS)	4
Mark Mägi (EST)	9
Mark Gray (GBR)	9
Julio Burgos (PUR)	0
Jeffrey de Luna (PHI)	4
Dimitri Jungo (SUI)	5
Konrad Juszczyszyn (POL)	0
Jasmin Ouschan (AUT)	0
1st playoff round
Fedor Gorst (RUS)	0
Julio Burgos (PUR)	0
(25x17px)	0
(25x17px)	0

**Winner’s Round**
Mark Mägi (EST)	0
Mark Gray (GBR)	0
(25x17px)	0
(25x17px)	0
2nd playoff round
(25x17px)	0
(25x17px)	0
(25x17px)	0
(25x17px)	0

=== Group B ===
**Main Round**
Albin Ouschan (AUT)	9
Fabio Petroni (ITA)	5
Roberto Gomez (PHI)	9
Stewart Colclough (GBR)	8
Omar Al-Shaheen (KUW)	9
Alain Da Costa (FRA)	0
Aloysius Yapp (SGP)	9
Kaiden Hunkins (USA)	0
1st playoff round
Fabio Petroni (ITA)	7
Stewart Colclough (GBR)	9
Alain Da Costa (FRA)	8
Kaiden Hunkins (USA)	9

**Winner’s Round**
Albin Ouschan (AUT)	7
Roberto Gomez (PHI)	9
Omar Al-Shaheen (KUW)	7
Aloysius Yapp (SGP)	9
2nd playoff round
Stewart Colclough (GBR)	5
Omar Al-Shaheen (KUW)	9
Kaiden Hunkins (USA)	1
Albin Ouschan (AUT)	9

=== Group C ===
**Main Round**
Billy Thorpe (USA)	9
Francisco Gatsby (CHI)	2
Marc Vidal (USA)	9
Ivica Putnik (CRO)	5
Petri Makkonen (FIN)	9
Benjamin Belhassen (FRA)	5
Mieszko Fortuński (POL)	9
Marcel Price (GBR)	3
1st playoff round
Francisco Gatsby (CHI)	2
Ivica Putnik (CRO)	9
Benjamin Belhassen (FRA)	6
Marcel Price (GBR)	9

**Winner’s Round**
Billy Thorpe (USA)	7
Marc Vidal (USA)	9
Petri Makkonen (FIN)	3
Mieszko Fortuński (POL)	9
2nd playoff round
Ivica Putnik (CRO)	9
Petri Makkonen (FIN)	7
Marcel Price (GBR)	4
Billy Thorpe (USA)	9

=== Group D ===
**Main Round**
Thorsten Hohmann (GER)	9
Tobias Bongers (GER)	8
Mika Immonen (FIN)	9
Kristina Tkach (RUS)	4
Sanjin Pehlivanović (BIH)	9
Kevin Lannoye (BEL)	2
Ralf Souquet (GER)	6
Craig Osborne (GBR)	9
1st playoff round
Tobias Bongers (GER)	7
Kristina Tkach (RUS)	9
Kevin Lannoye (BEL)	4
Ralf Souquet (GER)	9

**Winner’s Round**
Thorsten Hohmann (GER)	9
Mika Immonen (FIN)	3
Sanjin Pehlivanović (BIH)	9
Craig Osborne (GBR)	4
2nd playoff round
Kristina Tkach (RUS)	4
Craig Osborne (GBR)	9
Ralf Souquet (GER)	9
Mika Immonen (FIN)	7

=== Group E ===
**Main Round**
Jayson Shaw (GBR)	9
Moritz Neuhausen (GER)	7
Jani Siekkinen (FIN)	8
Michal Gavenciak (CZE)	9
Ruslan Chinakhov (RUS)	9
Alex Montpellier (FRA)	7
Marc Bijsterbosch (NED)	9
Imran Majid (GBR)	6
1st playoff round
Moritz Neuhausen (GER)	9
Jani Siekkinen (FIN)	6
Alex Montpellier (FRA)	5
Imran Majid (GBR)	9

**Winner’s Round**
Jayson Shaw (GBR)	8
Michal Gavenciak (CZE)	9
Ruslan Chinakhov (RUS)	4
Marc Bijsterbosch (NED)	9
2nd playoff round
Moritz Neuhausen (GER)	9
Ruslan Chinakhov (RUS)	7
Imran Majid (GBR)	6
Jayson Shaw (GBR)	9

=== Group F ===
**Main Round**
Casper Matikainen (FIN)	3
Elliot Sanderson (GBR)	9
Mark Foster (GBR)	7
Jan van Lierop (NED)	9
Mohammad Ali Berjawi (LBN)	9
Ryan Fleming (GBR)	8
Maximilian Lechner (AUT)	9
Mickey Krause (DEN)	5
1st playoff round
Casper Matikainen (FIN)	9
Mark Foster (GBR)	3
Ryan Fleming (GBR)	5
Mickey Krause (DEN)	9

**Winner’s Round**
Elliot Sanderson (GBR)	9
Jan van Lierop (NED)	8
Mohammad Ali Berjawi (LBN)	0
Maximilian Lechner (AUT)	9
2nd playoff round
Casper Matikainen (FIN)	9
Mohammad Ali Berjawi (LBN)	7
Mickey Krause (DEN)	4
Jan van Lierop (NED)	9

=== Group G ===
**Main Round**
David Alcaide (ESP)	9
Andreja Klasovic (SRB)	3
Pijus Labutis (LTU)	8
Jeremy Sossei (USA)	9
Robbie Capito (HKG)	9
Ruben Bautista (MEX)	3
Denis Grabe (EST)	7
Vitaliy Patsura (UKR)	9
1st playoff round
Andreja Klasovic (SRB)	6
Pijus Labutis (LTU)	9
Ruben Bautista (MEX)	9
Denis Grabe (EST)	5

**Winner’s Round**
David Alcaide (ESP)	8
Jeremy Sossei (USA)	9
Robbie Capito (HKG)	9
Vitaliy Patsura (UKR)	8
2nd playoff round
Pijus Labutis (LTU)	9
Vitaliy Patsura (UKR)	3
Ruben Bautista (MEX)	7
David Alcaide (ESP)	9

=== Group H ===
**Main Round**
Skyler Woodward (USA)	9
Jaroslav Polach (SVK)	0
Radosław Babica (POL)	9
Ivo Aarts (NED)	6
Vincent Halliday (RSA)	7
DJ McGinley (CAN)	9
Daniel Schneider (SUI)	9
So Shaw (IRI)	6
1st playoff round
Jaroslav Polach (SVK)	5
Ivo Aarts (NED)	9
Vincent Halliday (RSA)	2
So Shaw (IRI)	9

**Winner’s Round**
Skyler Woodward (USA)	2
Radosław Babica (POL)	9
DJ McGinley (CAN)	5
Daniel Schneider (SUI)	9
2nd playoff round
Ivo Aarts (NED)	9
DJ McGinley (CAN)	8
So Shaw (IRI)	4
Skyler Woodward (USA)	9

=== Group I ===
**Main Round**
Shane Van Boening (USA)	9
Petr Urban (CZE)	3
Oscar Dominguez (USA)	9
Roberto Bartol (CRO)	8
Karol Skowerski (POL)	3
Jonás Souto (ESP)	9
Hunter Lombardo (USA)	9
Mats Schjetne (NOR)	3
1st playoff round
Petr Urban (CZE)	9
Roberto Bartol (CRO)	8
Karol Skowerski (POL)	9
Mats Schjetne (NOR)	1

**Winner’s Round**
Shane Van Boening (USA)	9
Oscar Dominguez (USA)	4
Jonás Souto (ESP)	6
Hunter Lombardo (USA)	9
2nd playoff round
Petr Urban (CZE)	5
Jonás Souto (ESP)	9
Karol Skowerski (POL)	9
Oscar Dominguez (USA)	3

=== Group J ===
**Main Round**
Wojciech Szewczyk (POL)	9
Marco Dorenburg (GER)	1
Richard Halliday (RSA)	6
Aleksa Pecelj (SRB)	9
Olivér Szolnoki (HUN)	9
Daniele Corrieri (ITA)	4
Francisco Sánchez Ruiz (ESP)	9
Kevin Simpson (GBR)	0
1st playoff round
Marco Dorenburg (GER)	8
Richard Halliday (RSA)	9
Daniele Corrieri (ITA)	9
Kevin Simpson (GBR)	1

**Winner’s Round**
Wojciech Szewczyk (POL)	4
Aleksa Pecelj (SRB)	8
Olivér Szolnoki (HUN)	9
Francisco Sánchez Ruiz (ESP)	8
2nd playoff round
Richard Halliday (RSA)	5
Francisco Sánchez Ruiz (ESP)	9
Daniele Corrieri (ITA)	3
Wojciech Szewczyk (POL)	9

=== Group K ===
**Main Round**
Karl Boyes (GBR)	9
Lukas Fracasso Verner (USA)	3
Stephen Holem (CAN)	8
Badar Abdullah Alawadhi (KUW)	9
Yukio Akakariyama (JPN)	9
Ricky Evans (USA)	5
Corey Deuel (USA)	9
Benji Buckley (GBR)	6
1st playoff round
Lukas Fracasso Verner (USA)	6
Stephen Holem (CAN)	9
Ricky Evans (USA)	4
Benji Buckley (GBR)	9

**Winner’s Round**
Karl Boyes (GBR)	9
Badar Abdullah Alawadhi (KUW)	8
Yukio Akakariyama (JPN)	9
Corey Deuel (USA)	4
2nd playoff round
Stephen Holem (CAN)	9
Corey Deuel (USA)	8
Benji Buckley (GBR)	5
Badar Abdullah Alawadhi (KUW)	9

=== Group L ===
**Main Round**
Darren Appleton (GBR)	9
Shane Wolford (USA)	7
Marco Teutscher (NED)	4
Christoph Reintjes (GER)	9
Ricardo Sini (ITA)	8
Jeffrey Nieuwenhuyzen (AHO)	9
Alexander Kazakis (GRE)	9
Kelly Fisher (GBR)	1
1st playoff round
Shane Wolford (USA)	6
Marco Teutscher (NED)	9
Ricardo Sini (ITA)	5
Kelly Fisher (GBR)	9

**Winner’s Round**
Darren Appleton (GBR)	9
Christoph Reintjes (GER)	2
Jeffrey Nieuwenhuyzen (AHO)	4
Alexander Kazakis (GRE)	9
2nd playoff round
Marco Teutscher (NED)	9
Jeffrey Nieuwenhuyzen (AHO)	4
Kelly Fisher (GBR)	w/o
Christoph Reintjes (GER)	w/d

=== Group M ===
**Main Round**
Niels Feijen (NED)	9
Tim de Ruyter (NED)	5
Chris Reinhold (USA)	3
Yip Kin-Ling (HKG)	9
Nick Malai (GRE)	7
Veronika Ivanovskaia (GER)	9
Masato Yoshioka (JPN)	9
Muhummed Daydat (RSA)	2
1st playoff round
Tim de Ruyter (NED)	9
Chris Reinhold (USA)	3
Nick Malai (GRE)	7
Muhummed Daydat (RSA)	9

**Winner’s Round**
Niels Feijen (NED)	9
Yip Kin-Ling (HKG)	6
Veronika Ivanovskaia (GER)	7
Masato Yoshioka (JPN)	9
2nd playoff round
Tim de Ruyter (NED)	8
Veronika Ivanovskaia (GER)	9
Muhummed Daydat (RSA)	9
Yip Kin-Ling (HKG)	2

=== Group N ===
**Main Round**
Mateusz Śniegocki (POL)	9
Miguel Silva (POR)	7
Mario He (AUT)	6
Philipp Stojanovic (CRO)	9
Jakub Koniar (SVK)	9
Vania Franco (POR)	1
Tyler Styer (USA)	9
Henrique Correia (POR)	4
1st playoff round
Miguel Silva (POR)	2
Mario He (AUT)	9
Vania Franco (POR)	7
Henrique Correia (POR)	9

**Winner’s Round**
Mateusz Śniegocki (POL)	9
Philipp Stojanovic (CRO)	4
Jakub Koniar (SVK)	9
Tyler Styer (USA)	5
2nd playoff round
Mario He (AUT)	9
Tyler Styer (USA)	3
Henrique Correia (POR)	6
Philipp Stojanovic (CRO)	9

=== Group O ===
**Main Round**
Naoyuki Ōi (JPN)	9
Jennifer Barretta (USA)	6
Roman Hybler (CZE)	7
Daniel Macioł (POL)	9
Donny Olson (USA)	8
Bahram Lotfy (DEN)	9
Chris Melling (GBR)	9
April Larson (USA)	7
1st playoff round
Jennifer Barretta (USA)	2
Roman Hybler (CZE)	9
Donny Olson (USA)	9
April Larson (USA)	6

**Winner’s Round**
Naoyuki Ōi (JPN)	2
Daniel Macioł (POL)	9
Bahram Lotfy (DEN)	3
Chris Melling (GBR)	9
2nd playoff round
Roman Hybler (CZE)	4
Bahram Lotfy (DEN)	9
Donny Olson (USA)	1
Naoyuki Ōi (JPN)	9

=== Group P ===
**Main Round**
Tomasz Kapłan (POL)	9
Sergey Lutsker (RUS)	3
Chris Alexander (GBR)	8
Nikos Ekonomopoulos (GRE)	9
Wiktor Zieliński (POL)	9
Kim Laaksonen (FIN)	0
Joshua Filler (GER)	9
Marharyta Fjafilawa (BLR)	2
1st playoff round
Sergey Lutsker (RUS)	9
Chris Alexander (GBR)	4
Kim Laaksonen (FIN)	9
Marharyta Fjafilawa (BLR)	3

**Winner’s Round**
Tomasz Kapłan (POL)	2
Nikos Ekonomopoulos (GRE)	9
Wiktor Zieliński (POL)	9
Joshua Filler (GER)	3
2nd playoff round
Sergey Lutsker (RUS)	6
Joshua Filler (GER)	9
Kim Laaksonen (FIN)	3
Tomasz Kapłan (POL)	9

=== Finals ===
**Round of 64**; June 8
Fedor Gorst (RUS)	8
**Skyler Woodward** (USA)	**11**
Konrad Juszczyszyn (POL)	8
**Bahram Lotfy** (DEN)	**11**
**Roberto Gomez** (PHI)	**11**
Muhummed Daydat (RSA)	2
**Aloysius Yapp** (SGP)	**11**
Ralf Souquet (GER)	10
Marc Vidal (USA)	2
**Mario He** (AUT)	**11**
**Mieszko Fortuński** (POL)	**11**
Ivo Aarts (NED)	4
**Thorsten Hohmann** (GER)	**11**
Stephen Holem (CAN)	8
Sanjin Pehlivanović (BIH)	7
**Albin Ouschan** (AUT)	**11**
Michal Gavenciak (CZE)	8
**Billy Thorpe** (USA)	**11**
**Marc Bijsterbosch** (NED)	**11**
Karol Skowerski (POL)	7
**Elliot Sanderson** (GBR)	**11**
Ivica Putnik (CRO)	3
**Maximilian Lechner** (AUT)	**11**
Veronika Ivanovskaia (GER)	4
**Jeremy Sossei** (USA)	**11**
Kelly Fisher (GBR)	5
**Robbie Capito** (HKG)	**11**
Craig Osborne (GBR)	5
Radosław Babica (POL)	3
**David Alcaide** (ESP)	**11**
Daniel Schneider (SUI)	7
**Philipp Stojanovic** (CRO)	**11**
Shane Van Boening (USA)	11
Jayson Shaw (GBR)	4
Hunter Lombardo (USA)	6
Pijus Labutis (LTU)	11
Aleksa Pecelj (SRB)	11
Jasmin Ouschan (AUT)	4
Olivér Szolnoki (HUN)	11
Wojciech Szewczyk (POL)	10
Karl Boyes (GBR)	11
Moritz Neuhausen (GER)	5
Yukio Akakariyama (JPN)	7
Francisco Sánchez Ruiz (ESP)	11
Darren Appleton (GBR)	8
Joshua Filler (GER)	11
Alexander Kazakis (GRE)	6
Naoyuki Ōi (JPN)	11
Niels Feijen (NED)	9
Tomasz Kapłan (POL)	11
Masato Yoshioka (JPN)	10
Jonás Souto (ESP)	11
Mateusz Śniegocki (POL)	9
Dimitri Jungo (SUI)	11
Jakub Koniar (SVK)	9
Marco Teutscher (NED)	11
Daniel Macioł (POL)	10
Omar Al-Shaheen (KUW)	11
Chris Melling (GBR)	11
Badar Abdullah Alawadhi (KUW)	9
Nikos Ekonomopoulos (GRE)	11
Jan van Lierop (NED)	2
Wiktor Zieliński (POL)	9
Casper Matikainen (FIN)	11

**Round of 32**; June 8
Skyler Woodward (USA)	11
Bahram Lotfy (DEN)	4
Roberto Gomez (PHI)	11
Aloysius Yapp (SGP)	7
Mario He (AUT)	7
Mieszko Fortuński (POL)	11
Thorsten Hohmann (GER)	7
Albin Ouschan (AUT)	11
Billy Thorpe (USA)	10
Marc Bijsterbosch (NED)	11
Elliot Sanderson (GBR)	9
Maximilian Lechner (AUT)	11
Jeremy Sossei (USA)	11
Robbie Capito (HKG)	7
David Alcaide (ESP)	11
Philipp Stojanovic (CRO)	6
Shane Van Boening (USA)	11
Pijus Labutis (LTU)	4
Aleksa Pecelj (SRB)	2
Olivér Szolnoki (HUN)	11
Karl Boyes (GBR)	3
Francisco Sánchez Ruiz (ESP)	11
Joshua Filler (GER)	6
Naoyuki Ōi (JPN)	11
Tomasz Kapłan (POL)	11
Jonás Souto (ESP)	5
Dimitri Jungo (SUI)	11
Marco Teutscher (NED)	8
Omar Al-Shaheen (KUW)	11
Chris Melling (GBR)	10
Nikos Ekonomopoulos (GRE)	11
Casper Matikainen (FIN)	5

**Last 16**; June 9
Skyler Woodward (USA)	11
Roberto Gomez (PHI)	7
Mieszko Fortuński (POL)	8
Albin Ouschan (AUT)	11
Marc Bijsterbosch (NED)	6
Maximilian Lechner (AUT)	11
Jeremy Sossei (USA)	4
David Alcaide (ESP)	11
Shane Van Boening (USA)	5
Olivér Szolnoki (HUN)	11
Francisco Sánchez Ruiz (ESP)	11
Naoyuki Ōi (JPN)	7
Tomasz Kapłan (POL)	11
Dimitri Jungo (SUI)	9
Omar Al-Shaheen (KUW)	11
Nikos Ekonomopoulos (GRE)	8

**Quarter-finals**; June 9
Skyler Woodward (USA)	5
Albin Ouschan (AUT)	11
Maximilian Lechner (AUT)	4
David Alcaide (ESP)	11
Olivér Szolnoki (HUN)	11
Francisco Sánchez Ruiz (ESP)	9
Tomasz Kapłan (POL)	6
Omar Al-Shaheen (KUW)	11

**Semi-finals**; June 10
Albin Ouschan (AUT)	11
David Alcaide (ESP)	4
Olivér Szolnoki (HUN)	9
Omar Al-Shaheen (KUW)	11

**Final**; June 10
Albin Ouschan (AUT)	13
Omar Al-Shaheen (KUW)	9

=== Grand Final ===
The final was played between Austrian Albin Ouschan and Kuwaiti Omar Al-Shaheen, with the winner breaks format. Albin Ouschan won the match 13–9 and won the 9-ball world championship for the second time.

Player	Lag	Rack																						Racks won
Player	Lag	1	2	3	4	5	6	7	8	9	10	11	12	13	14	15	16	17	18	19	20	21	22	Racks won
(Austria) **Albin Ouschan**	•	1	1	1				1		1		1			1			1	1	1	1	1	1	**13**
(Kuwait) Omar Al-Shaheen					1	1	1		1		1		1	1		1	1							**9**

== Broadcasting ==
All groups of the tournament were available worldwide via the following broadcasters:

Country	Channel
United Kingdom; Ireland	Sky Sports
United States; Canada; Brazil; Germany; Austria; Switzerland; Spain; Italy	DAZN
Russia; Belarus; Kazakhstan; Kyrgyzstan; Tajikistan; Turkmenistan; Uzbekistan	NTV
Czech Republic; Slovakia	Nova
Netherlands	RTL
New Zealand	Sky
Bosnia and Herzegovina; Croatia; North Macedonia; Montenegro; Serbia; Kosovo; Slovenia	Sport Klub
Africa	SuperSport
Scandinavia	Viasat
Iceland; Baltic states	Viaplay
Rest of the World	Matchroom Sport
