= 2019 Veldhoven Open =

9-Ball pool tournament, August 2019

Tournament information
- Dates: 1–4 August
- Venue: NH Koningshof
- City: Veldhoven
- Country: Netherlands
- Organisation: Euro Tour
- Format: Single elimination, Double elimination
- Total prize fund: €38,000
- Winner's share: €4,500

Final
- Champion: Mario He (AUT) (m); Jasmin Ouschan (AUT) (f)
- Runner-up: Denis Grabe (EST) (m); Melanie Suessenguth (GER) (f)
- Score: 9–2, 7-4

The 2019 Veldhoven Open, officially known as the 2019 Dynamic Billard Veldhoven Open, was a professional nine-ball pool tournament and the fourth Euro Tour event of 2019. It was held at the NH Koningshof in Veldhoven, Netherlands. The men's event was held from 1 to 3 August, and the women's event was held from 2 to 4 August. The event followed the Austria Open and preceded the Klagenfurt Open.

The men's defending champion was Austria's Mario He, who won the 2018 Veldhoven Open after defeating Albania's Eklent Kaçi 9–8 in the final. He defended his championship, defeating Kaçi in the first knockout round, Germany's Joshua Filler in the semi-finals and Estonia's Denis Grabe in the final 9–2. In the women's event, the defending champion was Austria's Jasmin Ouschan, who defeated Oliwia Zalewska 7–3 in the final of the previous year's event. Ouschan also successfully defended her championship, defeating Germany's Melanie Suessenguth 7–4 in the final. The event's total prize fund was €38,000, with the winner receiving €4,500.

== Tournament format ==
The event was held from 1 to 3 August for the men's event, and 2 to 4 August for the women's event. Both events were first played as a double-elimination tournament. It was held at the NH Koningshof in Veldhoven, Netherlands. The men's event became a single-elimination bracket at the round-of-32, while the women's event remained a double-elimination tournament until the round-of-16. All matches were played as race-to-nine racks.

The defending champion of the men's event was Mario He, who won the 2018 Veldhoven Open defeating Eklent Kaçi in the final. The defending champion of the women's event was Jasmin Ouschan, who defeated Oliwia Czuprynska 7–3 in the final of the previous year's event.

=== Prize fund ===
Both the men's and women's event's prize fund was similar to those of other Euro Tour events, totalling €38,000, with €4,500 being awarded to the winners of the event.

Place	Prize money
Winner	€4,500
Finalist	€3,000
Semi-finalist	€1,750
Quarter-finalist	€1,250
Last 16	€1,000
Last 32	€600
33–48	€275
Total	€38,000

== Tournament summary ==
=== Men's event ===
On 1 August 2019, the double-elimination round began at 09:00 CET. All matches were played under the alternative break format as a race-to-nine racks. The event had a total of 193 participants, including all top-16 players.

==== Double elimination ====
Defending champion Mario He received a bye in his first round match, then defeated Tobias Bongers in the first winner's round 9–4. He progressed to the round-of-32 after a playoff win over Mateusz Śniegocki. Mark Gray defeated Daniel Macioł 9–7 in the second winner's round. Maciol took a time-out when the score was tied 6–6, but played significantly worse when he returned. Gray reached the winner's playoff round, but lost to Karol Skowerski, and then in the loser's playoff to Marcel Price. Number one-ranked Euro Tour player Eklent Kaçi reached the winner's playoff round, before losing 6–9 to Sergey Lutsker. Kaçi later won his loser's playoff round match against Albin Ouschan to advance to the knockout round.

Ten-time Euro Tour event winner Niels Feijen failed to make the knockout round. He was awarded a walkover in his first round match, defeating Tim De Ruyter 9–2 before losing 6–9 to Marco Dorenburg. In the loser's side, Feijen lost his next match to 14-year-old Dutch player Yannick Pongers 8–9. Three-time world champion Oliver Ortmann also failed to progress, despite defeating fourth seed Ralf Souquet 9–6. Ortmann lost to Ruslan Chinakhov 8–9 in the winner's playoff and to Jacques Wollschlaeger 4–9 in the loser's playoff. After a playoff loss to Fedor Gorst, Souquet did not reach the knockout round either.

==== Knockout rounds ====
The round-of-32 took place on 2 August, and all subsequent rounds were played on 3 August. Syria's Mohammad Soufi reached the quarter-finals, after wins over De Ruyter and Wollschlaeger (both 9–4). Marc Bijsterbosch faced Soufi, after a 9–3 win over Radosław Babica and a whitewash of Mateusz Śniegocki. Alex Montpellier defeated Greece's Nick Malai (9–6) and Nikos Ekonomopoulos (9–5) en route to the quarter-finals. Montpellier later played Estonia's Denis Grabe, after Grabe defeated Stefan Nolle 9–4 and Ruslan Chinakhov 9–3.

Mario He also advanced to the quarter-finals. His last match in the round-of-32 was a rematch of the previous year's final against Eklent Kaçi, which he won 9–8. This match, however, was more one-sided, with He winning 9–4. Poland's Konrad Juszczyszyn defeated 1999 World Pool Masters champion Alex Lely 9–4. Mario He defeated Juszczyszyn 9–6 to reach the quarter-finals. Olivér Szolnoki also reached the quarter-finals, after 9–6 victories over Moritz Neuhausen and Jakub Koniar.

Francisco Sánchez Ruiz defeated Damianos Giallourakis in the round-of-32, following Giallourakis's best run in a Euro Tour event, reaching the quarter-final at the Austria Open earlier in the season. However, Sanchez-Ruiz was eliminated in the round-of-16, after losing to Fedor Gorst 4–9. Reigning world nine-ball champion Joshua Filler advanced to the quarter-finals after defeating Marcel Price and Serbia's Aleksa Pecelj.

Marc Bijsterbosch defeated Mohamad Soufi 9–2 to advance to the semi-final. Denis Grabe defeated Alex Montpellier 9–1, with Montpellier only winning rack four. Both Mario He and Joshua Filler progressed to the semi-finals following victories over Olivér Szolnoki and Fedor Gorst, respectively. With the victory, Filler was guaranteed to regain the top spot in the Euro Tour rankings, which was previously held by Eklent Kaçi.

The first semi-final match was held between Bijsterbosch and Grabe at 14:30 EST. Bijsterbosch took an early lead, gaining an advantage at 4–2, 5–3, and 7–5. However, Grabe fought back to tie the match 7–7. He won the final two racks (four in total) to win 9–7 and reach the final. The second semi-final was held between He and Filler at 16:00 EST. The match was tight, with a difference of no more than a one rack between the two players throughout. At 7–7, Filler reached the hill, on his own break, with He taking the match to hill-hill at 8–8. Filler's break on the decider was a dry break, allowing He to run the rack to win the frame and the match.

The final was played at 18:00 EST between defending champion Mario He and Denis Grabe. Grabe was a two-time champion of Euro Tour events, having won the 2014 Slovenia Open and 2014 Austria Open. Mario He was a four-time champion, having won two events in 2018. The match took place on He's birthday. The final was one-sided, with He taking an early lead at 5–1. Grabe won rack seven, but He won the next four racks to win the match and the championship 9–2.

=== Women's event ===
The women's event was held between 2 and 4 August 2019, with a total of 59 participants. The event was a double-elimination bracket. With 16 players remaining, the event reverted to a single-elimination structure. Jasmin Ouschan and Kristina Tkach were tied for number one in the women's Euro Tour rankings. Last year's runner-up Oliwia Czuprynska lost to Tina Vogelmann 4–7 in the double-elimination round, and then lost to Tkach 7–1 in the loser's qualification round. Germany's Melanie Suessenguth had already defeated Tkach 7–5 in the winner's round. In a match that was predicted to be a close match, Ukraine's Kateryna Polovinchuk defeated Valeriia Trushevskaia 7–1.

The knockout round saw a repeat of the Austria Open final, with Ouschan facing Marharyta Fefilava. The match finished with the same scoreline, with Ouschan winning the match 7–1. Tkach also defeated Diana Stateczny 7–6 in the round-of-16, but lost to Tina Vogelmann 7–4 in the quarter-finals. Ouschan won her quarter-final match against Diana Khodjaeva 7–1 to guarantee securing the number one spot in the rankings. Veronika Hubrtová also advanced to the semi-finals after defeating Yvonne Ullmann-Hybler in the round-of-16 and Germany's Ina Kaplan in the quarter-finals (both 7–4). Melanie Suessenguth reached the semi-finals after wins over Christine Steinlage and Natalia Seroshtan.

The semi-finals were played on 4 August, with Ouschan and Suessenguth progressing. Ouschan defeated Vogelmann 7–3, and Suessenguth defeated Hubrtová 7–5. Sussenguth was playing in her first final, whilst Ouschan had previously played in 20 finals. Ouschan won the final 7–4, successfully defending her title. In her six matches in the tournament, Ouschan conceded just 14 racks, winning 47. A strong break off shot was cited as a reason for her dominance in the event.

== Tournament results ==
=== Men's event ===
The following matches are from the round of 32 onward. Players in bold denote match winners.

1st Round
Sergey Lutsker (SLO)	7
**Jacques Wollschlaeger (GER)**	**9**
Tim De Ruyter (NED)	4
**Mohammad Soufi (SYR)**	**9**
**Marc Bijsterbosch (NED)**	**9**
Radosław Babica (POL)	3
**Mateusz Śniegocki (POL)**	**9**
Karol Skowerski (POL)	5
Nick Malai (GRE)	6
**Alex Montpellier (ITA)**	**9**
**Nikos Ekonomopoulos (GRE)**	**9**
Alexander Kazakis (GRE)	4
**Denis Grabe (EST)**	**9**
Stefan Nolle (GER)	4
Ivar Saris (NED)	2
**Ruslan Chinakhov (RUS)**	**9**
**Mario He (AUT)**	**9**
Eklent Kaçi (ALB)	4
Alex Lely (NED)	4
**Konrad Juszczyszyn (POL)**	**9**
Moritz Neuhausen (GER)	6
**Jakub Koniar (CRO)**	**9**
**Olivér Szolnoki (HUN)**	**9**
Pijus Labutis (LIT)	5
**Francisco Sánchez Ruiz (ESP)**	**9**
Damianos Giallourakis (GRE)	5
**Fedor Gorst (RUS)**	**9**
Wiktor Zieliński (POL)	7
Maksim Dudanets (RUS)	7
**Aleksa Pecelj (SER)**	**9**
Marcel Price (WAL)	6
**Joshua Filler (GER)**	**9**

2nd Round
(Germany) Jacques Wollschlaeger	4
**(Syria) Mohammad Soufi**	**9**
**(Netherlands) Marc Bijsterbosch**	9
(Poland) Mateusz Śniegocki	0
**(Italy) Alex Montpellier**	**9**
(Greece) Nikos Ekonomopoulos	5
**(Estonia) Denis Grabe**	**9**
(Russia) Ruslan Chinakhov	3
**(Austria) Mario He**	**9**
(Poland) Konrad Juszczyszyn	6
(Croatia) Jakub Koniar	6
**(Hungary) Olivér Szolnoki**	**9**
(Spain) Francisco Sánchez Ruiz	4
**(Russia) Fedor Gorst**	**9**
(Serbia) Aleksa Pecelj	6
**(Germany) Joshua Filler**	**9**

Quarterfinals
(Syria) Mohammad Soufi	2
**(Netherlands) Marc Bijsterbosch**	**9**
(Italy) Alex Montpellier	1
**(Estonia) Denis Grabe**	**9**
**(Austria) Mario He**	**9**
(Hungary) Olivér Szolnoki	6
(Russia) Fedor Gorst	4
**(Germany) Joshua Filler**	**9**

Semifinals
(Netherlands) Marc Bijsterbosch	7
**(Estonia) Denis Grabe**	**9**
Finals
(Estonia) Denis Grabe	2
**(Austria) Mario He**	**9**
**(Austria) Mario He**	**9**
(Germany) Joshua Filler	8

=== Women's event ===
The following matches are from the round of 16 stage onward. Players in bold denote match winners.

First round
**Jasmin Ouschan (AUT)**	**7**
Marharyta Fefilava (BLR)	1
Kateryna Polovinchuk (UKR)	2
**Diana Khodjaeva (BEL)**	**7**
Diana Stateczny (GER)	6
**Kristina Tkach (RUS)**	**7**
**Tina Vogelmann (GER)**	**7**
Ine Helvik (NOR)	2
Yvonne Ullmann-Hybler (GER)	4
**Veronika Hubrtová (CZE)**	**7**
Louise Furberg (SWE)	5
**Ina Kaplan (GER)**	**7**
**Natalia Seroshtan (RUS)**	**7**
Vaia Franco (CZE)	5
**Melanie Suessenguth (GER)**	**7**
Christine Steinlage (GER)	5

Quarter-finals
**(Austria) Jasmin Ouschan**	**7**
(Belgium) Diana Khodjaeva	1
(Russia) Kristina Tkach	4
**(Germany) Tina Vogelmann**	**7**
**(Czech Republic) Veronika Hubrtová**	**7**
**(Germany) Ina Kaplan**	4
(Russia) Natalia Seroshtan	4
**(Germany) Melanie Suessenguth**	**7**

Semi-finals
**(Austria) Jasmin Ouschan**	**7**
(Germany) Tina Vogelmann	3
(Czech Republic) Veronika Hubrtová	5
**(Germany) Melanie Suessenguth**	**7**

Final
**(Austria) Jasmin Ouschan**	**7**
(Germany) Melanie Suessenguth	4
