= 2017 Italian Open (pool) =

Italian 2017 pool tournament

Dynamic Billiard Italian Open

Tournament information
- Dates: 23–26 February 2017
- Venue: Best Western Premier BHR Treviso Hotel
- City: Treviso
- Country: Italy
- Organisation: Euro Tour
- Format: Single Elimination
- Total prize fund: €36,000
- Winner's share: €4,500

Final
- Champion: (Germany) Ralf Souquet
- Runner-up: (Russia) Ruslan Chinakhov
- Score: 9-5

The 2017 Dynamic Italian Open, was the first Euro Tour 9-Ball pool event in 2017. The event was won by Germany's Ralf Souquet who defeated Russia's Ruslan Chinakhov 9–5 in the final. In winning the event, Souquet won his twenty-second Euro Tour event.

== Tournament format ==
The event saw a total of 187 players compete, in a double-elimination knockout tournament, until the last 32 stage; where the tournament was contested as single elimination.

=== Prize fund ===
The tournament prize fund will be similar to that of other Euro Tour events, with €4,500 for the winner of the event.

	Prize money
Winner	4.500 €
Finalist	€3.000
Semifinalist	€1.750
Quarterfinalist	€1.250
last 16	€1.000
Last 32	€500
33–48 Place	€250
Total	€36.000

== Tournament results ==
1st Round
(Poland) Wojciech Sroczyński	2
(Russia) Ruslan Tschinachow	9
(Russia) Sergei Luzker	9
(Germany) Joshua Filler	8
(United States) Shane Van Boening	9
(England) Mark Gray	3
(Portugal) Miguel Silva	1
(Austria) Mario He	9
(Germany) Manuel Ederer	7
(Poland) Konrad Juszczyszyn	9
(Finland) Mika Immonen	6
(Austria) Albin Ouschan	9
(Estonia) Denis Grabe	9
(Russia) Fedor Gorst	3
(Albania) Eklent Kaçi	6
(Poland) Mieszko Fortuński	9
(Netherlands) Ivo Aarts	9
(Greece) Alexander Kazakis	5
(Greece) Evangelos Vettas	6
(Netherlands) Nick van den Berg	9
(Netherlands) Marco Teutscher	8
(England) Daryl Peach	9
(England) Imran Majid	9
(Poland) Wojciech Szewczyk	7
(Greece) Damianos Giallourakis	9
(Denmark) Bahram Lotfy	4
(Netherlands) Niels Feijen	9
(Spain) Francisco Sánchez	6
(Netherlands) Ivar Saris	8
(Germany) Ralf Souquet	9
(Germany) Sebastian Ludwig	6
(Russia) Konstantin Stepanov	9

2nd Round
(Russia) Ruslan Tschinachow	9
(Russia) Sergei Luzker	4
(United States) Shane Van Boening	8
(Austria) Mario He	9
(Poland) Konrad Juszczyszyn	4
(Austria) Albin Ouschan	9
(Estonia) Denis Grabe	9
(Poland) Mieszko Fortuński	7
(Netherlands) Ivo Aarts	6
(Netherlands) Nick van den Berg	9
(England) Daryl Peach	9
(England) Imran Majid	6
(Greece) Damianos Giallourakis	9
(Netherlands) Niels Feijen	6
(Germany) Ralf Souquet	9
(Russia) Konstantin Stepanov	7

Quarterfinals
(Russia) Ruslan Tschinachow	9
(Austria) Mario He	4
(Austria) Albin Ouschan	4
(Estonia) Denis Grabe	9
(Netherlands) Nick van den Berg	5
(England) Daryl Peach	9
(Greece) Damianos Giallourakis	6
(Germany) Ralf Souquet	9

Semifinals
(Russia) Ruslan Tschinachow	9
(Estonia) Denis Grabe	3
(England) Daryl Peach	7
(Germany) Ralf Souquet	9

Finals
(Russia) Ruslan Tschinachow	5
(Germany) Ralf Souquet	9
