= 2018 Italian Open (pool) =

9-ball pool tournament

Dynamic Billiard Treviso Open
Tournament information
- Dates: 1–3 March 2018
- Venue: BHR Treviso Hotel,
- City: Treviso
- Country: Italy
- Organisation: Euro Tour
- Format: Single Elimination
- Total prize fund: €36,000
- Winner's share: €4,500

Final
- Champion: (Albania) Eklent Kaçi
- Runner-up: (Austria) Albin Ouschan
- Score: 9-5

The 2018 Dynamic Billiard Treviso Open, was the first Euro Tour 9-Ball pool event in 2018. The event was won by Albania's Eklent Kaçi who defeated Austria's Albin Ouschan 9–5 in the final. This was Kaci's first Euro Tour victory.

2017's Treviso Open champion Wiktor Zieliński lost in the last 32 of the event against Sergei Luzker. Top Euro Tour players, such as 2017 Overall winner Ralf Souquet did not compete at the event, as the event was held at the same time as the 2018 World Pool Masters. The event is not to be confused with the 2018 Treviso Open; another event held in the Euro Tour in November.

== Tournament format ==
The event saw a total of 153 players compete, in a double-elimination knockout tournament, until the last 32 stage; where the tournament was contested as single elimination.

=== Prize fund ===
	Prize money
Winner	4.500 €
Finalist	€3.000
Semi-finalist	€1.750
Quarter-finalist	€1.250
Last 16	€1.000
Last 32	€500
33rd–48th Places	€250
Total prizes	€36.000

== Tournament results ==
Round of 32
(Austria) Mario He	9
(Poland) Michał Turkowski	5
(Austria) Maximilian Lechner	9
(Poland) Tomasz Kapłan	1
(Belgium) Cliff Castelein	9
(Spain) Albert Casellas-Planas	7
(Spain) Francisco Díaz-Pizarro	9
(Poland) Mieszko Fortuński	4
(Portugal) Miguel Silva	7
(Poland) Mateusz Śniegocki	9
(Albania) Eklent Kaçi	9
(Greece) Alexander Kazakis	7
(Poland) Wojciech Szewczyk	8
(Albania) Edmond Zaja	9
(United Kingdom) Mark Gray	2
(Spain) Francisco Sánchez	9
(Bosnia and Herzegovina) Sanjin Pehlivanović	9
(Poland) Piotr Ostrowski	2
(Poland) Wiktor Zieliński	2
(Russia) Sergei Luzker	9
(Netherlands) Ivo Aarts	6
(Austria) Albin Ouschan	9
(Italy) Daniele Corrieri	2
(Poland) Wojciech Sroczyński	9
(Russia) Fedor Gorst	9
(Italy) Gianmarco Tonini	2
(Netherlands) Marc Bijsterbosch	5
(Russia) Konstantin Stepanov	9
(Germany) Sebastian Ludwig	3
(Russia) Andrei Seroschtan	9
(United Kingdom) Imran Majid	9
(Slovakia) Jakub Koniar	5

Last 16
(Austria) Mario He	8
(Austria) Maximilian Lechner	9
(Belgium) Cliff Castelein	6
(Spain) Francisco Díaz-Pizarro	9
(Poland) Mateusz Śniegocki	4
(Albania) Eklent Kaçi	9
(Albania) Edmond Zaja	5
(Spain) Francisco Sánchez	9
(Bosnia and Herzegovina) Sanjin Pehlivanović	8
(Russia) Sergei Luzker	9
(Austria) Albin Ouschan	9
(Poland) Wojciech Sroczyński	7
(Russia) Fedor Gorst	6
(Russia) Konstantin Stepanov	9
(Russia) Andrei Seroschtan	7
(United Kingdom) Imran Majid	9

Quarterfinal
(Austria) Maximilian Lechner	5
(Spain) Francisco Díaz-Pizarro	9
(Albania) Eklent Kaçi	9
(Spain) Francisco Sánchez	6
(Russia) Sergei Luzker	8
(Austria) Albin Ouschan	9
(Russia) Konstantin Stepanov	8
(United Kingdom) Imran Majid	9

Semifinal
(Spain) Francisco Díaz-Pizarro	4
(Albania) Eklent Kaçi	9
(Austria) Albin Ouschan	9
(United Kingdom) Imran Majid	7

Final
(Albania) Eklent Kaçi	9
(Austria) Albin Ouschan	5
