= 2017 WPA World Nine-ball Championship =

World Pool Association contest

WPA World 9-Ball Championship 2017
Tournament information
- Sport: 9-ball
- Location: al-Arabi Sports Club, Doha, Qatar
- Dates: December 9, 2017–December 14, 2017
- Tournament format: Double elimination / Single elimination
- Host: WPA World Nine-ball Championship
- Participants: 128

Final positions
- Champion: (Philippines) Carlo Biado
- Runner-up: (Philippines) Roland Garcia

The 2017 WPA World Nine-ball Championship was the 26th edition of the 9-Ball pool World Championships. It took place from December 9–14, 2017 in the al-Attiya Sports Arena of the Al-Arabi Sports Club in Doha. The Qatari capital served as the venue for the 9-Ball Championships for the eighth time in a row.

The championship was won by Filipino Carlo Biado, who defeated his compatriot Roland Garcia 13–5 in the final. Third place went to Wu Kun-lin from Taiwan and fourth to Eklent Kaçi from Albania. The defending champion was the Austrian Albin Ouschan, who lost in the second round against Kun-lin. The world champion, Chang Jung-lin, was defeated in the first round of the finals by the Canadian John Morra.

== Qualification ==
The tournament was attended by 128 players. Twenty-four players qualified for the world rankings. A total of 92 starting places were awarded according to a quota by the continental and regional associations as well as the hosting Qatari association and the sponsors. From December 5–7, 2017, a qualifying tournament was held, in which 96 participants in three knockout competitions played off the remaining 12 starting positions.

In the main tournament, the 128 participants were first divided into 16 groups of 8 players, in which they competed in the double knockout system from December 9–11. Four players of each group qualified for the final round, which took place from December 12 to 14 and was played in the knockout system.

== Tournament bracket ==
=== Preliminary round ===
==== Group 1 ====
Main Round
(Chinese Taipei) Chang Jung-lin	9
(Australia) James Georgiadis	7
(Argentina) Jorge Llanos	8
(Philippines) Francisco Felicilda	9
(Chinese Taipei) Chang Yu-lung	9
(Hong Kong) Kong Bu Hong	5
(Iran) Takhti Zarekani	8
(Poland) Mateusz Śniegocki	9
1st playoff round
(Australia) James Georgiadis	7
(Argentina) Jorge Llanos	9
(Hong Kong) Kong Bu Hong	5
(Iran) Takhti Zarekani	9

Winner’s Round
(Chinese Taipei) Chang Jung-lin	9
(Philippines) Francisco Felicilda	8
(Chinese Taipei) Chang Yu-lung	9
(Poland) Mateusz Śniegocki	5
2nd playoff round
(Argentina) Jorge Llanos	3
(Poland) Mateusz Śniegocki	9
(Iran) Takhti Zarekani	1
(Philippines) Francisco Felicilda	9

==== Group 2 ====
Main Round
(Philippines) Johann Chua	9
(Iran) Hassan Zeraatgar	4
(Morocco) Zine el-Abidine Cherif	1
(Venezuela) Jalal al-Sarisi	9
(Poland) Mieszko Fortuński	9
(Myanmar) Maung Maung	3
(Japan) Tomoo Takano	6
(Spain) Francisco Sánchez	9
1st playoff round
(Iran) Hassan Zeraatgar	9
(Morocco) Zine el-Abidine Cherif	6
(Myanmar) Maung Maung	9
(Japan) Tomoo Takano	6

Winner’s Round
(Philippines) Johann Chua	8
(Venezuela) Jalal al-Sarisi	9
(Poland) Mieszko Fortuński	5
(Spain) Francisco Sánchez	9
2nd playoff round
(Iran) Hassan Zeraatgar	7
(Poland) Mieszko Fortuński	9
(Myanmar) Maung Maung	9
(Philippines) Johann Chua	3

==== Group 3 ====
Main Round
(Philippines) Jeff De Luna	9
(Algeria) Mohamed el-Raousti	1
(Qatar) Muzammil Hussain	9
(South Korea) Lee Jun-ho	7
(South Korea) Ryu Seung-woo	6
(Kuwait) Bader al-Awadhi	9
(Singapore) Keng Kwang Chan	9
(Finland) Mika Immonen	6
1st playoff round
(Algeria) Mohamed el-Raousti	1
(South Korea) Lee Jun-ho	9
(South Korea) Ryu Seung-woo	9
(Finland) Mika Immonen	5

Winner’s Round
(Philippines) Jeff De Luna	9
(Qatar) Muzammil Hussain	3
(Kuwait) Bader al-Awadhi	7
(Singapore) Keng Kwang Chan	9
2nd playoff round
(South Korea) Lee Jun-ho	7
(Kuwait) Bader al-Awadhi	9
(South Korea) Ryu Seung-woo	9
(Qatar) Muzammil Hussain	5

==== Group 4 ====
Main Round
(Philippines) Warren Kiamco	9
(South Africa) Jason Theron	3
(Kuwait) Majed Alazmi	3
(Russia) Konstantin Stepanov	9
(United States) Robert Hart	3
(Philippines) Jeffrey Ignacio	9
(Singapore) Teck Goh Chin	5
(China) Dang Jinhu	9
1st playoff round
(South Africa) Jason Theron	8
(Kuwait) Majed Alazmi	9
(United States) Robert Hart	4
(Singapore) Teck Goh Chin	9

Winner’s Round
(Philippines) Warren Kiamco	7
(Russia) Konstantin Stepanov	9
(Philippines) Jeffrey Ignacio	9
(China) Dang Jinhu	6
2nd playoff round
(Kuwait) Majed Alazmi	0
(China) Dang Jinhu	9
(Singapore) Teck Goh Chin	6
(Philippines) Warren Kiamco	9

==== Group 5 ====
Main Round
(Chinese Taipei) Ko Pin-yi	9
(Kuwait) Fawaz al-Rashedi	6
(Vietnam) Lưu Minh Phúc	9
(Morocco) Farhat Bouchaib	2
(Poland) Wojciech Szewczyk	8
(Sweden) Christian Sparrenlöv	9
(Bangladesh) Ahmed Tanvir	0
(Netherlands) Niels Feijen	9
1st playoff round
(Kuwait) Fawaz al-Rashedi	9
(Morocco) Farhat Bouchaib	3
(Poland) Wojciech Szewczyk	9
(Bangladesh) Ahmed Tanvir	6

Winner’s Round
(Chinese Taipei) Ko Pin-yi	9
(Vietnam) Lưu Minh Phúc	8
(Sweden) Christian Sparrenlöv	9
(Netherlands) Niels Feijen	8
2nd playoff round
(Kuwait) Fawaz al-Rashedi	6
(Netherlands) Niels Feijen	9
(Poland) Wojciech Szewczyk	9
(Vietnam) Lưu Minh Phúc	7

==== Group 6 ====
Main Round
(China) Han Haoxiang	2
(Jordan) Ahmad Naiem	9
(Greece) Nick Malai	9
(United States) Hunter Lombardo	7
(China) Kong Dejing	9
(India) Dharminder Lilly	6
(Greece) Damianos Giallourakis	6
(Germany) Joshua Filler	9
1st playoff round
(China) Han Haoxiang	9
(United States) Hunter Lombardo	4
(India) Dharminder Lilly	2
(Greece) Damianos Giallourakis	9

Winner’s Round
(Jordan) Ahmad Naiem	7
(Greece) Nick Malai	9
(China) Kong Dejing	6
(Germany) Joshua Filler	9
2nd playoff round
(China) Han Haoxiang	5
(China) Kong Dejing	9
(Greece) Damianos Giallourakis	8
(Jordan) Ahmad Naiem	9

==== Group 7 ====
Main Round
(Canada) Alex Pagulayan	8
(Japan) Yukio Akakariyama	9
(Lebanon) Mohammad Berjawi	7
(Hong Kong) Lo Ho Sum	9
(Russia) Maxim Dudanez	4
(Austria) Maximilian Lechner	9
(India) Aayush Kumar	6
(Philippines) Roland Garcia	9
1st playoff round
(Canada) Alex Pagulayan	7
(Lebanon) Mohammad Berjawi	9
(Russia) Maxim Dudanez	9
(India) Aayush Kumar	5

Winner’s Round
(Japan) Yukio Akakariyama	7
(Hong Kong) Lo Ho Sum	9
(Austria) Maximilian Lechner	9
(Philippines) Roland Garcia	5
2nd playoff round
(Lebanon) Mohammad Berjawi	6
(Philippines) Roland Garcia	9
(Russia) Maxim Dudanez	9
(Japan) Yukio Akakariyama	7

==== Group 8 ====
Main Round
(Austria) Mario He	9
(Chinese Taipei) Tao Ying Duo	3
(Vietnam) Dương Quốc Hoàng	9
(Chinese Taipei) Lo Li-wen	6
(Canada) Martin Daigle	9
(Lebanon) Mazin Berjawi	5
(Poland) Wiktor Zieliński	3
(Chinese Taipei) Cheng Yu-hsuan	9
1st playoff round
(Chinese Taipei) Tao Ying Duo	4
(Chinese Taipei) Lo Li-wen	9
(Lebanon) Mazin Berjawi	3
(Poland) Wiktor Zieliński	9

Winner’s Round
(Austria) Mario He	8
(Vietnam) Dương Quốc Hoàng	9
(Canada) Martin Daigle	9
(Chinese Taipei) Cheng Yu-hsuan	7
2nd playoff round
(Chinese Taipei) Lo Li-wen	9
(Chinese Taipei) Cheng Yu-hsuan	6
(Poland) Wiktor Zieliński	9
(Austria) Mario He	8

==== Group 9 ====
Main Round
(Austria) Albin Ouschan	9
(Qatar) Abdulatif Alfawal	5
(Chinese Taipei) Hsieh Chia-chen	9
(Iran) Mohammadali Pordel	5
(China) Wang Can	5
(Chinese Taipei) Nien Rong-chih	9
(Russia) Fyodor Gorst	5
(China) Liu Haitao	9
1st playoff round
(Qatar) Abdulatif Alfawal	5
(Iran) Mohammadali Pordel	9
(China) Wang Can	7
(Russia) Fyodor Gorst	9

Winner’s Round
(Austria) Albin Ouschan	9
(Chinese Taipei) Hsieh Chia-chen	5
(Chinese Taipei) Nien Rong-chih	5
(China) Liu Haitao	9
2nd playoff round
(Iran) Mohammadali Pordel	8
(Chinese Taipei) Nien Rong-chih	9
(Russia) Fyodor Gorst	3
(Chinese Taipei) Hsieh Chia-chen	9

==== Group 10 ====
Main Round
(Germany) Ralf Souquet	9
(Qatar) Ali al-Obaidly	2
(Hong Kong) Ip Tung Pong	2
(Czech Republic) Roman Hybler	9
(Iran) Ali Maghsoud	2
(Poland) Tomasz Kapłan	9
(Vietnam) Nguyễn Anh Tuấn	8
(Russia) Ruslan Chinakhov	9
1st playoff round
(Qatar) Ali al-Obaidly	9
(Hong Kong) Ip Tung Pong	4
(Iran) Ali Maghsoud	6
(Vietnam) Nguyễn Anh Tuấn	9

Winner’s Round
(Germany) Ralf Souquet	7
(Czech Republic) Roman Hybler	9
(Poland) Tomasz Kapłan	9
(Russia) Ruslan Chinakhov	8
2nd playoff round
(Qatar) Ali al-Obaidly	5
(Russia) Ruslan Chinakhov	9
(Vietnam) Nguyễn Anh Tuấn	9
(Germany) Ralf Souquet	7

==== Group 11 ====
Main Round
(Greece) Alexander Kazakis	9
(Algeria) Nadim Okbani	2
(Germany) Sebastian Ludwig	9
(Qatar) Waleed Majid	1
(Japan) Hiroshi Takenaka	2
(China) Chu Bingjie	9
(Maldives) Mohammed Hassan	2
(Albania) Eklent Kaçi	9
1st playoff round
(Algeria) Nadim Okbani	2
(Qatar) Waleed Majid	9
(Japan) Hiroshi Takenaka	9
(Maldives) Mohammed Hassan	2

Winner’s Round
(Greece) Alexander Kazakis	9
(Germany) Sebastian Ludwig	7
(China) Chu Bingjie	6
(Albania) Eklent Kaçi	9
2nd playoff round
(Qatar) Waleed Majid	1
(China) Chu Bingjie	9
(Japan) Hiroshi Takenaka	9
(Germany) Sebastian Ludwig	8

==== Group 12 ====
Main Round
(Spain) David Alcaide	9
(Qatar) Mhanaa al-Obaidly	0
(Maldives) Hashim Ahusanu	2
(Poland) Radosław Babica	9
(Bangladesh) Md al-Amin	9
(Japan) Tōru Kuribayashi	8
(Portugal) Henrique Correia	5
(Chinese Taipei) Ko Ping-chung	9
1st playoff round
(Qatar) Mhanaa al-Obaidly	9
(Maldives) Hashim Ahusanu	4
(Japan) Tōru Kuribayashi	8
(Portugal) Henrique Correia	9

Winner’s Round
(Spain) David Alcaide	4
(Poland) Radosław Babica	9
(Bangladesh) Md al-Amin	5
(Chinese Taipei) Ko Ping-chung	9
2nd playoff round
(Qatar) Mhanaa al-Obaidly	0
(Bangladesh) Md al-Amin	9
(Portugal) Henrique Correia	5
(Spain) David Alcaide	9

==== Group 13 ====
Main Round
(Philippines) Carlo Biado	9
(China) Xu Xiaocong	6
(South Korea) Kwon Hojun	8
(South Africa) Richard Halliday	9
(Japan) Hayato Hijikata	9
(Portugal) Samuel Santos	5
(Libya) Osama Anga	1
(Estonia) Denis Grabe	9
1st playoff round
(China) Xu Xiaocong	9
(South Korea) Kwon Hojun	2
(Portugal) Samuel Santos	9
(Libya) Osama Anga	3

Winner’s Round
(Philippines) Carlo Biado	9
(South Africa) Richard Halliday	4
(Japan) Hayato Hijikata	9
(Estonia) Denis Grabe	4
2nd playoff round
(China) Xu Xiaocong	9
(Estonia) Denis Grabe	8
(Portugal) Samuel Santos	9
(South Africa) Richard Halliday	4

==== Group 14 ====
Main Round
(Chinese Taipei) Wu Kun-lin	9
(Chinese Taipei) Li Si-yu	7
(Algeria) Abderrahmane Mebarki	3
(Finland) Petri Makkonen	9
(Qatar) Bashar Hussain	8
(Iraq) Abdulkhizar Hasanin	9
(Lithuania) Pijus Labutis}	9
(Germany) Thorsten Hohmann	3
1st playoff round
(Chinese Taipei) Li Si-yu	9
(Algeria) Abderrahmane Mebarki	0
(Qatar) Bashar Hussain	6
(Germany) Thorsten Hohmann	9

Winner's Round
(Chinese Taipei) Wu Kun-lin	9
(Finland) Petri Makkonen	7
(Iraq) Abdulkhizar Hasanin	4
(Lithuania) Pijus Labutis	9
2nd playoff round
(Chinese Taipei) Li Si-yu	9
(Iraq) Abdulkhizar Hasanin	6
(Germany) Thorsten Hohmann	9
(Finland) Petri Makkonen	7

==== Group 15 ====
Main Round
(Japan) Naoyuki Ōi	9
(Sweden) Daniel Tångudd	3
(Kuwait) Mohammed Alkhashawi	4
(Canada) John Morra	9
(Netherlands) Marco Teutscher	9
(Argentina) Ariel Casto	5
(Chinese Taipei) Yang Ching-shun	5
(China) Wu Jia-qing	9
1st playoff round
(Sweden) Daniel Tångudd	9
(Kuwait) Mohammed Alkhashawi	3
(Argentina) Ariel Casto	9
(Chinese Taipei) Yang Ching-shun	6

Winner’s Round
(Japan) Naoyuki Ōi	9
(Canada) John Morra	8
(Netherlands) Marco Teutscher	9
(China) Wu Jia-qing	2
2nd playoff round
(Sweden) Daniel Tångudd	9
(China) Wu Jia-qing	5
(Argentina) Ariel Casto	5
(Canada) John Morra	9

==== Group 16 ====
Main Round
(Chinese Taipei) Liu Cheng-chieh	9
(Philippines) Israel Rota	6
(South Africa) Jeremiah Naidoo	5
(Poland) Konrad Juszczyszyn	9
(Kuwait) Abdullah al-Yousef	5
(Peru) Gerson Martínez	9
(Germany) André Lackner	9
(Kuwait) Meshaal al-Murdhi	6
1st playoff round
(Philippines) Israel Rota	9
(South Africa) Jeremiah Naidoo	1
(Kuwait) Abdullah al-Yousef	9
(Kuwait) Meshaal al-Murdhi	8

Winner’s Round
(Chinese Taipei) Liu Cheng-chieh	9
(Poland) Konrad Juszczyszyn	7
(Peru) Gerson Martínez	9
(Germany) André Lackner	8
2nd playoff round
(Philippines) Israel Rota	9
(Germany) André Lackner	4
(Kuwait) Abdullah al-Yousef	9
(Poland) Konrad Juszczyszyn	3

=== Final round ===
Round of 64
(Austria) Albin Ouschan	11
(Kuwait) Abdullah al-Yousef	6
(Portugal) Samuel Santos	10
(South Korea) Ryu Seung-woo	11
(Philippines) Warren Kiamco	11
(China) Kong Dejing	4
(Japan) Hiroshi Takenaka	4
(Chinese Taipei) Wu Kun-lin	11
(Greece) Alexander Kazakis	8
(Kuwait) Bader al-Awadhi	11
(Canada) Martin Daigle	8
(Chinese Taipei) Hsieh Chia-chen	11
(Chinese Taipei) Chang Yu-lung	11
(Poland) Mieszko Fortuński	8
(China) Xu Xiaocong	5
(Germany) Thorsten Hohmann	11
(Philippines) Carlo Biado	11
(Sweden) Daniel Tångudd	6
(Poland) Tomasz Kapłan	11
(Poland) Wojciech Szewczyk	9
(Philippines) Jeffrey Ignacio	11
(Hong Kong) Lo Ho Sum	4
(Philippines) Francisco Felicilda	11
(Japan) Naoyuki Ōi	7
(Spain) Francisco Sánchez	11
(Peru) Gerson Martínez	6
(Philippines) Israel Rota	3
(China) Liu Haitao	11
(Poland) Radosław Babica	11
(Chinese Taipei) Li Si-yu	8
(Lithuania) Pijus Labutis	10
(Chinese Taipei) Ko Ping-chung	11
(Chinese Taipei) Ko Pin-yi	11
(Austria) Maximilian Lechner	3
(Chinese Taipei) Nien Rong-chih	11
(Japan) Hayato Hijikata	10
(Netherlands) Niels Feijen	11
(Singapore) Keng Kwang Chan	9
(Bangladesh) Md al-Amin	4
(Philippines) Roland Garcia	11
(Russia) Ruslan Chinakhov	6
(Venezuela) Jalal al-Sarisi	11
(Vietnam) Dương Quốc Hoàng	11
(Chinese Taipei) Liu Cheng-chieh	10
(Chinese Taipei) Lo Li-wen	11
(Vietnam) Nguyễn Anh Tuấn	7
(Sweden) Christian Sparrenlöv	8
(China) Dang Jinhu	11
(Philippines) Jeff De Luna	11
(Russia) Maxim Dudanez	7
(Myanmar) Maung Maung	11
(China) Chu Bingjie	8
(Poland) Mateusz Śniegocki	11
(Greece) Nick Malai	10
(Jordan) Ahmad Naiem	7
(Germany) Joshua Filler	11
(Albania) Eklent Kaçi	11
(Czech Republic) Roman Hybler	6
(Poland) Wiktor Zieliński	5
(Spain) David Alcaide	11
(Russia) Konstantin Stepanov	11
(Netherlands) Marco Teutscher	7
(Canada) John Morra	11
(Chinese Taipei) Chang Jung-lin	9

Round of 32
(Austria) Albin Ouschan	11
(South Korea) Ryu Seung-woo	9
(Philippines) Warren Kiamco	8
(Chinese Taipei) Wu Kun-lin	11
(Kuwait) Bader al-Awadhi	3
(Chinese Taipei) Hsieh Chia-chen	11
(Chinese Taipei) Chang Yu-lung	10
(Germany) Thorsten Hohmann	11
(Philippines) Carlo Biado	11
(Poland) Tomasz Kapłan	8
(Philippines) Jeffrey Ignacio	11
(Philippines) Francisco Felicilda	9
(Spain) Francisco Sánchez	10
(China) Liu Haitao	11
(Poland) Radosław Babica	9
(Chinese Taipei) Ko Ping-chung	11
(Chinese Taipei) Ko Pin-yi	11
(Chinese Taipei) Nien Rong-chih	4
(Netherlands) Niels Feijen	7
(Philippines) Roland Garcia	11
(Venezuela) Jalal al-Sarisi	11
(Vietnam) Dương Quốc Hoàng	3
(Chinese Taipei) Lo Li-wen	5
(China) Dang Jinhu	11
(Philippines) Jeff De Luna	9
(Myanmar) Maung Maung	11
(Poland) Mateusz Śniegocki	7
(Germany) Joshua Filler	11
(Albania) Eklent Kaçi	11
(Spain) David Alcaide	4
(Russia) Konstantin Stepanov	9
(Canada) John Morra	11

Last 16
(Austria) Albin Ouschan	3
(Chinese Taipei) Wu Kun-lin	11
(Chinese Taipei) Hsieh Chia-chen	11
(Germany) Thorsten Hohmann	7
(Philippines) Carlo Biado	11
(Philippines) Jeffrey Ignacio	7
(China) Liu Haitao	11
(Chinese Taipei) Ko Ping-chung	10
(Chinese Taipei) Ko Pin-yi	8
(Philippines) Roland Garcia	11
(Venezuela) Jalal al-Sarisi	11
(China) Dang Jinhu	7
(Myanmar) Maung Maung	11
(Germany) Joshua Filler	6
(Albania) Eklent Kaçi	11
(Canada) John Morra	7

Quarter final
(Chinese Taipei) Wu Kun-lin	11
(Chinese Taipei) Hsieh Chia-chen	8
(Philippines) Carlo Biado	(Note: Liu Haitao arrived 25 minutes late. The game was therefore scored 11-0 for Carlo Biado.)
(China) Liu Haitao	DQ
(Philippines) Roland Garcia	11
(Venezuela) Jalal al-Sarisi	4
(Myanmar) Maung Maung	7
(Albania) Eklent Kaçi	11

Semi-Final
(Chinese Taipei) Wu Kun-lin	6
(Philippines) Carlo Biado	11
(Philippines) Roland Garcia	11
(Albania) Eklent Kaçi	6

Final
(Philippines) Carlo Biado	13
(Philippines) Roland Garcia	5

==== Final ====
The final was played between two Filipino players, the two players alternate break. Carlo Biado reached 13 in the first place to win the championship.

Biado quickly dominated the first two games. He then took advantage of Garcia's mistakes to make the score 5–0, then 7–0. Garcia gets the first point in the eighth game, losing 1–7. However Garcia's perfectionism in the next game led Biado to raise the score to 8–1.

Garcia seemed to be back with two straight wins, with a 3–8 deficit. However, a good break from Biado, with a penalty shoot-out Garcia made the score continue to separate the 7 points is 10–3. However, at this time the results seem to have been determined. Biado quickly ended the match with a perfect game of breaking balls and win the match and the 9-Ball world championship for the first time.

Player	Lag	Rack																		Racks won
Player	Lag	1	2	3	4	5	6	7	8	9	10	11	12	13	14	15	16	17	18	Racks won
(Philippines) Carlo Biado		1	1	1	1	1	1	1		1			1	1	1			1	1	13
(Philippines) Roland Garcia	•								1		1	1				1	1			5
