= 2019 Leende Open =

9-Ball pool tournament, Feb 2019

Tournament information
- Dates: 7–10 February 2019
- Venue: Golden Tulip Jagershorst
- City: Leende
- Country: Netherlands
- Organisation: Euro Tour
- Format: Single Elimination, Double elimination
- Total prize fund: €38,000
- Winner's share: €4,500
- Defending champion: USA Shane Van Boening

Final
- Champion: GER Joshua Filler
- Runner-up: RUS Ruslan Chinakhov
- Score: 9–7

The Dynamic Billard Leende Open 2019 (sometimes known as the 2019 Netherlands Open) was a nine-ball pool tournament, and the first Euro Tour event of 2019. The event was held between 7–10 February 2019, at the Golden Tulip Jagershorst hotel in Leende, Netherlands. The event was won by Germany's Joshua Filler, who defeated Ruslan Chinakhov 9–7 in the final. This was Filler's first Euro Tour win, having previously been a runner-up at three previous events.

Shane Van Boening was the defending champion, having defeated Eklent Kaçi 9–8 in the final of the 2018 Leende Open. Van Boening, however did not take part in the 2019 competition.

== Tournament format ==
The event was played as a double elimination knockout tournament, until the last 32 stage; where the tournament was contested as a single elimination bracket. Matches were all played as a race to 9 racks.

=== Prize fund ===
The tournament prize fund was similar to that of other Euro Tour events, with €4,500 awarded to the winner of the event.

	Prize money
Winner	€4,500
Finalist	€3,000
Semi finalist	€1,750
Quarter finalist	€1,250
last 16	€1,000
Last 32	€600
33–48	€275
Total	€38,000

== Tournament summary ==
The tournament began under the alternative break format on 7 February, with matches being played as a race to 9 racks. The event featured a field of 170 players playing in a double elimination tournament until the final 32 players, who then compete in a single elimination bracket. The event featured all of the top 16 Euro Tour players, with the exception of Mario He, who was serving a suspension for a drugs violation in 2018. Matches were live streamed via the Euro Tour website, with specific matches broadcast on Facebook. The event also saw guest commentary for matches by players such as Joshua Filler. The previous year's winner, Shane Van Boening did not take part in the event.

=== Double elimination rounds ===
Thorsten Hohmann played in his first Euro Tour event, since the 2012 Bosnia & Herzegovina Open; although being tied 8–8 with Michal Turkowski, Hohmann won his first round match 9–8. Hohmann would not advance to the knockout round, following a 4–9 loser's round loss to Croatia's Philipp Stojanovic.

In the first round, Imran Majid defeated WPA World number 2 Alexander Kazakis 9–6. Kazakis would reach the knockout rounds, thanks to a 9–6 victory over David Alcaide. WPA world number 10 Chris Melling would also lose his first round match, losing to local player Joey Haegmans 9–8. During the deciding rack, Haegmans was snookered, but fluked the shot, before running the remaining balls. Melling would not qualify for the knockout round, as he would lose to Greece's Dimitris Loukatos in the loser's bracket 9–8, having already been behind in his match with Christian Brehme. Euro Tour's number one ranked player Eklent Kaçi also did not reach the last 32 stage, losing to Ukraine's Vitaliy Patsura in the loser's 4th round.

=== Knockout rounds ===
With the field reduced to the final 32 players, the finals were played as a single elimination tournament, held between 9–10 February 2019. Of the highest ranked players, only Oliver Ortmann failed to progress to the last 16 stage, as he was defeated 7–9 to Greece's Damianos Giallourakis. Niels Feijen also defeated 2017 junior world champion Sanjin Pehlivanovic 9–1 in the last 32 stage.

At the last 16 stage, several matches saw two former winners of Euro Tour events face off. Ralf Souquet defeated Fedor Gorst in the first of these 9–7 to set up a match with Wiktor Zieliński. Ruslan Chinakhov would also defeat Niels Feijen 9–8 in a deciding rack. Former Euro Tour runner-up Francisco Sánchez Ruiz also defeated former winner Imran Majid on a decider.

The quarter-finals of the event saw Ralf Souquet defeat the youngest ever winner of a Euro Tour event, Wiktor Zieliński 9–6, which would be the only match not to go to a deciding rack. Ruslan Chinakhov, Joshua Filler, and Maximilian Lechner all won their quarter-final matches 9–8, defeating Francisco Sánchez Ruiz, Mark Gray and Albin Ouschan respectively.

In the semifinals, Maximilian Lechner took a 7–3 lead over Joshua Filler, before losing 5 straight racks, to go behind 7–8. Lechner would win the next rack, however Filler would win the final rack, to reach the final 9–8. In the other semifinal, the most successful Euro Tour player in history, Ralf Souquet played Russian Ruslan Chinakhov. Chinachov would take a 7–2 lead, before eventually winning 9–5.

Joshua Filler met Ruslan Chinakhov in the final, which featured guest commentary by Mark Gray and Imran Majid. The match would remain even with the difference in scores only being more than one at 6–4 to Chinachov, before being levelled at 7–7. Filler would run the rack to take an 8–7 lead; before Chinachov scratched on his break, and Filler cleared the table to win the event 9–7. Filler won his first Euro Tour title, despite being the reigning World Nine-ball Champion.

After the final, Filler stated that now he had won events at the World and Euro Tours, that his next goal was to win the U.S. Open Championship. The win moved Filler to second in the Euro Tour rankings, only behind Eklent Kaçi. Despite making the final, Chinachov would only advance to 41st in the Tour rankings.

== Results ==
=== Men's competition ===
1st Round
(France) Alex Montpellier	3
(Russia) Fedor Gorst	9
(Bulgaria) Gorgi Georgiev	6
(Germany) Ralf Souquet	9
(Poland) Wiktor Zieliński	9
(Italy) Luca Nicoletti	1
(Poland) Daniel Macioł	9
(Albania) Besar Spahiu	4
(United Kingdom) Imran Majid	9
(Poland) Hubert Łopotko	6
(Hungary) Attila Bezdan	4
(Spain) Francisco Sánchez Ruiz	9
(Russia) Ruslan Chinakhov	9
(Bulgaria) Stanimir Ruslanov	2
(Bosnia and Herzegovina) Sanjin Pehlivanović	1
(Netherlands) Niels Feijen	9
(Germany) Joshua Filler	9
(Greece) Konstantinos Koukiadakis	3
(Poland) Wojciech Szewczyk	9
(Norway) Mats Schjetne	4
(England) Mark Gray	9
(Poland) Tomasz Kapłan	7
(Greece) Damianos Giallourakis	9
(Germany) Oliver Ortmann	7
(Austria) Maximilian Lechner	9
(Germany) Tobias Bongers	6
(Poland) Marek Kudlik	9
(Netherlands) Marc Bijsterbosch	7
(Finland) Jani Uski	6
(Greece) Dimitris Loukatos	9
(Finland) Kim Laaksonen	6
(Austria) Albin Ouschan	9

2nd Round
(Russia) Fedor Gorst	7
(Germany) Ralf Souquet	9
(Poland) Wiktor Zieliński	9
(Poland) Daniel Macioł	5
(United Kingdom) Imran Majid	8
(Spain) Francisco Sánchez Ruiz	9
(Russia) Ruslan Chinakhov	9
(Netherlands) Niels Feijen	8
(Germany) Joshua Filler	9
(Poland) Wojciech Szewczyk	3
(England) Mark Gray	9
(Greece) Damianos Giallourakis	6
(Austria) Maximilian Lechner	9
(Poland) Marek Kudlik	3
(Greece) Dimitris Loukatos	1
(Austria) Albin Ouschan	9

Quarterfinals
(Germany) Ralf Souquet	9
(Poland) Wiktor Zieliński	6
(Spain) Francisco Sánchez Ruiz	8
(Russia) Ruslan Chinakhov	9
(Germany) Joshua Filler	9
(England) Mark Gray	8
(Austria) Maximilian Lechner	9
(Austria) Albin Ouschan	8

Semifinals
(Germany) Ralf Souquet	5
(Russia) Ruslan Chinakhov	9
(Germany) Joshua Filler	9
(Austria) Maximilian Lechner	8

Finals
(Russia) Ruslan Chinakhov	7
(Germany) Joshua Filler	9
