= 2018 Austria Open =

2018 Sankt Johann im Pongau Open
Tournament information
- Dates: 12–14 April 2018
- Venue: Alpina, Wellness & Sporthotel,
- City: St. Johann im Pongau
- Country: Austria
- Organisation: Euro Tour
- Format: Single Elimination
- Total prize fund: €36,000
- Winner's share: €4,500

Final
- Champion: (Greece) Alexander Kazakis
- Runner-up: (Estonia) Denis Grabe
- Score: 9–5

The Dynamic Billard Sankt Johann in the Pongau Open 2018 (sometimes known as the 2018 Austria Open) was the second Euro Tour 9-Ball pool event in 2018. The event was won by Greece's Alexander Kazakis who defeated Estonia's Denis Grabe 9–5 in the final. This was Kazkis's first Euro Tour victory.

The previous years champion Mario He was defeated in the semi-final by Grabe 9–4.

== Tournament format ==
The event saw a total of 208 players compete, in a double-elimination knockout tournament, until the last 32 stage; where the tournament was contested as single elimination.

=== Prize fund ===
The tournament prize fund was similar to that of other Euro Tour events, with €4,500 for the winner of the event.

	Prize money
Winner	4.500 €
Finalist	€3.000
Semifinalist	€1.750
quarterfinalist	€1.250
last 16	€1.000
Last 32	€500
33–48 Place	€250
Total	€36.000

== Tournament results ==
Round of 32
(Albania) Edmond Zaja	8
(Saudi Arabia) Abdullah al-Shammari	9
(Bosnia and Herzegovina) Sanjin Pehlivanović	6
(Greece) Evangelos Vettas	9
(Hungary) Olivér Szolnoki	4
(Greece) Alexander Kazakis	9
(Greece) Nick Malai	3
(Russia) Ruslan Tschinachow	9
(Germany) Joshua Filler	9
(France) Stephan Cohen	3
(Germany) Ralf Souquet	9
(Spain) David Alcaide	4
(Poland) Tomasz Kapłan	8
(Netherlands) Niels Feijen	9
(Kuwait) Abdullah al-Enezi	1
(Albania) Eklent Kaçi	9
(Poland) Marek Kudlik	8
(Poland) Wiktor Zieliński	9
(Austria) Maximilian Lechner	9
(Poland) Mateusz Śniegocki	6
(Netherlands) Marc Bijsterbosch	9
(Russia) Sergei Luzker	4
(Portugal) Henrique Correia	4
(Estonia) Denis Grabe	9
(Germany) Markus Buck	9
(Poland) Karol Skowerski	5
(Czech Republic) Roman Hybler	9
(Netherlands) Ivar Saris	4
(Poland) Wojciech Szewczyk	9
(Russia) Fedor Gorst	5
(Poland) Radosław Babica	6
(Austria) Mario He	9

Round of 16
(Saudi Arabia) Abdullah al-Shammari	9
(Greece) Evangelos Vettas	8
(Greece) Alexander Kazakis	9
(Russia) Ruslan Tschinachow	1
(Germany) Joshua Filler	9
(Germany) Ralf Souquet	7
(Netherlands) Niels Feijen	8
(Albania) Eklent Kaçi	9
(Poland) Wiktor Zieliński	9
(Austria) Maximilian Lechner	3
(Netherlands) Marc Bijsterbosch	8
(Estonia) Denis Grabe	9
(Germany) Markus Buck	8
(Czech Republic) Roman Hybler	9
(Poland) Wojciech Szewczyk	7
(Austria) Mario He	9

Quarterfinal
(Saudi Arabia) Abdullah al-Shammari	2
(Greece) Alexander Kazakis	9
(Germany) Joshua Filler	7
(Albania) Eklent Kaçi	9
(Poland) Wiktor Zieliński	4
(Estonia) Denis Grabe	9
(Czech Republic) Roman Hybler	6
(Austria) Mario He	9

Semifinal
(Greece) Alexander Kazakis	9
(Albania) Eklent Kaçi	5
(Estonia) Denis Grabe	9
(Austria) Mario He	4

Final
(Greece) Alexander Kazakis	9
(Estonia) Denis Grabe	5
