= 2018 Leende Open =

Tabletop billiards sporting event

Dynamic Billiard Treviso Open

Tournament information
- Dates: 20–23 September 2018
- Venue: BHR Treviso Hotel,
- City: Leende
- Country: Netherlands
- Organisation: Euro Tour
- Format: Single Elimination, Double Elimination
- Total prize fund: €36,000
- Winner's share: €4,500

Final
- Champion: (United States) Shane Van Boening
- Runner-up: (Albania) Eklent Kaçi
- Score: 9-8

The 2018 Dynamic Billiard Leende Open, was the fourth Euro Tour 9-Ball pool event in 2018. The event was won by America's Shane Van Boening who defeated Albania's Eklent Kaçi 9–8 in the final. Unlike other Euro Tour events, the field was open to other nations outside of Europe. Van Boening became the only American after Johnny Archer in 2000 to win a Euro Tour event. In making the final, Eklent had been in the semi-final or better of the last 5 Euro Tour events.

Ruslan Tschinachow was the defending champion, but did not reach the knockout stages of the event. A women's event held in Braga at the same time as the event was held in Braga, Portugal. The event was won by Kristina Tkach defeating Marharyta Fefilava in the final 7–0.

== Tournament format ==
The event saw a total of 159 players compete, in a double-elimination knockout tournament, until the last 32 stage; where the tournament was contested as single elimination.

=== Prize fund ===
The tournament prize fund was similar to that of other Euro Tour events, with €4,500 for the winner of the event.

	Prize money
Winner	4.500 €
Finalist	€3.000
Semifinalist	€1.750
quarterfinalist	€1.250
last 16	€1.000
Last 32	€500
33–48 Place	€250
Total	€36.000

== Tournament results ==
1st Round
(Austria) Mario He	6
(United States) Shane Van Boening	9
(United States) Billy Thorpe	9
(United States) Mitchell Ellerman	4
(Russia) Fedor Gorst	1
(United States) Corey Deuel	9
(United Kingdom) Mark Gray	7
(Austria) Maximilian Lechner	9
(Poland) Marek Kudlik	3
(Germany) Ralf Souquet	9
(Lithuania) Pijus Labutis	9
(Poland) Mateusz Śniegocki	6
(United States) Skyler Woodward	9
(Greece) Damianos Giallourakis	5
(Poland) Wojciech Szewczyk	7
(Russia) Maxim Dudanez	9
(Austria) Albin Ouschan	9
(Slovakia) Jakub Koniar	7
(Croatia) Philipp Stojanović	9
(Poland) Tomasz Kapłan	4
(Russia) Sergei Luzker	6
(Finland) Kim Laaksonen	9
(Greece) Nick Malai	9
(United States) Shane McMinn	3
(Finland) Petri Makkonen	9
(Poland) Radosław Babica	6
(Hungary) Olivér Szolnoki	7
(Poland) Wojciech Sroczyński	9
(Germany) Oliver Ortmann	9
(Saudi Arabia) Saad-Ali Aldrees	7
(Netherlands) Niels Feijen	5
(Albania) Eklent Kaçi	9

2nd Round
(United States) Shane Van Boening	9
(United States) Billy Thorpe	3
(United States) Corey Deuel	9
(Austria) Maximilian Lechner	5
(Germany) Ralf Souquet	7
(Lithuania) Pijus Labutis	9
(United States) Skyler Woodward	9
(Russia) Maxim Dudanez	7
(Austria) Albin Ouschan	9
(Croatia) Philipp Stojanović	4
(Finland) Kim Laaksonen	9
(Greece) Nick Malai	6
(Finland) Petri Makkonen	9
(Poland) Wojciech Sroczyński	3
(Germany) Oliver Ortmann	5
(Albania) Eklent Kaçi	9

Quarterfinals
(United States) Shane Van Boening	9
(United States) Corey Deuel	7
(Lithuania) Pijus Labutis	9
(United States) Skyler Woodward	8
(Austria) Albin Ouschan	9
(Finland) Kim Laaksonen	4
(Finland) Petri Makkonen	6
(Albania) Eklent Kaçi	9

Semifinals
(United States) Shane Van Boening	9
(Lithuania) Pijus Labutis	8
(Austria) Albin Ouschan	5
(Albania) Eklent Kaçi	9

Finals
(United States) Shane Van Boening	9
(Albania) Eklent Kaçi	8
