= 2017 Treviso Open =

Dynamic Billiard Treviso Open

Tournament information
- Dates: 16–18 November 2017
- Venue: BHR Treviso Hotel
- City: Treviso
- Country: Italy
- Organisation: Euro Tour
- Format: Single Elimination
- Total prize fund: €36,000
- Winner's share: €4,500

Final
- Champion: (Poland) Wiktor Zieliński
- Runner-up: (Austria) Mario He
- Score: 9-1

The 2017 Dynamic Treviso Open was the fifth and final Euro Tour 9-Ball pool event in 2017. The event was won by Poland's Wiktor Zieliński who defeated Austria's Mario He 9–1 in the final. This was Zielinski's first Euro Tour victory, as he became the youngest player to win a Euro Tour event, aged 16.

2016 Treviso Open champion David Alcaide lost in the last 32 of the event against Maximilian Lechner.

== Tournament format ==
The event saw a total of 142 players compete, in a double-elimination knockout tournament, until the last 32 stage; where the tournament was contested as single elimination.

=== Prize fund ===
	Prize money
Winner	4.500 €
Finalist	€3.000
Semifinalist	€1.750
quarterfinalist	€1.250
last 16	€1.000
Last 32	€500
33–48 Place	€250
Total	€36.000

== Tournament results ==
1st Round
(Spain) David Alcaide	6
(Austria) Maximilian Lechner	9
(Austria) Albin Ouschan	9
(Austria) Stefan Huber	4
(England) Mark Gray	9
(Netherlands) Ivo Aarts	1
(Germany) Valery Kuloyants	6
(Estonia) Denis Grabe	9
(Poland) Piotr Kudlik	5
(England) Daryl Peach	9
(Hungary) Olivér Szolnoki	5
(Poland) Marek Kudlik	9
(Saudi Arabia) Abdulrahman al-Amar	1
(Poland) Wiktor Zieliński	9
(Finland) Kim Laaksonen	3
(Italy) Daniele Corrieri	9
(Netherlands) Niels Feijen	9
(Poland) Mieszko Fortuński	3
(Poland) Wojciech Sroczyński	9
(Czech Republic) Roman Hybler	7
(Russia) Maxim Dudanez	5
(Austria) Mario He	9
(Netherlands) Marc Bijsterbosch	4
(Spain) Francisco Sánchez	9
(Greece) Nick Malai	4
(Serbia) Aleksa Pecelj	9
(Netherlands) Ivar Saris	4
(Russia) Fedor Gorst	9
(Finland) Petri Makkonen	2
(Albania) Eklent Kaçi	9
(Poland) Wojciech Szewczyk	7
(Croatia) Philipp Stojanovic	9

2nd Round
(Austria) Maximilian Lechner	2
(Austria) Albin Ouschan	9
(England) Mark Gray	8
(Estonia) Denis Grabe	9
(England) Daryl Peach	9
(Poland) Marek Kudlik	8
(Poland) Wiktor Zieliński	9
(Italy) Daniele Corrieri	6
(Netherlands) Niels Feijen	9
(Poland) Wojciech Sroczyński	5
(Austria) Mario He	9
(Spain) Francisco Sánchez	5
(Serbia) Aleksa Pecelj	9
(Russia) Fedor Gorst	3
(Albania) Eklent Kaçi	9
(Croatia) Philipp Stojanovic	2

Quarterfinals
(Austria) Albin Ouschan	8
(Estonia) Denis Grabe	9
(England) Daryl Peach	5
(Poland) Wiktor Zieliński	9
(Netherlands) Niels Feijen	5
(Austria) Mario He	9
(Serbia) Aleksa Pecelj	4
(Albania) Eklent Kaçi	9

Semifinals
(Estonia) Denis Grabe	2
(Poland) Wiktor Zieliński	9
(Austria) Mario He	9
(Albania) Eklent Kaçi	7

Finals
(Poland) Wiktor Zieliński	9
(Austria) Mario He	1
