= Sara Rocha =

Portuguese pool player, born 1981

Personal information
- Website: www.sararocha.com

Pool career
- Country: Portugal
- Turned pro: 1999

Sara Rocha is a Portuguese professional pool player. Rocha is a two time European Pool Championship team event winner, having won in both 2018 and 2019 with partner Vania Franco. Rocha is a two-time semi-finalist of events on the Euro Tour, having reached this stage at both the 2018 Veldhoven Open, and the 2019 Austria Open.
