= Veronika Hubrtová =

Czech pool player

Personal information
- Born: 19 April 1984 (age 42) Prague, Czechoslovakia

Pool career
- Country: Czech Republic
- Pool games: 9-Ball

Tournament wins
- Major: 2002 European Pool Championship (9-ball)

Veronika Hubrtová (born 19 April 1984) is a Czech professional pool player.

== Biography ==
Hubrtová was born on 19 April 1984.

== Career ==
Hubrtová is most notable for reaching the last 32 stage of the 2009 WPA World Ten-ball Championship. Hubrtová is also a regular on the Euro Tour, having reached two semi-finals in 2019, at both the 2019 Austria Open and 2019 Veldhoven Open.

Hubrtová is a former European champion, winning the Nine-ball event in 2002, as well as reaching four finals.
