= Diana Khodjaeva =

Belgian pool player, born 1998

Personal information
- Born: 26 August 1998 (age 27)

Pool career
- Country: Belgium

Diana Khodjaeva (born 26 August 1998) is a Belgian professional pool player. Khodjaeva represented Europe at the Atlantic Challenge Cup in 2017 against the United States team.

She is the younger sister of Kamila Khodjaeva who is also a professional pool player

== Career ==
Khodjaeva represented Europe at the 2017 Atlantic Challenge Cup, before retiring from pool until 2019, where she entered the 2019 Austria Open, winning six games and reaching the quarter-finals, before losing 7–3 to Veronika Hubrtova.
