= Monika Margeta =

Swedish pool player (born 1975)

Personal information
- Born: 24 April 1975 (age 51)

Pool career
- Country: Sweden
- Highest rank: 15

Monika Margeta (born 24 April 1975) is a Swedish professional pool player. A mainstay of the Women's Euro Tour, she reached the final of an event in 2014. Margeta is a member of the Swedish national pool team.
