= Melanie Suessenguth =

German pool player, born May 1984

Personal information
- Born: 17 May 1984 (age 42)

Pool career
- Country: Germany
- Pool games: 9-Ball

Melanie Suessenguth (born 17 May 1984) is a German professional pool player. She is best known for being runner-up in three Euro Tour events: the 2013 Luxembourg Open, the 2015 Braga Open, and the 2019 Veldhoven Open. Suessenguth reached a career-high ranking of third in the Euro Tour in 2021.
