= 2018 Treviso Open =

Tournament information
- Dates: 15–17 November 2018
- Venue: Best Western Premier BHR Treviso Hotel
- City: Treviso
- Country: Italy
- Organisation: Euro Tour
- Format: Single Elimination, Double elimination
- Total prize fund: €36,000
- Winner's share: €4,500

Final
- Champion: (Russia) Fedor Gorst
- Runner-up: (Poland) Mateusz Śniegocki
- Score: 9–7

The Dynamic Billard Treviso Open 2018 (sometimes known as the 2018 Italy Open) was the sixth and final Euro Tour 9-Ball pool event in 2018. The event was won by Russia's Fedor Gorst who defeated Poland's Mateusz Śniegocki 9–7 in the final. This was Gorst's first Euro Tour victory.

Wiktor Zieliński was the defending champion, after having won the 2017 Treviso Open, but lost matches to Andreas Madsen and Tobias Bongers in the double elimination round.

== Tournament format ==
The event saw a total of 193 players compete, in a double-elimination knockout tournament, until the last 32 stage; where the tournament was contested as single elimination.

=== Prize fund ===
The tournament prize fund was similar to that of other Euro Tour events, with €4,500 for the winner of the event.

	Prize money
Winner	4.500 €
Finalist	3.000 €
Semifinalist	1.750 €
quarterfinalist	1.250 €
last 16	1.000 €
Last 32	500 €
33–48 Place	250 €
Total	36.000 €
