= Maximilian Lechner =

Austrian pool player

Personal information
- Nickname: Mad Max
- Born: 27 May 1990 (age 36)

Pool career
- Country: Austria
- Pool games: 9-ball
- Best finish: Quarter finals 2022 WPA World Nine-ball Championship
- Current rank: 33

Maximilian Lechner (born 27 May 1990) is an Austrian professional pool player.

Lechner has been successful on the Euro Tour, where he has reached the last 16 at the 2017 Dutch Open, 2017 Treviso Open, 2018 Leende Open, 2018 Sankt Johann im Pongau Open, as well as reaching the quarter-finals of the 2017 Klagenfurt Open before reaching semifinals at both and 2018 Treviso Open and 2019 Leende Open.

== Titles & achievements ==
- 2016 Austrian Pool Championship Nine-ball
- 2011 Austrian Pool Championship Nine-ball
- 2010 Austrian Pool Championship Nine-ball
- 2010 Austrian Pool Championship Ten-ball
- 2009 Austrian Pool Championship Straight Pool
- 2009 Austrian Pool Championship Eight-ball
- 2008 Austrian Pool Championship Straight Pool
- 2008 Austrian Pool Championship Eight-ball
