= Vania Franco =

Portuguese pool player (born 1978)

Vania Franco (born on 11 May 1978) is a Portuguese professional pool player. A two-time winner of the European Pool Championships in the team event, Franco also reached the final of an event on the Women's Euro Tour in 2014.
