= Wiktor Zieliński =

Polish pool player (born 2001)

Personal information
- Nickname: "The WiZ"
- Born: 11 January 2001 (age 25) Poznań, Poland

Pool career
- Country: Poland
- Pool games: Nine-ball, ten-ball

Tournament wins
- Minor: 2017 Treviso Open
- Current rank: 25

Wiktor Zieliński (born 11 January 2001) is a Polish professional pool player. He is the youngest player to ever win a Euro Tour event, winning the 2017 Treviso Open at the age of 16.

== Career ==
Zielinski began playing pool at aged 8 in 2009, and in 2013 entered his first competition, the Junior European championships. Zielinski played his first men's event in 2015, at the 2015 Italian Open. The following season, he won his first European championship. He won both the 9-ball and straight pool events at the European Youth Championships(under 16s). He defeated Fedor Gorst in the straight ball final 75–66, and Keskutis Zadeikis 7–5 in the 9-ball final. He won the junior straight pool championship again in 2017, whilst also finishing runner-up at the 9-ball and 8-ball events as well.

In 2017, aged 16, he became the youngest player to win an event on the Euro Tour, when he won the 2017 Treviso Open. Zielinski won the final over Mario He 9–1. The same season, he reached the quarter-finals of the 2017 Portugal Open, and the last 16 at the 2017 Klagenfurt Open. He finished tenth on the rankings list at the end of the 2017 Euro Tour season. He later reached 4th in the Euro Tour rankings, in the 2018 season.

At the 2017 WPA World Nine-ball Championship, Zielinski lost his initial match to Cheng Yu-hsuan before winning his final match of the double elimination round against Mario He 9–8, to reach the knockout round. In the knockout round, Zielinski was defeated by David Alcaide 11–5. The following year at the 2018 event, Zielinski also lost his first match, before reaching the knockout round. In the knockout rounds, he defeated Tomasz Kapłan 11–4 and Johann Chua 11–5. Zielinski set up a last 16 match again Albin Ouschan, which he eventually lost 8–11.

== Titles & achievements ==
- 2026 Super Billiards Expo Players Championship
- 2026 Poison Mixed Doubles Open
- 2024 McDermott Classic Nine-ball
- 2024 CSI U.S. Open Eight-ball Championship
- 2023 Ljubljana Mezz Open 9-Ball
- 2023 Predator Alfa Las Vegas Open 10-Ball
- 2023 Predator Michigan Open 10-Ball
- 2022 Predator Alfa Las Vegas Open 10-Ball
- 2022 Kamui Invitational Tournament
- 2022 Euro Tour Lasko Open
- 2022 Polish Pool Championship Nine-Ball
- 2021 Euro Tour Treviso Open
- 2017 Euro Tour Treviso Open
