= Eklent Kaçi =

Albanian pool and snooker player (born 1999)

Personal information
- Nickname: "The Golden Eagle"
- Born: 29 January 1999 (age 27) Laç, Albania

Pool career
- Country: Albania

Tournament wins
- World Champion: Ten-ball (2021, 2023)
- Current rank: 35
- Highest rank: 1

Eklent Kaçi (born January 29, 1999), also known as Klenti Kaçi, is an Albanian professional pool player. Kaçi won the WPA World Ten-ball Championship in 2021 and 2023 and reached the semi-finals of the 2017 WPA World Nine-ball Championship and final of the 2024 WPA World Nine-ball Championship. He has been the top-ranked player in the world of 9-ball pool.

== Career ==
Kaçi started playing pool at the age of eight. He has won the Albanian Snooker championships in addition to national pool championships, even though he never played snooker prior to his Federation asking him to join the event. Kaçi made his first European championship in 2013, for ten-ball, qualifying for the main knockout, and being eliminated in the round of 64. In 2017, Kaçi made the semi-finals of the 2017 WPA World Nine-ball Championship, losing 11–6 to Roland Garcia.

The following year, at 18 years of age, Kaçi won the Aramith Masters, and became world number one later that year. At the 2018 WPA World Nine-ball Championship, Kaçi (as world number 1), lost to 17-year-old Robbie Capito 11–10 in the last 32. Kaçi won two events on the Euro Tour, reaching Euro Tour number one in 2018. He won the 2018 Treviso Open, and the following season the 2019 Austria Open.

In June 2024 Kaçi reached the final of the WPA World Nine-ball Championship in Jeddah, Saudi Arabia, but was defeated by Fedor Gorst. In October 2024 Kaçi was part of the European team that were defeated by Asia in the inaugural Reyes Cup held in the Philippines.

== Career titles ==
- 2026 Concorde Northern Cyprus Open Nine-ball
- 2025 McDermott Open Nine-ball
- 2024 Mosconi Cup
- 2023 WPA World Ten-ball Championship
- 2023 U.K. Open Nine-ball Championship
- 2021 WPA World Ten-ball Championship
- 2021 Mosconi Cup
- 2021 Predator Austria Open Ten-ball
- 2021 Albanian Amateur Snooker Championship
- 2020 Mosconi Cup
- 2020 Stella Artois Open International Nine-ball
- 2019 European Pool Championship Eight-Ball
- 2019 Euro Tour Austria Open
- 2019 American Straight Pool Championship
- 2018 Albanian Amateur Snooker Championship
- 2018 Euro Tour Treviso Open
- 2017 World Pool Series Aramith Masters
- 2017 Predator Grand Finale
- 2016 Albanian Amateur Snooker Championship
