= Damianos Giallourakis =

Greek pool player, born October 1986

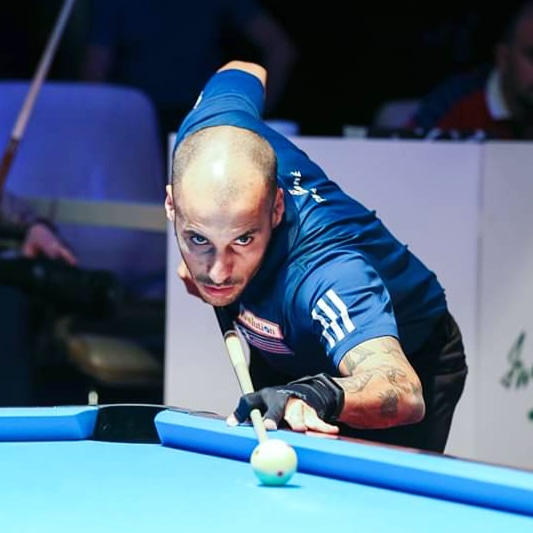
- Giallourakis at the Bucharest Open

Personal information
- Nickname: Jump Master
- Born: 15 October 1986 (age 39) Rhodes, Greece
- Website: facebook.com/jumpmasterd

Pool career
- Country: Greece and Norway
- Pool games: 8-ball, 9-ball, 10-ball
Medal record
Bronze in Eurotour

Damianos Giallourakis (born 15 October 1986) is a Greek professional pool player from the island of Rhodes and lives in Oslo. He is best known as the 'Jump Master' of the pool world. He is a regular player on the Euro Tour, winning his first medal at the 2019 Austria Open, reaching the semi-final before losing 9–6 to Joshua Filler.

== Titles & Achievements ==
- 2019 Euro Tour Austria Open
