= Denis Grabe =

Estonian pool player, born 1990

Personal information
- Nickname: "Mr. Grapefruit"
- Born: 22 February 1990 (age 36) Tallinn, then part of Estonian SSR, Soviet Union

Pool career
- Country: Estonia

Tournament wins
- Current rank: 2 WPA
- Highest rank: 11

Denis Grabe (born February 22, 1990, in Tallinn, Estonia), is an Estonian professional pool player. Grabe won the Las Vegas open in 2025 beating Joshua Filler in the finals. Sets 2-2 and in shootout 4–3, winning his biggest tournament of his career. Grabe won Maldives Open in 2024 beating Alexandros Kazakis 10–9.

Grabe reached the semifinal of 2024 WPA World Ten-ball Championship losing to Naoyuki Ōi of Japan 2–3 in sets, he beat Aloysious Yapp in the last 16 and Francisco Sánchez Ruiz in the last 8 to achieve a bronze medal. Grabe reached the quarter-final of the 2016 WPA World Nine-ball Championship, before losing to Cheng Yu-hsuan 11–3. Grabe won two consecutive Euro Tour tournaments in a row in 2014, at the Austria Open, and Slovenian Open. In 2018, he also reached the final of the 2018 Sankt Johann im Pongau Open, losing the final 9–5 to Alexander Kazakis.

== Titles & Achievements ==
- 2026 Arizona Open Nine-ball Championship
- 2025 Las Vegas Open 10-ball Champion
- 2024 Maldives Open Ten-ball Championship winner
- 2024 Bronze medallist World Championships in Vegas 10-ball
- 2019 Euro Tour Antalya Open
- 2018 World Pool Series 9-Ball Championship New York
- 2014 Euro Tour Austria Open
- 2014 Euro Tour Slovenian Open
