= Imran Majid =

English professional pool player

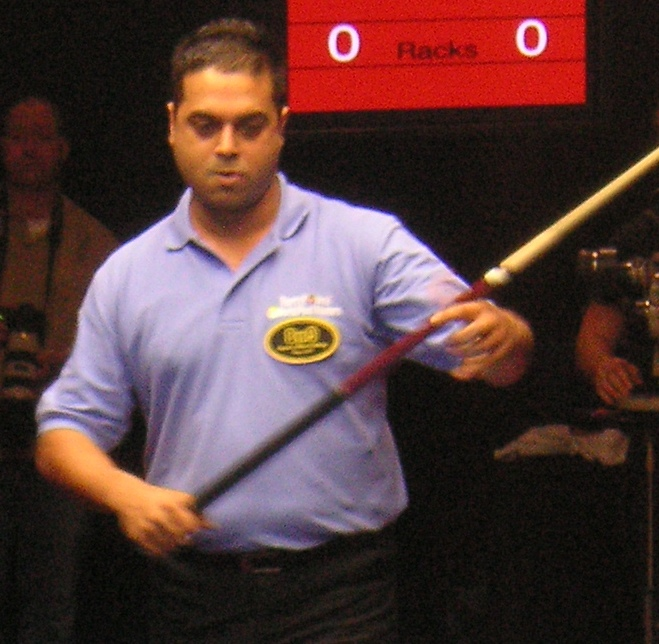
Imran Majid at the World Pool Trickshot Masters 2007

Imran Majid (Urdu: امران مجید) (born 4 October 1972 in London) is an English professional pool player.

== Early life and career ==
Majid was born in London to parents who emigrated from Lahore, Punjab.

Majid, whose nickname is "The Maharaja", was winner of the 2007 Weert Open and the Italian Euro Tour event in 2006.

He made his Mosconi Cup debut in the 2006 edition in Rotterdam. He and the other rookie of the tournament, David Alcaide, upset the American top duo Earl Strickland and Johnny Archer 7–2 in their doubles confrontation.

Majid practiced much of his early days at Riley's Snooker Club, Hounslow.

== Titles ==
- 2010 WPA World Team Championship
- 2007 Euro Tour Netherlands Open
- 2006 Euro Tour Italy Open
