= Ruslan Chinakhov =

Russian pool player (born 1992)

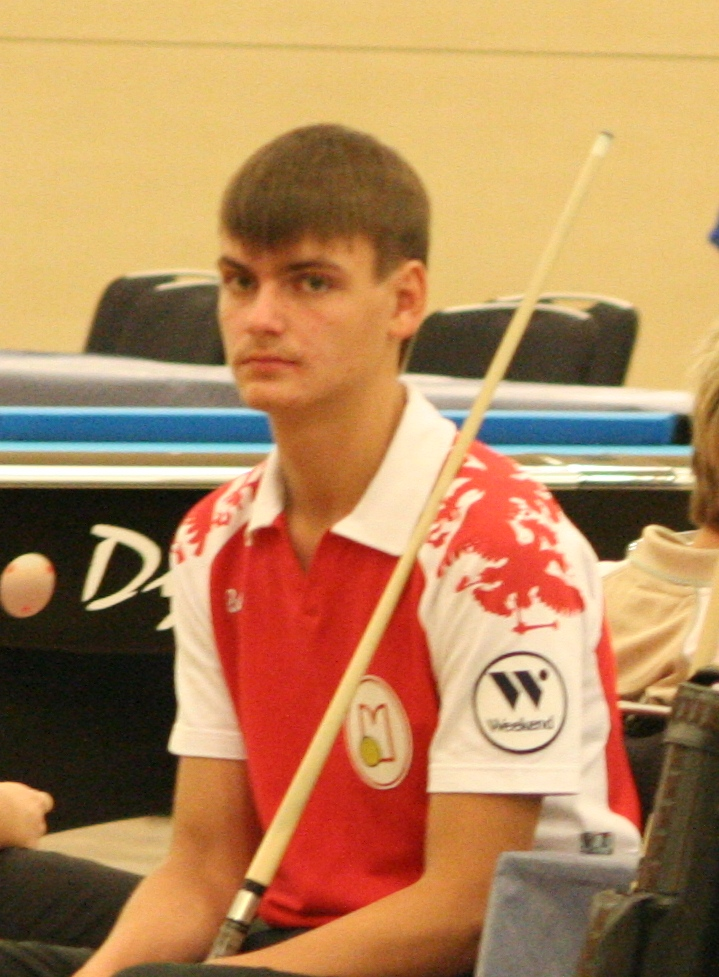

Personal information
- Nicknames: "The Kid", "The Siberian Express"
- Born: 25 January 1992 (age 34) Moscow, Russia

Pool career
- Country: Russia
- Pool games: Nine-ball

Tournament wins
- Minor: 2017 Dutch Open

Ruslan Yuryevich Chinakhov (Russian: Руслан Юрьевич Чинахов; born 25 January 1992) is a Russian professional primarily nine-ball pool player. Ruslan was the world nine-ball Juniors champion in 2009. Chinakhov has won several events, including the Euro Tour Dutch Open 2017, defeating Christoph Reintjes in the final.

== Career ==
Ruslan entered his first tournament in 2005, at the age of 13, at the Russian pool championships. The following year, he won the 2006 Kremlin Cup 9-Ball event. Chinakhov reached his first semi-finals of a Euro Tour event the following year in 2007, doing so at the Netherlands Open 2007, losing to Imran Majid 10–7.

Chinakhov's career took off in 2009, at the age of 17, he won his first world championship, winning the junior 2009 WPA World Nine-ball Championship, winning 11–7 in the final. The following year, Chinakhov made the semi-finals of the 2010 WPA World Eight-ball Championship defeating number one seed Mika Immonen, Yukio Akakariyama and Jeff De Luna before a loss to Karl Boyes.

Chinakhov's most successful season came in 2017, when he won the European Pool Championships, and his first Euro Tour event at the 2017 Dutch Open.

In 2019, Chinakhov would reach the final of the 2019 Leende Open, and play Joshua Filler. Despite having a two rack advantage at 6–4, Chinakhov would later lose 9–7.

== Personal life ==
Chinakhov has also competed at snooker at various levels, and was a wildcard player at the World Series of Snooker in Moscow. Despite losing in the first round to world champion Mark Selby, he won a frame, losing 4–1.

== Titles & achievements ==
- 2021 Russian Pool Championship 9-Ball
- 2019 American Straight Pool Championship
- 2019 Russian Pool Championship 8-Ball
- 2017 World Pool Series Molinari Players Championship
- 2017 Euro Tour Dutch Open
- 2017 European Pool Championship 9-Ball
- 2016 Russian Pool Championship 9-Ball
- 2016 Russian Pool Championship 8-Ball
- 2015 Kremlin Cup
- 2015 Derby City Classic 14.1 Challenge
- 2014 Russian Pool Championship 9-Ball
- 2014 Kremlin Cup
- 2013 Russian Pool Championship 8-Ball
- 2012 Russian Pool Championship 8-Ball
- 2012 Russian Pool Championship 10-Ball
- 2012 Russian Pool Championship 14.1
- 2011 Russian Pool Championship 10-Ball
- 2010 Russian Pool Championship 14.1
- 2010 Russian Pool Championship 9-Ball
- 2009 WPA World Nine-ball Junior championship
- 2009 Russian Pool Championship 9-Ball
- 2008 Russian Pool Championship 8-Ball
