= Alexander Kazakis =

Professional 9-Ball pool player

Personal information
- Nickname: "Kazabooboo"
- Born: 16 July 1991 (age 34)

Pool career
- Country: Greece
- Pool games: 9-ball, 10-ball
- Best finish: Semi finals 2022 WPA World Nine-ball Championship
- Current rank: 4
- Highest rank: 1

Alexander Kazakis (Note: Sometimes known as Alexandros Kazakis) (Born July 16, 1991) is a Greek professional pool player. Kazakis is a former European 10-ball champion, and regular 9-ball player. In 2018, he was the number one ranked player by the World Pool-Billiard Association.

== Career ==
In 2016, Kazakis won the Kremlin Cup, without losing a game. Kazakis reached the semi-final of the 2018 WPA World Nine-ball Championship; before losing to eventual winner Joshua Filler on a final frame decider.

Kazakis won the 2018 Austria Open event on the Euro Tour, defeating Denis Grabe in the final 9–6.

Kazakis finished in second place of the 2019 World Pool Masters Tournament, losing to David Alcaide in the final 9–8 having led 5-0 and 8–5.

Kazakis won the 2021 World Pool Masters, beating Shane Van Boening in the final 9–0. This is the first occasion a player has made a "clean sweep" of the final.

== Titles & Achievements ==
- 2025 Predator Las Vegas Mixed Doubles - (with Kelly Fisher)
- 2022 Predator Wisconsin Open 10-Ball
- 2021 World Pool Masters
- 2018 Euro Tour Pongau Open
- 2016 Kremlin Cup
- 2015 European Pool Championship 10-Ball
