= 2018 WPA World Nine-ball Championship =

Pool tournament

WPA World 9-Ball Championship 2018
Tournament information
- Sport: 9-ball
- Location: al-Arabi Sports Club, Doha, Qatar
- Dates: December 14, 2018–December 20, 2018
- Tournament format: Double elimination / Single elimination
- Host: WPA World Nine-ball Championship
- Participants: 128

Final positions
- Champion: (Germany) Joshua Filler
- Runner-up: (Philippines) Carlo Biado

The 2018 WPA World Nine-ball Championship was a Nine-ball pool tournament. The event took place between December 10 to 20, 2018 in the al-Attiya Sports Arena of the Al-Arabi Sports Club in Doha, Qatar. The Qatari capital held the WPA World Nine-ball Championship for the eighth time in a row.

The reigning champion was Filipino Carlo Biado, who defeated his compatriot Roland Garcia 13–5 in the 2017 final. Biado would reach the final of the event, defeating Shane Van Boening in the semi-final. Germany's Joshua Filler won the event, defeating Biado in the final 13–10.

== Tournament summary ==
The event was entered by 128 participants who were initially divided into 16 groups of 8 players, in which they competed against each other from December 14 to 16 in a double elimination tournament. Four players in each group qualified for the final round, which will be played from December 17 to 20. The event was played under "alternating break" format.

In the initial double-elimination round, 2003 and 2013 champion Thorsten Hohmann was eliminated, having first lost 6–9 to Jason Theron, and then to 2005 champion Wu Jia-qing also 6–9, despite being ahead 6–2.

Later in the event, 9-ball world number one Eklent Kaçi was defeated in the round of 32 – 10–11 to 17 year old Robbie Capito. Capito was at one stage 7–1, and 10–8 down in the match, but won the final three racks to win the match.

The semi-finals and final were played on the December 20, 2018. The reigning champion Carlo Biado defeated Shane Van Boening in the first semi-final, whilst Joshua Filler defeated Alexander Kazakis in a final rack decider. Filler would win the event; climbing to an 11–7 lead, and eventually winning 13–10.

=== Prize money ===
The event saw a total prize pool of $200,000.

	Prize money
Winner	40.000 US$
Final	15.000 US$
Semi-final	? US$
Quarter-final	? US$
Last 16	? US$
Last 32	? US$
Last 64	? US$
Total	200.000 US$

== Preliminary round ==
=== Group 1 ===
Main Round
(Albania) Eklent Kaçi	9
(Chile) Alejandro Carvajal	7
(Kuwait) Meshaal al-Murdhi	9
(Qatar) Abdulatif Alfawal	5
(Singapore) Aloysius Yapp	9
(Maldives) Fayaz Hussain	3
(Ukraine) Witalij Pazura	9
(South Korea) Ryu Seung-woo	5
1st playoff round
(Chile) Alejandro Carvajal	4
(Qatar) Abdulatif Alfawal	9
(Maldives) Fayaz Hussain	3
(South Korea) Ryu Seung-woo	9

Winner’s Round
(Albania) Eklent Kaçi	9
(Kuwait) Meshaal al-Murdhi	6
(Singapore) Aloysius Yapp	9
(Ukraine) Witalij Pazura	8
2nd playoff round
(Qatar) Abdulatif Alfawal	6
(Ukraine) Witalij Pazura	9
(South Korea) Ryu Seung-woo	9
(Kuwait) Meshaal al-Murdhi	3

=== Group 2 ===
Main Round
(Germany) Joshua Filler	9
(Bulgaria) Stanimir Ruslanow	5
(Lebanon) Mazen Berjaoui	9
(New Zealand) Matthew Edwards	6
(United States) Hunter Lombardo	5
(Poland) Radosław Babica	9
(Turkey) Sami Koylu	7
(Philippines) Jeff de Luna	9
1st playoff round
(Bulgaria) Stanimir Ruslanow	5
(New Zealand) Matthew Edwards	9
(United States) Hunter Lombardo	9
(Turkey) Sami Koylu	7

Winner’s Round
(Germany) Joshua Filler	9
(Lebanon) Mazen Berjaoui	5
(Poland) Radosław Babica	6
(Philippines) Jeff de Luna	9
2nd playoff round
(New Zealand) Matthew Edwards	7
(Poland) Radosław Babica	9
(United States) Hunter Lombardo	8
(Lebanon) Mazen Berjaoui	9

=== Group 3 ===
Main Round
(Philippines) Roland Garcia	8
(Chinese Taipei) Hsu Jui-an	9
(Bangladesh) Ahmed Nizam Uddin	1
(Kuwait) Bader al-Awadhi	9
(United States) Billy Thorpe	9
(Jordan) Ahmed Aleqaly	4
(Chinese Taipei) Liu Ri-teng	9
(Spain) David Alcaide	1
1st playoff round
(Philippines) Roland Garcia	9
(Bangladesh) Ahmed Nizam Uddin	5
(Jordan) Ahmed Aleqaly	2
(Spain) David Alcaide	9

Winner’s Round
(Chinese Taipei) Hsu Jui-an	9
(Kuwait) Bader al-Awadhi	1
(United States) Billy Thorpe	7
(Chinese Taipei) Liu Ri-teng	9
2nd playoff round
(Philippines) Roland Garcia	9
(United States) Billy Thorpe	5
(Spain) David Alcaide	7
(Kuwait) Bader al-Awadhi	9

=== Group 4 ===
Main Round
(Russia) Fedor Gorst	9
(Kuwait) Omar Al-Shaheen	6
(Syria) Mohammad Soufi	7
(South Korea) Jeong Young-hwa	9
(Poland) Wojciech Szewczyk	5
(Hong Kong) Robbie Capito	9
(Bosnia and Herzegovina) Sanjin Pehlivanović	9
(Philippines) Johann Chua	7
1st playoff round
(Kuwait) Omar Al-Shaheen	9
(Syria) Mohammad Soufi	6
(Poland) Wojciech Szewczyk	3
(Philippines) Johann Chua	9

Winner’s Round
(Russia) Fedor Gorst	9
(South Korea) Jeong Young-hwa	1
(Hong Kong) Robbie Capito	9
(Bosnia and Herzegovina) Sanjin Pehlivanović	5
2nd playoff round
(Kuwait) Omar Al-Shaheen	9
(Bosnia and Herzegovina) Sanjin Pehlivanović	6
(Philippines) Johann Chua	9
(South Korea) Jeong Young-hwa	7

=== Group 5 ===
Main Round
(Netherlands) Niels Feijen	9
(Chinese Taipei) Chang Yu-lung	5
(Spain) Francisco Díaz-Pizarro	9
(Philippines) Israel Rota	2
(United States) Corey Deuel	9
(Bangladesh) Ahmed Tanvir	5
(Kuwait) Fawaz al-Rashedi	3
(Finland) Petri Makkonen	9
1st playoff round
(Chinese Taipei) Chang Yu-lung	9
(Philippines) Israel Rota	5
(Bangladesh) Ahmed Tanvir	9
(Kuwait) Fawaz al-Rashedi	4

Winner’s Round
(Netherlands) Niels Feijen	9
(Spain) Francisco Díaz-Pizarro	7
(United States) Corey Deuel	9
(Finland) Petri Makkonen	4
2nd playoff round
(Chinese Taipei) Chang Yu-lung	6
(Finland) Petri Makkonen	9
(Bangladesh) Ahmed Tanvir	5
(Spain) Francisco Díaz-Pizarro	9

=== Group 6 ===
Main Round
(Chinese Taipei) Hsieh Chia-chen	9
(Japan) Satoshi Kawabata	3
(Russia) Ruslan Chinakhov	9
(Finland) Mika Immonen	5
(Poland) Mateusz Śniegocki	9
(South Africa) Vincent Halliday	7
(Kuwait) Abdullah Alenzi	6
(Philippines) Jeffrey Ignacio	9
1st playoff round
(Japan) Satoshi Kawabata	9
(Finland) Mika Immonen	4
(South Africa) Vincent Halliday	1
(Kuwait) Abdullah Alenzi	9

Winner’s Round
(Chinese Taipei) Hsieh Chia-chen	9
(Russia) Ruslan Chinakhov	8
(Poland) Mateusz Śniegocki	9
(Philippines) Jeffrey Ignacio	5
2nd playoff round
(Japan) Satoshi Kawabata	6
(Philippines) Jeffrey Ignacio	9
(Kuwait) Abdullah Alenzi	2
(Russia) Ruslan Chinakhov	9

=== Group 7 ===
Main Round
(Greece) Alexander Kazakis	9
(Slovakia) Jakub Koniar	8
(Chinese Taipei) Ko Ping-han	4
(Japan) Hayato Hijikata	9
(China) Xu Xiaocong	9
(Jordan) Ahmad Mohamad Sllah	8
(Qatar) Waleed Majid	9
(Chinese Taipei) Cheng Yu-hsuan	5
1st playoff round
(Slovakia) Jakub Koniar	4
(Chinese Taipei) Ko Ping-han	9
(Jordan) Ahmad Mohamad Sllah	2
(Chinese Taipei) Cheng Yu-hsuan	9

Winner’s Round
(Greece) Alexander Kazakis	9
(Japan) Hayato Hijikata	8
(China) Xu Xiaocong	6
(Qatar) Waleed Majid	9
2nd playoff round
(Chinese Taipei) Ko Ping-han	9
(China) Xu Xiaocong	7
(Chinese Taipei) Cheng Yu-hsuan	9
(Japan) Hayato Hijikata	5

=== Group 8 ===
Main Round
(Canada) Alex Pagulayan	9
(Lebanon) Mohammad Berjaoui	8
(Singapore) Sharik Aslam Sayed	5
(Japan) Tōru Kuribayashi	9
(Czech Republic) Roman Hybler	9
(Bangladesh) Mohammad al-Amin	8
(Iraq) Hasan Idan	4
(Chinese Taipei) Ko Pin-yi	9
1st playoff round
(Lebanon) Mohammad Berjaoui	6
(Singapore) Sharik Aslam Sayed	9
(Bangladesh) Mohammad al-Amin	6
(Iraq) Hasan Idan	9

Winner’s Round
(Canada) Alex Pagulayan	9
(Japan) Tōru Kuribayashi	8
(Czech Republic) Roman Hybler	1
(Chinese Taipei) Ko Pin-yi	9
2nd playoff round
(Singapore) Sharik Aslam Sayed	9
(Czech Republic) Roman Hybler	4
(Iraq) Hasan Idan	6
(Japan) Tōru Kuribayashi	9

=== Group 9 ===
Main Round
(Philippines) Carlo Biado	9
(Argentina) Jorge Llanos	3
(Russia) Sergei Luzker	9
(Vietnam) Nguyễn Anh Tuấn	8
(Poland) Wiktor Zieliński	7
(Japan) Tomoya Iima	9
(Iraq) Ameer Ali	5
(Vietnam) Dương Quốc Hoàng	9
1st playoff round
(Argentina) Jorge Llanos	2
(Vietnam) Nguyễn Anh Tuấn	9
(Poland) Wiktor Zieliński	9
(Iraq) Ameer Ali	8

Winner’s Round
(Philippines) Carlo Biado	9
(Russia) Sergei Luzker	5
(Japan) Tomoya Iima	9
(Vietnam) Dương Quốc Hoàng	7
2nd playoff round
(Vietnam) Nguyễn Anh Tuấn	9
(Vietnam) Dương Quốc Hoàng	5
(Poland) Wiktor Zieliński	9
(Russia) Sergei Luzker	7

=== Group 10 ===
Main Round
(China) Liu Haitao	9
(Qatar) Ali Abdulhadi	2
(Philippines) Marlon Manalo	6
(China) Wang Can	9
(Canada) Martin Daigle	8
(Finland) Casper Matikainen	9
(Iraq) Abdullah Falah	2
(Japan) Naoyuki Ōi	9
1st playoff round
(Qatar) Ali Abdulhadi	2
(Philippines) Marlon Manalo	9
(Canada) Martin Daigle	9
(Iraq) Abdullah Falah	3

Winner’s Round
(China) Liu Haitao	6
(China) Wang Can	9
(Finland) Casper Matikainen	4
(Japan) Naoyuki Ōi	9
2nd playoff round
(Philippines) Marlon Manalo	2
(Finland) Casper Matikainen	9
(Canada) Martin Daigle	6
(China) Liu Haitao	9

=== Group 11 ===
Main Round
(Germany) Thorsten Hohmann	6
(South Africa) Jason Theron	9
(Iran) Takhti Zarekani	6
(Poland) Tomasz Kapłan	9
(Austria) Maximilian Lechner	7
(Japan) Tomoo Takano	9
(Netherlands) Jimmy Worung	1
(China) Wu Jia-qing	9
1st playoff round
(Germany) Thorsten Hohmann	9
(Iran) Takhti Zarekani	7
(Austria) Maximilian Lechner	9
(Netherlands) Jimmy Worung	6

Winner’s Round
(South Africa) Jason Theron	5
(Poland) Tomasz Kapłan	9
(Japan) Tomoo Takano	9
(China) Wu Jia-qing	8
2nd playoff round
(Germany) Thorsten Hohmann	6
(China) Wu Jia-qing	9
(Austria) Maximilian Lechner	9
(South Africa) Jason Theron	5

=== Group 12 ===
Main Round
(England) Chris Melling	9
(Netherlands) Marc Bijsterbosch	2
(Iran) Ali Maghsoud	8
(South Africa) Richard Halliday	9
(Russia) Maxim Dudanez	6
(Japan) Yukio Akakariyama	9
(Poland) Wojciech Sroczyński	5
(Chinese Taipei) Wu Kun-lin	9
1st playoff round
(Netherlands) Marc Bijsterbosch	8
(Iran) Ali Maghsoud	9
(Russia) Maxim Dudanez	7
(Poland) Wojciech Sroczyński	9

Winner’s Round
(England) Chris Melling	9
(South Africa) Richard Halliday	3
(Japan) Yukio Akakariyama	7
(Chinese Taipei) Wu Kun-lin	9
2nd playoff round
(Iran) Ali Maghsoud	3
(Japan) Yukio Akakariyama	9
(Poland) Wojciech Sroczyński	9
(South Africa) Richard Halliday	3

=== Group 13 ===
Main Round
(Chinese Taipei) Ko Ping-chung	9
(Netherlands) Ivar Saris	6
(Greece) Nick Malai	9
(United States) Robert Hart	3
(Venezuela) Jalal Yousef	9
(Hungary) Olivér Szolnoki	5
(Poland) Marek Kudlik	1
(United States) Shane Van Boening	9
1st playoff round
(Netherlands) Ivar Saris	9
(United States) Robert Hart	3
(Hungary) Olivér Szolnoki	8
(Poland) Marek Kudlik	9

Winner’s Round
(Chinese Taipei) Ko Ping-chung	9
(Greece) Nick Malai	6
(Venezuela) Jalal Yousef	7
(United States) Shane Van Boening	9
2nd playoff round
(Netherlands) Ivar Saris	6
(Venezuela) Jalal Yousef	9
(Poland) Marek Kudlik	8
(Greece) Nick Malai	9

=== Group 14 ===
Main Round
(Estonia) Denis Grabe	3
(Myanmar) Phone Myint Kyaw	9
(Singapore) Toh Lian Han	3
(Hong Kong) Lo Ho Sum	9
(Russia) Konstantin Stepanov	9
(Chile) Enrique Rojas	8
(Chinese Taipei) Lin Ta Li	8
(China) Dang Jinhu	9
1st playoff round
(Estonia) Denis Grabe	9
(Singapore) Toh Lian Han	2
(Chile) Enrique Rojas	8
(Chinese Taipei) Lin Ta Li	9

Winner’s Round
(Myanmar) Phone Myint Kyaw	9
(Hong Kong) Lo Ho Sum	4
(Russia) Konstantin Stepanov	9
(China) Dang Jinhu	4
2nd playoff round
(Estonia) Denis Grabe	6
(China) Dang Jinhu	9
(Chinese Taipei) Lin Ta Li	9
(Hong Kong) Lo Ho Sum	6

=== Group 15 ===
Main Round
(Spain) Francisco Sánchez	9
(Myanmar) Aung Moe Thu	6
(Philippines) Roberto Brillantes	0
(Canada) John Morra	9
(Poland) Konrad Juszczyszyn	9
(Hong Kong) Kong Bu Hong	4
(United States) Thomas Tokoph	4
(Austria) Albin Ouschan	9
1st playoff round
(Myanmar) Aung Moe Thu	9
(Philippines) Roberto Brillantes	3
(Hong Kong) Kong Bu Hong	8
(United States) Thomas Tokoph	9

Winner’s Round
(Spain) Francisco Sánchez	9
(Canada) John Morra	2
(Poland) Konrad Juszczyszyn	9
(Austria) Albin Ouschan	4
2nd playoff round
(Myanmar) Aung Moe Thu	5
(Austria) Albin Ouschan	9
(United States) Thomas Tokoph	3
(Canada) John Morra	9

=== Group 16 ===
Main Round
(Germany) Ralf Souquet	9
(Maldives) Mohammed Hassan	3
(China) Bing Chen Gao	5
(Chinese Taipei) Lo Li-wen	9
(Qatar) Bashar Abdulmajeed	7
(Greece) Damianos Giallourakis	9
(South Korea) Kwon Hojun	8
(Chinese Taipei) Chang Jung-lin	9
1st playoff round
(Maldives) Mohammed Hassan	6
(China) Bing Chen Gao	9
(Qatar) Bashar Abdulmajeed	4
(South Korea) Kwon Hojun	9

Winner’s Round
(Germany) Ralf Souquet	9
(Chinese Taipei) Lo Li-wen	2
(Greece) Damianos Giallourakis	8
(Chinese Taipei) Chang Jung-lin	9
2nd playoff round
(China) Bing Chen Gao	9
(Greece) Damianos Giallourakis	7
(South Korea) Kwon Hojun	5
(Chinese Taipei) Lo Li-wen	9

== Finals ==
Round of 64
(Albania) Eklent Kaçi	11
(China) Bing Chen Gao	4
(Lebanon) Mazen Berjaoui	4
(Hong Kong) Robbie Capito	11
(China) Wang Can	9
(Vietnam) Nguyễn Anh Tuấn	11
(Greece) Nick Malai	5
(Germany) Joshua Filler	11
(Philippines) Roland Garcia	11
(Qatar) Waleed Majid	7
(Austria) Albin Ouschan	11
(Chinese Taipei) Hsieh Chia-chen	6
(Poland) Tomasz Kapłan	4
(Poland) Wiktor Zieliński	11
(Myanmar) Phone Myint Kyaw	2
(Philippines) Johann Chua	11
(Netherlands) Niels Feijen	11
(Kuwait) Bader al-Awadhi	4
(Chinese Taipei) Ko Ping-han	2
(Poland) Mateusz Śniegocki	11
(Japan) Tomoo Takano	5
(Finland) Casper Matikainen	11
(Poland) Radosław Babica	10
(Greece) Alexander Kazakis	11
(Japan) Naoyuki Ōi	10
(Spain) Francisco Díaz-Pizarro	11
(Canada) John Morra	6
(United States) Corey Deuel	11
(Russia) Konstantin Stepanov	8
(South Korea) Ryu Seung-woo	11
(Chinese Taipei) Liu Ri-teng	5
(Chinese Taipei) Ko Pin-yi	11
(Philippines) Carlo Biado	11
(Ukraine) Vitaly Patsura	9
(Chinese Taipei) Lo Li-wen	7
(Poland) Konrad Juszczyszyn	11
(Japan) Tomoya Iima	4
(China) Wu Jia-qing	11
(Japan) Tōru Kuribayashi	11
(Spain) Francisco Sánchez	7
(Philippines) Jeffrey Ignacio	9
(Finland) Petri Makkonen	11
(Poland) Wojciech Sroczyński	6
(Russia) Fedor Gorst	11
(Canada) Alex Pagulayan	6
(China) Liu Haitao	11
(Austria) Maximilian Lechner	4
(Chinese Taipei) Wu Kun-lin	11
(Chinese Taipei) Ko Ping-chung	8
(Japan) Yukio Akakariyama	11
(Chinese Taipei) Hsu Jui-an	8
(England) Chris Melling	11
(United States) Shane Van Boening	11
(Chinese Taipei) Cheng Yu-hsuan	7
(Venezuela) Jalal Yousef	11
(China) Dang Jinhu	10
(Philippines) Jeff de Luna	9
(Chinese Taipei) Lin Ta Li	11
(Singapore) Sharik Aslam Sayed	11
(Singapore) Aloysius Yapp	10
(Germany) Ralf Souquet	11
(Russia) Ruslan Chinakhov	6
(Kuwait) Omar Al-Shaheen	1
(Chinese Taipei) Chang Jung-lin	11

Round of 32
(Albania) Eklent Kaçi	10
(Hong Kong) Robbie Capito	11
(Vietnam) Nguyễn Anh Tuấn	6
(Germany) Joshua Filler	11
(Philippines) Roland Garcia	8
(Austria) Albin Ouschan	11
(Poland) Wiktor Zieliński	11
(Philippines) Johann Chua	5
(Netherlands) Niels Feijen	11
(Poland) Mateusz Śniegocki	1
(Finland) Casper Matikainen	9
(Greece) Alexander Kazakis	11
(Spain) Francisco Díaz-Pizarro	7
(United States) Corey Deuel	11
(South Korea) Ryu Seung-woo	4
(Chinese Taipei) Ko Pin-yi	11
(Philippines) Carlo Biado	11
(Poland) Konrad Juszczyszyn	7
(China) Wu Jia-qing	11
(Japan) Tōru Kuribayashi	6
(Finland) Petri Makkonen	11
(Russia) Fedor Gorst	8
(China) Liu Haitao	10
(Chinese Taipei) Wu Kun-lin	11
(Japan) Yukio Akakariyama	2
(England) Chris Melling	11
(United States) Shane Van Boening	11
(Venezuela) Jalal Yousef	7
(Chinese Taipei) Lin Ta Li	11
(Singapore) Sharik Aslam Sayed	7
(Germany) Ralf Souquet	6
(Chinese Taipei) Chang Jung-lin	11

Last 16
(Hong Kong) Robbie Capito	1
(Germany) Joshua Filler	11
(Austria) Albin Ouschan	11
(Poland) Wiktor Zieliński	8
(Netherlands) Niels Feijen	10
(Greece) Alexander Kazakis	11
(United States) Corey Deuel	11
(Chinese Taipei) Ko Pin-yi	9
(Philippines) Carlo Biado	11
(China) Wu Jia-qing	9
(Finland) Petri Makkonen	6
(Chinese Taipei) Wu Kun-lin	11
(England) Chris Melling	5
(United States) Shane Van Boening	11
(Chinese Taipei) Lin Ta Li	7
(Chinese Taipei) Chang Jung-lin	11

Quarter-finals
(Germany) Joshua Filler	11
(Austria) Albin Ouschan	6
(Greece) Alexander Kazakis	11
(United States) Corey Deuel	8
(Philippines) Carlo Biado	11
(Chinese Taipei) Wu Kun-lin	4
(United States) Shane Van Boening	11
(Chinese Taipei) Chang Jung-lin	8

Semi-finals
(Germany) Joshua Filler	11
(Greece) Alexander Kazakis	10
(Philippines) Carlo Biado	11
(United States) Shane Van Boening	6

Final
(Germany) Joshua Filler	13
(Philippines) Carlo Biado	10

=== Grand Final ===
Player	Lag	Rack																							Racks won
Player	Lag	1	2	3	4	5	6	7	8	9	10	11	12	13	14	15	16	17	18	19	20	21	22	23	Racks won
(Germany) Joshua Filler		1	1	1				1				1		1	1	1	1	1	1				1	1	13
(Philippines) Carlo Biado	•				1	1	1		1	1	1		1							1	1	1			10
