= 2023 WPA World Nine-ball Championship =

Cue-sports championship tournament

Tournament information
- Dates: 1–5 February 2023
- Venue: Targi Kielce Exhibition Centre
- City: Kielce, Poland
- Format: double-elimination, single-elimination
- Participants: 128

Final
- Champion: Francisco Sánchez Ruiz (ESP)
- Runner-up: Mohammad Soufi (SYR)
- Score: 13–10

The 2023 WPA World Nine-ball Championship was a professional nine-ball pool tournament held from 1 to 5 February 2023 at the Targi Kielce Exhibition Centre in Kielce, Poland. It was the 32nd edition of the WPA World Nine-ball Championship and was organised by the World Pool Association (WPA). The event had 128 participants contesting a double-elimination bracket until there was 64 players left for the knockout round.

The defending champion was Shane Van Boening who had defeated Albin Ouschan 13‍–‍6 in the previous years final. Van Boening lost in the last 16 stage to Dương Quốc Hoàng 10‍–‍11. Francisco Sánchez Ruiz won his first World nine-ball title, defeating Syrian player Mohammad Soufi 13–10 in the final. Sánchez Ruiz win added to the 2022 World Cup of Pool and U.S. Open Pool Championship that he had already won that season.

== Overview ==
The 2023 WPA World Nine-ball Championship was a professional nine-ball pool championship, organized and promoted by the World Pool Association (WPA) and Matchroom Sport. It was held at the Targi Kielce Exhibition & Congress Centre in Kielce, Poland, from February 1 to 5, 2023. The tournament featured 128 competitors, including the world's highest-ranked players and various international qualifiers.

Matches were played under alternate break rules. The 128 participants were split into 16 groups for a double-elimination stage, where matches were played as a race-to-nine racks. When 64 players remained, the format changed to a single-elimination knockout. In this stage, matches were race-to-11, with the exception of the final, which was a race-to-13. The defending champion was Shane Van Boening, who won the 2022 title by defeating Albin Ouschan 13–6.

Of the 128 participants, 100 were invited to the event on merit of their World nine-ball rankings. The rest of the field was made up of wildcard players. The top 64 players were seeded in the opening double-elimination round. All participants were required to pay a $500 entry fee.

=== Broadcasters ===
The 2023 championship was broadcast globally, with over 50 hours of live coverage provided through various broadcasters. Coverage of the main table was handled by major regional broadcasters, while auxiliary tables (Tables 2 and 3) were streamed via YouTube.

The primary broadcast partners for the event included:

Region	Broadcaster
Great Britain	Sky Sports
Europe	Viaplay
United States, Canada, Brazil, Italy, and Spain	DAZN
MENA Region	SSC
Philippines	Tap Auto
Australia	Foxtel
New Zealand	Sky Network
Czech Republic and Slovakia	Nova Sport
Hungary	AMC Network
Sub-Saharan Africa	SuperSport
Balkans (Serbia, Croatia, Bosnia)	Sport Klub

=== Prize fund ===
The total prize fund for the event was $325,000, with the winner's share being $60,000.

Position	Prize Money
Winner	$60,000
Runner-up	$30,000
Semi-finalists	$17,500
Quarter-finalists	$10,000
Last 16	$6,000
Last 32	$3,500
Last 64	$2,500
Total	$325,0000

== Tournament summary ==
=== Double elimination stage ===
The opening phase of the tournament utilized a double-elimination format, where the 128-player field was divided into 16 groups of eight. Matches in this stage were played as race-to-nine racks with alternate breaks. To advance to the final 64, a player had to win two matches before losing two.

Defending champion Shane Van Boening began his campaign with a 9–2 victory over Masato Yoshioka], US Open champion Francisco Sánchez Ruiz, defeated So Shaw 9–2 in his opening match. Several top-seeded players advanced through the winners' bracket without a loss, including Albin Ouschan, Mario He, and Jayson Shaw. In the winner's qualification round, 2019 winner Joshua Filler was defeated 7‍–‍ by Alex Pagulayan. Filler managed to qualify for the knockout stage by winning his subsequent match against James Georgiadis 9–2. Other high-profile players who advanced via the losers' bracket included David Alcaide and Naoyuki Ōi.

=== Knockout stage ===
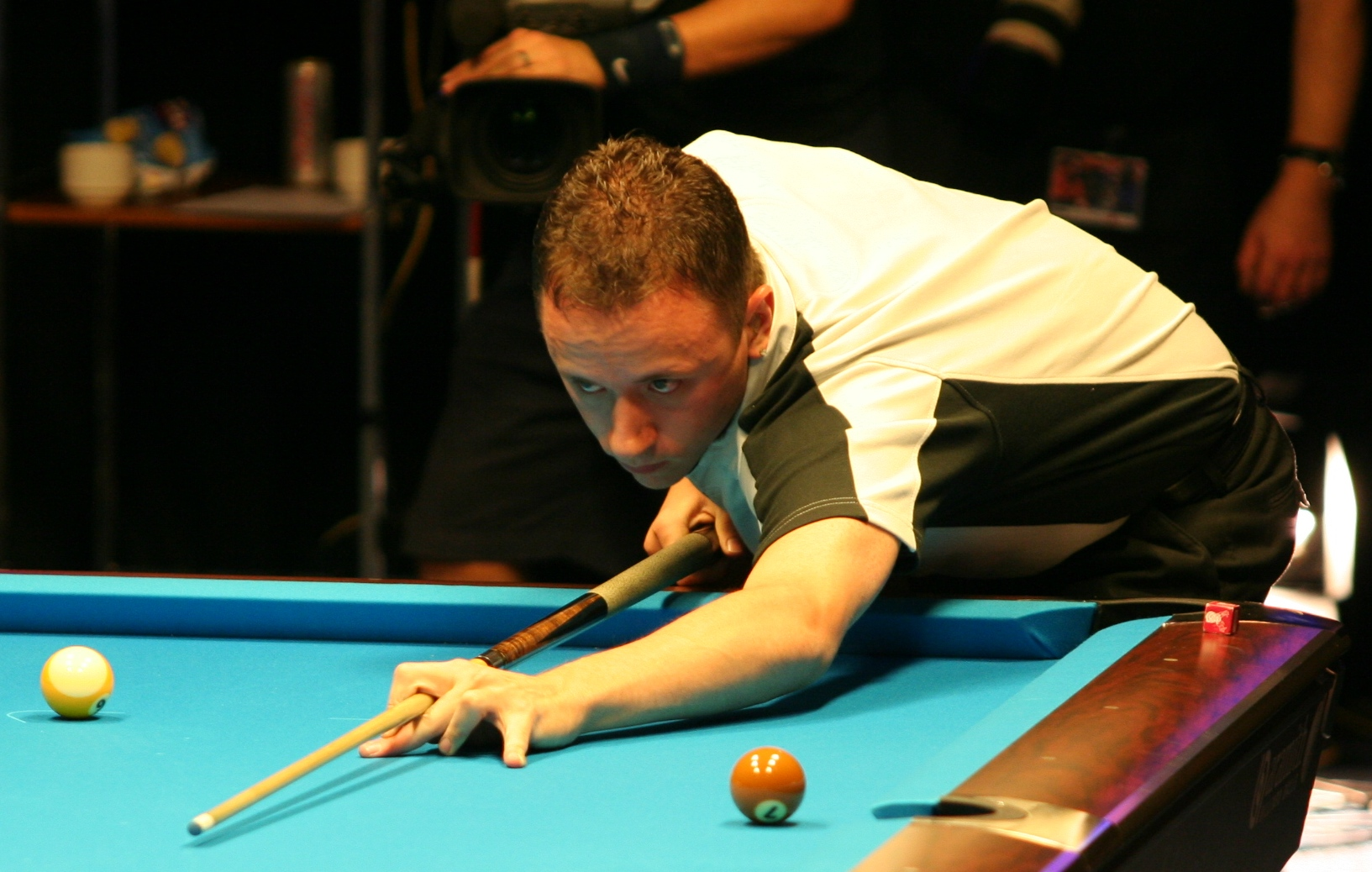
Defending champion Shane Van Boening (pictured in 2008) lost in the last 16 stage to Dương Quốc Hoàng.

The knockout stage commenced on February 3 with the remaining 64 players competing in a single-elimination bracket. Matches were played as a race-to-11 racks. The 32 players who went undefeated in the opening stage designated as seeds. They were drawn against the 32 players who qualified via the losers' bracket, who entered as unseeded competitors. Filler met Pagulayan again, this time defeating him 11‍–‍7. The two time WPA World Ten-ball Championship winner Eklent Kaçi lost in the first knockout round to Mario He 9‍–‍11. John Morra trailed 8‍–‍10 to Jayson Shaw but won the final three racks to win 11‍–‍10.

Defending champion Shane Van Boening defeated Aloysius Yapp in the last 32, but was eliminated by Vietnam's Dương Quốc Hoàng in the last 16. Hoang took an early 4–1 lead, and despite a comeback from Van Boening to reach hill-hill, Hoang ran the 21st rack to win 11–10. Former champion Thorsten Hohmann was defeated in the last 16 by Sánchez-Ruiz. Wiktor Zieliński trailed 1‍–‍6 to Moritz Neuhausen but won ten of the next thirteen to win 11‍–‍9. Twice winner Albin Ouschan defeated Poland's Mateusz Śniegocki 11‍–‍3 to reach the quarter-finals. The other remaining home player Zieliński was also defeated in the last 16 by Chang Jung-lin. Wu Kun-lin defeated Hoang, Soufi defeated Ouschan, Sánchez-Ruiz defeated Chang and He defeated Niels Feijen to reach the semi-finals.

The semi-finals were played on 5 February. Soufi went 6‍–‍0 ahead against Wu over a period of 45 minutes. Wu made a golden break as he won four of the next five racks. Soufi went to the hill after Wu mis-cued in rack 16 and completed a break and run to win 11‍–‍6. Sánchez Ruiz had defeated He in all of their last seven meetings. He won the first four racks, with Sánchez Ruiz picking up two of the next four to trail 2‍–‍6. In rack nine, a shot by Sánchez Ruiz saw the cue ball hit the back of the pocket, but did not drop. He won the rack, but won just one more rack as Sánchez Ruiz won the match 11‍–‍8.

The final was played on 5 February as a race to 13 racks. Soufi won the lag and won the first two racks, but Sanchez Ruiz won the next three to lead 3‍–‍2. Soufi won the next two racks, but scratched on the break as the score was tied 4‍–‍4. Sanchez Ruiz completed a break and run en route to a 6‍–‍4 lead, but Soufi won three of the next four racks to tie the match 7‍–‍7. From 8‍–‍8, Sanchez Ruiz won four of the next five racks to get to the Hill. With only three balls remaining, Sanchez Ruiz ran out of position in rack 22, allowing Soufi to get to 10 racks. In the next rack, Sanchez Ruiz won the match. Because of the win, Sanchez Ruiz now held three of the major pool tournaments, the World nine-ball, the World Cup of Pool and U.S. Open Pool Championship.

Following the tournament, Sanchez Ruiz retained his number one position in the world nine-ball rankings, whilst Soufi moved to world number fourteen. Sanchez Ruiz commented that winning the Derby City Classic the previous year had given him confidence to win more championships: "when I won the Derby City Classic last year, everything changed in my mindset. I was playing good but I had never won a big title. When you win a big one, your confidence goes through the roof." He commended his opponent, saying "I have never seen Mohammad play with such character. It’s amazing. You can feel his aggressive play and the crowd love him. This tournament will change Soufi’s career." Soufi responded "I am happy to be number two but I am ready for more". Sanchez Ruiz also held the 2022 WPA World Ten-ball Championship, only the third person, after Wu Jia-qing is 2005 and Ko Pin-yi in 2015 to hold both titles at the same time. Recalling his life prior to pool, living in war-torn Syria, Soufi commented that "to raise our flag high on such a global stage meant everything to me... we haven’t had many athletes in the spotlight, so I wanted to show that dreams are always worth chasing—no matter where you’re from."

== Knockout stage ==
The knockout draw for the last 64 stages follows; players in bold are match winners.

=== Section 1 ===
Round of 64
**Shane Van Boening (USA)**	**11**
Jani Uski (FIN)	2
**Aloysius Yapp (SGP)**	**11**
Chris Melling (GBR)	8
David Alcaide (ESP)	9
**Wojciech Szewczyk (POL)**	**11**
Lo Ho Sum (HKG)	5
**Dương Quốc Hoàng (VNM)**	**11**
**Maximilian Lechner (AUT)**	**11**
Ruben Bautista (MEX)	6
Nick van den Berg (NED)	5
**Johann Chua (PHI)**	**11**
**Naoyuki Ōi (JPN)**	**11**
Emil Gangflot (NOR)	4
Alexander Kazakis (GRE)	2
**Wu Kun-lin (TPE)**	**11**

Round of 32
**Shane Van Boening (USA)**	**11**
Aloysius Yapp (SGP)	9
Wojciech Szewczyk (POL)	1
**Dương Quốc Hoàng (VNM)**	**11**
**Maximilian Lechner (AUT)**	**11**
Johann Chua (PHI)	6
Naoyuki Ōi (JPN)	4
**Wu Kun-lin (TPE)**	**11**

Round of 16
Shane Van Boening (USA)	10
**Dương Quốc Hoàng (VNM)**	**11**
Maximilian Lechner (AUT)	9
**Wu Kun-lin (TPE)**	**11**

Quarter-finals
Dương Quốc Hoàng (VNM)	4
**Wu Kun-lin (TPE)**	**11**

=== Section 2 ===
Round of 64
**Sebastian Batkowski (POL)**	**11**
Francesco Candela (ITA)	8
Ali Alobaidli (QAT)	8
**James Aranas (PHI)**	**11**
Imran Majid (GBR)	10
**Mika Immonen (FIN)**	**11**
Marius Skoneczny (POL)	8
**Mohammad Soufi (SYR)**	**11**
Gerson Martinez (PER)	8
**Lars Kuckherm (GER)**	**11**
**Mateusz Śniegocki (POL)**	**11**
Fabio Petroni (ITA)	5
**Daniel Macioł (POL)**	**11**
Dimitri Jungo (SUI)	7
**Albin Ouschan (AUT)**	**11**
Tyler Styer (USA)	5

Round of 32
**Sebastian Batkowski (POL)**	**11**
James Aranas (PHI)	9
Mika Immonen (FIN)	10
**Mohammad Soufi (SYR)**	**11**
Lars Kuckherm (GER)	9
**Mateusz Śniegocki (POL)**	**11**
Daniel Macioł (POL)	9
**Albin Ouschan (AUT)**	**11**

Round of 16
Sebastian Batkowski (POL)	10
**Mohammad Soufi (SYR)**	**11**
Mateusz Śniegocki (POL)	3
**Albin Ouschan (AUT)**	**11**

Quarter-finals
**Mohammad Soufi (SYR)**	**11**
Albin Ouschan (AUT)	8

=== Section 3 ===
Round of 64
**Alex Pagulayan (CAN)**	**11**
Joshua Filler (GER)	9
**Aleksa Pecelj (SRB)**	**11**
Roman Hybler (CZE)	7
Sanjin Pehlivanović (BIH)	9
**Petri Makkonen (FIN)**	**11**
**Niels Feijen (GER)**	**11**
Ajdin Pinknjac (UGA)	10
Eklent Kaçi (ALB)	9
**Mario He (AUT)**	**11**
**Ko Ping-chung (TPE)**	**11**
Shane Wolford (USA)	10
**John Morra (CAN)**	**11**
Luong Duc Thien (VNM)	8
**Jayson Shaw (SCO)**	**11**
Besar Spahiu (HKG)	7

Round of 32
Alex Pagulayan (CAN)	6
**Aleksa Pecelj (SRB)**	**11**
Petri Makkonen (FIN)	9
**Niels Feijen (GER)**	**11**
**Mario He (AUT)**	**11**
Ko Ping-chung (TPE)	9
**John Morra (CAN)**	**11**
Jayson Shaw (GBR)	10

Round of 16
Aleksa Pecelj (SRB)	4
**Niels Feijen (GER)**	**11**
**Mario He (AUT)**	**11**
John Morra (CAN)	10

Quarter-finals
Niels Feijen (GER)	9
**Mario He (AUT)**	**11**

=== Section 4 ===
Round of 64
**Wiktor Zieliński (POL)**	**11**
Mickey Krause (DEN)	9
Jose Delgado (ESP)	7
**Moritz Neuhausen (GER)**	**11**
**Chang Jung-lin (TPE)**	**11**
Hunter Lombardo (USA)	9
**Ko Pin-yi (TPE)**	**11**
Jan Van Lierop (NED)	10
Konrad Juszczyszyn (POL)	7
**Nguyễn Anh Tuấn (VNM)**	**11**
Robie James (USA)	10
**Denis Grabe (EST)**	**11**
**Thorsten Hohmann (GER)**	**11**
Khalid Alghamdi (KSA)	7
**Francisco Sánchez Ruiz (ESP)**	**11**
Oscar Dominguez (USA)	3

Round of 32
**Wiktor Zieliński (POL)**	**11**
Moritz Neuhausen (GER)	9
**Chang Jung-lin (TPE)**	**11**
Ko Pin-yi (TPE)	5
Nguyễn Anh Tuấn (VNM)	5
**Denis Grabe (EST)**	**11**
Thorsten Hohmann (GER)	7
**Francisco Sánchez Ruiz (ESP)**	**11**

Round of 16
Wiktor Zieliński (POL)	7
**Chang Jung-lin (TPE)**	**11**
Denis Grabe (EST)	8
**Francisco Sánchez Ruiz (ESP)**	**11**

Quarter-finals
Chang Jung-lin (TPE)	4
**Francisco Sánchez Ruiz (ESP)**	**11**

=== Semi-finals onwards ===
Semi-finals
Wu Kun-lin (TPE)	6
**Mohammad Soufi (SYR)**	**11**
Mario He (AUT)	8
**Francisco Sánchez Ruiz (ESP)**	**11**

Final
Mohammad Soufi (SYR)	10
**Francisco Sánchez Ruiz (ESP)**	**13**
