= 2019 WPA World Nine-ball Championship =

WPA World 9-ball Championship 2019
Tournament information
- Sport: 9-ball
- Location: Doha, Qatar
- Dates: December 13, 2019–December 17, 2019
- Tournament format: Double elimination / Single Elimination
- Host: WPA World Nine-ball Championship
- Participants: 128

Final positions
- Champion: (Russia) Fedor Gorst
- Runner-up: (Chinese Taipei) Chang Jung-lin

The 2019 WPA World Nine-ball Championship was a nine-ball pool championship, which took place from December 13 to 17, 2019 at the al-Arabi Sports Club in Doha, Qatar. The defending champion was Germany's Joshua Filler, who won the 2018 event defeating Carlo Biado in the final 13–10.

Russian Fedor Gorst won the event, defeating Taipei's Chang Jung-lin in the final 13–11.

== Results ==
=== Finals ===
The following is results from the last-16 stage onwards.

First round
(Finland) Casper Matikainen	11
(Austria) Albin Ouschan	6
(Chinese Taipei) Chang Jung-lin	11
(Spain) Francisco Sanchez-Ruiz	7
(China) Liu Haitao	11
(Japan) Naoyuki Ōi	9
(Canada) Alex Pagulayan	11
(United States) Billy Thorpe	9
(Chinese Taipei) Ko Ping-chung	11
(Russia) Ruslan Chinakhov	4
(Vietnam) Do The Kien	11
(Qatar) Waleed Majid	8
(Chinese Taipei) Ko Pin-yi	11
(Singapore) Aloysius Yapp	9
(Russia) Fedor Gorst	11
(Poland) Mateusz Śniegocki	10

Quarter-finals
(Finland) Casper Matikainen	10
(Chinese Taipei) Chang Jung-lin	11
(China) Liu Haitao	11
(Canada) Alex Pagulayan	8
(Chinese Taipei) Ko Ping-chung	11
(Vietnam) Do The Kien	6
(Chinese Taipei) Ko Pin-yi	6
(Russia) Fedor Gorst	11

Semi-finals
(Chinese Taipei) Chang Jung-lin	11
(China) Liu Haitao	6
(Chinese Taipei) Ko Ping-chung	7
(Russia) Fedor Gorst	11

Final
(Chinese Taipei) Chang Jung-lin	11
(Russia) Fedor Gorst	13

==== Grand Final ====
Player	Lag	Rack																								Racks won
Player	Lag	1	2	3	4	5	6	7	8	9	10	11	12	13	14	15	16	17	18	19	20	21	22	23	24	Racks won
(Chinese Taipei) Chang Jung-lin	•	1	1		1		1				1	1	1	1			1					1		1		11
(Russia) Fedor Gorst				1		1		1	1	1					1	1		1	1	1	1		1		1	13
