= Nine-ball at the 2022 World Games – men's singles =

Nine-ball billiards men's singles at the 2022 World Games
- Venue: Birmingham Jefferson Convention Complex, Birmingham, United States
- Dates: 13–16 July 2022
- Competitors: 16 from 14 nations

Medalists
gold medal	(Germany) Joshua Filler
silver medal	(Bosnia and Herzegovina) Sanjin Pehlivanović
bronze medal	(Singapore) Aloysius Yapp

The men's singles nine-ball competition at the 2022 World Games took place from 13 to 16 July 2022 at the Birmingham Jefferson Convention Complex in Birmingham, United States.

== Competition format ==
A total of 16 players entered the competition. They competed in knock-out system.

== Bracket ==
Round of 16
(Austria) Albin Ouschan	11
(South Africa) Aden Carl Joseph	8
(Poland) Wiktor Zieliński	10
(Philippines) Carlo Biado	11
(Germany) Joshua Filler	11
(United States) Tyler Styer	10
(Peru) Gerson Martinez	5
(United States) Shane Van Boening	11
(Kuwait) Omar Al-Shaheen	DNF
(Bosnia and Herzegovina) Sanjin Pehlivanović	11
(Canada) John Morra	11
(United States) Hunter Lombardo	5
(Spain) Francisco Sánchez Ruiz	11
(Chinese Taipei) Ko Ping-chung	8
(New Zealand) Matt Edwards	3
(Singapore) Aloysius Yapp	11

Quarter-finals
(Austria) Albin Ouschan	7
(Philippines) Carlo Biado	11
(Germany) Joshua Filler	11
(United States) Shane Van Boening	3
(Bosnia and Herzegovina) Sanjin Pehlivanović	11
(Canada) John Morra	9
(Spain) Francisco Sánchez Ruiz	7
(Singapore) Aloysius Yapp	11

Semi-finals
(Philippines) Carlo Biado	8
(Germany) Joshua Filler	11
(Bosnia and Herzegovina) Sanjin Pehlivanović	11
(Singapore) Aloysius Yapp	7

Final
(Germany) Joshua Filler	11
(Bosnia and Herzegovina) Sanjin Pehlivanović	8
Third place
(Philippines) Carlo Biado	8
(Singapore) Aloysius Yapp	11
