= 2017 Portugal Open =

Dynamic Billiard Portugal Open
Tournament information
- Dates: 30 March–1 April 2017
- Venue: Salgados Palace Hotel
- City: Albufeira
- Country: Portugal
- Organisation: Euro Tour
- Format: Single Elimination
- Total prize fund: €36,000
- Winner's share: €4,500

Final
- Champion: (Netherlands) Nick van den Berg
- Runner-up: (Spain) David Alcaide
- Score: 9-5

The 2017 Dynamic Portugal Open was the second Euro Tour 9-Ball pool event in 2017. The event was won by Netherlands' Nick van den Berg who defeated Spain's David Alcaide 9–5 in the final. In winning the event, van den Berg won his tenth Euro Tour event.

The event was the last tournament in the European qualification for the 2017 World Games. David Alcaide and Joshua Filler qualified as first and second place of the one-year ranking of the Euro Tour, and competed at the 9-Ball men's event. The Games were won by Carlo Biado, with Filler losing in the last 16, and Alcaide in the quarter-finals.

== Tournament format ==
The event saw a total of 194 players compete, in a double-elimination knockout tournament, until the last 32 stage; where the tournament was contested as single elimination.

=== Prize fund ===
	Prize money
Winner	4.500 €
Finalist	€3.000
Semifinalist	€1.750
quarterfinalist	€1.250
last 16	€1.000
Last 32	€500
33–48 Place	€250
Total	€36.000

== Tournament results ==
1st Round
(Spain) David Alcaide	9
(Poland) Konrad Piekarski	5
(Portugal) Bruno Sousa	9
(Poland) Wojciech Sroczyński	8
(Russia) Konstantin Stepanov	4
(Netherlands) Marc Bijsterbosch	9
(Finland) Petri Makkonen	8
(Albania) Eklent Kaçi	9
(Switzerland) Ronald Regli	4
(Poland) Wiktor Zieliński	9
(Poland) Radosław Babica	8
(Germany) Sebastian Ludwig	9
(Netherlands) Marco Teutscher	7
(Czech Republic) Roman Hybler	9
(Portugal) Henrique Correia	6
(Germany) Ralf Souquet	9
(England) Mark Gray	9
(Sweden) Daniel Tångudd	0
(Russia) Jewgeni Buslajew	6
(Estonia) Denis Grabe	9
(Poland) Mateusz Śniegocki	7
(Norway) Mats Schjetne	9
(Sweden) Marcus Chamat	5
(Germany) Joshua Filler	9
(Ukraine) Witalij Pazura	9
(Russia) Fedor Gorst	5
(Netherlands) Nick van den Berg	9
(Poland) Konrad Juszczyszyn	5
(Spain) Francisco Sánchez	9
(Greece) Antonis Kakaris	3
(Poland) Tomasz Kapłan	9
(Netherlands) Niels Feijen	7

2nd Round
(Spain) David Alcaide	9
(Portugal) Bruno Sousa	5
(Netherlands) Marc Bijsterbosch	9
(Albania) Eklent Kaçi	4
(Poland) Wiktor Zieliński	9
(Germany) Sebastian Ludwig	7
(Czech Republic) Roman Hybler	2
(Germany) Ralf Souquet	9
(England) Mark Gray	9
(Estonia) Denis Grabe	6
(Norway) Mats Schjetne	5
(Germany) Joshua Filler	9
(Ukraine) Witalij Pazura	8
(Netherlands) Nick van den Berg	9
(Spain) Francisco Sánchez	5
(Poland) Tomasz Kapłan	9

Quarterfinals
(Spain) David Alcaide	9
(Netherlands) Marc Bijsterbosch	8
(Poland) Wiktor Zieliński	7
(Germany) Ralf Souquet	9
(England) Mark Gray	9
(Germany) Joshua Filler	8
(Netherlands) Nick van den Berg	9
(Poland) Tomasz Kapłan	6

Semifinals
(Spain) David Alcaide	9
(Germany) Ralf Souquet	6
(England) Mark Gray	3
(Netherlands) Nick van den Berg	9

Finals
(Spain) David Alcaide	5
(Netherlands) Nick van den Berg	9
