= 2015 WPA World Ten-ball Championship =

International pool tournament

2015 WPA World 10-Ball Championship
Tournament information
- Sport: Ten-Ball
- Location: SM City Activity Center; General Santos, Manila, Philippines
- Dates: February 17, 2015–February 21, 2015
- Tournament format: Round robin / Single Elimination
- Host: WPA World Ten-ball Championship
- Participants: 128

Final positions
- Champion: (Chinese Taipei) Ko Pin-yi
- Runner-up: (Philippines) Carlo Biado

The WPA 10-Ball World Championship 2015 was the fourth edition of the WPA World 10-ball Championship, the world championship for the discipline of 10-ball pool. It took place from February 17 to 21, 2015 at the SM City Activity Center in General Santos, Philippines.

Taiwan's Ko Pin-yi won the World Cup by beating Filipino Carlo Biado 11–9 in the final. In the semi-final, Ko defeated his younger brother Ko Ping-chung, whereas Biado won against Spaniard David Alcaide.

Defending champion was Dutchman Huidji See, who won the 2011 event but did not participate in this event.

Filipino boxer Manny Pacquiao successfully campaigned against the WPA to select his hometown, General Santos, as the venue for the event, in which he has already organized several pool-billiards tournaments. The tournament was attended by 128 players from over 20 countries. A total of $200,000 in prize money was distributed, the World Champion received $40,000.

== Format ==
The 128 participating players were divided into 16 groups, in which they competed in a double elimination tournament against each other. The remaining 64 players in each group qualified for the final round played in the knockout system.

=== Prize money ===
Below was the advertised prize fund for the event. However, shortly after the event, many players commented that they had not received the full prize funds for the event.

Position	Prize
First place (champion)	$40,000
Second place (runner-up)	$20,000
Third place (semi-finalist	$10,000
Fifth place (quarter-finalist)	$7,000
Ninth place (loser in round of 16)	$5,000
17th place (loser in round of 32)	$1,250
33rd place (loser in round of 64)	$700
65th place (loser in preliminaries)	$300

== Preliminary round ==
The preliminary round took place from February 17 to 19.

The following 32 players won once in the preliminary round and lost twice, which means early retirement and places 65 to 96:

- Pahdashong Shognosh
- (Singapore) Aloysius Yapp
- (India) Kamal Chawla
- (Chinese Taipei) Liu Cheng-chieh
- (Philippines) Desmothenes Pulpul
- (Qatar) Waleed Majid
- (Indonesia) Muhammad Zulfikiri
- (Philippines) John Rebong
- (Philippines) Ramil Gallego
- (India) Sundeep Gulati
- (Philippines) William Millares
- (Philippines) Val Pauay
- (Philippines) Sean Mark Malayan
- (Poland) Tomasz Kapłan
- (Philippines) Roland Garcia
- (Philippines) Oliver Medenilla
- (Philippines) Elvis Calasang
- (Croatia) Ivica Putnik
- (United States) Jani Sekkinen
- (Philippines) Raymart Camomot
- (Netherlands) Marc Bijsterbosch
- (Philippines) Richard Alinsub
- (Indonesia) Sahroni Sahroni
- (Philippines) Roland Dela Cruz
- (Philippines) Michael Feliciano
- (Philippines) Mark Aristotle Mendoza
- (Philippines) Assis Tadique
- (Philippines) Jerico Banares
- (Philippines) Leonardo Didal
- (Finland) Mika Immonen
- (Canada) Erik Hjorleifson
- (Philippines) Ricky Zerna

The following 32 players lost twice in the preliminary round, which means early retirement and places 97–128.

- (Philippines) Boots Augusto
- (Philippines) Christian Garlando
- (Malaysia) Ibrahim Bin Amir
- (Philippines) Antonio Lining
- (Philippines) Jordan Legaspi
- (Chinese Taipei) Hsu Kai-lun
- (Canada) Martin Daigle
- (India) Raj Hundal
- (Poland) Mateusz Śniegocki
- (United States) Vincent Goh
- (South Korea) Won Sik-ham
- (Philippines) Benjie Guevarra
- (United States) Hunter Lombardo
- (Singapore) Toh Lian Han
- (United States) Rodney Morris
- (Armenia) Babken Melkonyan
- (Chinese Taipei) Chen Hsing-ting
- (Chinese Taipei) Cheng Yu-hsuan
- (Philippines) Dante Razaran
- (Iran) Behzad Zareifrad
- (England) Daryl Peach
- (Philippines) Jomel Sultan
- (Italy) Daniele Corrieri
- (Germany) Thorsten Hohmann
- (Philippines) Mark Rodriguez
- (Russia) Konstantin Stepanov
- (Austria) Mario He
- (England) Imran Majid
- (Philippines) Jeffrey Calonge
- (Canada) Stephan Doiron
- (South Korea) Jeong Young-hwa
- (Philippines) Angelo Ariola

== Knockout round ==
The final round took place from February 19 to 21.

Round of 64
(Philippines) Jeff De Luna	10
(Philippines) Jundel Mazon	11
(Indonesia) Irsal Nasution	11
(Philippines) Dennis Orcollo	8
(Greece) Alexander Kazakis	10
(Chinese Taipei) Ko Pin-yi	11
(Poland) Michał Turkowski	10
(Mexico) Rubén Bautista	11
(Poland) Piotr Kudlik	10
(Chinese Taipei) Wu Kun-lin	11
(Sweden) Marcus Chamat	11
(Chinese Taipei) Chang Yu-lung	5
(England) Stuart Pettman	7
(Chinese Taipei) Yang Ching-shun	11
(Philippines) Baseth Mapandi	11
(Philippines) Oliver Villafuerte	4
(Philippines) Emil Martinez	9
(Chinese Taipei) Liu Ri-teng	11
(Chinese Taipei) Cheng Yu-hsuan	11
(Philippines) James Aranaz	4
(Philippines) Warren Kiamco	11
(Poland) Karol Skowerski	8
7
(England) Darren Appleton	11
(Canada) Jason Klatt	10
(Russia) Ruslan Chinakhov	11
(Philippines) Ruben Cuna	11
(Estonia) Denis Grabe	4
(Chinese Taipei) Ko Ping-chung	11
(Philippines) Patrick Gonzales	6
(Chinese Taipei) Hsu Jui-an	9
(Philippines) Jonas Magpantay	11
(Philippines) Francisco Bustamante	9
(Spain) David Alcaide	11
(Portugal) Manuel Gama	2
(Chinese Taipei) Chang Jung-lin	11
(Philippines) Raymund Faraon	11
(Philippines) Ryan Maglassang	5
(Netherlands) Marco Teutscher	9
(Poland) Mieszko Fortuński	11
(Germany) Ralf Souquet	9
(Philippines) Johann Chua	11
(China) Wang Can	11
(Philippines) Antonio Gabica	5
(Chinese Taipei) Fu Che-wei	11
(Philippines) Ronato Alcano	8
(Austria) Albin Ouschan	9
(Philippines) Lee Vann Corteza	11
(Philippines) Anton Raga	7
(England) Karl Boyes	11
(Philippines) Renemar David	10
(Poland) Radosław Babica	11
(Philippines) Carlo Biado	11
(Greece) Nikos Ekonomopoulos	7
(Philippines) Romero Silvano	11
(Philippines) Roberto Gomez	6
(Philippines) Elmer Haya	6
(Finland) Petri Makkonen	11
(Indonesia) Ricky Yang	11
(Canada) John Morra	7
(Philippines) Jerico Bonus	7
(China) Liu Haitao	11
(South Korea) Ryu Seung-woo	6
(Canada) Alex Pagulayan	11

Round of 32
(Philippines) Jundel Mazon	10
(Indonesia) Irsal Nasution	11
(Chinese Taipei) Ko Pin-yi	11
(Mexico) Rubén Bautista	3
(Chinese Taipei) Wu Kun-lin	10
(Sweden) Marcus Chamat	11
(Chinese Taipei) Yang Ching-shun	11
(Philippines) Baseth Mapandi	10
(Chinese Taipei) Liu Ri-teng	2
(Chinese Taipei) Cheng Yu-hsuan	11
(Philippines) Warren Kiamco	11
(England) Darren Appleton	5
(Russia) Ruslan Chinakhov	11
(Philippines) Ruben Cuna	8
(Chinese Taipei) Ko Ping-chung	11
(Philippines) Jonas Magpantay	7
(Spain) David Alcaide	11
(Chinese Taipei) Chang Jung-lin	8
(Philippines) Raymund Faraon	9
(Poland) Mieszko Fortuński	11
(Philippines) Johann Chua	11
(China) Wang Can	7
(Chinese Taipei) Fu Che-wei	8
(Philippines) Lee Vann Corteza	11
(England) Karl Boyes	6
(Poland) Radosław Babica	11
(Philippines) Carlo Biado	11
(Philippines) Romero Silvano	2
(Finland) Petri Makkonen	4
(Indonesia) Ricky Yang	11
(China) Liu Haitao	11
(Canada) Alex Pagulayan	10

Round of 16
(Indonesia) Irsal Nasution	5
(Chinese Taipei) Ko Pin-yi	11
(Sweden) Marcus Chamat	8
(Chinese Taipei) Yang Ching-shun	11
(Chinese Taipei) Cheng Yu-hsuan	9
(Philippines) Warren Kiamco	11
(Russia) Ruslan Chinakhov	10
(Chinese Taipei) Ko Ping-chung	11
(Spain) David Alcaide	11
(Poland) Mieszko Fortuński	7
(Philippines) Johann Chua	11
(Philippines) Lee Vann Corteza	10
(Poland) Radosław Babica	7
(Philippines) Carlo Biado	11
(Indonesia) Ricky Yang	6
(China) Liu Haitao	11

Quarter final
(Chinese Taipei) Ko Pin-yi	11
(Chinese Taipei) Yang Ching-shun	7
(Philippines) Warren Kiamco	1
(Chinese Taipei) Ko Ping-chung	11
(Spain) David Alcaide	11
(Philippines) Johann Chua	9
(Philippines) Carlo Biado	11
(China) Liu Haitao	7

Semi-final
(Chinese Taipei) Ko Pin-yi	11
(Chinese Taipei) Ko Ping-chung	2
(Spain) David Alcaide	2
(Philippines) Carlo Biado	11

Final
(Chinese Taipei) Ko Pin-yi	11
(Philippines) Carlo Biado	9
