= Premier League Pool =

Annual nine-ball pool tournament

Premier League Pool is an annual pool tournament. First held in 2022, Dương Quốc Hoàng is the reigning champion.

== Format ==
The tournament features sixteen players who play each other in a round-robin over five days. Six players are eliminated and the remaining ten players contest another round-robin group. The bottom four are eliminated, leaving six players to contest another group. The top four advance to the playoffs. Group-stage matches are best-of-nine with the alternate break format. In 2026, the winner received $25,000.

== History ==
Year	Winner	Result	Runner-up	Location	Ref
2022	(Austria) Albin Ouschan	7–5	(Germany) Joshua Filler	(England) Milton Keynes	
2023	(Spain) Francisco Sánchez Ruiz	7–4	(Scotland) Jayson Shaw	(England) Leicester	
2024	(United States) Shane van Boening	7–4	(Taiwan) Ko Pin-yi	(United States) Connecticut	
2025	(Germany) Moritz Neuhausen	7–0	(Spain) Francisco Sánchez Ruiz	(Bosnia and Herzegovina) Sarajevo	
2026	(Vietnam) Dương Quốc Hoàng	7–4	(Spain) Francisco Sánchez Ruiz	(United States) Miami	
