= AJ Manas =

Filipino pool player

Albert James Manas
Personal information
- Nickname: Starboy
- Born: April 10, 2007 (age 19)

Pool career
- Country: Philippines

Tournament wins
- Other titles: Reyes Cup

Albert James 'AJ' Manas is a professional pool player from the Philippines. Nicknamed Starboy, he was named Most Valuable Player (MVP) at the 2025 Reyes Cup. Manas finished runner-up at the 2026 WPA Men's Doubles 10-ball World Championship. He reached his first single major final at the 2026 Qatar World Cup Ten-ball Championship but lost to Joshua Filler 13–6.

== Career ==
Manas started playing pool aged seven in Antipolo, Philippines. He counted Efren Reyes and Francisco Bustamente as idols while growing up. In 2023, he won the Hanoi Junior Open and was a losing finalist at the TE Capital Nineball Open. He was selected to represent Asia in the 2025 Reyes Cup. Team Asia defeated Team Rest of World with Manas being named most valuable player (MVP). During the event, Manas defeated Fedor Gorst in a singles match, and helped secure the winning points in a doubles match with playing partner Carlo Biado. At the Philippines Open, Manas knocked out world champion Biado before suffering a defeat to Jayson Shaw in the quarter-finals.

In December 2025, Manas was victorious at the WWW International, overcoming William Johan in the final. The following month, he reached the final of the CTPBA Pro Tour finals, but lost in a final-frame decider to Ko Pin-yi.

He reached the last 16 of the 2026 Florida Open, but was beaten by Francisco Sánchez Ruiz. In October 2026, Manas and Biado finished runners-up to Spanish pair Sánchez Ruiz and David Alcaide at the WPA Men's Doubles 10-ball World Championship. They qualified for the final after beating the Indonesian pairing of Albert Januarta and Irsal Nasution in the semi-finals. Manas competed in the 2026 Reyes Cup, but Team Asia were defeated by Team Rest of the World.

On October 29, 2026, Manas made it to the final of the Qatar World Cup Ten-ball Championship, marking his first single major final. However, he lost to Joshua Filler 13–6. Despite not winning the tournament, Manas pocketed $40,000 for his runner-up finish.

== Titles ==
- 2025 Break 88 Pool Club Nine-ball Tournament
- 2025 WWW International Nine-ball
- 2025 Reyes Cup (MVP)
- 2025 Reyes Cup
- 2024 99 Billiards Tournament Nine-ball
- 2023 Hanoi Junior Open Championship
