= Philippines Open (pool) =

Annual nine-ball pool tournament

The Philippines Open Pool Championship is a nine-ball pool tournament which takes place in Manila, Philippines, that was first held in 2025. Johann Chua is the reigning champion.

== Background ==
The first edition of the Philippines Open was held in Gateway Mall, Quezon City, Philippines from 21 to 25 October 2025. AJ Manas defeated reigning world champion Carlo Biado, but he was subsequently defeated by Jayson Shaw. David Alcaide won the title. He defeated Robbie Capito 11–4 in the semi-finals before triumphing 11–3 against Arseni Sevastyanov in the final. Sevastyanov had earlier overcome Shaw in their semi-final match. In 2026, Johann Chua defeated Anton Raga 11–9 in an all-Filipino final. Chua secured his spot in the final after beating Bernie Regalario 10–2 in the semifinals, whereas Raga progressed with a victory over Baseth Mocaibat 10–6. Chua was presented with the Golden Filipino Sun trophy for his victory.

== History ==
Finals
Year	Winner	Result	Runner-up	Ref
2025	(Spain) David Alcaide	11–3	(Finland) Arseni Sevastyanov	
2026	(Philippines) Johann Chua	11–9	(Philippines) Anton Raga	
