= Reyes Cup =

Annual nine-ball pool tournament

The Reyes Cup is an annual nine-ball pool tournament contested between teams representing Asia and Rest of World. The inaugural staging in 2024 was contested between Asia and Europe. Similar in format to the Mosconi Cup, the inaugural event was held in Manila, Philippines, during October 2024 and is named after Filipino Hall of Fame player Efren Reyes, whom the event's organizers describe as being "widely regarded as the sport’s greatest-ever player."

Rest of the World are the defending champions.

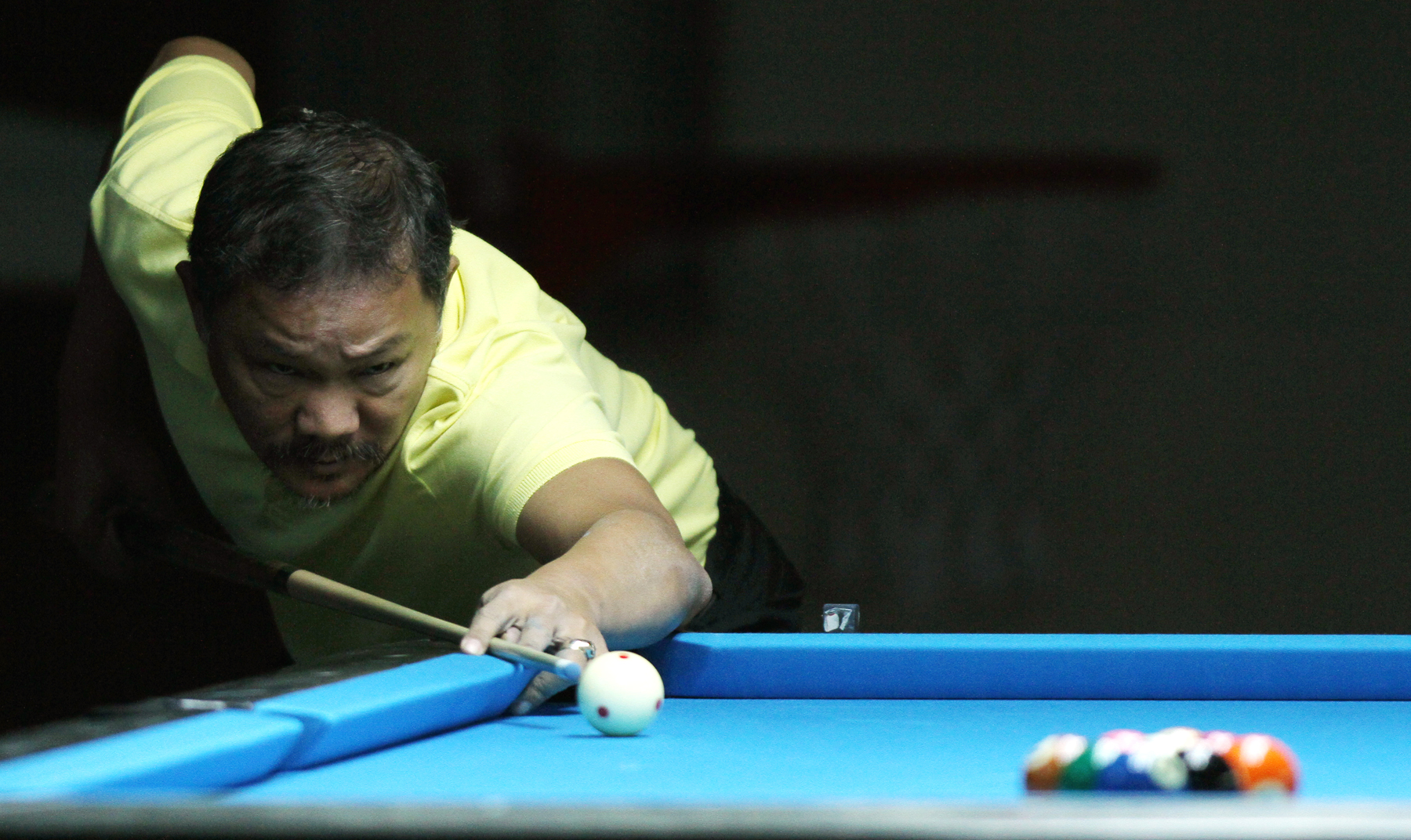
The Reyes Cup, named after Filipino billiards player Efren Reyes.

== Format ==
The contest is played over four days between two teams of five players. Three players for each team qualify automatically and each captain can pick two wildcards. There are twenty matches, each a best of nine racks with players having alternate breaks. The match winner wins one point and the first team to eleven points wins the Reyes Cup. On days one to three, the first match is a team match followed by a mixture of singles and doubles matches. Day four is just singles matches. In the event of a tie, each captain must select a player for a deciding match.

== History ==
In April 2024, a new nine-ball event was announced to be played in October 2024, similar to the Mosconi Cup, but held between Europe and Asia. Karl Boyes and Efren Reyes were announced as team captains for the inaugural staging of the event at Ninoy Aquino National Stadium. Europe's team comprised Jayson Shaw, Mickey Krause, Eklent Kaçi, David Alcaide and Francisco Sánchez Ruiz. The Asia team was Carlo Biado, Aloysius Yapp, Johann Chua, Ko Pin-yi and Dương Quốc Hoàng. Asia took a 3–2 lead on day one, and secured a day two whitewash to extend their lead to 7–2. On the third day, Asia took a 9–3 lead. On day four, Yapp won his match against Sánchez Ruiz to seal the victory as Asia won the event 11–6. Yapp was also crowned as the most valuable player.

In July 2025, it was announced that the second edition of the tournament would take place in Manila from 16–19 October 2025. In a change from the previous year, it was also stated that Asia would compete against a 'Rest of the World' side, instead of Europe. For the 2025 edition, Francisco Bustamante was captain of Team Asia, and Jeremy Jones captained Team Rest of the World. AJ Manas (Team Asia) and Fedor Gorst (Team Rest of the World) were also announced as among the tournament debutants. Team Asia secured a 4–0 whitewash on day one in the overall race to 11. Team Asia continued to dominate, and eventually won the event 11–3, with AJ Manas being named most valuable player.

For the 2026 edition, Bustamante returned as captain of Team Asia, and Ralf Souquet was announced as the new captain for Team Rest of the World. Joshua Filler, Shane van Boening, Aleksa Pecelj (Team Rest of the World), and Robbie Capito and Albert Januarta (Team Asia) made their debuts. Taking place at the Makati Coliseum in the Philippines, the teams tied the opening day 2–2, but on day two of the competition, Team Rest of the World established a 6–3 advantage. They continued to extend their lead and won 11–4 to beat Team Asia for the first time.

== Player appearances ==
The players to have appeared in the Reyes Cup:

| Legend | P = playing team member | NP = non-playing member |

=== Asian players ===
| Appearance | | Name | Country |
| P | NP | Name | Country |
|---|---|---|---|
| 3 | 0 | Carlo Biado | Philippines |
| 3 | 0 | Dương Quốc Hoàng | Vietnam |
| 2 | 0 | AJ Manas | Philippines |
| 2 | 0 | Johann Chua | Philippines |
| 2 | 0 | Aloysius Yapp | Singapore |
| 1 | 0 | Ko Pin-yi | Chinese Taipei |
| 1 | 0 | Robbie Capito | Hong Kong |
| 1 | 0 | Albert Januarta | Indonesia |
| 0 | 1 | Efren Reyes | Philippines |
| 0 | 2 | Francisco Bustamante | Philippines |

=== European / Rest of the World players ===
| Appearance | | Name | Country |
| P | NP | Name | Country |
|---|---|---|---|
| 3 | 0 | Francisco Sánchez Ruiz | Spain |
| 2 | 0 | Jayson Shaw | Scotland |
| 2 | 0 | Fedor Gorst | Russia |
| 1 | 0 | Eklent Kaçi | Albania |
| 1 | 0 | Mickey Krause | Denmark |
| 1 | 0 | David Alcaide | Spain |
| 1 | 0 | Moritz Neuhausen | Germany |
| 1 | 0 | Joshua Filler | Germany |
| 1 | 0 | Skyler Woodward | USA |
| 1 | 0 | Shane Van Boening | USA |
| 1 | 0 | Aleksa Pecelj | Serbia |
| 0 | 1 | Jeremy Jones | USA |
| 0 | 1 | Ralf Souquet | Germany |
| 0 | 1 | Karl Boyes | England |

== Player wins ==
The players to have been on a winning team in the Reyes Cup:

| Legend | WP = winning playing team member | WNP = winning non-playing member |

=== Asian players ===
| Appearance | | Name | Country |
| WP | WNP | Name | Country |
|---|---|---|---|
| 2 | 0 | Carlo Biado | Philippines |
| 2 | 0 | Johann Chua | Philippines |
| 2 | 0 | Dương Quốc Hoàng | Vietnam |
| 2 | 0 | Johann Chua | Philippines |
| 2 | 0 | Aloysius Yapp | Singapore |
| 1 | 0 | AJ Manas | Philippines |
| 1 | 0 | Ko Pin-yi | Chinese Taipei |
| 0 | 1 | Efren Reyes | Philippines |
| 0 | 1 | Francisco Bustamante | Philippines |

=== European / Rest of the World players ===
| Appearance | | Name | Country |
| WP | WNP | Name | Country |
|---|---|---|---|
| 1 | 0 | Francisco Sánchez Ruiz | Spain |
| 1 | 0 | Fedor Gorst | Russia |
| 1 | 0 | Joshua Filler | Germany |
| 1 | 0 | Shane Van Boening | USA |
| 1 | 0 | Aleksa Pecelj | Serbia |
| 0 | 1 | Ralf Souquet | Germany |

== Results by year ==
| Year | Venue | Winners | Score | Runners-up | MVP | Ref |
|---|---|---|---|---|---|---|
| 2024 | Manila, Philippines | Asia | 11‍–‍6 | Europe | (Singapore) Aloysius Yapp | |
| 2025 | Manila, Philippines | Asia | 11–3 | Rest of the World | (Philippines) AJ Manas | |
| 2026 | Makati, Philippines | Rest of the World | 11–4 | Asia | (Spain) Francisco Sánchez Ruiz | |
