= Nine-ball at the 2017 World Games – men's singles =

Nine-ball men's singles at the 2017 World Games
- Venue: Wroclaw Congress Center, Wrocław, Poland
- Dates: 26–29 July 2017
- Competitors: 16 from 15 nations

Medalists
gold medal	(Philippines) Carlo Biado
silver medal	(United Kingdom) Jayson Shaw
bronze medal	(Japan) Naoyuki Ōi

The men's singles nine-ball competition at the 2017 World Games took place from 26 to 29 July 2017 at the Wroclaw Congress Center in Wrocław, Poland.

== Bracket ==
Round of 16
(Austria) Albin Ouschan	11
(Morocco) Ameur Riad	1
(United States) Brandon Shuff	9
(Japan) Naoyuki Ōi	11
(Philippines) Carlo Biado	11
(Germany) Joshua Filler	5
(Poland) Mieszko Fortuński	11
(China) Wu Jia-qing	10
(United Kingdom) Jayson Shaw	11
(Chile) Alejandro Carvajal	8
(New Zealand) Matthew Edwards	11
(Russia) Ruslan Chinakhov	10
(Spain) David Alcaide	11
(United States) Shaun Wilkie	2
(Switzerland) Ronald Regli	2
(Chinese Taipei) Ko Pin-yi	11

Quarter-finals
(Austria) Albin Ouschan	9
(Japan) Naoyuki Ōi	11
(Philippines) Carlo Biado	11
(Poland) Mieszko Fortuński	9
(United Kingdom) Jayson Shaw	11
(New Zealand) Matthew Edwards	5
(Spain) David Alcaide	9
(Chinese Taipei) Ko Pin-yi	11

Semi-finals
(Japan) Naoyuki Ōi	7
(Philippines) Carlo Biado	11
(United Kingdom) Jayson Shaw	11
(Chinese Taipei) Ko Pin-yi	6

Final
(Philippines) Carlo Biado	11
(United Kingdom) Jayson Shaw	7
Third place
(Japan) Naoyuki Ōi	11
(Chinese Taipei) Ko Pin-yi	9
