= Johann Chua =

Filipino pool player (born 1992)

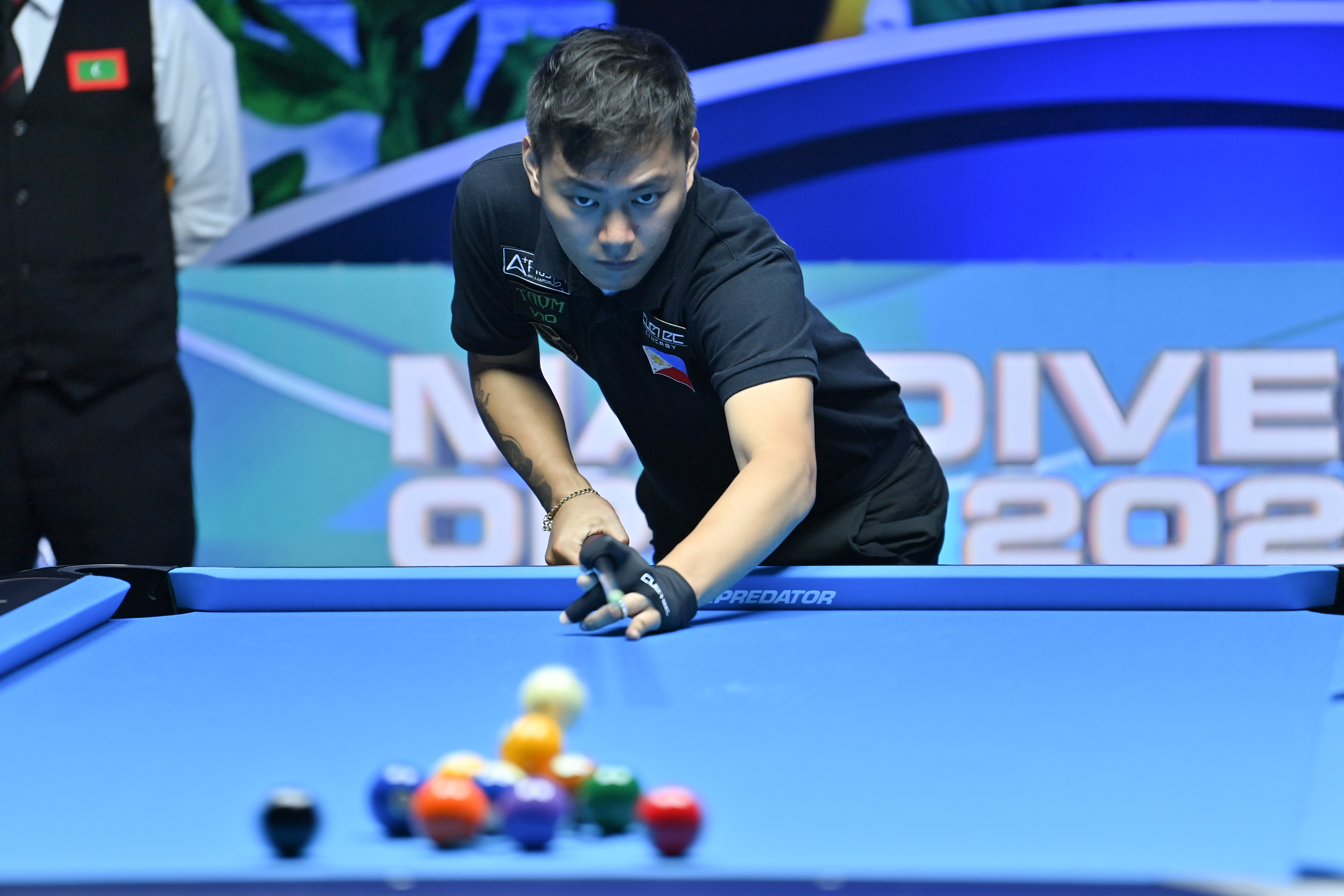
- Johann Chua at the 2023 Maldives 10-Ball Open Finals

Personal information
- Nickname: Bad Koi
- Born: Johann Gonzales Chua; May 31, 1992 (age 34) Bacolod, Negros Occidental, Philippines
- Occupation: Professional pool player
Medal record
Representing the Philippines
Men's Nine-Ball
World Cup of Pool
Gold medal – first place	2023 Spain	Doubles
Southeast Asian Games
Gold medal – first place	2021 Vietnam	Singles
Bronze medal – third place	2023 Cambodia	Doubles
Bronze medal – third place	2019 Philippines	Doubles
Bronze medal – third place	2017 Malaysia	Singles
Asian Indoor and Martial Arts Games
Bronze medal – third place	2017 Ashgabat	Doubles
Men's Ten-Ball
Southeast Asian Games
Silver medal – second place	2021 Vietnam	Singles

Johann Gonzales Chua is a Filipino professional pool player from Manila, Philippines. Known as "Bad Koi", Chua is a 2023 World Cup of Pool champion alongside James Aranas. He is a two-time All Japan Championship winner and a two-time Reyes Cup champion.

== Early life ==
Born and raised in Bacolod in the central Philippines, Chua began playing pool at the age of nine. He was often accompanied to the local pool hall by his father who gave him the nickname "Bubwit" or little mouse due to the fact that he was too little to be seen behind the pool table. Chua quit schooling at 13 to pursue his passion and began playing professionally at the age of 19.

== Career ==
In October 2011, Johann Chua was ninth at the BSCP National Open Pool Championships Overall. In December, he finished 17th at the Manny Pacquiao International Ten-ball championship held in General Santos. In November 2012, he achieved his first major international success with third place at the Japan Open. In 2013, he finished 17th at the China Open. He was third again at the Japan Open 2013.

In 2014, Chua reached the last 16 in the China Open but lost to the Taiwanese Chang Jung-lin. At the 2014 WPA World Nine-ball Championship that took place a few days later, he reached the quarterfinal round of the World Championship for the first time; he was defeated by his countryman Elmer Haya. In September 2014, Chua was seventh in the Manny Pacquiao Cup.

At the 2015 WPA World Ten-ball Championship, he reached the quarter-finals after defeating Ralf Souquet, Wang Can and Lee Vann Corteza, but was beaten by David Alcaide 11–9. At the 2015 WPA World Nine-ball Championship he lost to Yukio Akakariyama in the round of 64. In November 2015, Chua defeated Ralf Souquet, Lo Li-wen, Shane Van Boening, and fellow countryman Ronato Alcano 7–11 in the finals to clinch the All Japan Championship title, his first international title.

In 2017, Chua won a bronze medal at the Southeast Asian Games held in Malaysia after falling behind Duong Quoc Hoang of Vietnam in the semifinals. In September of that year, Chua, with partner Warren Kiamco, won the bronze medal in the Asian Indoor and Martial Arts Games held in Ashgabat, Turkmenistan. Before that year ended, Chua claimed his second All Japan Championship title after defeating compatriot Jundel Mazon 11–2.

In 2021, Chua won his first SEA games gold medal after beating compatriot Carlo Biado in the all-Filipino men's Nine-ball singles final 9–6 at the Ha Dong District Sporting Hall in Hanoi Vietnam. "I was really nervous. It’s my first time to compete in the SEA Games finals. I can’t get over it. It’s really different playing for flag and country", said Chua.

In the same event, Carlo Biado defeated Chua 9–3 in the men's Ten-ball singles event.

In 2022, the trio of Johann Chua, Carlo Biado and Rubilen Amit won the 2022 WPA World Teams Championship after defeating Great Britain 3–0 in the final in Klagenfurt, Austria. Great Britain was composed of Kelly Fisher, Jayson Shaw, and Darren Appleton. The victory gave the Philippines its first World Team Ten-ball title after runner-up finishes in 2010 and 2014, the last time the tournament was held before it was revived in 2022. On route to the finals, team Philippines defeated team Poland 3–1 in the quarterfinals, then outlasted team Germany 3–2.

In 2023, Chua and James Aranas gave the Philippines a record fourth World Cup of Pool title after defeating Joshua Filler and Moritz Neuhausen of Germany 11–7 in the final at the Pazo de Feiras e Congresos de Lugo in Spain. Chua and Aranas won a $60,000 (P3.32 million) purse. The Filipino duo knocked out reigning champion Spain A 7–5 in the opening round, defeated Spain B 7–2 in the second round, survived two hill-hill matches, winning 9–8 consecutively against former world cup champions Chinese Taipei in the quarterfinals and Austria in the semifinals, and lastly, an 11–7 success in the final against team Germany. The Philippines became the first nation to win the championship as an unseeded team.

In 2024, Chua made his deepest run in the World Pool Championship, making it to the semifinals before losing 11–6 against Albania's Eklent Kaci. Chua took an early 6–2 lead before Kaci rallied back, recording nine consecutive racks in a row to overcome Chua and advance to the finals of the event.

Also in 2024, Chua reached his first major matchroom final at the European Open Championship, but was defeated by Mickey Krause of Denmark by a score of 13–8 at Hotel Esperanto in Fulda, Germany.

Chua's runner-up finish secured his spot as the second overall pick to represent team Asia in the inaugural Reyes Cup, hosted in Manila, Philippines, from October 15 to 18, 2024.

On October 13, 2024, Chua clinched his first major world nine-ball title after winning the Hanoi Open Pool Championship, overcoming Taiwan's Ko Pin Yi 13–7 at Hanoi Indoor Games Gymnasium, Vietnam.

Chua finished the year by being a semifinalist at the World Pool Championship, and a finalist at the European Open. Chua's success at major tournaments placed him into the top ten of the world rankings, reaching fifth.

On October 18, 2024, team Asia won the inaugural Reyes Cup held at the Ninoy Aquino Stadium in Manila, Philippines. Johann Chua, Carlo Biado, Aloysius Yapp, Duong Quoc Hoang, and Ko Pin-yi made up the team, which is coached by the tournament namesake Efren Reyes. They defeated the European team 11–6 final. Team Europe consisted of Jayson Shaw, Eklent Kaçi, Francisco Sánchez Ruiz, David Alcaide, and Mickey Krause.

In February 2026, Chua defeated Aranas, 15–5, in an all-Filipino finals to take home the crown at the Pattaya Open Pool Championship in Chonburi, Thailand.

In October 2026, Chua claimed his second matchroom major title, defeating Anton Raga 11–9 in an all-Filipino final to win the Philippines Open Pool Championship.

== Titles ==
- 2026 Philippines Open Nine-ball Championship
- 2026 Duya Legends Aiplay Sport 5800 Charity Cup Championship
- 2026 Pattaya Open Nine-ball Championship
- 2025 Reyes Cup
- 2025 Battle of the Bull Nine-ball
- 2025 Knight Shot Dubai Open Nine-ball
- 2025 99 David Loman Cup Nine-ball
- 2025 Marboys Scotch Doubles Ten-ball Invitational
- 2025 Dragon Billiards Pro Series Ten-ball
- 2025 Hoang Phu Tho Pool Arena Open Nine-ball
- 2024 Marboys Nine-ball Open
- 2024 Reyes Cup
- 2024 Hanoi Open Pool Championship
- 2024 Shanghai Zen and Yuan8 Open Nine-ball
- 2024 Ibalong Festival Nine-ball Championship
- 2024 CPBA Nine-ball Teams Invitational (Philippines vs. Chinese Taipei)
- 2023 World Cup of Pool - with (James Aranas)
- 2022 Olongapo City Ten-ball Championship
- 2022 Beasley Open Nine-ball
- 2022 WPA World Mixed Teams Ten-ball Championship
- 2022 Bayugan Ten-ball Championship
- 2021 Southeast Asian Games Nine-ball Singles
- 2020 Manny Pacquiao Ten-ball Championship
- 2018 Maryland Ten-ball Bar table Championship
- 2018 Pool Classic Competition (Philippines vs. Chinese Taipei (Taiwan))
- 2017 All Japan Championship Ten-ball
- 2015 All Japan Championship Ten-ball
- 2014 B52 Ten-ball Championship
- 2010 Manny Pacquiao Ten-ball Championship
