= Anton Raga =

Filipino pool player (born 1997)

Personal information
- Nickname: The Dragon
- Born: November 14, 1997 (age 28) Philippines

Pool career
- Country: Philippines
- Best finish: Runner up at 2023 European Open Nine-ball

Tournament wins
- Other titles: SBA Philippine Open Nine-ball

Anthony Cortes Raga (born November 14, 1997) is a Filipino professional pool player from Cebu, Philippines, nicknamed "The Dragon". Raga reached the final of the 2023 European Open Pool Championship, however, would lose on hill-hill 13–12 to David Alcaide of Spain. In 2026, Raga made it to the final of the Philippines Open Pool Championship, but lost 11–9 to Johann Chua.

Raga was also a two time runner-up at China 9-Ball Open losing to Wu Jia-qing of China, 12–11, in 2019 and Joshua Filler of Germany, 11–5, in 2023.

== Career ==
Raga competed at the 2nd edition of the European Open Pool Championship in 2023, held at Hotel Esparando in Fulda, Germany. He climbed back from the losers' bracket and gained a berth in the knockout rounds by beating Mateusz Śniegocki of Poland in the round of 64, 10–8, and Ko Pin-yi of Chinese Taipei with a score of 10–0 in the Round of 32.

Raga went on to defeat John Morra of Canada, 10–4, in the round-of-16, Polish player Wojciech Szewczyk, 10–7, in the quarterfinals, and German Joshua Filler, 11–9, in the semifinals to set up a race-to-13 finale with Alcaide where he lost 13–12.

Raga was four balls away from winning the title when he hit the green six in the side pocket while attempting to carom it off the seven ball. Raga's error was capitalised on by Alcaide, who won the top prize of $30,000 for the champion. Raga's runner-up finish earned him $15,000.

In October 2026, Raga reached his second matchroom major final at the Philippines Open Pool Championship, however, he lost to his compatriot Johann Chua, 11–9.

== Titles and achievements ==
- 2026 Breakshot Billiards Ten-ball Open
- 2026 Japan Open Ten-ball
- 2025 SBA Philippine Open Nine-ball
- 2024 MassKara Ten-ball Open
- 2024 Bayugan City Ten-ball Open
- 2023 Sharks Master's Cup Ten-ball Open
- 2021 Manny Pacquiao Pamaskong Handog
- 2021 Manny Pacquiao Cup Ten-ball Open
- 2021 Quezon City Ten-ball Open
- 2020 Jancor Sinulog Open Tournament
- 2019 Manny Pacquiao Cup Ten-ball Open (Dec.)
- 2019 Manny Pacquiao Cup Ten-ball Open (Oct.)
- 2019 Cebu City Ten-ball Open
- 2018 Manny Pacquiao Cup Ten-ball Doubles
- 2018 Thailand Nine-ball Ranking Event
- 2016 Sunstar Cebu Nine-ball Open
- 2015 1st Visayas Summer Ten-ball Tournament
- 2013 Sunstar Cebu Nine-ball Challenge
