= Roland Garcia =

Filipino pool player

Personal information
- Born: 25 August 1979 (age 47)

Pool career
- Country: Philippines
- Best finish: Runner up at the 2017 WPA World Nine-ball Championship

Roland Garcia is a professional pool player from Magalang, Philippines. Garcia reached the final of the 2017 WPA World Nine-ball Championship; but lost 5–13 to Carlo Biado. Garcia had also reached the quarter-final of the China Open in 2016, and the last 32 of the world nine-ball championship in 2018.

== Titles ==
- 2026 Texas Open Nine-ball Championship
- 2026 Music City Open Nine-ball
- 2026 Music City Open Mini
- 2024 Music City Split Bracket Nine-ball
- 2023 Battle of the Bull One-Pocket
- 2023 Michigan Fall Classic Nine-ball
- 2023 Bayou State Classic Nine-ball
- 2023 Cajun Coast Classic Nine-ball
- 2023 Cajun Coast Classic Banks
- 2023 Emerald Billiards Nine-ball Barbox
- 2022 Cajun Coast Classic Banks
- 2021 Junior Norris Memorial Shoot Out Ten-ball
- 2020 Q-City Nine-ball Tour Stop
- 2018 Manny Pacquiao Ten-ball Championship
- 2018 Pool Classic Competition (Philippines vs. Chinese Taipei (Taiwan))
