= Mickey Krause =

Danish pool player

Personal information
- Nickname: The Viking
- Born: 12 December 2000

Pool career
- Country: Denmark

Tournament wins
- Major: 2024 European Open
- Other titles: 2024 Mosconi Cup

Mickey Krause is a Danish professional pool player nicknamed The Viking. He was the champion of the 2024 European Open and was also a member of the European team that won the 2024 Mosconi Cup.

== Career ==
Originally based in Herlev, Krause moved to the US after competing in the World Championship and reaching the semi-finals of the U.S. Open Eight-Ball Pool Championship in 2023, where he defeated Fedor Gorst during the tournament.

In June 2024 Krause won the Bucharest Open after defeating Hubert Lopotko 11–7 in the final, the victory marked his first ranking title on the World Nineball Tour.

He won his first major title in August 2024 when he won the European Pool Open in Fulda, Germany He beat Skyler Woodward in the semi-final and then defeated Johann Chua 13–8 in the final. The victory also clinched his place on the European team for the inaugural Reyes Cup. He was, however, unable to help Team Europe defeat Team Asia in the 2024 Reyes Cup, despite himself and Jayson Shaw coming from 0–3 down to win a doubles match against Johann Chua and Carlo Biado on the first day in Manila.

Krause was part of the European team that defeated Team USA 11–6 in the 2024 Mosconi Cup which was held in Florida. Krause was the only rookie in the competition.

Krause won his third nine-ball ranking title at the 2025 Scottish Open, where he defeated Aloysius Yapp 10–3 in the final. In 2026, he won the Universal Open HCMC.

== Titles ==
- 2026 Universal Open HCMC
- 2025 Jacoby Scottish Open Nine-ball
- 2025 Mini Derb Open Nine-ball
- 2024 Mosconi Cup
- 2024 European Open Nine-ball Championship
- 2024 Bucharest Open
