= Hard Times Cafe (chain restaurant) =

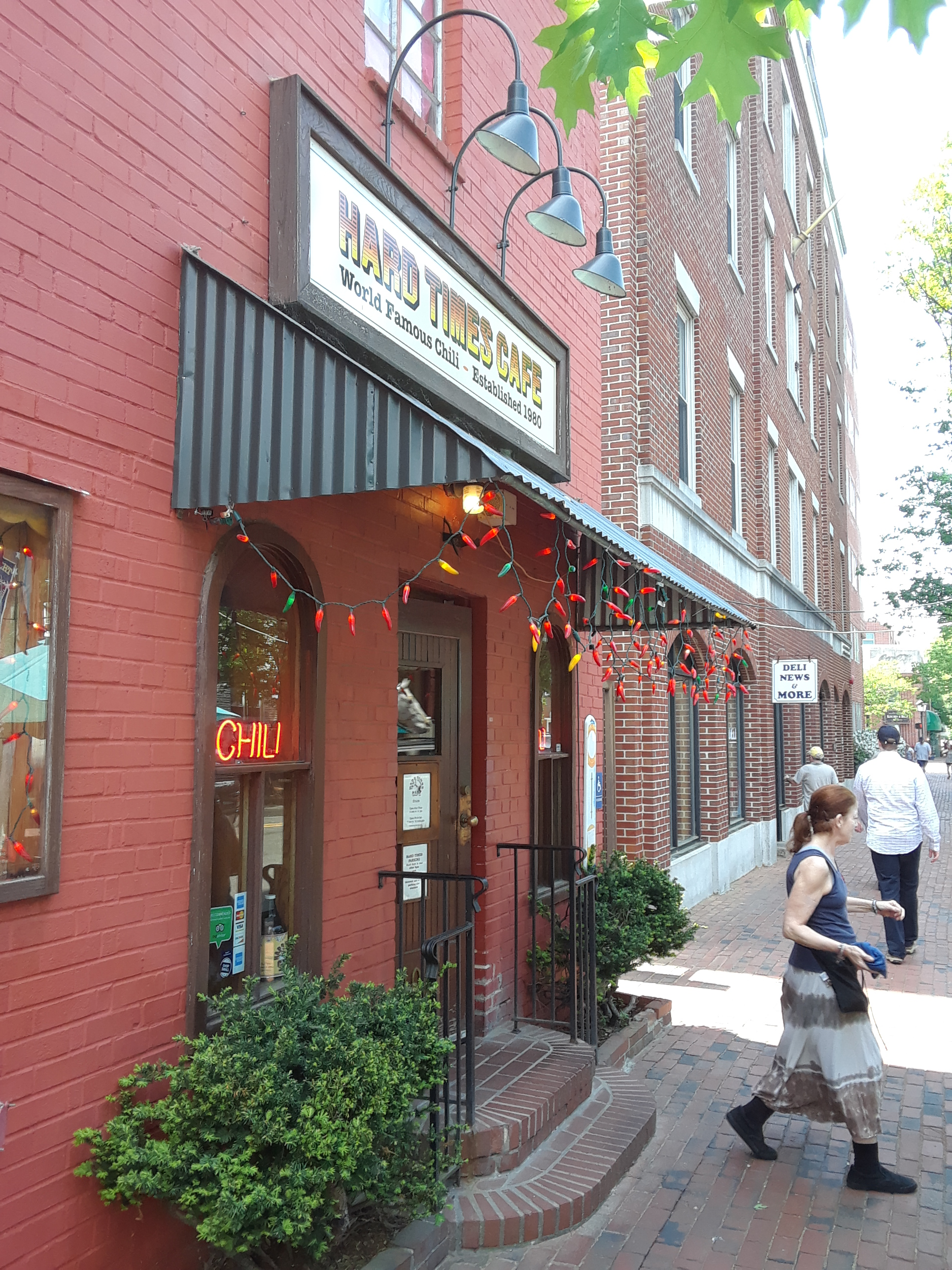
- An operating restaurant in Old Town Alexandria, Virginia

Restaurant information
- Established: 1980
- Owners: Jim and Fred Parker
- Location: 1404 King Street, Alexandria, Virginia, 22314, United States
- Other locations: 5 total locations
- Website: www.hardtimes.com

Hard Times Cafe (sometimes Hard Times Cafe & Cue) is a restaurant chain serving chili and other foods, primarily in the Maryland, Virginia, and Washington, D.C. area. Hard Times has been recognized in several publications, including USA Today, AOL's City's Best, Zagat's "Top 20 Area Restaurants" from 2003 to 2008, and several others.

== History ==
The first Hard Times Cafe was opened in Old Town Alexandria in 1980 by Jim and Fred Parker.

On September 21, 2011, Hard Times Cafe opened at Washington DC's Verizon Center sports (now Capital One) arena, home of the Washington Capitals, Wizards, Mystics, Georgetown Hoyas, concerts and events. Hard Times Cafe operated two locations on the Verizon Center's lower level concourse—a permanent stand at section 112 and a portable stand at section 119—offering fans a chance to enjoy chili macs, nachos, veggie nachos, chili tots, wings, and chili dogs. Until closing after the 2015 season, Hard Times also had a location at Nationals Park.

== Menu ==
Hard Times serves appetizers, burgers, and salads, but they are generally known for their chili. There are four types of chili available:

- Texas Chili
- Cincinnati Chili
- Terlingua Red
- Vegetarian Chili

== Locations ==
The original location is still in business today, in Alexandria, Virginia. There are a total of 4 locations:

| City | State | Type |
|---|---|---|
| Alexandria | Virginia | Hard Times Cafe |
| Fredericksburg (5099 Jefferson Davis Highway) | Virginia | Hard Times Cafe & Cue |
| Rockville | Maryland | Hard Times Cafe |
| Springfield | Virginia | Hard Times Cafe & Cue |

Additionally, Hard Times has had former locations that have subsequently been closed at the following sites:

| City | State | Type | Year closed |
|---|---|---|---|
| Bel Air | Maryland | Hard Times Cafe | 1993 (fire) |
| Bethesda | Maryland | Hard Times Cafe | 2016-ish |
| Clarendon | Virginia | Hard Times Cafe & Cue | 2016 |
| College Park | Maryland | Hard Times Cafe | 2022 |
| Fairfax | Virginia | Hard Times Cafe & Cue | 2019 |
| Frederick | Maryland | Hard Times Cafe & Cue | 2017 |
| Fredericksburg (314 Jefferson Davis Highway) | Virginia | Hard Times Cafe & Cue | 2020 |
| Germantown | Maryland | Hard Times Cafe & Cue | 2014 |
| Hagerstown | Maryland | Hard Times Cafe & Cue | 2017 |
| Herndon | Virginia | Hard Times Cafe & Cue | 2010 |
| Manassas | Virginia | Hard Times Cafe & Cue | 2017 |
| Nationals Park | Washington, D.C. | Left Field Concourse | 2015 |
| Verizon Center | Washington, D.C. | Lower Level Concourse | 2015 |
| Waldorf | Maryland | Hard Times Cafe & Cue | 2018 or 2019 |
| Woodbridge | Virginia | Hard Times Cafe & Cue | 2016 |
