= 2022 WPA World Nine-ball Championship =

Cue-sports championship tournament

WPA World 9-Ball Championship 2022
Tournament information
- Sport: 9-ball
- Location: Marshall Arena, Milton Keynes, England
- Dates: April 6–10, 2022
- Host(s): WPA World Nine-ball Championship, Matchroom Pool
- Participants: 128

Final positions
- Champion: Shane Van Boening (USA)
- Runner-up: Albin Ouschan (AUT)

The 2022 World Pool Championship was a cue sports tournament in the discipline of nine-ball contested during April 6–10, 2022, at the Marshall Arena in Milton Keynes, England.

The tournament had a prize pool of $325,000, with a $60,000 prize for the winner. The field consisted of 128 players with an initial match format of race-to-nine; once the field was reduced to 64 players, the format was race-to-11 until the championship match, which was a race-to-13. The defending champion was Albin Ouschan of Austria, who won the 2021 edition of the event. The tournament was won by Shane Van Boening of the United States, who defeated Ouschan in the championship match.
