= Dương Quốc Hoàng =

Vietnamese pool player

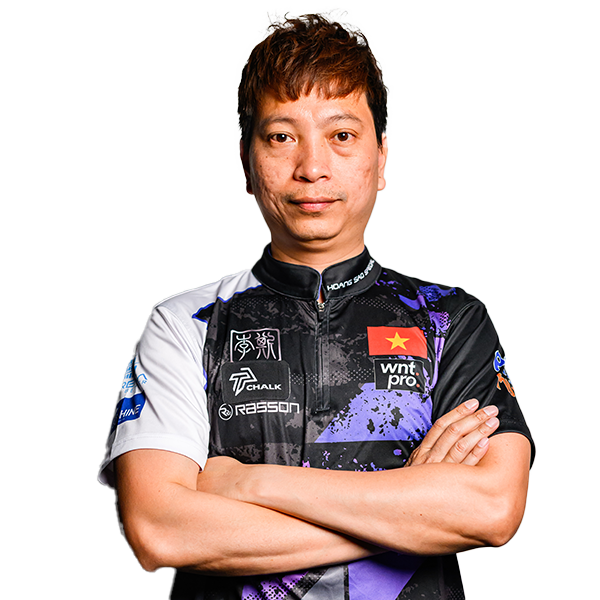
- Dương Quốc Hoàng - Hoàng Sao - The Martian

Personal information
- Nicknames: The Martian, Hoàng Sao
- Born: May 19, 1987 (age 39) Quang Ninh
- Website: https://hoangsao.vn/about-us/

Pool career
- Country: Vietnam

Tournament wins
- Other titles: 2024 Scottish Open, 2024 Reyes Cup, 2025 Reyes Cup

Dương Quốc Hoàng, known as "The Martian" or "Hoang Sao", is a Vietnamese professional pool player. In 2026, he became the first Vietnamese player to win a major title in pool, winning the Premier League Pool in 2026. Dương is also a back-to-back Reyes Cup champion, having represented Team Asia in 2024 and 2025.

== Early life ==
Dương Quốc Hoàng grew up in Quang Ninh. He began playing pool at a young age but stopped when he entered high school. At the age of 23, he moved to Ho Chi Minh City to find a new life, despite having no specific job prospects. At that time, Dương Quốc Hoàng had only 2 millions VND (approx. $100 in 2010) to his name, with no job or place to stay.

In Ho Chi Minh City, Hoang found employment as a waiter at Sao Billiards Club. It was from this club that he adopted his nickname "Hoàng Sao". The income from the job was not high, but it allowed him time to practice. His talent was noticed by Luu Minh Phuc, a billiards owner and player. Phuc became Hoang's mentor and provided him with lodging, billiards equipment, and travel to tournaments.

== Career ==
In 2017 he became the National Champion and also won a silver medal at the 2017 SEA Games. In 2019, at the Beijing Open, he defeated Shane Van Boening for the first time. In February 2023 Dương Quốc Hoàng again defeated Shane Van Boening, this time during the World Pool Championship in Poland.

His victory in the 2024 Scottish Open in Scotland made him the first player from Vietnam to win a tournament on the World Nineball Tour. He defeated Oscar Dominguez 10‍–‍8 in the final. En route to the final, he defeated Carlo Biado, Francisco Sánchez Ruiz, Eklent Kaçi and Ko Pin-yi during the event.

In October 2024, Dương Quốc Hoàng was part of Team Asia, which defeated Team Europe 11–6 in Reyes Cup in Manila, Philippines

Dương Quốc Hoàng began his 2025 international campaign with a victory at the Battle of the Bull when he defeated Fedor Gorst, the reigning World Champion, with a score of 9–6. Later in the year, he competed in the World Pool Championship hosted in Ho Chi Minh City. He advanced to the Last 16, securing a 3–2 victory against Joshua Filler during the tournament before being eliminated 2–3 by Aloysius Yapp. In October 2025, he rejoined Team Asia for the second edition of the Reyes Cup, contributing to the team's 11–3 victory over Team Rest of World.

In Vietnamese domestic tournaments, Dương Quốc Hoàng started the season by winning the Predator Challenge of Champions in January. In December, he won the HBSF MIN Table Championship and the Poison Eight-ball Championship.

During the Lunar New Year of 2026, Dương Quốc Hoàng defeated Francisco Sánchez Ruiz 7-4 to win the Premier League Pool, making it his first major victory on the Matchroom World Nine-ball Tour and becoming the first Asian player to claim the title. He is also the first Vietnamese player to win a major title in his home country.

== Personal life ==
Dương Quốc Hoàng owns Hoang Sao Special Billiards Club - a billiards hall under his name.

== Titles ==
- 2026 Premier League Pool
- 2025 Poison Eight-ball Championship
- 2025 HBSF MIN Table
- 2025 Reyes Cup
- 2025 National Ten-ball Championship
- 2025 Predator Vietnam Challenge of Champions
- 2024 Reyes Cup
- 2024 National Nine-ball Championship
- 2024 Jacoby Scottish Open Nine-ball
- 2021 National Ten-ball Championship
- 2020 National Ten-ball Championship
- 2019 National Ten-ball Championship
- 2017 Sea Games Silver Medal
- 2017 National Nine-ball Championship
- 2014 Vietnam National Games Ten-ball
