= Omar Al-Shaheen =

Kuwaiti pool player

Personal information
- Born: 3 September 1992 (age 33)

Pool career
- Country: Kuwait
- Best finish: Runner-up 2021 WPA World Nine-ball Championship

Tournament wins
- Highest rank: 4

Omar Al-Shaheen (Arabic: عمر الشاهين) (born on 3rd September 1992) is a professional pool player from Kuwait. Al-Shaheen reached his highest ranking on the World Pool-Billiard Association rankings in 2022, reaching 4th in the world. In 2018, He won 45th Annual Texas Open 9-Ball Championship. At the 2021 WPA World Nine-ball Championship, Al-Shaheen reached the final before losing to Albin Ouschan 9–13.

== Titles ==
- 2019 Big Tyme Classic Open 9-Ball
- 2018 Texas Open 9-Ball Championship
