= Mohammad Soufi =

Syrian pool player

Personal information
- Born: May 10, 1993 (age 33)

Pool career
- Country: Syria; Germany
- Career prize money: $24,893

Mohammad Khaled Soufi (born May 10 1993) is a Syrian professional pool player. He came runner up at the 2023 WPA World Nine-ball Championship in Kielce.
