= Chang Yu-lung =

Taiwanese pool player

Personal information
- Born: 20. century

Pool career
- Country: Chinese Taipei
- Pool games: 9-Ball, 10-Ball

Tournament wins
- Major: 2015 World Cup of Pool
- Highest rank: 29

Chang Yu-lung is a Taiwanese pool player, and winner of the 2015 World Cup of Pool alongside Ko Pin-yi. Yu-Lung won the 2015 Steinway Classic defeating Ko Ping-chung in the final.

== Titles ==
- 2015 World Cup of Pool - with (Ko Pin-yi)
- 2014 China Open 9-Ball Championship
- 2015 Steinway Classic 10-Ball
- 2010 China Open 9-Ball Championship
