= Ko Ping-chung =

Taiwanese pool player (born 1995)

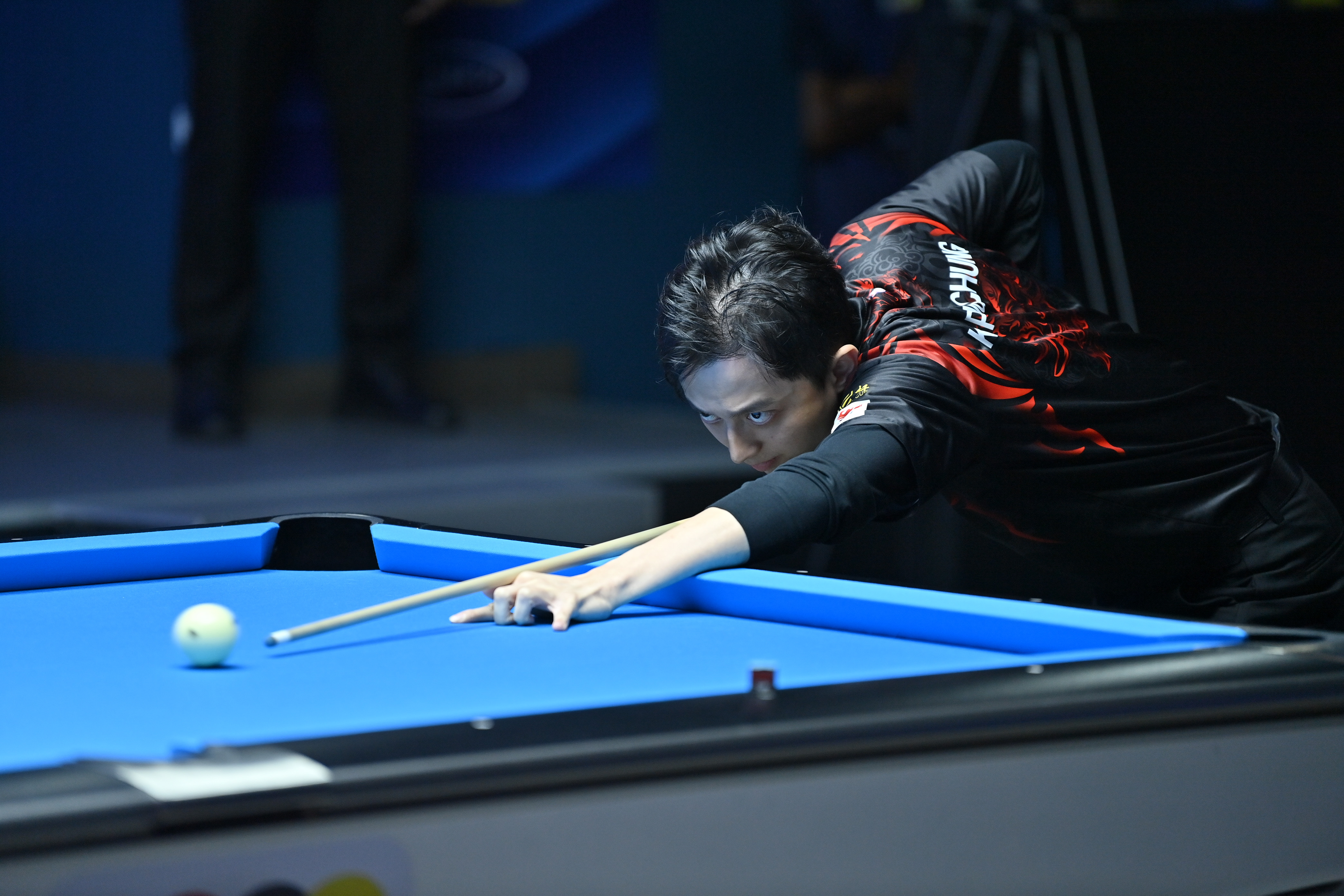
- Ko Ping-chung at the 2023 Maldives 10-Ball Open Finals

Personal information
- Nickname: "King Killer"
- Born: 18 September 1995 (age 30)

Pool career
- Country: Taiwan
- Turned pro: 2010
- Pool games: Nine-ball, Ten-ball

Tournament wins
- Major: U.S. Open Nine-ball Championship, (2023)
- World Champion: Ten-ball (2019, 2025)
- Current rank: 42 (WPA)
- Highest rank: WPA#1 in 2020 / WNT#3 in 2023

Ko Ping-chung (also Ko Pin-chung, born 18 September 1995) is a Taiwanese professional pool player. Ko is the younger brother of Ko Pin-yi. He is a two-time World Ten-ball Championship winner and a U.S. Open Nine-ball Championship winner.

== Career ==
In November 2010, Ko Ping-chung reached his first major final the All Japan Championship. However, he lost in the final against the German Thorsten Hohmann. In May 2011, he reached the knockout round of a men's world championship for the first time at the 2011 WPA World Ten-ball Championship and lost in the last 64 match against Darren Appleton 8–9. At the 2011 WPA World Nine-ball Championship he would lose in the preliminary round. In November 2013, he managed to win 8–5 in the final against Poland Sebastian Batkowski to become Junior World 9-ball Champion.

At the 2014 WPA World Nine-ball Championship Ko Ping-chung lost in the preliminary round. One month later he finished second in the CSI U.S. Open 10-Ball Championship and won the CSI U.S. Open 8-Ball Championship in the final against Shane Van Boening. In February 2015, Ko reached the semi-finals of the 2015 WPA World Ten-ball Championship, where he played his brother Ko Pin-yi, who would eventually win the event. At the 2015 WPA World Nine-ball Championship he also reached the semi-finals but was defeated by Shane Van Boening 1–11. In November 2015, he made the final at the Steinway Classic, but he lost to his compatriot Chang Yu-lung. In the 2016 WPA World Nine-ball Championship he lost in the quarterfinals 10–11 against Alex Pagulayan.

In 2011, Ko teamed with his brother to form the Taiwanese side that lost to Nitiwat Kanjanasri and Kobkit Palajin at the World Cup of Pool in the semi-final.

In July 2019, Ko won the 2019 WPA World Ten-ball Championship, defeating Joshua Filler 10–7 in the final. Later that year, he reached the semi-finals of the 2019 WPA World Nine-ball Championship, losing to eventual champion Fedor Gorst.

In July 2023, Ko Ping-chung reigns supreme in the inaugural Sharks International Nine-ball Open finals after defeating Filipino Michael Feliciano, 17–13, held at the Sharks Great White Arena in Tomas Morato, Quezon City Philippines.

Chung, a former world ten-ball champion overcame an early 5–2 deficit and shattered a 12–12 tie, claiming five of the final six racks to snatch the title worth $30,000(P1.6 million) while Feliciano settled for the runner-up finish and $15,000 pot (P823,755).

"It was a long week of matches against professionals and amateurs from around the globe and I'm honored to have played with them. I'm also grateful to the Sharks Billiard League for setting the stage and giving us the chance to compete with great opponents and for providing a very comfortable and world-class arena for us," said Ko.

On his way to the finals, Chung bested local pool hustlers Jaycee Garcia, Israel Rota, World Cup of Pool winner James Aranas, Japanese Naoyuki Oi and Patric Gonzales in the competition before facing Feliciano in the final.

In 2023, Ko won the U.S. Open Nine-ball Championship. With the final four racks against Max Lechner in the quarter-final and the 11–0 semi-final whitewash over Aloysius Yapp, he reached the final with 15 consecutive racks. Trailing 3–6 against Fedor Gorst, he won ten consecutive racks to win the biggest title of his career.

In 2025, due to his 1-year absence in previous WPA ranking events (the WNT-WPA conflict issue), Ko came through from the qualification tournament to participate in WPA World Ten-ball Championship. As an unseeded player, Ko eventually won the gold medal by defeating the WPA world number 1 player Alex Kazakis in the final match with the score 3 sets to 1 [4:0 4:2 1:4 4:3]. This success also let Ko join Eklent Kaçi to be the only two male players in history who have won the World Ten-ball twice.

== Titles ==
- 2026 Asian Pool Championship Ten-ball
- 2025 CTPBA Pro Nine-ball Tour IV
- 2025 WPA World Ten-ball Championship
- 2025 CTPBA Pro Nine-ball Tour I
- 2024 Bandung Open Ten-ball Championship
- 2023 Chinese Taipei Open 9-Ball Championship
- 2023 U.S. Open Nine-ball Championship
- 2023 Sharks International Nine-ball Open
- 2023 Maldives Open Ten-ball Championship
- 2019 Formosa Cup Asian Nine-ball
- 2019 WPA World Ten-ball Championship
- 2014 CSI U.S. Open Eight-ball Championship
- 2013 WPA World Nine-ball Junior championship
