= Carlo Biado =

Filipino pool player (born 1983)

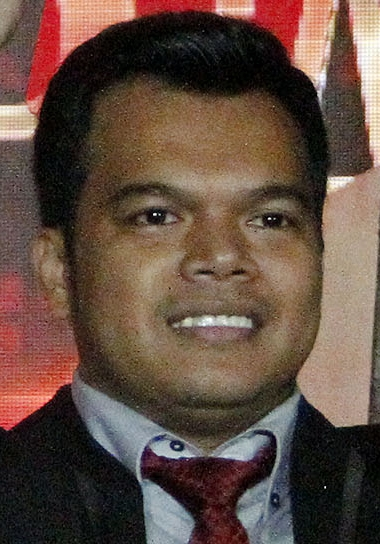
- Biado in 2018

Personal information
- Nickname: "The Black Tiger"
- Born: October 31, 1983 (age 42) Philippines

Pool career
- Country: Philippines
- Turned pro: 2004
- Pool games: Nine-ball, ten-ball, eight-ball, one-pocket, rotation

Tournament wins
- Major: U.S. Open (2021)
- World Champion: Nine-ball (2017, 2025), Ten-ball (2024)
- Current rank: 2
- Highest rank: 1
Medal record
Representing Philippines
Event	1st	2nd	3rd
World Games	1	0	0
Asian Indoor and Martial Arts Games	0	0	1
Southeast Asian Games	3	2	3
Total	4	2	4
Men's Nine-ball
Representing Philippines
World Games
Gold medal – first place	2017 Wrocław	Singles
Asian Indoor and Martial Arts Games
Bronze medal – third place	2017 Ashgabat	Singles
Southeast Asian Games
Gold medal – first place	2015 Singapore	Doubles
Gold medal – first place	2017 Kuala Lumpur	Singles
Silver medal – second place	2021 Vietnam	Singles
Bronze medal – third place	2015 Singapore	Singles
Bronze medal – third place	2019 Philippines	Doubles
Bronze medal – third place	2023 Cambodia	Doubles
Men's Ten-ball
Representing Philippines
Southeast Asian Games
Gold medal – first place	2021 Vietnam	Singles
Silver medal – second place	2013 Naypyidaw	Singles

Carlo Biado (born October 31, 1983) is a Filipino professional pool player known as "The Black Tiger". Biado is a multiple world champion, becoming the first-ever Filipino player to win World Nine-ball Championship twice (in 2017 and 2025) and the World Ten-ball Championship in 2024.

== Early life ==
Biado has roots in Rosario, La Union and/or Nueva Ecija. He started playing pool when he was age 13 and worked as a caddie at the Villamor Air Base golf course while he was still a student. After work he would play billiards in the evening. He stopped pursuing high school education when he was on his first year and the sport serves as a means of livelihood. He earned money from bets in the billiards place he helped manage.

== Career ==
Carlo Biado at 2022 International 9-Ball Open

Biado became a professional pool player in 2004 but failed to win any titles until 2010. In 2015, Biado reached the final of the WPA World Ten-ball Championship, defeating David Alcaide and Nikos Ekonomopoulos in the knockout rounds. Biado eventually lost the final to Taiwan's Ko Pin-yi 9–11.

In 2017, Biado defeated Jayson Shaw of the UK 11–7 to win the men's 9-ball event of the 2017 World Games. Also in 2017, Biado defeated countryman Roland Garcia, 13–5, to win the 2017 WPA World Nine-ball Championship. The following year, Biado reached the final of the 2018 event, where he lost 10–13 to Joshua Filler.

Biado reached the final of the 2019 WPA Players Championship, losing to Kevin Cheng 12–11.

A month after, Biado and De Luna booked a spot in the final of 2019 World Cup of Pool by beating the Netherlands duo of Neils Feijen and Marc Bijsterbosch, 9–6 in the semi-final but eventually fell short in the finals against Austria after losing 11–3.

The tandem of Carlo Biado and Jeff de Luna was unable to clinch the country's fourth title against the team of Mario He and Albin Ouschan who claimed their second title in their third consecutive finals appearance.

In 2021, Biado moved to the United States upon the encouragement of his wife amidst the lack of tournaments in the Philippines due to the COVID-19 pandemic. In the same year, Biado defeated Aloysius Yapp, 13–8, to win the U.S. Open Pool Championship. With the win, Biado became one of the few Filipino players to win the tournament along with Alex Pagulayan and Efren Reyes.

Also in 2021, Biado defeated fellow Filipino Johann Chua, 9–3, to win the men's ten-ball singles gold medal in the 31st Southeast Asian Games at the Hà Đông District Sporting Hall in Vietnam. This is his third gold in the SEA Games, on top of his three silver and two bronze medals.

In 2022, the trio of Johann Chua, Carlo Biado and Rubilen Amit emerged victorious in the 2022 WPA World Teams Championship after whitewashing Great Britain's Jayson Shaw, Kelly Fisher and Darren Appleton 3–0 in the final in Klagenfurt, Austria. On the road to the finals, team Philippines beat team Poland 3–1 in the quarter-finals, before outlasting team Germany in the semis, 3–2, in a shootout battle. With the win, they gave the Philippines its first world team ten-ball title after runner-up finishes in 2010 and 2014, the last time the tournament was held before it was revived in 2022.

In 2024, Biado secured his first World Nineball Tour ranking event title of the year, after defeating Bernie Regalario 13–7 to win the second Universal Chinese Taipei Open in an all-Filipino final championship match held at the Hulks Billiard Hall in Taipei, Taiwan. After losing his first match, Biado fought his way back from the losers bracket to go 8–1 in the 96-player field tournament.

Also in 2024, Biado defeated Naoyuki Ōi of Japan 4–1, 3–4, 4–2, and 4–1 to win the WPA World Ten-ball Championship held at the Rio All Suite Hotel and Casino in Las Vegas, Nevada. Biado also reached the final of the Las Vegas Open a week prior, but was defeated by fellow countryman Lee Vann Corteza.

Biado won the inaugural Ho Chi Minh City Open Championship in Hồ Xuân Hương Gymnasium, Vietnam on September 29, 2024, defeating Mario He of Austria 13–8 and took home $35,000 (1.9m) in prize money.

On October 18, 2024, Carlo Biado and his teammates won the inaugural Reyes Cup held at the Ninoy Aquino Stadium in Manila, Philippines. He, along with Johann Chua, Aloysius Yapp, Dương Quốc Hoàng, and Ko Pin Yi, made up team Asia, coached by Efren Reyes. Team Asia defeated its European counterpart, consisting of Jayson Shaw, Mickey Krause, Eklent Kaçi, David Alcaide and Francisco Sánchez Ruiz, with a 11–6 final score.

In 2025, Biado defeated world number one and defending champion Fedor Gorst of USA with a 15–13 final victory to become the only Filipino player to win the World Nine-ball Championship twice. Biado took home prize money of $250,000.

In October 2026, Biado and AJ Manas ended runners-up to Spanish pair Sánchez Ruiz and Alcaide at the WPA Men's Doubles 10-ball World Championship.

== Personal life ==
Biado is married to a woman named Niecky with whom he has five children. He is a resident of Muntinlupa.

== Titles and achievements ==
- 2026 Predator Indonesia Ten-ball Championship
- 2026 U.S. Open One-pocket Championship
- 2026 WPA World Mixed Teams Ten-ball Championship
- 2025 Asian Pool Championship Ten-ball
- 2025 Reyes Cup
- 2025 Billiard Congress of America Hall of Fame
- 2025 WPA World Nine-ball Championship
- 2024 Reyes Cup
- 2024 Ho Chi Minh City Open Nine-ball Championship
- 2024 Raxx MVP Tour Nine-ball Open
- 2024 CPBA Nine-ball Teams Invitational MVP
- 2024 CPBA Nine-ball Teams Invitational (Philippines vs. Chinese Taipei)
- 2024 WPA World Ten-ball Championship
- 2024 Chinese Taipei Open Nine-ball Championship
- 2023 Raxx MVP Tour Nine-ball Open
- 2023 Manny Pacquiao Ten-ball Championship
- 2022 Predator Puerto Rico Open
- 2022 Texas Open Ten-ball Scotch Doubles
- 2022 WPA World Mixed Teams Ten-ball Championship
- 2022 CSI U.S. Open Eight-ball Championship
- 2021 Big Tyme Classic One Pocket
- 2021 Cajun Coast Classic Nine-ball
- 2021 Southeast Asian Games Ten-ball Singles
- 2021 Abu Dhabi Open Nine-ball Championship
- 2021 US Open Nine-ball Championship
- 2020 Predator One Pool Ten-ball
- 2018 Pool Classic Competition (Philippines vs. Chinese Taipei (Taiwan))
- 2018 Jogja Open International Ten-ball
- 2017 Philippine Sportsman of the Year
- 2017 WPA World Nine-ball Championship
- 2017 World Games Nine-ball Singles
- 2017 Southeast Asian Games Nine-ball Singles
- 2015 Japan Open Ten-ball
- 2015 Southeast Asian Games Nine-ball Doubles
- 2013 Hard Times Ten-ball Open
- 2012 Green Garden Jakarta Ten-ball Open
- 2012 Banjarmasin Nine-ball Championship
- 2011 BSCP National Eight-ball Pool Championship
- 2011 BSCP National Pool Championship Overall
- 2010 Manny Pacquiao Ten-ball Championship
