= Casper Matikainen =

Finnish pool player (born 1997)

Pool

Representing Finland

European Championships
Bronze medal – third place	2026	Eight-ball
Gold medal – first place	2025	Nine-ball
Gold medal – first place	2022	Teams competition
Silver medal – second place	2019	Ten-ball
Gold medal – first place	2018	Eight-ball, U23
Bronze medal – third place	2017-2019	5 pcs, U23
Bronze medal – third place	2015	2 pcs., jr.
	Finnish	Championships
Gold medal – first place	2026	Nine-ball
Gold medal – first place	2026	Ten-ball
Gold medal – first place	2025	Nine-ball
Bronze medal – third place	2025	Teams competition
Gold medal – first place	2024	Scotch doubles, Nine-ball
Gold medal – first place	2024	Straight_pool
Bronze medal – third place	2024	Eight-ball
Gold medal – first place	2024	Nine-ball
Gold medal – first place	2023	Scotch doubles, Nine-ball
Gold medal – first place	2023	Ten-ball
Silver medal – second place	2022	Teams competition
Gold medal – first place	2021	Ten-ball
Gold medal – first place	2020	Eight-ball
Gold medal – first place	2019	Scotch doubles, Nine-ball
Gold medal – first place	2019	Teams Competition
Gold medal – first place	2017	Scotch doubles, Nine-ball

Casper "Cappe" Matikainen (born 12 September 1997) is a Finnish professional pool player. He has received a silver medal in the 2019 European Pool Championship, losing to Mieszko Fortuński, and the teams competition gold medal in the 2022 European Pool Championship. A member of the Espoo Billiard Club, he won the first tournament of the Finnish Pool Tour in Mikkeli in September 2023.

In April 2024 Casper won the Finnish Pool championship in nine-ball.

During spring 2024 Casper has also won two Kaisa competitions. First the Kymin kerho Open and a week after that, the Scotch doubles Finnish championship with teammate Joonas Lounamaa.

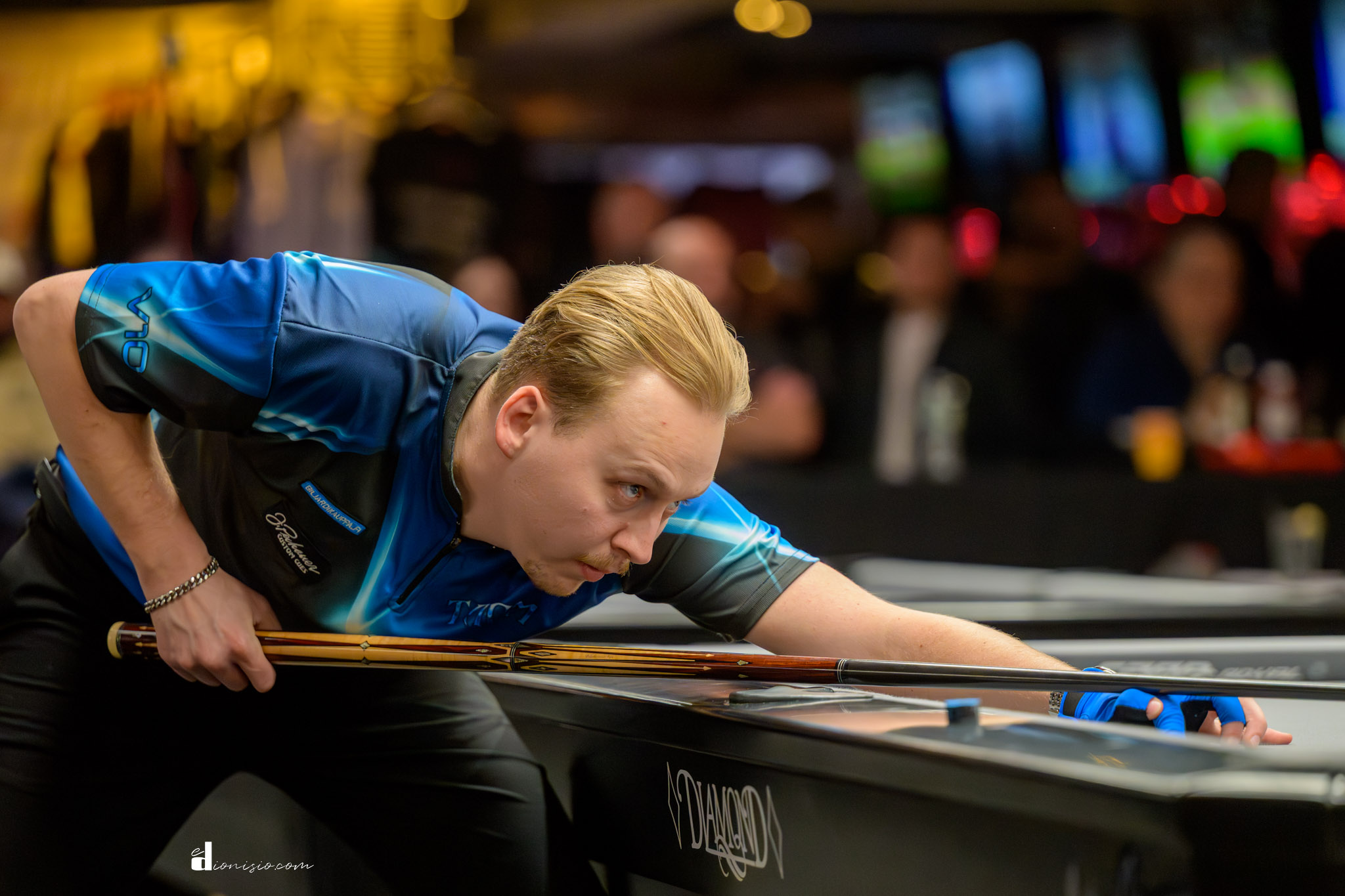
Casper Matikainen in New York spring 2026. Photographer: Erwin Dionisio.

== Titles & Achievements ==
- 2020 Finnish Pool Championship 8-ball
- 2021 Finnish Pool Championship 10-ball
- 2023 Finnish Pool Championship 10-ball
- 2024 Finnish Pool Championship 9-ball
- 2024 Finnish Pool Championship 14.1
- 2025 European Pool Championship 9-Ball
- 2025 Finnish Pool Championship 9-ball
- 2026 Finnish Pool Championship 10-ball
- 2026 Finnish Pool Championship 9-ball
