= Aloysius Yapp =

Singaporean pool player (born 1996)

Aloysius Yapp 叶浚惟
Personal information
- Nickname: "Majin Buu"
- Born: 2 May 1996 (age 30) Singapore

Pool career
- Country: Singapore
- Pool games: Nine-ball, Ten-ball
- Best finish: winner at 2025 US Open 9-Ball Championship

Tournament wins
- Major: UK Open Nine-ball Championship (2025), Florida Open Nine-ball Championship (2025), US Open Nine-ball Championship (2025)
- World Champion: Eight-ball (2026)
- Current rank: 1
- Highest rank: 1
Medal record
Representing Singapore
Men's Nine-ball
Southeast Asian Games
Gold medal – first place	2017 Malaysia	Doubles
Silver medal – second place	2019 Philippines	Doubles
Bronze medal – third place	2023 Cambodia	Singles
Bronze medal – third place	2015 Singapore	Doubles
Bronze medal – third place	2019 Philippines	Singles
Bronze medal – third place	2021 Vietnam	Singles
World Games
Bronze medal – third place	2022 Birmingham	Singles
Men's Ten-ball
Southeast Asian Games
Bronze medal – third place	2019 Philippines	Singles
Bronze medal – third place	2021 Vietnam	Singles

Aloysius Yapp (/ˌæloʊˈɪʃəs/; Chinese: 叶浚惟; pinyin: Yè Jùnwéi; born 2 May 1996) is a Singaporean professional pool player. He was the world junior champion in nine-ball in 2014. In 2025, Yapp defeated Jonás Souto of Spain 13–1 in the final of the UK Open Pool Championship, claiming his first major open title.

== Career ==
Yapp began playing pool at age eight. An alumnus of Saint Patrick's School, he dropped out of school in 2011 to turn professional, although he eventually completed his GCE Ordinary Level examinations at Coleman College. Reportedly the first professional pool player from Singapore, he won the inaugural Asian Junior Pool Championship in 2014. Later that year, he became the first Singaporean to claim a world title in pool when he won the World Junior Pool Championships (Under-19) in Shanghai, China, beating Hsu Jui-an 11–10. In 2021, he claimed the Singapore National Snooker Championship, defeating defending champion Peter Gilchrist 4–2. In the quarter-finals of the 2021 WPA World Ten-ball Championship, Yapp defeated Jayson Shaw, which moved him up to 8th in the world rankings; he ultimately finished in third place.

In the 2021 U.S. Open Pool Championship, Yapp survived a scare against Wojciech Szewczyk in the third round of the winners bracket by winning 11–10 before scoring upsets in quick succession against defending champion Joshua Filler 11–4 in the fourth round of the winners bracket and Shane Van Boening 11–5 in the Last 16. He went on to defeat both Rodrigo Geronimo and Dennis Orcollo by a scoreline of 11–6 in the quarterfinals and semifinals respectively, before losing to Carlo Biado 8–13 in the final, concluding his best finish in a major tournament. The following week, he won the CueSports International (CSI) Michigan 10-Ball Open, defeating Roberto Gomez 4–0, 4–2 in the final. He successfully defended his Michigan Open title the following year, defeating Robbie Capito 4–2, 4–1 in the final. The following month, he beat Chang Jung-Lin 7–6 in the final of the Sandcastle 9-Ball Open.

In 2022, he won a bronze medal at the 2022 World Games in Birmingham, Alabama for nine-ball.

On 18 October 2024, team Asia competed in the inaugural Reyes Cup at the Ninoy Aquino Stadium in Manila, Philippines. Johann Chua, Carlo Biado, Aloysius Yapp, Duong Quoc Hoang, and Ko Pin Yi made up the team, which was coached by the tournament namesake Efren Reyes. They defeated the European team 11–6. Team Europe is made up of Jayson Shaw, Eklent Kaci, Francisco Sanchez Ruiz, David Alcaide, and Mickey Krause. Yapp was named the first-ever Reyes Cup most valuable player for his performances throughout the event.

A month later, Yapp successfully defended his title by winning back-to-back championships at the International Open Nine-ball in Florida. He defeated Moritz Neuhausen of Germany, 13–6, and received $40,000 in prize money.

In May 2025, Yapp won his first matchroom major open title, defeating Jonás Souto of Spain with a 13–1 victory in the final of the UK Open Pool Championship at Telford International Centre. This win propelled him from fifth to second place in the matchroom world rankings, trailing Fedor Gorst at the top. Yapp's victory has also solidified his position in the Reyes Cup rosters, securing a spot to represent Team Asia this year. In August, Yapp won the inaugural Florida Open beating Shane Van Boening in the finals and a week later he won the US Open Nine-ball Championship against defending champion Fedor Gorst and becoming the first pool player to win three consecutive World Nine-ball Tour (WNT) Open Majors (UK Open, Florida Open, US Open).

== Titles & Achievements ==
- 2026 WPA World Eight-ball Championship
- 2025 AZBilliards Player of the Year
- 2025 International Open Nine-ball
- 2025 International Bigfoot Ten-ball Challenge
- 2025 Reyes Cup
- 2025 Formosa Cup Taipei Open Nine-ball Championship
- 2025 US Open Nine-ball Championship
- 2025 Florida Open Nine-ball Championship
- 2025 UK Open Nine-ball Championship
- 2025 National Nine-ball Open Championship
- 2024 International Open Nine-ball
- 2024 Reyes Cup (MVP)
- 2024 Reyes Cup
- 2024 Batam Open Ten-ball Championship
- 2023 International Open Nine-ball
- 2023 Battle of the Bull Nine-ball
- 2022 Meucci Classic Ten-ball
- 2022 Meucci Classic Nine-ball
- 2022 Predator Michigan Open Ten-ball
- 2022 Sandcastle Nine-ball Open
- 2021 Predator Michigan Open Ten-ball
- 2017 Southeast Asian Games Nine-ball Doubles
- 2017 Golden Break Nine-ball Open
- 2014 WPA World Nine-ball Junior championship
