= Robbie Capito =

Hong Kong pool player

Personal information
- Nickname: "The Sniper"
- Born: 19 June 2001 (age 25)

Pool career
- Country: Hong Kong
- Pool games: 8-ball, 9-ball, 10-ball

Tournament wins
- Major: UK Open Nine-ball Championship (2024)
- Current rank: 24
- Highest rank: 33

Robbie James Joaquin Capito (born 19 June 2001) is a Hong Kong-born Filipino professional pool player. He is most known for defeating the reigning world number one pool player Eklent Kaçi at the 2018 WPA World Nine-ball Championship when he was 17 years old. In 2024, Capito claimed his biggest career win after he defeated Mieszko Fortunski 13–10 to win the UK Open Nine-ball Championship.

== Career ==
In 2017, he was voted Hong Kong's Most Outstanding Junior Athletes of 2017, having won gold at the Asian Pool Championships, and a silver in the boys' under–17 category at the Junior World 9-ball Championships . The following year Capito finished as runner-up in the U19s final. He then snapped off both the singles and doubles event at the 2019 Asian Pool Championships U19.

In 2018, Capito reached the last 16 of the 2018 WPA World Nine-ball Championship, after defeating world number one Eklent Kaçi in the last 32, 11–10, when he was 17 years old. Capito defeated Kaçi after falling behind 7–1 earlier in the match. He lost in the next round to Joshua Filler.

In 2024, Capito won his first major title of his career as he defeated Mieszko Fortuński 13–10 to win the U.K. Open Nine-Ball Championship at the Telford International Centre, United Kingdom.

== Personal life ==
Capito was born on 19 June 2001 in Hong Kong. His parents are both natives of the Philippines. He says that he started playing pool aged two years old, after buying a mini pool table from Toys "R" Us, and would later play in his first pool room aged five.

== Titles and achievements ==
- 2025 Zan Tip Invitational Nine-ball
- 2024 UK Open Nine-ball Championship
