= Ko Pin-yi =

Taiwanese pool player (born 1989)

Personal information
- Nickname: "Prince of Pool"
- Born: 31 May 1989 (age 37)

Pool career
- Country: Chinese Taipei
- Turned pro: 2005
- Pool games: Nine-ball, Ten-ball

Tournament wins
- Major: World Cup of Pool, (2015)
- World Champion: Nine-ball (2015), Ten-ball (2015)
- Current rank: 85
- Highest rank: 1

Ko Pin-yi (born 31 May 1989) is a Taiwanese professional pool player. He became multiple World Champion in the disciplines of Nine-ball and Ten-ball in 2015.

== Career ==
Ko won the World Nine-ball Junior Championship twice in his junior career, in 2007 and 2008.

Ko became a multiple world champion in 2015, winning three world titles in a single calendar year. He defeated Carlo Biado 11–9 in the final of the 2015 WPA World Ten-ball Championship, followed by beating Shane Van Boening, 13–11 in the 2015 WPA World Nine-ball Championship final, Ko also captured its country's first World Cup of Pool title alongside Chang Yu-lung, defeating England B of Mark Gray and Daryl Peach 10–8 in the final. Ko was named Billiard Digest's "Player of the Year" in 2015.

In 2022, Ko won the Asian Pool Federation's Asian Nine-ball Open in Singapore, defeating James Aranas of the Philippines 13–11 in the final. He successfully defended it the following year, winning 13–6 over 16-year-old Filipino Albert James Manas.

In 2023, Ko became the first Taiwanese player to win the World Pool Masters title in Brentwood, Essex England with 13–5 win against Albania's Eklent Kaci.

In 2024, team Asia competed in the inaugural Reyes Cup at the Ninoy Aquino Stadium in Manila, Philippines. The team consisted of Johann Chua, Carlo Biado, Ko Pin Yi, Duong Quoc Hoang, and Aloysius Yapp, and was coached by the tournament namesake Efren Reyes. They defeated the European team 11–6. Team Europe was made up of Jayson Shaw, Eklent Kaçi, Francisco Sánchez Ruiz, David Alcaide, and Mickey Krause.

== Personal life ==
Pin Yi is the oldest of three brothers. His younger brothers, Ko Ping-chung and Ko Ping Han, are also professional pool players.

== Career titles and achievements ==
- 2026 Duya Legends Golden Nine Masters
- 2026 Chinese Taipei Open 9-Ball Championship
- 2026 CTPBA Pro Tour Grand Finals
- 2025 CTPBA Pro Nine-ball Tour II
- 2024 Shanghai Zen and Yuan8 Nine-ball
- 2024 CPBA Nine-ball Pro Open
- 2024 Reyes Cup
- 2024 Rasson Lushan Nine-ball Open
- 2023 APF Asian Nine-ball Open
- 2023 World Pool Masters
- 2022 APF Asian Nine-ball Open
- 2022 Predator Bucharest Open
- 2018 China Open Nine-ball Championship
- 2017 CBSA Pengzhou Nine-ball Open
- 2016 All Japan Championship Ten-ball
- 2015 Billiards Digest Player of the Year
- 2015 WPA World Ten-ball Championship
- 2015 World Cup of Pool – with (Chang Yu-lung)
- 2015 WPA World Nine-ball Championship
- 2014 CSI U.S. Open Ten-ball Championship
- 2013 Asian Indoor and Martial Arts Games Nine-ball Singles
- 2013 All Japan Championship Ten-ball
- 2012 Golden Break Nine-ball Open
- 2012 World Team Championship
- 2011 All Japan Championship Ten-ball
- 2011 Guinness Series of Pool Ten-ball
- 2010 Asia vs Europe Challenge Match
- 2009 Hokuriku Nine-ball Open
- 2008 Hokuriku Nine-ball Open
- 2008 Bangkok Brunswick Open
- 2008 WPA World Nine-ball Junior championship
- 2007 WPA World Nine-ball Junior championship
