= Fedor Gorst =

American pool player (born 2000)

Personal information
- Nickname: "The Ghost"
- Born: 31 May 2000 (age 26) Moscow, Russia
- Website: fedorgorst.com

Pool career
- Turned pro: 2015
- Pool games: Nine-ball, ten-ball, eight-ball, one pocket, banks

Tournament wins
- World Champion: Nine-ball (2019, 2024)

Fedor (Fyodor) Alekseyevich Gorst (Russian: Фёдор Алексеевич Горст, Russian pronunciation: ['fʲodɐr ɐlʲɪk'sʲejɪvʲɪtɕ ɡorst]; born May 31, 2000, in Moscow) is a Russian American professional pool player. He has become a US resident, and now represents the United States in international events such as Mosconi Cup.

== Career ==
In December 2018, Gorst reached 8th in the World Pool-Billiard Association (WPA) world rankings. Gorst won the U19 8-Ball European Pool Championship in 2017, before winning the 2018 Treviso Open on the Euro Tour. Gorst is also a Junior 9-ball world champion, winning the 2017 WPA World Nine-ball Junior Championship in the boys (Under 19) event.

Gorst won the 2019 WPA World Nine-ball Championship, defeating Chang Jung-lin in the final 13–11.

In 2023, Gorst made it to the final of the U.S. Open Nine-ball Championship, but he was defeated 13–6 by Taiwan's Ko Ping Chung.

In 2024, Gorst won his first major Matchroom title, defeating Joshua Filler in the final of the World Pool Masters 13‍–‍12. Later the same year, Gorst made it to the final of the 2024 WPA World Nine-ball Championship and went on to win 15–14 against Eklent Kaçi, winning his second major Matchroom title and becoming at 24 years old the youngest player to win the event more than once, following his previous victory in 2019. Additionally, Fedor would go on to win the U.S. Open 9-Ball Championship in August of that same year, beating Shane Van Boening 13–10 in the final. In doing so, he became the first player to win the WPA World Nine-ball Championship, U.S. Open 9-Ball Championship and the World Pool Masters title in the same year.

In 2025, Gorst advanced to his second WPA World Nine-ball Championship final in a row but proceeded to lose 15–13 to Carlo Biado.

== Titles and achievements ==
- 2026 Reyes Cup
- 2026 China Open 9-ball Championship
- 2026 Bayou State Classic One Pocket
- 2026 Bank Pool Master Showdown
- 2026 U.S. Open Eight-ball Championship
- 2026 Texas Open Ten-ball Championship
- 2026 Texas Open One Pocket Championship
- 2026 Derby City Classic Bigfoot Ten-ball Challenge
- 2025 Battle of the Bull One Pocket
- 2025 Derby City Classic Master of the Table
- 2025 Derby City Classic One Pocket
- 2025 Derby City Classic Bank Pool
- 2024 Billiards Digest Player of the Year
- 2024 Buffalos Pro-Am Classic Nine-ball
- 2024 U.S. Open 9-Ball Championship
- 2024 WPA World Nine-ball Championship
- 2024 World Pool Masters
- 2024 Rally in Shenandoah Valley Nine-ball Open
- 2024 Bayou State Classic One ball One Pocket
- 2024 Derby City Classic One Pocket
- 2024 Mini Derb Open One Pocket
- 2024 Turning Stone Classic
- 2023 Peri Nine-ball Open
- 2023 Turning Stone Classic
- 2023 CSI U.S. Open 8-Ball Championship
- 2023 CSI U.S. Open 10-Ball Championship
- 2023 Skinny Bob's One Pocket Classic
- 2023 Skinny Bob's Nine-ball Classic
- 2023 Derby City Classic Master of the Table
- 2023 Derby City Classic Nine-ball
- 2023 Derby City Classic Bank Pool
- 2023 Mini Derb Open Ten-ball
- 2023 Mini Derb Open Nine-ball
- 2023 Mini Derb Open One Pocket
- 2022 Predator Ohio Open 10-Ball
- 2022 River City Open Ten-ball Championship
- 2022 Brendan Crockett Memorial
- 2022 Racks on the Rocks One Pocket
- 2022 Racks on the Rocks Ten-ball
- 2022 International Bigfoot Ten-ball Challenge
- 2022 Predator Arizona Open 10-Ball
- 2022 CSI U.S. Open 10-Ball Championship
- 2022 Hannah Choi Memorial Ten-ball
- 2022 Junior Norris Memorial Shoot Out All Round Player
- 2022 Junior Norris Memorial Shoot Out Nine Ball
- 2022 Junior Norris Memorial Shoot Out Ten Ball
- 2022 Midwest Bar Table Classic
- 2022 Midwest Open Ten-ball Championship
- 2022 Midwest Ten-ball Invitational
- 2022 Derby City Classic Master of the Table
- 2022 Derby City Classic Bank Pool
- 2022 Derby City Classic One Pocket
- 2021 Predator Arizona Open 10-Ball
- 2021 Rack N Grill Nine-ball Shootout
- 2021 Midwest Ten-ball Invitational
- 2021 Russian Pool Championship Ten-ball
- 2021 Russian Pool Championship Eight-ball
- 2021 European Pool Championship 14.1
- 2020 Mosconi Cup
- 2020 Russian Pool Championship Ten-ball
- 2020 Russian Pool Championship Nine-ball
- 2020 Russian Pool Championship Eight-ball
- 2020 Athens Nine-ball Open
- 2019 WPA World Nine-ball Championship
- 2019 Russian Pool Championship Ten-ball
- 2019 Russian Pool Championship Nine-ball
- 2019 Mezz Bucharest Open
- 2019 European Pool Championship Nine-ball
- 2018 Russian Pool Championship Ten-ball
- 2018 Euro Tour Treviso Open
- 2017 Russian Pool Championship 14.1
- 2017 WPA World Nine-ball Junior championship
