= Francisco Sánchez Ruiz =

Spanish pool player (born 1991)

Personal information
- Nicknames: "The Ferrari", "FSR"
- Born: 29 December 1991 (age 34) Murcia, Spain

Pool career
- Country: Spain
- Turned pro: 2010
- Pool games: Nine-ball, eight-ball

Tournament wins
- Major: U.S. Open (2022, 2026)
- World Champion: Eight-ball (2022), Nine-ball (2023)
- Current rank: 8
- Highest rank: 1

Francisco Sánchez Ruiz (born December 29, 1991) is a Spanish professional pool player, nicknamed "The Ferrari" and by his initials "FSR". He won both the 2022 WPA World Eight-ball Championship and the 2023 WPA World Nine-ball Championship.

== Career ==
Sánchez Ruiz won the World Nine-ball Junior Championship in 2010, defeating Jesse Engel 11–6 in the final.

In 2016, Sánchez Ruiz won the 2016 European Pool Championship in nine-ball defeating Joshua Filler in the final, 9–3. He also reached the final of the eight-ball event, but lost 7–8 to Vitaly Pazura.

Sánchez Ruiz was the runner-up at the 2017 Austrian Open, defeated in the final 9–2 by Mario He.

In 2022, Sánchez Ruiz alongside David Alcaide won the World Cup of Pool, defeating Aloysius Yapp and Toh Lian Han of Singapore 11–6 the final. He then won the U.S. Open Nine-ball Championship defeating Max Lechner in the final 13–10. Sánchez Ruiz won his first world title at the 2022 WPA World Eight-ball Championship after defeating Wiktor Zieliński 10–6 in the final at the Puerto Rico Convention Center, San Juan. Sánchez Ruiz was named Billiard Digest Player of the year in 2022.

In 2023, Sánchez Ruiz won his second world title at the World Nine-ball Championship after defeating Mohammad Soufi 13–10 in the final held in Kielce, Poland.

In 2024, Sánchez Ruiz won the 2024 European Pool Championship in eight-ball defeating Mario He in the final, 8-6 Later in 2024, Sánchez Ruiz was part of the European team that were defeated by Asia in the inaugural Reyes Cup which was held in Manila.

== Titles and achievements ==
- 2026 Reyes Cup MVP
- 2026 Reyes Cup
- 2026 Men's Doubles Ten-ball World Championship
- 2026 U.S. Open Nine-ball Championship
- 2025 Little Monster Men's International Ten-ball Open
- 2024 Mosconi Cup
- 2024 Peri Nine-ball Open
- 2024 European Pool Championship Eight-ball
- 2024 FSR Nine-ball Open
- 2023 Mosconi Cup
- 2023 Premier League Pool
- 2023 WPA World Nine-ball Championship
- 2022 AZBilliards Player of the Year
- 2022 Mosconi Cup
- 2022 Euro Tour Petrich Open
- 2022 WPA World Eight-ball Championship
- 2022 U.S. Open Nine-ball Championship
- 2022 PRP Nine-Ball Open
- 2022 World Cup of Pool - with (David Alcaide)
- 2022 Derby City Classic Nine-ball
- 2021 Euro Tour Lasko Open
- 2021 Euro Tour Antalya Open
- 2019 Spanish Amateur Snooker Championship
- 2018 Spanish Amateur Snooker Championship
- 2017 World Pool Series Cheqio Challenge
- 2016 European Pool Championship Nine-ball
- 2015 Spanish Pool Championship Ten-ball
- 2015 Spanish Pool Championship Nine-ball
- 2015 Spanish Pool Championship Eight-ball
- 2014 Spanish Pool Championship Nine-ball
- 2014 Spanish Pool Championship Eight-ball
- 2013 Spanish Pool Championship Nine-ball
- 2012 Spanish Pool Championship Eight-ball
- 2010 WPA World Nine-ball Junior Championship
- 2008 Spanish Pool Championship Eight-ball
- 2007 Spanish Pool Championship Nine-ball
