= 2019 Antalya Open (pool) =

Professional pool competition, held November 2019

Tournament information
- Dates: 7–10 November 2019
- Venue: Limak Atlantis Resort
- City: Antalya
- Country: Turkey
- Organisation(s): Euro Tour, World Pool-Billiard Association
- Format: Double-elimination, Single-elimination

Final
- Champion: Denis Grabe (EST) (m); Oliwia Zalewska (POL) (f)
- Runner-up: Eklent Kaçi (ALB) (m); Tina Vogelmann (GER) (f)
- Score: 9–2 (m) / 7–6 (f)

The 2019 Antalya Open (also known as the 2019 Dynamic Billiard Antalya Open) was a professional nine-ball pool tournament held from 7 to 10 November 2019 in the Limak Atlantis Resort in Antalya, Turkey. The event was the sixth and final Euro Tour event of 2019, following the Klagenfurt Open. The men's event was won by Estonia's Denis Grabe, who won his third Tour win, defeating Eklent Kaçi 9–2. The women's event was won by Poland's Oliwia Zalewska, who won her first Tour event. She defeated Tina Vogelmann in the final 7–6.

== Tournament format ==
The 2019 Antalya Open was a professional nine-ball event, the sixth and final Euro Tour event held in 2019. The event featured two brackets, held from 7 to 9 November 2019 for the men's event, and 8 to 10 November for the women's event. Both events were first played as a double-elimination tournament. It was held at the Limak Atlantis Resort in Antalya, Turkey. The men's event became a single-elimination bracket at the round-of-32, while the women's event remained a double-elimination tournament until the round-of-16. All matches were played as race-to-nine racks.

The tournament was the first Euro Tour event held in Turkey since the 1999 Turkish Open won by Germany's Ralph Eckert.

=== Prize fund ===
Both the men's and women's event's prize fund was similar to those of other Euro Tour events, totalling €38,000, of which €4,500 was awarded to both of the winners of the event.

Place	Prize money
Winner	€4,500
Finalist	€3,000
Semi-finalist	€1,750
Quarter-finalist	€1,250
Last 16	€1,000
Last 32	€600
33–48	€275
Total	€38,000

== Tournament summary ==
=== Men's event ===
The men's event was held from 7–9 November 2019 with 181 participants. The double-elimination stage featured nine rounds. Nick Malai defeated former winner Ruslan Chinakhov 9–1 in the opening round, however, both players won their remaining matches and reached the single-elimination round. British players Mark Gray and Darren Appleton also met in the first round; the 2012 WPA World Nine-ball Championship winner Appleton won 9–5. Gray commented post-match that his break was to blame, and that the "better player undoubtedly won". Having won, Appleton qualified for the winner's third round, but decided to sleep prior to the match. Instead of waking in time for his 4:30 pm GMT match with Albin Ouschan, Appleton overslept, forfeited the match, and also his loser's qualification round match, scheduled to also be against Gray. Two several-time Euro Tour winners Mario He and Thorsten Hohmann met in the loser's qualification round. Hohmann led 6–3, before He won five of the next six racks to lead 8–7, however Hohmann won the next two frames to eliminate He.

The single-elimination round was played on the 8 and 9 November. Hohmann met fellow German player and reigning WPA World Nine-ball champion Joshua Filler. Filler outplayed Hohmann, and won 9–3. Mark Gray defeated Tomasz Kapłan 9–2 to meet Filler in the last 16, where Filler won 9–7. Francisco Sanchez-Ruiz defeated Albin Ouschan 9–2 in the last 32 before defeating Wiktor Zielinski 9–1 to reach the quarter-finals. At the quarter-final stage, Sanchez-Ruiz was defeated by Russian youngster Fedor Gorst 5–9. Elsewhere, Denis Grabe defeated Mieszko Fortunski 9–6, Eklent Kaçi defeated Sanjin Pehlivanovic 9–5 and David Alcaide defeated Joshua Filler 9–7. The first semi-final saw Kaci defeat Alcaide 9–4, whilst Grabe defeated Gorst 9–6.

The final was held at 5:30 pm GMT between Grabe and Kaci. Grabe was playing in his fourth Tour final, having won two prior events in 2014, whilst Kaci was playing in his fifth final, having won two prior events including the 2019 Austria Open prior in the season. With Grabe leading 4–1, Kaci missed a shot on the 2-ball and conceded the rack in frustration. Referee Nikola Pešo deemed the act as unsportsmanlike and awarded both rack six and an additional rack to Grabe. Leading 6–1, Grabe won three of the next four racks to win the tournament.

=== Women's event ===
The women's event took place from 8 to 10 November, with 34 participants. The double-elimination round lasted six rounds. The top four ranked players on the Tour all reached the last 16. Russia's Kristina Tkach (first seed) won her matches 7–1 and 7–3 to draw Veronika Ivanovskaia in the knockout round. Tkach won the match 7–6 to reach the quarter-finals. Belarusian player Marharyta Fefilava (second seed) won her two qualifying matches 7–0 and 7–2 to meet Kamila Khodjaeva in the last 16. Fefilava defeated Khodjaeva 7–4 to reach the quarter-finals. Both Ana Gradišnik (third seed) and Kateryna Polovinchuk (fourth seed) also reached the last 16 round, but lost to Christine Steinlage and Oliwia Zalewska respectively.

The quarter-finals started with Tkach defeating Pia Filler 7–4, whilst Zalewska defeated Melanie Suessenguth 7–4. The bottom half of the draw featured Steinlage defeating Diana Stateczny 7–3, and Tina Vogelmann defeating Fefilava 7–4. In the semi-finals, Zalewska defeated Tkach 7–5, whilst Vogelmann defeated Steinlage 7–3. The final was played between Tina Vogelmann and Oliwia Zalewska. Vogelmann was playing in her first Euro Tour final, whereas Zalewska had won three events prior, including the preceding event, the Klagenfurt Open. Vogelmann took an early lead in the match, leading 4–2 after six racks. Zalewska won the next three racks to lead, but the match became tied at 6–6. Vogelmann broke for the match, but had a dry break. Zaleska chose to push out, but Vogelmann left the table safe after her shot. With no clear shot, Zaleska fluked both the 1-ball and 2-ball, and ran the rack to win the match and tournament.

== Results ==
=== Men's competition ===
Below is the results from the round of 32 (Last 32) onward with positions were determined by performance in the double-elimination round. Players in bold denote match winners:

1st Round
**Joshua Filler (GER)**	9
Thorsten Hohmann (GER)	3
**Mark Gray (GBR)**	9
Tomasz Kapłan (POL)	2
Nick Malai (GRE)	5
**David Alcaide (ESP)**	9
Wojciech Sroczynski (POL)	5
**Niels Feijen (NED)**	9
**Eklent Kaçi (ALB)**	9
Nikos Ekonomopoulos (GRE)	3
**Aleksa Pecelj (SER)**	9
Maksim Dudanets (RUS)	1
**Ralf Souquet (GER)**	9
Dimitris Loukatos (GRE)	8
**Sanjin Pehlivanovic (BIH)**	9
Jani Siekkinen (FIN)	4
**Denis Grabe (EST)**	9
Mariusz Skoneczny (POL)	6
Ruslan Chinakhov (RUS)	8
**Olivér Szolnoki (HUN)**	9
**Mieszko Fortunski (POL)**	9
Andrey Seroshtan (RUS)	7
Imran Majid (GBR)	6
**Alexander Kazakis (GRE)**	9
Albin Ouschan (AUT)	2
**Francisco Sanchez-Ruiz (ESP)**	9
Tim De Ruyter (NED)	5
**Wiktor Zielinski (POL)**	9
**Konrad Juszczyszyn (POL)**	9
Daniel Macioł (POL)	5
**Fedor Gorst (RUS)**	9
Sergey Lutsker (RUS)	5

2nd Round
(Germany) **Joshua Filler**	9
(United Kingdom) Mark Gray	7
(Spain) **David Alcaide**	9
(Netherlands) Niels Feijen	8
(Albania) **Eklent Kaçi**	9
(Serbia) Aleksa Pecelj	2
(Germany) Ralf Souquet	7
(Bosnia and Herzegovina) **Sanjin Pehlivanovic**	9
(Estonia) **Denis Grabe**	9
(Hungary) Olivér Szolnoki	5
(Poland) **Mieszko Fortunski**	9
(Greece) Alexander Kazakis	3
(Spain) **Francisco Sanchez-Ruiz**	9
(Poland) Wiktor Zielinski	1
(Poland) Konrad Juszczyszyn	1
(Russia) **Fedor Gorst**	9

Quarterfinals
(Germany) Joshua Filler	7
(Spain) **David Alcaide**	9
(Albania) **Eklent Kaçi**	9
(Bosnia and Herzegovina) Sanjin Pehlivanovic	5
(Estonia) **Denis Grabe**	9
(Poland) Mieszko Fortunski	6
(Spain) Francisco Sanchez-Ruiz	5
(Russia) **Fedor Gorst**	9

Semifinals
(Spain) David Alcaide	4
(Albania) **Eklent Kaçi**	9
(Estonia) **Denis Grabe**	9
(Russia) Fedor Gorst	6

Finals
(Albania) Eklent Kaçi	2
(Estonia) **Denis Grabe**	9

=== Women's event ===
The following results are from the knockout stages following the round of 16. Players in bold denote match winners:

Last 16; Race to seven racks
**Kristina Tkach (RUS)**	7
Veronika Ivanovskaia (GER)	6
**Pia Filler (GER)**	7
Veronika Hubrtová (CZE)	4
**Melanie Suessenguth (GER)**	7
Ine Helvik (NOR)	1
Kateryna Polovinchuk (UKR)	5
**Oliwia Zalewska (POL)**	7
Ana Gradišnik (SLO)	6
**Christine Steinlage (GER)**	7
**Diana Stateczny (GER)**	7
Ina Kaplan (GER)	5
**Tina Vogelmann (GER)**	7
Tamara Peeters (NED)	6
**Marharyta Fefilava (BLR)**	7
Kamila Khodjaeva (BEL)	4

Quarter-finals; Race to seven racks
(Russia) **Kristina Tkach**	7
(Germany) Pia Filler	4
(Germany) Melanie Suessenguth	4
(Poland) **Oliwia Zalewska**	7
(Germany) **Christine Steinlage**	7
(Germany) Diana Stateczny	3
(Germany) **Tina Vogelmann**	7
(Belarus) Marharyta Fefilava	4

Semi-finals; Race to seven racks
(Russia) Kristina Tkach	5
(Poland) **Oliwia Zalewska**	7
(Germany) Christine Steinlage	3
(Germany) **Tina Vogelmann**	7

Final; Race to seven racks
(Poland) **Oliwia Zalewska**	7
(Germany) Tina Vogelmann	6
