= 2018 European Pool Championship =

European Pool Championships, July 2018

Tournament information
- Dates: July 19–July 31, 2018
- Venue: NH Hotel Koningshof
- City: Veldhoven
- Country: Netherlands
- Organisation: European Pool Championships

Champions

Straight pool
- Men's: (Netherlands) Niels Feijen
- Women's: (Austria) Jasmin Ouschan

8-Ball
- Men's: (Denmark) Bahram Lotfy
- Women's: (Germany) Veronika Ivanovskaia
- Wheelchair: (Finland) Jouni Tähti

9-Ball
- Men's: (Poland) Konrad Juszczyszyn
- Women's: (United Kingdom) Kelly Fisher
- Wheelchair: (Finland) Jouni Tähti

10-Ball
- Men's: (Germany) Joshua Filler
- Women's: (Belarus) Jana Schut
- Wheelchair: (Finland) Jouni Tähti

The 2018 European Pool Championships was a professional pool championship that took place at the NH Hotel Koningshof, in Veldhoven, Netherlands. The event played between 19 and 31 July 2018 was a part of the European Pool Championships; and saw events for men, women, wheelchair competitors, youth and seniors across four pool disciplines: Straight Pool, 8-Ball, 9-Ball, and 10-Ball.

The event was the largest pool event ever held in Europe, with sixty tables built exclusively for the event.

== Tournament overview ==
The European Championship 2018 was held at the NH Hotel Koningshof in Veldhoven, Netherlands. In a hall of the hotel 60 pool tables were built. Veldhoven held the event for the second time, having hosted it in 2005. The event hosted over 550 players from 37 countries, the most of any European championships.

All competitions were played in the double elimination knockout system until only a certain number of participants remained and then continued in the knockout system. The individual competitions of the men were played in the round of the last 64 in knockout mode (straight pool: round of the last 32), in the women from the round of 16, and the wheelchair users from the quarter-finals. The team competitions were held from the round of 16 (men) or semi-final (ladies) in the knockout system.

The online news channel Kozoom streamed all matches of the European Championship live in up to 60 channels.

== Results ==
Jouni Tähti was the most successful player at the championships, becoming the first wheelchair player to win all three disciplines in a single championships. The following is a list of winners to semi-finalists for all events through the championships.

Discipline	Winner	Runner-up	Semi-finalists
Men's straight pool	(Netherlands) Niels Feijen	(Austria) Albin Ouschan	(Poland) Mariusz Skoneczny
Men's straight pool	(Netherlands) Niels Feijen	(Austria) Albin Ouschan	(Russia) Konstantin Stepanov
Men's 10-ball	(Germany) Joshua Filler	(Austria) Albin Ouschan	(Russia) Ruslan Tschinachow
Men's 10-ball	(Germany) Joshua Filler	(Austria) Albin Ouschan	(Poland) Karol Skowerski
Men's 8-Ball	(Denmark) Bahram Lotfy	(Poland) Konrad Juszczyszyn	(Poland) Mieszko Fortuński
Men's 8-Ball	(Denmark) Bahram Lotfy	(Poland) Konrad Juszczyszyn	(Germany) Joshua Filler
Men's 9-ball	(Poland) Konrad Juszczyszyn	(Bulgaria) Stanimir Ruslanow	(Germany) Joshua Filler
Men's 9-ball	(Poland) Konrad Juszczyszyn	(Bulgaria) Stanimir Ruslanow	(Spain) Francisco Díaz-Pizarro
Men's Team	Poland	Netherlands	Croatia
Men's Team	Poland	Netherlands	Estonia
Women's Straight Pool	(Austria) Jasmin Ouschan	(Russia) Kristina Tkatsch	(Ukraine) Kateryna Polovinchuk
Women's Straight Pool	(Austria) Jasmin Ouschan	(Russia) Kristina Tkatsch	(Switzerland) Christine Feldmann
Women's 10-Ball	(Belarus) Jana Schut	(Austria) Jasmin Ouschan	(Poland) Oliwia Zalewska
Women's 10-Ball	(Belarus) Jana Schut	(Austria) Jasmin Ouschan	(Norway) Line Kjørsvik
Women's 8-Ball	(Germany) Veronika Ivanovskaia	(Netherlands) Tamara Peeters	(Austria) Jasmin Ouschan
Women's 8-Ball	(Germany) Veronika Ivanovskaia	(Netherlands) Tamara Peeters	(Germany) Vivien-Kathy Schade
Women's 9-Ball	(United Kingdom) Kelly Fisher	(Austria) Jasmin Ouschan	(Portugal) Sara Rocha
Women's 9-Ball	(United Kingdom) Kelly Fisher	(Austria) Jasmin Ouschan	(Czech Republic) Veronika Hubrtová
Women's Team	Portugal	Ukraine	Netherlands
Women's Team	Portugal	Ukraine	Russia
Wheelchair 10-Ball	(Finland) Jouni Tähti	(United Kingdom) Roy Kimberley	(United Kingdom) Tony Southern
Wheelchair 10-Ball	(Finland) Jouni Tähti	(United Kingdom) Roy Kimberley	(Republic of Ireland) Fred Dinsmore
Wheelchair 8-Ball	(Finland) Jouni Tähti	(Sweden) Henrik Larsson	(Belgium) Kurt Deklerck
Wheelchair 8-Ball	(Finland) Jouni Tähti	(Sweden) Henrik Larsson	(Slovenia) Matej Brajkovic
Wheelchair 9-Ball	(Finland) Jouni Tähti	(Republic of Ireland) Fred Dinsmore	(United Kingdom) Tony Southern
Wheelchair 9-Ball	(Finland) Jouni Tähti	(Republic of Ireland) Fred Dinsmore	(Slovenia) Matej Brajkovic

== Men's ==
=== Straight Pool ===
Round of 32
1	(Slovakia) Jaroslav Polach	82
32	(Finland) Jani Siekkinen	100
17	(Luxembourg) Marc Glatz	8
16	(Lithuania) Pijus Labutis	100
9	(France) Stephan Cohen	100
24	(Netherlands) Marc Bijsterbosch	49
25	(Slovenia) Mitja Gradišnik	6
8	(Austria) Albin Ouschan	100
5	(Austria) Georg Höberl	71
28	(Russia) Konstantin Stepanov	100
21	(Portugal) Joao Grilo	17
12	(Sweden) Marcus Chamat	100
13	(Austria) Mario He	100
20	(Germany) Sebastian Staab	0
29	(Portugal) Miguel Silva	100
4	(Finland) Kim Laaksonen	92
3	(Poland) Mieszko Fortuński	100
30	(Germany) Stefan Nölle	82
19	(Ukraine) Vitaliy Patsura	88
14	(Poland) Mariusz Skoneczny	100
11	(Austria) Maximilian Lechner	100
22	(Russia) Andrei Seroschtan	64
27	(Italy) Michele Bianchini	12
6	(France) Alex Montpellier	100
7	(Finland) Jani Uski	65
26	(Finland) Petri Makkonen	100
23	(Spain) Francisco Sánchez	100
10	(Czech Republic) Roman Hybler	88
15	(Croatia) Roberto Bartol	100
18	(Slovakia) Balazs Koeles	55
31	(Netherlands) Niels Feijen	100
2	(Poland) Tomasz Kapłan	4

Round of 16
(Finland) Jani Siekkinen	12
(Lithuania) Pijus Labutis	100
(France) Stephan Cohen	9
(Austria) Albin Ouschan	100
(Russia) Konstantin Stepanov	100
(Sweden) Marcus Chamat	36
(Austria) Mario He	100
(Portugal) Miguel Silva	40
(Poland) Mieszko Fortuński	70
(Poland) Mariusz Skoneczny	100
(Austria) Maximilian Lechner	100
(France) Alex Montpellier	19
(Finland) Petri Makkonen	97
(Spain) Francisco Sánchez	100
(Croatia) Roberto Bartol	36
(Netherlands) Niels Feijen	100

Quarter-final
(Lithuania) Pijus Labutis	99
(Austria) Albin Ouschan	125
(Russia) Konstantin Stepanov	125
(Austria) Mario He	38
(Poland) Mariusz Skoneczny	125
(Austria) Maximilian Lechner	103
(Spain) Francisco Sánchez	83
(Netherlands) Niels Feijen	125

Semi-final
(Austria) Albin Ouschan	125
(Russia) Konstantin Stepanov	94
(Poland) Mariusz Skoneczny	28
(Netherlands) Niels Feijen	125

Final
(Austria) Albin Ouschan	73
(Netherlands) Niels Feijen	125

=== 10-Ball ===
Round of 64
1	(Austria) Mario He	6
64	(Croatia) Roberto Bartol	8
33	(Poland) Tomasz Kapłan	8
32	(Poland) Mariusz Skoneczny	5
17	(Lithuania) Pijus Labutis	8
48	(Turkey) Onur Yildirim	4
49	(Spain) Francisco Díaz-Pizarro	8
16	(Slovakia) Jaroslav Polach	7
9	(Bulgaria) Stanimir Ruslanow	8
56	(Norway) Matias Sætre	7
41	(Germany) Ralf Souquet	7
24	(Poland) Mieszko Fortuński	8
25	(Germany) Joshua Filler	8
40	(Greece) Nick Malai	4
57	(Italy) Alessandro Torrenti	8
8	(Austria) Georg Höberl	3
5	(Croatia) Ante Sola	5
60	(Netherlands) Jan Rempe	8
37	(Slovakia) Jakub Koniar	8
28	(Finland) Jani Siekkinen	4
21	(Greece) Nikos Ekonomopoulos	4
44	(Norway) Mats Schjetne	8
53	(Finland) Kim Laaksonen	6
12	(Russia) Ruslan Tschinachow	8
13	(Denmark) Bahram Lotfy	8
52	(Estonia) Erki Erm	4
45	(Russia) Konstantin Stepanov	8
20	(Sweden) Lukas Andersson	5
29	(Sweden) Marcus Chamat	6
36	(Netherlands) Marc Bijsterbosch	8
61	(Spain) Francisco Sánchez	8
4	(Finland) Markus Juva	5
3	(Estonia) Denis Grabe	6
62	(Austria) Albin Ouschan	8
35	(France) Fabio Rizzi	3
30	(Serbia) Milos Verkic	8
19	(France) Alain Da Costa	8
46	(Luxembourg) Marc Glatz	3
51	(Portugal) Americo Ferreira	4
14	(Portugal) Miguel Silva	8
11	(Spain) Iker-Andoni Echevaria	8
54	(France) Stephan Cohen	5
43	(Germany) Sebastian Staab	8
22	(Bosnia and Herzegovina) Alen Muratović	6
27	(Bulgaria) Georgi Georgiew	8
38	(Italy) Michele Bianchini	7
59	(Netherlands) Niels Feijen	8
6	(Croatia) Tomislav Susic	2
7	(Austria) Maximilian Lechner	5
58	(Netherlands) Nick van den Berg	8
39	(Spain) David Alcaide	7
26	(Netherlands) Ivar Saris	8
23	(Greece) Alexander Kazakis	8
42	(Sweden) Adrian Weiss	3
55	(Poland) Karol Skowerski	8
10	(Slovakia) Lukas Kovac	7
15	(Russia) Fedor Gorst	8
50	(Czech Republic) Jan Meisner	4
47	(Portugal) Joao Grilo	8
18	(Slovakia) Daniel Lang	5
31	(Finland) Petri Makkonen	8
34	(Russia) Andrei Seroschtan	4
63	(Sweden) Christian Sparrenlöv	8
2	(Finland) Jani Uski	4

Round of 32
(Croatia) R. Bartol	7
(Poland) T. Kapłan	8
(Lithuania) P. Labutis	4
(Spain) F. Díaz-Pizarro	8
(Bulgaria) S. Ruslanow	4
(Poland) M. Fortuński	8
(Germany) J. Filler	8
(Italy) A. Torrenti	2
(Netherlands) J. Rempe	2
(Slovakia) J. Koniar	8
(Norway) M. Schjetne	2
(Russia) R. Tschinachow	8
(Denmark) B. Lotfy	5
(Russia) K. Stepanow	8
(Netherlands) M. Bijsterbosch	8
(Spain) F. Sánchez	3
(Austria) A. Ouschan	8
(Serbia) M. Verkic	1
(France) A. Da Costa	8
(Portugal) M. Silva	6
(Spain) I.-A. Echevaria	8
(Germany) S. Staab	7
(Bulgaria) G. Georgiew	7
(Netherlands) N. Feijen	8
(Netherlands) N. van den Berg	3
(Netherlands) I. Saris	8
(Greece) A. Kazakis	7
(Poland) K. Skowerski	8
(Russia) F. Gorst	8
(Portugal) J. Grilo	2
(Finland) P. Makkonen	8
(Sweden) C. Sparrenlöv	3

Round of 16
(Poland) T. Kapłan	8
(Spain) F. Díaz-Pizarro	7
(Poland) M. Fortuński	3
(Germany) J. Filler	8
(Slovakia) J. Koniar	2
(Russia) R. Tschinachow	8
(Russia) K. Stepanow	8
(Netherlands) M. Bijsterbosch	5
(Austria) A. Ouschan	8
(France) A. Da Costa	2
(Spain) I.-A. Echevaria	8
(Netherlands) N. Feijen	6
(Netherlands) I. Saris	6
(Poland) K. Skowerski	8
(Russia) F. Gorst	5
(Finland) P. Makkonen	8

Quarter-final
(Poland) T. Kapłan	5
(Germany) J. Filler	8
(Russia) R. Tschinachow	8
(Russia) K. Stepanow	7
(Austria) A. Ouschan	8
(Spain) I.-A. Echevaria	0
(Poland) K. Skowerski	8
(Finland) P. Makkonen	3

Semi-final
(Germany) J. Filler	8
(Russia) R. Tschinachow	0
(Austria) A. Ouschan	8
(Poland) K. Skowerski	7

Final
(Germany) J. Filler	8
(Austria) A. Ouschan	5

=== 8-Ball ===
Round of 64
1	(Finland) Jani Uski	8
64	(Portugal) Americo Ferreira	7
33	(Netherlands) Ivar Saris	8
32	(France) Fabio Rizzi	2
17	(Bosnia and Herzegovina) Alen Muratović	4
48	(Greece) Nikos Ekonomopoulos	8
49	(Germany) Joshua Filler	8
16	(Russia) Sergei Luzker	5
9	(Finland) Markus Juva	8
56	(Slovakia) Jaroslav Polach	4
41	(Sweden) Marcus Chamat	8
24	(Netherlands) Tim de Ruyter	3
25	(Germany) André Lackner	3
40	(Cyprus) Lefteris Georgiou	8
57	(Poland) Tomasz Kapłan	8
8	(Slovenia) Mitja Gradišnik	1
5	(Russia) Ruslan Tschinachow	8
60	(Czech Republic) Roman Hybler	4
37	(Austria) Maximilian Lechner	8
28	(Denmark) Andreas Madsen	2
21	(Serbia) Andreja Klasovic	8
44	(Finland) Petri Makkonen	4
53	(Poland) Konrad Juszczyszyn	8
12	(Sweden) Jesper Carlsson	5
13	(Russia) Andrei Seroschtan	8
52	(Germany) Christoph Reintjes	5
45	(Bulgaria) Stanimir Ruslanow	8
20	(Turkey) Erol Kayas	5
29	(Estonia) Denis Grabe	8
36	(Italy) Alessandro Torrenti	3
61	(Spain) Francisco Sánchez	7
4	(Slovakia) Jakub Koniar	8
3	(Austria) Mario He	8
62	(Sweden) Adrian Weiss	2
35	(Portugal) Bruno Sousa	8
30	(Poland) Karol Skowerski	6
19	(Sweden) Tomas Larsson	2
46	(Netherlands) Alex Lely	8
51	(Denmark) Bahram Lotfy	8
14	(Czech Republic) Petr Urban	0
11	(Netherlands) Niels Feijen	4
54	(Russia) Fedor Gorst	8
43	(Greece) Alexander Kazakis	8
22	(Germany) Sebastian Ludwig	4
27	(Poland) Mariusz Skoneczny	8
38	(Turkey) Ferdi Ozdemir	0
59	(Spain) Francisco Díaz-Pizarro	8
6	(Slovakia) Lukas Kovac	6
7	(Poland) Mieszko Fortuński	8
58	(Sweden) Senarip Azar	5
39	(Spain) David Alcaide	7
26	(Croatia) Michel Bartol	8
23	(Russia) Konstantin Stepanov	8
42	(Portugal) Miguel Silva	4
55	(Germany) Ralf Souquet	8
10	(Greece) Nick Malai	3
15	(Denmark) Kasper Kristoffersen	4
50	(Croatia) Roberto Bartol	8
47	(Austria) Albin Ouschan	4
18	(Bulgaria) Georgi Georgiew	8
31	(Portugal) Joao Grilo	8
34	(Cyprus) Panayiotis Petrou	4
63	(Netherlands) Marc Bijsterbosch	7
2	(France) Alex Montpellier	8

Round of 32
(Finland) J. Uski	6
(Netherlands) I. Saris	8
(Greece) N. Ekonomopoulos	6
(Germany) J. Filler	8
(Finland) M. Juva	8
(Sweden) M. Chamat	7
(Cyprus) L. Georgiou	6
(Poland) T. Kapłan	8
(Russia) R. Tschinachow	6
(Austria) M. Lechner	8
(Serbia) A. Klasovic	3
(Poland) K. Juszczyszyn	8
(Russia) A. Seroschtan	8
(Bulgaria) S. Ruslanow	6
(Estonia) D. Grabe	8
(Slovakia) J. Koniar	6
(Austria) M. He	8
(Portugal) B. Sousa	4
(Netherlands) A. Lely	7
(Denmark) B. Lotfy	8
(Russia) F. Gorst	4
(Greece) A. Kazakis	8
(Poland) M. Skoneczny	7
(Spain) F. Díaz-Pizarro	8
(Poland) M. Fortuński	8
(Croatia) M. Bartol	3
(Russia) K. Stepanow	7
(Germany) R. Souquet	8
(Croatia) R. Bartol	8
(Bulgaria) G. Georgiew	0
(Portugal) J. Grilo	6
(France) A. Montpellier	8

Round of 16
(Netherlands) I. Saris	3
(Germany) J. Filler	8
(Finland) M. Juva	8
(Poland) T. Kapłan	7
(Austria) M. Lechner	4
(Poland) K. Juszczyszyn	8
(Russia) A. Seroschtan	8
(Estonia) D. Grabe	6
(Austria) M. He	7
(Denmark) B. Lotfy	8
(Greece) A. Kazakis	8
(Spain) F. Díaz-Pizarro	3
(Poland) M. Fortuński	8
(Germany) R. Souquet	5
(Croatia) R. Bartol	3
(France) A. Montpellier	8

Quarter-final
(Germany) J. Filler	8
(Finland) M. Juva	3
(Poland) K. Juszczyszyn	8
(Russia) A. Seroschtan	4
(Denmark) B. Lotfy	8
(Greece) A. Kazakis	7
(Poland) M. Fortuński	8
(France) A. Montpellier	6

Semi-final
(Germany) J. Filler	6
(Poland) K. Juszczyszyn	8
(Denmark) B. Lotfy	8
(Poland) M. Fortuński	3

Final
(Poland) K. Juszczyszyn	2
(Denmark) B. Lotfy	8

=== 9-Ball ===
Round of 64
1	(Russia) Ruslan Tschinachow	6
64	(Turkey) Ferdi Ozdemir	9
33	(Romania) Babken Melkonyan	5
32	(Poland) Konrad Juszczyszyn	9
17	(Denmark) Andreas Madsen	9
48	(Portugal) Bruno Sousa	4
49	(Sweden) Tomas Larsson	1
16	(Netherlands) Alex Lely	9
9	(Estonia) Denis Grabe	9
56	(Russia) Konstantin Stepanov	7
41	(Austria) Albin Ouschan	9
24	(Poland) Mariusz Skoneczny	4
25	(Greece) Nikos Ekonomopoulos	9
40	(Czech Republic) Roman Hybler	5
57	(Finland) Markus Juva	8
8	(Denmark) Bahram Lotfy	9
5	(Russia) Andrei Seroschtan	6
60	(Switzerland) Dimitri Jungo	9
37	(Netherlands) Marc Bijsterbosch	9
28	(Greece) Alexander Kazakis	2
21	(Sweden) Marcus Chamat	9
44	(Turkey) Saki Kanatlar	8
53	(Spain) Francisco Sánchez	9
12	(Sweden) Christian Sparrenlöv	2
13	(Portugal) Joao Grilo	9
52	(Croatia) Tomislav Susic	7
45	(Bulgaria) Georgi Georgiew	9
20	(Russia) Sergei Luzker	4
29	(Netherlands) Jan Rempe	8
36	(Czech Republic) Marek Hajdovsky	9
61	(Netherlands) Niels Feijen	2
4	(Germany) Joshua Filler	9
3	(Finland) Jani Uski	5
62	(Spain) Iker-Andoni Echevaria	9
35	(Turkey) Mahmut-Sami Koylu	1
30	(Germany) Ralf Souquet	9
19	(Finland) Petri Makkonen	4
46	(Finland) Jani Siekkinen	9
51	(Bulgaria) Stanimir Ruslanow	9
14	(Serbia) Andreja Klasovic	4
11	(Netherlands) Ivar Saris	4
54	(Switzerland) Ronald Regli	9
43	(Sweden) Senarip Azar	3
22	(Norway) Mats Schjetne	9
27	(Austria) Mario He	5
38	(Serbia) Milos Verkic	9
59	(Greece) Nick Malai	9
6	(Cyprus) Lefteris Georgiou	3
7	(France) Alex Montpellier	1
58	(Northern Cyprus) Onuc Altur	9
39	(Poland) Tomasz Kapłan	9
26	(Denmark) Kasper Kristoffersen	7
23	(Poland) Mieszko Fortuński	9
42	(Portugal) Miguel Silva	5
55	(Spain) Manuel Montejo	4
10	(Russia) Fedor Gorst	9
15	(Finland) Kim Laaksonen	4
50	(Spain) David Alcaide	9
47	(Turkey) Onur Yildirim	3
18	(Germany) Sebastian Ludwig	9
31	(Czech Republic) Jan Meisner	9
34	(Luxembourg) Marc Glatz	5
63	(Spain) Francisco Díaz-Pizarro	9
2	(Sweden) Jesper Carlsson	1

Round of 32
(Turkey) F. Ozdemir	7
(Poland) K. Juszczyszyn	9
(Denmark) A. Madsen	2
(Netherlands) A. Lely	9
(Estonia) D. Grabe	1
(Austria) A. Ouschan	9
(Greece) N. Ekonomopoulos	8
(Denmark) B. Lotfy	9
(Switzerland) D. Jungo	5
(Netherlands) M. Bijsterbosch	9
(Sweden) M. Chamat	2
(Spain) F. Sánchez	9
(Portugal) J. Grilo	7
(Bulgaria) G. Georgiew	9
(Czech Republic) M. Hajdovsky	8
(Germany) J. Filler	9
(Spain) I.-A. Echevaria	3
(Germany) R. Souquet	9
(Finland) J. Siekkinen	7
(Bulgaria) S. Ruslanow	9
(Switzerland) R. Regli	9
(Norway) M. Schjetne	7
(Serbia) M. Verkic	4
(Greece) N. Malai	9
(Northern Cyprus) O. Altur	3
(Poland) T. Kapłan	9
(Poland) M. Fortuński	7
(Russia) F. Gorst	9
(Spain) D. Alcaide	3
(Germany) S. Ludwig	9
(Czech Republic) J. Meisner	8
(Spain) F. Díaz-Pizarro	9

Round of 16
(Poland) K. Juszczyszyn	9
(Netherlands) A. Lely	6
(Austria) A. Ouschan	9
(Denmark) B. Lotfy	7
(Netherlands) M. Bijsterbosch	6
(Spain) F. Sánchez	9
(Bulgaria) G. Georgiew	4
(Germany) J. Filler	9
(Germany) R. Souquet	3
(Bulgaria) S. Ruslanow	9
(Switzerland) R. Regli	9
(Greece) N. Malai	6
(Poland) T. Kapłan	9
(Russia) F. Gorst	5
(Germany) S. Ludwig	6
(Spain) F. Díaz-Pizarro	9

Quarter-final
(Poland) K. Juszczyszyn	9
(Austria) A. Ouschan	8
(Spain) F. Sánchez	8
(Germany) J. Filler	9
(Bulgaria) S. Ruslanow	9
(Switzerland) R. Regli	4
(Poland) T. Kapłan	6
(Spain) F. Díaz-Pizarro	9

Semi-final
(Poland) K. Juszczyszyn	9
(Germany) J. Filler	8
(Bulgaria) S. Ruslanow	9
(Spain) F. Díaz-Pizarro	8

Final
(Poland) K. Juszczyszyn	9
(Bulgaria) S. Ruslanow	7

=== Team ===
Round of 16
1	Austria	2
16	Switzerland	1
8	Portugal	1
9	Croatia	2
5	Bulgaria	0
12	Denmark	2
4	Spain	0
13	Poland	2
6	Bosnia and Herzegovina	0
11	Greece	2
3	Estonia	2
14	Russia	1
7	Netherlands	2
10	Czech Republic	0
2	Finland	2
15	Slovakia	1

Quarter-final
Austria	1
Croatia	2
Denmark	1
Poland	2
Greece	1
Estonia	2
Netherlands	2
Finland	1

Semi-final
Croatia	1
Poland	2
Estonia	0
Netherlands	2

Final
Poland	2
Netherlands	1
