= 2019 Klagenfurt Open =

Nine-ball pool tournament, held October 2019

Tournament information
- Dates: 11–14 October 2019
- Venue: Sportpark Klagenfurt
- City: Klagenfurt
- Country: Austria
- Organisation: Euro Tour
- Format: Single Elimination, Double elimination
- Total prize fund: €38,000
- Winner's share: €4,500
- Defending champion: Mario He (AUT) (m) / Jasmin Ouschan (AUT) (f)

Final
- Champion: Alexander Kazakis (GRE) (m) / Oliwia Czuprynska (POL) (f)
- Runner-up: Marc Bijsterbosch (NED) (m) / Marharyta Fefilava (BLR) (f)
- Score: 9–8 (m), 7–5 (f)

The 2019 Klagenfurt Open was a professional nine-ball pool tournament and the sixth of seven Euro Tour events of the 2019 Euro Tour season. The men's event was held between 11 and 13 October, whilst the women's event was held from 13 to 14 October 2019, held at the Sportpark Klagenfurt in Klagenfurt, Austria. The event featured a total prize fund of €38,000, with the winner of each event winning €4,500.

Mario He was the defending champion of the men's event, having defeated Mark Gray 9–8 in the final of the 2018 Klagenfurt Open. He reached the last 32 of the competition, before losing 9–1 to Eklent Kaçi. Greece's Alexander Kazakis won the event, defeating Dutch player Marc Bijsterbosch in the final 9–8. The defending champion of the women's event was Austrian player Jasmin Ouschan who defeated Ana Gradišnik in the 2018 final. Poland's Oliwia Czuprynska won the event, defeating Ouschan in the semi-finals, and Belarusian Marharyta Fefilava in the final 7–5.

== Tournament format ==
The event was held from 11 to 13 October for the men's event, and 13 to 14 October for the women's event. The event was played as a double elimination knockout tournament, until the last-32 stage for the men's event, and the last-16 for the women; where the tournament was contested as a single elimination bracket. Matches were all played as race-to-nine-racks in the men's, and race-to-seven-racks in the women's event.

The defending champions for the event were Austrian players Mario He and Jasmin Ouschan, who defeated Eklent Kaçi and Oliwia Zalewska respectively in the finals of the 2018 Klagenfurt Open.

=== Prize fund ===
The tournament prize fund was similar to that of other Euro Tour events, with €4,500 awarded to the winner of both event.

	Prize money
Winner	€4.500
Finalist	€3.000
Semi finalist	€1.750
Quarter finalist	€1.250
last 16	€1.000
Last 32	€600
33–48	€275
Total	€38.000

== Tournament results ==
=== Men's event ===
The following matches are from the round of 32 onward. Players in bold denote match winners.

1st Round
**(Germany) Joshua Filler**	9
(Czech Republic) Jakub Koniar	6
(Greece) Nikos Ekonomopoulos	8
**(Hungary) Olivér Szolnoki**	9
(Spain) Francisco Sanchez-Ruiz	3
**(Poland) Wojciech Szewczyk**	9
(Poland) Wojciech Szewczyk	8
**(Netherlands) Marc Bijsterbosch**	9
**(Portugal) Miguel Silva**	9
(Switzerland) Sascha Specchia	4
**(United Kingdom) Mark Gray**	9
(Poland) Piotr Ostrowski	2
**(Russia) Maksim Dudanets**	9
(Finland) Petri Makkonen	7
(Poland) Daniel Macioł	5
**(Estonia) Denis Grabe**	9
**(Bosnia and Herzegovina) Sanjin Pehlivanovic**	9
(Greece) Dimitris Loukatos	4
**(Poland) Wiktor Zielinski**	9
(Austria) Albin Ouschan	6
**(Greece) Damianos Giallourakis**	9
(Poland) Tomasz Kapłan	4
(Finland) Jani Siekkinen	5
**(Norway) Mats Schjetne**	9
(Austria) Maximilian Lechner	1
**(Russia) Ruslan Chinakhov**	9
(Denmark) Mickey Krause	3
**(Russia) Fedor Gorst**	9
**(Greece) Alexander Kazakis**	9
(Spain) David Alcaide	5
(Austria) Mario He	1
**(Albania) Eklent Kaçi**	9

2nd Round
**(Germany) Joshua Filler**	9
(Hungary) Olivér Szolnoki	7
(Poland) Wojciech Szewczyk	7
**(Netherlands) Marc Bijsterbosch**	9
**(Portugal) Miguel Silva**	9
(United Kingdom) Mark Gray	4
(Russia) Maksim Dudanets	2
**(Estonia) Denis Grabe**	9
(Bosnia and Herzegovina) Sanjin Pehlivanovic	5
**(Poland) Wiktor Zielinski**	9
(Greece) Damianos Giallourakis	6
**(Norway) Mats Schjetne**	9
(Russia) Ruslan Chinakhov	8
**(Russia) Fedor Gorst**	9
**(Greece) Alexander Kazakis**	9
(Albania) Eklent Kaçi	7

Quarterfinals
(Germany) Joshua Filler	8
**(Netherlands) Marc Bijsterbosch**	9
(Portugal) Miguel Silva	8
**(Estonia) Denis Grabe**	9
(Poland) Wiktor Zielinski	4
**(Norway) Mats Schjetne**	9
(Russia) Fedor Gorst	6
**(Greece) Alexander Kazakis**	9

Semifinals
**(Netherlands) Marc Bijsterbosch**	9
(Estonia) Denis Grabe	8
(Norway) Mats Schjetne
**(Greece) Alexander Kazakis**

Finals
(Netherlands) Marc Bijsterbosch	8
**(Greece) Alexander Kazakis**	9

=== Women's event ===
Below is the brackets from the single elimination round. Players in brackets denote match winners.

last-16
**Kristina Tkach** (RUS)	7
Diana Stateczny (GER)
Monika Margeta (SWE)
**Louise Furberg** (SWE)	7
Veronika Ivanovskaia (GER)
**Marharyta Fefilava** (BLR)	7
**Ana Gradišnik** (SLO)	7
Pia Filler (GER)
**Kristina Zlateva** (BUL)	7
Ina Kaplan (GER)
**Oliwia Czuprynska** (POL)	7
Tamara Peeters (NED)
**Melanie Suessenguth** (GER)	7
Kamila Khodjaeva (BEL)
**Jasmin Ouschan** (AUT)	7
Monika Zabek (POL)

Quarter-finals
(Russia) **Kristina Tkach**	7
(Sweden) Louise Furberg
(Belarus) **Marharyta Fefilava**	7
(Slovenia) Ana Gradišnik
(Bulgaria) Kristina Zlateva
(Poland) **Oliwia Czuprynska**	7
(Germany) Melanie Suessenguth
(Austria) **Jasmin Ouschan**	7

Semi-finals
(Russia) Kristina Tkach	3
(Belarus) **Marharyta Fefilava**	7
(Poland) **Oliwia Czuprynska**	7
(Austria) Jasmin Ouschan	6

Final
(Belarus) Marharyta Fefilava	5
(Poland) **Oliwia Czuprynska**	7
