= 2012 European Pool Championships =

Tournament information
- Dates: 21–31 March 2012
- Venue: Alvisse Parc Hotel
- City: Luxembourg City
- Country: Luxembourg
- Organisation: European Pocket Billiard Federation
- Format: double elimination, single elimination

The 2012 European Pool Championships was a professional pool tournament held 21–31 March 2012 in Alvisse Parc Hotel in Luxembourg City hosted by the European Pocket Billiard Federation (EPBF). The disciplines were played eight-ball, nine-ball, ten-ball and straight pool in the categories Men's, Ladies and wheelchairs. The wheelchair users played for the titles only in 8-ball, 9-ball and 10-ball. The most successful player was the Finnish wheelchair user Jouni Tähti who won two events, the Spaniard Francisco Díaz-Pizarro and the Austrian Mario He each won event and reached a semi-final in another once.

== Format ==
The event was first played in all categories in a double-elimination tournament followed by a single-elimination tournament from the quarter-final onwards.

== Winners ==
Discipline	Winner	Runner-up	Semi-finalists
Men – Straight pool	(Netherlands) Nick van den Berg	(Netherlands) Niels Feijen	(Austria) Mario He
Men – Straight pool	(Netherlands) Nick van den Berg	(Netherlands) Niels Feijen	(Estonia) Denis Grabe
Men – 10-Ball	(Germany) Dominic Jentsch	(France) Stephan Cohen	(Netherlands) Nick van den Berg
Men – 10-Ball	(Germany) Dominic Jentsch	(France) Stephan Cohen	(Russia) Witali Pawluchin
Men – 8-Ball	(Austria) Mario He	(Ukraine) Artem Koshovyi	(Spain) Francisco Díaz-Pizarro
Men – 8-Ball	(Austria) Mario He	(Ukraine) Artem Koshovyi	(Sweden) Andreas Gerwen
Men – 9-Ball	(Spain) Francisco Díaz-Pizarro	(Sweden) Marcus Chamat	(Albania) Nick Malai
Men – 9-Ball	(Spain) Francisco Díaz-Pizarro	(Sweden) Marcus Chamat	(Finland) Aki Heiskanen
Men – team	Spain	Germany	Finland
Men – team	Spain	Germany	Austria
Women – Straight pool	(Norway) Line Kjørsvik	(Russia) Anna Mazhirina	(Germany) Christine Wiechert
Women – Straight pool	(Norway) Line Kjørsvik	(Russia) Anna Mazhirina	(Austria) Jasmin Ouschan
Women – 10-Ball	(Austria) Jasmin Ouschan	(Russia) Natalia Seroshtan	(Norway) Line Kjørsvik
Women – 10-Ball	(Austria) Jasmin Ouschan	(Russia) Natalia Seroshtan	(Russia) Anna Mazhirina
Women – 8-Ball	(Russia) Natalia Seroshtan	(Finland) Marika Poikkijoki	(Russia) Daria Sirotina
Women – 8-Ball	(Russia) Natalia Seroshtan	(Finland) Marika Poikkijoki	(Austria) Jasmin Ouschan
Women – 9-Ball	(Finland) Marika Poikkijoki	(Germany) Jasmin Michel	(Norway) Line Kjørsvik
Women – 9-Ball	(Finland) Marika Poikkijoki	(Germany) Jasmin Michel	(Austria) Jasmin Ouschan
Women – Team	Poland	Norway	Russia
Women – Team	Poland	Norway	Austria
Wheelchair – 10-Ball	(England) Daniel Luton	(Republic of Ireland) Fred Dinsmore	(Austria) Emil Schranz
Wheelchair – 10-Ball	(England) Daniel Luton	(Republic of Ireland) Fred Dinsmore	(Sweden) Henrik Larsson
Wheelchair – 8-Ball	(Finland) Jouni Tähti	(England) Roy Kimberley	(Republic of Ireland) Fred Dinsmore
Wheelchair – 8-Ball	(Finland) Jouni Tähti	(England) Roy Kimberley	(Germany) Tankred Volkmer
Wheelchair – 9-Ball	(Finland) Jouni Tähti	(England) Daniel Luton	(Republic of Ireland) Fred Dinsmore
Wheelchair – 9-Ball	(Finland) Jouni Tähti	(England) Daniel Luton	(England) Roy Kimberley

== Men's ==
The events from the quarter-finals are shown below.

=== 8-Ball ===
Quarter-final; Race to 8
(Finland) Petri Makkonen	4
(Austria) Mario He	8
(Russia) Ruslan Tschinachow	7
(Spain) Francisco Díaz-Pizarro	8
(Ukraine) Artem Koshovyi	8
(Poland) Tomasz Kapłan	7
(Sweden) Andreas Gerwen	8
(Spain) David Alcaide	4

Semi-final; Race to 8
(Austria) Mario He	8
(Spain) Francisco Díaz-Pizarro	7
(Ukraine) Artem Koshovyi	8
(Sweden) Andreas Gerwen	3

Final; Race to 8
(Austria) Mario He	8
(Ukraine) Artem Koshovyi	0

=== 9-Ball ===
Quarter-final; Race to 9
(Albania) Nick Malai	9
(France) Vincent Facquet	5
(Portugal) Manuel Gama	8
(Spain) Francisco Díaz-Pizarro	9
(Finland) Aki Heiskanen	9
(Austria) Albin Ouschan	7
(Austria) Mario He	7
(Sweden) Marcus Chamat	9

Semi-final; Race to 9
(Albania) Nick Malai	6
(Spain) Francisco Díaz-Pizarro	9
(Finland) Aki Heiskanen	4
(Sweden) Marcus Chamat	9

Final; Race to 9
(Spain) Francisco Díaz-Pizarro	9
(Sweden) Marcus Chamat	4

=== 10-Ball ===
Quarter-final; Race to 8
(France) Stephan Cohen	8
(Spain) David Alcaide	6
(Germany) Manuel Ederer	4
(Russia) Witali Pawluchin	8
(Netherlands) Nick van den Berg	8
(Ukraine) Artem Koshovyi	7
(Russia) Konstantin Stepanov	5
(Germany) Dominic Jentsch	8

Semi-final; Race to 8
(France) Stephan Cohen	8
(Russia) Witali Pawluchin	7
(Netherlands) Nick van den Berg	5
(Germany) Dominic Jentsch	8

Final; Race to 8
(France) Stephan Cohen	5
(Germany) Dominic Jentsch	8

=== Straight pool ===
Quarter-final; Race to 125
(Malta) Tony Drago	84
(Netherlands) Niels Feijen	125
(Germany) Klaus Zobrekis	121
(Estonia) Denis Grabe	125
(Poland) Konrad Piekarski	43
(Austria) Mario He	125
(Serbia) Zoran Svilar	82
(Netherlands) Nick van den Berg	125

Semi-final; Race to 125
(Netherlands) Niels Feijen	125
(Estonia) Denis Grabe	16
(Austria) Mario He	51
(Netherlands) Nick van den Berg	125

Final; Race to 125
(Netherlands) Niels Feijen	18
(Netherlands) Nick van den Berg	125

== Women's ==
The events from the quarter-finals are shown below.

=== 8-Ball ===
Quarter-final; Race to 6
(Netherlands) Tamara Rademakers	4
(Russia) Nataliya Seroshtan	6
(Netherlands) Kynthia Orfanidou	3
(Russia) Darya Sirotina	6
(Austria) Jasmin Ouschan	6
(Germany) Jasmin Michel	0
(Austria) Sandra Baumgartner	0
(Finland) Marika Poikkijoki	6

Semi-final; Race to 6
(Russia) Nataliya Seroshtan	6
(Russia) Darya Sirotina	4
(Austria) Jasmin Ouschan	5
(Finland) Marika Poikkijoki	6

Final; Race to 6
(Russia) Nataliya Seroshtan	6
(Finland) Marika Poikkijoki	3

=== 9-Ball ===
Quarter-final; Race to 7
(Austria) Jasmin Ouschan	7
(Russia) Anna Mazhirina	2
(Portugal) Sara Rocha	6
(Germany) Jasmin Michel	7
(Finland) Marika Poikkijoki	7
(Spain) Silvia Lopez	4
(Austria) Petra Stadlbauer	2
(Norway) Line Kjørsvik	7

Semi-final; Race to 7
(Austria) Jasmin Ouschan	3
(Germany) Jasmin Michel	7
(Finland) Marika Poikkijoki	7
(Norway) Line Kjorsvik	3

Final; Race to 7
(Germany) Jasmin Michel	3
(Finland) Marika Poikkijoki	7

=== 10-Ball ===
Quarter-final; Race to 6
(Austria) Jasmin Ouschan	6
(Russia) Darya Sirotina	1
(Norway) Line Kjørsvik	6
(Italy) Silvia Gaudino	1
(Russia) Anna Mazhirina	6
(Germany) Kim Witzel	5
(Spain) Amalia Matas	5
(Russia) Nataliya Seroshtan	6

Semi-final; Race to 6
(Austria) Jasmin Ouschan	6
(Norway) Line Kjorsvik	4
(Russia) Anna Mazhirina	1
(Russia) Nataliya Seroshtan	6

Final; Race to 6
(Austria) Jasmin Ouschan	6
(Russia) Nataliya Seroshtan	5

=== Straight pool ===
Quarter-final; Race to 75
(Austria) Jasmin Ouschan	75
(Austria) Petra Stadlbauer	37
(Russia) Anna Mazhirina	75
(Ukraine) Kateryna Polovinchuk	57
(Sweden) Louise Furberg	62
(Norway) Line Kjørsvik	75
(Germany) Christine Wiechert	75
(Russia) Nataliya Seroshtan	55

Semi-final; Race to 75
(Austria) Jasmin Ouschan	29
(Russia) Anna Mazhirina	75
(Norway) Line Kjorsvik	75
(Germany) Christine Wiechert	45

Final; Race to 75
(Russia) Anna Mazhirina	42
(Norway) Line Kjorsvik	75

== Wheelchair event ==
The events from the quarter-finals are shown below.

=== 8-Ball ===
Semi-final; Race to 5
1	(Finland) Jouni Tähti	5
4	(Republic of Ireland) Fred Dinsmore	4
3	(Germany) Tankred Volkmer	2
2	(United Kingdom) Roy Kimberley	5

Final; Race to 5
(Finland) Jouni Tähti	5
(United Kingdom) Roy Kimberley	2

=== 9-Ball ===
Semi-final; Race to 7
1	(United Kingdom) Daniel Luton	7
4	(United Kingdom) Roy Kimberley	5
3	(Finland) Jouni Tähti	7
2	(Republic of Ireland) Fred Dismore	4

Final; Race to 7
(United Kingdom) Daniel Luton	2
(Finland) Jouni Tähti	7

=== 10-Ball ===
Semi-final; Race to 6
1	(United Kingdom) Daniel Luton	6
4	(Austria) Emil Schranz	3
3	(Sweden) Henrik Larsson	2
2	(Republic of Ireland) Fred Dinsmore	6

Final; Race to 6
(United Kingdom) Daniel Luton	6
(Republic of Ireland) Fred Dinsmore	3

== Team event ==
The team competitions initially took place in a double elimination event. From the quarter-finals (men) or from the semifinals (ladies) was played in a single elimination format. One team consisted of three players. A game consisted of three individual games in the disciplines 8-ball, 9-ball and 10-ball. In the women's team, two players were in each team, one game consisted of two individual games in 8-ball and 9-Ball.

The events from the quarter-finals are shown below.

=== Men ===
Quarter-final
Germany	2
Norway	1
Austria	3
Slovakia	0
Finland	2
Poland	1
Netherlands	0
Spain	3

Semi-final
Germany	2
Austria	1
Finland	1
Spain	2

Final
Germany	1
Spain	2

=== Women ===
Semi-final
1	Austria	2
4	Norway	4
3	Russia	0
2	Poland	2

Final
Norway	4
Poland	5

== Medals' table ==
Place	Nation	Winner	Runner-up	Semi-finalist
1	Finland	3	1	2
2	Austria	2	0	7
3	Spain	2	0	1
4	Russia	1	2	4
5	Germany	1	2	2
6	United Kingdom	1	2	1
7	Norway	1	1	2
8	Netherlands	1	1	1
9	Poland	1	0	0
10	Ireland	0	1	2
10	Sweden	0	1	2
12	France	0	1	0
12	Ukraine	0	1	0
14	Estonia	0	0	1
14	Albania	0	0	1
