= 2019 European Pool Championship =

European Pool Championships, April/May 2019

Tournament information
- Dates: 26 April–8 May 2019
- Venue: Best Western Premier
- City: Treviso
- Country: Italy
- Organisation: European Pool Championships

Champions

Straight pool
- Men's: Karol Skowerski
- Women's: Kristina Tkach

8-Ball
- Men's: Eklent Kaçi
- Women's: Kristina Tkach
- Wheelchair: Jouni Tähti

9-Ball
- Men's: Fedor Gorst
- Women's: Jasmin Ouschan
- Wheelchair: Jouni Tähti

10-Ball
- Men's: Mieszko Fortunski
- Women's: Christine Feldmann
- Wheelchair: Henrik Larsson

The 2019 European Pool Championships (also known as the 2019 Dynamic Billiards European Pool Championships) was a series of professional pool championships that took place at the Best Western Premier in Treviso, Italy. The event was played between 26 April and 8 May 2019 and was the 39th edition of the European Pool Championships that were first held in 1980. The championships saw events for men, women, under 23s and wheelchairs across five disciplines; straight pool, eight-ball, nine-ball, ten-ball and a team event.

Russian players won the most medals over the course of the series, with seven – winning three events. Russia's Kristina Tkach was the most successful female player, winning two events, losing only once in the final of the ten-ball event. Jasmin Ouschan won the nine-ball event, with a whitewash over Nataliya Seroshtan. Finland's Jouni Tähti was the most successful wheelchair player, winning two of the three handicapped events.

== Overview ==
The European Pool Championships are an annual series of pool tournaments for players in Europe which were first held in 1980. The 2019 event featured matches played over 24 tables, and was held between 26 April and 8 May 2019 at the Best Western Premier in Treviso, Italy. The event also set as a prelude to the 2019 Treviso Open event for the Euro Tour held in the same location. The series features events for four disciplines of pool – straight, eight-ball, nine-ball, and ten-ball – as well as a team event. Every event has a separate tournament for both men and women, with a wheelchair event in eight, nine and ten-ball. An event for junior players who are under 23 was also played for eight and nine-ball events.

The tournaments were played as a double-elimination bracket, with players qualifying for a single elimination knockout. Each discipline was played to a different length, with matches in straight pool being played to 125 points in the men's event, and 75 in the women's competition. The eight and ten-ball events was played as a race–to–8 rack, with the women's and wheelchair events as race–to–6 racks. The nine-ball event was held as race–to–9 racks for the men's and juniors events, with women's and wheelchairs as race–to–7 racks. The series was sponsored by billiards and pool online store Dynamic Billiard.

== Tournament summary ==
The championships began 26 April 2019, with the straight pool event. Three Polish players reached the semi-finals of the men's event alongside Austria's Mario He. Karol Skowerski defeated He 125–32 and Tomas Kaplan defeated Mariusz Skoneczny 125–69 to complete an all-Polish final. Skowerski won his first individual European championship by defeating Skoneczny 125–45, with a run of 106. In the women's event, Russian player Kristina Tkach defeated Marharyta Fefilava in the semi-final, whilst the Netherlands' Tamara Peeters-Rademakers defeated Swiss player Claudia von Rorh. Rorh had previously defeated defending champion Jasmin Ouschan earlier in the tournament. Tkach won the final, defeating Peeters-Rademakers 75–23 to win the gold medal.

The ten-ball event began on 31 April, and featured 101 participants in the men's, and 43 for the women's division. Mieszko Fortunski met Casper Matikainen in the final of the men's event. Matikainen won the first three racks, but lost eight of the next nine racks for Fortunski to win the event 8–4. Having already won the straight pool event, Tkach reached the final of the ten-ball event. She met Christine Feldmann in the final, but lost her only match at the championships, with Feldmann winning 6–3. Sweden's Henrik Larsson won the wheelchair event, defeating Latvian player Kaspars Turks 6–1 in the final.

The eight-ball competition commenced on 2 May. Eklent Kaçi and Ralf Souquet meet in the final. Albanian Kaçi had never won a European championship title, with Souquet having won 22 previously. Kaçi took a 6–1 lead, but Souquet won five of the next six to trail by one rack. Kaçi won rack 14 to capture his first championship 8–6. Tkach contested the third final of the event in the women's eight-ball event, where she met Jasmin Ouschan. Ouschan won the first four racks of the final, before Tkach won three to trail 3–4. On the verge of equalling the score, Tkach miscued allowing Ouschan to take a two rack lead. With the break to win the match, Ouschan missed her first shot, allowing Tkach to run the next two racks to tie the match at 5–5, and win the match 6–5. Finland's Jouni Tähti won the wheelchair event, defeating Roy Kimberley 5–2 to win his 25th European medal. In the Under 23s, Pijus Labutis played Vitaliy Patsura in the final, winning 8–4.

The team events began 5 May. The men's competition featured national teams consisting of three players, with a match of eight, nine and ten-ball in each tie. In the final, the Spanish team of Francisco Díaz-Pizarro, Francisco Sánchez Ruiz and David Alcaide played the Austrian side of Albin Ouschan, Maximilian Lechner, and Mario He. Díaz-Pizarro was the first player to win a match, winning his ten-ball match 8–3 against Ouschan. Sanchez-Ruiz defeated He 9–5 to win the tournament, that eventually finished as a 3–0 victory for the Spanish team. The women's event was played with national teams consisting of two players. Ties consisted of one match of eight-ball and one of nine-ball. If a tie ended 1–1, a match of doubles in ten-ball was used as a tie-breaker. The Portuguese team of Vania Franco and Sara Rocha reached the final without losing a match, where they met the German pair of Tina Vogelmann and Veronika Ivanovskaia. Franco defeated Vogelmann 6–3 in eight-ball, whilst Rocha defeated Ivanovskaia 7–2 in nine-ball to win the final 2–0. In winning, the Portuguese team went undefeated.

The final event was the nine-ball championships, beginning on 6 May. Russian player Fedor Gorst played Joshua Filler in the final. Gorst took an early lead in the match, with Filler making a lot of dry breaks. Gorst took an 8–4 lead, before Filler won four straight racks to lead the match to hill/hill. Gorst had the break for the deciding rack, and run the rack to win 9–8. Jasmin Ouschan met Russian Nataliya Seroshtan in the final of the women's nine-ball event, where she won in a whitewash 7–0. Having already won the eight-ball under 23 event, Pijus Labutis met Olivér Szolnoki in the final of the junior nine-ball event. Labutis won the final 9–7. The final event of the championships was the wheelchair nine-ball event, where Jouni Tähti defeated Irishman Fred Dinsmore 7–1.

== Medals table ==
On the overall medals table, Russia were top, having won three events and seven medals. Poland were second, with seven titles, but only two event victories. Finland placed third, with two event wins by Jouni Tähti. The full table is shown below:

Rank	Nation	Gold	Silver	Bronze	Total
1	Russia	3	2	2	7
2	Poland	2	1	4	7
3	Finland	2	1	3	6
4	Lithuania	2	0	0	2
5	Austria	1	2	2	5
6	Portugal	1	0	1	2
6	Sweden	1	0	1	2
6	Switzerland	1	0	1	2
9	Albania	1	0	0	1
9	Spain	1	0	0	1
11	Germany	0	3	3	6
12	Great Britain	0	1	3	4
13	Ireland	0	1	1	2
13	Netherlands	0	1	1	2
15	Hungary	0	1	0	1
15	Latvia	0	1	0	1
15	Ukraine	0	1	0	1
18	Belarus	0	0	2	2
18	Slovenia	0	0	2	2
20	Bosnia and Herzegovina	0	0	1	1
20	Bulgaria	0	0	1	1
20	France	0	0	1	1
20	Serbia	0	0	1	1
Totals (23 entries)		15	15	30	60
