= 2011 European Pool Championships =

European pool tournament, held 2011

Tournament information
- Dates: 23 March–3 April 2011
- Venue: Steel Palace
- City: Brandenburg
- Country: Germany
- Organisation: European Pool Championships

Champions

Straight pool
- Men's: (Poland) Tomasz Kapłan
- Women's: (Austria) Jasmin Ouschan

8-Ball
- Men's: (Germany) Dominic Jentsch
- Women's: (Netherlands) Kynthia Orfanidou
- Wheelchair: (Finland) Jouni Tähti

9-Ball
- Men's: (Netherlands) Nick van den Berg
- Women's: (Austria) Jasmin Ouschan
- Wheelchair: (Sweden) Henrik Larsson

10-Ball
- Men's: (France) Stephan Cohen
- Women's: (Austria) Jasmin Ouschan
- Wheelchair: (Finland) Jouni Tähti

The 2011 European Pool Championships was a series of professional pool championships that took place at the Steel Palace, in Brandenburg, Germany. The events were played between 23 March and 3 April 2011 were part of the European Pool Championships; and featured events for men, women and wheelchair players across four pool disciplines: straight Pool, eight-ball, nine-ball, and ten-ball. The tournament was hosted by the European Pocket Billiard Federation and organised by the International Billiard Promotion, with the final of the men's nine-ball event broadcast on Eurosport. Austria was the most successful nation, winning three events – all by Jasmin Ouschan. Jouni Tähti won two of the three wheelchair events, losing just one match in the final of the nine-ball tournament to Henrik Larsson.

== Overview ==
The European Pool Championships are an annual series of pool tournaments for players in Europe which were first held in 1980. The 2011 event was held between 23 March and 3 April 2011 at the Steel Palace in Brandenburg, Germany. The series features events for four disciplines of pool – straight, eight-ball, nine-ball, and ten-ball. Every event had a separate tournament for men, women and wheelchair competitors. The event was hosted by the European Pocket Billiard Federation and organised by the International Billiard Promotion.

The tournaments were played as a double-elimination bracket, with players qualifying for a single elimination knockout. Each discipline was played to a different length, with matches in straight pool being played to 125 points in the men's event, and 75 in the women's competition. The eight and ten-ball events was played as a race–to–8 rack, with the women's and wheelchair as race–to–6 racks. The nine-ball event was held as race–to–9 racks for the men's and juniors series, with women's and wheelchairs as race–to–7 racks. The final and semi-finals of the nine-ball event was broadcast on Eurosport.

== Tournament Summary ==
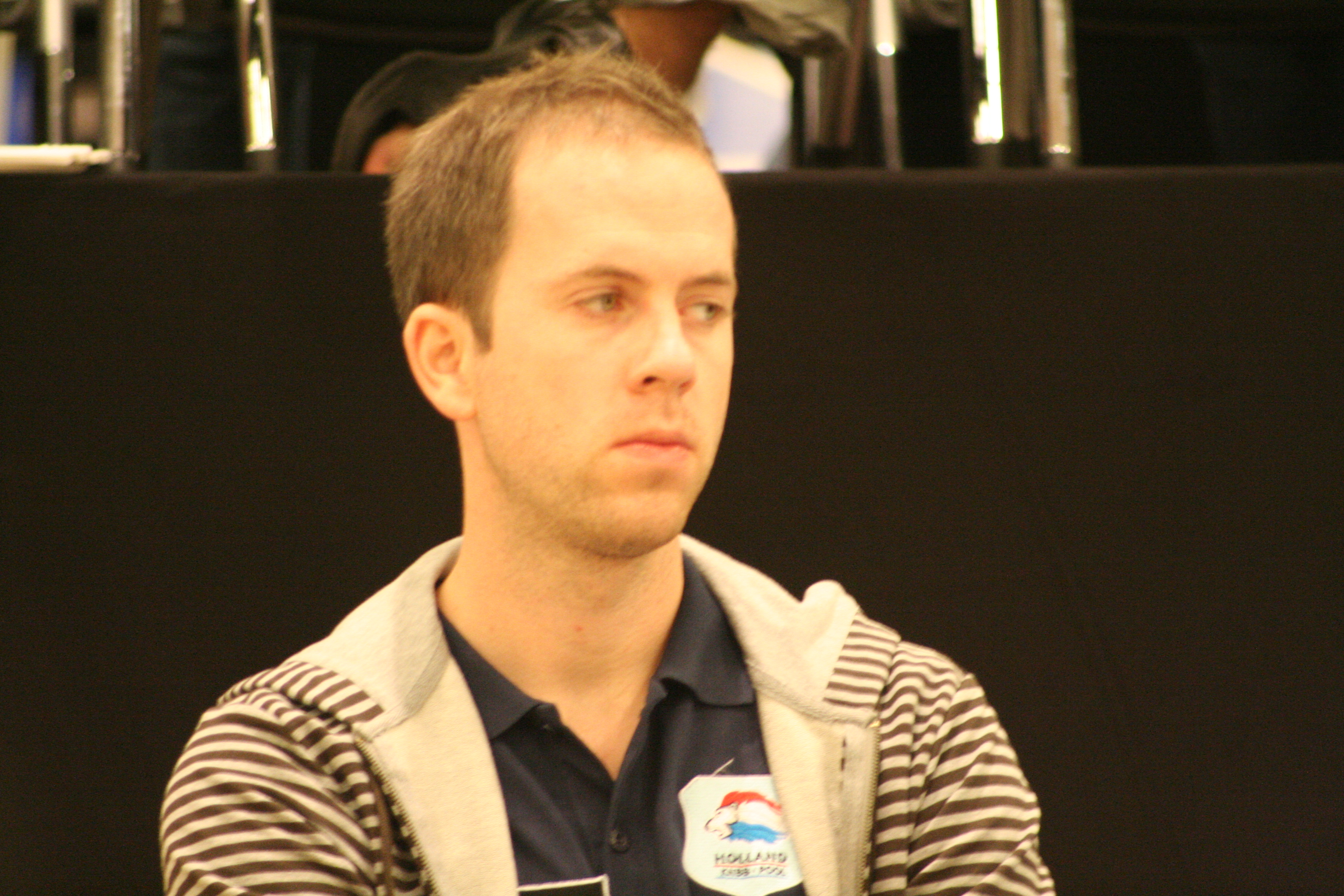
Nick van den Berg won the men's nine-ball event.

The event began with the straight pool events held between 24 and 26 March for men and women. The quarter-finals of the men's event featured three German players, but were all defeated. In the semi-finals, Tomasz Kapłan defeated Petri Makkonen 125–102 and Fabio Petroni defeated Roman Pruchay 125–73. Polish player Kaplan won the final, the first pole to win the event defeating Petroni 125–17. In the women's event, defending champion Jasmin Ouschan reached the final for a second year, and won the event with a 75–31 win over Line Kjørsvik.

The eight-ball event was played between 26 and 28 March. Dominic Jentsch of Germany won the men's event, defeating compatriot Ralf Souquet in the final, 8–1. Dutch player Kynthia Orfanidis had previously reached two semi-finals, but won her first European championship by defeating Finland's Marika Poikkijoki in the women's eight-ball final 6–4. In the first of three wheelchair events, the eight-ball tournament was won by Jouni Tähti, a 5–1 victory over Belgium's Kurt Deklerck in the final.

The nine-ball event was held between 28 and 1 April, with both the men's semi-finals and final broadcast on Eurosport. Nick van den Berg defeated Huidji See in the first semi-final 9–7 in a match filled with mistakes, whilst Mario He defeated Francisco Sanchez-Ruiz 9–7. In the final, the number one ranked player on the Euro Tour, van den Berg defeated He 11–3. Both of the players who met in the final of the women's straight pool final, Ouschan and Kjørsvik contested the semi-final of the women's nine-ball event. Ouschan won again, this time in a 7–0 whitewash of Kjørsvik. In the final she met Gerda Hofstätter who defeated Anastasia Nechaeva 7–4. The all-Austrian final was won by Ouschan, 7–2. In the wheelchair event, six-time European champion Henrik Larsson met Tähti in the final. Larsson lead 3–1 and 5–3 before winning the match 7–6 on a deciding rack.

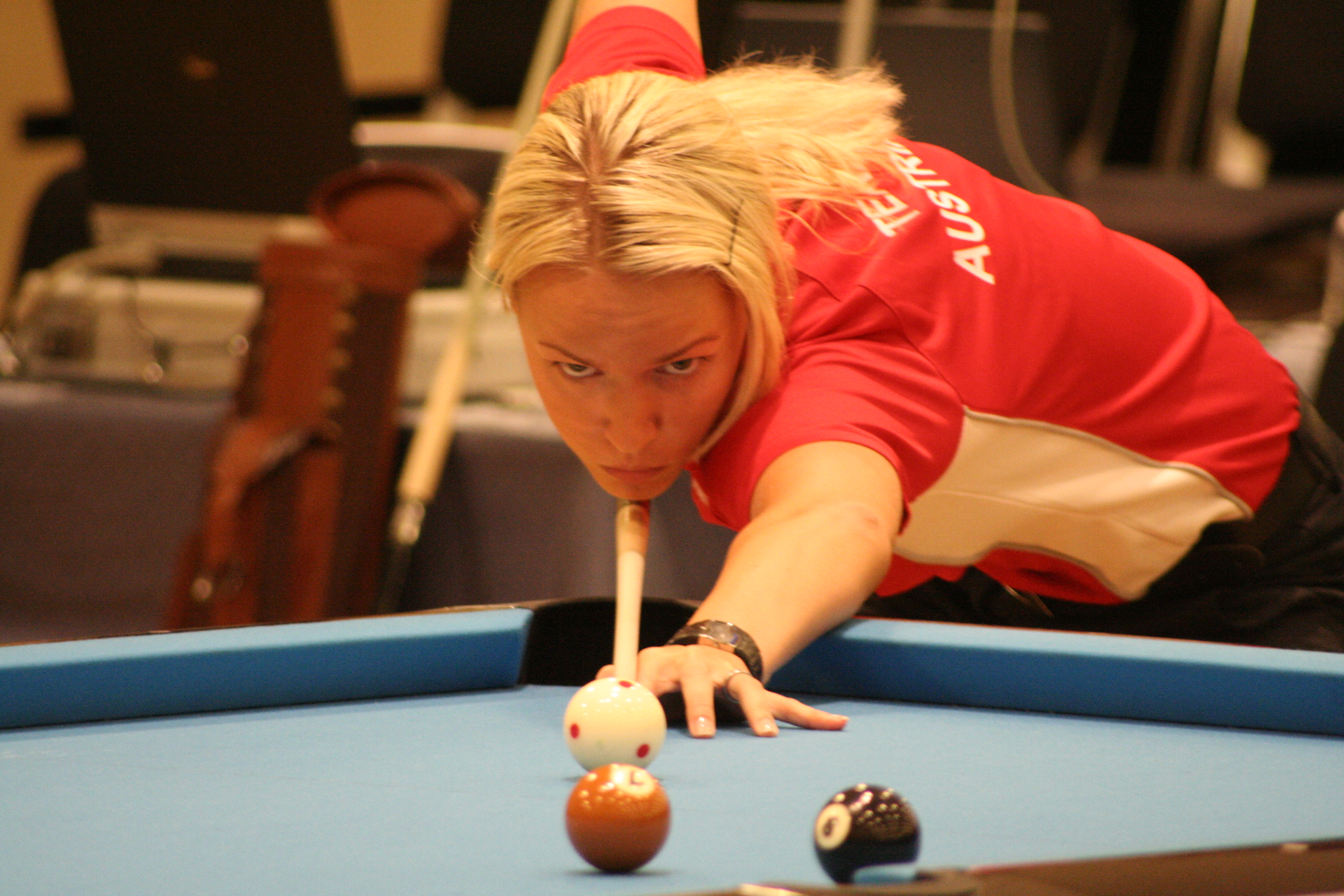
Jasmin Ouschan won three of the four women's events

The ten-ball event was only being held for the second time in the championships and was played between 30 March and 2 April. French player Stephan Cohen met Poland's Radosław Babica in the men's final, where Cohen won 8–6. Ouschan won her third event of the championships in the women's ten-ball event, after she defeated Nataliya Seroshtan 6–1. The wheelchair ten-ball event was a rematch of the wheelchair nine-ball final between Larsson and Tähti, with Tähti winning 5–1. Ouschan was the event's most successful player, winning three events, the nine-ball, ten-ball and straight pool. She lost her only match of the championships in the quarter-finals of the eight-ball competition. Tähti won two of the three wheelchair events, losing his only match in the final of the wheelchair nine-ball to Larsson 5–6.

== Results ==
Date(s)	Discipline	Winner	Runner-up	Semi-finals	Ref.
24-26 March	Straight Pool (men)	Tomasz Kapłan (POL)	Fabio Petroni (ITA)	Petri Makkonen (FIN)	
24-26 March	Straight Pool (men)	Tomasz Kapłan (POL)	Fabio Petroni (ITA)	Roman Prutschay (RUS)	
26-28 March	Eight-ball (men)	Dominic Jentsch (DEU)	Ralf Souquet (DEU)	Denis Grabe (EST)	
26-28 March	Eight-ball (men)	Dominic Jentsch (DEU)	Ralf Souquet (DEU)	Carlos Cabello (ESP)	
28-31 March	Nine-ball (men)	Nick van den Berg (NLD)	Mario He (AUT)	Huidji See (NLD)	
28-31 March	Nine-ball (men)	Nick van den Berg (NLD)	Mario He (AUT)	Francisco Sánchez (ESP)	
30 March-2 April	Ten-ball (men)	Stephan Cohen (FRA)	Radosław Babica (POL)	Manuel Gama (PRT)	
30 March-2 April	Ten-ball (men)	Stephan Cohen (FRA)	Radosław Babica (POL)	Konstantin Stepanov (RUS)	
24-26 March	Straight pool (women)	Jasmin Ouschan (AUT)	Line Kjørsvik (NOR)	Anna Mazhirina (RUS)	
24-26 March	Straight pool (women)	Jasmin Ouschan (AUT)	Line Kjørsvik (NOR)	Silvia Lopez (ESP)	
26–28 March	eight-ball (women)	Kynthia Orfanidou (NLD)	Marika Poikkijoki (FIN)	Petra Stadlbauer (AUT)	
26–28 March	eight-ball (women)	Kynthia Orfanidou (NLD)	Marika Poikkijoki (FIN)	Line Kjørsvik (NOR)	
28–31 March	nine-ball (women)	Jasmin Ouschan (AUT)	Gerda Hofstätter (DEU)	Line Kjørsvik (NOR)	
28–31 March	nine-ball (women)	Jasmin Ouschan (AUT)	Gerda Hofstätter (DEU)	Anastasia Nechaeva (RUS)	
30 March–2 April	ten-ball (women)	Jasmin Ouschan (AUT)	Natalia Seroshtan (RUS)	Anna Mazhirina (RUS)	
30 March–2 April	ten-ball (women)	Jasmin Ouschan (AUT)	Natalia Seroshtan (RUS)	Kamila Khodjaeva (BEL)	
26–28 March	eight-ball (wheelchair)	Jouni Tähti (FIN)	Kurt Deklerck (BEL)	Aslam Abubaker (ENG)	
26–28 March	eight-ball (wheelchair)	Jouni Tähti (FIN)	Kurt Deklerck (BEL)	Fred Dinsmore (IRL)	
28–31 March	nine-ball (wheelchair)	Henrik Larsson (SWE)	Jouni Tähti (FIN)	Roy Kimberley (ENG)	
28–31 March	nine-ball (wheelchair)	Henrik Larsson (SWE)	Jouni Tähti (FIN)	Tony Southern (ENG)	
30 March–2 April	ten-ball (wheelchair)	Jouni Tähti (FIN)	Henrik Larsson (SWE)	Roy Kimberley (ENG)	
30 March–2 April	ten-ball (wheelchair)	Jouni Tähti (FIN)	Henrik Larsson (SWE)	Aslam Abubaker (ENG)	
