= 2018 Klagenfurt Open =

Tournament information
- Dates: 10–12 October 2018
- Venue: Sportpark Klagenfurt
- City: Klagenfurt
- Country: Austria
- Organisation: Euro Tour
- Format: Single Elimination, Double elimination
- Total prize fund: €36,000
- Winner's share: €4,500

Final
- Champion: (Austria) Mario He
- Runner-up: (England) Mark Gray
- Score: 9–8

The Dynamic Billard Klagenfurt Open 2018 (sometimes known as the 2018 Austrian Open) was the fifth and penultimate Euro Tour 9-Ball pool event in 2018. The event was won by Austria's Mario He who defeated England's Mark Gray 9–8 in the final. This was He's 4th championship, and second of the Euro Tour season - having already won the 2018 Veldhoven Open.

Ralf Souquet was the defending champion, after having won the 2017 Klagenfurt Open, but lost matches to Kim Laaksonen and Maksim Dudanets in the double elimination round.

== Tournament format ==
The event saw a total of 193 players compete, in a double-elimination knockout tournament, until the last 32 stage; where the tournament was contested as single elimination.

=== Prize fund ===
The tournament prize fund was similar to that of other Euro Tour events, with €4,500 for the winner of the event.

	Prize money
Winner	4.500 €
Finalist	€3.000
Semifinalist	€1.750
quarterfinalist	€1.250
last 16	€1.000
Last 32	€500
33–48 Place	€250
Total	€36.000

== Tournament results ==
1st Round
(Germany) Joshua Filler	9
(Spain) David Alcaide	7
(Syria) Mohammed Soufi	9
(United Kingdom) Imran Majid	8
(Poland) Wojciech Sroczynski	9
(Greece) Konstantin Koukiadakis	7
(Netherlands) Marc Bijsterbosch	9
(Albania) Arjan Matrizi	3
(Finland) Kim Laaksonen	3
(Poland) Mateusz Śniegocki	9
(England) Mark Gray	9
(Slovenia) Matjaz Erculj	8
(Poland) 'Wojciech Szewczyk	9
(Bosnia and Herzegovina) Sanjin Pehlivanovic	8
(Netherlands) Niels Feijen	9
(Poland) Wiktor Zielinski	6
(Czech Republic) Roman Hybler	9
(Greece) Damianos Giallourakis	2
(Slovakia) Jakub Koniar	9
(Netherlands) Ivo Aarts	3
(Greece) Alexander Kazakis	9
(Russia) Maksim Dudanets	3
(Austria) Mario He	9
(Finland) Jani Uski	4
(Estonia) Denis Grabe	9
(Russia) Sergey Lutsker	6
(Netherlands) Ivar Saris	5
(Spain) Francisco Sánchez Ruiz	9
(Germany) Jan Wolf	6
(Hungary) Olivér Szolnoki	9
(Poland) Radosław Babica	6
(Sweden) Christian Fischer	9

2nd Round
(Germany) Joshua Filler	9
(Syria) Mohammad Soufi	6
(Greece) Konstantinos Koukiadakis	5
(Netherlands) Marc Bijsterbosch	9
(Poland) Mateusz Śniegocki	6
(United Kingdom) Mark Gray	9
(Poland) Wojciech Szewczyk	8
(Netherlands) Niels Feijen	9
(Czech Republic) Roman Hybler	5
(Slovakia) Jakub Koniar	9
(Greece) Alexander Kazakis	5
(Austria) Mario He	9
(Estonia) Denis Grabe	6
(Spain) Francisco Sánchez Ruiz	9
(Hungary) Olivér Szolnoki	9
(Sweden) Christian Fischer	4

Quarterfinals
(Germany) Joshua Filler	4
(Netherlands) Marc Bijsterbosch	9
(United Kingdom) Mark Gray	9
(Netherlands) Niels Feijen	6
(Slovakia) Jakub Koniar	5
(Austria) Mario He	9
(Spain) Francisco Sánchez Ruiz	5
(Hungary) Olivér Szolnoki	9

Semifinals
(Netherlands) Marc Bijsterbosch	5
(United Kingdom) Mark Gray	9
(Austria) Mario He	9
(Hungary) Olivér Szolnoki	5

Finals
(United Kingdom) Mark Gray	8
(Austria) Mario He	9
