= Nick Malai =

Albanian pool player (born 1987)

Personal information
- Born: 9 April 1987 (age 39)

Pool career
- Country: Albania

Tournament wins
- Major: 2011 Kremlin Cup

Nikolaos "Nick" Malai (born 9 April 1987) is an Albanian professional pool player. Malai is a former winner of an event on the Euro Tour, winning the 2012 North Cyprus Open.

== Career ==
In February 2008, Malai reached his first Euro Tour knockout round at the 2008 French Open. In the round of the last 32, however, he lost against Sweden's Marcus Chamat. Malai played at the 2011 European Pool Championships reaching the knockout stage in 9-ball before losing to eventual champion Nick van den Bergwith 3–9.

In January 2012 Malai finished third at the Paris Open. In the 2012 European Pool Championships he reached the semi-finals in the 9-ball and lost 6–9 against to the eventual champion Francisco Díaz-Pizarro. In July 2012, Malai first participated in the 2012 WPA World Nine-ball Championship reaching the round of the last 64, in which he lost against Ralf Souquet. At the 2012 North Cyprus Open after victories against Daryl Peach, Jasmin Ouschan and Dominic Jentsch he reached the final, in which he defeat Albin Ouschan 9–5 to win his first event on the Euro Tour.

At the 2013 European Pool Championships, Malai reached the semifinals in 10-ball, before losing 4:-8 against Konstantin Stepanov. In the 2013 WPA World Nine-ball Championship he reached the round of the last 64 before losing to John Morra. In February 2015, he reached his second Euro Tour final, at the 2015 Italian Open, where he lost 2–9 to Niels Feijen.

== Titles ==
- 2011 Kremlin Cup
- 2012 Euro Tour North Cyprus Open
