= Zoran Svilar =

Serbian pool player

Personal information
- Born: 21 February 1976 (age 50)

Pool career
- Country: Serbia
- Pool games: 8-Ball, 9-Ball, 10-Ball

Zoran Svilar is a Serbian professional pool player. He reached the final in three European Pool Championships events.

At the 2008 European Pool Championships he reached the final in both eight-ball and nine-ball. In the eight-ball final he lost to Swedish player Marcus Chamat 3 racks to 8. In the nine-ball event he went hill-hill but was defeated 8–9 by Stephan Cohen.

At the 2012 event, Svilar was knocked out in the quarter-finals in Straight pool against later European champion Nick van den Berg. At the 2013 event he lost in the final against Niels Feijen 6–9 in nine-ball.

At the 2012 World Cup of Pool, Svilar represented Serbia together with Andreja Klasovic. The pair were eliminated in the first round against the German team of Ralf Souquet and Thorsten Hohmann.
