= Gradišnik =

Gradišnik is a Slovenian surname. Notable people with the surname include:

- Ana Gradišnik (born 1996), Slovenian pool player
- Branko Gradišnik (born 1951), Slovenian writer and translator
- Janez Gradišnik (1917–2009), Slovenian author and translator
