= Pia Filler =

German pool player (born 1998)

Personal information
- Born: 7 June 1998 (age 28) Stolberg, Germany

Pool career
- Country: Germany
- Turned pro: 2020
- Pool games: 9-Ball

Tournament wins
- Current rank: 4 WPA

Pia Filler (née Blaeser; born 7 June 1998) is a German professional pool player from Stolberg. Filler has been successful on the Euro Tour, reaching the semi-final of the 2018 Portugal Open. She would lose 7–3 to Marharyta Fefilava in the semi-final.

Pia is married to 2018 WPA World Nine-ball Championship winner Joshua Filler.

== Titles & Achievements ==
- 2026 Predator Saigon Women’s 9-Ball Open
- 2026 Euro Tour Italian Open
- 2026 Euro Tour Luxembourg Open
- 2026 Predator Mixed Doubles Turbo Open
- 2025 Box Billiards Mixed Doubles Open
- 2025 Euro Tour Austrian Open
- 2025 European Pool Championship 9-Ball
- 2025 European Pool Championship Straight Pool
- 2024 Euro Tour Tallinn Open
- 2024 European Pool Championship Straight Pool
- 2024 European Pool Championship 10-Ball
- 2024 European Pool Championship 9-Ball
- 2023 WPA World Mixed Teams Ten-ball Championship
- 2023 European Pool Championship 9-Ball
- 2022 Euro Tour Treviso Open
- 2022 European Pool Championship 8-Ball
