= Konrad Juszczyszyn =

Polish pool player

Personal information
- Nickname: "Kinder"
- Born: 28 November 1993 (age 32) Lubin, Poland

Pool career
- Country: Poland
- Pool games: 9-Ball
- Current rank: 18

Konrad Juszczyszyn (born 28 November 1993) is a Polish professional pool player. Juszczyszyn won the 9-Ball event at the 2018 European Pool Championship. Juszczyszyn is also a runner-up on the Euro Tour, reaching the final of the 2015 German Open, losing in the final to Petri Makkonen 3–9. Juszczyszyn later won the 2019 Treviso Open, defeating Ivar Saris in the final 6–9.

== Titles & achievements ==
- 2025 European Pool Championships 10-ball
- 2023 Pro Billiard Series Puerto Rico Open
- 2021 Polish Amateur Snooker Championship
- 2019 Euro Tour Treviso Open
- 2018 European Pool Championship Nine-Ball
- 2017 American Straight Pool Championship
- 2016 Polish Pool Championship Nine-Ball
- 2015 Polish Pool Championship Nine-Ball
