= Tina Vogelmann =

German pool player, born 1985

Tina Vogelmann (born 24 March 1985) is a German professional pool player.

== Career ==
She began playing pool at age 17. From 2002 to 2004, she was part of the youth performance squad. In 2004, she completed her training as a C-trainer. Since the summer of 2004, she has played at BSF Kurpfalz and has been a member of the women's performance squad. In 2008, she was inducted into the German national team.

Since 2007, Tina Vogelmann has won several national titles and participated in international competitions. So she reached the fifth place in the German Championship 2007 in the Women's Combined Team, the third place in the 8-Ball ladies singles and eventually won the German championship in the 9-Ball event.

Vogelmann reached her first semi-final of an event on the Euro Tour, at the 2017 Austria Open. She reached the semi-final again at the 2019 Veldhoven Open. At the next event, the 2019 Antalya Open, she reached the final, losing to Oliwia Zalewska 6–7.

== Titles ==
- 2023 European Pool Championship Straight Pool
- 2023 European Pool Championship 8-ball
