= Sylvia Buschhüter =

German pool player

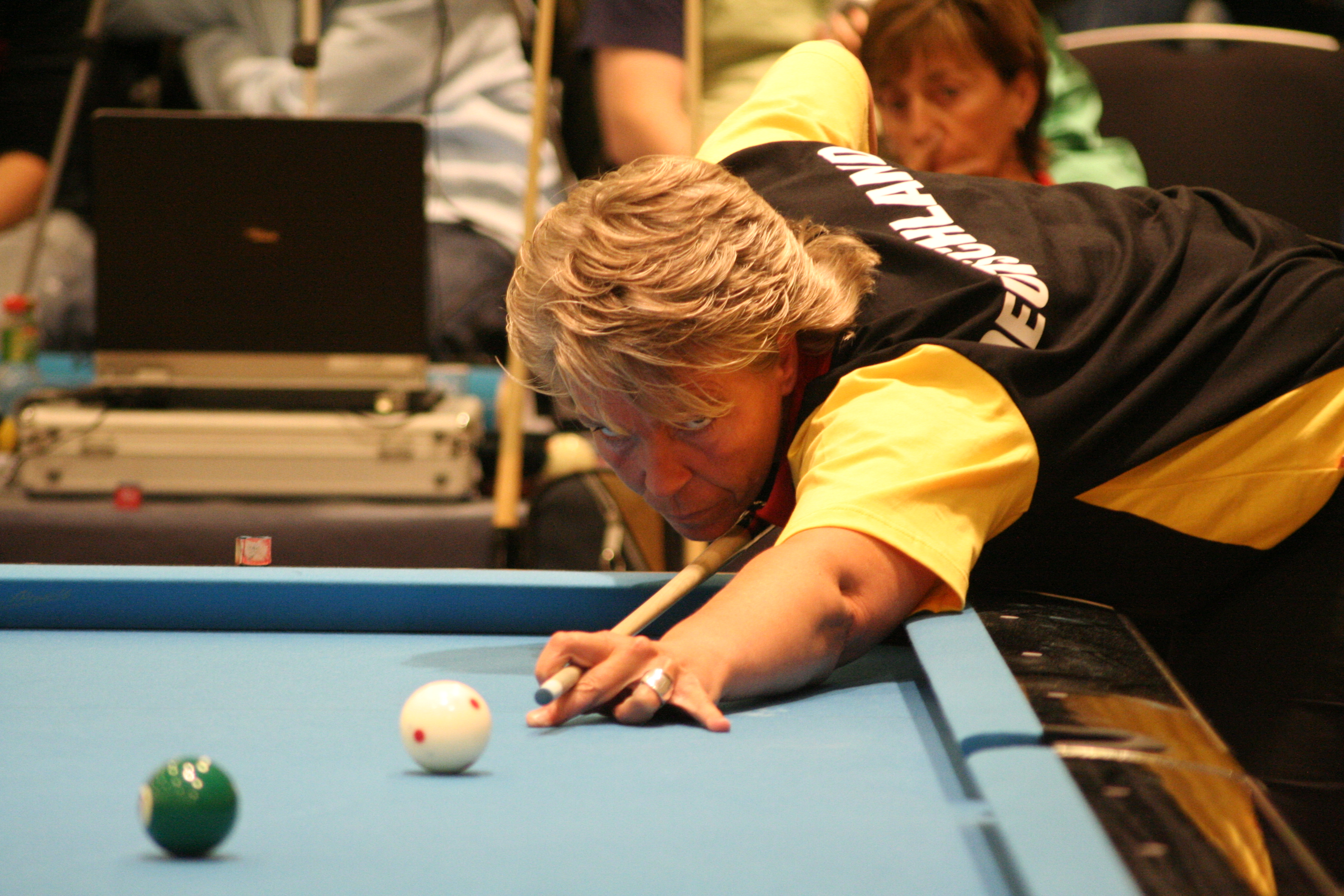

Personal information
- Born: 3 December 1962 (age 63)

Pool career
- Turned pro: 1979
- Pool games: straight pool

Sylvia Buschhüter is a former professional pool player from Germany. She is a three-time European Pool Championships winner, and six-time German national champion.

Buschhutter won a total of six national titles, beginning in 1984, winning a total of three straight pool titles, and one each in 8-ball, 9-ball and the cup event.

== Career titles and achievements ==
- 1997 European Pool Championship 9-ball
- 1991 European Pool Championship 8-ball
- 1984 European Pool Championship 8-ball
