= Ivar Saris =

Dutch professional pool player (born 1993)

Personal information
- Born: 14 July 1993 (age 32)

Pool career
- Country: Netherlands
- Best finish: Runner-up 2019 Treviso Open

Ivar Saris (born 14 July 1993) is a Dutch professional pool player. Saris is a regular player on the Euro Tour, finishing as runner-up at the 2019 Treviso Open, where he lost to Konrad Juszczyszyn in the final 9–6.

Saris made his first appearance at a world championship at the youth WPA World Nine-ball Championship, where he won three matches before losing to Mieszko Fortuński. Saris is a three time medalist at the youth European Pool Championships, winning the ten-ball event, and runner-up in straight pool in 2008.
