= Nine-ball at the 2009 World Games – men's singles =

Nine-ball men's singles at the 2009 World Games
- Venue: Chung Cheng Martial Arts Stadium, Kaohsiung, Taiwan
- Dates: 22–26 July 2009
- Competitors: 16 from 14 nations

Medalists
gold medal	(Germany) Ralf Souquet
silver medal	(Chinese Taipei) Yang Ching-shun
bronze medal	(France) Stephan Cohen

The men's singles nine-ball competition at the 2009 World Games took place from 22 to 26 July 2009 at the Chung Cheng Martial Arts Stadium in Kaohsiung, Taiwan.

== Last 16 ==
David Reljic (Australia)	6–11	(Germany) Ralf Souquet
Young-Hwa Jeong (South Korea)	8–11	(Philippines) Leonardo Didal
Satoshi Kawabata (Japan)	8–11	(France) Stephan Cohen
Jason Theron (South Africa)	6–11	(Italy) Bruno Muratore
Marcus Chamat (Sweden)	11–8	(Chile) Alejandro Carvajal
Ivica Putnik (Croatia)	2–11	(Chinese Taipei) Yang Ching-shun
Thorsten Hohmann (Germany)	11–4	(Vietnam) Lương Chí Dũng
Kuo Po-cheng (Chinese Taipei)	10–11	(United States) Shane Van Boening

== Last 8 ==
Quarter-finals
(Germany) Ralf Souquet	11
(Philippines) Leonardo Didal	10
(France) Stephan Cohen	11
(Italy) Bruno Muratore	4
(Sweden) Marcus Chamat	9
(Chinese Taipei) Yang Ching-shun	11
(Germany) Thorsten Hohmann	11
(United States) Shane Van Boening	5

Semi-finals
(Germany) Ralf Souquet	11
(France) Stephan Cohen	6
(Chinese Taipei) Yang Ching-shun	11
(Germany) Thorsten Hohmann	10

Gold medal match
(Germany) Ralf Souquet	11
(Chinese Taipei) Yang Ching-shun	4
Bronze medal match
(France) Stephan Cohen	11
(Germany) Thorsten Hohmann	6
