= European Pool Championships =

Annual pool competition

European Pool Championship (also called Dynamic European Championships) is a pool competition organized by the European Pocket Billiard Federation (EPBF). The tournament is held annually since 1980. It should not be confused with the series of smaller events known as the Euro Tour, also run by the EPBF.

Current disciplines include Eight-ball, Nine-Ball, Ten-Ball, Straight pool, and team events), and for different age and ability ranges, with events for men, women, juniors and wheelchair players.

== Tournament history ==
=== Men ===
Year	Location	Eight-ball		Nine-ball		Straight pool		Ten-ball	
Year	Location	Winner	Runner-up	Winner	Runner-up	Winner	Runner-up	Winner	Runner-up
1980	(Germany) Alsdorf	(Sweden) Bengt Jonasson	(Sweden) Sven Olaf Olsson	–	–	(Sweden) Tomy Eriksson	(Germany) Norbert Spaniol	–	–
1981	(Switzerland) Bern	(Sweden) Sven Olaf Olsson	(Germany) Günter Geisen	–	–	(Sweden) Jurgen Karlsson	(Sweden) Tomy Eriksson	–	–
1982	(Sweden) Gothenburg	(Sweden) Bengt Jonasson	(Sweden) Björn Jonsson	–	–	(Sweden) Ulf Hjalmvall	(Sweden) Jurgen Karlsson	–	–
1983	(Netherlands) Valkenburg	(Sweden) Sven Olaf Olsson	(Sweden) Bengt Jonasson	–	–	(Norway) Bjørn L'Orange	(Sweden) Björn Jonsson	–	–
1984	(England) London	(Sweden) Björn Jonsson	(Sweden) Ulf Hjalmvall	–	–	(Sweden) Bengt Pedersen	(Germany) Bruno Ernst	–	–
1985	(Austria) St. Johann	(Sweden) Björn Jonsson	(Sweden) Mikael Hallgren	(Sweden) Ulf Hjalmvall	(Germany) Uwe Sander	(Sweden) Jurgen Karlsson	(Sweden) Bengt Pedersen	–	–
1986	(Norway) Oslo	(Sweden) Björn Jonsson	(Sweden) Tom Storm	(Norway) Bjørn L'Orange	(Sweden) Dan Johansson	(Germany) Norbert Lang	(Sweden) Jurgen Karlsson	–	–
1987	(Germany) Stolberg	(Sweden) Ulf Hjalmvall	(Sweden) Björn Jonsson	(Sweden) Tom Storm	(Germany) Uwe Sander	(Germany) Oliver Ortmann	(Germany) Thomas Engert	–	–
1988	(Sweden) Stockholm	(Sweden) Mikael Hallgren	(Germany) Thomas Engert	(Sweden) Tom Storm	(Sweden) Christer Lofstrand	(Sweden) Per Anda	(Germany) Bernd Hoffman	–	–
1989	(Liechtenstein) Schaan	(Germany) Ralf Souquet	(Sweden) Mikael Hallgren	(Germany) Thomas Engert	(Sweden) Tom Storm	(Germany) Oliver Ortmann	(Sweden) Per Anda	–	–
1990	(Switzerland) St. Moritz	(Sweden) Tom Storm	(Germany) Ralf Souquet	(Germany) Thomas Engert	(Sweden) Mikael Hallgren	(Germany) Oliver Ortmann	(Germany) Waldemar Markert	–	–
1991	(Italy) Mussolente	(Germany) David Shaw	(Sweden) Tom Storm	(Germany) Thomas Engert	(Germany) Tony Deigner	(Sweden) Jan Lundell	(Germany) Oliver Ortmann	–	–
1992	(Slovenia) Ljubljana (Austria) Velden	(Germany) Ralf Souquet	(Norway) Trond Larsen	(Austria) Werner Duregger	(Belgium) Mario Lannoye	(Sweden) Niklas Bergendorff	(Germany) Ralf Souquet	–	–
1993	(Hungary) Siófok (Norway) Oslo	(Germany) Ralf Souquet	(Germany) Thomas Engert	(Germany) Oliver Ortmann	(Germany) Ralf Souquet	(Germany) Thomas Engert	(Germany) Ralf Souquet	–	–
1994	(France) Annecy (Finland) Tampere	(Germany) Ralf Souquet	(Germany) Thomas Engert	(Germany) Oliver Ortmann	(Sweden) Bengt Jonasson	(Germany) Thomas Engert	(Sweden) Niklas Bergendorff	–	–
1995	(Belgium) Antwerp	(Germany) Ralf Souquet	(Denmark) Peter Nielsen	(Germany) Ralf Souquet	(Germany) Oliver Ortmann	(Germany) Ralf Souquet	(Germany) Rolf Alex	–	–
1996	(Hungary) Békéscsaba	(Germany) Oliver Ortmann	(Germany) Ralf Souquet	(Germany) Oliver Ortmann	(Germany) Thomas Engert	(Germany) Ralf Souquet	(Germany) Oliver Ortmann	–	–
1997	(Norway) Stavanger	(Germany) Bernd Jahnke	(Germany) Ralf Souquet	(Germany) Ralf Souquet	(Germany) Bernd Jahnke	(Germany) Ralf Souquet	(Germany) Oliver Ortmann	–	–
1998	Luxembourg	(Germany) Ralf Souquet	(Netherlands) Rico Diks	(Germany) Ralf Souquet	(Italy) Fabio Petroni	(Finland) Mika Immonen	(Germany) Ralf Souquet	–	–
1999	(Poland) Poznań	(Germany) Ralf Souquet	(Denmark) Peter Nielsen	(Germany) Oliver Ortmann	(Switzerland) Samuel Clemann	(Sweden) Tom Storm	(Germany) Oliver Ortmann	–	–
2000	(Austria) Bregenz	(Germany) Ralf Souquet	(Germany) Thomas Engert	(Sweden) Marcus Chamat	(Germany) Ralf Souquet	(Germany) Oliver Ortmann	(Netherlands) Alex Lely	–	–
2001	(Czech Republic) Karlovy Vary	(Sweden) Niklas Bergendorff	(Netherlands) Nick van den Berg	(Netherlands) Rico Diks	(Germany) Andreas Roschkowsky	(Germany) Thomas Engert	(Netherlands) Nick van den Berg	–	–
2002	(Finland) Tampere	(Serbia) Šandor Tot	(France) Stephan Cohen	(Germany) Oliver Ortmann	(Switzerland) Sascha Specchia	(Netherlands) Niels Feijen	(France) Stephan Cohen	–	–
2003	(Poland) Białystok	(Germany) Ralf Souquet	(Sweden) Tom Storm	(Germany) Oliver Ortmann	(Austria) Alexander Markut	(Netherlands) Niels Feijen	(Sweden) Tom Storm	–	–
2004	(Czech Republic) Prague	(Germany) Thorsten Hohmann	(Netherlands) Niels Feijen	(Germany) Thomas Engert	(Germany) Ralf Souquet	(Netherlands) Niels Feijen	(Germany) Thomas Engert	–	–
2005	(Netherlands) Veldhoven	(Netherlands) Alex Lely	(Poland) Tomasz Kapłan	(Netherlands) Alex Lely	(Germany) Ralf Souquet	(Germany) Thorsten Hohmann	(Germany) Nicolas Ottermann	–	–
2006	(Germany) Brandenburg	(Germany) Oliver Ortmann	(Finland) Aki Heiskanen	(Germany) Ralf Souquet	(Switzerland) Marco Tschudi	(Germany) Oliver Ortmann	(Germany) Ralf Souquet	–	–
2007	(Czech Republic) Liberec	(Germany) Oliver Ortmann	(Malta) Tony Drago	(Germany) Thorsten Hohmann	(Poland) Radosław Babica	(Netherlands) Niels Feijen	(Russia) Konstantin Stepanov	–	–
2008	(Germany) Willingen	(Sweden) Marcus Chamat	(Serbia) Zoran Svilar	(France) Stephan Cohen	(Serbia) Zoran Svilar	(Croatia) Ivica Putnik	(Germany) Ralf Souquet	–	–
2009	(Austria) St. Johann	(Germany) Andreas Roschkowsky	(Greece) Nikos Ekonomopoulos	(Netherlands) Nick van den Berg	(Russia) Ruslan Chinakhov	(Switzerland) Dimitri Jungo	(Netherlands) Niels Feijen	–	–
2010	(Croatia) Zagreb	(Russia) Konstantin Stepanov	(Sweden) Marcus Chamat	(Germany) Ralf Souquet	(Poland) Mateusz Śniegocki	(Spain) David Alcaide	(Ukraine) Artem Koshovyi	(Germany) Ralf Souquet	(Netherlands) Niels Feijen
2011	(Germany) Brandenburg	(Germany) Dominic Jentsch	(Germany) Ralf Souquet	(Netherlands) Nick van den Berg	(Austria) Mario He	(Poland) Tomasz Kapłan	(Italy) Fabio Petroni	(France) Stephan Cohen	(Poland) Radosław Babica
2012	Luxembourg	(Austria) Mario He	(Ukraine) Artem Koshovyi	(Spain) Francisco Díaz-Pizarro	(Sweden) Marcus Chamat	(Netherlands) Nick van den Berg	(Netherlands) Niels Feijen	(Germany) Dominic Jentsch	(France) Stephan Cohen
2013	(Slovenia) Portorož	(Spain) David Alcaide	(Sweden) Jim Chawki	(Netherlands) Niels Feijen	(Serbia) Zoran Svilar	(Netherlands) Nick van den Berg	(Poland) Tomasz Kapłan	(Poland) Mateusz Śniegocki	(Russia) Konstantin Stepanov
2014	(Cyprus) Kyrenia	(Netherlands) Nick van den Berg	(Slovakia) Jakub Koniar	(Netherlands) Niels Feijen	(Austria) Jürgen Jenisy	(Netherlands) Niels Feijen	(Netherlands) Nick van den Berg	(Spain) David Alcaide	(Netherlands) Ivo Aarts
2015	(Portugal) Vale do Lobo	(Netherlands) Niels Feijen	(Poland) Karol Skowerski	(Spain) Francisco Díaz-Pizarro	(Poland) Karol Skowerski	(Netherlands) Nick van den Berg	(Netherlands) Niels Feijen	(Greece) Alexander Kazakis	(Spain) Francisco Díaz-Pizarro
2016	(Austria) St. Johann	(Ukraine) Vitaliy Patsura	(Spain) Francisco Sánchez Ruiz	(Spain) Francisco Sánchez Ruiz	(Germany) Joshua Filler	(Austria) Albin Ouschan	(Russia) Konstantin Stepanov	(Spain) David Alcaide	(Finland) Petri Makkonen
2017	(Portugal) Albufeira	(Finland) Jani Uski	(Netherlands) Marc Bijsterbosch	(Russia) Ruslan Chinakhov	(Switzerland) Ronald Regli	(Netherlands) Niels Feijen	(Poland) Tomasz Kapłan	(Netherlands) Marc Bijsterbosch	(Sweden) Christian Sparrenlöv
2018	(Netherlands) Veldhoven	(Denmark) Bahram Lotfy	(Poland) Konrad Juszczyszyn	(Poland) Konrad Juszczyszyn	(Bulgaria) Stanimir Ruslanov	(Netherlands) Niels Feijen	(Austria) Albin Ouschan	(Germany) Joshua Filler	(Austria) Albin Ouschan
2019	(Italy) Treviso	(Albania) Eklent Kaçi	(Germany) Ralf Souquet	(Russia) Fedor Gorst	(Germany) Joshua Filler	(Poland) Karol Skowerski	(Poland) Tomasz Kapłan	(Poland) Mieszko Fortuński	(Finland) Casper Matikainen
2020	Cancelled due to COVID-19 in Turkey								
2021	(Turkey) Antalya	(Austria) Mario He	(Russia) Fedor Gorst	(Germany) Joshua Filler	(Bosnia and Herzegovina) Sanjin Pehlivanović	(Russia) Fedor Gorst	(Netherlands) Marc Bijsterbosch	(Poland) Mieszko Fortuński	(Poland) Daniel Macioł
2022	(Slovenia) Laško	(Germany) Ralf Souquet	(Austria) Mario He	(Netherlands) Niels Feijen	(Austria) Daniel Guttenberger	(Germany) Joshua Filler	(Czech Republic) Roman Hybler	(Bosnia and Herzegovina) Sanjin Pehlivanović	(Poland) Wojciech Szewczyk
2023	(Finland) Tampere	(Germany) Dennis Laszkowski	(Poland) Mateusz Śniegocki	(Poland) Wojciech Szewczyk	(Spain) Francisco Díaz-Pizarro	(Finland) Kim Laaksonen	(Netherlands) Yannick Pongers	(Switzerland) Ronald Regli	(Germany) Stefan Kasper
2024	(Slovenia) Podčetrtek	(Spain) Francisco Sánchez Ruiz	(Austria) Mario He	(Austria) Mario He	(Germany) Luca Menn	(Netherlands) Niels Feijen	(Germany) Joshua Filler	(Hungary) Olivér Szolnoki	(Netherlands) Niels Feijen
2025	(Estonia) Tallinn	(Germany) Stefan Kasper	(Poland) Wojciech Szewczyk	(Finland) Casper Matikainen	(Poland) Daniel Macioł	(Germany) Tobias Bongers	(Poland) Mateusz Śniegocki	(Poland) Konrad Juszczyszyn	(Germany) Stefan Kasper
2026	(Turkey) Antalya	(Spain) Juan Carlos Expósito	(Norway) Emil André Gangfløt	(Poland) Daniel Macioł	(Spain) Jonás Souto	(Germany) Stefan Kasper	(Germany) Yuma Dörner	(Poland) Daniel Macioł	(Slovakia) Jakub Koniar

=== Women ===
Year	Location	Eight-ball		Nine-ball		Straight pool		Ten-ball	
Year	Location	Winner	Runner-up	Winner	Runner-up	Winner	Runner-up	Winner	Runner-up
1981	(Switzerland) Bern	(Germany) Klara Lensing	(Sweden) Eva Eleholt	–	–	(Sweden) Ewa Svensson	(Germany) Giesela Wohlwender	–	–
1982	(Sweden) Gothenburg	(Germany) Klara Lensing	(Sweden) Louise Furberg	–	–	(Sweden) Eva Eleholt	(Sweden) Anke Cronquist	–	–
1983	(Netherlands) Valkenburg	(Germany) Klara Lensing	(Sweden) Anke Cronquist	–	–	(Sweden) Heide Andersson	(Sweden) Eva Eleholt	–	–
1984	(England) London	(Germany) Sylvia Buschhüter	(Germany) Klara Lensing	–	–	(Sweden) Eva Eleholt	(Germany) Franziska Stark	–	–
1985	(Austria) St. Johann	(Sweden) Anke Cronquist	(Germany) Margit Schlosser	(Sweden) Heide Andersson	(England) Hazel Dabrowski	(Sweden) Eva Eleholt	(Sweden) Marie Thorné	–	–
1986	(Norway) Oslo	(Sweden) Anke Cronquist	(Liechtenstein) Doris Riesch	(Sweden) Helena Thornfeldt	(Sweden) Heide Andersson	(Germany) Franziska Stark	(Sweden) Louise Furberg	–	–
1987	(Germany) Stolberg	(Germany) Birgitt Hermann	(Sweden) Christina Lilja	(Sweden) Helena Thornfeldt	(Sweden) Heide Andersson	(Sweden) Louise Furberg	(Germany) Franziska Stark	–	–
1988	(Sweden) Stockholm	(Germany) Klara Lensing	(Sweden) Anette Aronsson	(Germany) Franziska Stark	(Sweden) Helena Thornfeldt	(Sweden) Louise Furberg	(Germany) Sylvia Buschhüter	–	–
1989	(Liechtenstein) Schaan	(Austria) Gerda Hofstätter	(Switzerland) Jacqueline von Kanel	(Germany) Franziska Stark	(Sweden) Helena Thornfeldt	(Sweden) Louise Furberg	(Germany) Sylvia Buschhüter	–	–
1990	(Switzerland) St. Moritz	(Germany) Ilona Bernhard	(Switzerland) Jacqueline von Kanel	(Germany) Franziska Stark	(Germany) Klara Lensing	(Sweden) Louise Furberg	(Germany) Andrea Kroll	–	–
1991	(Italy) Mussolente	(Germany) Sylvia Buschhüter	(Germany) Ilona Bernhard	(Sweden) Louise Furberg	(Germany) Franziska Stark	(Sweden) Helena Thornfeldt	(Germany) Andrea Kroll	–	–
1992	(Slovenia) Ljubljana (Austria) Velden	(Sweden) Louise Furberg	(Germany) Ilona Bernhard	(Germany) Franziska Stark	(Norway) Vibeke Havre	(Sweden) Helena Thornfeldt	(Germany) Ilona Bernhard	–	–
1993	(Hungary) Siófok (Norway) Oslo	(Austria) Gerda Hofstätter	(Sweden) Louise Furberg	(Austria) Gerda Hofstätter	(Germany) Franziska Stark	(Germany) Franziska Stark	(Austria) Gerda Hofstätter	–	–
1994	(France) Annecy (Finland) Tampere	(Germany) Ilona Bernhard	(Germany) Karin Mayet	(Germany) Franziska Stark	(Austria) Gerda Hofstätter	(Sweden) Helena Thornfeldt	(Austria) Gerda Hofstätter	–	–
1995	(Belgium) Antwerp	(Germany) Ilona Bernhard	(Germany) Monja Kielhorn	(Austria) Gerda Hofstätter	(Germany) Franziska Stark	(Austria) Gerda Hofstätter	(Germany) Monja Kielhorn	–	–
1996	(Hungary) Békéscsaba	(Germany) Franziska Stark	(Germany) Monja Kielhorn	(Switzerland) Sabina Dedering	(Germany) Franziska Stark	(Germany) Monja Kielhorn	(Germany) Franziska Stark	–	–
1997	(Norway) Stavanger	(Austria) Gerda Hofstätter	(Italy) Anita Rizutti	(Germany) Sylvia Buschhüter	(Norway) Line Kjørsvik	(Austria) Gerda Hofstätter	(Germany) Franziska Stark	–	–
1998	Luxembourg	(Germany) Ilona Bernhard	(Northern Ireland) Karen Corr	(England) Allison Fisher	(Switzerland) Julia Rechfeld	(England) Allison Fisher	(Germany) Franziska Stark	–	–
1999	(Poland) Poznań	(Germany) Franziska Stark	(Sweden) Louise Furberg	(Germany) Daniela Husseneder	(Germany) Silke Falkus	(Germany) Franziska Stark	(Sweden) Ulrika Andersson	–	–
2000	(Austria) Bregenz	(Germany) Franziska Stark	(Germany) Karin Mayet	(Germany) Karin Mayet	(Norway) Line Kjørsvik	(Sweden) Christina Niklasson	(Germany) Franziska Stark	–	–
2001	(Czech Republic) Brno	(Austria) Gerda Hofstätter	(Germany) Karin Mayet	(Germany) Karin Mayet	(Sweden) Ulrika Andersson	(Norway) Line Kjørsvik	(Germany) Franziska Stark	–	–
2002	(Finland) Tampere	(Sweden) Louise Furberg	(Norway) Line Kjørsvik	(Germany) Sandra Ortner	(Italy) Tiziana Cacciamani	(Sweden) Ulrika Andersson	(Germany) Sandra Ortner	–	–
2003	(Poland) Białystok	(Denmark) Charlotte Sørensen	(Germany) Franziska Stark	(Germany) Sandra Ortner	(Sweden) Louise Furberg	(Germany) Sandra Ortner	(Norway) Line Kjørsvik	–	–
2004	(Czech Republic) Prague	(Norway) Line Kjørsvik	(Denmark) Charlotte Sørensen	(France) Laëtitia Dos Santos	(Sweden) Ulrika Andersson	(Norway) Line Kjørsvik	(Germany) Daniela Benz	–	–
2005	(Netherlands) Veldhoven	(Switzerland) Christine Naeff	(Belgium) Wendy Jans	(Austria) Jasmin Ouschan	(Denmark) Charlotte Sørensen	(Austria) Jasmin Ouschan	(Germany) Diana Stateczny	–	–
2006	(Germany) Brandenburg	(Austria) Jasmin Ouschan	(Germany) Daniela Benz	(Norway) Line Kjørsvik	(Denmark) Katrine Jensen	(Austria) Jasmin Ouschan	(Germany) Janine Schwan	–	–
2007	(Czech Republic) Liberec	(Germany) Diana Stateczny	(Denmark) Charlotte Sørensen	(Turkey) Eylül Kibaroğlu	(Norway) Line Kjørsvik	(Austria) Jasmin Ouschan	(Austria) Sabrina Naverschnig	–	–
2008	(Germany) Willingen	(Austria) Jasmin Ouschan	(Norway) Line Kjørsvik	(Switzerland) Sabina Dederding	(Netherlands) Estelle Bijnen	(Denmark) Charlotte Sørensen	(Norway) Line Kjørsvik	–	–
2009	(Austria) St. Johann	(Austria) Jasmin Ouschan	(Germany) Janine Schwan	(Austria) Jasmin Ouschan	(Czech Republic) Veronika Hubrtová	(Austria) Gerda Hofstätter	(Austria) Jasmin Ouschan	–	–
2010	(Croatia) Zagreb	(Austria) Jasmin Ouschan	(Norway) Line Kjørsvik	(Austria) Jasmin Ouschan	(Austria) Gerda Hofstätter	(Austria) Jasmin Ouschan	(Austria) Gerda Hofstätter	(Austria) Jasmin Ouschan	(Germany) Ina Jentschura
2011	(Germany) Brandenburg	(Netherlands) Kynthia Orfanidis	(Finland) Marika Poikkijoki	(Austria) Jasmin Ouschan	(Austria) Gerda Hofstätter	(Austria) Jasmin Ouschan	(Norway) Line Kjørsvik	(Austria) Jasmin Ouschan	(Russia) Natalia Seroshtan
2012	Luxembourg	(Russia) Natalia Seroshtan	(Finland) Marika Poikkijoki	(Finland) Marika Poikkijoki	(Germany) Jasmin Michel	(Norway) Line Kjørsvik	(Russia) Anna Maschirina	(Austria) Jasmin Ouschan	(Russia) Natalia Seroshtan
2013	(Slovenia) Portorož	(Norway) Line Kjørsvik	(Finland) Marika Poikkijoki	(Austria) Jasmin Ouschan	(Norway) Line Kjørsvik	(Poland) Oliwia Zalewska	(Finland) Marika Poikkijoki	(Austria) Jasmin Ouschan	(Poland) Katarzyna Wesołowska
2014	(Cyprus) Kyrenia	(Russia) Daria Sirotina	(Belgium) Kamila Khodjaeva	(Austria) Jasmin Ouschan	(Norway) Line Kjørsvik	(Austria) Jasmin Ouschan	(Poland) Oliwia Zalewska	(Poland) Katarzyna Wesołowska	(Germany) Ina Kaplan
2015	(Portugal) Vale do Lobo	(Sweden) Caroline Roos	(Norway) Line Kjørsvik	(Austria) Jasmin Ouschan	(Belgium) Kamila Khodjaeva	(Austria) Jasmin Ouschan	(Belgium) Kamila Khodjaeva	(Belgium) Kamila Khodjaeva	(Austria) Jasmin Ouschan
2016	(Austria) St. Johann	(Russia) Kristina Tkach	(Ukraine) Kateryna Polovinchuk	(Belgium) Kamila Khodjaeva	(Germany) Ina Kaplan	(Austria) Jasmin Ouschan	(Poland) Oliwia Zalewska	(Austria) Jasmin Ouschan	(Norway) Line Kjørsvik
2017	(Portugal) Albufeira	(Austria) Jasmin Ouschan	(Germany) Melanie Süßenguth	(England) Kelly Fisher	(Russia) Natalia Seroshtan	(Russia) Kristina Tkach	(Austria) Jasmin Ouschan	(Spain) Amalia Matas	(Slovenia) Ana Gradišnik
2018	(Netherlands) Veldhoven	(Germany) Veronika Ivanovskaia	(Netherlands) Tamara Peeters	(England) Kelly Fisher	(Austria) Jasmin Ouschan	(Austria) Jasmin Ouschan	(Russia) Kristina Tkach	(Belarus) Jana Schut	(Austria) Jasmin Ouschan
2019	(Italy) Treviso	(Russia) Kristina Tkach	(Austria) Jasmin Ouschan	(Austria) Jasmin Ouschan	(Russia) Natalia Seroshtan	(Russia) Kristina Tkach	(Netherlands) Tamara Peeters	(Switzerland) Christine Feldmann	(Russia) Kristina Tkach
2020	Cancelled due to COVID-19 in Turkey								
2021	(Turkey) Antalya	(Poland) Oliwia Zalewska	(Belarus) Marharyta Fefilava	(Belarus) Marharyta Fefilava	(Germany) Veronika Ivanovskaia	(Germany) Ina Kaplan	(Spain) Amalia Matas	(Turkey) Eylül Kibaroğlu	(Netherlands) Tamara Rademakers
2022	(Slovenia) Laško	(Germany) Pia Filler	(Slovenia) Ana Gradišnik	(Poland) Oliwia Zalewska	(Slovenia) Ana Gradišnik	(Spain) Amalia Matas	(Germany) Pia Filler	(Turkey) Eylül Kibaroğlu	(Germany) Ina Kaplan
2023	(Finland) Tampere	(Germany) Tina Vogelmann	(Poland) Oliwia Zalewska	(Germany) Pia Filler	(Slovenia) Ana Gradišnik	(Germany) Tina Vogelmann	(Turkey) Eylül Kibaroğlu	(Germany) Veronika Ivanovskaia	(Germany) Pia Filler
2024	(Slovenia) Podčetrtek	(Slovenia) Ana Gradišnik	(Ukraine) Darya Siranchuk	(Germany) Pia Filler	(Poland) Oliwia Zalewska	(Germany) Pia Filler	(Austria) Lena Primus	(Germany) Pia Filler	(Spain) Mayte Ropero
2025	(Estonia) Tallinn	(Austria) Jasmin Ouschan	(Germany) Pia Filler	(Germany) Pia Filler	(Germany) Ina Kaplan	(Germany) Pia Filler	(Germany) Ina Kaplan	(Northern Cyprus) Alara Ghaffari	(Portugal) Sara Rocha
2026	(Turkey) Antalya	(Austria) Jasmin Ouschan	(Spain) Mayte Ropero	(Germany) Ina Kaplan	(Germany) Johanna Indlekofer	(Sweden) Linnéa Hjalmarström	(Germany) Ina Kaplan	(Germany) Ina Kaplan	(Poland) Oliwia Zalewska

=== Wheelchair ===
Year	Location	Eight-ball		Nine-ball		Ten-ball	
Year	Location	Winner	Runner-up	Winner	Runner-up	Winner	Runner-up
1999	(Poland) Poznań	(Sweden) Henrik Larsson	(Austria) Emil Schranz	(Belgium) Kurt Deklerck	(Germany) Tankred Volkmer	–	–
2000	(Austria) Bregenz	(Belgium) Kurt Deklerck	(Sweden) Henrik Larsson	(Sweden) Henrik Larsson	(Belgium) Kurt Deklerck	–	–
2001	(Czech Republic) Karlovy Vary	(England) Daniel Luton	(Belgium) Kurt Deklerck	(Sweden) Henrik Larsson	(Belgium) Kurt Deklerck	–	–
2002	(Finland) Tampere	(Finland) Jouni Tähti	(Sweden) Henrik Larsson	(Sweden) Henrik Larsson	(Finland) Jouni Tähti	–	–
2003	(Poland) Białystok	(Finland) Jouni Tähti	(Sweden) Henrik Larsson	(Finland) Jouni Tähti	(Belgium) Kurt Deklerck	–	–
2004	(Czech Republic) Prague	(Sweden) Henrik Larsson	(Finland) Jouni Tähti	(Republic of Ireland) Fred Dinsmore	(Sweden) Henrik Larsson	–	–
2005	(Netherlands) Veldhoven	(Finland) Jouni Tähti	(Sweden) Henrik Larsson	(Sweden) Henrik Larsson	(Finland) Jouni Tähti	–	–
2006	(Germany) Brandenburg	(Finland) Jouni Tähti	(Sweden) Henrik Larsson	(England) Roy Kimberley	(Finland) Matt Duffy	–	–
2007	(Czech Republic) Liberec	(England) Daniel Luton	(Sweden) Henrik Larsson	(England) Roy Kimberley	(Sweden) Henrik Larsson	–	–
2008	(Germany) Willingen	(England) Karl Read	(Sweden) Henrik Larsson	(Finland) Jouni Tähti	(Austria) Emil Schranz	–	–
2009	(Austria) St. Johann	(Finland) Jouni Tähti	(England) Tony Southern	(Finland) Jouni Tähti	(England) Roy Kimberley	–	–
2010	(Croatia) Zagreb	(Belgium) Kurt Deklerck	(Sweden) Henrik Larsson	(Finland) Jouni Tähti	(Sweden) Henrik Larsson	(Finland) Jouni Tähti	(England) Roy Kimberley
2011	(Germany) Brandenburg	(Finland) Jouni Tähti	(Belgium) Kurt Deklerck	(Sweden) Henrik Larsson	(Finland) Jouni Tähti	(Finland) Jouni Tähti	(Sweden) Henrik Larsson
2012	Luxembourg	(Finland) Jouni Tähti	(England) Roy Kimberley	(Finland) Jouni Tähti	(England) Daniel Luton	(England) Daniel Luton	(Republic of Ireland) Fred Dinsmore
2013	(Slovenia) Portorož	(Republic of Ireland) Fred Dinsmore	(Sweden) Henrik Larsson	(Republic of Ireland) Fred Dinsmore	(England) Tony Southern	(Belgium) Kurt Deklerck	(England) Roy Kimberley
2014	(Cyprus) Kyrenia	(Finland) Jouni Tähti	(Sweden) Henrik Larsson	(Finland) Jouni Tähti	(Republic of Ireland) Fred Dinsmore	(Republic of Ireland) Fred Dinsmore	(England) Roy Kimberley
2015	(Portugal) Vale do Lobo	(Republic of Ireland) Fred Dinsmore	(England) Daniel Luton	(Finland) Jouni Tähti	(England) Tony Southern	(Finland) Jouni Tähti	(Belgium) Kurt Deklerck
2016	(Austria) St. Johann	(Sweden) Henrik Larsson	(England) Tony Southern	(Sweden) Henrik Larsson	(Belgium) Kurt Deklerck	(Finland) Jouni Tähti	(Belgium) Kurt Deklerck
2017	(Portugal) Albufeira	(Finland) Jouni Tähti	(Belgium) Kurt Deklerck	(Finland) Jouni Tähti	(Sweden) Henrik Larsson	(Belgium) Kurt Deklerck	(England) Roy Kimberley
2018	(Netherlands) Veldhoven	(Finland) Jouni Tähti	(Sweden) Henrik Larsson	(Finland) Jouni Tähti	(Republic of Ireland) Fred Dinsmore	(Finland) Jouni Tähti	(England) Roy Kimberley
2019	(Italy) Treviso	(Finland) Jouni Tähti	(England) Roy Kimberley	(Finland) Jouni Tähti	(Republic of Ireland) Fred Dinsmore	(Sweden) Henrik Larsson	(Latvia) Kaspars Turks
2020	Cancelled due to COVID-19 in Turkey						
2021	(Turkey) Antalya	(Sweden) Henrik Larsson	(Finland) Jouni Tähti	(Finland) Jouni Tähti	(Slovenia) Matej Brajkovič	(Sweden) Henrik Larsson	(Finland) Jouni Tähti
2022	(Slovenia) Laško	(Sweden) Henrik Larsson	(Republic of Ireland) Fred Dinsmore	(Finland) Jouni Tähti	(Republic of Ireland) Fred Dinsmore	(Finland) Jouni Tähti	(Sweden) Henrik Larsson
2023	(Finland) Tampere	(Finland) Jouni Tähti	(Sweden) Henrik Larsson	(Sweden) Henrik Larsson	(Republic of Ireland) Fred Dinsmore	(Slovenia) Matej Brajkovič	(Finland) Jouni Tähti
2024	(Slovenia) Podčetrtek	(Sweden) Henrik Larsson	(Slovenia) Matej Brajkovič	(Finland) Jouni Tähti	(Italy) Fabio Del Zoppo	(Poland) Emil Malanowski	(Slovenia) Matej Brajkovič
2025	(Estonia) Tallinn	(Finland) Jouni Tähti	(Sweden) Henrik Larsson	(Finland) Jouni Tähti	(Sweden) Henrik Larsson	(Sweden) Henrik Larsson	(Slovenia) David Slacek

=== Men's teams ===
Year	Venue	Champion	Score	Runner-up	Semi-finalists	
1985	(Austria) St. Johann	Germany		Sweden	Austria	Switzerland
1986	(Norway) Oslo	Sweden		Germany	United Kingdom	Norway
1987	(Germany) Stolberg	Germany		Sweden	Austria	Switzerland
1988	(Sweden) Stockholm	Germany		Sweden	Norway	Austria
1989	(Liechtenstein) Schaan	Germany		Austria	Sweden	Norway
1990	(Switzerland) St. Moritz	Sweden		Germany	Switzerland	Norway
1991	(Italy) Mussolente	Germany		Sweden	Austria	Switzerland
1992	(Austria) Velden	Germany		Sweden	Austria	Norway
1993	(Norway) Oslo	Germany		Sweden	Switzerland	Finland
1994	(Finland) Tampere	Germany		Austria	Switzerland	Sweden
1995	(Belgium) Antwerp	Germany		Sweden	Norway	Austria
1996	(Hungary) Békéscsaba	Germany		Austria	Denmark	Switzerland
1997	(Norway) Stavanger	Germany		Denmark	Luxembourg	Austria
1998	Luxembourg	Denmark		Finland	Germany	United Kingdom
1999	(Poland) Poznań	Germany		Netherlands	Finland	Norway
2000	(Austria) Bregenz	Netherlands		Germany	Finland	Sweden
2001	(Czech Republic) Karlovy Vary	Germany		Sweden	Netherlands	Switzerland
2002	(Finland) Tampere	Germany		Finland	Hungary	Sweden
2003	(Poland) Białystok	Sweden		Croatia	Switzerland	Netherlands
2004	(Czech Republic) Prague	Netherlands		Germany	Italy	Finland
2005	(Netherlands) Veldhoven	Germany		Czech Republic	Netherlands	Finland
2006–2011: no events held
2012	Luxembourg	Spain	2:1	Germany	Finland	Austria
2013	(Slovenia) Portorož	Netherlands	2:1	Finland	United Kingdom	Russia
2014	(Cyprus) Kyrenia	Austria	2:1	Spain	Germany	Portugal
2015	(Portugal) Vale do Lobo	Poland	2:1	Netherlands	Germany	Austria
2016	(Austria) St. Johann	Germany	2:1	Russia	Sweden	Finland
2017	(Portugal) Albufeira	Austria	2:1	Finland	Poland	Spain
2018	(Netherlands) Veldhoven	Poland	2:1	Netherlands	Croatia	Estonia
2019	(Italy) Treviso	Spain	2:0	Austria	Poland	Russia
2020	Cancelled due to COVID-19 in Turkey					
2021	(Turkey) Antalya	Russia	2:0	Denmark	Germany	Poland
2022	(Slovenia) Laško	Finland	2:0	Poland	Denmark	Spain
2023	(Finland) Tampere	Poland	2:1	Norway	Spain	Netherlands
2024	(Slovenia) Podčetrtek	Poland	2:0	Spain	Netherlands	Germany
2025	(Estonia) Tallinn	Germany	2:1	Austria	Poland	Spain
2026	(Turkey) Antalya	Spain	3:0	Germany	Switzerland	Turkey

=== Women's teams ===
Year	Venue	Champion	Score	Runner-up	Semi-finalists	
1989	(Liechtenstein) Schaan	Sweden		Germany	Switzerland	Austria
1990	(Switzerland) St. Moritz	Switzerland		Germany	Austria	Sweden
1991	(Italy) Mussolente	Sweden		Switzerland	Germany	Austria
1992	(Austria) Velden	Germany		Sweden	Switzerland	Austria
1993	(Norway) Oslo	Sweden		Germany	Switzerland	Austria
1994	(Finland) Tampere	Germany		Sweden	Austria	Switzerland
1995	(Belgium) Antwerp	Germany		Sweden	Netherlands	Austria
1996	(Hungary) Békéscsaba	Germany		Switzerland	Norway	Austria
1997	(Norway) Stavanger	Switzerland		Germany	Austria	Norway
1998	Luxembourg	Norway		Sweden	Switzerland	Germany
1999	(Poland) Posen	Sweden		Norway	Germany	Netherlands
2000	(Austria) Bregenz	Sweden		Switzerland	Austria	Germany
2001	(Czech Republic) Brno	Germany		Norway	Austria	Sweden
2002	(Finland) Tampere	Sweden		Germany	Denmark	Finland
2003	(Poland) Białystok	Germany		Sweden	Netherlands	Finland
2004	(Czech Republic) Prague	Germany		Denmark	Netherlands	Finland
2005	(Netherlands) Veldhoven	Germany		Netherlands	Italy	United Kingdom
2006–2011: no events held
2012	Luxembourg	Poland	5:4	Norway	Russia	Austria
2013	(Slovenia) Portorož	Sweden	2:0	Bulgaria	Poland	Austria
2014	(Cyprus) Kyrenia	Austria	2:0	Russia	Norway	Switzerland
2015	(Portugal) Vale do Lobo	Russia	2:0	Norway	Switzerland	Austria
2016	(Austria) St. Johann	Poland	2:1	Russia	Norway	Germany
2017	(Portugal) Albufeira	Russia	2:0	Spain	Switzerland	Netherlands
2018	(Netherlands) Veldhoven	Portugal	2:0	Ukraine	Netherlands	Russia
2019	(Italy) Treviso	Portugal	2:0	Germany	Russia	Poland
2020	Cancelled due to COVID-19 in Turkey					
2021	(Turkey) Antalya	Russia	2:0	Germany	Poland	Sweden
2022	(Slovenia) Laško	Germany	2:1	Norway	Poland	Switzerland
2023	(Finland) Tampere	Poland	2:0	Ukraine	Germany	Portugal
2024	(Slovenia) Podčetrtek	Poland	2:1	Germany	Austria	Sweden
2025	(Estonia) Tallinn	Austria	2:1	Germany	Poland	Ukraine
2026	(Turkey) Antalya	Germany	2:1	Austria	France	Poland
