= Marharyta Fefilava =

Belarusian pool player (born 1997)

Margaret Fefilova Styer
Personal information
- Born: 31 May 1997 (age 29) Minsk, Belarus

Pool career
- Country: Belarus
- Turned pro: 2016–
- Pool games: eight-ball, nine-ball, ten-ball, straight pool

Tournament wins
- Current rank: 11 WPA
- Highest rank: Number 1 Women Euro Tour 2018-2019. Number 9 WPA

Margaret Fefilova Styer (formerly Marharyta Fefilava; born 31 May 1997) is a Belarusian professional pool player from Minsk, Belarus. Fefilova has won dozens of Belarusian national women's championships, with an additional three national championships in mixed competitions against both men and women. She is the first player from Belarus to win a medal at the European Pool Championships.

Fefilova is a regular player on the Euro Tour and the Baltic Pool League. She has been the number one ranked player on the Euro Tour after winning two Tour events in 2017, the Dutch Open and the Portugal Open.

== Career ==
=== Early career ===
Fefilova saw her first success in 2011 when she played in her first national eight-ball competition where she reached the semi-finals. The following year, she won her first national championship title in the junior women's championships in nine-ball and first participated in the European Girls Championships ten-ball competition, reaching the quarter-finals. In October, she won the final of the Belarusian eight-ball championship against Yana Shut. The following season, she succeeded in winning two competitions at the national women's championships. In the eight-ball final, she defeated Anastasiya Tumilovich 4–1 and in nine-ball, she won 5–0 against Natalya Kozlovsky.

In early 2013, victories followed in the Belarusian under-18 championship and the nine-ball cup competition. Later that season she first competed in the nine-ball Baltic Pool League held in Tartu and reached the final where she won 7–4 against Agnė Jarušauskaitė. Shortly after, she also won the ten-ball national championship. In the 2013 European Girls Championships, Fjafilawa twice reached the quarter-finals. In September, Fefilova defeated Simona Milišauskaitė to win her second Baltic Pool League championship in Riga, Latvia.

In March 2014, Fefilova became the Belarusian under-18 champion in the disciplines of both eight-ball and nine-ball. Fjafilawa played in the 2014 European Pool Championship, entering the main women's nine-ball competition for the first time, however, she lost to defending champion Jasmin Ouschan 8–7. She also entered the junior events, reaching the semi-final of the eight-ball competition, and reached the final of the nine-ball competition, losing 3–6 to Dianna Khodjaeva. Fjafilawa competed for the junior national team at both the 2014 and 2015 European Girls Championships, where the team reached the semi-finals in 2014.

=== Career (2015–present) ===
In April 2015, Fefilova won the first Belarusian medal at the European Championships. After defeating Louise Furberg and Kristina Tkach, she reached the semi-final of straight pool, losing to Ouschan 36–75 and earning a bronze medal. In 2016, Fefilova won her third Baltic Pool League championship, defeating Ukrainian player Daryna Sirantschuk 6–2 in her hometown of Minsk. Also in nine-ball, Fjafilawa won her first medal on the Euro Tour at the 2016 North Cyprus Open, reaching the final where she lost 3–7 to Kristina Tkach. The following season, she won her first event on the Tour, defeating Oliwia Zalewska 7–2 in the final of the 2017 Dutch Open. Later that season, she won her second event at the 2017 Braga Open, defeating Katarzyna Wesołowska 7–4 in the final. After the Braga Open, she finished the season ranked as the number one player on Tour.

The following two seasons saw Fefilova reach the final of both the 2018 and 2019 Austria Open events. She played Jasmin Ouschan in the final of both events, losing both, losing 2–7 and 1–7 respectively. In addition to the Austria Open, she reached the final of both the 2019 Klagenfurt Open and 2019 Treviso Open, losing to Tkach on both occasions.

== Personal life ==
Fefilova was born on 31 May 1997. In 2015, Fefilova and Yana Shut became the first billiard players in Belarus to receive state funding.

She is married to American professional pool player Tyler Styer.

== Titles & achievements ==
- 2026 WPBA Borderline Brunswick/Pechauer Invitational
- 2026 WPA Women's World Ten-ball Championship
- 2026 WPBA Raxx Mezz Olhausen CPBA Invitational
- 2024 WPBA Olhausen Colorado Classic
- 2021 European Pool Championship 9-ball
- 2019 Belarusian Pool Championship Ten-ball
- 2019 Belarusian Pool Championship Straight Pool
- 2018 Belarusian Pool Championship Ten-ball
- 2018 Belarusian Pool Championship Eight-ball
- 2018 Belarusian Pool Championship Straight Pool
- 2017 Portugal Open
- 2017 Euro Tour Dutch Open
- 2017 Belarusian Pool Championship Ten-ball
- 2017 Belarusian Pool Championship Nine-ball
- 2017 Belarusian Pool Championship Eight-ball
- 2017 Belarusian Pool Championship Straight Pool
- 2014 Belarusian Pool Championship Ten-ball
- 2016 Belarusian Pool Championship Nine-ball
- 2016 Belarusian Pool Championship Eight-ball
- 2015 Belarusian Pool Championship Ten-ball
- 2015 Belarusian Pool Championship Nine-ball
- 2015 Belarusian Pool Championship Eight-ball
- 2014 Belarusian Pool Championship Ten-ball
- 2014 Belarusian Pool Championship Nine-ball
- 2014 Belarusian Pool Championship Eight-ball
- 2013 Belarusian Pool Championship Nine-ball
- 2013 Belarusian Pool Championship Eight-ball
- 2012 Belarusian Pool Championship Nine-ball
- 2012 Belarusian Pool Championship Eight-ball
