= Tamara Peeters =

Dutch pool player, born April 1982

Personal information
- Born: 20 April 1982 (age 44) Geleen, Netherlands

Pool career
- Country: Netherlands
- Turned pro: 2009
- Best finish: Runner-up at the European Pool Championships

Tamara Peeters (née Rademakers, born 20 April 1982) is a Dutch professional pool player. Peeters reached the semi-finals of the Women's World Pool Billiard Association Masters event in 2017. Peeters twice reached the knockout rounds at the Women's WPA World Nine-ball Championship in both 2009 and 2010, losing in the last 32.

Peeters is a twice semi-finalist of events on the Euro Tour, reaching the semi-final at the 2013 Portugal Open, and the 2018 Leende Open. Peeters is also a two-time European Pool Championship runner up. Peeters reached the final of the 8-Ball event in 2018, and the 10-Ball in 2019.
