= Ana Gradišnik =

Slovenian pool player

Personal information
- Born: 4 October 1996 (age 29)

Pool career
- Country: Slovenia

Ana Gradišnik (born 4 October 1996) is a Slovenian professional pool player. She is a three-time runner-up at events on the Euro Tour.

== Titles ==
- 2024 European Pool Championship 8-ball
