= Sanjin Pehlivanović =

Bosnian professional pool player (born 2001)

Personal information
- Born: 11 August 2001 (age 24) Sarajevo

Pool career
- Country: Bosnia and Herzegovina
- Pool games: 8-Ball, 9-Ball, 10-Ball
- Current rank: 37

Sanjin Pehlivanović (born 11 August 2001) is a Bosnian professional pool player. He is an eight-time junior European Pool Championships champion, winning events 8-Ball, 9-Ball, and 10-Ball. In 2021, he also received a runners-up medal in the European championship 9-Ball event, losing in the final to Germany's Joshua Filler.

At the 2017 Klagenfurt Open, Pehlivanović reached the quarter-finals, his best result on the Euro Tour to date. He would lose the match 9–8 to Mateusz Śniegocki.

== Titles and achievements ==
- 2022 European Pool Championship 10-Ball
- 2017 WPA World Nine-ball Junior Championship
- 2015 Euro Tour Salzberg Open
