= Line Kjørsvik =

Norwegian pool player (born 1975)

Line Kjørsvik (born December 29, 1975) is a Norwegian professional pool player. Kjørsvik is a regular player for the WPBA-Tour in America. At the European Pool Championships Kjørsvik has won six championships. At the World Games 2005 she won the bronze medal in the Nine-ball event, reaching the semi-final. At the WPA Women's World Nine-ball Championship, Kjørsvik reached her best position in 2006 reaching the quarter-finals. In addition, she is 35 times Norwegian pool champion.

Kjørsvik is also a successful player on the Euro Tour, where she has won two events at the 2005 Italian Open, and the 2004 Dutch Open.

== Titles ==
- 2001 European Pool Championship Straight Pool
- 2004 European Pool Championship 8-ball
- 2006 European Pool Championship 9-ball
- 2012 European Pool Championship Straight Pool
- 2013 European Pool Championship 8-ball
