= Marc Bijsterbosch =

Dutch pool player

Personal information
- Nickname: "The Beast from the East"
- Born: 31 December 1993 (age 32) Eindhoven, Netherlands

Pool career
- Country: Netherlands
- Pool games: 9-Ball

Tournament wins
- Major: European Champion (2017)
- Current rank: 125

Marc Bijsterbosch (born 31 December 1993) is a Dutch professional pool player. Bijsterbosch won the 10-Ball event at the 2017 European Pool Championship, and reached the final of the 2014 Slovenian Open Euro Tour event, where he lost 9–4 to Denis Grabe.

== Titles ==
- 2017 European Pool Championship 10-ball
