= Tomasz Kapłan =

Polish pool player

Personal information
- Born: 14 January 1984 (age 42) Rzeszów, Poland

Pool career
- Country: Poland
- Best finish: Quarter finals 2021 WPA World Nine-ball Championship

Tomasz Kapłan (born 14 January 1984) is a Polish professional pool player. He won the 2011 European Pool Championships in the discipline of Straight pool. He has played on the Euro Tour since 2009, reaching the semi-finals on three occasions, most recently at the 2018 Treviso Open. Kaplan has reached the final on one occasion, at the 2013 Bosnia & Herzegovina Open, losing to Mateusz Śniegocki.

== Titles ==
- 2011 Polish Pool Championship 10-Ball
- 2011 European Pool Championship Straight Pool
- 2014 Polish Pool Championship 8-Ball
- 2012 Polish Pool Championship 14.1
- 2010 Polish Pool Championship 14.1
- 2009 Polish Pool Championship 14.1
- 2008 Polish Pool Championship 8-Ball
- 2008 Polish Pool Championship 14.1
- 2007 Polish Pool Championship 8-Ball
- 2007 Polish Pool Championship 14.1
- 2005 Polish Pool Championship 8-Ball
- 2005 Polish Pool Championship 14.1
- 2004 Polish Pool Championship 8-Ball
- 2003 Polish Pool Championship 9-Ball
- 2003 Polish Pool Championship 8-Ball
- 2001 Polish Pool Championship 9-Ball
