= Francisco Díaz-Pizarro =

Spanish pool player

Francisco Diaz-Pizarro
Personal information
- Born: 27 May 1977 (age 49)

Pool career
- Country: Spain
- Pool games: 8-Ball, 9-Ball, 10-Ball

Francisco Diaz-Pizarro is a Spanish professional pool player. Diaz-Pizarro is a two time European champion winning the 9-Ball event in 2012 and 2015. In 2015, he also received a runners-up medal in the 10-Ball event, losing in the final to Greece's Alexander Kazakis.

Diaz is also a mainstay competitor of the Euro Tour, reaching the semi-final of four events, including the 2018 Dynamic Billiard Treviso Open.

== Achievements ==
- 2015 European Pool Championship 9-Ball
- 2012 European Pool Championship 9-Ball
- 2012 Spanish Pool Championship 9-Ball
