= Olivér Szolnoki =

Hungarian pool player, born 1997

Oliver Szolnoki
Personal information
- Born: 6 May 1997 (age 29) Veszprém, Hungary

Pool career
- Country: Hungary
- Best finish: Semi finals 2021 WPA World Nine-ball Championship
- Current rank: 27 (WPA)
- Highest rank: 1 (Euro Tour)

Oliver Szolnoki (born 6 May 1997) is a Hungarian professional pool player. A regular on the Euro Tour, Szolnoki reached the quarter-finals of the 2019 Veldhoven Open. He reached a high ranking of 1st on the Tour in 2024.

Szolnoki won four medals at the World Pool-Billiard Association world championship events, reaching the final of the under-16s eight-ball event in 2013, and the youth nine-ball event in 2019.

== Titles ==
- 2025 Euro Tour Spanish Open
- 2025 Predator Little Monster Mixed Doubles Open
- 2025 World Games Ten-ball Singles
- 2024 Euro Tour Turkey Open
- 2024 European Pool Championship 10-Ball
- 2021 Diamond Open 9-Ball Division
