= Stephan Cohen =

French pocket billiards player (1971–2023)

Medal record

Men's nine-ball

Representing France

World Games
Bronze medal – third place	2009 Kaohsiung	Individual

Stephan Cohen (14 August 1971 – 18 April 2023) was a French professional pocket billiards player. In 2009, he won the Dragon 14.1 Tournament by defeating Mika Immonen of Finland.

Cohen died of a heart attack on 18 April 2023, at the age of 51.

== Achievements ==
- 2009 Dragon 14.1 Tournament
- 2011 European Pool Championship 10-Ball
