= Henrik Larsson (pool player) =

Wheelchair pool player from Sweden

Personal information
- Born: 16 November 1971 (age 54) Malmo, Sweden
- Website: www.henriklarsson.org

Pool career
- Country: Sweden
- Pool games: nine-ball

Henrik Larsson (born 16 November 1971) is a Swedish professional wheelchair pool player from Malmo, Sweden. Larsson is a five-time WPA World Nine-ball Championship winner, WPA World Eight-ball Championship winner and 16-time European Pool Championship winner.

== Titles ==
- 2025 European Pool Championships 10-ball
- 2024 European Pool Championships 8-ball
- 2023 European Pool Championships 9-ball
- 2022 European Pool Championships 8-ball
- 2021 European Pool Championships 10-ball
- 2021 European Pool Championships 8-ball
- 2019 European Pool Championships 10-ball
- 2016 WPA World 9-ball Championship
- 2016 European Pool Championships 9-ball
- 2016 European Pool Championships 8-ball
- 2014 WPA World 9-ball Championship
- 2012 WPA World 9-ball Championship
- 2011 European Pool Championships 9-ball
- 2007 WPA World 9-ball Championship
- 2005 European Pool Championships 9-ball
- 2004 European Pool Championships 8-ball
- 2003 WPA World 9-ball Championship
- 2002 European Pool Championships 9-ball
- 2001 European Pool Championships 9-ball
- 2000 European Pool Championships 9-ball
- 1999 European Pool Championships 8-ball
