= Jouni Tähti =

Finnish professional pool player

Personal information
- Born: 4 April 1968 (age 58) Kaarina

Pool career
- Country: Finland

Tournament wins
- Major: European Pool Championships (33 times)
- World Champion: World Wheelchair Billiard Champion (2002, 2009, 2010, 2011 and 2013)

Jouni Tähti (born 4 April 1968) is a Finnish disabled professional pool player. He is a five-times world champion in 9-ball wheelchair billiards, having won the competition in 2002, 2009, 2010, 2011 and 2013. He won the silver in 2012 and the bronze in 2014. He has achieved a medal placing in every world championship he has participated in. In the European Pool Championships he has won 33 medal places making him one of the most successful players in this class. Tähti has played billiards since the age of eight.

He was born in Kaarina, Finland.

== Titles ==
- WPA World Nine-ball Championship
  - (2002, 2009, 2010, 2011, 2013)
- European Pool Championships
  - 8-ball (2002, 2003, 2005, 2006, 2009, 2011, 2012, 2014, 2017, 2018, 2019, 2023, 2025)
  - 10-ball (2010, 2011, 2015, 2016, 2018, 2022)
  - 9-ball (2003, 2008, 2009, 2010, 2012, 2014, 2015, 2017, 2018, 2019, 2021, 2022, 2024, 2025)
