= Mario He =

Austrian pool player (born 1993)

Personal information
- Nickname: "The Panda"
- Born: 3 August 1993 (age 32)

Pool career
- Country: Austria
- Pool games: 9-Ball, 8-Ball
- Best finish: Semi finals 2023 WPA World Nine-ball Championship

Tournament wins
- Minor: 6 Euro Tour events
- Highest rank: 23

Mario He (born 3 August 1993, Rankweil, Austria) is an Austrian professional pool player. He is a former winner of the European Pool Championships, and winner of both the 2017 and 2019 World Cup of Pool events alongside Albin Ouschan.

== Career ==
He has won six Euro Tour events, the first in 2016, at the North Cyprus Open 2016, and later the 2017 Austrian Open, and in 2018 both the 2018 Veldhoven Open, and 2018 Klagenfurt Open, and 2019 Veldhoven Open and 2022 Italian Open. With six victories overall, He is in the top 6 winners of Euro Tour events. He competed in the 2023 US Open 8 and 10 ball event placing 2nd to Fedor Gorst. Mario has the nickname of "The Panda" which was given to him by his teammate Albin Ouschan.

He was set to represent Europe for the first time at the 2018 Mosconi Cup, however, he withdrew from the team, due to a failed drugs test. Having previously reached the final of the 9-ball 2011 European Pool Championships, He won the 2012 European Pool Championships in 8-Ball defeating Artem Koschowyj of Ukraine in the final. He won the final in an 8–0 whitewash.

In 2017, alongside Albin Ouschan, He won the 2017 World Cup of Pool. Entering the tournament as second seeds, the team defeated Sweden (7–5), Russia (7–2), England (9–7) and third seed China (9–1) on route to the final. In the final, they played the USA team of Shane Van Boening, and Skyler Woodward, who defeated the first seeded team of Chinese Taipei in the semi-final. The Austrian team prevailed in the final, winning the final 10–6.

On September 29, 2024 Carlo Biado won the inaugural Ho Chi Minh City Open Championship in Ho Xuan Huong Gymnasium, Vietnam, defeating He of Austria 13–8.

== Personal life ==
Outside of pool, He is also a chess player, where he was a young state champion.

== Titles & Achievements ==
- 2024 International Straight Pool Open
- 2024 European Pool Championship 9-Ball
- 2023 American Straight Pool Championship
- 2022 Euro Tour Italian Open
- 2021 Predator Ohio Open 10-Ball
- 2021 European Pool Championship 8-Ball
- 2019 World Cup of Pool - with (Albin Ouschan)
- 2019 Euro Tour Veldhoven Open
- 2018 Euro Tour Klagenfurt Open
- 2018 Euro Tour Veldhoven Open
- 2017 Euro Tour North Cyprus Open
- 2017 World Cup of Pool - with (Albin Ouschan)
- 2016 Euro Tour Austria Open
- 2012 European Pool Championship 8-Ball
- 2015 Austrian Pool Championship 9-Ball
- 2015 Austrian Pool Championship 14.1
- 2015 Austrian Pool Championship 10-Ball
- 2014 Austrian Pool Championship 8-Ball
- 2014 Austrian Pool Championship 9-Ball
- 2013 Austrian Pool Championship 10-Ball
- 2013 Austrian Pool Championship 14.1
- 2013 Austrian Pool Championship 8-Ball
- 2011 Austrian Pool Championship 8-Ball
- 2011 Austrian Pool Championship 10-Ball
- 2010 Austrian Pool Championship 8-Ball
