= Euro Tour =

European pool events

- Euro Tour logo (2007-present)

Tournament information
- Location: Europe
- Established: 1992
- Organisation(s): European Pocket Billiard Federation
- Format: Single Elimination

The Euro Tour is a series of professional pool events set around Europe, founded in 1992, and created by the European Pocket Billiard Federation. The Tour's first event was the Belgium Open, held on 29–31 May 1992. The event was won by Mika Immonen.

As of 2026, the Euro Tour has hosted 197 tournaments, currently in the discipline of 8-Ball, 9-Ball & 10-Ball, hosting between 1 and 6 events per year, since 2010.

== Top Performers ==
Name	Winner	Runner-up	Finals	Semi-final or better
(Germany) Ralf Souquet	23	11	34	49
(Germany) Oliver Ortmann	14	9	23	36
(Netherlands) Niels Feijen	11	7	18	40
(Germany) Joshua Filler	10	6	16	19
(Netherlands) Nick van den Berg	10	5	15	21
(Germany) Thomas Engert	9	10	19	30
(Austria) Mario He	6	5	10	18
(United Kingdom) Mark Gray	6	1	7	14
(Sweden) Tom Storm	5	3	8	14
(Poland) Mateusz Śniegocki	5	3	6	14
(Sweden) Marcus Chamat	4	5	9	16
(United Kingdom) Daryl Peach	4	1	5	9

(Note: Only shows those with 4 or more event wins.)
