= WPA Women's world ranking =

Rankings for the sport pool

The WPA Women's world pool rankings are the official system of ranking professional Pool (cue sports) players to determine automatic qualification and seeding for tournaments sanctioned by the World Pool Association.

== Ranking system ==
The ranking is based on the finishing positions of the players in official WPA sanctioned tournaments.

It is also used to determine the seeding of the players for the World Championships in nine-ball, eight-ball and ten-ball

== Current rankings ==
Top 20 Players (as of 5 May 2026)
Rank	Player	Points
1	(Austria) Jasmin Ouschan	47134
2	(Germany) Pia Filler	44356
3	(Authorised Neutral Athletes) Kristina Tkach	43313
4	(Taiwan) Wei Tzu-chien	40880
5	(Bulgaria) Kristina Zlateva	38932
6	(Taiwan) Chou Chieh-yu	38016
7	(United Kingdom) Kelly Fisher	37752
8	(Philippines) Chezka Centeno	36612
9	(South Korea) Seo Seoa	36372
10	(Authorised Neutral Athletes) Marharyta Fefilava	34606
11	(Australia) Hung Meng-hsia	32516
12	(Japan) Chihiro Kawahara	30617
13	(United States) Savannah Easton	30034
14	(Taiwan) Wang Wan-Ling	29992
15	(Taiwan) Chen Chia-hua	29782
16	(United States) Sofia Mast	24568
17	(Taiwan) Chiang Shui-Ching	23718
18	(Canada) Brittany Bryant	22374
19	(China) Han Yu	22368
20	(Philippines) Rubilen Amit	22349
