= 2016 Leende Open =

Tournament information
- Dates: 29 September–2 October 2016
- Venue: Golden Tulip Jagershors
- City: Leende
- Country: Netherlands
- Organisation: Euro Tour
- Format: Single Elimination, Double elimination
- Total prize fund: €38,000
- Winner's share: €4,500
- Defending champion: AUT Albin Ouschan

Final
- Champion: NED Niels Feijen
- Runner-up: ESP David Alcaide
- Score: 9-7

The Dynamic Billard Leende Open 2016 (sometimes known as the 2016 Dutch Open) was a 9-Ball pool tournament, and the fifth Euro Tour event of 2016. The event was held between 29 September and 2 October 2016. The event was won by Niels Feijen, who defeated David Alcaide 9–7 in the final.

Albin Ouschan was the defending champion, having defeated Imran Majid 9–2 in the final of the 2015 Leende Open.

== Tournament format ==
The event was played as a double elimination knockout tournament, until the last 32 stage; where the tournament was contested as a single elimination bracket. Matches were all played as a race to 9 racks. The event saw a total of 153 players compete.

=== Prize fund ===
The tournament prize fund was similar to that of other Euro Tour events, with €4,500 awarded to the winner of the event.

	Prize money
Winner	4.500 €
Finalist	€3.000
Semi finalist	€1.750
Quarter finalist	€1.250
last 16	€1.000
Last 32	€600
33–48	€275
Total	€38.000

== Tournament results ==
1st Round
(Poland) Tomasz Kapłan	5
(Poland) Konrad Juszczyszyn	9
(Germany) Marco Spitzky	3
(Spain) Francisco Sánchez	9
(Germany) Joshua Filler	7
(Sweden) Christian Sparrenlöv	9
(Russia) Ruslan Tschinachow	7
(Poland) Wojciech Trajdos	9
(Russia) Fedor Gorst	9
(England) Daryl Peach	7
(Germany) Sebastian Ludwig	5
(Poland) Mieszko Fortuński	9
(Greece) Alexander Kazakis	9
(Austria) Mario He	8
(Spain) David Alcaide	9
(Poland) Karol Skowerski	6
(Austria) Albin Ouschan	5
(England) Mark Gray	9
(Estonia) Denis Grabe	9
(Albania) Eklent Kaçi	7
(Austria) Maximilian Lechner	4
(Poland) Wojciech Szewczyk	9
(Scotland) Jayson Shaw	4
(England) Imran Majid	9
(Czech Republic) Roman Hybler	9
(Poland) Radosław Babica	6
(Netherlands) Marco Teutscher	4
(Poland) Mateusz Śniegocki	9
(Finland) Petri Makkonen	9
(Poland) Wiktor Zieliński	8
(Spain) Francisco Díaz-Pizarro	6
(Netherlands) Niels Feijen	9

2nd Round
(Poland) Konrad Juszczyszyn	5
(Spain) Francisco Sánchez	9
(Sweden) Christian Sparrenlöv	8
(Poland) Wojciech Trajdos	9
(Russia) Fedor Gorst	9
(Poland) Mieszko Fortuński	4
(Greece) Alexander Kazakis	8
(Spain) David Alcaide	9
(England) Mark Gray	9
(Estonia) Denis Grabe	6
(Poland) Wojciech Szewczyk	9
(England) Imran Majid	3
(Czech Republic) Roman Hybler	9
(Poland) Mateusz Śniegocki	3
(Finland) Petri Makkonen	6
(Netherlands) Niels Feijen	9

Quarterfinals
(Spain) Francisco Sánchez	9
(Poland) Wojciech Trajdos	4
(Russia) Fedor Gorst	6
(Spain) David Alcaide	9
(England) Mark Gray	5
(Poland) Wojciech Szewczyk	9
(Czech Republic) Roman Hybler	7
(Netherlands) Niels Feijen	9

Semifinals
(Spain) Francisco Sánchez	5
(Spain) David Alcaide	9
(Poland) Wojciech Szewczyk	5
(Netherlands) Niels Feijen	9

Finals
(Spain) David Alcaide	7
(Netherlands) Niels Feijen	9
