= 2018 WPA Women's World Nine-ball Championship =

Professional 9 ball tournament

Tournament information
- Dates: December 3–9 2018
- City: Sanya
- Country: China
- Organisation: World Pool-Billiard Association
- Format: Double elimination / Single elimination
- Discipline: Nine-ball
- Total prize fund: $175,000
- Winner's share: $44,000

Final
- Champion: Han Yu (CHN)
- Runner-up: Wang Xiaotong (CHN)
- Score: 9–6

The 2018 Women's World Nine-ball Championship was a professional nine-ball pool tournament that took place in Sanya, China from 3 to 9 December 2018.

The event was entered by 64 participants who were initially divided into 8 groups of 8 players, in which they competed against each other from December 3 to 5 in a double elimination tournament. Four players in each group qualified for the final round, which was played from December 6 to 9. The event was played under "alternating break" format with 3-point break rule and one ball on the foot spot.

Han Yu won the title with a 9–6 victory over Wang Xiaotong in the final. It was Han Yu's third Women's World Nine-ball Championship win, following her previous in 2013 and 2016.

== Preliminary round – Double elimination ==
In the group stage, the double elimination format was played with race to 7 and alternate break.

=== Group A ===
Main Round
(China) Chen Siming | 7
(China) Zhang Pan | 0
(Spain) Silvia Lopez | 2
(China) Pan Lantian | 7
(Chinese Taipei) Hsieh Yu-wen | 5
(South Korea) Seo Seoa | 7
(Indonesia) Fatrah Masum | 1
(China) Jiang Teng | 7
1st playoff round
(China) Zhang Pan | 7
(Spain) Silvia Lopez | 5
(Chinese Taipei) Hsieh Yu-wen | 7
(Indonesia) Fatrah Masum | 3

Winner's Round
(China) Chen Siming | 7
(China) Pan Lantian | 2
(South Korea) Seo Seoa | 6
(China) Jiang Teng | 7
2nd playoff round
(China) Zhang Pan | 7
(South Korea) Seo Seoa | 5
(Chinese Taipei) Hsieh Yu-wen | 4
(China) Pan Lantian | 7

=== Group B ===
Main Round
(Philippines) Rubilen Amit | 7
(Singapore) Ng Yi Huai | 1
(Japan) Miyuki Kuribayashi | 7
(Germany) Pia Filler | 3
(Poland) Oliwia Zalewska | 6
(China) Ye Sisi | 7
(Chinese Taipei) Tan Ho-yun | 7
(South Korea) Kim Ga-young | 5
1st playoff round
(Singapore) Ng Yi Huai | 2
(Germany) Pia Filler | 7
(Poland) Oliwia Zalewska | 2
(South Korea) Kim Ga-young | 7

Winner's Round
(Philippines) Rubilen Amit | 7
(Japan) Miyuki Kuribayashi | 6
(China) Ye Sisi | 3
(Chinese Taipei) Tan Ho-yun | 7
2nd playoff round
(Germany) Pia Filler | 4
(China) Ye Sisi | 7
(South Korea) Kim Ga-young | 5
(Japan) Miyuki Kuribayashi | 7

=== Group C ===
Main Round
(China) Liu Shasha | 7
(China) Zhang Muyan | 3
(Chinese Taipei) Kuo Szu-ting | 7
(South Korea) Lee Woo-jin | 3
(Belarus) Marharyta Fefilava | 7
(China) Liu Xiazhi | 6
(Philippines) Chezka Centeno | 2
(China) Fu Xiaofang | 7
1st playoff round
(China) Zhang Muyan | 7
(South Korea) Lee Woo-jin | 2
(China) Liu Xiazhi | 7
(Philippines) Chezka Centeno | 6

Winner's Round
(China) Liu Shasha | 7
(Chinese Taipei) Kuo Szu-ting | 4
(Belarus) Marharyta Fefilava | 1
(China) Fu Xiaofang | 7
2nd playoff round
(China) Zhang Muyan | 7
(Belarus) Marharyta Fefilava | 2
(China) Liu Xiazhi | 4
(Chinese Taipei) Kuo Szu-ting | 7

=== Group D ===
Main Round
(Chinese Taipei) Wei Tzu-chien | 7
(New Zealand) Molrudee Kasemchaiyanan | 3
(China) Chen Ruolin | 7
(Slovenia) Ana Gradišnik | 4
(China) Xia Yuying | 7
(Russia) Nataliya Seroshtan | 0
(Germany) Veronika Ivanovskaia | 7
(China) Bai Ge | 6
1st playoff round
(New Zealand) Molrudee Kasemchaiyanan | 6
(Slovenia) Ana Gradišnik | 7
(Russia) Nataliya Seroshtan | 7
(China) Bai Ge | 6

Winner's Round
(Chinese Taipei) Wei Tzu-chien | 7
(China) Chen Ruolin | 2
(China) Xia Yuying | 6
(Germany) Veronika Ivanovskaia | 7
2nd playoff round
(Slovenia) Ana Gradišnik | 7
(China) Xia Yuying | 4
(Russia) Nataliya Seroshtan | 5
(China) Chen Ruolin | 7

=== Group E ===
Main Round
(China) Han Yu | 7
(China) Yang Fan | 2
(Japan) Keiko Yukawa | 6
(Austria) Jasmin Ouschan | 7
(Russia) Kristina Tkach | 7
(South Korea) Lim Yun-mi | 2
(China) Han Fang | 7
(China) Gao Meng | 1
1st playoff round
(China) Yang Fan | 7
(Japan) Keiko Yukawa | 2
(South Korea) Lim Yun-mi | 3
(China) Gao Meng | 7

Winner's Round
(China) Han Yu | 6
(Austria) Jasmin Ouschan | 7
(Russia) Kristina Tkach | 6
(China) Han Fang | 7
2nd playoff round
(China) Yang Fan | 4
(Russia) Kristina Tkach | 7
(China) Gao Meng | 0
(China) Han Yu | 7

=== Group F ===
Main Round
(England) Kelly Fisher | 7
(Chinese Taipei) Fan Yu-hsuan | 3
(Portugal) Sara Rocha | 1
(Argentina) Bernarda Soledad Ayala | 7
(England) Allison Fisher | 6
(Indonesia) Angeline Ticoalu | 7
(Czech Republic) Veronika Hubrtová | 7
(China) Chihiro Kawahara | 3
1st playoff round
(Chinese Taipei) Fan Yu-hsuan | 7
(Portugal) Sara Rocha | 2
(England) Allison Fisher | 7
(Japan) Chihiro Kawahara | 2

Winner's Round
(England) Kelly Fisher | 7
(Argentina) Bernarda Soledad Ayala | 2
(Indonesia) Angeline Ticoalu | 7
(Czech Republic) Veronika Hubrtová | 1
2nd playoff round
(Chinese Taipei) Fan Yu-hsuan | 7
(Czech Republic) Veronika Hubrtová | 4
(England) Allison Fisher | 7
(Argentina) Bernarda Soledad Ayala | 1

=== Group G ===
Main Round
(Chinese Taipei) Chen Chia-hua | 3
(China) Zhou Doudou | 7
(South Korea) Jin Hye-ju | 7
(Japan) Akimi Kajatani | 4
(Japan) Yuki Hiraguchi | 7
(Venezuela) Johanna Espinoza | 3
(China) Shi Tianqi | 7
(China) Pan Xiaoting | 5
1st playoff round
(Chinese Taipei) Chen Chia-hua | 7
(Japan) Akimi Kajatani | 6
(Venezuela) Johanna Espinoza | 1
(China) Pan Xiaoting | 7

Winner's Round
(China) Zhou Doudou | 7
(South Korea) Jin Hye-ju | 1
(Japan) Yuki Hiraguchi | 7
(China) Shi Tianqi | 3
2nd playoff round
(Chinese Taipei) Chen Chia-hua | 2
(China) Shi Tianqi | 7
(China) Pan Xiaoting | 5
(South Korea) Jin Hye-ju | 7

=== Group H ===
Main Round
(Chinese Taipei) Chou Chieh-yu | 7
(Poland) Ewa Bak | 1
(Singapore) Tan Hui Ming | 1
(China) Huang Qingning | 7
(Canada) Leanne Lini | 1
(China) Wang Xiaotong | 7
(Germany) Tina Vogelmann | 4
(South Korea) Par Eun-ji | 7
1st playoff round
(Poland) Ewa Bak | 7
(Singapore) Tan Hui Ming | 4
(Canada) Leanne Lini | 4
(Germany) Tina Vogelmann | 7

Winner's Round
(Chinese Taipei) Chou Chieh-yu | 7
(China) Huang Qingning | 3
(China) Wang Xiaotong | 7
(South Korea) Park Eun-ji | 3
2nd playoff round
(Poland) Ewa Bak | 0
(South Korea) Park Eun-ji | 7
(Germany) Tina Vogelmann | 5
(China) Huang Qingning | 7

== Main tournament – Single elimination ==
Knockout stage consisted of last 32 players. Defending champion Siming Chen was defeated by Fu Xiaofang in quarter-finals in a hill-hill match.

1st Round
(China) Chen Siming | 9
(Japan) Miyuki Kuribayashi | 5
(South Korea) Jin Hye-ju | 2
(Chinese Taipei) Kuo Szu-ting | 9
(Russia) Kristina Tkach | 4
(China) Chen Ruolin | 9
(Japan) Yuki Hiraguchi | 6
(China) Fu Xiaofang | 9
(China) Liu Shasha | 9
(Indonesia) Angeline Ticoalu | 4
(China) Han Fang | 5
(China) Jiang Teng | 9
(China) Shi Tianqi | 5
(China) Zhang Pan | 9
(China) Wang Xiaotong | 9
(Chinese Taipei) Wei Tzu-chien | 7
(China) Han Yu | 9
(Slovenia) Ana Gradišnik | 4
(China) Pan Lantian | 8
(Austria) Jasmin Ouschan | 9
(South Korea) Park Eun-ji | 5
(England) Allison Fisher | 9
(Chinese Taipei) Fan Yu-hsuan | 4
(England) Kelly Fisher | 9
(Philippines) Rubilen Amit | 9
(Germany) Veronika Ivanovskaia | 4
(China) Huang Qingning | 9
(China) Zhou Doudou | 7
(Chinese Taipei) Tan Ho-yun | 9
(China) Zhang Muyan | 8
(China) Ye Sisi | 2
(Chinese Taipei) Chou Chieh-yu | 9

2nd Round
(China) Chen Siming | 9
(Chinese Taipei) Kuo Szu-ting | 1
(China) Chen Ruolin | 8
(China) Fu Xiaofang | 9
(China) Liu Shasha | 8
(China) Jiang Teng | 9
(China) Zhang Pan | 4
(China) Wang Xiaotong | 9
(China) Han Yu | 9
(Austria) Jasmin Ouschan | 3
(England) Allison Fisher | 8
(England) Kelly Fisher | 9
(Philippines) Rubilen Amit | 9
(China) Huang Qingning | 3
(Chinese Taipei) Tan Ho-yun | 9
(Chinese Taipei) Chou Chieh-yu | 5

Quarterfinals
(China) Chen Siming | 8
(China) Fu Xiaofang | 9
(China) Jiang Teng | 3
(China) Wang Xiaotong | 9
(China) Han Yu | 9
(England) Kelly Fisher | 8
(Philippines) Rubilen Amit | 9
(Chinese Taipei) Tan Ho-yun | 6

Semifinals
(China) Fu Xiaofang | 8
(China) Wang Xiaotong | 9
(China) Han Yu | 9
(Philippines) Rubilen Amit | 6

Finals
(China) Wang Xiaotong | 6
(China) Han Yu | 9

=== Final ===
Final was played between two Chinese players – Han Yu and Wang Xiaotong. Alternate break format was played, Han Yu won the lag. Both players played three break-and-runs: Han Yu in racks no. 5, 12 and 14; Wang Xiaotong in racks no. 6, 9 a 13.

| Player | Lag | Rack No. | | | | | | | | | | | | | | | Score |
| Player | Lag | 1 | 2 | 3 | 4 | 5 | 6 | 7 | 8 | 9 | 10 | 11 | 12 | 13 | 14 | 15 | Score |
|---|---|---|---|---|---|---|---|---|---|---|---|---|---|---|---|---|---|
| (China) Wang Xiaotong | | | | | | | 1 | 1 | 1 | | 1 | 1 | | | 1 | | 6 |
| (China) Han Yu | X | 1 | 1 | 1 | 1 | 1 | | | | 1 | | | 1 | 1 | | 1 | 9 |
