= 2025 WPA Women's World Eight-ball Championship =

Professional eight-ball pool tournament

2025 WPA Women's World 8-Ball Championship
Tournament information
- Dates: 2–6 July 2025
- Venue: Oneida Hotel & Casino
- City: Green Bay, Wisconsin, U.S.
- Format: Eight-ball

Final
- Champion: Jasmin Ouschan (AUT)
- Runner-up: Chezka Centeno (PHI)

The 2025 WPA Women's World 8-Ball Championship (the 2025 Oneida World Women's 8-Ball Championship for sponsorship reasons) was a professional eight-ball pool tournament held from July 2 to July 6, 2025, at the Oneida Hotel & Casino in Green Bay, Wisconsin, United States. It was sanctioned by the World Pool Association and organized in partnership with the Women's Professional Billiard Association. Jasmin Ouschan of Austria won the title, defeating Chezka Centeno of the Philippines 9–8 in a hill-hill final. The event had a total prize fund of $150,600 with $30,000 being awarded to the winner.

== Tournament format ==
The WPA Women's World 8-Ball Championship is a professional eight-ball pool tournament sanctioned by the World Pool Association (WPA). While a men's world championship for the discipline was established in 2004, the 2025 event marked the inaugural edition of a dedicated women's world championship. The tournament was organized by the Women's Professional Billiard Association (WPBA) and held at the Oneida Casino Hotel in Green Bay, Wisconsin, from July 2 to 6, 2025. The event was preceded by an opening ceremony held on July 1 at Lambeau Field, the home of the NFL team Green Bay Packers.

The tournament featured a field of 64 invited players and was played using a double-elimination format until the final 16 players remained, at which point it transitioned to a knockout bracket. Matches in the double-elimination stages were played as a race to seven racks, whilst in the final stages matches were played as a single race to eight, with the final extended to a race to nine racks. The event utilized the alternating break format, with players taking it in turns to break off. An amateur event –the Roy Skenandore Memorial Tournament – was run in parallel to the event. The championship was broadcast worldwide via the WPBA's YouTube channel and Billiard TV.

=== Prize fund ===
Entry for the event cost players $400 with $125,000 added by tournament organisers. The total prize fund for the event was $150,600, with the winner receiving $30,000. A breakdown of the prize money can be seen below:

Place	Prize
Winner	$30,000
Runner-up	$18,000
Semi-finalist	$13,000
Quarter-finalist	$8,000
Last 16	$4,000

== Tournament summary ==
=== Double-elimination ===
The opening stage was held from July 2 to July 4, 2025 and featured a 64-player invitational field. In the opening double-elimination format, players were required to win three matches to progress, with those losing a match requiring four wins; those who suffered two losses were eliminated from the competition. Matches in the double-elimination stage were a race to seven racks.

There were three teenagers in the draw. Jordan Helfery, aged 14, won her first match against Veronique Menard 7‍–‍3, and Hung Meng-hsia 7‍–‍5 who had a FargoRating almost 150 points higher. (Note: FargoRating measures a pool player's game win/loss ratio and is similar to ELO in chess.) Helfery was eliminated following losses to Chou Chieh-yu and Wei Tzu-chien. Fellow teenager, 15-year-old Savannah Easton lost in the second round to Chen Chia-hua, but proceeded to the third loser's round after a win over Adriana Villar. However, she was also defeated and eliminated by third seed Wei. Seventeen year-old Sofia Mast won her opening round match 7‍–‍4 over Tina Larsson, before losing to Kelly Fisher. She defeated Kennedy Meyman to progress to the loser's qualification round, where she lost to Ana Gradišnik.

The WPBA world number one, Kristina Tkach was behind 4‍–‍6 to Elise Qiu, but won three straight racks to win. Tkach defeated Japanese players Samia Konishi and Yuki Hiragurchi to progress. Chezka Centeno completed a 7‍–‍0 whitewash of Gradišnik in the winners qualification round. Second seed Jasmin Ouschan completed victories over Briani Miller, Rachel Lang and Nina Torvund to progress. Tkach, Margarita Fefilova, Chieh-yu, Centeno, Ouschan, Seo Seoa, Chia-Hua and Kelly Fisher all progressed from the winners side. In the loser's qualification round, four matches finished hill-hill. Pia Filler completed a 7‍–‍6 win over Wang Wan-ling, Hung defeated Nguyen Bich Tram, Kristina Zlateva defeated April Larson and Shui Ching-chiang defeated Ashley Benoit by the same scoreline.

=== Single-elimination ===
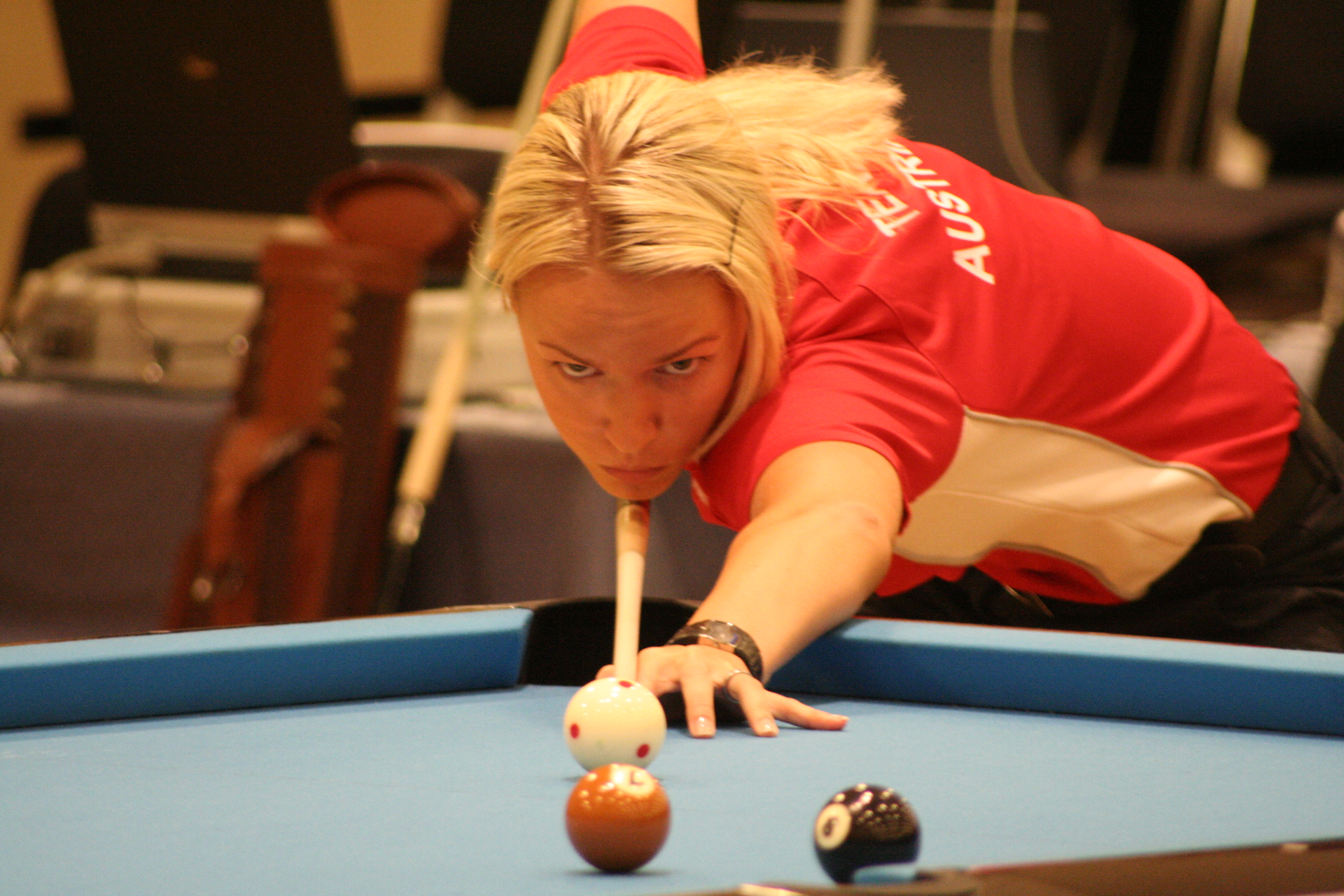
Jasmin Ouschan (pictured in 2008) won the event defeating Chezka Centeno in the final.

The single-elimination stage started with 16 players and was played on July 5 and July 6 as a race to eight racks until the final. In the top half of the draw, Tkach gave up just one rack against tenth seed Pia Filler. She then played Margarita Fefilova after Fefilova overcame Gradišnik. Fefilova defeated the tournament first seed Tkach 8‍–‍4 to reach the semi-final. Chou Chieh-yu and Wei Tzu-chien went to a deciding rack before Wei took the win. She then faced Centeno, who had defeated Chihiro Kawahara 8‍–‍4 in the first round. The quarter-final match also went hill-hill before Centeno defeated Wei. Centeno, a former World Ten-ball Champion, defeated Fefilova 8‍–‍6 to reach the final.

In the bottom half, Ouschan defeated Samia Konishi to face the winner of the match between Seo and Zlateva. That match went hill-hill, before Zlateva eventually won. Ouschan defeated Zlateva 8‍–‍3 to reach the semi-finals. Shui Ching-chiang and Chen Chia-hua also went hill-hill and was won by Chen. She played Hung Meng-hsia, who had completed an 8‍–‍4 win over Kelly Fisher. This was won by Chen, defeating Hung 8‍–‍6, but was defeated by Ouschan 4‍–‍8.

The final was played as a race to nine racks. Ouschan completed two break and run in racks one and five as she led 4‍–‍2. She made another one in rack nine to lead 6‍–‍3, but made a positional mistake in rack 11 allowing Centeno to win the rack. This, in addition to two of her own break and runs tied the scores. In rack 14, Centeno attempted to pot the 8-ball, but still had another ball to pot committing a foul. This allowed Ouschan to go onto the hill 8‍–‍6. Ouschan made a dry break in the next rack as her opponent won the next two to make it 8‍–‍8. The pair exchanged a high-five before the deciding rack. Ouschan, breaking for the match, completed a break and run to win the match and tournament. After the match she humorously said "you know... I've never been a fan of [eight]-ball!"

== Final bracket ==
The following results cover the single-elimination stage from the Last 16 to the Final. All matches were a race to 8, except for the final which was a race to 9.

Last 16
Kristina Tkach (RUS)	8
Pia Filler (GER)	1
Margarita Fefilova (BLR)	8
Ana Gradišnik (SLO)	4
Chou Chieh-yu (TPE)	7
Wei Tzu-chien (TPE)	8
Chezka Centeno (PHI)	8
Chihiro Kawahara (JPN)	4
Jasmin Ouschan (AUT)	8
Samia Konishi (JPN)	2
Seo Seoa (KOR)	7
Kristina Zlateva (BUL)	8
Chen Chia-hua (TPE)	8
Shui Ching-chiang (TPE)	7
Kelly Fisher (GBR)	4 (Note: Some sources report this score as 8‍–‍0, but live stream show this as 8‍–‍4.)
Hung Meng-hsia (AUS)	8

Quarter-finals
Kristina Tkach (RUS)	4
Margarita Fefilova (BLR)	8
Wei Tzu-chien (TPE)	7
Chezka Centeno (PHI)	8
Jasmin Ouschan (AUT)	8
Kristina Zlateva (BUL)	3
Chen Chia-hua (TPE)	8
Hung Meng-hsia (AUS)	6

Semi-finals
Margarita Fefilova (BLR)	6
Chezka Centeno (PHI)	8
Jasmin Ouschan (AUT)	8
Chen Chia-hua (TPE)	4

Final
Chezka Centeno (PHI)	8
Jasmin Ouschan (AUT)	9
