= 2017 WPA World Nine-ball Junior Championship =

World Junior pool championship, held October/November 2017

2017 WPA World Nine-ball Juniors Championship
Tournament information
- Dates: October 30, 2017–2 November 2017
- City: Moscow
- Country: Russia
- Organisation: WPA
- Format: double elimination, single elimination

Final
- Champion: Sanjin Pehlivanovic (U17); Fedor Gorst (boys); Kristina Tkach (girls)

The 2017 WPA World Nine-ball Junior Championship was a professional youth 9-Ball World Championship held between October 30 and November 2, 2017. The event was split into three competitions, Under 17s, boys and girls. Sanjin Pehlivanović won the U17 event, defeating Robbie Capito in the final, with Fedor Gorst winning the boys event. Kristina Tkatsch won the girls event defeating South Korea's Lee Woo-jin in the final.

== Results ==
Competition	Winner	Runner-up	Semifinalist
Under 17s event	BIH Sanjin Pehlivanović	HKG Robbie Capito	POL Wiktor Zieliński
Under 17s event	BIH Sanjin Pehlivanović	HKG Robbie Capito	TRNC Mustafa Alnar
Boys event	RUS Fedor Gorst	MNG Enkhbold Temuujin	DEU Patrick Hofmann
Boys event	RUS Fedor Gorst	MNG Enkhbold Temuujin	NLD Jan van Lierop
Girls event	RUS Kristina Tkatsch	KOR Lee Woo-jin	USA April Larson
Girls event	RUS Kristina Tkatsch	KOR Lee Woo-jin	TPE Chen Chia-hua

== Competitions ==
=== Under 17s event ===
==== Preliminary round ====
The following players were eliminated in the preliminary round:

Round 1 (17–23 Place)

- SAU Khalid Omar Alghamdi
- CAN Brenden Croft
- RUS Roman Grischin
- ZAF Stephanus Grove
- BON Gyairon Martis
- ZAF Vian Smithers
- TPE Wang Wei-cheng

Round 2 (13–16 Place)

- CAN Dean Cuillerier
- ZAF Craig Petersen
- KOR Seo Young-won
- USA Joshua Shultz

Round 3 (9.–12. Place)

- RUS Stanislaw Achtjamow
- UKR Danylo Kaljajew
- USA Eric Roberts
- USA Joey Tate

==== Finals ====
Quarterfinals
1	HKG Robbie Capito	9
8	CRI Andrés Aguilar	4
4	TRNC Mustafa Alnar	9
5	RUS Dmitri Schkudow	4
2	BLR Uladsislau Schopik	2
7	POL Wiktor Zieliński	9
3	BIH Sanjin Pehlivanović	9
6	CUW Shamir Tremus	1

Semifinals
HKG Robbie Capito	9
TRNC Mustafa Alnar	7
POL Wiktor Zieliński	4
BIH Sanjin Pehlivanović	9

Finals
HKG Robbie Capito	1
BIH Sanjin Pehlivanović	9

=== Boys event ===
==== Preliminary round ====
The following players were eliminated in the preliminary round:

Round 1 (17.–24. Place)

- SAU Sulaiman Aljulaidan
- USA William Hunkins
- RUS Alexander Kirin
- RUS Wladimir Matwijenko
- ZAF Peter Nwaila
- ZAF Clint Petersen
- MNG Tseveennamjil Taivanbat
- JPN Tanaka Taiki

Round 2 (13.–16. Place)

- ARG Luciano Ayala
- KOR Kim Dae-hyun
- RUS Ilja Nekleionow
- JPN Sugayama Kouki

Round 3 (9.–12. Place)

- ARG Alexis Groshaus
- TPE Hsu Yi-fu
- ZAF David Kriel
- USA Austin Summers

==== Finals ====
Quarterfinals
1	RUS Fedor Gorst	11
8	HKG Kin Ling Yip	2
4	DEU Kevin Schiller	7
5	DEU Patrick Hofmann	11
2	RUS Jegor Trifonow	8
7	MNG Enkhbold Temuujin	11
3	NLD Jan van Lierop	11
6	USA Richard Evans	6

Semifinals
RUS Fedor Gorst	11
DEU Patrick Hofmann	8
MNG Enkhbold Temuujin	11
NLD Jan van Lierop	6

Finals
RUS Fedor Gorst	11
MNG Enkhbold Temuujin	3

=== Girls event ===
==== Preliminary round ====
The following players were eliminated in the preliminary round:

Round 1 (17.–21. Place)

- USA Ashley Fullerton
- RUS Darja Gorkowa
- RUS Wiktorija Gurowa
- RUS Walerija Popowa
- USA Savanna Wolford

Round 2 (13.–16. Place)

- USA Hailey Fullerton
- TPE Hsu Fang-yu
- USA Vivian Liu
- UKR Daryna Sirantschuk

Round 3 (9.–12. Place)

- PER Nataly Damian
- POL Weronika Karwik
- JPN Okuda Tamami
- USA Jiang Yixia

==== Finals ====
Quarterfinals
1	TPE Chen Chia-hua	9
8	JPN Muramatsu Sakura	3
4	KOR Lee Woo-jin	9
5	KOR Seo Seoa	6
2	USA Alex Booth	0
7	USA April Larson	9
3	RUS Kristina Tkach	9
6	RUS Walerija Truschewskaja	3

Semifinals
TPE Chen Chia-hua	4
KOR Lee Woo-jin	9
USA April Larson	7
RUS Kristina Tkach	9

Finals
KOR Lee Woo-jin	6
RUS Kristina Tkach	9
