= 2016 Treviso Open =

Dynamic Billiard Treviso Open
Tournament information
- Dates: 24–26 November 2017
- Venue: BHR Treviso Hotel,
- City: Treviso
- Country: Italy
- Organisation: Euro Tour
- Format: Single Elimination
- Total prize fund: €36,000
- Winner's share: €4,500

Final
- Champion: (Spain) David Alcaide
- Runner-up: (Germany) Joshua Filler
- Score: 9-6

The 2016 Treviso Open was a Nine-ball pool event, and part of the Euro Tour. The event was held between 24 and 26 November 2016 in the BHR Treviso Hotel in Treviso, Italy.

The winner was David Alcaide. The Spaniard secured his second Euro Tour victory by a 9–6 final win against the German Joshua Filler. Third place went to the Pole Mieszko Fortuński and the Dutch Niels Feijen who won the previous Euro Tour tournament, the 2016 Leende Open

The defending champion was the Englishman Mark Gray, who lost in the round of 16 against Marco Teutscher.

== Tournament results ==
The event saw 163 Participants first in a Double elimination tournament. With 32 players left, the event turned into a Single-elimination tournament.

Round of 32
(England) Mark Gray | 9
(Russia) Sergei Luzker | 6
(England) Imran Majid | 1
(Netherlands) Marco Teutscher | 9
(Spain) Francisco Sánchez | 9
(Poland) Tomasz Kapłan | 0
(Russia) Konstantin Stepanov | 6
(Poland) Mieszko Fortuński | 9
(Poland) Marek Kudlik | 9
(Germany) Ralf Souquet | 7
(Germany) Sascha Trautmann | 5
(Poland) Konrad Juszczyszyn | 9
(Netherlands) Nick van den Berg | 9
(Greece) Damianos Giallourakis | 7
(Spain) David Alcaide | 9
(Russia) Andrei Seroschtan | 3
(France) Stephan Cohen | 5
(Austria) Albin Ouschan | 9
(Poland) Wojciech Sroczyński | 9
(Portugal) Joao Grilo | 8
(Poland) Mateusz Śniegocki | 7
(Germany) Joshua Filler | 9
(Russia) Maxim Dudanez | 9
(Austria) Maximilian Lechner | 8
(Germany) Sebastian Ludwig | 9
(Germany) Sebastian Staab | 3
(Spain) Francisco Díaz-Pizarro | 8
(Austria) Mario He | 9
(Greece) Alexander Kazakis | 9
(Spain) José Delgado | 6
(Czech Republic) Roman Hybler | 4
(Netherlands) Niels Feijen | 9

Round of 16
(England) Mark Gray | 5
(Netherlands) Marco Teutscher | 9
(Spain) Francisco Sánchez | 6
(Poland) Mieszko Fortuński | 9
(Poland) Marek Kudlik | 8
(Poland) Konrad Juszczyszyn | 9
(Netherlands) Nick van den Berg | 4
(Spain) David Alcaide | 9
(Austria) Albin Ouschan | 9
(Poland) Wojciech Sroczyński | 3
(Germany) Joshua Filler | 9
(Russia) Maxim Dudanez | 6
(Germany) Sebastian Ludwig | 9
(Austria) Mario He | 7
(Greece) Alexander Kazakis | 3
(Netherlands) Niels Feijen | 9

Quarterfinal
(Netherlands) Marco Teutscher | 8
(Poland) Mieszko Fortuński | 9
(Poland) Konrad Juszczyszyn | 7
(Spain) David Alcaide | 9
(Austria) Albin Ouschan | 8
(Germany) Joshua Filler | 9
(Germany) Sebastian Ludwig | 8
(Netherlands) Niels Feijen | 9

Semifinal
(Poland) Mieszko Fortuński | 8
(Spain) David Alcaide | 9
(Germany) Joshua Filler | 9
(Netherlands) Niels Feijen | 8

Final
(Spain) David Alcaide | 9
(Germany) Joshua Filler | 6
