= 2016 North Cyprus Open =

Professional pool event, held June 2016

Dynamic Billiard Northern Cyprus Open
Tournament information
- Dates: 2–4 June 2016
- Venue: Acapulco Resort & Convention & Spa
- City: Kyrenia
- Country: Northern Cyprus
- Organisation: Euro Tour
- Format: Single Elimination
- Total prize fund: €36,000
- Winner's share: €4,500

Final
- Champion: (Austria) Mario He
- Runner-up: (Greece) Nikos Ekonomopoulos
- Score: 9-5

The 2016 Dynamic Northern Cyprus Open, was the third Euro Tour 9-Ball pool event in 2016. The event was won by Austria's Mario He who defeated Greece's Nikos Ekonomopoulos 9–5 in the final. In winning the event, He won his first Euro Tour event.

== Tournament format ==
The event saw a total of 143 players compete, in a double-elimination knockout tournament, until the last 32 stage; where the tournament was contested as single elimination.

=== Prize fund ===
The tournament prize fund will be similar to that of other Euro Tour events, with €4,500 for the winner of the event.

	Prize money
Winner	4.500 €
Finalist	€3.000
Semi finalist	€1.750
Quarter finalist	€1.250
last 16	€1.000
Last 32	€500
33–48 Place	€250
Total	€36.000

== Tournament results ==
1st Round
(England) Mark Gray	5
(Spain) David Alcaide	9
(Netherlands) Tim de Ruyter	9
(Netherlands) Marco Teutscher	6
(Sweden) Daniel Tångudd	1
(Greece) Nikos Ekonomopoulos	9
(Netherlands) Marc Bijsterbosch	8
(England) Daryl Peach	9
(Germany) Sebastian Staab	5
(Germany) Sebastian Ludwig	9
(Czech Republic) Roman Hybler	6
(Sweden) Marcus Chamat	9
(Spain) Francisco Díaz-Pizarro	5
(Finland) Mika Immonen	9
(Netherlands) Nick van den Berg	3
(Poland) Tomasz Kapłan	9
(Austria) Albin Ouschan	5
(England) Imran Majid	9
(Poland) Karol Skowerski	9
(Poland) Wojciech Szewczyk	7
(Germany) Oliver Ortmann	9
(Russia) Maksim Dudanets	4
(Poland) Mateusz Śniegocki	7
(Scotland) Jayson Shaw	9
(Poland) Wiktor Zieliński	6
(Germany) Ralf Souquet	9
(Germany) Kevin Becker	9
(Albania) Eklent Kaçi	2
(Denmark) Andreas Madsen	1
(Austria) Mario He	9
(Netherlands) Ivo Aarts	5
(Netherlands) Niels Feijen	9

2nd Round
(Spain) David Alcaide	9
(Netherlands) Tim de Ruyter	1
(Greece) Nikos Ekonomopoulos	9
(England) Daryl Peach	5
(Germany) Sebastian Ludwig	9
(Sweden) Marcus Chamat	5
(Finland) Mika Immonen	9
(Poland) Tomasz Kapłan	2
(England) Imran Majid	5
(Poland) Karol Skowerski	9
(Germany) Oliver Ortmann	7
(Scotland) Jayson Shaw	9
(Germany) Ralf Souquet	9
(Germany) Kevin Becker	5
(Austria) Mario He	9
(Netherlands) Niels Feijen	6

Quarterfinals
(Spain) David Alcaide	3
(Greece) Nikos Ekonomopoulos	9
(Germany) Sebastian Ludwig	6
(Finland) Mika Immonen	9
(Poland) Karol Skowerski	7
(Scotland) Jayson Shaw	9
(Germany) Ralf Souquet	5
(Austria) Mario He	9

Semifinals
(Greece) Nikos Ekonomopoulos	9
(Finland) Mika Immonen	4
(Scotland) Jayson Shaw	4
(Austria) Mario He	9

Finals
(Greece) Nikos Ekonomopoulos	5
(Austria) Mario He	9
