= 2013 World Pool Masters =

World Pool Masters XX
Tournament information
- Dates: 25–27 October 2013
- City: Barnsley
- Country: England
- Organisation: Matchroom Sport
- Format: Invitational event
- Total prize fund: $70,000
- Winner's share: $20,000

Final
- Champion: (Netherlands) Niels Feijen
- Runner-up: (England) Darren Appleton
- Score: 8–6

The 2013 World Pool Masters, also known as World Pool Masters XXI, was a nine-ball pool tournament that took place in Barnsley, England, between 25 and 27 October 2013. It was the 21st edition of the invitational tournament organised by Matchroom Sport. Netherlands' Niels Feijen won the event, defeating Darren Appleton in the final 8–6.

Defending champion Ralf Souquet lost his first round match to Chris Melling 8–3.

== Event prize money ==
	Prize money
Winner	20.000 US$
Runner-up	10.000 US$
Semi-finalist	5.000 US$
Quarter-finalist	2.500 US$
Last 16	2.500 US$
Total	70.000 US$

== Tournament bracket ==
First round
1	(Poland) Karol Skowerski	3
16	(England) Chris Melling	8
8	(Canada) Alex Pagulayan	8
9	(South Korea) Kim Ga-young	2
5	(England) Karl Boyes	6
12	(Netherlands) Niels Feijen	8
4	(Finland) Mika Immonen	8
13	(Philippines) Efren Reyes	6
6	(Germany) Ralf Souquet	2
11	(Greece) Nikos Ekonomopoulos	8
3	(Chinese Taipei) Chang Jung-Lin	8
14	(England) Daryl Peach	6
7	(United States) Shane Van Boening	8
10	(Kuwait) Omar Al-Shaheen	4
2	(England) Darren Appleton	8
15	(Spain) David Alcaide	3

Quarter-finals
(England) Chris Melling	4
(Canada) Alex Pagulayan	8
(Netherlands) Niels Feijen	8
(Finland) Mika Immonen	0
(Greece) Nikos Ekonomopoulos	3
(Chinese Taipei) Chang Jung-Lin	8
(United States) Shane Van Boening	3
(England) Darren Appleton	8

Semi-finals
(Canada) Alex Pagulayan	2
(Netherlands) Niels Feijen	8
(Chinese Taipei) Chang Jung-Lin	4
(England) Darren Appleton	8

Final
(Netherlands) Niels Feijen	8
(England) Darren Appleton	6
