= 2016 Kremlin Cup (pool) =

Russian 10-ball pool tournament, held September 2016

Tournament information
- Dates: 9–12 November 2016
- Venue: Olympic Stadium
- City: Moscow
- Country: Russia
- Format: 10-ball

Final
- Champion: Alexander Kazakis
- Runner-up: Thorsten Hohmann
- Score: 9-6

The 2016 Kremlin Cup was a professional pool tournament in the discipline Ten-ball, held from 9–12 November 2016 in Olympic Stadium in Moscow, Russia.

The winner was Alexander Kazakis, who defeated Thorsten Hohmann 9–6 in the final. Dsmitryj Tschuprou and Ralf Souquet took third place. Ruslan Chinakhov, the winner of the previous two years, was eliminated in the quarter-final against Kazakis.

== Tournament format ==
The event featured 101 participants competing first in a Double-elimination tournament. When there are 32 players remaining, the tournament progressed to a single-elimination tournament. The event was contested as race to eight racks, with the final as a race to 9 racks. The event was played as winner breaks.

== Prize money ==
	Winnings
Winner	640.000 RUB
Runner-up	450.000 RUB
Semi-finalist	251.000 RUB
Quarter-finalist	140.000 RUB
Last 16	65.000 RUB
Last 32	33.000 RUB
Total	3.200.000 RUB

== Results ==
Below is the single elimination round from the last 32 stage onwards.

Last 32
1	(Russia) Ruslan Chinakhov	8
32	(Romania) Babken Melkonyan	3
17	(Spain) David Alcaide	8
16	(Albania) Edmond Zaja	0
9	(Greece) Alexander Kazakis	8
24	(Georgia (country)) Michael Kiladze	2
25	(Russia) Fedor Gorst	8
8	(United States) Corey Deuel	2
5	(Greece) Damianos Giallourakis	2
28	(Belarus) Dsmitryj Tschuprou	8
21	(Russia) Denis Fokin	6
12	(Cyprus) Christos Meligaliotis	8
13	(Iran) Ali Maghsoud	4
20	(Lebanon) Wael Elzein	8
29	(Estonia) Mark Magi	8
4	(Belarus) Uladsislau Les	6
3	(Germany) Thorsten Hohmann	8
30	(Russia) Andrei Seroschtan	7
19	(Spain) Francisco Sánchez Ruiz	8
14	(Russia) Sergei Luzker	2
11	(Denmark) Daniel Kandi	8
22	(Russia) Jewgeni Buslajew	6
27	(Russia) Jewgeni Stalew	1
6	(Russia) Daria Sirotina	8
7	(Russia) Kristina Tkatsch	2
26	(Estonia) Denis Grabe	8
23	(Albania) Eklent Kaçi	5
10	(Germany) Ralf Souquet	8
15	(Russia) Maxim Dudanez	8
18	(Ukraine) Witalij Pazura	1
31	(Finland) Mika Immonen	8
2	(Belarus) Uladsislau Schopik	6

Last 16
(Russia) Ruslan Chinakhov	8
(Spain) David Alcaide	5
(Greece) Alexander Kazakis	8
(Russia) Fedor Gorst	4
(Belarus) Dsmitryj Tschuprou	8
(Cyprus) Christos Meligaliotis	4
(Lebanon) Wael Elzein	8
(Estonia) Mark Magi	7
(Germany) Thorsten Hohmann	8
(Spain) Francisco Sánchez Ruiz	3
(Denmark) Daniel Kandi	8
(Russia) Daria Sirotina	3
(Estonia) Denis Grabe	7
(Germany) Ralf Souquet	8
(Russia) Maxim Dudanez	8
(Finland) Mika Immonen	6

Quarter-final
(Russia) Ruslan Chinakhov	4
(Greece) Alexander Kazakis	8
(Belarus) Dsmitryj Tschuprou	8
(Lebanon) Wael Elzein	4
(Germany) Thorsten Hohmann	8
(Denmark) Daniel Kandi	4
(Germany) Ralf Souquet	8
(Russia) Maxim Dudanez	5

Semi-final
(Greece) Alexander Kazakis	8
(Belarus) Dsmitryj Tschuprou	3
(Germany) Thorsten Hohmann	8
(Germany) Ralf Souquet	6

Final
(Greece) Alexander Kazakis	9
(Germany) Thorsten Hohmann	6
