= 2021 in Gibraltar =

Events in the year 2021 in Gibraltar.

== Incumbents ==
- Monarch: Elizabeth II
- Chief Minister: Fabian Picardo

== Events ==
Ongoing: COVID-19 pandemic in Gibraltar

- 24 June: The 2021 Gibraltar abortion referendum passes.
- The Manchester 62 F.C. Womens association football club is revived.

== Sports ==
- 27 March: Alexander Povetkin vs. Dillian Whyte II at the Europa Point Sports Complex
- 22 – 25 May: 2021 World Pool Masters
