= 2022 World Pool Masters =

Professional 9-Ball Pool event

World Pool Masters

Tournament information
- Dates: 5–8 May 2022
- Venue: Europa Point Sports Complex
- City: Gibraltar
- Organisation: Matchroom Sport
- Total prize fund: $100,000
- Winner's share: $25,000

Final
- Champion: Joshua Filler (GER)
- Runner-up: Lo Ho Sum (HKG)
- Score: 9-6

The 2022 World Pool Masters was a nine-ball pool tournament which took place in Gibraltar from 5–8 May 2022. It was the 28th edition of the World Pool Masters invitational tournament organised by Matchroom Pool.

== Format ==
The event was played as a single elimination tournament, with players competing in a preliminary round based on rankings. The tournament prize fund was the same as of the last edition, with a total prize fund of $100,000. The total prize money awarded is listed below:

Place	Prize money
Preliminary round	$1,750
Last 16	$2,250
Quarter-finalist	$3,750
Semi-finalist	$7,500
Finalist	$13,000
Winner	$25,000
Total	$100,000

== Main draw ==
The following table denotes the event's draw and results. Numbers to the left of a player's names indicates their seeding, whilst bolding indicates the winner of a match. Chang Yu-lung and Omar Al-Shaheen withdrew on May 2 due to travel issues and were replaced by Mario He and Mika Immonen.

Preliminary Round; First to 7 racks
9	Eklent Kaçi (ALB)	4
10	Dennis Orcollo (PHI)	7
11	Olivér Szolnoki (HUN)	3
12	Skyler Woodward (USA)	7
13	Mario He (AUT)	3
14	Dimitri Jungo (SWI)	7
15	Ko Pin-yi (TPE)	7
16	Ko Ping-chung (TPE)	4
17	Francisco Sánchez Ruiz (SPA)	7
18	Mika Immonen (FIN)	5
19	Mieszko Fortuński (POL)	7
20	Jayson Shaw (GBR)	2
21	Abdullah Alyousef (KUW)	7
22	Niels Feijen (HOL)	2
23	Lo Ho Sum (HKG)	7
24	Denis Grabe (EST)	4

Last 16; First to 7 racks
1	Alexander Kazakis (GRE)	0
10	Dennis Orcollo (PHI)	7
8	Joshua Filler (GER)	7
12	Skyler Woodward (USA)	1
5	Max Lechner (AUT)	7
14	Dimitri Jungo (SWI)	2
4	David Alcaide (SPA)	3
15	Ko Pin-yi (TPE)	7
3	Albin Ouschan (AUT)	5
17	Francisco Sánchez Ruiz (SPA)	7
6	Aloysius Yapp (SIN)	4
19	Mieszko Fortuński (POL)	7
7	Naoyuki Ōi (JPN)	3
21	Abdullah Alyousef (KUW)	7
2	Shane Van Boening (USA)	6
23	Lo Ho Sum (HKG)	7

Quarterfinals; First to 7 racks
10	Dennis Orcollo (PHI)	0
8	Joshua Filler (GER)	7
5	Max Lechner (AUT)	2
15	Ko Pin-yi (TPE)	7
17	Francisco Sánchez Ruiz (SPA)	4
19	Mieszko Fortuński (POL)	7
21	Abdullah Alyousef (KUW)	6
23	Lo Ho Sum (HKG)	7

Semifinals; First to 7 racks
8	Joshua Filler (GER)	7
15	Ko Pin-yi (TPE)	3
19	Mieszko Fortuński (POL)	5
23	Lo Ho Sum (HKG)	7

Final; First to 9 racks
8	Joshua Filler (GER)	9
23	Lo Ho Sum (HKG)	6
