= 2016 Albanian Open =

Tournament information
- Dates: 5–7 August
- Venue: Tirana Expo Center
- City: Tirana
- Country: Albania
- Organisation: Euro Tour
- Format: Single Elimination, Double elimination
- Total prize fund: €38,000
- Winner's share: €4,500

Final
- Champion: POL Mateusz Śniegocki
- Runner-up: GER Joshua Filler

The Dynamic Billard Albanian Open 2016 was a 9-Ball pool tournament, and the fourth Euro Tour event of 2016. The event was held between 5–7 August 2016, at the Tirana Expo Center in Tirana, Albania. The event was won by Mateusz Śniegocki, who defeated Joshua Filler 9–4 in the final.

== Tournament format ==
The event was played as a double elimination knockout tournament, until the last 32 stage; where the tournament was contested as a single elimination bracket. Matches were all played as a race to 9 racks.

=== Prize fund ===
The tournament prize fund was similar to that of other Euro Tour events, with €4,500 awarded to the winner of the event.

	Prize money
Winner	4.500 €
Finalist	€3.000
Semi finalist	€1.750
Quarter finalist	€1.250
last 16	€1.000
Last 32	€600
33–48	€275
Total	€38.000

== Tournament results ==
1st Round
(England) Mark Gray	9
(Sweden) Andreas Gerwen	3
(Poland) Radosław Babica	5
(Spain) Francisco Sánchez	9
(Finland) Mika Immonen	7
(Germany) Joshua Filler	9
(Austria) Maximilian Lechner	8
(Netherlands) Nick van den Berg	9
(Russia) Konstantin Stepanov	9
(Portugal) Joao Grilo	8
(Spain) David Alcaide	9
(England) Daryl Peach	3
(Russia) Ruslan Tschinachow	9
(Netherlands) Ivo Aarts	6
(Greece) Nikos Ekonomopoulos	5
(Poland) Wiktor Zieliński	9
(Austria) Albin Ouschan	9
(Albania) Edmond Zaja	5
(Croatia) Ivica Putnik	8
(Sweden) Marcus Chamat	9
(Spain) Francisco Díaz-Pizarro	6
(Albania) Eklent Kaçi	9
(England) Imran Majid	3
(Poland) Mateusz Śniegocki	9
(Poland) Konrad Juszczyszyn	9
(Germany) Sebastian Ludwig	5
(Bosnia and Herzegovina) Sanjin Pehlivanović	9
(Norway) Mats Schjetne	8
(Poland) Wojciech Szewczyk	9
(Finland) Petri Makkonen	6
(Poland) Mieszko Fortuński	5
(Netherlands) Niels Feijen	9

2nd Round
(England) Mark Gray	9
(Spain) Francisco Sánchez	7
(Germany) Joshua Filler	9
(Netherlands) Nick van den Berg	8
(Russia) Konstantin Stepanov	3
(Spain) David Alcaide	9
(Russia) Ruslan Tschinachow	9
(Poland) Wiktor Zieliński	2
(Austria) Albin Ouschan	7
(Sweden) Marcus Chamat	9
(Albania) Eklent Kaçi	6
(Poland) Mateusz Śniegocki	9
(Poland) Konrad Juszczyszyn	9
(Bosnia and Herzegovina) Sanjin Pehlivanović	2
(Poland) Wojciech Szewczyk	9
(Netherlands) Niels Feijen	7

Quarterfinals
(England) Mark Gray	2
(Germany) Joshua Filler	9
(Spain) David Alcaide	5
(Russia) Ruslan Tschinachow	9
(Sweden) Marcus Chamat	3
(Poland) Mateusz Śniegocki	9
(Poland) Konrad Juszczyszyn	4
(Poland) Wojciech Szewczyk	9

Semifinals
(Germany) Joshua Filler	9
(Russia) Ruslan Tschinachow	3
(Poland) Mateusz Śniegocki	9
(Poland) Wojciech Szewczyk	7

Finals
(Germany) Joshua Filler	4
(Poland) Mateusz Śniegocki	9
