= 2012 World Pool Masters =

World Pool Masters XX
Tournament information
- Dates: 5–7 October 2012
- City: Kielce
- Country: Poland
- Organisation: Matchroom Sport
- Format: Invitational event
- Total prize fund: $70,000
- Winner's share: $20,000

Final
- Champion: (Poland) Karol Skowerski
- Runner-up: (Poland) Mateusz Śniegocki
- Score: 8–6

The 2012 World Pool Masters, also known as World Pool Masters XX, was a nine-ball pool tournament that took place in Kielce, Poland between 5–7 October 2012. It was the 20nd edition of the invitational tournament organised by Matchroom Sport. Poland's Karol Skowerski won the event, defeating Mateusz Śniegocki in the final 8–6.

Defending champion Ralf Souquet lost his first round match to eventual runner-up Mateusz Śniegocki.

== Event prize money ==
	Prize money
Winner	20.000 US$
Runner-up	10.000 US$
Semi-finalist	5.000 US$
Quarter-finalist	2.500 US$
Last 16	2.500 US$
Total	70.000 US$

== Tournament bracket ==
Round 1; 5-6 October 2012
1	(Germany) Ralf Souquet	6
(Poland) Mateusz Śniegocki	8
8	(Canada) Alex Pagulayan	8
(India) Raj Hundal	6
5	(Finland) Mika Immonen	8
(Poland) Radosław Babica	7
4	(Philippines) Dennis Orcollo	8
(England) Kelly Fisher	6
3	(Chinese Taipei) Ko Pin-yi	7
(Poland) Wojciech Szewczyk	8
6	(Netherlands) Nick van den Berg	8
(Kuwait) Omar Al-Shaheen	4
7	(United States) Shane Van Boening	2
(Poland) Karol Skowerski	8
2	(England) Darren Appleton	6
(Malta) Tony Drago	8

Quarterfinal; 6-7 October 2012
(Poland) Mateusz Śniegocki	8
8	(Canada) Alex Pagulayan	6
5	(Finland) Mika Immonen	3
4	(Philippines) Dennis Orcollo	8
(Poland) Wojciech Szewczyk	2
6	(Netherlands) Nick van den Berg	8
(Poland) Karol Skowerski	8
(Malta) Tony Drago	3

Semifinal; 7 October 2012
(Poland) Mateusz Śniegocki	8
4	(Philippines) Dennis Orcollo	6
6	(Netherlands) Nick van den Berg	6
(Poland) Karol Skowerski	8

Final; 7 October 2012
(Poland) Mateusz Śniegocki	6
(Poland) Karol Skowerski	8
