= 2021 World Pool Masters =

Professional 9-Ball Pool event

World Pool Masters
Tournament information
- Dates: 22–25 May 2021
- Venue: Europa Point Sports Complex
- City: Gibraltar
- Organisation: Matchroom Sport
- Total prize fund: $100,000
- Winner's share: $25,000

Final
- Champion: Alexander Kazakis (GRE)
- Runner-up: Shane Van Boening (USA)
- Score: 9–0

The 2021 World Pool Masters was a nine-ball pool tournament which took place in Gibraltar from 22–25 May 2021. It was the 27th edition of the World Pool Masters invitational tournament organised by Matchroom Pool. 2019's runner-up Alexander Kazakis won the event, defeating former winner Shane Van Boening in the final 9–0. The reigning champion was David Alcaide, but he was defeated in his first match by Skyler Woodward.

== Format ==
The event was played as a single elimination tournament, with players competing in a preliminary round based on rankings. The tournament prize fund was the same as of the last edition, with a total prize fund of $100,000. The event winner was awarded $25,000. The total prize money awarded is listed below:

Place	Prize money
Preliminary round	$1,750
Last 16	$2,250
Quarter-finalist	$3,750
Semi-finalist	$7,500
Finalist	$13,000
Winner	$25,000
Total	$100,000

== Main draw ==
The following table denotes the event's draw and results. Numbers to the left of a player's names indicates their seeding, whilst bolding indicates the winner of a match.

Preliminary Round; First to 7 racks
17	Billy Thorpe (USA)	1
16	Skyler Woodward (USA)	7
9	Kelly Fisher (ENG)	3
24	Justin Sajich (AUS)	7
21	Eklent Kaçi (ALB)	7
12	Petri Makkonen (FIN)	3
13	Niels Feijen (NED)	7
20	Jeff de Luna (PHL)	3
19	Shane Van Boening (USA)	7
14	Jakub Koniar (SVK)	4
11	Mieszko Fortuński (POL)	7
22	Kristina Tkach (RUS)	2
23	Chris Melling (ENG)	7
10	Sanjin Pehlivanović (BIH)	4
15	Denis Grabe (EST)	7
18	Roberto Gomez (PHI)	6

Last 16; First to 7 racks
1	David Alcaide (ESP)	3
16	Skyler Woodward (USA)	7
8	Alexander Kazakis (GRE)	7
24	Justin Sajich (AUS)	3
5	Naoyuki Ōi (JPN)	5
21	Eklent Kaçi (ALB)	7
4	Jayson Shaw (SCO)	6
13	Niels Feijen (NED)	7
3	Fedor Gorst (RUS)	1
19	Shane Van Boening (USA)	7
6	Max Lechner (AUT)	7
11	Mieszko Fortuński (POL)	5
7	Joshua Filler (GER)	7
23	Chris Melling (ENG)	5
2	Albin Ouschan (AUT)	3
15	Denis Grabe (EST)	7

Quarterfinals; First to 7 racks
16	Skyler Woodward (USA)	3
8	Alexander Kazakis (GRE)	7
21	Eklent Kaçi (ALB)	7
13	Niels Feijen (NED)	0
19	Shane Van Boening (USA)	7
6	Max Lechner (AUT)	4
7	Joshua Filler (GER)	7
15	Denis Grabe (EST)	5

Semifinals; First to 7 racks
8	Alexander Kazakis (GRE)	7
21	Eklent Kaçi (ALB)	6
19	Shane Van Boening (USA)	7
7	Joshua Filler (GER)	6

Final; First to 9 racks
8	Alexander Kazakis (GRE)	9
19	Shane Van Boening (USA)	0
