= 2023 WPA Women's World Nine-ball Championship =

2023 Kamui WPA Women's World Nine-ball Championship
Tournament information
- Dates: 19–22 January 2023
- Venue: Harrah's Resort Atlantic City
- City: Atlantic City
- Country: United States
- Organisation: World Pool-Billiard Association
- Format: Double elimination / single elimination
- Discipline: Nine-ball
- Total prize fund: $148,000
- Winner's share: $30,000
- Participants: 64
- Defending champion: Kelly Fisher

Final
- Champion: Chou Chieh-yu (TPE)
- Runner-up: Allison Fisher (GBR)
- Score: 9–0

The 2023 Kamui WPA Women's World Nine-ball Championship was a professional nine-ball pool championship that took place from 19 to 22 January 2023. Sponsored by cue sports accessory manufacturer Kamui, it was the 30th edition of the WPA Women's World Nine-ball Championship. It was held at Harrah's Resort in Atlantic City, USA. This marked the return of the event after a three-year hiatus due to the COVID-19 pandemic. Chou Chieh-yu won her first nine-ball world title, defeating Allison Fisher 9–0 in the final.

== Prize money ==
The total prize fund for the event was $148,000, with the winner receiving $30,000.

Position	Prize money
Winner	$30,000
Runner-up	$20,000
Semi-finalist	$12,000
5th–8th Place	$6,500
9th–16th Place	$4,000
17th–32nd Place	$2,000
Total	$148,000

== Knockout stage ==
The results from the Round of 16 onwards are shown below. Players in bold denote match winners.

Round of 16
**Kelly Fisher (GBR)**	**9**
Pia Filler (GER)	1
**Seo Seoa (KOR)**	**9**
Chen Siming (CHN)	3
**Chou Chieh-yu (TPE)**	**9**
Lee Woo-jin (KOR)	8
**Jin Hye-ju (KOR)**	**9**
Wei Tzu-chien (TPE)	5
**Allison Fisher (GBR)**	**9**
Marharyta Fefilava (BLR)	2
**Chezka Centeno (PHI)**	**9**
Eylül Kibaroğlu (TUR)	4
**Kristina Tkach (RUS)**	**9**
Yuki Hiraguchi (JPN)	5
**Jasmin Ouschan (AUT)**	**9**
Rubilen Amit (PHI)	3

Quarter-finals
Kelly Fisher (GBR)	8
**Seo Seoa (KOR)**	**9**
**Chou Chieh-yu (TPE)**	**9**
Jin Hye-ju (KOR)	2
**Allison Fisher (GBR)**	**9**
Chezka Centeno (PHI)	7
**Kristina Tkach (RUS)**	**9**
Jasmin Ouschan (AUT)	5

Semi-finals
Seo Seoa (KOR)	7
**Chou Chieh-yu (TPE)**	**9**
**Allison Fisher (GBR)**	**9**
Kristina Tkach (RUS)	5

Final
**Chou Chieh-yu (TPE)**	**9**
Allison Fisher (GBR)	0
