= 2011 World Pool Masters =

World Pool Masters XIX
Tournament information
- Dates: 3–5 September 2011
- City: Quezon City
- Country: Philippines
- Organisation: Matchroom Sport
- Format: Invitational event
- Total prize fund: $70,000
- Winner's share: $20,000

Final
- Champion: (Germany) Ralf Souquet
- Runner-up: (Philippines) Dennis Orcollo
- Score: 8–5

The 2011 World Pool Masters, also known as World Pool Masters XIX, was a nine-ball pool tournament that took place in Quezon City, Philippines, between 3–5 September 2011. It was the 19th edition of the invitational tournament organised by Matchroom Sport.

Germany's Ralf Souquet won the event, defeating Dennis Orcollo in the final 8–5. In winning the event, Ralf Souquet won his sixth World Pool Masters title.

== Event prize money ==
	Prize money
Winner	20.000 US$
Runner-up	10.000 US$
Semi-finalist	5.000 US$
Quarter-finalist	2.500 US$
Last 16	2.500 US$
Total	70.000 US$

== Tournament bracket ==
First round
1	(Philippines) Dennis Orcollo	8
16	(Malta) Tony Drago	2
8	(Chinese Taipei) Chang Jung-lin	8
9	(United States) Shane Van Boening	3
5	(England) Chris Melling	4
12	(China) Fu Jianbo	8
4	(Philippines) Francisco Bustamante	4
13	(Canada) Jason Klatt	8
6	(Netherlands) Huidji See	7
11	(Philippines) Lee Vann Corteza	8
3	(Germany) Ralf Souquet	8
14	(Finland) Mika Immonen	7
7	(England) Darren Appleton	8
10	(Philippines) Efren Reyes	5
2	(Japan) Yukio Akakariyama	3
15	(India) Raj Hundal	8

Quarter-finals
(Philippines) Dennis Orcollo	8
(Chinese Taipei) Chang Jung-lin	1
(China) Fu Jianbo	8
(Canada) Jason Klatt	5
(Philippines) Lee Vann Corteza	6
(Germany) Ralf Souquet	8
(England) Darren Appleton	8
(India) Raj Hundal	4

Semi-finals
(Philippines) Dennis Orcollo	8
(China) Fu Jianbo	4
(Germany) Ralf Souquet	8
(England) Darren Appleton	7

Final
(Philippines) Dennis Orcollo	5
(Germany) Ralf Souquet	8
