= Kristina Grim =

German pool player (born 1991)

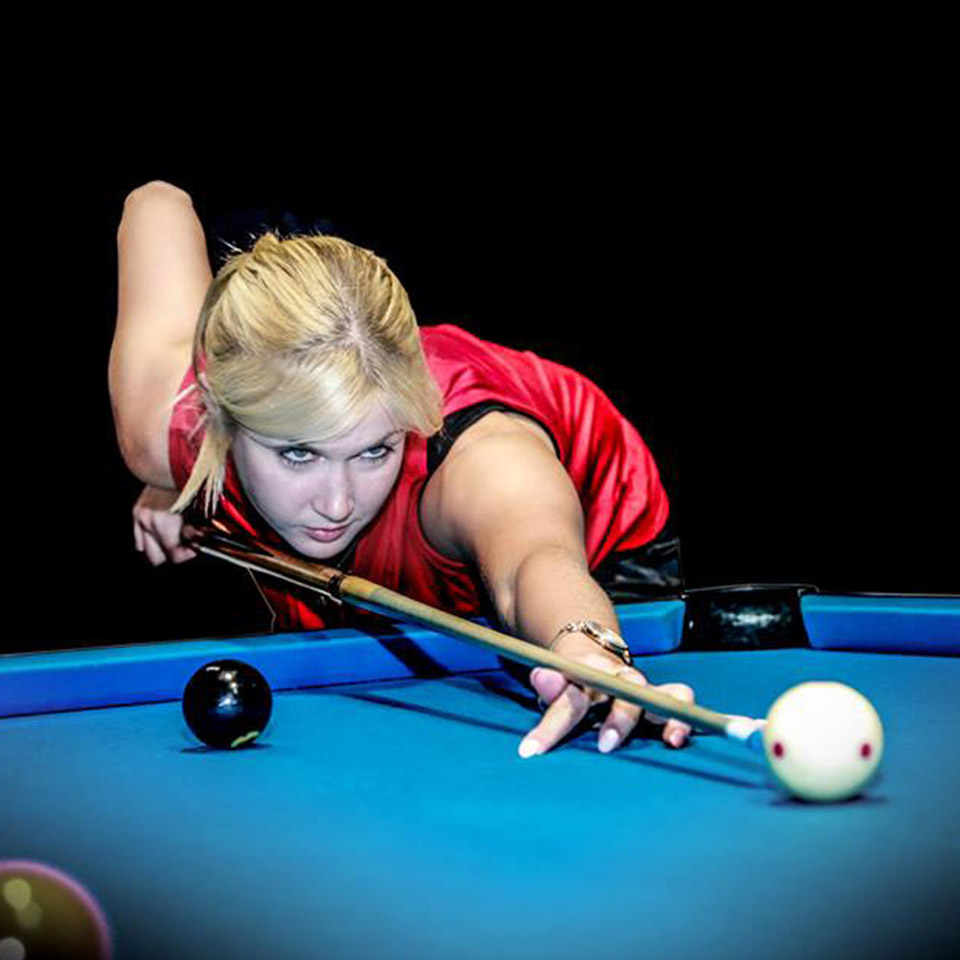

Personal information
- Nickname: "Kiki"
- Born: 10 August 1991 (age 34) Munich, Germany

Pool career
- Country: Germany
- Turned pro: 2005
- Pool games: 9-Ball, 8-Ball
- Highest rank: 38

Kristina Grim (born 10 August 1991) is a German professional pool player. She is part of the German national pool team. Grim participates especially in the disciplines of both eight-ball and nine-ball. She is currently the second-highest-ranked female German pool player.

== Career ==
Kristina Grim turned professional in 2005. As a youth player, she played for PBV Atlantis in Bruckmühl and 1. Billardverein in Rosenheim. After progressing from the youth to adult classes, Grim joined PBC Dreieich Sprendlingen in Frankfurt. At the German Pool Championships in 2013 Grim won her first national championship in 8-ball. In the final she defeated Ina Kaplan 7–3. The following year, Grim won the Grand Prix event in 8-ball. In 2015 Grim took first place in the rankings for the German Tour.

Since winning the German championship in 2013, Kristina Grim is a regular member of the German national pool team and regularly competes in the European Pool Championships. In 2016 she won her first medal at the European championships, where she reached the semi-finals of the 9-ball event, before losing to Diana Khodjaeva 7–4. Grim has competed in the Euro Tour, reaching a high ranking of 49 after the 2016 North Cyprus Open.

== Personal life ==
Grim lives in Karlsruhe and works as air traffic controller for Deutsche Flugsicherung.
