= Ina Kaplan =

German pool player (born 1987)

Personal information
- Born: 14 May 1987 (age 39) Essen, Germany

Pool career
- Country: Germany
- Turned pro: 2007

Tournament wins
- Minor: 3x Euro Tour
- Highest rank: 1 (Euro Tour)

Ina Kaplan (née Jentschura; born 14 May 1987) is a German professional pool player. She is an eleven-time German national champion and is the second female player (after Franziska Stark) to win three of four disciplines in one event at the championships.

In 2010, Kaplan reached the final of the European Pool Championships in ten-ball, finishing as runner-up behind Jasmin Ouschan. In the Women's Euro Tour, Kaplan won events in 2013, 2014, and 2017 and finished three times as a runner-up. Kaplan is third on the all-time list of winners in the tour, behind Ouschan and Kristina Tkach with a total of 12 medals from the events. Kaplan also promotes pool events, usually women's events. She is married to fellow German pool player Jörn Kaplan. They share a professional pool club, where she was the first woman to play in the highest tier of German club pool, the 1st Bundesliga.

== Early life ==
Kaplan began playing billiards on a family holiday in the Netherlands at the age of 12. However, she did not play pool until she was 16, playing at a pub for free on Monday nights. Later, Kaplan was asked to join a pool club; she joined BSV Essen and would later play professionally for the club.

== Career ==
=== 2007–2011 ===
In the 2007 German Championship, Kaplan reached the eight-ball quarter-finals for the first time. The following season, she reached the semi-final of the same event. In 2009, Kaplan won her first national championship with victories against Kim Witzel and Simone Künzl in eight-ball and nine-ball, respectively.

In March 2010, Kaplan participated at the European Pool Championships for the first time. She reached the semi-final in the nine-ball event and the final in the ten-ball event to face Jasmin Ouschan, where she lost 7–4. At the 2011 European Pool Championships, Kaplan reached the round of 16 in both ten-ball and straight pool.

=== 2012–2014 ===
In 2012, Kaplan reached her first final in the Women's Euro Tour, finishing as runner-up at the 2012 Treviso Open in Guimarães. The following season, Kaplan reached the semi-final of the 2013 Italian Open and entered her first world championship, where she reached the knockout rounds of the 2013 WPA World Nine-ball Championship. In November 2013, Kaplan played at the 2013 WPA Women's World Ten-ball Championship, reaching the round of 32.

In the Euro Tour, Kaplan reached the semi-final of the 2013 Austria Open before winning jer first Tour tournament at the 2013 Treviso Open. In the 2014 European Championship, she finished as runner-up in nine-ball, losing to Katarzyna Wesolowska in the final 2–6. In the 2014 German Championship, Kaplan became the second female German player (after Franziska Stark in 1991) to win three disciplines in the same year, with wins in straight pool, nine-ball, and ten-ball, doing so whilst six months pregnant. In addition, she reached the final in eight-ball, losing to Melanie Suessenguth.

Since 2011, Kaplan has played at billiards club BC Siegtal 89. She played with the team in the 1st Bundesliga, becoming the first woman to play in the highest German pool league. Kaplan competed in the 1st Bundesliga while pregnant in 2014.

In the 2014 Team World Championship, Kaplan represented Germany alongside Thorsten Hohmann, Ralf Souquet, and Sebastian Staab. The team defeated Austria 4–2 and South Africa 6–0 to finish second in its group, behind Great Britain. In the second round, the team defeated Russia 4–2, tied 3–3 with Japan, and lost 5–7 to Japan on a shootout.

=== 2015–present ===
Since 2015, Kaplan has played in numerous Euro Tour events. In 2017, her most successful year, she reached the semi-finals in both the Portugal and Klagenfurt Opens, before winning the Italian Open.

== Overall record ==
Overall, Kaplan is a three-time Euro Tour winner, having won the 2013 Treviso Open, 2014 Luxembourg Open, and the 2017 Treviso Open. She also has reached the final on three occasions and reached number one in the rankings on three occasions, first in 2013, and most recently in 2017. As of 2019, Kaplan is third on the all-time list of winners on the tour, behind Jasmin Ouschan and Kristina Tkach. With a total of 11 German national titles, Kaplan is second in all-time winners behind Franziska Stark. By event, she has won nine-ball on five occasions, ten-ball on three, eight-ball twice, and straight pool once.

== Personal life ==
Kaplan works as a research assistant in the Department of German Studies of the University of Siegen. She has also organized her own pool tournaments. In 2014, Kaplan organized the Autohaus Keller Cup, an eight-women tournament played inside the City-Galerie mall in Siegen. Kristina Grim won the event, but Kaplan won the second event held the following year. The events notably allowed players to not adhere to the standard WPA dresscode, with players being encouraged to "dress elegantly".

In 2012, Kaplan married pool player Jörn Kaplan, with whom she won the 2014 German Mixed Championship. The couple have one child.

== Titles ==
- 2026 European Pool Championship 9-ball
- 2026 European Pool Championship 10-ball
- 2021 European Pool Championships 14.1
- 2022 Euro Tour St. Johann im Pongau Open
- 2017 Euro Tour Treviso Open
- 2014 Euro Tour Luxembourg Open
- 2013 Euro Tour Treviso Open
