= 2013 WPA Women's World Nine-ball Championship =

Tournament information
- Dates: 9–12 August 2013
- Venue: Richgate Shopping Center
- City: Shenyang
- Country: China
- Organisation: World Pool-Billiard Association
- Format: Double elimination / single elimination
- Discipline: Nine-ball
- Total prize fund: $160,000
- Winner's share: $40,000

Final
- Champion: Han Yu (CHN)
- Runner-up: Lin Yuan-chun (TPE)
- Score: 9–1

The 2013 WPA Women's World Nine-ball Championship was a professional nine-ball pool championship that took place from 9 to 12 August 2013. It was the 22nd edition of the WPA Women's World Nine-ball Championship and was held at the Richgate Shopping Center in Shenyang, China. The tournament featured a field of 64 players, with a preliminary double-elimination stage followed by a single-elimination tournament bracket for the final 32 players. The event was sanctioned by the World Pool-Billiard Association (WPA). Han Yu won her first world title, defeating Lin Yuan-chun 9–1 in the final.

== Prize money ==
The total prize fund for the event was $160,000, with the winner receiving $40,000. A breakdown of the prize money is shown below:

Position	Prize money
Winner	$40,000
Runner-up	$20,000
Semi-finalist	$10,000
Quarter-finalist	$6,000
Last 16	$3,000
Last 32	$1,500
Last 64	$750
Total	$160,000

== Knockout stage ==
The following is the results from the knockout stage of the event. Players in bold denote match winners.

Round of 16
**Chen Siming (CHN)**	**9**
Karen Corr (IRL)	3
**Lin Yuan-chun (TPE)**	**9**
Kim Ga-young (KOR)	7
**Tsai Pei-chen (TPE)**	**9**
Akimi Kajitani (JPN)	7
**Liu Shasha (CHN)**	**9**
Bi Zhu Qing (CHN)	3
Kelly Fisher (GBR)	8
**Tan Ho-yun (TPE)**	**9**
Chihiro Kawahara (JPN)	3
**Wei Tzu-chien (TPE)**	**9**
Chen Xue (CHN)	8
**Han Yu (CHN)**	**9**
**Allison Fisher (GBR)**	**9**
Wu Jing (CHN)	5

Quarter-finals
Chen Siming (CHN)	6
**Lin Yuan-chun (TPE)**	**9**
Tsai Pei-chen (TPE)	7
**Liu Shasha (CHN)**	**9**
**Tan Ho-yun (TPE)**	**9**
Wei Tzu-chien (TPE)	8
**Han Yu (CHN)**	**9**
Allison Fisher (GBR)	5

Semi-finals
**Lin Yuan-chun (TPE)**	**9**
Liu Shasha (CHN)	6
Tan Ho-yun (TPE)	6
**Han Yu (CHN)**	**9**

Final
Lin Yuan-chun (TPE)	1
**Han Yu (CHN)**	**9**
