= 2016 WPA World Nine-ball Junior Championship =

World Junior pool championship, held November 2016

2017 WPA World Nine-ball Juniors Championship
Tournament information
- Dates: 16 November–20 November 2016
- Venue: Huimin Middle School
- City: Shanghai
- Country: China
- Organisation: WPA
- Format: double elimination, single elimination

Final
- Champion: Zheng Xiaohuai (U17); Kong Dejing (boys); Chen Chia-hua (girls)

The 2016 WPA World Nine-ball Junior Championship was a professional youth 9-Ball World championship held between 16 and 20 November 2016. The event was won by Zheng Xiaohuai in the Under 17 with a 8–5 final victory against Enkhbold Temuujin. In the age group Under 19, two former Under 17 World Champions met in Kong Dejing and Daniel Macioł the final. Kong won the match and the title 11–2. In the girls event, Chen Chia-hua met compatriot Tsai Pei-chun in the final, winning 9–8.

== Winners ==
Wettbewerb	Winner	Runner-up	Semi-finalists
Under 17s	(China) Zheng Xiaohuai	(Mongolia) Enkhbold Temuujin	(Poland) Wiktor Zieliński
Under 17s	(China) Zheng Xiaohuai	(Mongolia) Enkhbold Temuujin	(Bosnia and Herzegovina) Sanjin Pehlivanović
Under 19s boys	(China) Kong Dejing	(Poland) Daniel Macioł	(Germany) Patrick Hofmann
Under 19s boys	(China) Kong Dejing	(Poland) Daniel Macioł	(Russia) Maxim Dudanez
Under 19s girls	(Chinese Taipei) Chen Chia-hua	(Chinese Taipei) Tsai Pei-chun	(Belgium) Diana Khodjaeva
Under 19s girls	(Chinese Taipei) Chen Chia-hua	(Chinese Taipei) Tsai Pei-chun	(China) Wu Yumei

== Tournament format ==
All three competitions were first held in the Double-elimination tournament with a Single-elimination tournament from the quarter-finals onwards. The events were all played as winner breaks.

== Results ==
=== Under 17 boys ===
Quarterfinals
1	(Poland) Wiktor Zieliński	8
8	(Malaysia) Muhammad Yakup	2
4	(China) Zheng Xiaohuai	8
5	(Hong Kong) Robbie Capito	5
2	(Bosnia and Herzegovina) Sanjin Pehlivanović	8
7	(Bonaire) Gyairon Martis	6
3	(Mongolia) Enkhbold Temuujin	8
6	(Lithuania) Kestutis Zadeikis	6

Semifinals
(Poland) Wiktor Zieliński	7
(China) Zheng Xiaohuai	8
(Bosnia and Herzegovina) Sanjin Pehlivanović	4
(Mongolia) Enkhbold Temuujin	8

Finals
(China) Zheng Xiaohuai	8
(Mongolia) Enkhbold Temuujin	5

=== Under 19 boys ===
Quarterfinals
1	(Germany) Patrick Hofmann	11
8	(United States) Nathan Diederich	10
4	(Chinese Taipei) Ko Ping-han	9
5	(China) Kong Dejing	11
2	(Poland) Daniel Macioł	11
7	(Hong Kong) Lo Ho Sum	8
3	(Venezuela) Jesus Atencio	6
6	(Russia) Maxim Dudanez	11

Semifinals
(Germany) Patrick Hofmann	8
(China) Kong Dejing	11
(Poland) Daniel Macioł	11
(Russia) Maxim Dudanez	10

Finals
(China) Kong Dejing	11
(Poland) Daniel Macioł	2

=== Girls ===
Quarterfinals
1	(China) Shi Tianqi	6
8	(Belgium) Diana Khodjaeva	9
4	(China) Liu Xiazhi	5
5	(Chinese Taipei) Chen Chia-hua	9
2	(China) Ma Jiao	7
7	(China) Wu Yumei	9
3	(Chinese Taipei) Fan Yu-hsuan	3
6	(Chinese Taipei) Tsai Pei-chun	9

Semifinals
(Belgium) Diana Khodjaeva	3
(Chinese Taipei) Chen Chia-hua	9
(China) Wu Yumei	7
(Chinese Taipei) Tsai Pei-chun	9

Finals
(Chinese Taipei) Chen Chia-hua	9
(Chinese Taipei) Tsai Pei-chun	8
