= Wang Xiaotong (pool player) =

Chinese pool player

Personal information
- Nationality: Chinese
- Born: China

Pool career
- Turned pro: 2013–present
- Best finish: Runner-up: WPA Women's World Nine-ball Championship (2018)

Wang Xiaotong (Chinese: 王晓彤, also Xiao Tong Wang) is a Chinese professional pool player. She was the runner-up at the 2018 WPA Women's World Nine-ball Championship, being defeated in the final by Han Yu. In 2023, she reached the final of the All Japan Championship, and the China 9-Ball Open.
