= 2017 World Pool Masters =

World Pool Masters XXIV
Tournament information
- Dates: 17–19 February 2017
- Venue: Tercentenary Sports Hall, Victoria Stadium
- City: Gibraltar
- Organisation: Matchroom Sport
- Format: Invitational event
- Total prize fund: $80,000
- Winner's share: $20,000

Final
- Champion: (Spain) David Alcaide
- Runner-up: (Scotland) Jayson Shaw
- Score: 8–7

The 2017 World Pool Masters, also known as World Pool Masters XXIV, was a nine-ball pool tournament that took place in Gibraltar between 17 and 19 February 2017. It was the 24th edition of the invitational tournament organised by Matchroom Sport.

The defending champion Shane Van Boening reached the second round, but was defeated by David Alcaide. Alcaide won the event, defeating Scotland's Jayson Shaw 8–7 in the final.

== Tournament prize money ==
	Prize money
Winner	20.000 US$
Runner-up	10.000 US$
Semi-finalist	5.000 US$
Quarter-finalist	4.000 US$
First round loser	3.000 US$
Total	80.000 US$

== Tournament bracket ==
First round
1	(United States) Shane Van Boening	8
(Spain) Francisco Sánchez	2
8	(Spain) David Alcaide	8
(Germany) Ralf Souquet	3
5	(Austria) Albin Ouschan	8
(Finland) Mika Immonen	6
4	(Chinese Taipei) Cheng Yu-hsuan	6
(Japan) Naoyuki Ōi	8
3	(Scotland) Jayson Shaw	8
(Poland) Wojciech Szewczyk	3
6	(Canada) Alex Pagulayan	8
(Gibraltar) Stephen Webber	1
7	(Netherlands) Niels Feijen	3
(Kuwait) Omar Al-Shaheen	8
2	(Chinese Taipei) Chang Jung-Lin	8
(England) Mark Gray	6

Quarterfinals
1	(United States) Shane Van Boening	3
8	(Spain) David Alcaide	8
5	(Austria) Albin Ouschan	8
(Japan) Naoyuki Ōi	4
3	(Scotland) Jayson Shaw	8
6	(Canada) Alex Pagulayan	7
(Kuwait) Omar Al-Shaheen	3
2	(Chinese Taipei) Chang Jung-Lin	8

Semifinals
8	(Spain) David Alcaide	8
5	(Austria) Albin Ouschan	6
3	(Scotland) Jayson Shaw	8
2	(Chinese Taipei) Chang Jung-Lin	3

Final
8	(Spain) David Alcaide	8
3	(Scotland) Jayson Shaw	7
