= 2018 Kremlin Cup (pool) =

Tournament information
- Dates: 11–15 September 2019
- City: Moscow
- Country: Russia
- Format: Ten-ball
- Total prize fund: RR 3,200,000

Final
- Champion: Niels Feijen
- Runner-up: Alexander Kazakis
- Score: 8–7

The 2018 Kremlin Cup was an international professional ten-ball pool tournament held between 17 and 21 September in Moscow, Russia.

Niels Feijen defeated Alexander Kazakis in the final 8–7.
