= Daniel Macioł =

Polish pool player

Personal information
- Nickname: Danielo
- Born: 13 October 1999 (age 26) Mikołów, Poland

Pool career
- Country: Poland
- Best finish: Runner-up (2026 WPA World Mixed Teams Ten-ball Championship)

Daniel Macioł (born 13 October 1999) is a Polish professional pool player. Macioł won the under 17s event at the WPA World Junior Nine-ball Championship in 2015, and finished as runner-up in the under 19s event in 2016. He was a part of the Polish team that finished as runner-up at the 2026 WPA World Mixed Teams Ten-ball Championship. He also won the bronze medal at the Men's Doubles 10-Ball World Championship in 2025. In 2024 he won the largest ever prize in a Ten-ball tournament of $100,000 in winning the Qatar World Cup 10 Ball Championship. He was awarded European Pocket Billiard Federation Youth Player of the Year in 2015. He has won 24 Polish national titles.

He began playing in 2006 at the Mikołów Billiard School, which was run by his father. By 2010, he was playing in tournaments, winning the Under-17 Polish championship aged 10. Maciol won the 2024 Estonian Open on the Euro Tour.

== Career titles and achievements ==
- 2026 European Pool Championships 9-Ball
- 2026 European Pool Championships 10-Ball
- 2024 Qatar World Cup 10-Ball
- 2024 Euro Tour Estonian Open
