= World Pool Masters =

Annual nine-ball tournament

The World Pool Masters is an annual international nine-ball tournament. Formerly, it was called the European Pool Masters (until 1995) until players from other parts of the globe were invited.

== History ==
Throughout much of its history, the tournament has featured sixteen world-class pool players, competing in single-elimination format. In 2010, the number of players was doubled to 32. The first round of the event was played in double elimination with the second round in single-elimination.

In 2011, the tournament reverted to the original 16-player single-elimination format, with each match a race-to-8, winner breaks. The 2011 edition was held in SM North EDSA Mall in Quezon City, Metro Manila, Philippines. Ralf Souquet of Germany won the said tournament for the record-setting sixth time, beating defending champion Dennis Orcollo of the Philippines, 8–5.

For the 2019 World Pool Masters, the field was changed to accommodate 24 players, with seeded players being given a bye through the first round. The 2022 World Pool Masters went back to its original format, inviting 16 players, with 8 seeded players meeting the other 8 in the first round of the single-elimination tournament.

== Winners ==
Date	Location	Winner	Runner-up	Final score
1993	Plymouth, England	(Austria) Werner Duregger	(Germany) Ralf Souquet	2–1 (sets)
1994	Doncaster, England	(Germany) Ralf Souquet	(England) Jimmy White	2–1 (sets)
1995	Blackpool, England	(England) Daryl Peach	(England) Lee Kendall	2–0 (sets)
1996	Blackpool, England	(Germany) Ralf Souquet (2)	(France) Vincent Facquet	2–1 (sets)
1997	Thurrock, England	(United States) Earl Strickland	(Republic of Ireland) Tommy Donlon	2–1 (sets)
1998	Thurrock, England	(Philippines) Francisco Bustamante	(Germany) Ralf Souquet	11–9
1999	Thurrock, England	(Netherlands) Alex Lely	(Philippines) Efren Reyes	7–5
2000	Thurrock, England	(Germany) Ralf Souquet (3)	(Netherlands) Alex Lely	7–3
2001	Thurrock, England	(Philippines) Francisco Bustamante (2)	(United States) Earl Strickland	7–6
2002	Milton Keynes, England	(Germany) Ralf Souquet (4)	(Philippines) Efren Reyes	9–4
2003	Egmond, Netherlands	(Malta) Tony Drago	(Chinese Taipei) Hsia Hui-kai	8–6
2004	Egmond, Netherlands	(Germany) Thomas Engert	(Germany) Oliver Ortmann	8–6
2005	Doncaster, England	(England) Raj Hundal	(United States) Rodney Morris	8–7
2006	Egmond, Netherlands	(Germany) Ralf Souquet (5)	(Philippines) Alex Pagulayan	8–4
2007	Egmond, Netherlands	(Germany) Thomas Engert (2)	(Spain) David Alcaide	8–5
2008	Las Vegas, United States	(Philippines) Alex Pagulayan	(Finland) Mika Immonen	8–6
2009	Las Vegas, United States	(England) Darren Appleton	(Netherlands) Nick van den Berg	8–4
2010	Las Vegas, United States	(Philippines) Dennis Orcollo	(Japan) Toru Kuribayashi	8–3
2011	Quezon City, Philippines	(Germany) Ralf Souquet (6)	(Philippines) Dennis Orcollo	8–5
2012	Kielce, Poland	(Poland) Karol Skowerski	(Poland) Mateusz Śniegocki	8–6
2013	Barnsley, England	(Netherlands) Niels Feijen	(England) Darren Appleton	8–6
2014	Nottingham, England	(United States) Shane Van Boening	(Greece) Nikos Ekonomopoulos	8–2
2015	Manchester, England	(United States) Shane Van Boening (2)	(England) Darren Appleton	8–2
2017	Victoria Stadium, Gibraltar	(Spain) David Alcaide	(Scotland) Jayson Shaw	8–7
2018	Victoria Stadium, Gibraltar	(Netherlands) Niels Feijen (2)	(United States) Shane Van Boening	8–4
2019	Victoria Stadium, Gibraltar	(Spain) David Alcaide (2)	(Greece) Alexander Kazakis	9–8
2020	Not held due to the COVID-19 pandemic			
2021	Europa Sports Park, Gibraltar	(Greece) Alexander Kazakis	(United States) Shane Van Boening	9–0
2022	Europa Sports Park, Gibraltar	(Germany) Joshua Filler	(Hong Kong) Lo Ho Sum	9–6
2023	Brentwood, England	(Chinese Taipei) Ko Pin-yi	(Albania) Eklent Kaçi	13–5
2024	Hildesheim, Germany	(United States) Fedor Gorst	(Germany) Joshua Filler	13–12

=== Records ===
- Ralf Souquet holds the record for winning the World Pool Masters the most times: six. (1994, 1996, 2000, 2002, 2006, 2011).
- Shane Van Boening holds the record for the most consecutive wins: two. (2014, 2015).
- The oldest pool player to ever win the tournament to date is Ralf Souquet of Germany, at 42 years old at the time of his victory. The youngest is Daryl Peach of United Kingdom, aged 23 years old at the time of his victory.

== Top Performers ==
Name	Nationality	Winner	Runner-up	Finals	Semi-final or better
Ralf Souquet	Germany	6	2	8	8
**Shane Van Boening**	United States	2	2	4	5
**David Alcaide**	Spain	2	1	3	3
Francisco Bustamante	Philippines	2	0	2	3
**Niels Feijen**	Netherlands	2	0	2	4
Thomas Engert	Germany	2	0	2	3
Darren Appleton	England	1	2	3	4
Alex Pagulayan	Canada	1	1	2	5
Earl Strickland	United States	1	1	2	4
Alex Lely	Netherlands	1	1	2	3
Dennis Orcollo	Philippines	1	1	2	3
**Alexander Kazakis**	Greece	1	1	2	2
**Ko Pin-yi**	Chinese Taipei	1	1	1	3
**Fedor Gorst**	United States	1	1	1	1
Joshua Filler	Germany	1	1	2	2

- Active participants are shown in **bold**.
- In the event of identical records, players are sorted in alphabetical order by first name.
