= Kremlin Cup (pool) =

The Kremlin Cup (Russian: Кубок Кремля, romanized: Kubok Kremlja) is an annual pool tournament held in the Olympic Stadium in Moscow, Russia which has been held since 2011. Ruslan Chinakhov has won the most times, winning the event in both 2014 and 2015. The tournament takes place in parallel to a Russian pyramid event of the same name also held in Moscow. The event was a nine-ball tournament in the inaugural 2011 edition, but changed to ten-ball in 2012.

== Winners ==
Year	Winner	Score	Finalist	Semi-finalists	Discipline
2011	(Albania) Nick Malai	11–8	(Finland) Mika Immonen	(Greece) Alexander Kazakis	Nine-ball
2011	(Albania) Nick Malai	11–8	(Finland) Mika Immonen	(Russia) Ruslan Chinakhov	Nine-ball
2012	(Poland) Mateusz Śniegocki	8–6	(Estonia) Denis Grabe	(Greece) Nikos Ekonomopoulos	Ten-ball
2012	(Poland) Mateusz Śniegocki	8–6	(Estonia) Denis Grabe	(Greece) Alexander Kazakis	Ten-ball
2013	(Germany) Thorsten Hohmann	9–7	(Russia) Konstantin Stepanov	(Estonia) Denis Grabe	Ten-ball
2013	(Germany) Thorsten Hohmann	9–7	(Russia) Konstantin Stepanov	(Albania) Nick Malai	Ten-ball
2014	(Russia) Ruslan Chinakhov	8–7	(Russia) Evgeny Stalev	(Russia) Fedor Gorst	Ten-ball
2014	(Russia) Ruslan Chinakhov	8–7	(Russia) Evgeny Stalev	(Netherlands) Niels Feijen	Ten-ball
2015	(Russia) Ruslan Chinakhov	9–8	(Finland) Mika Immonen	(Bosnia and Herzegovina) Sanjin Pehlivanović	Ten-ball
2015	(Russia) Ruslan Chinakhov	9–8	(Finland) Mika Immonen	(Germany) Thorsten Hohmann	Ten-ball
2016	(Greece) Alexander Kazakis	9–6	(Germany) Thorsten Hohmann	(Belarus) Dsmitryj Tschuprou	Ten-ball
2016	(Greece) Alexander Kazakis	9–6	(Germany) Thorsten Hohmann	(Germany) Ralf Souquet	Ten-ball
2017	(Spain) David Alcaide	9–6	(Greece) Alexander Kazakis	(Netherlands) Nick van den Berg	Ten-ball
2017	(Spain) David Alcaide	9–6	(Greece) Alexander Kazakis	(Albania) Eklent Kaçi	Ten-ball
2018	(Netherlands) Niels Feijen	8–7	(Greece) Alexander Kazakis	(Austria) Albin Ouschan	Ten-ball
2018	(Netherlands) Niels Feijen	8–7	(Greece) Alexander Kazakis	(Russia) Fedor Gorst	Ten-ball
2019	(United States) Tyler Styer	8–7	(Spain) David Alcaide	(United States) Shane Van Boening	Ten-ball
2019	(United States) Tyler Styer	8–7	(Spain) David Alcaide	(Serbia) Aleksa Pecelj	Ten-ball
2021	(Armenia) Babken Melkonyan	9–7	(Russia) Konstantin Zolotilov	(Greece) Dimitris Loukatos	Ten-ball
2021	(Armenia) Babken Melkonyan	9–7	(Russia) Konstantin Zolotilov	(Russia) Konstantin Stepanov	Ten-ball

== Top Performers ==
Name	Nationality	Winner	Runner-up	Semi-final or better
Ruslan Chinakhov	Russia	2	0	3
Alexander Kazakis	Greece	1	2	5
Thorsten Hohmann	Germany	1	1	3
Nick Malai	Albania	1	0	2
Niels Feijen	Netherlands	1	0	2
