= 2017 Klagenfurt Open =

Dynamic Billiard Klagenfurt Open
Tournament information
- Dates: 5–7 October 2017
- Venue: Sportpark Klagenfurt,
- City: Klagenfurt
- Country: Austria
- Organisation: Euro Tour
- Format: Single Elimination
- Total prize fund: €36,000
- Winner's share: €4,500

Final
- Champion: (Germany) Ralf Souquet
- Runner-up: (Germany) Sebastian Ludwig
- Score: 9-6

The 2017 Dynamic Klagenfurt Open, was the fourth Euro Tour 9-Ball pool event in 2017. The event was won by Germany's Ralf Souquet who defeated another German Sebastian Ludwig 9–7 in the final.

== Tournament format ==
The event saw a total of 142 players compete, in a double-elimination knockout tournament, until the last 32 stage; where the tournament was contested as single elimination.

=== Prize fund ===
	Prize money
Winner	4.500 €
Finalist	€3.000
Semifinalist	€1.750
quarterfinalist	€1.250
last 16	€1.000
Last 32	€500
33–48 Place	€250
Total	€36.000

== Tournament results ==
1st Round
(Sweden) Christian Sparrenlöv	4
(Austria) Maximilian Lechner	9
(Sweden) Daniel Tångudd	5
(Russia) Konstantin Stepanov	9
(Poland) Marek Kudlik	7
(Poland) Karol Skowerski	9
(Czech Republic) Marek Hajdovsky	8
(Germany) Ralf Souquet	9
(Netherlands) Nick van den Berg	8
(Poland) Mateusz Śniegocki	9
(Austria) Mario He	9
(Poland) Wojciech Szewczyk	8
(Poland) Konrad Juszczyszyn	8
(Bosnia and Herzegovina) Sanjin Pehlivanović	9
(Spain) José Alberto Delgado	8
(Syria) Mohammad Soufi	9
(Germany) Joshua Filler	5
(Poland) Wiktor Zieliński	9
(Russia) Fedor Gorst	9
(Portugal) Joao Grilo	4
(Finland) Petri Makkonen	4
(Germany) Sebastian Ludwig	9
(Slovakia) Jakub Koniar	6
(Albania) Eklent Kaçi	9
(Austria) Albin Ouschan	9
(Spain) Francisco Sánchez	5
(Poland) Mieszko Fortuński	9
(Poland) Radosław Babica	5
(Estonia) Denis Grabe	9
(United Kingdom) Mark Gray	8
(Netherlands) Ivo Aarts	3
(Poland) Tomasz Kapłan	9

2nd Round
(Austria) Maximilian Lechner	9
(Russia) Konstantin Stepanov	8
(Poland) Karol Skowerski	6
(Germany) Ralf Souquet	9
(Poland) Mateusz Śniegocki	9
(Austria) Mario He	7
(Bosnia and Herzegovina) Sanjin Pehlivanović	9
(Syria) Mohammad Soufi	8
(Poland) Wiktor Zieliński	4
(Russia) Fedor Gorst	9
(Germany) Sebastian Ludwig	9
(Albania) Eklent Kaçi	8
(Austria) Albin Ouschan	9
(Poland) Mieszko Fortuński	2
(Estonia) Denis Grabe	9
(Poland) Tomasz Kapłan	3

Quarterfinals
(Austria) Maximilian Lechner	3
(Germany) Ralf Souquet	9
(Poland) Mateusz Śniegocki	9
(Bosnia and Herzegovina) Sanjin Pehlivanović	8
(Russia) Fedor Gorst	6
(Germany) Sebastian Ludwig	9
(Austria) Albin Ouschan	6
(Estonia) Denis Grabe	9

Semifinals
(Germany) Ralf Souquet	9
(Poland) Mateusz Śniegocki	6
(Germany) Sebastian Ludwig	9
(Estonia) Denis Grabe	7

Finals
(Germany) Ralf Souquet	9
(Germany) Sebastian Ludwig	6
