= 2025 WPA Women's World Nine-ball Championship =

Tournament information
- Dates: 18–21 December 2025
- Venue: Hyatt Regency Jacksonville Riverfront
- City: Jacksonville, Florida
- Country: United States
- Organisation: World Pool-Billiard Association
- Format: Double elimination / single elimination
- Discipline: Nine-ball
- Total prize fund: $175,000
- Winner's share: $50,000

Final
- Champion: Seo Seoa (KOR)
- Runner-up: Kristina Tkach (RUS)
- Score: 3–2 (sets)

The 2025 WPA Women's World Nine-ball Championship was a professional nine-ball pool championship that took place from 18 to 21 December 2025. It was the 32nd edition of the WPA Women's World Nine-ball Championship and was held at the Hyatt Regency Jacksonville Riverfront in Jacksonville, Florida. The event featured a total prize fund of $175,000 and utilized a sets-based format, with a preliminary double-elimination stage followed by a single-elimination tournament bracket for the final 16 players. With Seo Seoa and Kristina Tkach tied 2–2 in sets, Seo won the final set on a shootour to win her first world championship.

== Prize money ==
The entry fee for the event was $500, with a total prize fund of $175,000, the winner receiving $50,000. A breakdown of the prize money is shown below:

Position	Prize money
Winner	$50,000
Runner-up	$25,000
Semi-finalist	$16,000
Quarter-finalist	$9,000
Last 16	$4,000
Total	$175,000

== Knockout stage ==
The following is the results from the knockout stage of the event. Matches were played as a best-of-five sets format. Players in bold denote match winners.

Round of 16
**Liu Shasha (CHN)**	**3**
Rubilen Amit (PHI)	0
Kelly Fisher (GBR)	2
**Allison Fisher (GBR)**	**3**
**Seo Seoa (KOR)**	**3**
Eylül Kibaroğlu (TUR)	0
**Wang Wan-ling (TPE)**	**3**
Margarita Fefilova (BLR)	0
Wei Tzu-chien (TPE)	2
**Jasmin Ouschan (AUT)**	**3**
Chihiro Kawahara (JPN)	2
**Fu Xiaofang (CHN)**	**3**
Chou Chieh-yu (TPE)	0
**Kristina Tkach (RUS)**	**3**
Hung Meng-hsia (AUS)	1
**Chezka Centeno (PHI)**	**3**

Quarter-finals
Liu Shasha (CHN)	1
**Allison Fisher (GBR)**	**3**
**Seo Seoa (KOR)**	**3**
Wang Wan-ling (TPE)	0
Jasmin Ouschan (AUT)	0
**Fu Xiaofang (CHN)**	**3**
**Kristina Tkach (RUS)**	**3**
Chezka Centeno (PHI)	1

Semi-finals
**Seo Seoa (KOR)**	**3**
Allison Fisher (GBR)	0
**Kristina Tkach (RUS)**	**3**
Fu Xiaofang (CHN)	0

Final
**Seo Seoa (KOR)**	**3**
Kristina Tkach (RUS)	2
