= Han Yu (pool player) =

Chinese pool player (born 1992)

Personal information
- Born: 10 July 1992 (age 33)

Pool career
- Country: China
- Pool games: Nine-ball

Tournament wins
- World Champion: Nine-ball (2013, 2016, 2018); Heyball (2018)
- Current rank: 20
- Highest rank: 1

Han Yu (Chinese: 韩雨; pinyin: Hán Yǔ; born 10 July 1992 in Tangshan, China) is a Chinese professional pool player. She is a four-time world pool champion, having won the WPA Women's World Nine-ball Championship in 2013, 2016 and 2018, and the WPA Women's World Heyball Championship in 2018. Han has also reached the final of the WPA World Ten-ball Championship in 2023, and the semi-finals of three further Women's World Championships: the nine-ball event in 2017, and the ten-ball events in 2011 and 2014.

Han won the nine-ball event at the women's division of the All Japan Championship in 2009 and in 2019. She has also won the women's division of the China Open 9-Ball Championship on four occasions: 2014, 2016, 2023, and 2024. Han received Billiard Digests' "Player of the Year" award in 2016, and AZBilliards' "Player of the Year" award in 2016 and 2018. Han peaked at number one in the WPA Women's world rankings first in 2014.

== Career ==
Han Yu was born 10 July 1992 in Tangshan, China. She began playing pool at the age of six after following her father Han Yongqua to a pool hall. She would step on tip-toe to play shots, her father saw passion for the game and took her to Beijing and Singapore for professional training. Yongqua and his wife had a disagreement over letting their daughter play pool professionally. He took Han to Shanxi, Inner Mongolia and Northern China to get opinions on her play, including from Liu Haitao. With positive reviews, Yongqua chose to support her playing professionally. Han Yu credits the majority of her ability to play professionally to her father, who gave up his job as a football coach to support her. Under Liu, Han transitioned from playing Chinese eight-ball to playing nine-ball, changing her cue stick, and getting advice from national champion Zhang Kai. She first appeared at a major pool event in 2007, when she won the China National Women's 9-Ball Championship at the age of 15. She defeated veteran Chinese player Chen Xue 11‍–‍6 in the final.

The following year, aged 16, she joined the Chinese national billiards team. In 2008, she lost in the semi-finals of the women's division of the All Japan Championship, but went on to win the event in 2009. Behind 2‍–‍5 in the final, Han was unsure of what length the final was set to be, upon learning that it was a first to nine match, she took a comfort break and proceeded to win the match 9‍–‍6. In 2011, Han reached the semi-finals of the WPA Women's World Ten-ball Championship, losing 9–4 to the eventual champion Kelly Fisher. Later in the year, she lost to Bi Zhu Qing in the semi-finals of the women's division of the All Japan Championship.

In 2013, Han became a world champion for the first time by winning the WPA Women's World Nine-ball Championship. She defeated Fisher and Tan Ho-yun en route to the final, where she won against Lin Yuan-chun 9–1. After winning the championship, Han began packing up her cue without celebrating. She was then surrounded by fans requesting autographs and photographs, and broke into tears when her mother arrived. The final for her win was watched by over 100 million people. In 2014, Han reached the semi-finals of the WPA Women's World Ten-ball Championship but lost to Fisher again. In the same year, she won the China Open 9-Ball Championship's women title for the first time, defeating Kim Ga-young in the final 9‍–‍5. Han represented 'China 1' at the 2014 World Team Championship, where the team reached the semi-finals.

In 2016, Han reached the semi-finals of the Amway Cup, where she was defeated 8–9 by the eventual champion Chezka Centeno. Two months later, in the final of the China Open 9-Ball Championship she trailed world number one Liu Shasha 5‍–‍8 but won four racks in a row to win the event 9‍–‍8. In December 2016, Han won her second nine-ball Women's World Championship, defeating Chihiro Kawahara 9–7 in the final. Her third nine-ball Women's World Championship title came in 2018 with a victory over Wang Xiaotong in the final. Han played in the 2018 WPA Women's World Heyball Championship, reaching the final. She led Liu Shasha 13‍–‍5 in a race-to-17 racks match, but lost nine of the next eleven to only lead by one, but eventually won 17‍–‍14.

Han was seeded eighth at the 2019 World Pool Masters and bypassed the preliminary round, but lost 6–7 to Shane Van Boening in the first round. She won the 2019 All Japan Championship's women title with a 9–7 win in the final over Chen Siming, and reached the quarter-finals of the 2019 WPA Women's World Nine-ball championship, losing 5–9 to Zhou Doudou.

During the COVID-19 pandemic, unable to travel for pool tournaments, Han volunteered at a nucleic acid testing site in her hometown of Tangshan. Following a couple years away, Han reached the final of the 2023 Women's World Tenball Championship, where she lost 5‍–‍9 to Chezka Centeno. The victor was set to be awarded the largest winners prize in women's pool.

Han went on to win the China Women's 9-Ball Championship twice more in consecutive years, defeating Liu Shasha 9–7 in 2023 and Wang Xiaotong 9–8 in 2024. She partnered with Wu Kun-lin at the 2024 Kamui Mixed Doubles event, where they won the best-of-three final 4–3 and 4–0. At the 2025 World Games, Han won the women's division of the ten-ball event, defeating Centeno in the final.

=== Awards ===
Han was awarded the "Player of the Year" award in 2016 by Billiards Digest and AZBilliards for winning the China Open and World Nine-ball Championships in the same year. Two years later, she won AZBilliards' "Player of the Year" award again, beating out Chen Siming and Fu Xiaofang, after her second victory over the world nine-ball title and her performance in the Amway Cup. Han reached number one on the WPA Women's world ranking in 2014, following her first world championship win in 2013.

== Titles & achievements ==
All competitions listed are first-place wins in women's divisions.

- 2009 All Japan Championship
- 2013 WPA Women's World Nine-ball Championship
- 2014 China Open 9-Ball Championship
- 2016 WPA Women's World Nine-ball Championship
- 2016 China Open 9-Ball Championship
- 2016 Billiards Digest "Player of the Year"
- 2016 AZBilliards "Player of the Year"
- 2018 WPA Women's World Nine-ball Championship
- 2018 WPA Women's World Heyball Championship
- 2018 AZBilliards "Player of the Year"
- 2019 All Japan Championship
- 2023 China Open 9-Ball Championship
- 2024 China Open 9-ball Championship
- 2025 World Games Ten-ball Singles
- 2026 Predator Mixed Doubles Open - with (Wu Kun Lin)

== Personal life ==
Han married Lee Ming in September 2018. The wedding was hosted by China Central Television billiards commentator Jiang Yi. They have a daughter who was born in 2020.
