= 2017 Kremlin Cup (pool) =

Russian 10-ball pool tournament, held September 2017

Tournament information
- Dates: 18–23 September 2017
- Venue: Olympic Stadium
- City: Moscow
- Country: Russia
- Format: 10-ball

Final
- Champion: David Alcaide
- Runner-up: Alexander Kazakis
- Score: 9-6

The 2017 Kremlin Cup was a professional ten-ball pool tournament held from 18 to 23 September 2017 in Olympic Stadium in Moscow, Russia.

The winner was David Alcaide, who defeated the defending champion in the final Alexander Kazakis 9–6. Nick van den Berg and Eklent Kaçi were defeated semi-finalists.

== Tournament format ==
The event featured 101 participants competing first in a Double-elimination tournament. When there are 32 players remaining, the tournament progressed to a single-elimination tournament. The event was contested as race to eight racks, with the final as a race to 9 racks. The event was played as winner breaks.

== Prize money ==
	Winnings
Winner	640.000 RUB
Runner-up	450.000 RUB
Semi-finalist	251.000 RUB
Quarter-finalist	140.000 RUB
Last 16	65.000 RUB
Last 32	33.000 RUB
Total	3.200.000 RUB

== Results ==
Below is the single elimination round from the last 32 stage onwards.

Last 32
1	(Greece) Alexander Kazakis	8
32	(United States) Óscar Domínguez	5
17	(South Africa) Jason Theron	5
16	(United States) Corey Deuel	8
9	(Poland) Mieszko Fortuński	7
24	(Russia) Iljas Chairullin	8
25	(Vietnam) Nguyen Phuc Long	1
8	(Estonia) Denis Grabe	8
5	(Poland) Radosław Babica	8
28	(Iran) Armin Mahmoudi	2
21	(Finland) Mika Immonen	5
12	(Russia) Konstantin Stepanov	8
13	(United States) Dennis Hatch	1
20	(Albania) Eklent Kaçi	8
29	(Russia) Ruslan Tschinachow	7
4	(Finland) Petri Makkonen	8
3	(Netherlands) Nick van den Berg	8
30	(Vietnam) Le Guang Trung	3
19	(Greece) Nikos Ekonomopoulos	5
14	(Poland) Konrad Juszczyszyn	8
11	(Iran) Takhti Zarekani	7
22	(Vietnam) Lương Chí Dũng	8
27	(United States) Shane Van Boening	5
6	(Poland) Wojciech Szewczyk	8
7	(Austria) Mario He	5
26	(Germany) Ralf Souquet	8
23	(Poland) Mateusz Śniegocki	3
10	(Spain) David Alcaide	8
15	(Denmark) Daniel Kandi	5
18	(Austria) Albin Ouschan	8
31	(Germany) Joshua Filler	4
2	(Poland) Wojciech Sroczyński	8

Last 16
(Greece) Alexander Kazakis	8
(United States) Corey Deuel	5
(Russia) Iljas Chairullin	3
(Estonia) Denis Grabe	8
(Poland) Radosław Babica	8
(Russia) Konstantin Stepanov	6
(Albania) Eklent Kaçi	8
(Finland) Petri Makkonen	7
(Netherlands) Nick van den Berg	8
(Poland) Konrad Juszczyszyn	5
(Vietnam) Lương Chí Dũng	8
(Poland) Wojciech Szewczyk	2
(Germany) Ralf Souquet	3
(Spain) David Alcaide	8
(Austria) Albin Ouschan	4
(Poland) Wojciech Sroczyński	8

Quarter-final
(Greece) Alexander Kazakis	8
(Estonia) Denis Grabe	2
(Poland) Radosław Babica	4
(Albania) Eklent Kaçi	8
(Netherlands) Nick van den Berg	8
(Vietnam) Lương Chí Dũng	4
(Spain) David Alcaide	8
(Poland) Wojciech Sroczyński	3

Semi-final
(Greece) Alexander Kazakis	8
(Albania) Eklent Kaçi	3
(Netherlands) Nick van den Berg	4
(Spain) David Alcaide	8

Final
(Greece) Alexander Kazakis	6
(Spain) David Alcaide	9
