= Jörn Kaplan =

German pool player, born 1981

Personal information
- Born: 15 May 1981 (age 45)

Pool career
- Country: Germany

Jörn Kaplan (born 15 April 1981) is a German pool player.

== Career ==
At the 2005 German Open, Kaplin won his first Euro Tour medal, where he reached the semi-finals. In 2006 he won his first German championship in 8-Ball. In 2008, Kaplin, along with partners Benjamin Baier and Marco Tschudi won the German team championships with 22 wins, and 6 losses.

== Personal life ==
Jörn Kaplan married Ina Kaplan in 2012, with one child.
