= Babken Melkonyan =

Armenian snooker and pool player

Babken Melkonyan (Armenian: Բաբկեն Մելքոնյան; born 4 March 1980, Yerevan, Armenia) is an Armenian amateur snooker & pool player, who participated in the EBSA European Snooker Championships 2010 and the WPA World Nine-ball Championship 2014.

== Career ==
=== In Pool ===
==== 2013 ====
External videos
- Babken Melkonyan vs Ovidiu Cristea: Full Match

In April, he reached the final of the Romanian National Championship of ten ball, but lost 3–7 to Ovidiu Cristea. At the Dynamic Italy Open 2013 he finished 33rd place, defeated to Tobias Bongers.

==== 2015 ====
In February 2015 Melkonyan was knocked out in the first round of the 10-Ball Championship.

== Titles ==
- 2021 Kremlin Cup
- 2022 Black Sea Cup

=== In Snooker ===
He won the National Championship of Romania in 2010. In the same year, Melkonyan participated in the EBSA European Snooker Championships, where he left the tournament at the group stage. Group A table:

#	Player name	MP	MW	FW	FL	FD
1	(Republic of Ireland) John Torpey	7	7	28	7	+21
2	(England) Kuldesh Johal	7	6	26	5	+21
3	(Israel) David Vaitzman	7	5	21	16	+5
4	(Finland) Tero Suvanto	7	4	21	16	+5
5	(Austria) Paul Schopf	7	3	18	21	-3
6	(Armenia) Babken Melkonyan	7	2	13	23	-10
7	(Romania) Zah Gelu	7	1	8	24	-16
8	(Romania) Cristian Chircu	7	0	5	28	-23
