= Wang Wan-ling =

Taiwanese pool player

Personal information
- Nationality: Taiwanese
- Born: March 19, 1997 (age 28) Taiwan
- Occupation: Professional pool player

Wang Wan-ling (born March 19, 1997) is a Taiwanese professional pool player. She secured her first major title at the 2016 Hokuriku Open. In September 2024, she won the Japan Open Ladies event. She reached the quarter-finals of both the 2025 WPA Women's World Nine-ball Championship and 2025 WPA Women's World Ten-ball Championship.

== Titles and achievements ==
- 2024 Japan Open Ladies – Champion
- 2016 Hokuriku Open Ladies – Champion
