= Raj Hundal =

English-born Indian pool player

Personal information
- Nickname: "The Hitman"
- Born: 30 September 1981 (age 45) London, England, United Kingdom

Pool career
- Country: India
- Pool games: 9-Ball

Raj Hundal (born 30 September 1981 in London) is an English-born Indian professional pool player. Hundal is most famous for winning the 2005 World Pool Masters, where he defeated Rodney Morris in the final 9–8. Hundal also represented Europe at the 2005 Mosconi Cup,

== Achievements ==
- 2008 Quezon City Invasion
- 2005 World Pool Masters
