= Chen Chia-hua =

Taiwanese pool player

Personal information
- Nickname: Amber
- Nationality: Taiwanese
- Born: March 27, 2000 (age 26) Taiwan

Pool career
- Turned pro: 2017

Chen Chia-hua (born 27 March 2000), popularly known as Amber Chen, is a Taiwanese professional pool player. She is a former world junior champion and a winner on the Women's Professional Billiard Association (WPBA) tour. She won the 2016 WPA World Nine-ball Junior Championship defeating Tsai Pei-chun in the final. Two years later, she won the 2018 WPA World Nine-ball Junior Championship, defeating Seo Seoa in the final. Chen won the 2022 Canada Open, defeating Allison Fisher in a shootout to claim the title. She reached the semi-finals of the 2025 WPA Women's World Eight-ball Championship, before being defeated by Jasmin Ouschan.

== Titles ==
- 2022 WPBA Predator Canada Open
- 2019 Japan Open Ladies
- WPA World Nine-ball Junior Championship (2016, 2018)
