= Kristina Tkach =

Russian pool player, born 1999

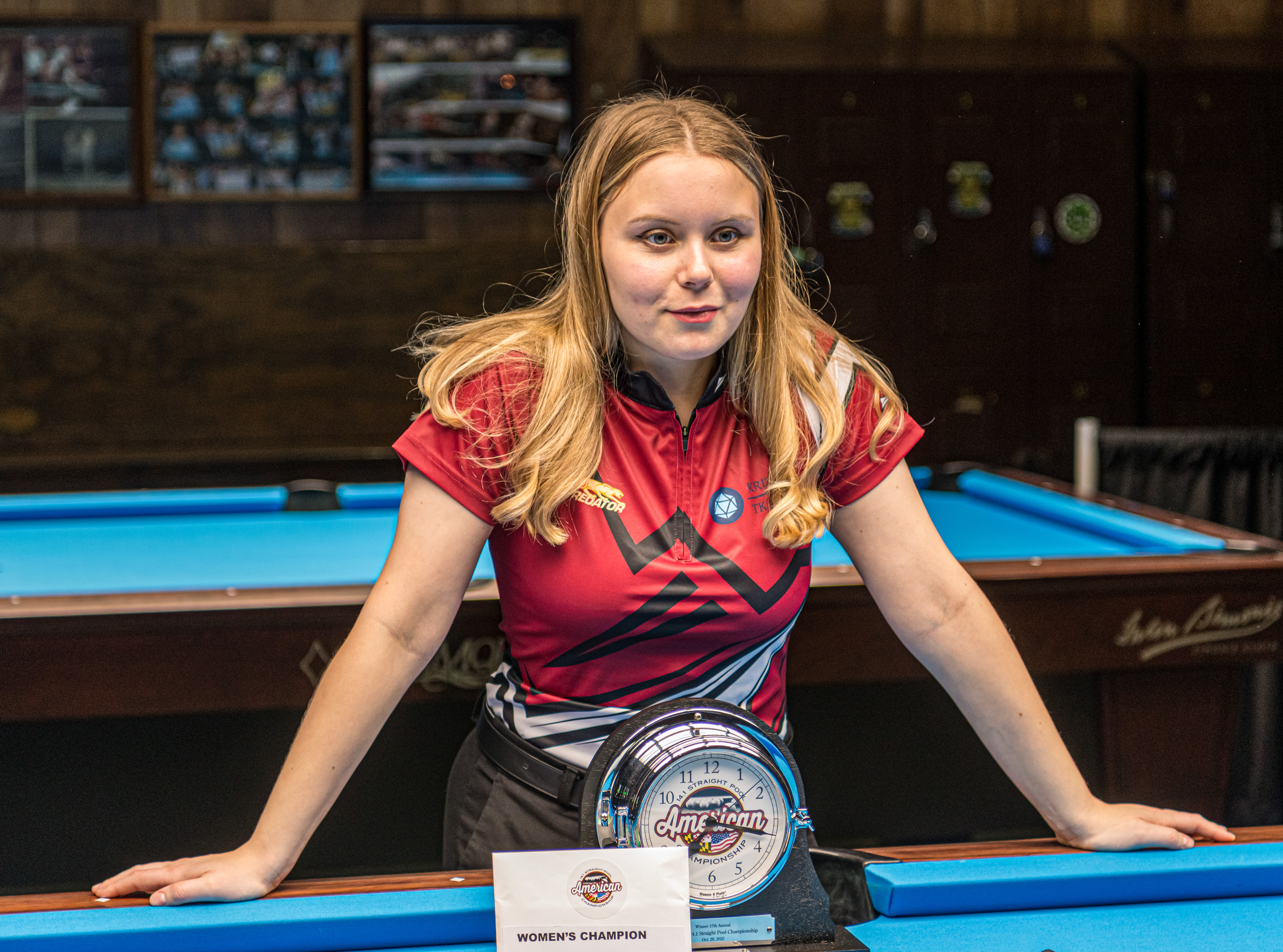

Personal information
- Nickname: "The Krystal"
- Born: 19 January 1999 (age 27) Moscow, Russia

Pool career
- Country: Russia and Individual Neutral Athletes
- Sport: Nine-ball
- Turned pro: 2014

Kristina Olegovna Tkach (Russian: Кристина Олеговна Ткач, romanized: Kristina Tkach; born 19 January 1999) is a Russian professional pool player. Tkach won the 2024 WPA Women's World Ten-ball Championship defeating Seo Seoa in the final. Following the win, she won Billiard Digest's "player of the year" award, and reached Women's Professional Billiard Association world number one. The following year, at the 2025 WPA Women's World Nine-ball Championship she lost in the final to Seo. As a junior, Tkach won the 2017 WPA World Nine-ball Junior Championship, defeating Lee Woo-jin in the final 9–6.

Tkach is a four time European champion having won the eight-ball event in 2016 and 2019, as well as straight pool in 2017 and 2019. In addition, she is a nine-time Junior European Champion. Tkach is a regular player on the Euro Tour events, reaching the Tour number one in 2016. She is the second most successful player of all time on the tour behind Jasmin Ouschan, having won eight events beginning with the 2016 North Cyprus Open. She is recognized as a WPBA Elite Pro.

== Career ==
Kristina Tkach was born 19 January 1999 in Moscow, Russia. Tkach began playing in 2008, being supported by her parents to take up the game.

=== Early career (2008–2014) ===
Before turning 10 years of age, Tkach finished third at the Russian Under 18 Championship 2008 in eight-ball. Tkach then moved in 2009 to play straight pool competing in the Moscow Under 18 City Championship final, finishing as runner-up and also reaching the semi-finals in the women's competition nine-ball. The following year she won the junior women in nine-ball and ten-ball her first two out of a total of twenty titles at Moscow Under 18 Championships. Tkach also competed in the ladies event at the championship where she lost in the final 18–50 against Anna Mashirina.

In 2012 Tkach played in her first European Youth Championships, at which she was the youngest medal winner at 13 years and 7 months. She had reached the semi-finals in the eight-ball event losing to Kamila Khodjaeva. In November 2012, she reached her first adult Russian championship semi-final, in both the straight pool and eight-ball events. In the European youth Championship 2013 she reached the semi-finals in both the ten-ball and nine-ball disciplines. In October 2013, she won three of the four titles at the Moscow City Championship in the women's events. A month later she reached her first adult Russian championship finals, but lost to Anna Maschirina (ten-ball) and Daria Sirotina (nine-ball). In addition, she finished in straight and in eight-ball in third place, reaching the semi-final or better in all five events.

=== Euro Tour number 1 (2014–2020) ===
In March 2014, she played in her first Women's European Championship. After she was eliminated in both the straight and ten-ball events in the preliminary round, she reached the quarter-finals in the eight-ball, in which she against defeated by the Kamila Khodjaeva 5–6. After the European Championships, Tkach played in her first Euro Tour event, won her first medal, by finishing second at the 2014 North Cyprus Open, being defeated by Jasmin Ouschan. In August, Tkach won the eight-ball Junior European Pool Championship with a 5–4 final victory against Kamila Khodjaeva.

At the beginning of 2015, Tkach became the Russian under-18 champion in all four disciplines for the first time. (Note: Tkach won the straight, nine-ball, eight-ball, ten-ball events.) In November 2015 she reached the WPA World Junior Championship quarter-final before losing to China's Jiang Teng. Despite being eliminated in the first round of the straight pool event and in the ten-ball in the quarter-finals, she reached the final of the eight-ball event of the 2015 European championships. She won the match 6–3 against Kateryna Polowyntschuk, to win her first European Championship. In June 2016, she won the 2016 North Cyprus Open, defeating Marharyta Fjafilawa 7–3, to win her first Euro Tour tournament. At the 2016 Junior European Championships she won three events, defeating Diana Khodjaeva 5–3 and 6–5, (ten-ball, nine-ball) and Dina Fatychowa 5–1, (eight-ball). A few days later, she won 7–4 in the final against Katarzyna Wesołowska to win the 2016 Albanian Open. The win made Tkach the number one-ranked player on the Euro Tour.

The following season Tkach won the 2016 Portugal Open against Ina Kaplan 7–4 winning her third Euro Tour event in a row. During the 2016 Kremlin World Cup, Tkach, along with Daria Sirotina was the only woman the round of the last 32 where she lost to Denis Grabe. She won her fifth Euro Tour medal at the 2017 Portugal Open losing 3–7 to Ouschan in the final. After finishing second in the one-year ranking of the Euro Tour after the Portugal Open, she qualified for the nine-ball Competition the World Games 2017. At the Games in Wrocław she lost in the quarter-finals against the subsequent gold medal winner Chen Siming. In the European Youth Championship 2017 she again won all three competitions for junior women. In the finals she defeated Daryna Sirantschuk (5–0, ten-ball), Weronika Karwik (5–0, eight-ball), Valery Trushevskaya (6–1, nine-ball). In November 2017, Tkach entered the 2017 WPA World Nine-ball Junior Championship where she reached the final before defeating Lee Woo-jin to become junior world champion. She was the fifth European and the second Russian, after Natalja Seroschtan (2013) to win the title.

In April 2019, she won the Women's Pro Players Championship and was presented with a trophy made of waterford crystal, valued at $500. The trophy shattered when a member of Tkach's entourage dropped the box it was in while transporting it out of the arena. Tkach won gold medals in both the eight-ball and straight pool disciplines at the 2019 European Pool Championships. She also won the 2019 Treviso Open, defeating Marharyta Fefilava in the final 7–5.

=== Return (2021–present) ===
Following the resumption of international play in 2021, Tkach moved her primary competitive base to the United States and began competing regularly on the Women's Professional Billiard Association (WPBA) tour. In 2022, she won the American Straight Pool Championship after defeating Karen Corr in the final.

Tkach won multiple Women's Professional Billiard Association (WPBA) events in 2024, including the Iron City Invitational and the Railyard Invitational, which contributed to her reaching the number one spot in the WPBA rankings. In November 2024, Tkach won the 2024 WPA Women's World Ten-ball Championship. She defeated Seo Seoa in the final with a score of 3–2 in sets to claim the championship. For her performances throughout the year, she was named the 2024 Female Player of the Year by Billiards Digest.

Seoa and Tkach also met in the final of the 2025 WPA Women's World Nine-ball Championship. With the scores tied at 2–2 in sets, Seoa won a playoff rack to win the title.

=== Team career ===
With the Russian national team Tkach won the European Championships in 2015 and 2017, with runner-up finishes in 2014 and 2016. Tkach was part of the European team that defeated the USA three times in a row in the first three editions of the Atlantic Challenge Cup (2015, 2016, 2017).

== Achievements ==
- European Pool Championships
  - Junior
    - eight-ball: 2014, 2016, 2017
    - ten-ball: 2015, 2016, 2017
    - nine-ball: 2015, 2016, 2017
  - Ladies
    - eight-ball: 2016,2019
    - straight pool: 2017,2019
- 2022 American Straight Pool Championship
- Russian National Championship
  - 14–1 Continuous: 2014, 2016, 2017
  - ten-ball: 2015, 2017
  - eight-ball: 2016, 2017
  - nine-ball: 2016, 2017
- Euro Tour
  - 2016 North Cyprus Open
  - 2016 Albanian Open
  - 2016 Portugal Open
  - 2018 Italian Open
  - 2018 Portugal Open
  - 2018 Treviso Open
  - 2019 Treviso Open
  - 2021 Lasko Open
- 2017 WPA World Nine-ball Junior Championship
- 2025 Women's World Ten-ball Championships

Team

- European Pool Championships: 2015, 2017
- Atlantic Challenge Cup: 2015, 2016, 2017
