= Sebastian Ludwig =

German professional pool player (born 1988)

Personal information
- Born: 22 March 1988 (age 38)

Pool career
- Country: Germany
- Pool games: 9-Ball

Sebastian Ludwig (born 22 March 1988) is a German professional pool player. Ludwig has been successful on the Euro Tour reaching two semi-finals, and also the final of the 2017 Klagenfurt Open where he lost 9–6 to Ralf Souquet.

Ludwig reached ranking 1 in the German Pool Tour in 2017.
