= Seo Seoa =

South Korean pool player (born 2002)

Personal information
- Native name: 서서아
- Nickname: Princess of Pool
- Nationality: South Korean
- Born: November 27, 2002 (age 23) Gwangju, South Korea
- Years active: 2020s–present

Pool career
- Events: Nine-ball, Ten-ball
- Turned pro: 2018

Tournament wins
- World Champion: Nine-ball (2025)

Seo Seoa (Note: The given name "Seoa" is also spelled SeoA and Seo-ah.) (Korean: 서서아, born November 27, 2002) is a South Korean professional pool player known for her performances in international nine‑ball and ten-ball competitions. Often referred to as the "Princess of Pool" she competes in both women's and mixed-gender tournaments.

Seo was born in Gwangju, South Korea. She won the 2025 WPA Women's World Nine-ball Championship. Seo is the second South Korean to win the WPA Women's World Nine-ball Championship since Kim Ga-young in 2004 and 2006. She is recognized as a WPBA Elite Pro.

== Career ==
Seo began playing pool in 2013 after her parents encouraged her to take up a sport. In 2017, she competed in the World Junior 9‑Ball Championship in Moscow. Fourteen at the time, she lost in the qualifying rounds to eventual champion—and future rival—Kristina Tkach, 18, before rallying to finish in the top eight. She returned in 2018 and advanced all the way to the final, finishing as runner‑up. After returning home, she left high school in Gwangju and moved to Seoul to train at the Pocket Academy run by Kim Ga-young. In June of the following year, at age 16, she won her first women's national championship.

Seo has competed on the international professional pool circuit, representing South Korea in major nine‑ball tournaments. In July 2025, she became one of the few women to advance to the last 64 of the prestigious World Pool Championship, after defeating two-time world champion Albin Ouschan 9–2 in the early rounds of the event in Jeddah, Saudi Arabia. She was the only female competitor in the field and stood one win away from becoming the first woman to reach the last 32 at the World Pool Championship. She has also competed in domestic events such as the Namwon National Pocket Billiards Championship, where she won the women's division.

Earlier in the 2025 season, Seo won the World 10‑Ball Open (Little Monster International Women's 10‑Ball Open) in Gandia, Spain, defeating world No. 8 Kelly Fisher in the final. She did this shortly after winning the Korean Sport & Olympic Committee President's Cup, demonstrating strong performances in both domestic and international competition.

Seo has also captured titles in regional events, including a victory at the Indonesian International Open as part of the Predator Pro Billiard Series in Jakarta.

== Notable Results ==
Year	Event	Location	Result
2019	Korean 10-Ball National Championship (Muan Hwangto Onion Cup)	Muan-gun, S. Korea	Winner
2021	Korean 10-Ball National Championship (President's Cup)	South Korea	Winner
2023	2023 WPA Women's World Nine-ball Championship	Atlantic City, NJ	3rd Place
2023	Korean 10-Ball National Championship (Namwon)	Namwon, S. Korea	Winner
2023	Alfa Las Vegas Women's 10-Ball Open (Predator Pro Series)	Las Vegas	Winner
2024	Korean 10-Ball National Championship (Namwon)	Namwon, S. Korea	Winner
2024	All Japan Championship	Amagasaki, Japan	Winner
2024	2024 WPA Women's World 10-Ball Championship	Puerto Rico	Runner-up
2025	Little Monster Women's 10‑Ball Open (Predator Pro Series)	Gandia, Spain	Winner
2025	Indonesia International Women's 10-Ball Open (Predator Pro Series)	Jakarta, Indonesia	Winner
2025	Korean 10-Ball National Championship (President's Cup)	South Korea	Winner
2025	2025 WPA Women's World Nine-ball Championship	Jacksonville, Florida	Winner
2026	Carrinho Women's 10-Ball Open (Predator Pro Series)	St Johann im Pongau, Austria	Winner
2026	2026 WPA Women's World 10-Ball Championship	Rome, Italy	3rd Place
2026	2026 WPA Women's World Nine-ball Championship	Bali, Indonesia	Runner-up

== Impact ==
Seo's run at the World Pool Championship in 2025 was reported as a landmark performance for a female player in an open professional event, attracting attention from international sports media.

== Personal life ==
Seoa has been a member of the Korea national pocket billiards team and has received extended corporate support through sponsorship from LG U+, which confirmed continued backing for her and teammate Lee Ha‑rin through 2027. Seoa currently resides in Incheon, South Korea. Seoa is currently in a relationship with fellow Pool Player Robbie Capito of Hong Kong.
