= Karol Skowerski =

Polish pool player

Personal information
- Nickname: "Skower"
- Born: 9 May 1984 (age 42) Kielce, Poland

Pool career
- Pool games: 9-Ball

Karol Skowerski (born 9 May 1984) is a Polish professional pool player. After reaching the last 16 of the 2012 World Pool-Billiard Association World Nine-ball Championship, Skowerski won the 2012 World Pool Masters, defeating fellow Pole Mateusz Śniegocki in the final 8–6, which was held in Kielce, Poland. Skowerski also reached the final of the 2012 World Cup of Pool, alongside Śniegocki, losing to Team Finland, Petri Makkonen and Mika Immonen 10–8.

== Titles & Achievements ==
- 2024 Polish Pool Championship Ten-Ball
- 2019 European Pool Championship Straight Pool
- 2017 Polish Pool Championship Ten-Ball
- 2012 World Pool Masters
- 2012 Polish Pool Championship Nine-Ball
- 2009 Polish Pool Championship Ten-Ball
- 2003 Polish Pool Championship Straight Pool
