= David Alcaide =

Spanish pool player (born 1978)

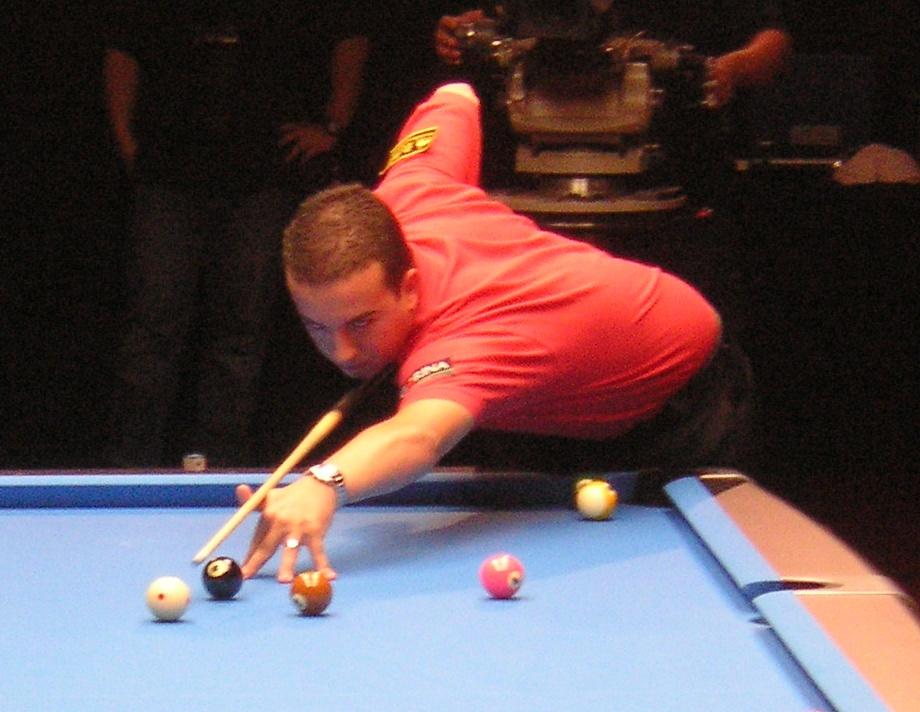
- David Alcaide at the 2021 Mosconi Cup

Personal information
- Nickname: "El Matador"
- Born: 14 December 1978 (age 47) Málaga, Spain

Pool career
- Country: Spain
- Pool games: nine-ball, ten-ball, eight-ball
- Best finish: Semi finals 2021 WPA World Nine-ball Championship

Tournament wins
- Highest rank: 17

David Alcaide Bermúdez (born 14 December 1978) is a Spanish professional pool player. He is a two-time winner of the World Pool Masters, winning the 2017 event, defeating Jayson Shaw 8–7 in the final, and again in 2019 defeating Alexander Kazakis 9–8. Alcaide is a three-time world championship semi-finalist having reached the stage at the WPA World Ten-ball Championship, in 2009 and 2015, and the WPA World Eight-ball Championship in 2011.

Alcaide has also represented Europe at the Mosconi Cup in 2006, 2017, 2021,2022, 2023, 2024 and 2025 with six wins. At the 2006 event, he was the first Spanish player to compete in the competition. In addition to pool, Alcaide also plays snooker, having competed at the 2019 Gibraltar Open professional snooker event. He has also represented Spain at the World Cup of Pool on multiple occasions, partnering fellow Spaniard Francisco Sánchez Ruiz in the events.

== Career ==
=== Nine-ball ===
Alcaide began playing pool aged 5, and became national Spanish eight-ball champion aged 14. Alcaide made his first breakthrough reaching third place at the Spanish Open in 1998. Later during the 2001 WPA World Nine-ball Championship, he reached the knockout rounds, before defeating Alex Lely 9–7 and Dimitri Jungo 9–3 to reach the last 16, before losing to Jeremy Jones 9–11. During the 2006 event he survived the group stage, before defeating Jörn Kaplan and Lee Vann Corteza but was eliminated in the round of 16 by Rodolfo Luat. Having reached the last 16, Alcaide was seeded 25th for 2007 event, and despite losing once in the double-elimination round to Muhammad Zulfikri 1–9, he reached the final rounds with a 9–0 whitewash of Stephen Capaldi and a 9–4 win over Robb Saez. However, Alcaide lost 10–1 to ninth seed Francisco Bustamante in the knockout round. In 2013, Alcaide competed at the 2013 World Games, but lost in the nine-ball event 11–7 in the last 16 to Liu Haitao. At the 2015 WPA World Nine-ball Championship, Alcaide won against Chu Bingjie and Hesam Abdulaziz in the group stage to qualify for the knockout round, before winning over Yang Ching-shun and Toh Lian Han. Alcaide lost to Wojciech Szewczyk 10–11 in the last 16.

Alcaide was the first Spanish player to represent Europe in the Mosconi Cup, which he did in 2006. Alongside fellow Mosconi Cup debutant Imran Majid, the pair defeated Earl Strickland and Johnny Archer. Alcaide finished the event with four wins and two losses, however his 5–2 loss to Corey Deuel was the last of the event, seeing the cup end tied at 12–12. Alcaide did not represent the team again, until coach Marcus Chamat played Alcaide in the 2017 Mosconi Cup as a wildcard. In 2017, Alcaide won three games, and lost once, before Europe won 11–4. Later in the season, Alcaide won the 2017 Kremlin World Cup.

Alcaide won the 2017 World Pool Masters, having defeated the defending champion Shane Van Boening in the second round, and defeating Jayson Shaw in the final 9–8. Two years later, at the 2019 World Pool Masters – a field made up of previous winners – Alcaide once again won the event beating Alexander Kazakis in the final 9–8. He came back from down 0–5 against Kazakis and hit a full table bank shot to sink the last 9-ball.

At the 2023 Mosconi Cup he made the winning pot as he defeated Shane Wolford to seal an 11–3 victory for Europe at the Alexandra Palace.

=== Other disciplines ===
In addition to nine-ball, Alcaide is an accomplished ten-ball player. At the 2009 WPA World Ten-ball Championship, Alcaide reached the knockout rounds before defeating Antonio Gabica 9–8, Chao Fong-pang 9–5, Dennis Orcollo and Darren Appleton (both 9–6) to reach the semi-finals, before losing to Lee Vann Corteza 9–7, after leading 7–6. Alcaide repeated this performance, losing only to eventual winner Dennis Orcollo and win the bronze medal at the 2011 WPA World Eight-ball Championship. In the match for third place, he won against Darren Appleton 9–2. At the 2015 WPA World Ten-ball Championship, Alcaide reached the knockout round, defeating Francisco Bustamante 11–9, Chang Jung-lin 11–8, Mieszko Fortuński 11–7 and Johann Chua 11–9 to reach a third world championship semi-final. In this semi-final, Alcaide once again lost, this time to Carlo Biado 2–11. He won one event on the Predator International ten-ball Tour, at the 2009 Portugal Open.

Alcaide is a two-time Euro Tour champion, having won both the 2009 Treviso Open and 2016 Treviso Open, reaching the final on three other occasions, and the semi-final on six occasions. In March 2019, Alcaide competed in a professional snooker ranking event when he took part in the 2019 Gibraltar Open after successfully qualifying, where he lost 1–4 to David Gilbert in the first round. Alcaide has represented Spain at the World Cup of Pool on nine occasions, alongside partner Francisco Sánchez Ruiz, but only passed the first round on three occasions. Alcaide is a several time European Pool Championships winner, having won the Straight pool championship in 2010, eight-ball in 2013 and the ten-ball event twice, in 2014 and 2016.

== Personal life ==
Alcaide was born on 14 December 1978 in Málaga, Spain, currently resides in Salamanca, and has a daughter, Daniella. He is sponsored by Pechauer Custom Cues, and plays for Club 6 in Málaga. Alcaide appeared as a color commentator for Eurosport in Spain alongside Martín Pérez and Sergio Manuel Gutiérrez.

== Career titles and achievements ==
- 2026 Men's Doubles Ten-ball World Championship
- 2025 Mosconi Cup
- 2025 Philippines Open Nine-ball Championship
- 2024 Mosconi Cup
- 2024 Morocco Open Nine-ball Championship
- 2023 Mosconi Cup
- 2023 European Open Nine-ball Championship
- 2022 Mosconi Cup
- 2022 World Cup of Pool - with (Francisco Sánchez Ruiz)
- 2021 Mosconi Cup
- 2019 World Pool Masters
- 2017 Mosconi Cup
- 2017 Kremlin Cup
- 2017 World Pool Masters
- 2016 Euro Tour Treviso Open
- 2016 European Pool Championship Ten-ball
- 2015 Spanish Pool Championship Eight-ball
- 2014 European Pool Championship Ten-ball
- 2013 Spanish Pool Championship Eight-ball
- 2013 European Pool Championship Eight-ball
- 2010 European Pool Championship 14.1
- 2009 Euro Tour Treviso Open
- 1998 VNEA International 8-Ball Championship
