= 2017 in sports =

2017 in sports describes the year's events in world sport.

== Air sports ==
=== Aerobatics ===
- July 9 – 17: 5th FAI World YAK 52 Aerobatic Championship in Tula
  - Overall winner: (Russia) Oleg Shpolianskii
  - Overall teams winners: Russia (Oleg Shpolianskii, Vladimir Kotelnikov)
- July 27 – August 5: 8th FAI World Advanced Glider Aerobatic Championships in Toruń
  - Overall Advanced winners: 1st. (Sweden) Gustav Salminen, 2nd. (France) Erwin George, 3rd: (Poland) Michał Klimaszewski
  - Advanced Teams winners: 1st: Poland (Michał Klimaszewski, Agata Nykaza, Mirosław Wrześniewski), 2nd: France (Erwin George, Benoit Madrenas, Eric Lanquetin), 3rd: Romania (Ciprian Lupaș, Valentin Hota, Gál Zsolt)
- July 27 – August 5: 20th FAI World Glider Aerobatic Championships in (Poland) Toruń
  - Overall Unlimited winners: 1st. (Hungary) Ferenc Tóth, 2nd: (Hungary) János Szilágyi, 3rd: (Italy) Luca Bertossio
  - Unlimited Teams winners: 1st: Hungary (Ferenc Tóth, János Szilágyi, János Sonkoly), 2nd: Germany (Moritz Kirchberg, Eugen Schaal, Marvin Woltering), 3rd: Austria (Siegfried Mayr, Gabriel Stangl, Bernhard Behr)
- August 3 – 13: 10th FAI European Advanced Aerobatic Championships in (Czech Republic) Chotěboř
  - Winners: 1st: (Russia) Dmitriy Samokhvalov, 2nd: (France) Loïc Lovicourt, 3rd: (Russia) Roman Ovchinnikov
  - Teams winners: 1st: Russia, 2nd: France, 3rd: Ukraine
- August 16 – 26: 29th FAI World Aerobatic Championships in (South Africa) Malalane

=== Model aircraft ===
==== Events ====
- February 19 – 25: 2017 FAI F3P World Championship for Indoor Aerobatic Model Aircraft in (France) Strasbourg
  - Winner: (Austria) Gernot Bruckmann
  - Junior winner: (Sweden) Felix Scander
  - Team winners: Austria
- March 13 – 17: 2017 FAI F1D European Championships for Free Flight Indoor Model Aircraft in Slănic
  - Winner: (Slovakia) Ivan Treger
  - Junior winner: (Romania) Călin Bulai
  - Teams winner: Romania
  - Junior teams winner: Romania
- July 16 – 22: 2017 FAI F3J European Championship for Model Gliders in Martin
  - Seniors winners: 1st place: (Croatia) Arijan Hucaljuk, 2nd place: (Ukraine) Oleksander Chekh, 3rd place: (Germany) Manuel Reinecke
  - Juniors winners: 1st place: (Bulgaria) Ivaylo Dimitrov, 2nd place: (Italy) Marco Gallizia, 3rd place: (Slovenia) Oskar Stempihar
  - Seniors teams winners: 1st place: Turkey, 2nd place: Slovakia, 3rd place: Slovenia
  - Juniors teams winners: 1st place: Germany, 2nd place: Bulgaria, 3rd place: Czech Republic
- July 21 – 30: 2017 FAI F3 World Championships for Model Helicopters in (Poland) Włocławek
  - F3C Seniors winners: 1st place: (Switzerland) Ennio Graber, 2nd place: (Japan) Hiroki Ito, 3rd place: (France) Pierre Gutierrez
  - F3C Juniors winners: 1st place: (France) Axel Mondet, 2nd place: (Austria) Thomas Rettenbacher, 3rd place: (China) Tianshi AN
  - F3C Teams winners: 1st place: France, 2nd place: Switzerland, 3rd place: Japan
  - F3N Seniors winners: 1st place: (Chinese Taipei) Ko Huan-chen, 2nd place: (Germany) Eric Weber, 3rd place: (United States) James Robertson
  - F3N Juniors winners: 1st place: (United Kingdom) Aaron Cole, 2nd place: (Denmark) Samuel Aunbirk Jensen, 3rd place: (Germany) Marcel Doring
  - F3N Teams winners: 1st place: Germany, 2nd place: United Kingdom, 3rd place: Denmark
- July 24 – 30: 2017 FAI F3K World Championship for Model Gliders in (Ukraine) Lviv
  - Seniors winners: 1st place: (Croatia) Nikola Frančić, 2nd place: (Switzerland) Cederic Duss, 3rd place: (France) Pierre Meunier
  - Juniors winners: 1st place: (Lithuania) Augis Bražiūnas, 2nd place: (Ukraine) Nikita Sholom, 3rd place: (Netherlands) Christoph Ogi
- July 25 – 29: 2017 FAI F3D World Championship for Pylon Racing Model Aircraft in (Sweden) Järna
  - Seniors winners: 1st place: (Czech Republic) Jiří Novotný, 2nd place: (Belgium) Stefan Raeven, 3rd place: (Sweden) Thomas Eriksson
  - Juniors winners: 1st place: (Australia) Daniel Arapakis, 2nd place: (Belgium) Bram Lentjes, 3rd place: (Sweden) Johannes Reutenberg
  - Teams winners: 1st place: Australia, 2nd place: United States, 3rd place: Italy
- July 30 – August 6: 2017 FAI F1 Junior European Championships for Free Flight Model Aircraft in (North Macedonia) Prilep
  - F1A winners: 1st place: (Slovenia) Martin Bencik, 2nd place: (Russia) Alexey Khoroshev, 3rd place: (Israel) Sagi Brudni
  - F1B winners: 1st place: (Serbia) Bojan Gostojic, 2nd place: (Germany) Sebastian Jäckel, 3rd place: (Israel) Omri Sela
  - F1P winners: 1st place: (Russia) Maksim Poliakov, 2nd place: (Russia) Ilya Trapeznikov, 3rd place: (Poland) Michał Krężel
- August 5 – 12: 2017 FAI F2 European Championships for Control Line Model Aircraft in (Hungary) Békéscsaba
  - F2A winners: 1st: (Italy) Luca Grossi, 2nd: (Hungary) Ferenc Szvacsek, 3rd: (Ukraine) Oleksandr Osovyk
  - Junior F2A winners: 1st: (Ukraine) Illia Rediuk, 2nd: (Russia) Alexey Emelyanov, 3rd: (Poland) Kacper Walania
  - F2B winners: 1st: (Slovakia) Igor Burger, 2nd: (Italy) Marco Valiera, 3rd: (Czech Republic) Zbynek Kravcik
  - Junior F2B winners: 1st: (Russia) Yaroslav Fokin, 2nd: (Czech Republic) Jan Kopriva, 3rd: (Ukraine) Mykola Kucher
  - F2B Teams winners: 1st: Ukraine, 2nd: Czech Republic, 3rd: Russia
  - Junior F2C Teams winners: 1st: Russia, 2nd: Ukraine, 3rd: Poland
  - F2D winners: 1st: Spain, 2nd: Lithuania, 3rd: Russia
- August 6 – 12: 2017 FAI F3B World Championship for Model Gliders in (Czech Republic) Jeseník
  - Winners: 1st: (Austria) Bernhard Flixeder, 2nd: (Germany) Andreas Herrig, 3rd: (Germany) Johannes Krischke
- August 6 – 13: 2017 FAI F1 World Championships for Free Flight Model Aircraft in (Hungary) Szentes
  - F1A winners: 1st: (Croatia) Igor Bombek, 2nd: (Croatia) Robert Lesko, 3rd: (Romania) Julien Sion
  - F1A Teams winners: 1st: France, 2nd: United Kingdom, 3rd: Slovenia
  - F1B winners: (Ukraine) Stepan Stefanchuk, (Israel) Gilad Mark, 3rd: (Lithuania) Rolandas Mackus
  - F1B Teams winners: 1st: Serbia, 2nd: Israel, 3rd: Lithuania
  - F1C winners: 1st: (Canada) Yuri Shvedenkov, 2nd: (Poland) Edward Burek, 3rd: (Estonia) Raimond Naaber
  - F1C Teams winners: 1st: China, 2nd: France, 3rd: United Kingdom
- August 19 – 27: 2017 FAI S European Championships for Space Models in (Poland) Nowy Targ
- August 21 – 27: 2017 FAI F1E World Championships for Free Flight Model Aircraft in (Romania) Turda
- November 18 – 28: 2017 FAI F3A World Championship for Aerobatic Model Aircraft in Argentina

=== Hot air ballooning ===
- August 22 – 27: 20th FAI European Hot Air Balloon Championship in (France) Brissac-Quincé
- September 4 – 9: 4th FAI Women's European Hot Air Balloon Championship in (Poland) Leszno
- September 7 – 16: 61st Coupe Aéronautique Gordon Bennett in (Switzerland) Gruyères

=== General aviation ===
==== Events ====
- July 28 – August 3: 23rd FAI World Precision Flying Championship at (Austria) Spitzerberg Airport
  - Winners: 1st: (Poland) Krzysztof Skrętowicz, 2nd: (Poland) Janusz Darocha, 3rd: (Poland) Michał Wieczorek
  - Teams winners: 1st: Poland, 2nd: Czech Republic, 3rd: France
- September 11 – 16: 1st FAI World Air Navigation Race Championship in (Spain) Castellón
- September 13 – 17: 54th National Championship Air Races at (United States) Reno Stead Airport

=== Gliding ===
- January 8 – 21: 34th FAI World Gliding Championships in (Australia) Benalla
  - 15 m winner: (Poland) Sebastian Kawa
  - 18 m winner: (France) Killian Walbrou
  - Open winner: (United Kingdom) Russell Cheetham
- May 17 – June 4: 9th FAI Women's World Gliding Championship in (Czech Republic) Zbraslavice
  - Club winner: (Germany) Sabrina Vogt (Glasflügel H-201)
  - Standard winner: (France) Aude Grangeray (Schempp-Hirth Discus-2)
  - 18 m winner: (Germany) Katrin Senne (Schleicher ASG 29)
- June 10 – 17: Uppsala Masters at (Sweden) Sundbro Airport
  - Class winner: (Sweden) Jan-Ola Nordh
  - Open winner: (Sweden) Börje Eriksson
- June 29 – July 16: 2nd FAI World 13.5m Class Gliding Championship in (Hungary) Szatymaz
  - Winner: (Poland) Sebastian Kawa, 2nd place: (Germany) Uli Schwenk, 3rd place: (Argentina) Sebastian Riera
- July 20 – August 6: 19th FAI European Gliding Championships in (Czech Republic) Moravská Třebová
  - Club winners: 1st: (Netherlands) Tim Kuijpers, 2nd: (Slovenia) Boris Zorz, 3rd: (Germany) Fabian Peitz
  - Standard winners: 1st: (Czech Republic) Pavel Louzecky, 2nd: (Czech Republic) Miloslav Cink, 3rd: (Belgium) Jeroen Jennen
  - Double Seater winners: 1st: Poland (Kawa & Matkowski), 2nd: United Kingdom (Jones & Coppin), 3rd: Switzerland (Cronjaeger & Heidemeyer)
- July 27 – August 13: 10th FAI Junior World Gliding Championships in (Lithuania) Kaunas
  - Club winners: 1st: (Germany) Julian Klemm, 2nd: (Austria) Paul Altrichter, 3rd: (Germany) Stefan Langer
  - Standard winners: 1st: (Netherlands) Sjoerd van Empelen, 2nd: (Lithuania) Ignas Bitinaitis, 3rd: (Lithuania) Joris Vainius
- August 10 – 26: 19th FAI European Gliding Championships at (United Kingdom) Lasham Airfield
- November 26 – December 8: 2nd FAI Pan-American Gliding Championship in (Argentina) Santa Rosa de Conlara

==== 2017 Grand Prix gliding ====
- December 14 – 20, 2016: Sailplane Grand Prix #1 in (Australia) Horsham
  - Winner: (Australia) Geoff Brown (Jonker JS-1 Revelation)
- March 26 – April 1: Sailplane Grand Prix #2 in (United States) Orlando
  - Winner: (Canada) Jerzy Szemplinski (Schleicher ASG 29)
- April 17 – 22: Sailplane Grand Prix #3 in (South Africa) Magaliesburg
  - Winner: (South Africa) Laurens Goudriaan (Jonker JS-1 Revelation)
- May 7 – 14: Sailplane Grand Prix #4 in (Spain) Santa Cilia
  - Winner: (United Kingdom) Jon Gatfield (Schleicher ASG 29)
- May 27 – June 3: Sailplane Grand Prix #5 in (Poland) Wrocław
  - Winner: (Poland) Sebastian Kawa (Jonker JS-1 Revelation)
- June 10 – 17: Sailplane Grand Prix #6 in (Italy) Varese
  - Winner: (Italy) Giorgio Galetto (Schempp-Hirth Ventus-3)
- June 25 – July 1: Sailplane Grand Prix #7 in (France) Buno-Bonnevaux
  - Winner: (France) Christophe Abadie (Schleicher ASG 29)
- July 29 – August 5: Sailplane Grand Prix #8 in (Slovakia) Partizánske
  - Winner: (Czech Republic) Roman Mracek (Schleicher ASG 29)
- August 19 – 26: Sailplane Grand Prix #9 in (Slovenia) Celje
  - Winner: (Slovenia) Boštjan Pristavec (Jonker JS-1 Revelation)
- January 1 – 31, 2018: Sailplane Grand Prix #10 in (Chile) Vitacura (World final)

=== Hang gliding ===
- July 24 – August 6: 20th FAI World Hang Gliding Class 2 Championship in (France) Aspres-sur-Buëch
  - Class 2 winners: 1st: (Austria) Manfred Ruhmer, 2nd: (France) Jacques Bott, 3rd: (Austria) Franz Pacheiner
  - Class 5 winners: 1st: (France) Patrick Chopard Lallier, 2nd: (Austria) Christopher Friedl, 3rd: (Austria) Walter Geppert
- August 6 – 19: 14th FAI Women's World Hang Gliding Championship in (Brazil) Brasília
  - Cancelled due to lack of pilots.
- August 6 – 19: 21st FAI World Hang Gliding Class 1 Championship in (Brazil) Brasília
  - Winners: 1st. (Czech Republic) Petr Beneš, 2nd. (Italy) Alessandro Ploner, 3rd. (Italy) Christian Chiech
  - Teams winners: 1st. Italy, 2nd. Czech Republic, 3rd. Germany

=== Ultralight aviation ===
- April 28 – May 7: 2017 FAI Asian-Oceanic Paramotor Championships in Lopburi
  - Winners: 1st place: Thailand, 2nd place: Qatar, 3rd place: Australia
- August 12 – 19: 14th FAI European Microlight Championships at the (Hungary) Nagykanizsa Airport
  - RAL1 class winner: (Czech Republic) Jiri Krajcza
  - RAL2 class winners: Czech Republic (Petr Jonás & Lucie Krameriusová)
  - RGL2 class winners: Poland (Alojzy Dernbach & Klaudia Laskowska)
  - RWL1 class winner: (Russia) Andrey Shchekoldin
  - RWL2 class winners: Russia (Maksim Semenov & Alfiia Semenova)
- August 26 – September 2: 2017 FAI European Paramotor Championships in (Czech Republic) Přerov
  - Winners: 1st. (France) Alex Mateos. 2nd: (France) Marie Mateos, 3rd: (France) Pierre Lefebvre

=== Parachuting ===
==== Paraski World Cup ====
- January 20 – 22: Paraski World Cup Series #1 in (Austria) Bad Leonfelden
  - Winners: (Germany) Haibel Reinhold (m) / (Switzerland) Erica Franz (f)
  - Junior winner: (Austria) Sebastian Graser
  - Master Mix winner: (Germany) Andreas Fischer
  - Team Combined winners: (Austria) HSV Red Bull Salzburg 1
  - Individual accuracy winner: (Czech Republic) Milan Palo
- February 3 – 5: Paraski World Cup Series #2 in (Germany) Unterammergau
  - Winners: (Austria) Sebastian Graser (m) / (Austria) Magdalena Schwertl (f)
  - Junior winner: (Austria) Sebastian Graser
  - Master Mix winner: (Austria) Toni Gruber
  - Team Combined winners: (Austria) HSV Red Bull Salzburg 1
- February 17 – 19: Paraski World Cup Series #3 (final) in (Czech Republic) Železná Ruda
  - Winners: (Austria) Sebastian Graser (m) / (Austria) Magdalena Schwertl (f)
  - Junior winner: (Austria) Sebastian Graser
  - Master Mix winner: (Austria) Toni Gruber
  - Team Combined winners: (Austria) HSV Red Bull Salzburg 1

==== Events ====
- March 7 – 11: 16th FAI World Para-Ski Championships in St. Johann in Tirol
  - Individual winners: (Russia) Alexey Burenin (m) / (Austria) Magdalena Schwertl
  - Team winners: Russia 1 (Anton Filippov, Alexey Burenin, Ayaz Karimov, Artur Bikmetov) (m) / Austria (Magdalena Schwertl, Marina Kücher)
  - Junior winner: (Austria) Sebastian Graser
  - Master Mix winner: (Austria) Toni Gruber
- July 11 – 20: 41st CISM World Military Parachuting Championship in (Germany) Warendorf
  - Individual Overall winners: (Germany) Elischa Weber (m) / (Russia) Olga Lepezina
  - Juniors Overall winners: (China) Tianbo Gao (m) / (Belarus) Darja Shastakovich (f)
  - Nation Overall winners: Russia (m) / Russia (f)
  - Formation team winners: Belgium (m) / France (f)
  - Individual Style winners: (Germany) Elischa Weber (m) / (France) Léocadie Ollivier de Pury (f)
  - Individual Style Juniors winners: (China) Tianbo Gao (m) / (Belarus) Darja Shastakovich (f)
  - Individual Accuracy winners: (Czech Republic) Miroslav Kříž (m) / (China) Siwei Liu (f)
  - Individual Accuracy Juniors winners: (China) Zhang Zuolei (m) / (Belarus) Darja Shastakovich (f)
  - Team Accuracy winners: China (m) / Belarus (f)
- August 7 – 12: 14th FAI European Formation Skydiving Championships in (Germany) Saarlouis
  - Winners: (Belgium) Hayabusa NMP PCH (m) / VR4 France Femmes (f)
  - Vertical Formation Skydiving winners: (Russia) Vertical Fly Station
  - Formation Skydiving 8-Way winners: (Russia) Tanay-8
- August 7 – 12: 12th FAI World Cup of Artistic Events in (Germany) Saarlouis
  - Freestyle winners: 1st: Russia, 2nd: Slovakia, 3rd: United Kingdom
  - Freefly winners: 1st: France 2, 2nd: United States, 3rd: France 1
- August 7 – 12: 21st FAI World Cup of Formation Skydiving in (Germany) Saarlouis
  - Winners: (Belgium) Hayabusa NMP PCH (m) / VR4 France Femmes (f)
  - Vertical Formation Skydiving winners: (United States) SDC Core
  - Formation Skydiving 8-Way winners: (United States) Golden Knights
- August 7 – 12: 2nd FAI European Speed Skydiving Championships in (Germany) Saarlouis
  - Winners: 1st: (Germany) Thomas Moritz Friess, 2nd: (United Kingdom) Charles Hurd, 3rd: (Sweden) Henrik Raimer
- August 7 – 12: 7th FAI European Canopy Formation Championships in (Germany) Saarlouis
  - 2-Way Sequential winners: 1st: France CF A, 2nd: Russia CF, 3rd: France CF B
- August 7 – 12: 3rd FAI World Cup of Speed Skydiving in (Germany) Saarlouis
  - Winners: 1st: (Germany) Thomas Moritz Friess, 2nd: (United Kingdom) Charles Hurd, 3rd: (Sweden) Henrik Raimer
- August 7 – 12: 11th FAI European Artistic Events Championships in (Germany) Saarlouis
  - Freestyle winners: 1st: Russia, 2nd: Slovakia, 3rd: United Kingdom
  - Freefly winners: France 2, 2nd: France 1, 3rd: Norway
- August 7 – 12: 9th FAI World Cup of Canopy Formation in (Germany) Saarlouis
  - 2-Way Sequential winners: 1st: France CF A, 2nd: Russia CF, 3rd: France CF B
- August 24 – 31: 6th FAI Junior European Freefall Style and Accuracy Landing Championships in (Montenegro) Podgorica
  - Juniors Overall winners: (Czech Republic) Petr Chladek (m) / (Russia) Maria Elkina (f)
  - Individual Accuracy Juniors winners: (Czech Republic) Petr Chladek (m) / (Russia) Maria Elkina (f)
  - Individual Style Juniors winners: (Germany) Lukas Tschech (m) / (Russia) Kseniia Fominykh (f)
- August 24 – 31: 9th FAI European Freefall Style and Accuracy Landing Championships in (Montenegro) Podgorica
  - Individual Overall winners: (Czech Republic) Jiri Gecnuk (m) / (Russia) Liubov Ekshikeeva (f)
  - Individual Accuracy winners: (Hungary) István Asztalos (m) / (Belarus) Nataliia Nikitsiuk (f)
  - Individual Style winners: (Czech Republic) Libor Jirousek (m) / (Russia) Liubov Ekshikeeva (f)
  - Team Accuracy winners: Belarus (m) / Russia (f)
  - Nation Overall winners: Czech Republic (m) / Russia (f)
- October 20 – 22: 2nd FAI World Indoor Skydiving Championships in Laval
  - Open 4-Way Formation Tournament winners: 1st. Belgium 1, 2nd. France, 3rd. United States
  - Women's 4-Way Formation Tournament winners: 1st. France 1, 2nd. United Kingdom, 3rd. Czech Republic
  - Junior 4-Way Formation Tournament winners: 1st. France 1, 2nd. Canada, 3rd. Czech Republic
  - Vertical Formation Skydiving winners: 1st. France 1, 2nd. United States, 3rd. Poland
  - Dynamic 2-Way Tournament winners: 1st. Poland 1, 2nd. Singapore, 3rd. France
  - Dynamic 4-Way Tournament winners: 1st. France, 2nd. Czech Republic, 3rd. Switzerland
  - Open Indoor Freestyle winners: 1st. Russia, 2nd. Poland, 3rd. Czech Republic
  - Junior Indoor Freestyle winners: 1st. Singapore, 2nd. United States, 3rd. Poland
- November 2 – 8: 2nd FAI World Cup of Wingsuit Flying in United States
  - Wingsuit Performance winners: 1st. (United States) Chris Geiler, 2nd. (United States) Alexey Galda, 3rd. (United States) Travis Mickle
  - Wingsuit Acrobatic winners: 1st. United States 2 (Wicked Wingsuits), 2nd. United States 1 (Flatspin), 3rd. Russia (Sky Republic)
- November 27 – December 1: 9th FAI World Cup of Canopy Piloting in (United Arab Emirates) Dubai

=== Paragliding ===
==== 2017 Paragliding World Cup ====
- January 17 – 28: World Cup Superfinal in (Brazil) Governador Valadares
  - Men's winner: (Italy) Aaron Durogati
  - Women's winner: (France) Seiko Fukuoka Naville
  - Teams winner: (South Korea) Gin Gliders
- May 20 – 27: Paragliding World Cup #1 in (France) Cœur de Savoie
  - Men's winner: (France) Luc Armant
  - Women's winner: (France) Méryl Delferriere
  - Teams winner: (France) Ozone Paragliders ( (United Kingdom) Russel Ogden, (France) Luc Armant, (France) Honorin Hamard, (France) Seiko Fukuoka Naville)
- June 17 – 24: Paragliding World Cup #2 in (Serbia) Niš
  - Men's winner: (France) Stéphane Drouin
  - Women's winner: (Japan) Atsuko Yamashita
  - Teams winners: (France) Air'G Products ( (Argentina) Hernan Pitocco, (Slovenia) Jošt Napret, (Germany) Richard Gallon, (Russia) Daria Krasnova)
- August 5 – 12: Paragliding World Cup #3 in (Switzerland) Disentis
  - Men's winner: (Switzerland) Alfredo Studer
  - Women's winner: (France) Seiko Fukuoka Naville
  - Teams winner: (France) Ozone Paragliders ( (France) Charles Cazaux, (France) Julien Wirtz, (France) Seiko Fukuoka Naville, (Germany) Ulrich Prinz)
- September 2 – 9: Paragliding World Cup #4 in (Brazil) Pico do Gavião
  - Men's winner: (Brazil) Rafael Saldini
  - Women's winner: (Italy) Silvia Buzzi Ferraris
  - Teams winner: (Brazil) Kortel Design (Clayton Resende, Marcelo Prieto, Rafael Saldini, Marcella Uchôa)
- October 28 – November 4: Paragliding World Cup #5 in (Ecuador) Guayaquil
  - Men's winner: (France) Honorin Hamard
  - Women's winner: (Switzerland) Yael Margelisch
  - Teams winner: (France) Ozone Paragliders
- January 9 – 20, 2018: 2017 Paragliding World Cup Superfinal in (Colombia) Roldanillo

==== 2017 Paragliding Accuracy World Cup ====
- March 16 – 20: Paragliding Accuracy World Cup #1 in (Indonesia) Manado
  - Winners: (Indonesia) Rio Indrakusumah (m) / (South Korea) Kang In-suk
  - Teams winners: (Indonesia) Garuda Prima 6
- April 7 – 9: Paragliding Accuracy World Cup #2 in (Serbia) Vršac
  - Winners: (Indonesia) Indra Lesmana (m) / (Indonesia) Rika Wijayanti (f)
  - Teams winners: (Indonesia) Garuda Prima 2
- July 21 – 23: Paragliding Accuracy World Cup #3 in (Canada) Mont-Saint-Pierre, Quebec
  - Winners: (Indonesia) Hening Paradigma (m) / (Indonesia) Sirin Milawati (f)
  - Teams winners: (Indonesia) Garuda Prima 1
- September 22 – 24: Paragliding Accuracy World Cup #4 in (Slovenia) Kobarid (final)
  - Winners: (Czech Republic) Tomas Lednik (m) / (Czech Republic) Marketa Tomaskova (f)
  - Teams winners: No Name Team (Goran Djurkovic, Dragan Popov, Dejan Valek, Ivan Pavlov)

==== Other in Paragliding ====
- January 19 – 22: 1st Paragliding ASEAN Friendships Open in (Thailand) Nong Khai
  - Overall winner: (Thailand) Tanapat Luangam
  - Women's winner: (Thailand) Nannapat Phuchong
  - Teams winner: (Thailand) Bueng Kan
- May 5 – 14: 9th FAI World Paragliding Accuracy Championship in (Albania) Vlorë
  - Winner: (Bulgaria) Tzvetan Tzolov (Gradient Bright 5)
  - Women's winner: (Thailand) Nunnapat Puchong
  - Team winners: China
- July 1 – 15: 15th FAI World Paragliding Championship in (Italy) Pedavena
  - Overall winner: (France) Pierre Remy
  - Women's winner: (France) Seiko Fukuoka Naville
  - Teams winners: France (Pierre Remy, Honorin Hamard, Luc Armant, Julien Wirtz, Laurie Genovese)

== American football ==
- Super Bowl LI – the New England Patriots (AFC) won 34–28 (OT) over the Atlanta Falcons (NFC)
  - Location: NRG Stadium
  - Attendance: 70,807
  - MVP: Tom Brady, QB (New England)

== Archery ==
- November 26, 2016 – October 22, 2017: WA's Calendar of Events

=== Indoor archery ===
- November 26 & 27, 2016: IA World Cup #1 in (Morocco) Marrakesh
  - Recurve winners: (United States) Brady Ellison (m) / (United Kingdom) Bryony Pitman (f)
  - Compound winners: (Denmark) Stephan Hansen (m) / (South Africa) Danelle Wentzel (f)
- December 10 & 11, 2016: IA World Cup #2 in (Thailand) Bangkok
  - Recurve winners: (South Korea) KIM Jae-hyeong (m) / (South Korea) SONG Ji-yung (f)
  - Compound winners: (Netherlands) Mike Schloesser (m) / (Belgium) Sarah Prieels (f)
- January 20 – 22: IA World Cup #3 in (France) Nîmes
  - Recurve winners: (France) Jean-Charles Valladont (m) / (Italy) Claudia Mandia (f)
  - Compound winners: (Denmark) Stephan Hansen (m) / (Denmark) Tanja Jensen (f)
- February 10 – 12: IA World Cup #4 (final) in (United States) Las Vegas
  - Recurve winners: (United States) Brady Ellison (m) / (South Korea) PARK Se-hui (f)
  - Compound winners: (Netherlands) Mike Schloesser (m) / (Denmark) Tanja Jensen (f)
- March 7 – 12: 2017 WAE Indoor European Archery Championships in Vittel
  - Recurve winners: (Italy) David Pasqualucci (m) / (Ukraine) Veronika Marchenko (f)
  - Team recurve winners: Italy (Marco Galiazzo, Massimiliano Mandia, David Pasqualucci) (m) / Poland (Karolina Farasiewicz, Natalia Leśniak, Wioleta Myszor)
  - Junior recurve winners: (Turkey) Erdal Meriç Dal (m) / (Italy) Tatiana Andreoli (f)
  - Junior team recurve winners: France (Thomas Chirault, Thomas Koenig, Valentin Ripaux) / Italy (Tatiana Andreoli, Tanya Giaccheri, Vanessa Landi)
  - Compound winners: (Italy) Jacopo Polidori (m) / (Russia) Alexandra Savenkova (f)
  - Team compound winners: Italy (Michele Nencioni, Sergio Pagni, Jacopo Polidori) / Denmark (Erika Anear, Tanja Jensen, Sarah Sonnichsen) (f)
  - Junior compound winners: (Austria) Nico Wiener (m) / (Poland) Mariya Shkolna (f)
  - Junior team compound winners: Denmark (Christoffer Berg, Simon Olsen, Sune Rasmussen) / Estonia (Emily Hoim, Lisell Jaatma, Meeri-Marita Paas) (f)

=== Outdoor archery ===
- May 16 – 21: WA World Cup #1 in (China) Shanghai
  - Recurve winners: (Netherlands) Steve Wijler (m) / (South Korea) Ki Bo-bae (f)
  - Compound winners: (Denmark) Stephan Hansen (m) / (Colombia) Sara López (f)
  - Recurve team winners: Kazakhstan (m) / Russia (f)
  - Compound team winners: India (m) / South Korea (f)
  - Mixed team winners: South Korea (Compound) / Chinese Taipei (Recurve)
- June 6 – 11: WA World Cup #2 in (Turkey) Antalya
  - Recurve winners: (France) Jean-Charles Valladont (m) / (Russia) Ksenia Perova (f)
  - Compound winners: (Chinese Taipei) Chen Hsiang-Hsuan (m) / (Denmark) Sarah Sonnichsen (f)
  - Recurve team winners: Italy (m) / Chinese Taipei (f)
  - Compound team winners: Denmark (m) / Denmark (f)
  - Mixed team winners: Denmark (Compound) / Chinese Taipei (Recurve)
- June 20 – 25: WA World Cup #3 in (United States) Salt Lake City
  - Recurve winners: (South Korea) Im Dong-hyun (m) / (South Korea) Chang Hye-jin (f)
  - Compound winners: (Netherlands) Mike Schloesser (m) / (Spain) Andrea Marcos (f)
  - Recurve team winners: Russia (m) / Chinese Taipei (f)
  - Compound team winners: South Korea (m) / South Korea (f)
  - Mixed team winners: Colombia (Compound) / South Korea (Recurve)
- August 8 – 13: WA World Cup #4 in (Germany) Berlin
  - Recurve winners: (South Korea) Kim Woo-jin (m) / (South Korea) KANG Chae-young (f)
  - Compound winners: (Turkey) Demir Elmaağaçlı (m) / (Denmark) Sarah Sonnichsen (f)
  - Recurve team winners: France (m) / South Korea (f)
  - Compound team winners: The United States (m) / The United States (f)
  - Mixed team winners: The United States (Compound) / South Korea (Recurve)
- August 22 – 26: 2017 WAE Field Archery European Championships in (Slovenia) Mokrice Catez
  - Italy won both the gold and overall medal tallies.
- September 2 & 3: WA World Cup #5 (final) in (Italy) Rome
  - Recurve winners: (South Korea) Kim Woo-jin (m) / (South Korea) Ki Bo-bae (f)
  - Compound winners: (United States) Braden Gellenthien (m) / (Colombia) Sara López (f)
  - Mixed team winners: Denmark (Compound) / South Korea (Recurve)
- September 12 – 17: 2017 World Para Archery Championships in Beijing
  - Recurve winners: (China) ZHAO Lixue (m) / (Iran) Zahra Nemati (f)
  - Compound winners: (China) AI Xinliang (m) / (China) ZHOU Jiamin (f)
  - W1 winners: (United States) Jeff Fabry (m) / (United Kingdom) Jessica Stretton (f)
  - Mixed team winners: Russia (Compound) / Italy (Recurve)
  - Recurve team winners: Russia (m) / China (f)
  - Compound team winners: Italy (m) / Iran (f)
  - W1 Team winners: Turkey (m) / Great Britain (f)
- September 19 – 24: 2017 World Archery 3D Championships in (France) Robion
  - Barebow winners: (Spain) Cesar Vera Bringas (m) / (Sweden) Jessica Lindblom (f)
  - Compound winners: (France) Joan Pauner (m) / (France) Ama Aude (f)
  - Instinctive Bow winners: (Denmark) Zibrandt Christensen (m) / (Austria) Heldis Zahlberger (f)
  - Longbow winners: (France) Robin Gardeur (m) / (Italy) Giulia Barbaro (f)
  - Team winners: United States (m) / Italy (f)
- October 2 – 8: 2017 World Youth Archery Championships in (Argentina) Rosario
  - Junior recurve winners: (South Korea) JEONG Tae-yeong (m) / (South Korea) KIM Kyoung-eun (f)
  - Cadet recurve winners: (Chinese Taipei) TANG Chih-Chun (m) / (South Korea) PARK So-hui (f)
  - Junior compound winners: (United States) Curtis Broadnax (m) / (United States) Alexis Ruiz (f)
  - Cadet compound winners: (Puerto Rico) Bryan Alvarado Fernandez (m) / (United Kingdom) Lucy Mason (f)
  - Junior recurve Team winners: South Korea (m) / Italy (f)
  - Cadet recurve Team winners: United States (m) / Japan (f)
  - Mixed recurve team winners: India (junior) / Chinese Taipei (cadet)
  - Junior compound team winners: Mexico (m) / Mexico (f)
  - Cadet compound team winners: United States (m) / Mexico (f)
  - Mixed compound team winners: Great Britain (junior) / Turkey (cadet)
- October 15 – 22: 2017 World Archery Championships in Mexico City
  - South Korea won both the gold and overall medal tallies.

== Baseball ==
=== World Baseball Classic ===
- March 7 – 22: 2017 World Baseball Classic (championship game at Dodger Stadium in Los Angeles)
  - The United States defeated Puerto Rico, 8–0, to win their first World Baseball Classic title. Japan took third place.

=== Major League Baseball ===
- April 2 – October 1: 2017 Major League Baseball season
  - American League winners: (Texas) Houston Astros
  - National League winners: (California) Los Angeles Dodgers
- June 12 – 14: 2017 Major League Baseball draft in Secaucus, New Jersey
  - #1 pick: (California) Royce Lewis (to the Minnesota Twins from (California) JSerra Catholic High School)
- July 11: 2017 Major League Baseball All-Star Game in (Florida) Miami at Marlins Park
  - The American League defeated the National League, 2–1.
  - MVP: (Dominican Republic) Robinson Canó ( (Washington (state)) Seattle Mariners)
  - 2017 Major League Baseball Home Run Derby winner: (California) Aaron Judge ( (New York (state)) New York Yankees)
  - 2017 All-Star Futures Game: The World Team defeated the United States, 7–6.
  - 2017 All-Star Futures Game MVP: (Georgia (U.S. state)) Brent Honeywell ( (Florida) Tampa Bay Rays)
- October 24 – November 1: 2017 World Series
  - The (Texas) Houston Astros defeated the (California) Los Angeles Dodgers, 4–3 in games played, to win their first World Series title.

=== WBSC ===
- July 28 – August 6: 2017 12U Baseball World Cup in Tainan
  - The United States defeated Chinese Taipei, 7–2, to win their third consecutive 12U Baseball World Cup title. Mexico took third place.
- September 1 – 10: 2017 U-18 Baseball World Cup in (Canada) Thunder Bay
  - The United States defeated South Korea, 8–0, to win their fourth consecutive and ninth overall U-18 Baseball World Cup title. Japan took third place.

=== Little League Baseball tournaments ===
- July 29 – August 5: 2017 Senior League World Series in (South Carolina) Easley
  - (Panama) Team Latin America (Aguadulce, Coclé) defeated (United States) Team Southeast ( (Florida) Coral Springs), 5–4, in the final.
- July 30 – August 6: 2017 Intermediate League World Series in (California) Livermore
  - Team Puerto Rico defeated (United States) Team East (New Jersey), 6–5, in the final.
- August 13 – 20: 2017 Junior League World Series in (Michigan) Taylor
  - (Chinese Taipei) Team Asia–Pacific (Taoyuan, Taiwan) defeated (United States) Team East ( (Pennsylvania) Kennett Square), 12–1, in the final.
- August 17 – 27: 2017 Little League World Series in (Pennsylvania) South Williamsport
  - Team Japan (Tokyo Kitasuna LL) defeated (United States) Team Southwest ( (Texas) Lufkin), 12–2, in the final.

== Basketball ==
=== FIBA ===
Africa

- July 13 – 22: 2017 FIBA U16 African Championship in (Mauritius) Vacoas-Phoenix
  - Mali defeated Egypt, 76–65, to win their first FIBA U16 African Championship title.
  - Algeria took third place.
- August 4 – 12: 2017 FIBA U16 Women's African Championship in (Mozambique) Maputo
  - Mali defeated Angola, 68–29, to win their fifth consecutive FIBA U16 Women's African Championship title.
  - Egypt took third place.
- August 18 – 27: 2017 Women's Afrobasket in Bamako
  - Nigeria defeated Senegal, 65–48, to win their third FIBA AfroBasket Women title.
  - Mali took third place.
- September 8 – 16: FIBA AfroBasket 2017 in Tunis and Dakar
  - Tunisia defeated Nigeria, 77–65, to win their second AfroBasket title.
  - Senegal took third place.

Asia

- January 29 – February 2: 2017 WABA Championship in Amman
  - Champions: Lebanon (10 points); Second: Iran (9 points); Third: Jordan (8 points)
  - Note: Along with the three teams mentioned above, Iraq and Syria have qualified to compete in the 2017 FIBA Asia Cup.
- April 2 – 8: 2017 FIBA U16 Asian Championship in Foshan
  - Australia defeated China, 91–67, to win their first FIBA U16 Asian Championship title.
  - New Zealand took third place.
- May 12 – 18: 2017 SEABA Championship in Quezon City
  - Champions: Philippines (12 points); Second: Indonesia (11 points); Third: Thailand (10 points)
  - Note: The Philippines have qualified to compete in the 2017 FIBA Asia Cup.
- May 26 – 28: 2017 FIBA 3x3 U18 Asia Cup for Men and Women in Cyberjaya
  - Men -> Champions: China; Second: Chinese Taipei; Third: Qatar
  - Women -> Champions: Indonesia; Second: Malaysia; Third: China
- June 3 – 7: 2017 EABA Championship in Nagano
  - Chinese Taipei defeated South Korea, 77–64, to win their first EABA Championship title. Japan took third place.
- July 23 – 29: 2017 FIBA Women's Asia Cup in (India) Bangalore
  - Japan defeated Australia, 74–73, to win their third consecutive and fourth overall FIBA Women's Asia Cup title.
  - China took third place.
- August 8 – 20: 2017 FIBA Asia Cup in (Lebanon) Zouk Mosbeh
  - Australia defeated Iran, 79–56, to win their first FIBA Asia Cup title.
  - South Korea took third place.
- September 22 – 30: 2017 FIBA Asia Champions Cup in Chenzhou
  - (Lebanon) Al Riyadi defeated China Kashgar, 88–59, to win their second FIBA Asia Champions Cup title.
  - (Kazakhstan) BC Astana took third place.
- October 22 – 28: 2017 FIBA U16 Women's Asian Championship in (India) Bangalore
  - Australia defeated Japan, 61–60, to win their first FIBA U16 Women's Asian Championship title.
  - China took third place.
- October 27 – 29: FIBA 3x3 Asia Cup 2017 in Ulaanbaatar
  - Mongolia defeated New Zealand, 19–14, in the final. Australia took third place.

Americas

- June 7 – 11: 2017 FIBA Under-16 Women's Americas Championship in Buenos Aires
  - The United States defeated Canada, 91–46, to win their fourth FIBA Under-16 Women's Americas Championship title.
  - Argentina won the bronze medal.
  - Note: All three teams mentioned here, plus Colombia, have qualified to compete at the 2018 FIBA Under-17 Women’s Basketball World Cup.
- June 14 – 18: 2017 FIBA Americas Under-16 Championship in Formosa
  - The United States defeated Canada, 111–60, to win their fifth consecutive FIBA Americas Under-16 Championship title.
  - Puerto Rico won the bronze medal.
  - Note: All three teams mentioned above, plus Argentina and the Dominican Republic, have qualified to compete at the 2018 FIBA Under-17 Basketball World Cup.
- July 12 – 16: 2017 Women's Centrobasket Championship in (United States Virgin Islands) Saint Thomas, U.S. Virgin Islands
  - Champions: Virgin Islands; Second: Mexico; Third: Puerto Rico
  - Note: All three teams mentioned here have qualified to compete at the 2017 FIBA Women's AmeriCup.
- July 15 – 21: 2017 FIBA South America Under-17 Championship for Men in (Peru) Lima
  - Chile defeated Argentina, 70–60, to win their first Men's FIBA South America Under-17 Championship title.
  - Ecuador won the bronze medal.
- July 26 – 30: 2017 Under-17 Centrobasket in Santo Domingo
  - The Dominican Republic defeated Puerto Rico, 81–80, in the final. Panama took third place.
- August 7 – 13: 2017 FIBA Women's AmeriCup in Buenos Aires
  - Canada defeated Argentina, 67–65, to win their second consecutive and third overall FIBA Women's AmeriCup title.
  - Puerto Rico won the bronze medal.
  - Note: All three teams mentioned above all qualified to compete at the 2018 FIBA Women's Basketball World Cup.
- August 15 – 19: 2017 Women's Under-17 Centrobasket Championship in Aguada
  - Mexico defeated Puerto Rico, 83–77, in the final. El Salvador took third place.
- August 25 – September 3: 2017 FIBA AmeriCup in Bahía Blanca & Córdoba, (Colombia) Medellín, and (Uruguay) Montevideo
  - The United States defeated Argentina, 81–76, to win their seventh FIBA AmeriCup title.
  - Mexico won the bronze medal.

Europe

- June 16 – 25: EuroBasket Women 2017 in the Czech Republic (Prague and Hradec Králové; final round at the O_{2} Arena in Prague)
  - Spain defeated France, 71–55, to win their third EuroBasket Women title.
  - Belgium took third place.
- July 7 – 9: 2017 FIBA 3x3 Europe Cup in Amsterdam
  - Men: Latvia defeated Slovenia, 16–13, in the final. Ukraine took third place.
  - Women: Russia defeated Spain, 22–14, in the final. The Netherlands took third place.
- July 8 – 16: 2017 FIBA U20 Women's European Championship in (Portugal) Matosinhos
  - Spain defeated Slovenia, 73–63, to win their third consecutive and seventh overall FIBA U20 Women's European Championship title.
  - Russia took third place.
- July 15 – 23: 2017 FIBA U20 European Championship in Heraklion, Rethymno, & Chania
  - Greece defeated Israel, 65–56, to win their third FIBA U20 European Championship title.
  - France took third place.
- July 29 – August 6: 2017 FIBA U18 European Championship in (Slovakia) Bratislava & Piešťany
  - Serbia defeated Spain, 74–62, to win their third U18 European Championship title.
  - Lithuania took third place.
- August 4 – 12: 2017 FIBA U16 Women's European Championship in Bourges
  - France defeated Hungary, 63–55, to win their third FIBA U16 Women's European Championship title.
  - Italy took third place.
- August 5 – 13: 2017 FIBA U18 Women's European Championship in (Hungary) Sopron
  - Belgium defeated Serbia, 55–53, to win their second FIBA FIBA U18 Women's European Championship title.
  - France took third place.
- August 11 – 19: 2017 FIBA U16 European Championship in Podgorica
  - France defeated Montenegro, 75–68, to win their third FIBA U16 European Championship title.
  - Serbia took third place.
- August 31 – September 17: EuroBasket 2017 in (Turkey) Istanbul (knockout stages and final), (Romania) Cluj-Napoca, (Finland) Helsinki and (Israel) Tel Aviv
  - Slovenia defeated Serbia, 93–85, to win their first EuroBasket title.
  - Spain took third place.
- September 1 – 3: 2017 FIBA 3x3 Under-18 Europe Cup in Debrecen
  - Men: Belgium defeated the Netherlands, 19–13, in the final. France took third place.
  - Women: Hungary defeated Russia, 12–9, in the final. The Netherlands took third place.

Oceania

- July 10 – 15: 2017 FIBA Under-17 Oceania Championship for Men and Women in Hagåtña, Guam
  - Men: Australia defeated New Zealand, 93–55, to win their fifth consecutive FIBA Under-17 Oceania Championship title.
    - Guam took the bronze medal.
  - Women: Australia defeated New Zealand, 81–60, to win their fifth consecutive FIBA Under-17 Women's Oceania Championship title.
    - Samoa took the bronze medal.

World

- June 17 – 21: 2017 FIBA 3x3 World Cup in Nantes
  - Men: Serbia defeated Netherlands, 21–18, to win their second consecutive and third overall FIBA 3x3 World Cup title.
    - France took the bronze medal.
  - Women: Russia defeated Hungary, 19–12, to win their first Women's FIBA 3x3 World Cup title.
    - Ukraine took the bronze medal.
- June 28 – July 2: 2017 FIBA 3x3 U18 World Cup in (China) Chengdu
  - Men -> Champions: Belgium; Second: Netherlands; Third: Slovenia
  - Women -> Champions: United States; Second: Czech Republic; Third: Russia
- July 1 – 9: 2017 FIBA Under-19 Basketball World Cup in (Egypt) Cairo
  - Canada defeated Italy, 79–60, to win their first FIBA Under-19 Basketball World Cup title.
  - The United States took the bronze medal.
- July 22 – 30: 2017 FIBA Under-19 Women's Basketball World Cup in (Italy) Udine & Cividale del Friuli
  - Russia defeated the United States, 86–82, to win their first FIBA Under-19 Women's Basketball World Cup title.
  - Canada took the bronze medal.

=== 2017 FIBA 3x3 World Tour ===
- July 15 & 16: 3x3 WT #1 in (Canada) Saskatoon
  - (Slovenia) Ljubljana defeated (Canada) Saskatoon, 21–14, in the final.
- July 29 & 30: 3x3 WT #2 in (Japan) Utsunomiya
  - (United Arab Emirates) Novi Sad al-Wahda defeated (Slovenia) Piran, 17–16, in the final.
- August 5 & 6: 3x3 WT #3 in (Czech Republic) Prague
  - (United Arab Emirates) Novi Sad al-Wahda defeated (Slovenia) Ljubljana, 21–11, in the final.
- August 25 & 26: 3x3 WT #4 in (Switzerland) Lausanne
  - (United Arab Emirates) Novi Sad al-Wahda defeated (Switzerland) Lausanne, 20–15, in the final.
- August 31 & September 1: 3x3 WT #5 in (Hungary) Debrecen
  - (Serbia) Liman defeated (Slovenia) Ljubljana, 21–14, in the final.
- September 23 & 24: 3x3 WT #6 in (China) Chengdu
  - (Slovenia) Piran defeated (Serbia) Zemun, 19–18, in the final.
- September 30 & October 1: 3x3 WT #7 in Mexico City
  - (Serbia) Liman defeated fellow Serbian team, Zemun, 21–15, in the final.
- October 28 & 29: 3x3 WT #8 (final) in (China) Beijing
  - (Serbia) Zemun defeated (United Arab Emirates) Novi Sad al-Wahda, 19–17, in the final.

=== National Basketball Association ===
- October 25, 2016 – April 12, 2017: 2016–17 NBA season
  - Top Seed: (California) Golden State Warriors
  - Top Scorer: (California) Russell Westbrook ( Oklahoma City Thunder)
- February 19: 2017 NBA All-Star Game at the Smoothie King Center in (United States) New Orleans
  - The West defeated the East, 192–182.
  - MVP: (Illinois) Anthony Davis ( (Louisiana) New Orleans Pelicans)
  - NBA All-Star Celebrity Game: Team East defeated Team West, 88–59.
  - Rising Stars Challenge: Team World defeated Team USA, 150–141.
  - NBA All-Star Weekend Skills Challenge Winner: (Latvia) Kristaps Porziņģis ( (New York (state)) New York Knicks)
  - Three-Point Contest Winner: (Indiana) Eric Gordon ( (Texas) Houston Rockets)
  - Slam Dunk Contest Winner: Glenn Robinson III ( Indiana Pacers)
- April 15 – June 12: 2017 NBA Playoffs
  - The (California) Golden State Warriors defeated the (Ohio) Cleveland Cavaliers, 4–1 in games played, to win their fifth NBA title.
  - MVP: (Washington, D.C.) Kevin Durant (Golden State Warriors)
- June 22: 2017 NBA draft
  - #1 pick: (Maryland) Markelle Fultz (to the (Pennsylvania) Philadelphia 76ers from the (Washington (state)) Washington Huskies)

=== Women's National Basketball Association ===
- April 13: 2017 WNBA draft in (New York (state)) New York City at the Samsung 837
  - Top pick: (California) Kelsey Plum (to the (Texas) San Antonio Stars from the (Washington (state)) Washington Huskies)
- May 13 – September 3: 2017 WNBA season
  - Western Conference winners: Minnesota Lynx
  - Eastern Conference winners: (New York (state)) New York Liberty
- July 22: 2017 WNBA All-Star Game in (Washington (state)) Seattle
  - The Western Conference defeated the Eastern Conference, 130–121.
  - MVP: (Missouri) Maya Moore ( Minnesota Lynx)
  - Three-Point Shootout winner: (Illinois) Allie Quigley ( (Illinois) Chicago Sky)
- September 6 – October 4: 2017 WNBA Finals
  - The Minnesota Lynx defeated the (California) Los Angeles Sparks, 3–2 in games played, to win their fourth WNBA title.

=== National Collegiate Athletic Association ===
- March 14 – April 3: 2017 NCAA Division I men's basketball tournament (Final Four at University of Phoenix Stadium in Glendale)
  - The North Carolina Tar Heels defeated the (Washington (state)) Gonzaga Bulldogs, 71–65, to win their sixth NCAA Division I men's basketball tournament title.
- March 17 – April 2: 2017 NCAA Division I women's basketball tournament (Final Four at American Airlines Center in Dallas)
  - The South Carolina Gamecocks defeated the Mississippi State Bulldogs, 67–55, to win their first NCAA Division I women's basketball tournament title.

=== Club seasons and championships ===
- September 29, 2016 – April 13: 2016–17 ABA League
  - (Serbia) KK Crvena zvezda defeated (Croatia) KK Cedevita, 3–0 in games played, to win their third consecutive ABA League title.
- September 29, 2016 – April 24: 2016–17 Alpe Adria Cup
  - (Slovakia) MBK Rieker Komárno defeated (Slovenia) KK Domžale, 160–139 on aggregate, to win their first Alpe Adria Cup title.
- October 2, 2016 – June 13, 2017: 2016–17 VTB United League
  - (Russia) CSKA Moscow defeated fellow Russian team, BC Khimki, 3–0 in series played, to win their sixth consecutive and eighth overall VTB United League title.
- October 5, 2016 – March 19: 2016–17 WABA League (Final Four in (Montenegro) Podgorica)
  - (Slovenia) Athlete Celje defeated (Bulgaria) Beroe, 61–57, to win their second WABA League title. (Montenegro) Budućnost Bemax took third place.
- October 10, 2016 – April 20: 2016–17 BIBL
  - (Bulgaria) BC Beroe defeated (North Macedonia) KK Kumanovo, 161–128 on aggregate, to win their first BIBL title.
- October 12, 2016 – May 21: 2016–17 EuroLeague (Final Four at Sinan Erdem Dome in (Turkey) Istanbul)
  - (Turkey) Fenerbahçe defeated (Greece) Olympiacos B.C., 80–64, to win their first EuroLeague title.
  - (Russia) PBC CSKA Moscow took third place.
- October 12, 2016 – April 5: 2016–17 EuroCup Basketball
  - (Spain) Unicaja defeated (Spain) Valencia Basket, 2–1, in the EuroCup Finals to win their first EuroCup title.
- October 18, 2016 – April 26: 2016–17 FIBA Europe Cup (final in (France) Chalon-sur-Saône & Nanterre)
  - (France) Nanterre 92 defeated fellow French team, Élan Chalon, 140–137 on aggregate, to win their first FIBA Europe Cup title.
- October 20, 2016 – April 30: 2016–17 Basketball Champions League (Final Four at the Santiago Martín in (Spain) La Laguna) (debut event)
  - (Spain) Iberostar Tenerife defeated (Turkey) Banvit B.K., 63–59, to win the inaugural Basketball Champions League title.
  - (France) Monaco took third place.
- November 25, 2016 – April 23: 2016–17 ABL season
  - (Hong Kong) Eastern Sports Club (basketball) defeated Singapore Slingers, 3–1 in the finals, to win their first ABL title.
- January 20 – March 18: 2017 FIBA Americas League in (Mexico) Mexicali and Monterrey, (Argentina) Buenos Aires, and (Puerto Rico) Ponce
  - (Venezuela) Guaros de Lara defeated (Argentina) Weber Bahía Basket, 88–65, to win their second consecutive FIBA Americas League title.
  - (Puerto Rico) Leones de Ponce took third place.
- September 24: 2017 FIBA Intercontinental Cup in (Spain) La Laguna
  - (Spain) Iberostar Tenerife defeated (Venezuela) Guaros de Lara, 76–71, to win their first FIBA Intercontinental Cup title.
- November 10 – 19: 2017 FIBA Africa Women's Clubs Champions Cup in (Angola) Luanda
  - (Angola) Primeiro de Agosto defeated (Mozambique) Ferroviário de Maputo, 65–51, to win their third FIBA Africa Women's Clubs Champions Cup title.
  - (Nigeria) First Bank B.C. took third place.
- December 11 – 20: 2017 FIBA Africa Champions Cup in (Tunisia) Radès
  - (Morocco) AS Salé defeated (Tunisia) Étoile Sportive de Radès, 77–69, to win their first FIBA Africa Champions Cup title.
  - (Tunisia) Union Sportive Monastir took third place.

== Bowls ==
=== World events ===
- March 14 – 22: 2017 World Cup in (Australia) Warilla
  - Men's: (Australia) Jeremy Henry defeated (Malaysia) Soufi Rusli 6–5 11–2.
  - Women's: (New Zealand) Jo Edwards defeated (Guernsey) Lucy Beere 8–5 2–9 4–1.
- March 27 – April 2: World Junior Cup in (Australia) Broadbeach
  - Men's: (Wales) Daniel Salmon defeated (Australia) Corey Wedlock, 21–17.
  - Women's: (Canada) Pricilla Westlake defeated (Australia) Ellen Ryan, 21–20.
  - Mixed Pairs: (Malta) Connie Rixon & (Australia) Bill Johnson defeated (Scotland) Claire Walker & (Scotland) John Fleming, 21–17.
- September 23 – 29: 11th European Bowls Team Championships in (Jersey) Les Creux
- October 27 – November 5: World Singles Champion of Champions in (Australia) St Johns Park

=== World Bowls Tour ===
- November 5 – 12, 2016: The Co-op Funeralcare Scottish International Open 2016 in (Scotland) Perth
  - (Scotland) David Gourlay defeated (England) Jamie Chestney, 2–0 (11–9, 10–6)
- January 12 – 27: 2017 World Indoor Bowls Championship in (England) Hopton-on-Sea
  - Men's: (Scotland) Paul Foster defeated (England) Greg Harlow, 2–1 (7–10, 11–1, 2–0).
  - Women's: (England) Katherine Rednall defeated (England) Ellen Falkner, 2–0 (10–5, 10–6).
  - Men's Pairs: (Wales) Jason Greenslade & (England) Les Gillett defeated (Wales) Damian Doubler & (Wales) Daniel Salmon, 1.5–0.5 (7–7, 8–6).
  - Mixed Pairs: (England) Nick Brett & (Scotland) Claire Johnston defeated (Scotland) Paul Foster & (England) Rebecca Field, 2–1 (7–6, 7–9, 2–1).
- March 5 – 10: The Co-op Funeralcare International Open 2017 in (England) Blackpool
  - (England) Jamie Chestney defeated (Scotland) Stewart Anderson, 9,4 – 8,6.
- May 4 – 7: The Co-op Funeralcare European Masters 2017 in (England) Blackpool
  - (England) Danny Denison defeated (England) Simon Skelton, 12–6, 9–7.

=== Other bowls events ===
- January 3 – 8: Team USA Trials 2017 in (United States) Las Vegas
  - Winners: (Arizona) Jakob Butturff (m) / (Nebraska) Erin McCarthy
- November 11 – 18: USA Open in (United States) Sarasota, Florida

== Canadian football ==
- November 26 – 105th Grey Cup: Toronto Argonauts defeat Calgary Stampeders, 27–24.

== Chess ==
=== FIDE Grand Prix 2017 ===
- February 17 – 28: #1 in (United Arab Emirates) Sharjah
  - Winners: (Russia) Alexander Grischuk, (France) Maxime Vachier-Lagrave and (Azerbaijan) Shakhriyar Mamedyarov
- May 11 – 22: #2 in (Russia) Moscow
  - Winner: (China) Ding Liren
- July 5 – 16: #3 in (Switzerland) Geneva
  - Winner: (Azerbaijan) Teimour Radjabov
- November 15 – 26: #4 in (Spain) Palma

=== 2017 Grand Chess Tour ===
- June 19 – 25: Paris Grand Chess Tour in (France) Paris
  - Winner: (Norway) Magnus Carlsen, 2nd place: (France) Maxime Vachier-Lagrave, 3rd place: (United States) Hikaru Nakamura
- June 26 – July 2: Your Next Move Grand Chess Tour in (Belgium) Leuven
  - Blitz winners: (United States) Wesley So, 2nd place: (France) Maxime Vachier-Lagrave, 3rd place: (Norway) Magnus Carlsen
  - Rapid winners: (Norway) Magnus Carlsen, 2nd place: (France) Maxime Vachier-Lagrave & (Netherlands) Anish Giri, 3rd place: (Russia) Vladimir Kramnik & (Armenia) Levon Aronian
  - Combined Score: 1st: (Norway) Magnus Carlsen, 2nd: (United States) Wesley So, 3rd: (France) Maxime Vachier-Lagrave
- July 31 – August 12: Sinquefield Cup in (United States) St. Louis
  - Winner: (France) Maxime Vachier-Lagrave, 2nd place: (Norway) Magnus Carlsen & (India) Viswanathan Anand, 3rd place: (Armenia) Levon Aronian & (Russia) Sergey Karjakin
- August 13 – 20: Saint Louis Rapid & Blitz in (United States) St. Louis
- November 30 – December 11: London Chess Classic (final) in (United Kingdom) London

=== Major ===
- December 28, 2016 – January 5, 2017: Hastings International Chess Congress in (England) Hastings
  - Winner: (India) Deep Sengupta
- January 14 & 15: Paul Keres Memorial Tournament in (Estonia) Tallinn
  - Winner: (Latvia) Igor Kovalenko
- January 23 – February 2: Gibraltar Chess Festival in Gibraltar
  - Winners: (United States) Hikaru Nakamura (m) / (China) Ju Wenjun (f)
- February 21 – March 1: Aeroflot Open in (Russia) Moscow
  - Winner: (Russia) Vladimir Fedoseev
- June 5 – 17: Norway Chess in Stavanger
  - Winner: (Armenia) Levon Aronian, 2nd place: (United States) Hikaru Nakamura, 3rd place: (Russia) Vladimir Kramnik
- August 13 – 23: Abu Dhabi Chess Festival in (United Arab Emirates) Abu Dhabi

=== World events ===
- February 10 – March 5: Women's World Chess Championship 2017 in (Iran) Tehran
  - Winner: (China) Tan Zhongyi
- April 1 – 9: World Amateur Chess Championship in (Italy) Spoleto
  - U2300 Open winner: (Myanmar) Tun Win
  - U2000 winners: (Poland) Maciej Koziej (m) / (Sri Lanka) Zainab Saumy (f)
  - U1700 winners: (England) Hope Mkhumba (m) / (Russia) Vilena Popova (f)
  - Blitz tournament #1 winner: (Russia) Ruslan Pahomov
  - Blitz tournament #2 winner: (Hong Kong) Daniel King-wai Lam
- April 21 – 30: World Schools Chess Championship in (Romania) Iași
  - U7 winners: (Uzbekistan) Khumoyun Begmuratov (m) / (Mongolia) Tselmuun Dorjsuren (f)
  - U9 winners: (Mongolia) Erdenebat Azjargal (m) / (Uzbekistan) Afruza Khamdamova (f)
  - U11 winners: (Turkey) Efe Hakan Öztürk (m) / (Poland) Martyna Starosta (f)
  - U13 winners: (Turkey) Enes Tanrıverdi (m) / (Kazakhstan) Nazerke Nurgali (f)
  - U15 winners: (Uzbekistan) Nodirbek Yakubboev (m) / (Kazakhstan) Assel Serikbay (f)
  - U17 winners: (Moldova) Andrei Macovei (m) / (Republic of Ireland) Diana Mîrza (f)
- April 24 – May 4: World Team Chess Championship 50+, 65+ in (Greece) Crete
  - +50 winners: 1st: (Russia) Saint Petersburg, 2nd: Armenia, 3rd: England I
  - +65 winners: 1st: Russia, 2nd: France, 3rd: Sweden I
- June 1 – 5: 1st FIDE World Cadets Rapid & Blitz Chess Championships 2017 in (Belarus) Minsk
  - Rapid U8 winners: (Vietnam) Phạm Trần Gia Phúc (m) / (Russia) Sofia Mutina (f)
  - Blitz U8 winners: (Belarus) Andrei Rudnev (m) / (Russia) Anna Shukhman (f)
  - Rapid U10 winners: (Belarus) Mikhei Navumenka (m) / (Russia) Veronika Shubenkova (f)
  - Blitz U10 winners: (Uzbekistan) Islombek Sindarov (m) / (Russia) Veronika Shubenkova (f)
  - Rapid U12 winners: (Russia) Volodar Murzin (m) / (Ukraine) Anastasiia Dubovyk (f)
  - Blitz U12 winners: (Belarus) Denis Lazavik (m) / (Belarus) Kseniya Zeliantsova (f)
- June 17 – 26: World Team Chess Championship in Khanty-Mansiysk
  - Winners: China (Ding Liren, Yu Yangyi, Wei Yi, Li Chao, Wen Yang (m) / Russia (Alexandra Kosteniuk, Kateryna Lagno, Valentina Gunina, Aleksandra Goryachkina, Olga Girya)
- June 22 – 29: 1st FIDE World Junior Chess Championship for the Disabled in (United States) Orlando
  - Winner: (Germany) Raphael Johannes Zimmer, 2nd place: (India) Samarth Jagadish Rao, 3rd place: (United States) Griffin McConnell
- August 21 – 31: World Cadet Chess Championship in (Brazil) Brasília
- September 1 – 25: Chess World Cup 2017 in (Georgia (country)) Batumi and Tbilisi
- September 16 – 26: World Youth Chess Championship (U-14, 16, 18) in (Uruguay) Montevideo
- October 1 – 16: World Junior Chess Championship in (Italy) Tarvisio
- November 6 – 19: World Senior Chess Championship in (Italy) Acqui Terme
- TBD: World Youth U-16 Chess Olympiad 2017 in (India) Ahmedabad

=== European events ===
- April 10 – 23: 2017 Women's European Individual Chess Championship in (Latvia) Riga
  - Winner: (Georgia (country)) Nana Dzagnidze
  - Note: Nana Dzagnidze, (Russia) Kateryna Lagno, (Ukraine) Mariya Muzychuk, (Poland) Monika Soćko, (Armenia) Elina Danielian, (Germany) Elisabeth Pähtz, (Russia) Marina Nechaeva, (Georgia (country)) Bela Khotenashvili, (Ukraine) Natalia Zhukova, (Russia) Natalia Pogonina, (Hungary) Hoang Thanh Trang and (Hungary) Anita Gara qualified for Chess World Cup.
- May 29 – June 10: European Individual Chess Championship in (Belarus) Minsk
  - Winner: (Russia) Maxim Matlakov
  - Note: Maxim Matlakov, (Georgia (country)) Baadur Jobava, (Russia) Vladimir Fedoseev, (Germany) Daniel Fridman, (Bulgaria) Ivan Cheparinov, (Russia) Alexander Motylev, (Poland) Jan-Krzysztof Duda, (Czech Republic) David Navara, (England) David Howell, (Ukraine) Martyn Kravtsiv, (Ukraine) Alexander Areshchenko, and (Germany) Matthias Blübaum qualified for Chess World Cup.
- June 9 – 17: European Amateur Chess Championship 2017 in (Serbia) Niš
  - Elo 2000–2299 winner: (Turkey) Diyap Buyukasik
  - Elo 1700–1999 winner: (Turkey) Doruk Karaoğlan
  - Elo 0–1699 winner: (Serbia) Pavle Ćirić
- June 10 – 20: European Schools Championship 2017 in (Montenegro) Budva
  - U7 winners: (Russia) Timur Yonal (m) / (Belarus) Ekaterina Zubkovskaya (f)
  - U9 winners: (Turkey) Kerem Erten (m) / (Turkey) Elif Zeren Yıldız (f)
  - U11 winners: (Turkey) Zeki Berke Çaputçuoğlu (m) / (Russia) Evita Cherepanova (f)
  - U13 winners: (Russia) Maksim Zhukov (m) / (Turkey) Esma Doğa Duran (f)
  - U15 winners: (Georgia (country)) Nikoloz Petriashvili (m) / (Israel) Michelle Katkov (f)
  - U17 winners: (Russia) Timur Trubchaninov (m) / (Turkey) Bengu Sena Ayan (f)
- June 19 – 23: European Youth Rapid and Blitz Championship 2017 in (Montenegro) Budva
  - Rapid U8 winners: (Russia) Savely Morozov (m) / (Belarus) Ekaterina Zubkovskaya (f)
  - Rapid U10 winners: (Russia) Daniil Maneluk (m) / (Russia) Galina Mikheeva (f)
  - Rapid U12 winners: (Belgium) Daniel Dardha (m) / (Russia) Evita Cherepanova (f)
  - Rapid U14 winners: (Slovenia) Jan Šubelj (m) / (Russia) Ksenia Strukova (f)
  - Rapid U16 winners: (Belarus) Viachaslau Zarubitski (m) / Viktoria Radeva (f)
  - Rapid U18 winners: (Austria) Florian Mesaros (m) / (Slovenia) Ivana Hrescak (f)
  - Blitz U10 winners: (Russia) Daniil Maneluk (m) / (Russia) Evelina Zavivaeva (f)
  - Blitz U14 winners: (Slovenia) Jan Šubelj (m) / (Albania) Klean Shuqja (f)
  - Blitz U18 winners: (Austria) Florian Mesaros (m) / (Belarus) Olga Badelka (f)
- June 24 – July 4: European Team Chess Championship for seniors in Novi Sad
  - +50 winners: Serbia (Miloš Pavlović, Goran Todorović, Siniša Dražić, Zoran Arsovic, Nenad Ristić)
  - +65 winners: Russia (Evgeny Sveshnikov, Yuri Balashov, Evgeni Vasiukov, Vladimir Zhelnin, Nikolai Pushkov)
- August 11 – 21: European Senior Chess Championship in (Spain) Barcelona
- August 16 – 24: European Youth Team Chess Championship 2017 in (Poland) Iwonicz-Zdrój
- August 18 – 27: EU Youth Chess Championship U8-14 in (Czech Republic) Kouty nad Desnou
- September 3 – 14: European Youth Chess Championship in (Romania) Mamaia
- September 18 – 22: European Universities Chess Championship 2017 in (Spain) Fuengirola
- October 2 – 10: European Chess Club Cup for men and women in (Turkey) Manavgat
- October 15 – 20: European Youth Rapid and Blitz Championship 2017 in (Montenegro) Budva
- October 20 – 24: European Women's Rapid & Blitz Championship 2017 in Monaco
- October 25 – November 5: European Team Chess Championship in (Greece) Halkidiki
- November 11 – 19: 5th European Small Nations Team Chess Championship 2017 in Andorra
- November 24 & 25: 1st European Corporate Chess Championship 2017 in (France) Paris
- December 14 – 18: European Rapid and Blitz Championship 2017 in (Poland) Katowice

=== 2017–18 European Youth Grand Prix ===
- May 17 – 29, 2017: European Youth Grand Prix #1 in (Russia) Kirishi
  - Winners: 1st: (Russia) Kirill Shubin, 2nd: (Russia) Sergei Lobanov, 3rd: (Armenia) Aram Hakobyan
- TBD from October, 2017: European Youth Grand Prix #2 in (Armenia) Jermuk
- TBD from May, 2018: European Youth Grand Prix #3 in (Russia) Kirishi

=== African Events ===
- July 1 – 13: African Chess Championship (individual, rapid, blitz) in (Algeria) Oran
  - Winners: (Egypt) Bassem Amin (m) / (Egypt) Shahenda Wafa (f)
  - Blitz winners: (Egypt) Ahmed Adly (m) / (Egypt) Shrook Wafa (f)
  - Rapid winners: (Egypt) Bassem Amin (m) / (Egypt) Shahenda Wafa (f)
- July 23 – August 1: African Club Chess Championships in (Egypt) Cairo
  - Winner Club: (Egypt) Al Hawar Chess Club
- August 5 – 13: African Women's Chess Challenge in (Botswana) Gaborone
- August 19 – 27: African Schools Individual Chess Championships in (Namibia) Windhoek
- October 7 – 15: African Amateur Individual Chess Championships in (Tanzania) Dar es Salaam
- November 11 – 19: African Team Chess Championships in (Tunisia) Tunis
- December 1 – 10: African Youth Chess Championships in (Egypt) Giza
- December 28, 2017 – January 8, 2018: African Junior Chess Championships 2017 in (Togo) Lomé

=== African Zonals ===
- March 25 – April 3: Zone 4.2 Individual Championships in (Ethiopia) Jimma
  - Winners: (Egypt) Essam El-Gindy (m) / (Egypt) Shahenda Wafa (f)
- April 1 – 10: Zone 4.1 Individual Championships in (Algeria) Algiers
  - Winners: (Algeria) Mohamed Haddouche (m) / (Algeria) Amina Mezioud (f)
- April 20 – 30: Zone 4.4 Individual Championships in (Liberia) Monrovia (men's only)
  - Winner: (Nigeria) Oluwafemi Balogun
- June 9 – 18: Zone 4.3 Individual Championships in (Zambia) Livingstone
  - Winners: (South Africa) Kenny Solomon (m) / (South Africa) Aleida De Bruyn (f)

=== American Events ===
- April 13 – 18: 2017 CARIFTA Games in (Jamaica) Kingston
  - U12 winners: (Jamaica) David Thomas (m) / (Jamaica) Johmoi Blake (f)
  - U16 winners: (Trinidad and Tobago) Alan-Safar Ramoutar (m) / (Jamaica) Adani Clarke (f)
  - U20 winners: (Barbados) Orlando Husbands (m) / (Jamaica) Sheanel Gardner (f)
- April 25 – 30: 2017 South American Junior U20 Championship in (Ecuador) Manta
  - Winners: (Peru) José Eduardo Martínez Alcántara (m) / (Ecuador) Anahí Ortiz Verdesoto (f)
- June 9 – 19: Pan American Chess Championship in (Colombia) Medellín
  - Winner: (United States) Samuel Sevian
  - Note: Samuel Sevian, (Peru) Jorge Cori, (Paraguay) Neuris Delgado Ramírez, (Paraguay) Axel Bachmann, (Peru) Emilio Córdova Daza, (Cuba) Lazaro Bruzon qualified for Chess World Cup 2017.
- June 21 – 28: Central American & Caribbean Junior U20 Chess Championships 2017 in Barbados
  - (Barbados) Dondre Husbands
- June 30 – July 7: Panamerican Youth Championship 2017 in Costa Rica
  - U8 winners: (Colombia) Santiago Lopez Rayo (b) / (United States) Omya Vidyarthi (f)
  - Blitz U8 winner: (Colombia) Santiago Lopez Rayo (b) / (United States) Omya Vidyarthi (f)
  - U10 winners: (United States) Eric Li (b) / (Peru) Fiorella Contreras (f)
  - Blitz U10 winners: (Colombia) Manuel Campos Gomez (b) / (Peru) Fiorella Contreras (f)
  - U12 winners: (United States) Nico Chasin (b) / (Venezuela) Vicmary C. Perez Hernandez (f)
  - Blitz U12 winners: (Peru) Diego Saul Rod Flores Quillas (b) / (United States) Nastassja A Matus (f)
  - U14 winners: (United States) Aristo S. Liu (b) / (Canada) Emma He (f)
  - Blitz U14 winners: (Colombia) Miguel Angel Soto (b) / / (United States) Aasa Dommalapati (f)
  - U16 winners: (Argentina) Francisco Varacalli (b) / (Chile) Javiera Belen Gomez Barrera (f)
  - Blitz U16 winners: (Venezuela) Mauricio Ramirez Gonzalez (b) / (Peru) Aleyla Hilario (f)
  - U18 winners: (Canada) Michael Song (b) / (Peru) Trilce Cosme Contreras (f)
  - Blitz U18 winners: (Colombia) Jose Gabriel Cardoso Cardoso (b) / (Colombia) Valentina Argote Heredia (f)
- July 12 – 17: North American Youth Championship 2017 in (United States) Morristown, New Jersey
  - U8 winners: (United States) Kevin Duong (b) / (United States) Iris Mou (f)
  - U10 winners: (United States) Liran Zhou (b) / (United States) Stephanie Velea (f)
  - U12 winners: (United States) Maximillian Lu (b) / (United States) Annapoorni Meiyappan (f)
  - U14 winners: (Canada) Qiuyu Huang (b) / (United States) Ellen Wang (f)
  - U16 winners: (United States) Christopher Yoo (b) / (United States) Queena Deng (f)
  - U18 winners: (United States) Bryce Tiglon (b) / (United States) Vicki Yang (f)
- August 9 – 15: Central American & Caribbean Youth Chess Championships 2017 in Panama
  - Men's U8 winner: (Venezuela) Sebastían Mérida Ceballos
  - U10 winners: (Cuba) Yaset Jose Cruz Santos (m) / (Panama) Ania Nahid Rosales Espinoza (f)
  - U12 winners: (Cuba) Jean Marco Cruz Mendez (m) / (Colombia) Andrea Albor Rebolledo (f)
  - U14 winners: (Cuba) Jerzy Jesus Perez Leiva (m) / (Cuba) Penelope Gonzalez Diaz (f)
  - U16 winners: (Cuba) Raynner Amaro Alfonso (m) / (Cuba) Roxangel Obregón García (f)
  - U18 winners: (Cuba) Luis Ernesto Quesada Pérez (m) / (Cuba) Chrissye L Gonzalez Estrada (f)
- August 30 – September 4: North American Junior U20 Championship 2017 in (United States) Dallas
- October 11 – 16: Panamerican Senior Chess Championship 2017 in Colombia
- October 31 – November 7: Panamerican Junior U20 Chess Championship 2017 in (El Salvador) San Salvador
- December 1 – 7: South American Youth Championship 2017 in Paraguay
- December 11 – 18: 2017 Panamerican Schools Chess Championship 2017 in (El Salvador) San Salvador
- TBD: Panamerican Amateur Chess Championship 2017 in Ecuador
- TBD: Women's Continental Championship 2017 in Argentina
- TBD: Panamerican University Championship 2017 in (Mexico) Durango
- TBD: Panamerican Teams Championship in TBD location

==== American Zonals ====
- March 27 – April 11: American Zonal 2.1 Open & Women in (United States) St. Louis
  - Winners: (United States) Wesley So (m) / (United States) Sabina-Francesca Foisor (f)
- April 26 – May 1: American Zonal 2.4 in (Brazil) Florianópolis (men's only)
  - Winner: (Peru) Jorge Cori
- April 30 – May 8: American Zonal 2.5 Open in (Argentina) Buenos Aires (men's only)
- Winner: (Argentina) Sandro Mareco
- May 26 – 31: American Zonal 2.3 in (El Salvador) San Salvador (men's only)
  - Winners: (Colombia) Joshua Ruiz and (Cuba) Yuri Gonzalez Vidal
- TBD: American Zonal 2.5 Women in Chile, Paraguay or Uruguay

=== Asian Events ===
- March 31 – April 9: Asian Youth Chess Championship in (Uzbekistan) Tashkent
  - U8 winners: (Vietnam) Trần Gia Phúc Phạm (b) / (Uzbekistan) Afruza Khamdamova (f)
  - Blitz U8 winners: (India) Ilamparthi A. R. (b) / (China) Yining Chen (f)
  - Rapid U8 winners: (India) Ilamparthi A. R. (b) / (China) Yining Chen (f)
  - U10 winners: (Iran) Artin Ashraf (b) / (India) Sahithi Varshini M (f)
  - Blitz U10 winners: (Uzbekistan) Islombek Sindarov (b) / (India) Sahithi Varshini M (f)
  - Rapid U10 winners: (Iran) Artin Ashraf (b) / (China) Yaqing Wei (f)
  - U12 winners: (Uzbekistan) Javokhir Sindarov (b) / (Kazakhstan) Meruert Kamalidenova (f)
  - Blitz U12 winners: (Uzbekistan) Javokhir Sindarov (b) / (India) Divya Deshmukh (f)
  - Rapid U12 winners: (Vietnam) Nguyễn Quốc Hy (b) / (Kazakhstan) Meruert Kamalidenova (f)
  - U14 winners: (India) Arjun Erigaisi (b) / (India) Jishitha D (f)
  - Blitz U14 winners: (Iran) Arash Daghli (b) / / (India) Jishitha D (f)
  - Rapid U14 winners: (India) Arjun Erigaisi (b) / (Iran) Motahare Asadi (f)
  - U16 winners: (Uzbekistan) Nodirbek Yakubboev (b) / (Kazakhstan) Assel Serikbay (f)
  - Blitz U16 winners: (Iran) Mahdi Gholami Orimi (b) / (Kazakhstan) Assel Serikbay (f)
  - Rapid U16 winners: (Uzbekistan) Shamsiddin Vokhidov (b) / (Kazakhstan) Assel Serikbay (f)
  - U18 winners: (Iran) Arash Tahbaz (b) / (India) Aakanksha Hagawane (f)
  - Blitz U18 winners: (Iran) Arash Tahbaz (b) / (India) Aakanksha Hagawane (f)
  - Rapid U18 winners: (Uzbekistan) Ortik Nigmatov (b) / (Uzbekistan) Gulrukhbegim Tokhirjonova (f)
- May 1 – 10: Asian Juniors and Girls U20 Championships in (Iran) Shiraz
  - Winners: (Iran) Masoud Mosadeghpour (m) / (India) Ivana Maria Furtado (f)
  - Blitz winners: (Vietnam) Trần Tuấn Minh (m) / (Iran) Mobina Alinasab (f)
  - Rapid winners: (Vietnam) Trần Tuấn Minh (m) / (India) Isha Sharma (f)
- May 11 – 12: Asian Chess Championship (individual and blitz) in (China) Chengdu
  - Winners: (China) Wang Hao (m) / (Vietnam) Võ Thị Kim Phụng (f)
  - Blitz winners: (India) R. Vaishali (m) / (China) Wei Yi (f)
- June 2 – 10: 1st Asian Championship for Disabled in (Kyrgyzstan) Bishkek
- June 17 – 26: Eastern Asia Youth Chess Championship 2017 in Ulanbaatar
  - Mongolia won the gold medal tally and the overall medal tally.
- July 20 – 30: Asian Schools Chess Championship (individual, rapid and blitz) in Panjin
  - Open & girls overall winners: China
- August 1 – 7: Western Asia Youth Chess Championship 2017 in Sri Lanka
- August 1 – 8: Asian Club Cup Championship 2017 in Sri Lanka
  - Winners: (Iran) Saipa Chess Club, 2nd: (Bangladesh) Saif Sporting Chess Club, 3rd place: (Australia) Sydney Chess Club
- October 9 – 15: Asian Senior Chess Championship in (New Zealand) Auckland

==== Asian Zonals ====
- January 14 – 20: Asian Zonal 3.6 in (New Zealand) Auckland
  - Winners: (Australia) Anton Smirnov (m) / (New Zealand) Layla Timergazi (f)
- February 24 – March 6: Asian Zonal 3.3 in (Philippines) Tagaytay
  - Winners: (Malaysia) Li Tian Yeoh (m) / (Vietnam) Võ Thị Kim Phụng (f)
- March 18 – 25: Asian Zonal 3.2 in (Nepal) Pokhara
  - Winners: (Bangladesh) Abdullah Al Rakib (m) / (Bangladesh) Rani Hamid (f)
- June 15 – 25: Asian Zonal 3.4 in (Uzbekistan) Tashkent
  - Winners: (Uzbekistan) Jahongir Vakhidov (m) / (Kazakhstan) Dinara Saduakassova (f)

== Cricket ==
=== Major leagues and cups ===
- October 6, 2016 – January 14: (India) 2016–17 Ranji Trophy
  - Gujarat defeated Mumbai, 328–228.
  - Gujarat won by 5 wickets.
- October 25, 2016 – March 29: 2016–17 Sheffield Shield season
  - Victoria led first-innings over South Australia, 487–287.
  - Match drawn; Victoria won the competition with first-innings lead.
- February 17 – April 2: (South Africa) 2016–17 Momentum One Day Cup
  - Titans defeated Warriors, 425/5–189.
  - Titans won by 236 runs.
- April 5 – May 21: (India) 2017 Indian Premier League
  - Mumbai Indians defeated Rising Pune Supergiant, 129/8–128/6.
  - Mumbai Indians won by 1 run.
- April 7 – September 28: (England) / (Wales) 2017 County Championship
  - Essex won league.
- September 27 – October 21: 2017-18 JLT One-Day Cup
  - Western Australia defeated South Australia, 4/250–9/248
  - Western Australia won by 6 wickets.

=== International cricket competitions ===
- November 11, 2016 – April 18: 2016–17 Regional Four Day Competition
  - Guyana won round-robin.
- January 24 – February 18: 2016–17 Regional Super50 in Antigua and Barbuda
  - Barbados Tridents defeated Jamaica Tallawahs, 271–212.
  - Barbados Tridents won by 59 runs.
- May 12 – 24: 2017 Ireland Tri-Nation Series in Ireland
  - New Zealand won round robin.
- May 21 – 31: 2017 ICC World Cricket League Division Three in Uganda
  - Oman and Canada promoted.
  - No result in final.
- June 1 – 18: 2017 ICC Champions Trophy in England and Wales
  - Pakistan defeated India, 338/4–158.
  - Pakistan won by 180 runs.
- June 26 – July 23: 2017 Women's Cricket World Cup in England
  - England defeated India 228/7– 219.
  - England Women won by 9 runs.
- December 2017 (final round): 2015–17 ICC Intercontinental Cup
- December 2017 (final round): 2015–17 ICC World Cricket League Championship

=== 2017–18 Ashes series ===
- November 23 – 27: 1st Test at (Australia) The Gabba, Brisbane
- December 2 – 6: 2nd Test at (Australia) Adelaide Oval, Adelaide
- December 14 – 18: 3rd Test at (Australia) WACA Ground, Perth
- December 26 – 30: 4th Test at (Australia) Melbourne Cricket Ground, Melbourne
- January 4 – 8, 2018: 5th Test at (Australia) Sydney Cricket Ground, Sydney

== Cue sports ==
=== WPA ===
==== World 8 Ball Series ====
- January 14 – 17: Molinari Players' Championship & Cheqio Challenge Championship in (United States) New York City
  - Winner: (Russia) Ruslan Chinakhov
  - Challenge winner: (Spain) Francisco Sánchez Ruiz
- April 4 – 7: Aramith Masters Championship & Kamui Challenge Championship in (United States) New York City
  - Winner: (Albania) Eklent Kaçi
  - Challenge winner: (Philippines) Lee Vann Corteza
- July 12 – 15: Ryo Rack Classic Championship & Simonis Challenge Championship in (United States) New York City
  - Winner: (United States) Skyler Woodward
  - Challenge winner: (Finland) Mika Immonen
- September 27 – October 1: Predator World Series Championship & Highrock Challenge Championship in

==== Events ====
- January 10 – 15: 2017 Joy Billiards World Chinese 8 Ball Masters in (China) Qinhuangdao
  - Winner: (United Kingdom) Gareth Potts
- January 31 – February 5: IPA World Professional Pool Championships in (England) Bradford
  - Winners: (Wales) Craig Marsh (m) / (Wales) Collette Henrikson (f)
- February 17 – 19: World Pool Masters in Gibraltar
  - (Spain) David Alcaide defeated (Scotland) Jayson Shaw, 8–7, in the final.
- February 26 – March 5: Amway eSpring International Women 9-Ball Championship in (Chinese Taipei) Taipei
  - Winner: (China) Siming CHEN
- March 13 – 16: Chinese 8-Ball World Championship 2017 in (China) Yushan
  - Winners: (China) Yang Fan (m) / (China) Xiao Fang Fu (f)
- March 18 – 28: European Pool Championships in (Portugal) Vale do Lobo
  - (Netherlands) Niels Feijen defeated (Poland) Tomasz Kapłan, 125–13. (Finland) Kim Laaksonen and (Poland) Mieszko Fortuński take third and fourth places.
- July 31 – August 7: Youth European Championships in (Netherlands) Heeze-Leende
  - 8 balls winners: (Russia) Fedor Gorst (m) / (Russia) Kristina Tkach (f)
  - 9 balls winners: (Netherlands) Jan van Lierop (m) / (Russia) Kristina Tkach (f)
  - 10 balls winners: (Germany) Patrick Hofmann (m) / (Russia) Kristina Tkach (f)
  - Juniors Straight winner: (Germany) Kevin Schiller
  - Teams winners: Germany (Patrick Hofmann, Leon Kohl, Kevin Schiller)
- August 14 – 21: European Championships (Seniors & Ladies) in (Netherlands) Heeze-Leende
  - 8 balls winners: (Portugal) Henrique Correia (m) / (Germany) Susanne Wessel (f)
  - 9 balls winners: (Portugal) Henrique Correia (m) / (Norway) Ine Helvik (f)
  - 10 balls winners: (Norway) Vegar Kristiansen (m) / (Norway) Ine Helvik (f)
  - Straight Seniors winner: (Netherlands) Jesse Thehu
  - Teams winners: Norway (m) / Germany (f)
- August 23 – 26: Dynamic European Championships (U23) in (Netherlands) Heeze-Leende
  - 8 balls winner: (Germany) Joshua Filler
  - 9 balls winner: (Germany) Joshua Filler
- August 17 – 20: 9-Ball World Championship (Wheelchair) in (Finland) Tampere
  - Winners: (Illinois) 5th Street Players, 2nd place: (California) The Contenders II, 3rd place: (Illinois) Here We Go Again & (Ontario) 9-Ball Bombers
- October 30, 2017 – 2 November 2017: 2017 WPA World Nine-ball Junior Championship
  - Winners: Sanjin Pehlivanovic (U17), Fedor Gorst (boys), Kristina Tkatsch (girls)
- December 4 – 7: 2017 Mosconi Cup in (United States) Las Vegas
  - Winner: Europe

==== Euro Tour ====
- February 23 – 26: 2017 Italian Open in (Italy) Treviso
  - Winners: (Germany) Ralf Souquet (m) / (Germany) Ina Kaplan (f)
- March 30 – April 1: 2017 Portugal Open in Albufeira
  - Winners: (Netherlands) Nick van den Berg (m) / (Austria) Jasmin Ouschan (f)
- May 18 – 21: 2017 Austrian Open in (Austria) St. Johann im Pongau
  - Winners: (Austria) Mario He (m) / (Austria) Jasmin Ouschan (f)
- August 10 – 13: 2017 Dutch Open in (Netherlands) Heeze-Leende
  - Winners: (Russia) Ruslan Chinakhov (m) / (Belarus) Marharyta Fefilava (f)
- October 5 – 8: 2017 Klagenfurt Open in (Austria) Klagenfurt
  - Winners: (Germany) Ralf Souquet (m) / (China) Siming Chen (f)
- November 16 – 18: 2017 Treviso Open in (Italy) Treviso
  - Winner: (Poland) Wiktor Zielinski (m)
- November 18 – 19: Women 9-Ball Open in (Portugal) Braga
  - Winner: (Belarus) Marharyta Fefilava (f)

=== UMB ===
- March 4: World Super Cup in (Belgium) Antwerp
  - Winner: (Spain) Daniel Sánchez
- March 9 – 12: World Championship for National Teams in (Germany) Viersen
  - Winners: South Korea (Sung Won Choi & Jae Guen Kim)
- April 7 – 9: Coupe d'Europe Classic Teams (final) in (Czech Republic) Prague
  - Winners: (Germany) Bochum (Sam van Etten, Thomas Nockemann, Ludger Havlik)
- April 28 – May 7: 2017 CEB European Three-cushion Championship in (Germany) Brandenburg an der Havel
  - Winners: Belgium, Second place: Italy, Third place: France
- May 10 & 11: Billiard Charity Challenge in (Belgium) Halle and Zoersel
- May 12 – 14: UMB World Three-cushion Championship for women in (Belgium) Halle and Zoersel
  - Winner: (Japan) Orie Hida, Second place: (South Korea) Mi Rae Lee, Third place: (Turkey) Gülşen Degener
- June 8 – 11: Coupe d´Europe Three Cushion Club (final) in (Portugal) Porto
  - Winners: (Portugal) FC Porto (Dani Sánchez, Torbjörn Blomdahl, Manuel Rui Costa, João Pedro Ferreira)
- June 16 – 18: European Ladies Cup Three Cushion in Netherlands
  - Winners: (Netherlands) Therese Klompenhouwer, Free Game winner: (Belgium) Karolien Matthys
- September 15 – 17: World Championship 3 Cushion Juniors in (Spain) Los Alcázares
- October 7 – 14: World Championship Five-pin in (Argentina) Necochea
- November 8 – 12: UMB World Three-cushion Championship in (Bolivia) Santa Cruz
- November 17 – 19: Lausanne Billiard Masters in Switzerland

==== Three-Cushion World Cup ====
- February 6 – 12: World Cup #1 in (Turkey) Bursa
  - Winner: (Belgium) Frédéric Caudron
- March 26 – April 1: World Cup #2 in (Egypt) Luxor
  - Winner: (Spain) Daniel Sánchez
- May 22 – 28: World Cup #3 in (Vietnam) Ho Chi Minh City
  - Winner: (Belgium) Eddy Merckx
- September 3 – 9: World Cup #4 in (Portugal) Porto
- December 3 – 9: World Cup #5 in (Egypt) Hurghada

== Dancesport ==
=== WDSF Super Grand Prix ===
- March 12: #1 (Japan) Super Grand Prix (PD) Tokyo
  - Winners: (Italy) Benedetto Ferruggia & Claudia Köhler
  - 2nd place: (Lithuania) Donatas Vėželis & Lina Chatkevičiūtė
  - 3rd place: (Italy) Marco Camarlinghi & Martina Minasi
- April 15 & 16: #2 (Spain) Super Grand Prix Cambrils
  - Latin winners: (Germany) Pavel Pasechnik & Marta Arndt
  - Standard winners: (Italy) Benedetto Ferruggia & Claudia Köhler
- August 8 – 10: #3 (Germany) Super Grand Prix (PD) Stuttgart
  - Latin winners: (Latvia) Marts Smolko & Tina Bazykina
- September 30: #4 (Czech Republic) Super Grand Prix Ostrava
- December 3: #5 (Russia) WDSF PD Super Grand Prix Moscow

=== WDSF World Cup ===
- March 4: WDSF PD World Cup in (Ukraine) Kharkiv (Standard only)
  - Winners: (Italy) Benedetto Ferruggia & Claudia Köhler
  - Second place: (Lithuania) Donatas Vėželis & Lina Chatkevičiūtė
  - Third place: (Italy) Marco Cavallaro & Letizia Ingrosso
- June 3: WDSF World Cup in (Hungary) Szombathely (Latin only)
  - 1st place: (Hungary) Andrea Silvestri & Martina Váradi
  - Second place: (Russia) Timur Yusupov & Sofia Kharina
  - Third place: (Italy) Giacomo Lazzarini & Roberta Benedetti
- June 24: WDSF PD World Cup in (Germany) Baden-Baden (Latin only)
  - 1st place: (Latvia) Marts Smolko & Tina Bazykina
  - Second place: (Italy) Daniele Sargenti & Uliana Fomenko
  - Third place: (China) Wang Jun & Jia Yiwen
- August 26: WDSF World Cup (Standard) in (Malaysia) Johor Bahru
  - Winners: (Italy) Francesco Galuppo & Debora Pacini
  - Second place: (Austria) Vasily Kirin & Ekaterina Prozorova
  - Third place: (Russia) Evgeny Nikitin & Anastasia Miliutina
- December 9: WDSF World Cup in (Israel) Ashdod

=== WDSF GrandSlam ===
- March 18 & 19: #1 (Finland) GrandSlam Helsinki
  - Adult Standard winners: (Russia) Dmitry Zharkov & Olga Kulikova
  - Adult Latin winners: (Moldova) Gabriele Goffredo & Anna Matus
- April 8 & 9: #2 (China) GrandSlam Wuhan
  - Adult Standard winners: (Russia) Dmitry Zharkov & Olga Kulikova
  - Adult Latin winners: (Moldova) Gabriele Goffredo & Anna Matus
- July 8 & 9: #3 GrandSlam Hong Kong
  - Adult Standard winners: (Russia) Dmitry Zharkov & Olga Kulikova
  - Adult Latin winners: (Moldova) Gabriele Goffredo & Anna Matus
- August 10 – 12: #4 (Germany) GrandSlam Stuttgart
  - Adult Standard winners: (Russia) Dmitry Zharkov & Olga Kulikova
  - Adult Latin winners: (Moldova) Gabriele Goffredo & Anna Matus
- October 27 & 28: #5 (Russia) GrandSlam Moscow
- December 9 & 10: #6 (final) (China) GrandSlam Shanghai

=== WDSF World Open ===
- January 7 & 8: #1 (Spain) World Open Madrid
  - World Open Standard Adult winners: (Lithuania) Evaldas Sodeika & (Lithuania) Ieva Žukauskaitė
  - World Open Latin Adult winners: (Germany) Marius-Andrei Bălan & (Germany) Khrystyna Moshenska
- January 28: #2 (Germany) World Open Pforzheim
  - World Open Latin Adult winners: (Germany) Marius-Andrei Bălan & (Germany) Khrystyna Moshenska
- February 11 & 12: #3 (Belgium) World Open Antwerp
  - World Open Standard Adult winners: (Russia) Dmitry Zharkov & (Russia) Olga Kulikova
  - World Open Latin Adult winners: (Russia) Anton Aldaev & (Russia) Natalia Polukhina
- February 17 & 18: #4 (Denmark) World Open Copenhagen
  - World Open Standard Adult winners: (Germany) Anton Skuratov & Alona Uehlin
  - World Open Latin Adult winners: (Spain) Guillem Pascual and Rosa Carné
- February 25 & 26: #5 (Russia) World Open Moscow
  - World Open Standard Adult winners: (Russia) Evgeny Nikitin & Anastasia Miliutina
  - World Open Latin Adult winners: (Russia) Armen Tsaturyan & Svetlana Gudyno
- March 11 & 12: #6 (Romania) World Open Bucharest
  - World Open Standard Adult winners: (Estonia) Madis Abel & Aleksandra Galkina
  - World Open Latin Adult winners: (Russia) Armen Tsaturyan & Svetlana Gudyno
- March 12: #7 (Japan) World Open Tokyo
  - World Open Standard Adult winners: (Philippines) Sean Aranar & Ana Nualla
  - World Open Latin Adult winners: (South Korea) Lim Tan Hong & Choi Ju Young
- March 25 & 26: #8 (Belarus) World Open Minsk
  - World Open Standard Adult winners: (Russia) Alexey Glukhov & Anastasia Glazunova
  - World Open Latin Adult winners: (Germany) Timur Imametdinov & Nina Bezzubova
- March 25 & 26: #9 (Italy) World Open Pieve di Cento
  - World Open Standard Adult winners: (Russia) Dmitry Zharkov & (Russia) Olga Kulikova
  - World Open Latin Adult winners: (Moldova) Gabriele Goffredo & Anna Matus
- April 2: #10 (Czech Republic) World Open Brno
  - World Open Standard Adult winners: (Denmark) Bjørn Bitsch & Ashli Williamson
- April 22 & 23: #11 (Ukraine) World Open Uzhhorod
  - World Open Standard Adult winners: (Germany) Dumitru Doga & Sarah Ertmer
  - World Open Latin Adult winners: (Czech Republic) Marek Bures & Anastasiia Iermolenko
- May 13: #12 (Bulgaria) World Open Varna
  - World Open Latin Adult winners: (Italy) Giacomo Lazzarini & Roberta Benedetti
- May 14: #13 (Georgia (country)) World Open Tbilisi
  - World Open Latin Adult winners: (Poland) Edgar Marcos & Alina Nowak
- May 20: #14 (Portugal) World Open Paredes
  - World Open Latin Adult winners: (Poland) Edgar Marcos & Alina Nowak
- July 2: #15 (Georgia (country)) World Open Batumi
  - World Open Latin Adult winners: (Italy) Giacomo Lazzarini & Roberta Benedetti
- July 22 & 23: #16 (Germany) World Open Wuppertal
  - World Open Standard Adult winners: (Germany) Anton Skuratov & Alena Uehlin
  - World Open Latin Adult winners: (Germany) Marius-Andrei Bălan & Khrystyna Moshenska
- August 19 & 20: #17 (Estonia) World Open Tallinn
  - World Open Standard Adult winners: (Estonia) Ergo Lükk & Baile Orb
  - World Open Latin Adult winners: (Italy) Giacomo Lazzarini & Roberta Benedetti
- September 2 & 3: #18 (Thailand) World Open Bangkok
  - World Open Standard Adult winners: (Russia) Dmitry Zharkov & Olga Kulikova
  - World Open Latin Adult winners: (Germany) Marius-Andrei Bălan & Khrystyna Moshenska
- September 9 & 10: #19 (Slovakia) World Open Bratislava
- September 16 & 17: #20 (Czech Republic) World Open Prague
- September 16 & 17: #21 (Romania) World Open Sibiu
- September 24: #22 (Luxembourg) World Open Bertrange
- September 23: #23 (Portugal) World Open Lisbon
- September 23 & 24: #24 (Croatia) World Open Zagreb
- September 30 – October 1: #25 (Serbia) World Open Belgrade
- September 30: #26 (Czech Republic) World Open Ostrava
- October 7 & 8: #27 (Russia) World Open Moscow
- October 14 & 15: #28 (Poland) World Open Elbląg
- October 21: #29 (Netherlands) World Open Almere
- November 4: #30 (Latvia) World Open Riga
- November 5: #31 (Turkey) World Open Ankara
- November 11 & 12: #32 (Poland) World Open Warsaw
- November 18 & 19: #33 (Austria) World Open Vienna
- November 25: #34 (Estonia) World Open Tallinn
- December 2 & 3: #35 (Slovenia) World Open Maribor
- December 3: #36 (Lithuania) World Open Vilnius
- December 16: #37 (final) (Latvia) World Open Riga

=== International events ===
- February 10: WDSF World Championship (Standard Senior II) in (Belgium) Antwerp
  - Winners: (France) Pierre Payen & Isabelle Reyjal
  - 2nd place: (Germany) Gert Faustmann & Alexandra Kley
  - 3rd place: (Italy) Alberto Belometti & Barbara Pini
- February 18: WDSF European Ten Dance Championship in (Denmark) Copenhagen
  - Winners: (Germany) Dumitru Doga & Sarah Ertmer
  - 2nd place: (Denmark) Nikolaj Lund & Marta Kocik
  - 3rd place: (Estonia) Kirill Medianov & Elisaveta Semjonova
- February 25: WDSF World Championship (U21 Latin) in (Italy) Bassano del Grappa
  - Winners: (Slovenia) Vladislav Kolesnikov & Naja Dolenc
  - 2nd place: (Poland) Bartosz Lewandowski & Anna Walachowska
  - 3rd place: (France) Raffaello Brancato & Amandine Van Biesbroeck
- March 23: WDSF World Championship (Standard IV) in (Italy) Pieve di Cento
  - Winners: (Italy) Luciano Ceruti & Rosa Nuccia Cappello
  - 2nd place: (Italy) Alessandro Barbone & Patrizia Flamini
  - 3rd place: (Italy) Nicholas Nero & Anna Maria Arzenton
- April 1 & 2: DSE European Children Grand Prix in (Czech Republic) Brno
  - Junior I winners: (Russia) Sergey Burdin & Anastasia Sitnikova (Standard); (Russia) Georgy Gudovsky & Kamilla Shaymiardianova (Latin)
  - Junior II winners: (Russia) Aleksey Bessonov & Evgenia Kolmagorova (Standard); (Poland) Hubert Raczek & Magdalena Kowalska (Latin)
  - Juvenile I winners: (Moldova) Dragoș Josan & Alexandra Bezniuc (Standard & Latin)
  - Juvenile II winners: (Poland) Mateusz Stawowy & Sara Silva (Standard & Latin)
- April 1 & 2: DSE European Universities Championship in (Czech Republic) Brno
  - Adult Standard winners: (Poland) Kamil Kedra & Aleksandra Fron
  - Adult Latin winners: (Czech Republic) Jakub Richtár & Klára Petrušková
- April 9: WDSF PD World Championship (Show Dance Latin) in (Austria) Vienna
  - Winners: (Austria) Vadim Garbuzov & Kathrin Menzinger
  - 2nd place: (Russia) Mikhail Shchepkin & Anna Baklanova
  - 3rd place: (Italy) Marco Zingarelli & Ilaria Campana
- April 15: WDSF European Championship (Latin) in Cambrils
  - Winners: (Russia) Armen Tsaturyan & Svetlana Gudyno
  - Second place: (Moldova) Gabriele Goffredo & Anna Matus
  - Third place: (Germany) Marius-Andrei Balan & Khrystyna Moshenska
  - April 16: DSE European Championship of National Teams in (Spain) Cambrils
  - U21 winners: Romania (Latin and Standard)
  - Adults winners: Romania (Standard), France (Latin)
  - Senior I winners: Austria (Standard), Spain (Latin)
  - Overall winners: Romania (93 points)
- May 13: WDSF World Championship (U21) in (Latvia) Salaspils
  - Winners: (Latvia) Denis Gudovsky & Megija Dana Morīte
  - Second place: (Romania) Paul Rednic şi Roxana Lucaciu
  - Third place: (Poland) Mateusz Brzozowski & Justyna Możdżonek
- May 14: WDSF European Championship (Youth Latin) in (Moldova) Chișinău
  - Winners: (Moldova) Daniil Porcesco-Gozun și Anastasia Grunzu
  - Second place: (Romania) Coman Eduard Florentin & Tudorache Irina Elena
  - Third place: (Russia) Nikita Olinichenko & Elizaveta Pustornakova
- May 14: WDSF PD European Cup in (Hungary) Debrecen (Latin only)
  - Winners: (Italy) Daniele Sargenti & Uliana Fomenko
  - Second place: (Latvia) Marts Smolko & Tina Bazykina
  - Third place: (Russia) Alexandr Makarov & Anzhela Kuryshova
- May 14: WDSF PD European Championship in (Hungary) Debrecen (Standard only)
  - Winners: (Italy) Benedetto Ferruggia & Claudia Köhler
  - Second place: (Lithuania) Donatas Vėželis & Lina Chatkevičiūtė
  - Third place: (Hungary) László Csaba & Viktória Páli
- May 19: WDSF European Championship (standard) in (Czech Republic) Olomouc
  - Winners: (Russia) Dmitry Zharkov & Olga Kulikova
  - Second place: (Lithuania) Evaldas Sodeika & Ieva Žukauskaitė
  - Third place: (Lithuania) Vaidotas Lacitis & Veronika Golodneva
- June 11: WDSF PD European Championship (Latin) in (Russia) Saint Petersburg
  - Winners: (Russia) Vitaly Panteleev & Angelina Nechkhaeva
  - Second place: (Latvia) Marts Smolko & Tina Bazykina
  - Third place: (Germany) Pavel Pasechnik & Marta Arndt
- June 23: WDSF South European Championship in (Italy) Alassio
  - Standard winners: (Albania) Rinat Sunitulin & Maria Peregudova
  - Standard Second place: (Albania) Carmine Petrillo & Marzia Bonilauri
  - Standard Third place: (Portugal) João Carlos Costa Relha – Alicja Ciesielska
  - Latin winners: (Romania) Ionuț Alexandru Miculescu & Andra Păcurar
  - Latin Second place: (Italy) Vincenzo Termini & Elisa De Belardini
  - Latin Third place: (Serbia) Bojan Lazareski & Sarah Karakatsanis
- July 8 & 9: WDSF PD Asian Championship in Hong Kong
  - Standard PD winners: (China) Cheng Dan & LI Zhenni
  - Standard PD Second place: (Japan) Oleksii Guzyr & Rikako Ota
  - Standard PD Third place: (South Korea) Kim Kihwan & Park Ye Rang
  - Latin PD winners: (China) Hou Yao & Zhuang Ting
  - Latin PD Second place: (Hong Kong) Chan Hing Wai & Tin Lai Ki
  - Latin PD Third place: (China) Wang Jun & Jia Yiwen
- July 8 & 9: WDSF Asian Championship in Hong Kong
  - Standard winners: (China) Qiu Yuming & Wei Liying
  - Standard Second place: (Kazakhstan) Vladlen Kravchenko & Marina Laptiyeva
  - Standard Third place: (China) Yuan Shaoyang & Qi Chongxuan
  - Latin winners: (Singapore) Kostiantyn Samarskyi & Tay Isabelle
  - Latin Second place: (Kyrgyzstan) Artem Semerenko & Valeriya Kachalko
  - Latin Third place: (Kyrgyzstan) Aleksei Kibkalo & Tatiana Kogadei
- September 9: WDSF World Junior II Championship in (Slovakia) Bratislava
- September 9 & 10: WDSF World Championship in (China) Chengdu
- September 16: WDSF PD World Championship in (Czech Republic) Prague
- September 22 & 23: WDSF PD World Championship (Master Class) in (Luxembourg) Bertrange
- September 23: WDSF World Championship (Senior I) in (Hungary) Kistelek
- October 7: WDSF World Ten Dance Championship in (France) Marseille
- October 14: WDSF World Youth Latin Championship in (Spain) Castell-Platja d'Aro
- October 21: WDSF PD Latin World Championship in (Germany) Leipzig
- November 4: WDSF World Championship (U21 Ten Dance) in (Slovenia) Kranj
- November 4: WDSF European Cup in (Portugal) Vila Nova de Famalicão
- November 11: WDSF World Championship (Cheerlanding) in (Japan) Takasaki
- November 18: WDSF World Latin Championship in (Austria) Vienna
- November 25: WDSF Formation Standard World Championship in (Germany) Braunschweig
- December 9: WDSF Formation Latin World Championship in (Austria) Vienna
- December 16: WDSF World Championship (Youth Standard) in (Latvia) Riga

== Darts ==
- December 15, 2016 – January 2: 2017 PDC World Darts Championship in (England) London
  - (Netherlands) Michael van Gerwen defeated (Scotland) Gary Anderson, 7–3
- January 7 – 15: 2017 BDO World Darts Championship in (England) Frimley Green
  - Men: (England) Glen Durrant defeated (Netherlands) Danny Noppert, 7–3
  - Women: (England) Lisa Ashton defeated (Australia) Corrine Hammond, 3–0
- October 3 – 7: 2017 WDF World Cup in (Japan) Kobe
  - Men: Australia
  - Women: Netherlands
  - Juniors: Netherlands

=== PDC ===
==== Major tournaments ====
- January 28 – 29: 2017 Masters in (England) Milton Keynes
  - (Netherlands) Michael van Gerwen defeated (Scotland) Gary Anderson, 11–7
- February 2 – May 18: 2017 Premier League Darts at venues in England, Scotland, Netherlands, Wales, Ireland and Northern Ireland
  - (Netherlands) Michael van Gerwen defeated (Scotland) Peter Wright, 11–10
- March 3 – 5: 2017 UK Open in (England) Minehead
  - (Scotland) Peter Wright defeated (Wales) Gerwyn Price, 11–6
- June 1 – 4: 2017 PDC World Cup of Darts in (Germany) Frankfurt
  - Netherlands (Michael van Gerwen & Raymond van Barneveld) defeated Wales (Gerwyn Price & Mark Webster), 3–1
- July 22 – 30: 2017 World Matchplay in (England) Blackpool
  - (England) Phil Taylor defeated (Scotland) Peter Wright, 18–8
- September 16 – 17: 2017 Champions League of Darts in (Wales) Cardiff
  - (Austria) Mensur Suljović defeated (Scotland) Gary Anderson, 11–9
- October 1 – 7: 2017 World Grand Prix in (Republic of Ireland) Dublin
  - (Northern Ireland) Daryl Gurney defeated (Australia) Simon Whitlock, 5–4
- October 27 – 29: 2017 European Championship in (Belgium) Hasselt
  - (Netherlands) Michael van Gerwen defeated (England) Rob Cross, 11–7
- November 4 – 5: 2017 World Series of Darts Finals in (Scotland) Glasgow
  - (Netherlands) Michael van Gerwen defeated (Scotland) Gary Anderson, 11–6
- November 11 – 19: 2017 Grand Slam of Darts in (England) Wolverhampton
  - (Netherlands) Michael van Gerwen defeated (Scotland) Peter Wright, 16–12
- November 24 – 26: 2017 Players Championship Finals in (England) Minehead
  - (Netherlands) Michael van Gerwen defeated (Wales) Jonny Clayton, 11–2
- November 26: 2017 PDC World Youth Championship Final in (England) Minehead
  - (Belgium) Dimitri van den Bergh defeated (England) Josh Payne, 6–3

==== PDC European Tour ====
- March 24 – 26: 2017 German Darts Championship in (Germany) Hildesheim
  - (Scotland) Peter Wright defeated (Netherlands) Michael van Gerwen, 6–3
- April 15 – 17: 2017 German Darts Masters in (Germany) Jena
  - (Netherlands) Michael van Gerwen defeated (Netherlands) Jelle Klaasen, 6–2
- April 21 – 23: 2017 German Darts Open in (Germany) Saarbrücken
  - (Scotland) Peter Wright defeated (Netherlands) Benito van de Pas, 6–5
- May 5 – 7: 2017 European Darts Grand Prix in (Germany) Sindelfingen
  - (Scotland) Peter Wright defeated (Netherlands) Michael van Gerwen, 6–0
- May 12 – 14: 2017 Gibraltar Darts Trophy in Gibraltar
  - (England) Michael Smith defeated (Austria) Mensur Suljović, 6–4
- June 9 – 11: 2017 European Darts Matchplay in (Germany) Hamburg
  - (Netherlands) Michael van Gerwen defeated (Austria) Mensur Suljović, 6–3
- June 23 – 25: 2017 Austrian Darts Open in (Austria) Vienna
  - (Netherlands) Michael van Gerwen defeated (England) Michael Smith, 6–5
- June 30 – July 2: 2017 European Darts Open in (Germany) Leverkusen
  - (Scotland) Peter Wright defeated (England) Mervyn King, 6–2
- September 1 – 3: 2017 Dutch Darts Masters in (Netherlands) Maastricht
  - (Netherlands) Michael van Gerwen defeated (England) Steve Beaton, 6–1
- September 8 – 10: 2017 German Darts Grand Prix in (Germany) Mannheim
  - (Netherlands) Michael van Gerwen defeated (England) Rob Cross, 6–3
- September 22 – 24: 2017 International Darts Open in (Germany) Riesa
  - (Scotland) Peter Wright defeated (Belgium) Kim Huybrechts, 6–5
- October 13 – 15: 2017 European Darts Trophy in (Germany) Göttingen
  - (Netherlands) Michael van Gerwen defeated (England) Rob Cross, 6–4

==== World Series of Darts ====
- May 24 – 25: 2017 Dubai Darts Masters in (United Arab Emirates) Dubai
  - (Scotland) Gary Anderson defeated (Netherlands) Michael van Gerwen, 11–7
- July 6 – 7: 2017 Shanghai Darts Masters in (China) Shanghai
  - (Netherlands) Michael van Gerwen defeated (England) Dave Chisnall, 8–0
- July 14 – 15: 2017 US Darts Masters in (United States) Las Vegas
  - (Netherlands) Michael van Gerwen defeated (Northern Ireland) Daryl Gurney, 8–6
- August 11 – 13: 2017 Auckland Darts Masters in (New Zealand) Auckland
  - (Australia) Kyle Anderson defeated (Australia) Corey Cadby, 11–10
- August 18 – 20: 2017 Melbourne Darts Masters in (Australia) Melbourne
  - (England) Phil Taylor defeated (Scotland) Peter Wright, 11–8
- August 25 – 27: 2017 Perth Darts Masters in (Australia) Perth
  - (Scotland) Gary Anderson defeated (Netherlands) Raymond van Barneveld, 11–7
- October 20 – 21: 2017 German Darts Masters in (Germany) Düsseldorf
  - (Scotland) Peter Wright defeated (England) Phil Taylor, 11–4

=== BDO ===
==== Major tournaments ====
- May 26 – 29: 2017 World Trophy in (Wales) Barry
  - Men: (Australia) Peter Machin defeated (Wales) Martin Phillips, 10–8
  - Women: (Netherlands) Aileen de Graaf defeated (Russia) Anastasia Dobromyslova, 6–2
- September 25–27: 2017 World Masters in (England) Bridlington
  - Men: (Poland) Krzysztof Ratajski defeated (England) Mark McGeeney, 6–1
  - Woman: (England) Lorraine Winstanley defeated (Australia) Corrine Hammond, 5–2

== Disc golf ==
=== International ===
- May 12 – 14: 2017 Amateur World Doubles Championships in (United States) Mount Vernon, Texas
  - Advanced winners: (United States) Ricky Ovaitt & Adam Case (m) / (United States) Valerie Mandujano & Alexis Mandujano
- June 2 – 4: WFDF 2017 All African Ultimate Club Championships in Kenya
  - Winners: (South Africa) UCT Tigers, Second place: (South Africa) Ghost Ultimate, Third place: (Uganda) Kampala Ultimate, Fourth place: (Kenya) KFC – Kisumu Frisbee Club
- June 17 – 21: WFDF 2017 World Great Grandmasters Beach Ultimate Championships in (Portugal) Lisbon
- June 18 – 24: WFDF World Championships of Beach Ultimate in Royan
  - Mixed winners: United States, Second place: Canada, Third place: Germany
  - Men's winners: United States, Second place: United Kingdom, Third place: France
  - Women's winners: Russia, Second place: United States, Third place: United Kingdom
  - Master Mixed winners: United States, Second place: Canada, Third place: France
  - Men's Master winners: United States, Second place: France, Third place: Canada
  - Women's Master winners: United States, Second place: Canada, Third place: Australia
  - Men's GrandMaster winners: United States, Second place: United Kingdom, Third place: Canada
- June 20 – 24: PDGA World Championships in (United States) Augusta
  - Winners: (Ohio) Ricky Wysocki (m) / (Texas) Paige Pierce (f)
- July 24 – 29: WFDF 2017 World Freestyle & Overall Flying Disc Championships in (United Kingdom) Basingstoke
  - Overall winners: (Sweden) Tomas Burvall (m) / (United States) Juliana Korver (f)
  - Golf winners: (Sweden) Anton Lindh (m) / (United States) Juliana Korver (f)
  - Distance winners: (Sweden) Anton Lindh (m) / (United States) Niloofar Mossavarrahmani (f)
  - Accuracy winners: (United States) Conrad Damon (m) / (United States) Juliana Korver (f)
  - SCF winners: (Canada) Robert McLeod (m) / (Sweden) Anneli André (f)
  - Discathon winners: (Sweden) Anton Kappling (m) / (Sweden) Frida Högberg
  - DDC winners: (United States) (Harvey Brandt & Conrad Damon) (m) / (United States) (Juliana Korver & Beth Verish)
  - Freestyle winners: United States (Larry Imperiale & Paul Kenny) (m) / United States (Juliana Korver & Bianca Strunz)
- August 17 – 20: WFDF 2017 Asia Oceanic Ultimate and Guts Club Championships in Manila
  - The Philippines wins 4 medals. Singapore and Japan wins 3 medals. Chinese Taipei wins 2 medals.
- August 23 – 26: WFDF 2017 World Team Disc Golf Championships in (United Kingdom) Colchester
  - Winners: Canada, 2nd place: Finland, 3rd place: New Zealand
- November 14 – 19: WFDF 2017 Pan American Ultimate Club Championships in (Argentina) Cañuelas

=== Major tournaments ===
- April 12 – 15: National Collegiate Disc Golf Championships in North Augusta, South Carolina
  - Advanced winners: (Ohio) Ben Clark (m) / (California) Bayli Miller (f)
  - Teams winners: (Michigan) Ferris State University (m) / California State University
- June 2 – 4: United States Amateur Disc Golf Championships in Milford, Michigan
  - Advanced winner: (Michigan) Brandon Oleskie
- August 12 – 19: 2017 PDGA Master's World Championship in Grand Rapids, Michigan
  - Winners: (South Carolina) Barry Schultz (m) / (North Carolina) Elaine King (f)
- September 8 – 10: US Masters Disc Golf Championship in Des Moines, Iowa
- September 21 – 24: 2017 US Women's Disc Golf Championship Presented by Prodigy in Johnson City, Tennessee
- October 4 – 7: United States Disc Golf Championship in Rock Hill, South Carolina

=== 2017 American National Tour ===
- February 23 – 26: Gentlemen's Club Challenge in (Nevada) Henderson
  - Winners: (Ohio) Ricky Wysocki (m) / (Texas) Paige Pierce (f)
- April 27 – 29: Dynamic Discs Glass Blown Open in Emporia, Kansas
  - Winners: (California) Paul McBeth (m) / (Pennsylvania) Hannah Leatherman (f)
- May 19 – 21: Masters Cup in Santa Cruz, California
  - Winners: (California) Paul McBeth (m) / (Texas) Paige Pierce (f)
- June 9 – 11: Beaver State Fling Presented by KEEN in Estacada, Oregon
  - Winners: (Ohio) Ricky Wysocki (m) / (Texas) Paige Pierce (f)
- August 25 – 27: Pittsburgh Flying Disc Open Presented by Discraft in (Pennsylvania) Pittsburgh
  - Winners: (California) Paul McBeth (m) / (California) Catrina Allen (f)
- October 13 – 15: Hall of Fame Classic (final) in (Georgia (U.S. state)) Appling, Georgia

=== 2017 Disc Golf Pro Tour ===
- March 1 – 4: The Memorial in (Arizona) Scottsdale
  - Winners: (California) Paul McBeth (m) / (Texas) Paige Pierce (f)
- March 17 – 19: Waco Annual Charity Open in Waco, Texas
  - Winners: (North Carolina) Jeremy Koling (m) / (Texas) Paige Pierce (f)
- March 31 – April 2: Nick Hyde Memorial in Rockwall, Texas
  - Winners: (California) Paul McBeth (m) / (Idaho) Sarah Hokom (f)
- April 14 – 16: Jonesboro Open in Jonesboro, Arkansas
  - Winners: (Ohio) Ricky Wysocki (m) / (Texas) Paige Pierce (f)
- June 2 – 4: Utah Open in Ogden, Utah
  - Winners: (Ohio) Ricky Wysocki (m) / (California) Jessica Weese (f)
- August 3 – 6: Ledgestone Insurance Open in Peoria, Illinois
  - Winners: (California) Joshua Anthon (m) / (Oregon) Valarie Jenkins (f)
- August 17 – 20: Idlewild Open in (New York (state)) Burlington, New York
  - Winners: (Virginia) James Conrad (m) / (Texas) Paige Pierce (f)
- August 31 – September 3: Vibram Open in Leicester, Massachusetts
  - Winners: (Ohio) Ricky Wysocki (m) / (Texas) Paige Pierce (f)
- September 14 – 17: Green Mountain (final) in Jeffersonville, Vermont

=== 2017 Disc Golf World Tour ===
- January 26 – 29: Aussie Open 2017 in (Australia) Perth
  - Winners: (United States) Ricky Wysocki (m) / (Texas) Paige Pierce (f)
- May 12 – 14: Konopiště Open 2017 in (Czech Republic) Benešov
  - Winners: (United States) Ricky Wysocki (m) / (United States) Vanessa Van Dyken (f)
- July 20 – 23: European Open in (Finland) Nokia
  - Winners: (Finland) Timi Järvenpää (m) / (Finland) Heidi Laine (f)
- October 4 – 7: Disc Golf World Tour Championship 2017 USDGC (final) in (United States) Rock Hill, South Carolina

=== 2017 European Pro Tour ===
- May 19 – 21: Tali Open – EPT#1 in (Finland) Helsinki
  - Winners: (Finland) Jalle Stoor (m) / (Finland) Eveliina Salonen (f)
- June 9 – 11: Sula Open – EPT#2 in (Norway) Sula
  - Winners: (Finland) Seppo Paju (m) / (Estonia) Kristin Tattar (f)
- July 7 – 9: Skellefteå Open – EPT#3 in (Sweden) Skellefteå
  - Winners: (United States) Ricky Wysocki (m) / (Sweden) Ragna Bygde Lewis (f)
- July 14 – 16: Estonian Open – EPT#4 in (Estonia) Tallinn
  - Winners: (United States) Paul McBeth (m) / (Finland) Henna Blomroos (f)
- July 28 – 30: Turku TBC – EPT#5 in (Finland) Turku
  - Winners: (United States) Gregg Barsby (m) / (Finland) Maija Laitinen (f)
- September 8 – 10: Strudengau Open – EPT#6 (final) in (Austria) Sankt Thomas am Blasenstein

=== 2017 European Tour ===
- April 1 & 2: Dutch Discgolf Championships – ET #1 in (Netherlands) Rijswijk
  - Winners: (Finland) Raimo Sokka (m) / (Norway) Lydie Hellgren (f)
- April 15 & 16: Isle of Mull Classic – ET#2 in (United Kingdom) Fanmore
  - Winners: (United Kingdom) Simon Luard (m) / (United Kingdom) Sue Underwood (f)
- May 6 & 7: Kokkedal Open – ET#3 in (Denmark) Kokkedal & Hillerød
  - Winners: (Denmark) Karl Johan Nybo (m) / (Sweden) Camilla Grundén (f)
- May 25 – 27: Westside Discs Tyyni – ET#4 in (Finland) Helsinki & Sipoo
  - Winners: (Finland) Mikke Haaranen (m) / (Finland) Mila Puumala (f)
- June 2 – 4: The Battle at Bluebell Woods – ET#5 in (United Kingdom) Dunbar
  - Winners: (Iceland) Blær Örn Ásgeirsson (m) / (United Kingdom) Sue Underwood (f)
- July 1 & 2: Iceland Solstice Showdown – ET#6 in Reykjavík
  - Winners: (United States) Nikko Locastro (m) / (Norway) Lydie Hellgren (f)
- August 4 – 6: Valgjärve Open – ET#7 in (Estonia) Valgjärve
  - Winners: (United States) Jeremy Koling (m) / (Estonia) Kristin Tattar (f)
- August 12 & 13: Chateau Hostačov Open – ET#8 in (Czech Republic) Golčův Jeníkov
  - Winners: (Czech Republic) Přemysl Novák (m) / (Czech Republic) Eva Králová (f)
- August 19 & 20: Belgian Open – ET#9 in (Belgium) Braine-l'Alleud
  - Winners: (Switzerland) Tony Ferro (m) / (New Zealand) Hayley Flintoft (f)
- September 22 – 24: Copenhagen Open Classic – presented by DGA – ET#10 (final) in (Denmark) Copenhagen

== Field hockey ==
- January 13 – TBD: 2017 FIH Schedule

=== 2016–17 Men's FIH Hockey World League ===
Round 2:

- March 4 – 12: Event #1 in (Bangladesh) Dhaka
  - Qualified national teams to Semifinals: Malaysia & China
- March 11 – 19: Event #2 in Ulster
  - Qualified national teams to Semifinals: Ireland & France
- March 25 – April 2: Event #3 in (Trinidad and Tobago) Tunapuna
  - Qualified national teams to Semifinals: Japan & Canada

semifinals:

- June 15 – 25: Semifinal #1 in London
  - Qualified national teams to Finals: Netherlands, Argentina, & England
- July 8 – 23: Semifinal #2 in (South Africa) Johannesburg
  - Qualified national teams to Finals: Belgium, Germany, Australia, & Spain

final:

- December 2 – 10: Final in Bhubaneswar
  - Australia defeated Argentina, 2–1, to win their second consecutive Men's FIH Hockey World League title.
  - India took third place.

=== 2016–17 Women's FIH Hockey World League ===
Round 2

- January 14 – 22: Event #1 in Kuala Lumpur
  - Qualified national teams to Semifinals: Ireland, Malaysia, & Italy
- February 4 – 12: Event #2 in Valencia
  - Qualified national teams to Semifinals: Spain, Poland, & Scotland
- April 1 – 9: Event #3 in (Canada) Vancouver
  - Qualified national teams to Semifinals: India & Chile

semifinals

- June 21 – July 2: Semifinal #1 in (Belgium) Brussels
  - Qualified national teams to the Finals: Netherlands, China, & South Korea
- July 8 – 23: Semifinal #2 in (South Africa) Johannesburg
  - Qualified national teams to the Finals: United States, Germany, England, & Argentina

final

- November 18 – 26: Final in Auckland
  - The Netherlands defeated New Zealand, 3–0, to win their second Women's FIH Hockey World League title.
  - South Korea took third place.

=== Continental field hockey events ===
==== EHF ====
- January 13 – 15: 2017 EuroHockey Men's Indoor Junior Nations Championship in (Portugal) Lisbon
  - Poland defeated Austria, 5–4, in the final. Russia took third place.
- January 20 – 22: 2017 EuroHockey Women's Indoor Junior Nations Championship in (Austria) Vienna
  - The Czech Republic defeated Belarus, 1–1 (1–0 shoot out), in the final. Russia took third place.
- February 10 – 12: 2017 EuroHockey Men's Indoor Club Cup in (Austria) Vienna
  - (Germany) Uhlenhorst Mulheim defeated (Austria) SV Arminen, 3–2, in the final. (Netherlands) AH&BC Amsterdam took third place.
- February 10 – 12: 2017 EuroHockey Men's Indoor Club Trophy in (Croatia) Sveti Ivan Zelina
  - Champions: (Belgium) Racing Club de Bruxelles; Second: (Switzerland) HC Rotweiss Wettingen; Third: (Belarus) HC Minsk
- February 17 – 19: 2017 EuroHockey Women's Indoor Club Cup in (Switzerland) Wettingen
  - (Germany) Mannheimer HC defeated (Belarus) HC Minsk, 5–3, in the final. (Switzerland) HC Rotweiss Wettingen took third place.
- February 17 – 19: 2017 EuroHockey Women's Indoor Club Trophy in (Lithuania) Šiauliai
  - Champions: (Ukraine) MSC Sumchanka; Second: (Scotland) Dundee Wanderers; Third: (England) East Grinstead
- June 2 – 5: 2017 EuroHockey Women's Club Cup in (Netherlands) 's-Hertogenbosch
  - (Netherlands) 's-Hertogenbosch defeated (Germany) UHC Hamburg, 2–1 in the final. (Netherlands) AH&BC Amsterdam took third place.
- June 2 – 5: 2017 EuroHockey Men's Club Trophy in (Russia) Elektrostal
  - (Switzerland) HC Rotweiss Wettingen defeated (Austria) SV Arminen, 1–0, in the final. (Russia) Dinamo Elektrostal took third place.
- June 2 – 5: 2017 Eurohockey Women's Club Trophy in (Germany) Munich
  - (Germany) Münchner SC defeated (Spain) Club Campo de Madrid, 1–0, in the final. (Belarus) HC Minsk took third place.
- June 3 & 4: 2016–17 EuroHockey League Final Four in (Belgium) Brasschaat
  - (Germany) Rot-Weiss Köln defeated (Netherlands) HC Oranje-Rood, 3–2, in the final. (Belgium) KHC Dragons took third place.
- July 5 – 8: 2017 EuroHockey 5s for Boys in Wałcz
  - Poland defeated France, 4–2, in the final. Austria took third place.
- July 12 – 15: 2017 EuroHockey 5s for Girls in (France) Wattignies
  - Austria defeated Poland, 6–3, in the final. Turkey took third place.
- August 18 – 27: 2017 EuroHockey Championships for Men and Women in Amsterdam
  - Men: The Netherlands defeated Belgium, 4–2, in the final. England took third place.
  - Women: The Netherlands defeated Belgium, 3–0, in the final. England took third place.
- August 28 – September 3: 2017 EuroHockey Nations Junior Championships for Men and Women in (Spain) Valencia
  - Men: The Netherlands defeated Belgium, 5–3 in a shootout and after a 2–2 score in regular play, in the final.
  - Women: The Netherlands defeated Belgium, 6–0, in the final. England took third place.

==== AsHF ====
- October 11 – 22: 2017 Men's Hockey Asia Cup in (Bangladesh) Dhaka
  - India defeated Malaysia, 2–1, to win their third Men's Hockey Asia Cup title.
  - Pakistan took third place.
- October 28 – November 5: 2017 Women's Hockey Asia Cup in (Japan) Kakamigahara, Gifu
  - India defeated China, 5–4 in penalties and after a 1–1 score in regular play, to win their second Women's Hockey Asia Cup title.
  - South Korea took third place.

==== PaHF ====
- August 4 – 12: 2017 Men's Pan American Cup in Lancaster, Pennsylvania
  - Argentina defeated Canada, 2–0, to win their second consecutive and third overall Men's Pan American Cup title.
  - The United States took third place.
- August 5 – 13: 2017 Women's Pan American Cup in Lancaster, Pennsylvania
  - Argentina defeated Chile, 4–1, to win their fifth consecutive Women's Pan American Cup title.
  - The United States took third place.

==== OHF ====
- October 11 – 15: 2017 Oceania Cup for Men and Women in Sydney
  - Men: Australia defeated New Zealand, 6–0, to win their tenth consecutive Men's Oceania Cup title.
    - Papua New Guinea took third place.
  - Women: Australia defeated New Zealand, 2–0, to win their third consecutive and seventh overall Women's Oceania Cup title.
    - Papua New Guinea took third place.
  - Note: Both Australian teams have qualified to compete at the 2018 Men's Hockey World Cup and 2018 Women's Hockey World Cup.

==== AfHF ====
- October 22 – 29: 2017 Hockey Africa Cup of Nations for Men and Women in Ismailia
  - Men: South Africa defeated Egypt, 2–1, to win their eighth consecutive Men's Hockey Africa Cup of Nations title.
    - Ghana took third place.
  - Women: South Africa defeated Ghana, 4–0, to win their seventh consecutive Women's Hockey Africa Cup of Nations title.
    - Nigeria took third place.
  - Note: Both South African teams have qualified to compete at the 2018 Men's Hockey World Cup and the 2018 Women's Hockey World Cup.

== Fistball ==
=== World Games ===
- July 22 – 25: Fistball at the 2017 World Games in (Poland) Wrocław
  - In the final, Germany defeated Switzerland, 4–3 (9–11, 7–11, 11–6, 7–11, 11–8, 12–10, 11–9).
  - Austria took third place.

=== Continental & International championships ===
- July 15 – 16: EFA 2017 Fistball U18 Men's and Women's European Championship in Böttstein
  - Men's: Germany defeated Austria, 3–0 (12–10, 11–5, 11–6).
  - Switzerland took third place.
  - Women's: Germany defeated Austria, 3–1 (12–10, 10–12, 11–7, 11–8).
  - Switzerland took third place.
- August 26 & 27: Women's European Cup + U21 Men's European Cup in Calw
  - Women's winner: Germany
  - Men's U21 winner: Germany
- TBD: IFA 2017 Fistball Women's and Men's World Cup in TBD location
- October 20 – 22: 2017 Fistball U18 South America Championships & Cups in (Chile) Santiago
- November 24 – 26: 2017 Fistball South America Championships & Cups in (Argentina) Buenos Aires

=== European Fistball Association ===
- January 13 – 14: Men's Champions Cup Indoor 2017 in (Austria) Freistadt
  - In the final, (Germany) TSV Pfungstadt defeated (Austria) Union Compact Freistadt, 4–0.
  - (Germany) VfK 01 Berlin took third place.
- January 14 – 15: Women's Champions Cup Indoor 2017 in (Germany) Großenkneten
  - In the final, (Germany) TSV Dennach defeated (Germany) Ahlhorner SV, 4–0.
  - (Switzerland) TV Jona took third place.
- July 7 – 9: EFA 2017 Fistball Men's European Champions Cup in (Switzerland) Jona
  - In the final, (Germany) TSV Dennach defeated (Germany) Ahlhorner SV, 3–1.
  - (Austria) FBC ABAU Linz Urfahr took third place.
- July 7 – 9: EFA 2017 Fistball Women's European Champions Cup in (Germany) Käfertal
  - In the final, (Germany) TSV Pfungstadt defeated (Germany) VfK 1901 Berlin, 4–0.
  - (Switzerland) STV Wigoltingen took third place.
- July 7 – 9: EFA 2017 Fistball Men's European Cup in (Switzerland) Diepoldsau
  - In the final, (Switzerland) SVD Diepoldsau-Schmitter defeated (Germany) MTV Rosenheim, 4–0.
  - (Austria) Union Compact Freistadt took third place.

== Floorball ==
- May 3 – 7: 2017 Men's under-19 World Floorball Championships in Växjö
  - A Division: In the final, Finland defeated Sweden, 7–4, to their fourth Men's U19 Floorball World Championships. Czech Republic took third place.
  - B Division: Norway are promoted to A-division for U19 WFC 2019.
- August 23 – 27: EuroFloorball Challenge in (Slovakia) Trenčín
  - In the final, (Slovakia) Tsunami Záhorská Bystrica defeated (Ukraine) FBC Skala Melitopol, 9–4. (Slovakia) ŠK 1.FBC Trenčín took third place.
- October 6 – 8: Champions Cup in (Finland) Seinäjoki
  - Men's champion: (Sweden) IBF Falun
  - Women's champion: (Sweden) IKSU innebandy
- October 17 – 21: EuroFloorball Cup in (Latvia) Valmiera
- December 1 – 9: 2017 Women's World Floorball Championships in (Slovakia) Bratislava
  - Champion: Sweden

== Golf ==
=== 2017 Men's major golf championships ===
- April 6 – 9: 2017 Masters Tournament
  - Winner: (Spain) Sergio García (1st major championship, 10th PGA Tour victory, 13th European Tour victory)
- June 15 – 18: 2017 U.S. Open
  - Winner: (United States) Brooks Koepka (first Major championship win; second PGA Tour win)
- July 20 – 23: 2017 Open Championship
  - Winner: (United States) Jordan Spieth (third Major championship win, first Open Championship win; 11th PGA Tour win)
- August 10 – 13: 2017 PGA Championship
  - Winner: (United States) Justin Thomas (first Major championship win; fifth PGA Tour win)

=== 2017 World Golf Championships (WGC) ===
- March 2 – 5: 2017 WGC-Mexico Championship
  - Winner: (United States) Dustin Johnson (2nd WGC-Mexico Championship championship and 4th WGC championship overall; 14th PGA Tour victory)
- March 22 – 26: WGC-Dell Technologies Match Play
  - Winner: (United States) Dustin Johnson (1st WGC-Dell Technologies Match Play championship and 5th WGC championship overall; 15th PGA Tour victory)
- August 3 – 6: 2017 WGC-Bridgestone Invitational
  - Winner: (Japan) Hideki Matsuyama (1st WGC-Bridgestone Invitational championship and 2nd WGC championship overall; 5th PGA Tour victory)
- October 26 – 29: 2017 WGC-HSBC Champions
  - Winner: (England) Justin Rose (1st WGC-HSBC Champions championship and 2nd WGC championship overall; 8th PGA Tour victory)

=== Other men's golf events ===
- May 11 – 14: 2017 Players Championship
  - Winner: (South Korea) Kim Si-woo (first Players Championship title; second PGA win)
- May 25 – 28: 2017 BMW PGA Championship
  - Winner: (Sweden) Alex Norén (first BMW PGA Championship win; ninth PGA European Tour win)
- September 28 – October 1: 2017 Presidents Cup
  - (United States) Team USA defeated the (United Nations) International Team, 19–11, to win their seventh consecutive and tenth overall Presidents Cup title.

=== 2017 Senior major golf championships ===
- May 18 – 21: Regions Tradition
  - Winner: (Germany) Bernhard Langer (second consecutive Regions Tradition win; 31st PGA Tour Champions win)
- May 25 – 28: Senior PGA Championship
  - Winner: (Germany) Bernhard Langer (first Senior PGA Championship win; 32nd PGA Tour Champions win)
- June 29 – July 2: U.S. Senior Open
  - Winner: (United States) Kenny Perry (second U.S. Senior Open win; ninth PGA Tour Champions win)
- July 13 – 16: Senior Players Championship
  - Winner: (United States) Scott McCarron (first Senior Players Championship win; fourth PGA Tour Champions win)
- July 27 – 30: Senior Open Championship
  - Winner: (Germany) Bernhard Langer (third Senior Open Championship win; 33rd PGA Tour Champions win)

=== 2017 Women's major golf championships ===
- March 30 – April 2: 2017 ANA Inspiration
  - Winner: (South Korea) Ryu So-yeon (1st ANA Inspiration Championship and 2nd Major championship win; 4th LPGA Tour victory)
- June 29 – July 2: 2017 KPMG Women's PGA Championship
  - Winner: (United States) Danielle Kang (1st Women's PGA Championship and 1st LPGA Tour win)
- July 13 – 16: 2017 U.S. Women's Open
  - Winner: (South Korea) Park Sung-hyun (1st U.S. Women's Open and 1st LPGA Tour win)
- August 3 – 6: 2017 Women's British Open
  - Winner: (South Korea) In-Kyung Kim (1st Women's British Open win and 7th LPGA Tour win)
- September 14 – 17: 2017 Evian Championship
  - Winner: (Sweden) Anna Nordqvist (1st Women's Evian Championship win and 2nd Major championship win; 8th LPGA Tour victory)

=== Senior LPGA Championship ===
- July 10 – 12: 2017 Senior LPGA Championship at The Pete Dye Course of the French Lick Resort Casino in French Lick, Indiana
  - Winner: (England) Trish Johnson (first Senior LPGA Championship title win; second Legends Tour win)

=== 2017 Solheim Cup ===
- August 18 – 20: 2017 Solheim Cup at the Composite Course of Des Moines Golf and Country Club in West Des Moines, Iowa
  - Team (United States) USA defeated Team Europe, 16½ to 11½ points, to win their second consecutive and tenth overall Solheim Cup title.

== Handball ==
=== World handball events ===
- January 11 – 29: 2017 World Men's Handball Championship in France
  - France defeated Norway, 33–26, to win their second consecutive and sixth overall World Men's Handball Championship title.
  - Slovenia took third place.
- June 12 – 18: 2017 IHF Emerging Nations Championship in Bulgaria
  - The Faroe Islands defeated Turkey, 26–25, to win their second consecutive IHF Emerging Nations Championship title.
  - Kosovo took third place.
- July 11 – 16: 2017 Youth Beach Handball World Championships for Men and Women in Mauritius
  - Men: Spain defeated Italy, 2–1 in matches played, in the final. Russia took third place.
  - Women: Hungary defeated the Netherlands, in a shootout, in the final. Argentina took third place.
- July 18 – 30: 2017 Men's Junior World Handball Championship in Algeria
  - Spain defeated Denmark, 39–38 at extra time, to win their first Men's Junior World Handball Championship title.
  - France took third place.
- August 8 – 20: 2017 Men's Youth World Handball Championship in Georgia
  - France defeated Spain, 28–25, to win their second consecutive Men's Youth World Handball Championship title.
  - Denmark took third place.
- August 25 – 28: 2017 IHF Super Globe in (Qatar) Doha
  - (Spain) Barcelona defeated (Germany) Füchse Berlin, 29–25, to win their third IHF Super Globe title.
  - (North Macedonia) RK Vardar took third place.
- December 1 – 17: 2017 World Women's Handball Championship in Germany
  - France defeated Norway, 23–21, to win their second World Women's Handball Championship title.
  - Netherlands took third place.

=== EHF ===
==== EHF Nations events ====
- June 20 – 25: 2017 European Beach Handball Championship for Men and Women at Jarun Lake, Zagreb
  - Men: Spain defeated Russia, 2–0 in sets won, to win their third Men's European Beach Handball Championship title.
    - Croatia took third place.
  - Women: Norway defeated Poland, 2–0 in sets won, to win their first Women's European Beach Handball Championship title.
    - Spain took third place.
- July 2 – 8: 2017 European Universities Handball Championships in (Spain) Antequera
  - Men: (Romania) Ștefan cel Mare University of Suceava defeated (Germany) University of Duisburg-Essen, 23–22, in the final.
  - Women: (Germany) German Sport University Cologne defeated (Portugal) University of Aveiro, 41–30, in the final.
- July 3 – 7: 2017 European Open Handball Championship for Men in Gothenburg
  - Sweden defeated Austria, 34–22, to win their fourth European Open Handball Championship title.
  - Iceland took third place.
- July 27 – August 6: 2017 European Women's U-19 Handball Championship in (Slovenia) Celje
  - France defeated Russia, 31–26, to win their first European Women's U-19 Handball Championship title.
  - Denmark took third place.
- August 14 – 20: 2017 European Women's U-17 Handball Championship in (Lithuania) Klaipėda and (North Macedonia) Skopje
  - Germany defeated Norway, 23–18, to win their first European Women's U-17 Handball Championship title.
  - Hungary took third place.

==== EHF Club events for Men ====
- August 30, 2016 – April 9, 2017: 2016–17 SEHA League
  - (North Macedonia) RK Vardar defeated (Hungary) MVM Veszprém, 26–21, to win their third SEHA League title.
  - (Belarus) HC Meshkov Brest took third place.
- September 3, 2016 – May 21, 2017: 2016–17 EHF Cup
  - (Germany) Frisch Auf Göppingen defeated fellow German team, Füchse Berlin, 30–22, to win their second consecutive and fourth overall EHF Cup title.
  - (Germany) SC Magdeburg took third place.
- September 3, 2016 – June 4, 2017: 2016–17 EHF Champions League
  - (North Macedonia) RK Vardar defeated (France) Paris Saint-Germain, 24–23, to win their first EHF Champions League title.
  - (Hungary) MVM Veszprém took third place.
- November 19, 2016 – May 27, 2017: 2016–17 EHF Challenge Cup
  - (Portugal) Sporting CP defeated (Romania) AHC Potaissa Turda, 67–52 on aggregate, to win their first EHF Challenge Cup title.

==== EHF Club events for Women ====
- September 9, 2016 – May 14, 2017: 2016–17 Women's EHF Cup
  - (Russia) Rostov-Don defeated (Germany) SG BBM Bietigheim, 53–46 on aggregate, to win their first Women's EHF Cup title.
- September 10, 2016 – May 7, 2017: 2016–17 Women's EHF Champions League
  - (Hungary) Győri ETO defeated (North Macedonia) HC Vardar, 31–30 in extra time, to win their third Women's EHF Champions League title.
  - (Romania) CSM Bucharest took third place.
- October 15, 2016 – May 14, 2017: 2016–17 Women's EHF Challenge Cup
  - (Croatia) RK Lokomotiva Zagreb defeated (Sweden) H 65 Höör, 47–40 on aggregate, to win their first Women's EHF Challenge Cup title.

=== PATHF ===
- February 21 – 25: 2017 Pan American Youth Beach Handball Championship in Asunción (debut event)
  - Men: Brazil defeated Argentina, 2–1 in matches played, in the final. Venezuela took third place.
  - Women: Argentina defeated Brazil, 2–0 in matches played, in the final. Paraguay took third place.
- March 20 – 25: 2017 Pan American Men's Junior Handball Championship in (Paraguay) Asunción
  - Brazil defeated Argentina, 31–23, to win their third consecutive and sixth overall Pan American Men's Junior Handball Championship title.
  - Chile took third place.
- April 15 – 22: 2017 Pan American Men's Youth Handball Championship in Santiago
  - Argentina defeated Brazil, 22–21 in overtime, to win their eighth Pan American Men's Youth Handball Championship title.
  - Chile took third place.
- May 24 – 28: 2017 Pan American Men's Club Handball Championship in (Argentina) Buenos Aires
  - Champions: (Brazil) EC Pinheiros; Second: (Brazil) Handebol Taubaté; Third: (Argentina) UNLu
  - Note: EC Pinheiros has qualified to compete at the 2017 IHF Super Globe.
- June 18 – 25: 2017 Pan American Women's Handball Championship in Buenos Aires
  - Brazil defeated Argentina, 38–20, to win their fourth consecutive and tenth overall Pan American Women's Handball Championship title.
  - Paraguay took third place.
  - Note: All three teams mentioned above all qualified to compete in the 2017 World Women's Handball Championship.
- October 23 – 28: 2017 Pan American Women's Club Handball Championship in (Paraguay) Asunción
  - (Brazil) EC Pinheiros defeated (Uruguay) Atlético Goes, 33–23, to win their first Pan American Women's Club Handball Championship title.
  - (Argentina) Jockey Club Córdoba took third place.

=== AHF ===
- March 13 – 22: 2017 Asian Women's Handball Championship in Suwon
  - South Korea defeated Japan, 30–20, to win their third consecutive and thirteenth overall Asian Women's Handball Championship title.
  - China took third place.
  - Note: All three teams mentioned above have qualified to compete at the 2017 World Women's Handball Championship.
- May 8 – 15: 2017 Asian Beach Handball Championship for Men and Women in Pattaya
  - Men: Champions: Qatar; Second: Oman; Third: Iran
  - Women: Champions: Thailand; Second: Vietnam; Third: Chinese Taipei; Fourth: China
- July 15 – 23: 2017 Asian Women's Junior Handball Championship in Hong Kong
  - Champions: South Korea; Second: China; Third: Japan; Fourth: Kazakhstan
  - Note: All teams mentioned above have qualified to compete at the 2018 Women's Junior World Handball Championship.
- August 20 – 28: 2017 Asian Women's Youth Handball Championship in (Indonesia) Jakarta
  - Champions: South Korea; Second: Japan; Third: China; Fourth: Kazakhstan
  - Note: All teams mentioned above have qualified to compete at the 2018 Women's Youth World Handball Championship.
- September 23 – 29: 2017 Asian Women's Club League Handball Championship in (Uzbekistan) Tashkent
  - Champions: (Uzbekistan) AGMK Club; Second: (Kazakhstan) Ile Club; Third: (Kazakhstan) Almaty Club
- November 20 – 30: 2017 Asian Club League Handball Championship in (India) Hyderabad
  - Champions: (Bahrain) Al-Najma; Second: (Qatar) Al-Duhail; Third: (Qatar) Al-Ahli
- November 21 – 27: 2017 West Asian Women's Championship in (Bahrain) Manama

=== CAHB ===
- April 12: 2017 African Handball Super Cup for Men and Women in (Morocco) Agadir
  - Men: (Egypt) Al Ahly defeated fellow Egyptian team, Zamalek, 29–23.
  - Women: (Angola) 1º de Agosto defeated (Republic of the Congo) CARA Brazzaville, 26–17.
  - Note: Al Ahly and 1º de Agosto have qualified to compete in the 2017 IHF Super Globe event.
- April 13 – 22: 2017 African Handball Cup Winners' Cup for Men and Women in (Morocco) Agadir
  - Men: (Egypt) Al Ahly defeated (Tunisia) AS Hammamet, 31–22, to win their second African Handball Cup Winners' Cup title.
    - (Morocco) Widad Smara took third place.
  - Women: (Angola) 1º de Agosto defeated (Cameroon) FAP Yaoundé, 24–16, to win their third consecutive African Women's Handball Cup Winners' Cup title.
    - (Republic of the Congo) CARA Brazzaville took third place.
- September 4 – 10: 2017 African Women's Junior Handball Championship in Abidjan
  - Angola defeated Egypt, 29–19, to win their third consecutive and ninth overall African Women's Junior Handball Championship title.
  - Note: The two teams mentioned here, plus Ivory Coast, have qualified to compete at the 2018 Women's Junior World Handball Championship.
- September 11 – 17: 2017 African Women's Youth Handball Championship in (Ivory Coast) Abidjan
  - Champions: Egypt; Second: Angola; Third: DR Congo
- October 20 – 29: 2017 African Handball Champions League for Men and Women in (Tunisia) Hammamet
  - Men: (Egypt) Zamalek defeated (Tunisia) Espérance, 31–29 in extra time, to win their tenth Men's African Handball Champions League title.
    - (Egypt) Al Ahly took third place.
  - Note: Zamalek has qualified to compete at the 2018 IHF Super Globe.
  - Women: (Angola) Primeiro de Agosto defeated (Tunisia) ASF Sfax, 30–17, to win their fourth consecutive African Women's Handball Champions League title.
    - (Cameroon) FAP Yaoundé took third place.

== Korfball ==
=== World Cups and Continental Championships ===
- April 13 – 17: 2017 U19 Korfball World Cup in Leeuwarden
  - In the final, Netherlands defeated Chinese Taipei, 28–16.
  - Belgium took third place.
- June 23 – 25: 2017 U17 Korfball World Cup in Schijndel
  - In the final, Netherlands defeated Belgium, 22–11.
  - England took third place.
- August 8 – 13: IKF Asia U19 & U16 Korfball4 Championship in Hong Kong
- August 19 & 20: IKF Open European Beach Korfball Championship 2017 in The Hague
  - U19: In the final, Netherlands 2 defeated Hungary, 8–6.
  - Belgium 1 took third place.
  - Seniors: In the final, Netherlands 2 defeated Portugal, 8–4.
  - Belgium 1 took third place.

=== Europe ===
- January 12 – 14: 2017 Korfball Europa Cup in Netherlands
  - In the final, (Netherlands) KV TOP defeated (Belgium) Boeckenberg KC, 37–27, to win her 3rd Europa Cup.
  - (England) Trojans Korfball Club took third place.
- January 27 – 29: 2017 Korfball Europa Shield in Portugal
  - In the final, (England) Bec Korfball Club defeated (Germany) Schweriner KC, 10–9, to win her 3rd consecutive Europa Shield.
  - (Portugal) CRC Quinta Dos Lombos took third place.

== Lacrosse ==
=== Lacrosse World Cup ===
- July 12 – 22: 2017 Women's Lacrosse World Cup in Guildford
  - The United States defeated Canada, 10–5, to win their third consecutive and eighth overall Women's Lacrosse World Cup title.
  - England won the bronze medal.

=== Major League Lacrosse ===
- April 22 – August 19: 2017 Major League Lacrosse season
  - The Ohio Machine defeated the (Colorado) Denver Outlaws, 17–12, to win their first Major League Lacrosse title.

=== NCAA Lacrosse Championship ===
- May 7 – 28: 2017 NCAA Division III Men's Lacrosse Championship at Gillette Stadium in Foxborough, Massachusetts
  - The (Maryland) Salisbury Sea Gulls defeated the (New York (state)) RIT Tigers, 15–7, to win their second consecutive and 12th overall NCAA Division III Men's Lacrosse Championship title.
- May 12 – 28: 2017 NCAA Division I Women's Lacrosse Championship at Gillette Stadium in Foxborough, Massachusetts
  - The Maryland Terrapins defeated the (Massachusetts) Boston College Eagles, 16–13, to win their 13th NCAA Division I Women's Lacrosse Championship title.
- May 13 – 28: 2017 NCAA Division II Men's Lacrosse Championship at Gillette Stadium in Foxborough, Massachusetts
  - The (South Carolina) Limestone Saints defeated the (Massachusetts) Merrimack Warriors, 11–9, to win their fifth NCAA Division II Men's Lacrosse Championship title.
- May 13 – 29: 2017 NCAA Division I Men's Lacrosse Championship at Gillette Stadium in Foxborough, Massachusetts
  - The Maryland Terrapins defeated the Ohio State Buckeyes, 9–6, to win their third NCAA Division I Men's Lacrosse Championship title.
- May 19 – 21: 2017 NCAA Division II Women's Lacrosse Championship at BU Sports Stadium in Bloomsburg, Pennsylvania
  - The (New York (state)) Adelphi Panthers defeated the Florida Southern Moccasins, 6–4, to win their eighth NCAA Division II Women's Lacrosse Championship title.
- May 27 & 28: 2017 NCAA Division III Women's Lacrosse Championship at Donald J. Kerr Stadium in Salem, Virginia
  - The (Pennsylvania) Gettysburg Bullets defeated the (New Jersey) TCNJ Lions, 6–5, to win their second NCAA Division III Women's Lacrosse Championship title.

== Multi-sport events ==
- January 28 – February 8: 2017 Winter Universiade in (Kazakhstan) Almaty
  - Russia won both the gold and overall medal tallies.
- February 12 – 17: 2017 European Youth Olympic Winter Festival in (Turkey) Erzurum
  - Russia won both the gold and overall medal tallies.
- February 19 – 26: 2017 Asian Winter Games in Sapporo
  - Japan won both the gold and overall medal tallies.
- February 23 – 27: 2017 Winter Military World Games in Sochi
  - Russia won both the gold and overall medal tallies.
- April 21 – 30: 2017 World Masters Games in (New Zealand) Auckland
  - For results, click here.
- May 12 – 22: 2017 Islamic Solidarity Games in Baku
  - Azerbaijan won the gold medal tally; Turkey won the overall medal tally.
- May 29 – June 3: 2017 Games of the Small States of Europe in City of San Marino
  - Luxembourg won both the gold and overall medal tallies.
- June 24 – 30: 2017 Island Games in Gotland
  - The Isle of Man won both the gold and overall medal tallies.
- July 13 – 21 : 2017 ASEAN School Games in Singapore
  - Thailand won both the gold and overall medal tallies.
- July 16 – 23: 2017 North American Indigenous Games in (Canada) Toronto
  - British Columbia won both the gold and overall medal tallies.
- July 18 – 23: 2017 Commonwealth Youth Games in (The Bahamas) Nassau
  - England won both the gold and overall medal tallies.
- July 18 – 30: 2017 Summer Deaflympics in (Turkey) Samsun
  - Russia won both the gold and overall medal tallies.
- July 20 – 30: World Games 2017 in (Poland) Wrocław
  - Russia won both the gold and overall medal tallies.
- July 21 – 30: 2017 Jeux de la Francophonie in (Ivory Coast) Abidjan
  - France won both the gold and overall medal tallies.
- July 22 – 30: 2017 European Youth Summer Olympic Festival in (Hungary) Győr
  - Russia won both the gold and overall medal tallies.
- July 28 – August 13: 2017 Canada Summer Games in (Manitoba) Winnipeg
  - Ontario won both the gold and overall medal tallies.
- August 7 – 16: 2017 World Police and Fire Games in (United States) Los Angeles
  - Note: These Games was supposed to be in Montreal, but it was relocated because of a boycott by the police and firefighter unions over pension reform.
  - For results, click here.
- August 19 – 30: 2017 Summer Universiade in (Chinese Taipei) Taipei
  - Japan won both the gold and overall medal tallies.
- August 19 – 31: 2017 Southeast Asian Games, in Kuala Lumpur
  - Malaysia won both the gold and overall medal tallies.
- September 17 – 23: 2017 ASEAN Para Games in Kuala Lumpur
  - Indonesia won the gold medal tally. Malaysia won the overall medal tally.
- September 17 – 27: 2017 Asian Indoor and Martial Arts Games in Ashgabat
  - Turkmenistan won both the gold and overall medal tallies.
- September 23 – 30: 2017 Invictus Games in (Canada) Toronto
  - For results, click here.
- September 29 – October 8: 2017 South American Youth Games in (Chile) Santiago
  - Brazil won both the gold and overall medal tallies.
- November 11 – 25: 2017 Bolivarian Games in Santa Marta
  - Colombia won both the gold and overall medal tallies.
- November 12 – 19: 2017 Asian Youth Games in (Indonesia) Jakarta
  - Event cancelled. No alternate city here to host this event. The 2021 Asian Youth Games will be the next edition to be hosted.
- December 3 – 17: 2017 Central American Games in (Nicaragua) Managua
  - Guatemala won both the gold and overall medal tallies.
- December 4 – 15: 2017 Pacific Mini Games in (Vanuatu) Port Vila
  - (France) /New Caledonia won the gold medal tally. Papua New Guinea won the overall medal tally.
- December 10 – 14: 2017 Asian Youth Para Games in (United Arab Emirates) Dubai
  - Japan won the gold medal tally. Iran won the overall medal tally.

== Netball ==
International tournaments

Date	Tournament	Winners	Runners up
28 Jan–5 Feb	First 2017 Netball Quad Series	Australia	New Zealand
6–13 May	2017 Asian Youth Netball Championship	Singapore	Malaysia
5–15 April	2017 Netball World Youth Cup	New Zealand	Australia
14–20 August	2017 SEA Games	Malaysia	Singapore
26 Aug–3 Sept	Second 2017 Netball Quad Series	New Zealand	Australia
7–13 September	2017 Taini Jamison Trophy Series	New Zealand	England
6–8 October	2017 Netball Europe Open Championships	England	Northern Ireland
5–14 October	2017 Constellation Cup	Australia	New Zealand
28–29 October	2017 Fast5 Netball World Series	England	Jamaica
13–15 December	2017 Pacific Mini Games	Papua New Guinea	Tonga

Major national leagues, club tournaments

Host	League/Competition	Winners	Runners up
Australia	Suncorp Super Netball	Sunshine Coast Lightning	Giants Netball
New Zealand	ANZ Premiership	Southern Steel	Central Pulse
New Zealand	Super Club	Southern Steel	Central Pulse
United Kingdom	Netball Superleague	Wasps Netball	Loughborough Lightning

== Pickleball ==
- September 13 – 17: The first Bainbridge Cup held in Madrid, Spain along with the Spanish Open Pickleball Championships

== Rugby league ==
=== World rugby league championships ===
- October 26 – December 2: 2017 Rugby League World Cup in Australia, New Zealand and Papua New Guinea
  - Australia defeated England, 6–0, to win their second consecutive and eleventh overall Rugby League World Cup title.
- November 16 – December 2: 2017 Women's Rugby League World Cup in Australia
  - Australia defeated New Zealand, 23–16, to win their second consecutive Women's Rugby League World Cup title.

=== Club seasons and championships ===
- February 18 & 19: 2017 World Club Series in England
  - Game 1: (England) Warrington Wolves defeated (Australia) Brisbane Broncos, 27–18, at Halliwell Jones Stadium, Warrington
  - Game 2 (World Club Challenge): (England) Wigan Warriors defeated (Australia) Cronulla-Sutherland Sharks, 22–6, at DW Stadium, Wigan
- February 9 – October 7: Super League XXII in England and France (final at Old Trafford, Manchester)
  - The Leeds Rhinos defeated the Castleford Tigers, 24–6, to win their eighth Super League title.
- March 2 – October 1: 2017 NRL season in Australia and New Zealand (final at Stadium Australia, Sydney)
  - The Melbourne Storm defeated the North Queensland Cowboys, 34–6, to win their third NRL title.

== Shooting sport ==
=== 2017 ISSF World Cup ===
- February 22 – March 4: All Guns World Cup #1 in (India) New Delhi
  - Pistol
  - 10 m Air Pistol winners: (Japan) Tomoyuki Matsuda (m) / (China) LIN Yuemei (f)
  - Men's 25 m Rapid Fire Pistol winner: (China) LAO Jiajie
  - Men's 50 m Pistol winner: (India) Jitu Rai
  - Women's 25 m Pistol winner: (Thailand) Naphaswan Yangpaiboon
  - Rifle
  - 10 m Air Rifle winners: (China) SONG Buhan (m) / (China) SHI Mengyao (f)
  - 50 m Rifle Three Positions winners: (China) Hui Zicheng (m) / (China) ZHANG Yiwen (f)
  - Men's 50 m Rifle Prone winner: (Japan) Toshikazu Yamashita
  - Shotgun
  - Skeet winners: (Italy) Riccardo Filippelli (m) / (United States) Kim Rhode (f)
  - Trap winners: (Italy) Simone d'Ambrosio (m) / (Australia) Penny Smith (f)
  - Men's Double Trap winner: (Australia) James Willett
- March 17 – 27: Shotgun World Cup #1 in (Mexico) Acapulco
  - Skeet winners: (Italy) Marco Sablone (m) / (United States) Kim Rhode (f)
  - Trap winners: (Spain) Alberto Fernández (m) / (United States) Ashley Carroll (f)
  - Men's Double Trap winner: (India) Ankur Mittal
- April 28 – May 8: Shotgun World Cup #2 (final) in (Cyprus) Larnaca
  - Skeet winners: (Argentina) Federico Gil (m) / (China) Wei Meng (f)
  - Trap winners: (Spain) Antonio Bailon (m) / (China) WANG Xiaojing (f)
  - Men's Double Trap winner: (Italy) Daniele Di Spigno
- May 17 – 24: Rifle and Pistol World Cup #1 in (Germany) Munich
  - Pistol
  - 10 m Air Pistol winners: (Ukraine) Pavlo Korostylov (m) / (Greece) Anna Korakaki (f)
  - Men's 25 m Rapid Fire Pistol winner: (France) Jean Quiquampoix
  - Men's 50 m Pistol winner: (South Korea) Jin Jong-oh
  - Women's 25 m Pistol winner: (China) Zhang Jingjing
  - Rifle
  - 10 m Air Rifle winners: (Russia) Sergey Kamenskiy (m) / (Romania) Laura Georgeta Ilie (f)
  - 50 m Rifle Three Positions winners: (France) Alexis Raynaud (m) / (Croatia) Snježana Pejčić (f)
  - Men's 50 m Rifle Prone winner: (South Korea) Kim Jong-hyun
- June 6 – 14: Rifle and Pistol World Cup #2 (final) in (Azerbaijan) Qabala
  - Pistol
  - 10 m Air Pistol winners: (China) YANG Wei (m) / (Austria) Sylvia Steiner (f)
  - Men's 25 m Rapid Fire Pistol winner: (Germany) Christian Reitz
  - Men's 50 m Pistol winner: (Ukraine) Oleh Omelchuk
  - Women's 25 m Pistol winner: (China) LIN Yuemei
  - Rifle
  - 10 m Air Rifle winners: (Serbia) Milutin Stefanović (m) / (China) PENG Xinyi (f)
  - 50 m Rifle Three Positions winners: (Hungary) István Péni (m) / (China) SHI Mengyao (f)
  - Men's 50 m Rifle Prone winner: (Denmark) Torben Grimmel
- October 23 – 30: All Guns World Cup #2 (final) in New Delhi
  - Pistol
  - 10 m Air Pistol winners: (Japan) Tomoyuki Matsuda (m) / (France) Céline Goberville (f)
  - Men's 25 m Rapid Fire Pistol winner: (United States) Keith Sanderson
  - Men's 50 m Pistol winner: (Serbia) Damir Mikec
  - Women's 25 m Pistol winner: (South Korea) Kim Min-jung
  - Mixed 10 m Air Pistol winners: India (Heena Sidhu & Jitu Rai)
  - Rifle
  - 10 m Air Rifle winners: (Hungary) István Péni (m) / (Serbia) Andrea Arsović (f)
  - 50 m Rifle Three Positions winners: (France) Alexis Raynaud (m) / (Germany) Jolyn Beer (f)
  - Men's 50 m Rifle Prone winner: (Denmark) Torben Grimmel
  - Mixed 10 m Air Rifle winners: China (SONG Buhan & WU Mingyang)
  - Shotgun
  - Skeet winners: (Italy) Riccardo Filippelli (m) / (United States) Kim Rhode (f)
  - Trap winners: (Spain) Alberto Fernández (m) / (Italy) Alessia Iezzi (f)
  - Men's Double Trap winner: (China) Hu Binyuan (World Record)
  - Mixed team Trap winners: Spain (Antonio Bailon & Beatriz Martinez)

=== International and continental shooting events ===
- March 6 – 12: 2017 10m European Shooting Championships in (Slovenia) Maribor
  - Russia won both the gold and overall medal tallies.
- April 19 – May 3: 2017 African Shooting Championships in Cairo
  - Egypt won both the gold and overall medal tallies.
- June 22 – 26: 2017 ISSF Target Sprint World Championships in Suhl
  - Target Sprint winners: (Germany) Michael Herr (m) / (Germany) Anita Flack (f)
  - Junior Target Sprint winners: (Germany) Sven Mueller (m) / (Germany) Madlen Guggenmos (f)
  - Team Target Sprint winners: Germany (m) / Germany (f)
  - Mixed team Target Sprint winners: Czech Republic (Pavla Schorna Matyasova & Tomas Bystricky)
- June 22 – 29: 2017 ISSF Junior World Championships in Rifle and Pistol in (Germany) Suhl
  - China won both the gold and overall medal tallies.
- July 21 – August 4: 2017 European Shooting Championships in (Azerbaijan) Baku
  - Ukraine won the gold medal tally. Russia won the overall medal tally.
- August 15 – 22: 2017 ISSF Junior Shotgun World Cup in (Italy) Porpetto
  - Junior Trap winners: (Spain) Adria Martinez Torres (m) / (Italy) Erica Sessa (f)
  - Junior Men's Double Trap winner: (United Kingdom) James Dedman
  - Junior Skeet winners: (Italy) Elia Sdruccioli (m) / (United States) Katharina Monika Jacob (f)
- August 30 – September 11: 2017 World Shotgun Championships in (Russia) Moscow
  - Senior Trap winners: (Italy) Daniele Resca (m) / (Italy) Jessica Rossi (f)
  - Men's Senior Double Trap winner: (Russia) Vitaly Fokeev
  - Senior Skeet winners: (Italy) Gabriele Rossetti (m) / (United States) Dania Jo Vizzi (f)
  - Junior Trap winners: (France) Clement Francis Andre Bourgue (m) / (Italy) Maria Lucia Palmitessa (f)
  - Junior Men's Double Trap winner: (United Kingdom) James Dedman
  - Junior Skeet winners: (Denmark) Emil Kjelgaard Petersen (m) / (United States) Katharina Monika Jacob (f)

== Skateboarding ==
=== World Championships ===
- November 28 & 29: Teutonia IGSA World Championships in (Brazil) Teutônia

=== Street League Skateboarding ===
World Tour

- March 4 & 5: Tampa Pro in (United States) Tampa
  - Winner: (United States) Louie Lopez, 2nd place: (Brazil) Luan Oliveira, 3rd place: (Brazil) Kevin Hoefler
- May 20 & 21: SLS Nike SB Pro Open in (Spain) Barcelona
  - Winner: (United States) Nyjah Huston, 2nd place: (United States) Shane O'Neill, 3rd place: (Japan) Yuto Horigome
- June 24: Stop #1 in (Germany) Munich
  - Winner: (United States) Nyjah Huston, 2nd place: (Japan) Yuto Horigome, 3rd place: (Brazil) Carlos Ribeiro
- August 13: Stop #2 in (United States) Chicago
  - Winner: (United States) Dashawn Jordan, 2nd place: (United States) Torey Pudwill, 3rd place: (United States) Shane O'Neill
- September 15: SLS Nike SB Super Crown World Championship in (United States) Los Angeles (final)

=== Downhill World Cup ===
- February 17 & 18: Newton's in (Australia) Bathurst, New South Wales
  - Winners: (Sweden) Mauritz Armfelt (m) / (United States) Emily Pross (f)
  - Masters winner: (Australia) Adam Yates
  - Junior winner: (New Zealand) Taylor Cook
  - Luge winner: (Malaysia) Abdil Mahdzan
- April 14 – 16: Keeping it High in (Philippines) Maragondon
  - Winners: (Brazil) Douglas da Silva (m) / (New Zealand) Elissa Mah
  - Masters winner: (Australia) Benjamin Hay
  - Junior winner: (New Zealand) Taylor Cook
  - Luge winner: (Malaysia) Abdil Mahdzan
- April 28 – 30: Arirang Hill Fest in (South Korea) Jeongseon County
  - Winners: (United States) Aaron Hampshire (m) / (South Korea) Kaila Dasol Jong
  - Masters winner: (Australia) Benjamin Hay
  - Junior winner: (New Zealand) Taylor Cook
  - Luge winner: (Malaysia) Abdil Mahdzan
- May 26 – 28: Yaku Raymi Water Fest in (Peru) Huallin
  - Winners: (Brazil) Carlos Paixão (m) / (United States) Candy Dungan (f)
  - Masters winner: (Brazil) Leonardo Discacciati
  - Junior winner: (Brazil) Bruno Vidal Vieira
  - Luge winner: (United States) Ryan Farmer
- June 9 – 11: Apac Championship in (Brazil) Nova Lima
  - Winners: (Brazil) Thiago Gomes Lessa (m) / (Brazil) Melissa Brogni
  - Masters winner: (Brazil) Adriano Silveira
  - Junior winner: (Brazil) Murilo Araujo
  - Luge winner: (United States) Ryan Farmer
- June 17 & 18: La Leonera DH in (Colombia) La Leonera
  - Winners: (Brazil) Thiago Gomes Lessa (m) / (Brazil) Luana Campos (f)
  - Masters winner: (Colombia) Marco Vidales
  - Junior winner: (Brazil) Bruno Vidal Vieira
  - Luge winner: (United States) Ryan Farmer
- July 13 – 16: King's Gate in (Austria) Hinterstoder
  - Winners: (Switzerland) Tristan Cardillo (m) / (United States) Emily Pross (f)
  - Masters winner: (Canada) Nicolas Desmarais
  - Junior winner: (Switzerland) Tristan Cardillo
  - Luge winner: (Spain) Mikel Echegaray Diez
- July 19 – 22: Kozakov Challenge in (Czech Republic) Kozákov Mountain
  - Winners: (Brazil) Thiago Gomes Lessa (m) / (United States) Emily Pross (f)
  - Masters winner: (Canada) Nicolas Desmarais
  - Junior winner: (Switzerland) Tristan Cardillo
  - Luge winner: (Spain) Mikel Echegaray Diez
- July 26 – 29: Verdicchio Race in (Italy) Poggio Cupro
  - Winners: (Switzerland) Tristan Cardillo (m) / (France) Lyde Begue
  - Masters winner: (Mexico) Uldis Tretmanis
  - Junior winner: (Switzerland) Tristan Cardillo
  - Luge winner: (Canada) Kolby Parks
- August 3 – 6: Teolo Euroskate in Italy
  - Winners: (Brazil) Carlos Paixão (m) / (United States) Emily Pross (f)
  - Masters winner: (Spain) Damian Derek Blanquer Gelez
  - Junior winner: (Switzerland) Tristan Cardillo
  - Luge winner: (Spain) Mikel Echegaray Diez
- September 8 – 10: Killington Throwdown (final) in United States

== Snooker ==
=== Snooker season 2016/2017 ===
May

- May 5 – 8, 2016: Vienna Snooker Open in (Austria) Vienna
  - (England) Peter Ebdon defeated (England) Mark Davis, 5–1.

June

- June 8 – 12, 2016: Pink Ribbon in (England) Gloucester
  - (Wales) Jamie Jones defeated (England) David Grace, 4–3.
- June 12 – 16, 2016: China Professional Championship in Fuzhou
  - (China) Zhang Anda defeated (China) Zhou Yuelong, 5–1.
- June 22 – 24, 2016: 2016 Riga Masters in (Latvia) Riga
  - (Australia) Neil Robertson defeated (England) Michael Holt, 5–2.

July

- July 5 – 9: 2016 Indian Open in (India) Hyderabad
  - (Scotland) Anthony McGill defeated (England) Kyren Wilson 5–2.
- July 25 – 31: 2016 World Open in (China) Yushan
  - (England) Ali Carter defeated (England) Joe Perry 10–8.

August

- August 24–28: 2016 Paul Hunter Classic in (Germany) Fürth
  - (England) Mark Selby defeated (England) Tom Ford 4–2.

September

- September 5 – 10: 2016 Six-red World Championship in (Thailand) Bangkok
  - (China) Ding Junhui defeated (England) Stuart Bingham 8–7.
- September 19 – 25: 2016 Shanghai Masters in (China) Shanghai
  - (China) Ding Junhui defeated (England) Mark Selby 10–6.

October

- October 3 – 9: 2016 European Masters in (Romania) Bucharest
  - (England) Judd Trump defeated (England) Ronnie O'Sullivan 9–8.
- October 10 – 16: 2016 English Open in (England) Manchester
  - (China) Liang Wenbo defeated (England) Judd Trump 9–6.

November

- November 1 – 5: 2016 China Championship in Guangzhou
  - (Scotland) John Higgins defeated (England) Stuart Bingham 10–7.
- November 7 – 12: 2016 Champion of Champions in (England) Coventry
  - (Scotland) John Higgins defeated (England) Ronnie O'Sullivan 10–7.
- November 14 – 20: 2016 Northern Ireland Open in Belfast
  - (England) Mark King defeated (England) Barry Hawkins 9–8.
- November 22 – December 4: 2016 UK Championship in (England) York
  - (England) Mark Selby defeated (England) Ronnie O'Sullivan 10–7.

December

- December 12 – 18: 2016 Scottish Open in (Scotland) Glasgow
  - (Hong Kong) Marco Fu defeated (Scotland) John Higgins 9–4.

January

- January 15 – 22: 2017 Masters in (England) London
  - (England) Ronnie O'Sullivan defeated (England) Joe Perry 10–7.

February

- February 1 – 5: 2017 German Masters in (Germany) Berlin
  - (England) Anthony Hamilton defeated (England) Ali Carter 9–6.
- February 6 – 12: 2017 World Grand Prix in (England) Preston
  - (England) Barry Hawkins defeated (Wales) Ryan Day 10–7.
- February 13 – 19: 2017 Welsh Open in (Wales) Cardiff
  - (England) Stuart Bingham defeated (England) Judd Trump 9–8.
- February 23 – 26: 2017 Snooker Shoot Out in (England) Watford
  - (Scotland) Anthony McGill defeated (China) Xiao Guodong 1–0 (67–19).

March

- March 1 – 2: 2017 Championship League Winners' Group in (England) Coventry
  - (Scotland) John Higgins defeated (Wales) Ryan Day 3–0.
- March 3 – 5: 2017 Gibraltar Open in Gibraltar
  - (England) Shaun Murphy defeated (England) Judd Trump 4–2.
- March 6 – 12: 2017 Players Championship in (Wales) Llandudno
  - (England) Judd Trump defeated (Hong Kong) Marco Fu 10–8.
- March 22 – 24: 2017 World Seniors Championship in (England) Scunthorpe
  - (England) Peter Lines defeated (England) John Parrott 4–0.
- March 27 – April 2: 2017 China Open in Beijing
  - (England) Mark Selby defeated (Wales) Mark Williams 10–8.

April

- April 15 – May 1: 2017 World Snooker Championship in (England) Sheffield
  - (England) Mark Selby defeated (Scotland) John Higgins 18–15.

=== Women's snooker season 2016/2017 ===
- August 25 – 28, 2016: 2016 Paul Hunter Ladies Classic in (Germany) Fürth
  - (Hong Kong) Ng On Yee defeated (England) Reanne Evans, 4–1.
- October 8 – 9, 2016: 2016 UK Ladies Championship in (England) Leeds
  - (England) Reanne Evans defeated (Latvia) Tatjana Vasiljeva, 5–1.
- January 14 – 15: 2017 Women's Masters in (England) Derby
  - (England) Reanne Evans defeated (Hong Kong) So Man Yan, 4–0.
- February 18: 2017 Connie Gough Memorial Trophy in (England) Dunstable
  - (England) Maria Catalano defeated (England) Rebecca Granger, 4–2.
- March 13 – 19: 2017 World Women's Snooker Championship in (Singapore) Toa Payoh
  - (Hong Kong) Ng On Yee defeated (India) Vidya Pillai, 6–5.
- April 7 – 11: 2017 World Festival of Women's Snooker in (England) Leeds
  - (Hong Kong) Ng On Yee won the World Women's 6-Red Championship
  - (Hong Kong) Ng On Yee won the World Women's 10-Red Championship
  - (England) Emma Bonney won the World Women's Seniors Championship
  - (England) Emma Parker won the World Women's U21 Championship
  - (England) Emma Bonney & (England) Vicky Shirley won the World Women's Pairs Championship
  - (Hong Kong) Katrina Wan & (England) Sanderson Lam won the World Mixed Pairs Championship

=== Amateur snooker championships ===
- March 5 – 8: 2017 EBSA European Under-18 Snooker Championship in (Cyprus) Nicosia
  - (Wales) Jackson Page defeated (Israel) Amir Nardeia, 5–3.
- March 8 – 12: 2017 EBSA European Under-21 Snooker Championship in (Cyprus) Nicosia
  - (Switzerland) Alexander Ursenbacher defeated (Wales) Jackson Page, 6–4.
- March 13 – 19: 2017 EBSA European Snooker Championship in (Cyprus) Nicosia
  - (Scotland) Chris Totten defeated (Estonia) Andres Petrov, 7–3.
- March 15 – 18: 2017 OBSF Oceania Snooker Championship in (Australia) Albury
  - (Australia) Matthew Bolton defeated (Australia) Ben Judge, 6–3.
- April 8 – 14: 2017 ACBS Asian Under-21 Snooker Championship in (India) Chandigarh
  - (China) Yuan Sijun defeated (China) Fan Zhengyi, 6–2.
- April 12 – 14: 2017 ACBS Asian Ladies Snooker Championship (debut event) in (India) Chandigarh
  - (Hong Kong) Ng On Yee defeated (Thailand) Waratthanun Sukritthanes, 3–2.
- April 22 – 28: 2017 ACBS Asian Snooker Championship in (Qatar) Doha
  - (China) Lyu Haotian defeated (India) Pankaj Advani, 6–3.
- May 12 – 22: 2017 ABSF African Snooker Championships in (Tunisia) Hammamet
  - (Egypt) Basem Eltahhan defeated (Egypt) Wael Talaat, 6–5.
- July 8 – 11: 2017 IBSF World Under-18 Snooker Championship in (China) Beijing
  - Men: (Pakistan) Muhammad Naseem Akhtar defeated (China) Lei Peifan, 5–3.
  - Women: (Thailand) Nutcharat Wongharuthai defeated (Thailand) Siripaporn Nuanthakhamjan, 3–2.
- July 12 – 16: 2017 IBSF World Under-21 Snooker Championship in (China) Beijing
  - Men: (China) Fan Zhengyi defeated (China) Luo Honghao, 7–6.
  - Women: (Thailand) Nutcharat Wongharuthai defeated (China) Xia Yuying, 5–3.
- October 1 – 8: 2017 World Open Under-16 Snooker Championships (debut event) in (Russia) Saint Petersburg
  - Boys: (Wales) Dylan Emery defeated (Russia) Mikhail Terekhov, 4–1.
  - Girls: (India) Anupama Ramachandran defeated (India) Keerthana Pandian, 3–1.
- November 17 – 27: 2017 IBSF World Snooker Championship in (Qatar) Doha
  - Men: (India) Pankaj Advani defeated (Iran) Amir Sarkhosh, 8–2.
  - Women: (Belgium) Wendy Jans defeated (Thailand) Waratthanun Sukritthanes, 5–2.
  - Masters: (Wales) Darren Morgan defeated (India) Alok Kumar, 5–1.

== Softball ==
=== International softball championships ===
- June 25 – July 1: 2017 Women's Softball European Championship in Bollate
  - The Netherlands defeated Italy, 7–1, to win their tenth Women's Softball European Championship title.
- July 5 – 9: 2017 World Cup of Softball in Oklahoma City
  - Japan defeated the United States, 2–1, to win their second consecutive and fourth overall World Cup of Softball title.
  - Canada took third place.
- July 7 – 16: 2017 Men's Softball World Championship in Whitehorse, Yukon
  - New Zealand defeated Australia, 6–4, to win their seventh Men's Softball World Championship title.
  - Canada took third place.
- July 10 – 17: 2017 Canada Cup International Softball Championship in Surrey, British Columbia
  - For results, click here.
- July 24 – 30: 2017 Junior Women's Softball World Championship in Clearwater, Florida
  - The United States defeated Japan, 13–4, to win their second consecutive and sixth overall Junior Women's Softball World Championship title.
  - Puerto Rico took third place.

=== Little League softball tournaments ===
- July 30 – August 5: 2017 Junior League Softball World Series in (Washington (state)) Kirkland
  - (United States) Team Central ( (Ohio) Poland Community Softball Association) defeated (United States) Team Host ( (Washington (state)) Washington District 9), 7–1, in the final.
- July 30 – August 6: 2017 Senior League Softball World Series in (Delaware) Lower Sussex
  - (United States) Team Host District 3 ( (Delaware) Georgetown) defeated (Philippines) Team Asia-Pacific (Negros Occidental), 4–0, in the final.
- August 9 – 16: 2017 Little League Softball World Series in (Oregon) Portland
  - (United States) Team Southwest ( (Texas) Lake Air LL) defeated (United States) Team Southeast ( (North Carolina) Rowan LL), 7–2, in the final.

== Water skiing & wakeboarding ==
=== IWWF Championships ===
- August 15–19: IWWF Europe & Africa Wakeboard Boat Championships 2017 in Latvia
- August 18: IWWF Europe & Africa Wakeboard Superfinal 2017 in Latvia
