= 2018 in sports =

2018 in sports describes the year's events in world sport. The main events for this year were the 2018 Winter Olympics in Pyeongchang and the 2018 FIFA World Cup in Russia.

== Calendar by month ==
- February 9 – Winter Olympics: Opening ceremony is performed in Pyeongchang County in South Korea.

== Air sports ==
=== World Cups ===
Aeromodelling

- May 19 & 20: 2018 F3A Leiria World Cup in (Portugal) Leiria

Parachuting

- January 12 – 14: 2018 Paraski World Cup Series #1 in (Austria) Bad Leonfelden
  - Men's individual winner: (Germany) Reinhold Haibel
  - Women's individual winner: (Austria) Magdalena Schwertl
  - Mixed team winners: (Austria) HSV Red Bull SBG 1 (Manuel Sulzbacher, Magdalena Schwertl, Julia Schosser, Sebastian Graser)
  - Giant slalom winners: (Germany) Reinhold Haibel (m) / (Austria) Magdalena Schwertl (f)
- February 2 – 4: 2018 Paraski World Cup Series #2 in (Italy) Ponte di Legno
  - Paraski combi men's winner: (Italy) Marco Valente
  - Paraski combi women's winner: (Austria) Magdalena Schwertl
  - Paraski combi junior winner: (Austria) Sebastian Graser
  - Paraski combi master winner: (Italy) Marco Valente
  - Mixed team winners: (Austria) HSV Red Bull SBG 1 (Manuel Sulzbacher, Sebastian Graser, Magdalena Schwertl, Anton Gruber)
  - Ski winners: (Austria) Sebastian Graser (m) / (Austria) Magdalena Schwertl (f)
- February 16 – 18: 2018 Paraski World Cup Series #3 in (Slovakia) Martin
  - This event is cancelled.
- March 2 – 4: 2018 Paraski World Cup Series #4 (final) in (Czech Republic) Vrchlabí
  - Paraski combi men's winner: (Austria) Sebastian Graser
  - Paraski combi women's winner: (Austria) Magdalena Schwertl
  - Paraski combi junior winner: (Austria) Sebastian Graser
  - Paraski combi master winner: (Italy) Marco Valente
  - Mixed team winners: (Austria) HSV Red Bull SBG 1 (Manuel Sulzbacher, Sebastian Graser, Magdalena Schwertl, Anton Gruber)
  - Ski winners: (Austria) Sebastian Graser (m) / (Austria) Magdalena Schwertl (f)
- October 25 – 28: 3rd FAI World Cup of Indoor Skydiving in (Bahrain) Zallaq

=== World and Continental Championships ===
Aeromodelling

- March 19 – 22: 2018 FAI F1D World Championships for Free Flight Indoor Model Aircraft in West Baden
  - Seniors winner: (United States) Brett Sanborn
  - Juniors winner: (Ukraine) Vladyslav Klymenko
  - Seniors team winners: United States (Brett Sanborn, Jake Palmer, John Kagan)
  - Juniors team winners: France (Eliott Crosnier, Timy Reveillon, Baptiste Rompion)
- May 5 – 13: 2018 FAI F3A Asian-Oceanic Championship for Aerobatic Model Aircraft in (Philippines) Bacolod
- July 5 – 14: 2018 FAI F4 World Championships for Scale Model Aircraft in (Switzerland) Meiringen
- July 13 – 21: 2018 FAI F2 World Championships for Control Line Model Aircraft in (France) Landres
- July 15 – 21: 2018 FAI F3K European Championship for Model Gliders in (Slovakia) Martin
- July 21 – 28: 2018 FAI F3A European Championship for Aerobatic Model Aircraft in (Belgium) Grandrieu
- July 22 – 28: 2018 FAI F3J World Championship for Model Gliders in (Romania) Brașov
- July 22 – 27: 2018 FAI F5 World Championships for Electric Model Aircraft in (Japan) Takikawa
- July 23 – 30: 2018 FAI F1 European Championships for Free Flight Model Aircraft in (Hungary) Szentes
- August 5 – 11: 2018 FAI F1 Junior World Championships for Free Flight Model Aircraft in (Bulgaria) Pazardzik
- August 19 – 25: 2018 FAI F5 European Championships for Electric Model Aircraft in (Bulgaria) Dupnitsa
- August 25 – September 2: 2018 FAI S World Championships for Space Models in (Poland) Nowy Targ
- August 26 – 31: 2018 FAI F1E European Championships for Free Flight Model Aircraft in (Slovakia) Martin
- October 7 – 13: 2018 FAI F3 World Championship for Model Gliders in (Germany) Cape Arkona
- November 7 – 11: 2018 FAI World Drone Racing Championships in (China) Shenzhen

Ballooning

- February 15 – 22: 10th FAI World Hot Air Airship Championship in (Germany) Tegernsee
  - Winners: 1st: (Germany) Andreas Merk, 2nd: (Germany) Ralph Kremer, 3rd: (Germany) Juergen Huetten
- August 7 – 11: 3rd FAI Women's World Hot Air Balloon Championship in (Poland) Nałęczów
  - Winners: 1st: (Poland) Daria Dudkiewicz-Golawska, 2nd: (Lithuania) Agnė Simonavičiūtė, 3rd: (Australia) Nicola Scaife
- August 18 – 27: 23rd FAI World Hot Air Ballooning Championships in (Austria) Groß-Siegharts
  - Winners: 1st: (United Kingdom) Dominic Bareford, 2nd: (Switzerland) Stefan Zeberli, 3rd: (Russia) Sergey Latypov
- September 12 – 16: 4th FAI Junior World Hot Air Balloon Championship in (Poland) Włocławek

General aviation

=== 2018 Red Bull Air Race World Championship ===
- February 2 & 3: Air Race #1 in (United Arab Emirates) Abu Dhabi
  - Winner: (United States) Michael Goulian (Zivko Edge 540 V2)
  - Challenger winner: (Germany) Florian Bergér
- April 21 & 22: Air Race #2 in (France) Cannes
  - Winner: (Australia) Matt Hall (Zivko Edge 540 V3)
  - Challenger winner: (Sweden) Daniel Ryfa
- May 26 & 27: Air Race #3 in (Japan) Makuhari
  - Winner: (Australia) Matt Hall (Zivko Edge 540 V3)
  - Here challenger not hed.
- June 23 & 24: Air Race #4 in (Hungary) Budapest
  - Winner: (Czech Republic) Martin Šonka (Zivko Edge 540 V3)
  - Challenger winner: (Poland) Luke Czepiela
- August 4 & 5: Air Race #5 in (Japan) Makuhari
- August 26: Air Race #6 in (Russia) Kazan
  - Winner: (Czech Republic) Martin Šonka (Zivko Edge 540 V3)
  - Challenger winner: (United States) Kevin Coleman
- October 6 & 7: Air Race #7 in (United States) Indianapolis
  - Winner: (United States) Michael Goulian (Zivko Edge 540 V2)
  - Challenger winner: (Germany) Florian Bergér
- November 17 & 18 Air Race #8 (final) in (United States) Fort Worth
  - Winner: (Czech Republic) Martin Šonka (Zivko Edge 540 V3)
  - Challenger winner: (Poland) Luke Czepiela

=== World and Continental Championships ===
- August 5 – 11: 21st FAI World Rally Flying Championship in (Slovakia) Dubnica nad Váhom

Gliding

- July 8 – 21: 35th FAI World Gliding Championships in (Poland) Ostrów Wielkopolski
- July 28 – August 11: 35th FAI World Gliding Championships in (Czech Republic) Příbram

Hang gliding

- July 8 – 21: 8th FAI World Hang Gliding Class 5 Championship in (North Macedonia) Kruševo
- July 8 – 21: 20th FAI European Hang Gliding Class 1 Championship in (North Macedonia) Kruševo

Microlights & paramotors

- April 30 – May 6: 10th FAI World Paramotor Championships in (Thailand) Lopburi
  - PF1 winner: (France) Alexandre Mateos
  - PL1 winner: (Poland) Wojciech Bógdał
  - PL2 winners: France (Jean Mateos, Célia Domingues)
  - PF1 team winners: France
  - PL1 team winners: Poland
  - PL2 team winners: Poland
- October 30 – November 6: 3rd FAI World Paramotor Slalom Championships in (Egypt) Byoum Lakeside

Parachuting

- April 3 – 8: 1st CISM Para-Ski World Championship in Hochfilzen
  - Cross-country skiing winners: (Switzerland) Dario Cologna (m) / (Germany) Stefanie Böhler (f)
  - Cross-country skiing teams winners: Switzerland (Dario Cologna, Beda Klee, Jonas Baumann) (m) / Germany (Stefanie Böhler, Theresa Eichhorn, Antonia Fräbel)
  - Patrol winners: Austria (Bernhard Tritscher, Sven Grossegger, Dominik Landertinger, Simon Eder (m) / Austria (Barbara Walchhofer, Julia Schwaiger, Lisa Hauser, Katharina Innerhofer)
  - Biathlon winners: (Switzerland) Benjamin Weger (m) / (Germany) Franziska Hildebrand (f)
  - Biathlon teams winners: Austria (Dominik Landertinger, Simon Eder, Sven Grossegger) (m) / Austria (Lisa Hauser, Julia Schwaiger, Dunja Zdouc)
  - Paraski winners: (Austria) Sebastian Graser (m) / (Austria) Julia Schosser (f)
  - Paraski team winners: Austria (Hannes Kloiber, Sebastian Graser, Manuel Sulzbacher, Julia Schosser)
  - Juniors winner: (Austria) Sebastian Graser
  - Giant slalom winners: (Slovenia) Štefan Hadalin (m) / (Austria) Elisabeth Kappaurer (f)
  - Giant slalom teams winners: Germany (Bastian Meisen, Julian Rauchfuss, Sebastian Holzmann, Paul Sauter) (m) / Austria (Elisabeth Kappaurer, Elisabeth Reisinger, Stephanie Resch)
- April 11 – 14: 1st FAI European Indoor Skydiving Championships in (Norway) Voss

Artistic events indoor freestyle

  - Junior winners: 1st: Poland, 2nd: France, 3rd: Russia 2
  - Open winners: 1st: Norway, 2nd: Germany, 3rd: Latvia

Dynamic 2-way and 4-way

  - Dynamic 2-way winners: 1st: Poland 1, 2nd: France 1, 3rd: France 2
  - Dynamic 4-way winners: 1st: Norway, 2nd: France, 3rd: Czech Republic

Formation skydiving 4-way

  - Open winners: 1st: France, 2nd: Russia, 3rd: Sweden
  - Junior winners: 1st: France, 2nd: Czech Republic, 3rd: Russia
  - Women's winners: 1st: France, 2nd: United Kingdom, 3rd: Russia

Vertical formation skydiving

  - Open winners: 1st: Russia, 2nd: Poland, 3rd: Norway
- July 3 – 7: 7th FAI World Canopy Piloting Championships in (Poland) Wrocław
- August 10 – 21: 42nd CISM World Military Parachuting Championship in (Hungary) Szolnok
- August 25 – 30: 35th FAI World Freefall Style and Accuracy Landing Championships in (Bulgaria) Montana
- August 25 – 30: 9th FAI Junior World Freefall Style and Accuracy Landing Championships in (Bulgaria) Montana
- August 26 – 31: 2nd FAI World Wingsuit Flying Championships in (Czech Republic) Prostějov
  - Performance Wingsuit Flying winners: 4. (Norway) Espen Fadnes, 2. (United States) Chris Geiler, 3. (Russia) Dmitry Podoryashy
  - Wingsuit Acrobatic Flying winners: 1. Russia 1, 2. United States, 3. Russia 2
- October 6 – 13: 18th FAI World Canopy Formation Championships in (Australia) Gold Coast
- October 6 – 13: 23rd FAI World Formation Skydiving Championships in (Australia) Gold Coast
- October 6 – 13: 2nd FAI World Speed Skydiving Championships in (Australia) Gold Coast
- October 6 – 13: 12th FAI World Artistic Events championships in (Australia) Gold Coast

Paragliding

- March 30 – April 7: 3rd FAI Pan-American Paragliding Championship in Baixo Guandu
  - Men's individual winners: 1st: (Brazil) Jeison Zeferino Brito, 2nd: (Brazil) Leandro Henrique Padua, 3rd: (Argentina) Michel Guillemot
  - Team winners: 1st: Colombia, 2nd: Brazil, 3rd: Venezuela
  - Women's winners: 1st: (Brazil) Priscila Fevereiro, 2nd: (Colombia) Andrea Jaramillo Jaramillo, 3rd: (Argentina) Shauin Kao
- April 6 – 12: 1st FAI Asian-Oceanic Paragliding Accuracy Championships in Lopburi
  - Individual R11 winners: 1st: (China) Jianwei Wang, 2nd: (Thailand) Tanapat Luangiam, 3rd: (China) Hongji Wang
  - Team R11 winners: 1st: Thailand, 2nd: China, 3rd: Chinese Taipei
  - Women's winners: 1st: (Thailand) Chantika Chaisanuk, 2nd: (China) Jingwen Long, 3rd: (Thailand) Nunnapat Phuchong
- July 14 – 28: 15th FAI European Paragliding Championship in (Portugal) Montalegre
  - Overall winner: (United Kingdom) Theo Warden
  - Women's winner: (France) Seiko Fukuoka Naville
  - Teams winners: Spain (Xevi Bonet Dalmau, Sergi Claret Estupinya, Felix Rodriguez Fernández, Francisco Javier Reina)
- September 16 – 22: 6th FAI European Paragliding Accuracy Championship in (Slovenia) Kobarid

Power and glider aerobatics

- August 3 – 12: 21st FAI World Glider Aerobatic Championships in (Czech Republic) Zbraslavice
  - Individual unlimited winner: (Hungary) Ferenc Tóth
  - Team unlimited winners: Germany (Moritz Kirchberg, Eugen Schaal, Eberhard Holl)
- August 3 – 12: 9th FAI World Advanced Glider Aerobatic Championships in Zbraslavice
  - Individual advanced winner: (Switzerland) Jonas Langenegger
  - Team advanced winners: Czech Republic (Tomáš Bartoň, Josef Rejent, Aleš Ferra)
- August 16 – 26: 13th FAI World Advanced Aerobatic Championships in (Romania) Strejnicu
  - Free known winner: (Russia) Dmitry Samokhvalov
  - Free unknown ~1 winner: (Russia) Roman Ovchinnikov
  - Free unknown ~2 winner: (United States) Aaron McCartan
  - Free unknown ~3 winner: (Russia) Roman Ovchinnikov
  - Team winners: France
  - Individual winners: (Russia) Roman Ovchinnikov
- September 8 – 15: 21st FAI European Aerobatic Championships in (Czech Republic) Jindřichův Hradec

Rotorcraft

- July 24 – 29: 16th FAI World Helicopter Championship in Minsk
  - Navigation winners: Poland (Marcin Szamborski & Michał Szamborski)
  - Parallel precision flying winners: Russia (Andrey Orekhov & Vadim Sazonov)
  - Parallel fender rigging winners: Belarus (Uladzimir Buhayeu & Andrei Rogonov)
  - Parallel slalom winners: Russia (Maxim Sotnikov & Aleh Puajukas)
  - Team overall winners: Russia

== American football ==
- Super Bowl LII – the Philadelphia Eagles (NFC) won 41–33 over the New England Patriots (AFC)
  - Location: U.S. Bank Stadium
  - Attendance: 67,612
  - MVP: Nick Foles, QB (Philadelphia)

== Archery ==
=== 2017–18 Indoor Archery World Cup & World Championships ===
- November 10 – 12, 2017: IA World Cup #1 in (Morocco) Marrakesh
  - Recurve winners: (Italy) Matteo Fissore (m) / (Mexico) Aída Román (f)
  - Compound winners: (United States) Braden Gellenthien (m) / (United Kingdom) Sarah Prieels (f)
  - Junior recurve winners: (Netherlands) Jonah Wilthagen (m) / (Denmark) Lena Agerholm (f)
  - Women's Junior compound winner: (Belgium) Dalila-Warda Amani
- December 2 & 3, 2017: IA World Cup #2 in (Thailand) Bangkok
  - Recurve winners: (South Korea) Kim Bong-man (m) / (South Korea) SIM Ye-ji (f)
  - Compound winners: (Netherlands) Mike Schloesser (m) / (United States) Paige Pearce-Gore (f)
- January 19 – 21: IA World Cup #3 in (France) Nîmes
  - Recurve winners: (Netherlands) Steve Wijler (m) / (South Korea) KIM Su-rin (f)
  - Compound winners: (United States) Kristofer Schaff (m) / (Russia) Natalie Avdeeva (f)
- February 9 & 10: IA World Cup #4 (final) in (United States) Las Vegas
  - Recurve winners: (Netherlands) Steve Wijler (m) / (Germany) Lisa Unruh (f)
  - Compound winners: (United States) Jesse Broadwater (m) / (United States) Danielle Reynolds (f)
- February 14 – 19: 2018 World Indoor Archery Championships in Yankton, South Dakota
  - Recurve winners: (Netherlands) Sjef van den Berg (m) / (Germany) Elena Richter (f)
  - Junior recurve winners: (Ukraine) Ivan Kozhokar (m) / (Russia) Ariuna Budaeva (f)
  - Compound winners: (Netherlands) Mike Schloesser (m) / (Russia) Natalia Avdeeva (f)
  - Junior compound winners: (Denmark) Simon Olsen (m) / (United States) Cassidy Cox (f)
  - Team recurve winners: Netherlands (m) / Germany (f)
  - Junior team recurve winners: Iran (m) / Italy (f)
  - Team compound winners: United States (m) / United States (f)
  - Junior team compound winners: United States (m) / United States (f)

=== 2018 Outdoor Archery World Cup, Continental, & World Championships ===
- April 24 – 29: WA World Cup #1 in (China) Shanghai
  - Recurve winners: (South Korea) Kim Woo-jin (m) / (South Korea) Chang Hye-jin (f)
  - Compound winners: (South Korea) KIM Jong-ho (m) / (Colombia) Sara López (f)
  - Team recurve winners: South Korea (m) / South Korea (f)
  - Team compound winners: United States (m) / Russia (f)
  - Mixed winners: South Korea (Recurve) / Denmark (Compound)
- May 20 – 26: WA World Cup #2 in (Turkey) Antalya
  - Recurve winners: (South Korea) Lee Woo-seok (m) / (Russia) Ksenia Perova (f)
  - Compound winners: (Netherlands) Mike Schloesser (m) / (Turkey) Yeşim Bostan (f)
  - Team recurve winners: South Korea (m) / South Korea (f)
  - Team compound winners: South Korea (m) / Chinese Taipei (f)
  - Mixed winners: Japan (Recurve) / France (Compound)
- June 19 – 24: WA World Cup #3 in Salt Lake City
  - Recurve winners: (Italy) Mauro Nespoli (m) / (India) Deepika Kumari (f)
  - Compound winners: (Denmark) Stephan Hansen (m) / (Colombia) Sara López (f)
  - Team recurve winners: Netherlands (m) / Chinese Taipei (f)
  - Team compound winners: United States (m) / Colombia (f)
  - Mixed winners: United States (Recurve) / France (Compound)
- July 16 – 22: WA World Cup #4 in (Germany) Berlin
  - Recurve winners: (Turkey) Mete Gazoz (m) / (South Korea) Lee Eun-kyung (f)
  - Compound winners: (Netherlands) Mike Schloesser (m) / (France) Sophie Dodemont (f)
  - Team recurve winners: Chinese Taipei (m) / South Korea (f)
  - Team compound winners: Croatia (m) / France (f)
  - Mixed winners: Chinese Taipei (Recurve) / United States (Compound)
- August 14 – 19: 2018 Pan American Archery Championships in Medellín
  - Recurve winners: (Mexico) Ernesto Boardman (m) / (Mexico) Alejandra Valencia (f)
  - Compound winners: (Mexico) Antonio Hidalgo (m) / (Colombia) Sara López (f)
  - Team recurve winners: United States (m) / United States (f)
  - Team compound winners: Colombia (m) / Mexico (f)
  - Mixed winners: United States (Recurve) / United States (Compound)
- August 27 – September 1: 2018 European Archery Championships in (Poland) Legnica
  - Recurve winners: (Netherlands) Steve Wijler (m) / (Turkey) Yasemin Anagöz (f)
  - Compound winners: (Russia) Anton Bulaev (m) / (Spain) Andrea Marcos (f)
  - Team recurve winners: Russia (m) / Turkey (f)
  - Team compound winners: Great Britain (m) / Turkey (f)
  - Mixed winners: Italy (Recurve) / France (Compound)
- September 4 – 9: 2018 World Field Archery Championships in (Italy) Cortina d'Ampezzo
  - Recurve winners: (Japan) Wataru Oonuki (m) / (Germany) Lisa Unruh (f)
  - Compound winners: (Netherlands) Mike Schloesser (m) / (United States) Paige Pearce (f)
  - Barebow winners: (Sweden) Erik Jonsson (m) / (Sweden) Lina Bjorklund (f)
  - Junior recurve winners: (United Kingdom) William Pike (m) / (Italy) Aiko Rolando (f)
  - Junior compound winners: (Luxembourg) Timo Bega (m) / (Italy) Sara Ret (f)
  - Junior Barebow winners: (Italy) Eric Esposito (m) / (Italy) Natalia Trunfio (f)
  - Team winners: Germany (m) / Germany (f)
  - Junior team winners: United States (m) / Sweden (f)
- September 29 & 30: WA World Cup #5 (final) in Samsun
  - Recurve winners: (South Korea) Kim Woo-jin (m) / (South Korea) Lee Eun-kyung (f)
  - Compound winners: (United States) Kris Schaff (m) / (Colombia) Sara López (f)
  - Mixed team winners: South Korea (Recurve) / Turkey (Compound)

== Baseball ==
=== Major League Baseball ===
- March 29 – September 30: 2018 Major League Baseball season
  - American League 2018 Season winners: (Massachusetts) Boston Red Sox
  - National League 2018 Season winners: (California) Los Angeles Dodgers
- June 4 – 6: 2018 Major League Baseball draft in Secaucus, New Jersey
  - #1 pick: (Alabama) Casey Mize (to the (Michigan) Detroit Tigers from the (Alabama) Auburn Tigers)
- July 17: 2018 Major League Baseball All-Star Game in (Washington, D.C.) Washington D.C. at Nationals Park
  - The American League defeated the National League, 8–6.
  - MVP: (New Mexico) Alex Bregman ( (Texas) Houston Astros)
  - 2018 Major League Baseball Home Run Derby Winner: (Nevada) Bryce Harper ( (Washington, D.C.) Washington Nationals)
- October 23 – 28: 2018 World Series
  - The (Massachusetts) Boston Red Sox defeated the (California) Los Angeles Dodgers, 4–1 in games played, to win their ninth World Series title.

=== 2018 Little League Baseball World Series ===
- July 28 – August 4: 2018 Senior League Baseball World Series in (South Carolina) Easley at Easley Recreation Complex
  - The (Curaçao) Pariba Little League (Caribbean) defeated the (Delaware) Naamans Little League (East), 7–2, in the final.
- July 29 – August 5: 2018 Little League Intermediate (50/70) Baseball World Series in (California) Livermore at Max Baer Park
  - The (South Korea) West Seoul LL (Asia-Pacific) defeated the (California) Livermore/Granada LL (Host), 10–0, in the final.
- August 12 – 19: 2018 Junior League World Series in (Michigan) Taylor at Heritage Park
  - The (Chinese Taipei) Shing-Ming Junior LL (Asia-Pacific) defeated the (Texas) Lufkin LL (Southwest), 2–0, in the final.
- August 16 – 26: 2018 Little League World Series in (Pennsylvania) South Williamsport at both the Little League Volunteer Stadium and the Howard J. Lamade Stadium
  - The (Hawaii) Honolulu LL (West) defeated the (South Korea) South Seoul LL (Asia-Pacific and Middle East), 3–0, in the final.

=== Baseball world events ===
- July 6 – 15: 2018 World University Baseball Championship in (Taiwan) Chiayi
  - Japan defeated Chinese Taipei, 8–3, in the final. South Korea took third place.
- August 10 – 19: 2018 U-15 Baseball World Cup in David & Chitré
  - United States defeated Panama, 7–1, to win their sixth U-15 Baseball World Cup title.
  - Chinese Taipei took third place.
- August 22 – 31: 2018 Women's Baseball World Cup in (United States) Viera, Florida
  - Japan defeated Chinese Taipei, 6–0, to win their sixth consecutive Women's Baseball World Cup title.
  - Canada took third place.
- October 19 – 28: 2018 U-23 Baseball World Cup in (Colombia) Barranquilla & Montería
  - Mexico defeated Japan, 2–1, to win their first U–23 Baseball World Cup title.
  - Venezuela took third place.

== Basketball ==
=== FIBA World events ===
- June 8 – 12: 2018 FIBA 3x3 World Cup in (Philippines) Bocaue
  - Team winners: Serbia (m) / Italy (f)
  - Skills Contest winner: (Hungary) Alexandra Theodorean
  - Dunk Contest winner: (Ukraine) Dmytro Krivenko
  - Shoot-out Contest winner: (Philippines) Janine Pontejos
- June 30 – July 8: 2018 FIBA Under-17 Basketball World Cup in (Argentina) Rosario and Santa Fe
  - The United States defeated France, 95–52, to win their fifth consecutive FIBA Under-17 Basketball World Cup title.
  - Puerto Rico took third place.
- July 21 – 29: 2018 FIBA Under-17 Women's Basketball World Cup in (Belarus) Minsk
  - The United States defeated France, 92–40, to win their fourth FIBA Under-17 Women's Basketball World Cup title.
  - Australia took third place.
- September 22 – 30: 2018 FIBA Women's Basketball World Cup in Tenerife
  - The United States defeated Australia, 73–56, to win their third consecutive and tenth overall FIBA Women's Basketball World Cup title.
  - Spain took third place.

=== National Basketball Association ===
- October 17, 2017 – April 11, 2018: 2017–18 NBA season
  - The (Canada) Toronto Raptors clinched home court advantage for the Eastern Conference playoffs.
  - The (Texas) Houston Rockets clinched home court advantage for the entire playoffs.
  - Top Scorer: (California) James Harden (Houston Rockets)
- February 18: 2018 NBA All-Star Game at the Staples Center in (United States) Los Angeles
  - All-Star Game: Team LeBron defeated Team Stephen, 148–145.
  - MVP: (Ohio) LeBron James ( (Ohio) Cleveland Cavaliers)
  - NBA All-Star Weekend Celebrity Game: Team Clippers defeated Team Lakers, 75–66.
  - Rising Stars Challenge: (United Nations) Team World defeated (United States) Team USA, 155–124.
  - NBA All-Star Weekend Skills Challenge winner: (California) Spencer Dinwiddie ( (New York (state)) Brooklyn Nets)
  - Three-Point Contest winner: (Michigan) Devin Booker ( (Arizona) Phoenix Suns)
  - Slam Dunk Contest winner: (New York (state)) Donovan Mitchell ( Utah Jazz)
- April 14 – June 8: 2018 NBA Playoffs
  - The (California) Golden State Warriors defeated the (Ohio) Cleveland Cavaliers, 4–0 in games played, to win their third of four consecutive and sixth overall NBA title.
- June 21: 2018 NBA draft in (New York (state)) Brooklyn at Barclays Center
  - #1: (The Bahamas) Deandre Ayton (to the Phoenix Suns from the Arizona Wildcats)

=== Women's National Basketball Association ===
- April 12: 2018 WNBA draft in (New York (state)) Nike New York Headquarters (New York City)
  - #1 pick: A'ja Wilson to the (Nevada) Las Vegas Aces from the South Carolina Gamecocks
- May 18 – August 19: 2018 WNBA season
  - Western Conference winners: (Washington (state)) Seattle Storm
  - Eastern Conference winners: (Georgia (U.S. state)) Atlanta Dream
  - MVP: (New York (state)) Breanna Stewart ( (Washington (state)) Seattle Storm)
- July 28: 2018 WNBA All-Star Game in Minneapolis at Target Center
  - Team Parker defeated Team Delle Donne, 119–112.
  - MVP: (Missouri) Maya Moore ( Minnesota Lynx)
  - Three Point Shootout winner: (Illinois) Allie Quigley ( (Illinois) Chicago Sky)
- August 21 – September 12: 2018 WNBA Playoffs
  - The (Washington (state)) Seattle Storm defeated the (Washington, D.C.) Washington Mystics, 3–0 in games played, to win their third WNBA title.

=== National Collegiate Athletic Association ===
- March 13 – April 2: 2018 NCAA Division I men's basketball tournament
  - The (Pennsylvania) Villanova Wildcats defeated the Michigan Wolverines 79–62 to win their second NCAA title in three years and third overall.
- March 16 – April 1: 2018 NCAA Division I women's basketball tournament
  - The (Indiana) Notre Dame Fighting Irish defeated the Mississippi State Bulldogs 61–58 to win their second NCAA title.

=== 2018 FIBA 3x3 World Tour ===
- July 21 & 22: Saskatoon Masters in Canada
  - (Serbia) Novi Sad defeated fellow Serbian team, Liman, 20–18, in the final.
- July 28 & 29: Utsunomiya Masters in Japan
  - (Serbia) Liman defeated (Netherlands) Amsterdam, 18–11, in the final.
- August 4 & 5: Prague Masters in the Czech Republic
  - (Serbia) Novi Sad defeated (Russia) Gagarin, 21–12, in the final.
- August 24 & 25: Lausanne Masters in Switzerland
  - (Serbia) Novi Sad defeated fellow Serbian team, Liman, 21–20, in the final.
- August 30 & 31: Debrecen Masters in Hungary
  - (Serbia) Novi Sad defeated (Latvia) Riga, 21–10, in the final.
- September 8 & 9: Mexico City Masters in Mexico
  - (Slovenia) Ljubljana defeated (Puerto Rico) Ponce, 21–17, in the final.
- September 22 & 23: Hyderabad Masters in India
  - (Serbia) Novi Sad defeated fellow Serbian team, Liman, 21–16, in the final.
- September 29 & 30: Chengdu Masters in China
  - (Serbia) Liman defeated (Latvia) Riga, 21–12, in the final.
- October 13 & 14: Penang Masters in Malaysia
  - (Serbia) Liman defeated (Slovenia) Piran, 21–15, in the final.
- October 27 & 28: Beijing Masters (final) in China
  - (Serbia) Novi Sad defeated (Latvia) Riga, 20–18, in the final.

=== FIBA Americas ===
- January 19 – March 25: 2018 FIBA Americas League
  - (Argentina) San Lorenzo defeated (Brazil) Mogi das Cruzes, 79–71, to win their first FIBA Americas League title.
  - (Argentina) Regatas Corrientes took third place.
- June 11 – 16: 2018 FIBA Under-18 Americas Championship in St. Catharines
  - The United States defeated Canada, 113–74, to win their fifth consecutive and ninth overall FIBA Under-18 Americas Championship title.
  - Argentina took third place.
- August 1 – 7: 2018 FIBA Under-18 Women's Americas Championship in Mexico City
  - The United States defeated Canada, 84–60, to win their ninth consecutive and tenth overall FIBA Under-18 Women's Americas Championship title.
  - Argentina took third place.

=== FIBA Europe ===
==== 2018 European Championships ====
- June 26 – July 1: 2018 FIBA European Championship for Small Countries in (San Marino) Serravalle
  - Malta defeated Norway, 76–59, to win their first FIBA European Championship for Small Countries title.
  - Ireland took third place.
- June 26 – July 1: 2018 FIBA Women's European Championship for Small Countries in (Republic of Ireland) Cork
  - Denmark defeated Luxembourg, 93–59, in the final. Malta took third place.
- July 7 – 15: 2018 FIBA Europe Under-20 Championship for Women in (Hungary) Sopron
  - Spain defeated Serbia, 69–50, to win their fourth consecutive and eighth overall FIBA Europe Under-20 Championship for Women title.
  - Netherlands took third place.
- July 14 – 22: 2018 FIBA Europe Under-20 Championship in Chemnitz
  - Israel defeated Croatia, 80–66, to win their first FIBA Europe Under-20 Championship title.
  - Germany took third place.
- July 28 – August 5: 2018 FIBA Europe Under-18 Championship in Ventspils, Liepāja, & Riga
  - Serbia defeated Latvia, 99–90, to win their second consecutive and fourth overall FIBA Europe Under-18 Championship title.
  - France took third place.
- August 4 – 12: 2018 FIBA Under-18 Women's European Championship in (Italy) Udine
  - Germany defeated Spain, 67–54, to win their first FIBA Under-18 Women's European Championship title.
  - Hungary took third place.
  - Note: All teams mentioned above, along with Latvia and Belgium, have qualified to compete at the 2019 FIBA Under-19 Women's Basketball World Cup.
- August 10 – 18: 2018 FIBA Europe Under-16 Championship in (Serbia) Novi Sad
  - Croatia defeated Spain, 71–70, to win their fourth FIBA Europe Under-16 Championship title.
  - Turkey took third place.
- August 17 – 25: 2018 FIBA Europe Under-16 Championship for Women in (Lithuania) Kaunas
  - Italy defeated the Czech Republic, 60–52, to win their first FIBA Europe Under-16 Championship for Women title.
  - Spain took third place.
- August 31 – September 2: 2018 FIBA Europe Under-18 3x3 Championships in Debrecen
  - Men: Hungary defeated Serbia, 20–18, to win their first Men's FIBA Europe Under-18 3x3 Championships title.
    - Spain took third place.
  - Women: Belgium defeated France, 12–4, to win their first Women's FIBA Europe Under-18 3x3 Championships title.
    - Russia took third place.
- September 14 – 16: 2018 FIBA 3x3 Europe Cup in (Romania) Bucharest
  - Men: Serbia defeated Latvia, 19–18, to win their first Men's FIBA 3x3 Europe Cup title.
    - Slovenia took third place.
  - Women: France defeated Netherlands, 21–5, to win their first Women's FIBA 3x3 Europe Cup title.
    - Ukraine took third place.

==== 2017–18 European Leagues ====
- September 15, 2017 – April 3: 2017–18 Alpe Adria Cup
  - (Slovenia) KK Zlatorog Laško defeated (Slovakia) Levicki Patrioti 89–79 to win their first Alpe Adria Cup title.
- September 19, 2017 – May 6: 2017–18 Basketball Champions League
  - (Greece) AEK Athens defeated (France) Monaco 100–94 to win their first Basketball Champions League title.
  - (Spain) UCAM Murcia took third place.
- September 20, 2017 – April 18: 2017–18 EuroCup Women
  - (Turkey) Galatasaray defeated (Italy) Umana Reyer Venezia 155–140 in the two-legged final to win their second EuroCup Women title.
- September 20, 2017 – May 2: 2017–18 FIBA Europe Cup
  - (Italy) Umana Reyer Venezia defeated fellow Italian team Sidigas Avellino 158–148 in the two-legged final to win their first FIBA Europe Cup title.
- September 26, 2017 – April 22: 2017–18 EuroLeague Women
  - (Russia) UMMC Ekaterinburg defeated (Hungary) Sopron Basket 72–53 to win their fourth EuroLeague Women title.
  - (Russia) Dynamo Kursk took third place.
- October 4, 2017 – March 25: 2017–18 WABA League
  - (Montenegro) Budućnost Bemax defeated (Slovenia) Athlete Celje, 71–68, to win their second WABA League title.
  - (Bulgaria) WBC Montana 2003 took third place.
- October 10, 2017 – April 4: 2017–18 ABA League Second Division (debut event)
  - (Slovenia) KK Krka defeated fellow Slovenian team, KK Primorska, 87–73, to win the inaugural ABA League Second Division title.
- October 10, 2017 – April 15: 2017–18 BIBL season
  - (Bulgaria) Levski defeated (Kosovo) Bashkimi, 83–72, to win their third BIBL title.
  - (Bulgaria) BC Rilski Sportist took third place.
- October 10, 2017 – April 16: 2017–18 EuroCup Basketball
  - (Turkey) Darüşşafaka S.K. defeated (Russia) PBC Lokomotiv Kuban, 148–137 in two matches, to win their first EuroCup Basketball title.
- October 12, 2017 – May 20: 2017–18 EuroLeague (Final Four in (Serbia) Belgrade)
  - (Spain) Real Madrid defeated (Turkey) Fenerbahçe Doğuş, 85–80, to win their tenth EuroLeague title.
  - (Lithuania) BC Žalgiris took third place.
- October 18, 2017 – March 4: 2017–18 Central Europe Women's League
  - (Germany) BC Pharmaserv Marburg defeated (Romania) CSM Satu Mare, 69–60, to win their first Central Europe Women's League title.
  - (Romania) Olimpia CSU Brașov took third place.
- October 24, 2017 – April 5: 2017–18 Baltic Basketball League
  - (Lithuania) BC Pieno žvaigždės defeated (Latvia) BK Jūrmala, 174–148 in the final's two legs, to win their first Baltic Basketball League title.
  - (Estonia) BC Tartu took third place.

=== FIBA Asia ===
National teams

- April 29 – May 1: 2018 FIBA 3x3 Asia Cup in Shenzhen
  - Men: Australia defeated Mongolia, 17–16, in the final. Japan took third place.
  - Women: New Zealand defeated China, 14–11, in the final. Australia took third place.
- August 5 – 11: 2018 FIBA Under-18 Asian Championship in Thailand
  - In the final, Australia defeated New Zealand, 73–62, to win their 1st title.
  - China took third place.
  - Note: All teams mentioned here, plus Philippines, have qualified to compete at the 2019 FIBA Under-19 Basketball World Cup.
- October 28 – November 3: 2018 FIBA Under-18 Women's Asian Championship in (India) Bangalore
  - China defeated Japan, 89–76, to win their fifth consecutive and 16th overall FIBA Under-18 Women's Asian Championship title.
  - Australia took third place.
  - Note: All teams mentioned here, plus South Korea, have qualified to compete at the 2019 FIBA Under-19 Women's Basketball World Cup.

Clubs teams

- November 17, 2017 – May 2: 2017–18 ABL season
  - (Philippines) San Miguel Alab Pilipinas defeated (Thailand) Mono Vampire, 3–2 in games played in a 5-legged final, to win their first ABL title.
- July 17 – 22: Summer Super 8 in Macau
  - (China) Guangzhou Long-Lions defeated (South Korea) Seoul Samsung Thunders, 78–72, to win their first title.
  - (South Korea) Incheon Electroland Elephants took third place.

=== FIBA Africa ===
- August 10 – 19: 2018 FIBA Under-18 Women's African Championship in Maputo
  - Mali defeated Mozambique, 86–33, to win their third consecutive and seventh overall FIBA Under-18 Women's African Championship title.
  - Angola took third place.
- August 24 – September 2: 2018 FIBA Under-18 African Championship in Bamako
  - Mali defeated Senegal, 78–76, to win their first FIBA Africa Under-18 Championship title.
  - Egypt took third place.

=== FIBA Oceania ===
- December 2 – 8: 2018 FIBA U15 Oceania Championship for Men & Women in (Papua New Guinea) Port Moresby
  - Men: Australia defeated New Zealand, 61–58, in the final. Samoa took third place.
  - Women: Australia defeated New Zealand, 110–30, in the final. Samoa took third place.

== Bowls ==
=== World Tour ===
- November 4 – 11, 2017: The Co-op Funeralcare Scottish International Open 2017 in Perth, Scotland
  - In the final, (Scotland) David Gourlay defeated (Scotland) Michael Stepney, 7,11 – 4,9.
- January 12 – 28: 2018 World Indoor Bowls Championship in (England) Hopton-on-Sea
  - Open Singles: (England) Mark Dawes defeated (England) Robert Paxton, 8–7, 6–7, 2–0.
  - Women's singles: (England) Katherine Rednall defeated (England) Rebecca Field, 13–6, 13–6.
  - Open Pairs: (England) Jamie Chestney & (England) Mark Dawes defeated (England) Nick Brett & (England) Greg Harlow, 6–6, 9–5.
  - Mixed Pairs: (England) Jamie Chestney & (Scotland) Lesley Doig defeated (Scotland) Darren Burnett & (England) Rebecca Field, 8–4, 7–6.
- March 3 – 9: The Co-op Funeralcare International Open 2018 in (England) Blackpool
  - In the final, (Scotland) David Gourlay defeated (England) Greg Harlow, 11,9 – 5,9, 2–1.
- The Co-op Funeralcare European Masters 2018

=== World Cup ===
- March 6 – 14: 2018 World Cup in Australia

=== World and International Championships ===
- February 24 – March 2: World Youth Bowls Championships in Broadbeach
  - Men's: Australia 1 defeated Wales, 21–12.
  - Women's: Australia 2 defeated New Zealand 1, 21–13.
  - Mixed Pairs: Australia 1 defeated Norfolk Island & Scotland, 20–5.
- October 28 – November 4: World Singles Champion of Champions in (Australia) St Johns Park, New South Wales
  - Men's: (New Zealand) Shannon McIlroy defeated (Hong Kong) Tony Cheung, 8–3, 9–2.
  - Women's: (New Zealand) Jo Edwards defeated (Malaysia) Alyani Jamil, 10–7, 10–3.

== Bridge ==
=== Europe ===
- February 2 – 4: 7th International Barcelona Bridge Open in (Spain) Barcelona
  - Winners: (Portugal) Antonio Palma & (Italy) Massimiliano Di Franco
- February 17 – 23: 2nd European Winter Games in (Monaco) Monte Carlo
  - Winners: (Norway) Team Mahaffey (Boye Brogeland, Espen Lindqvist, Zia Mahmood, Jeff Meckstroth)
- March 2 – 4: Slava Cup in (Russia) Moscow
  - Winners: (Bulgaria) Diyan Danailov & (Bulgaria) Rossen Gunev
- June 6 – 16: 54th European Team Championships in (Belgium) Ostend
- July 11 – 18: 14th Youth Pairs Championships in (Croatia) Opatija

=== Asia-Pacific ===
- April 14 – 20: 2018 APBF Open Youth Championships in (Indonesia) Jakarta
  - U26 winners: (Indonesia) Airlangga University
  - U21 winners: High School Affiliated to Renmin University of China
- June 4 – 10: 3rd Asia Cup Bridge Championships in (India) Goa

=== Other in Bridge ===
- May 10 – 23: 68th South American Bridge Festival in (Brazil) Comandatuba
- August 9 – 18: 17th World Youth Bridge Team Championships in (China) Wujiang
- September 22 – October 6: 11th World Bridge Series in (United States) Orlando
- October 25 – 28: 9th World University Bridge Championship in (China) Suzhou

== Canadian football ==
- November 25 – 106th Grey Cup: Calgary Stampeders defeat Ottawa Redblacks, 27–16.

== Cheerleading ==
=== Open ===
- January 27 & 28: Winter Open in (Norway) Drammen
  - For all results, click here. and here.

=== World and Continental Championships ===
- April 25 – 27: 2018 Junior World Cheerleading Championships and World Cheerleading Championships in Orlando
  - United States won both the gold and overall medal tallies.
- June 30 & July 1: ECU European Cheerleading Championships in (Finland) Helsinki
- October 5 & 6: 1st World University Cheerleading Championships in (Poland) Łódź

== Chess ==
=== World Events ===
- March 10 – 28: Candidates Tournament 2018 in (Germany) Berlin
  - Winner: (United States) Fabiano Caruana
- April 20 – 29: World Schools Individual Championships 2018 in (Albania) Durrës
  - U7 winners: (Kazakhstan) Dinmukhammed Tulendinov (m) / (India) Lakshana Subramanian (f)
  - U9 winners: (Russia) Savva Vetokhin (m) / (United Arab Emirates) Alserkal Rouda Essa (f)
  - U11 winners: (Mongolia) Lkhagvajamts Ochirbat (m) / (Kazakhstan) Alua Nurmanova (f)
  - U13 winners: Momchil Petkov (m) / (Mongolia) Davaakhuu Munkhzul (f)
  - U15 winners: (Kazakhstan) Arystan Isanzhulov (m) / (Kazakhstan) Nazerke Nurgali (f)
  - U17 winners: (Azerbaijan) Murad Ibrahimli (m) / Viktoria Radeva (f)
- April 21 – 30: 2018 World Amateur Chess Championship in (Italy) Cagliari
  - Under2300 winner: (India) Arvinder Preet Singh
  - Under2000 winner: (Azerbaijan) Kanan Hajiyev
  - Under1700 winners: (Turkey) Batuhan Sütbaş (m) / (Russia) Vilena Popova (f)
- May 2 – May 20: Women's World Chess Championship Match 2018 in (China) Chongqing and (China) Shanghai
  - Winner: (China) Ju Wenjun
- June 21 – 25: 2018 World Cadets U8, U10, U12 Rapid & Blitz Chess Championships in (Belarus) Minsk
  - Blitz U8 winners: (Uzbekistan) Khumoyun Begmuratov (m) / (Belarus) Ekaterina Zubkovskaya (f)
  - Blitz U10 winners: (Ukraine) Tykhon Cherniaiev (m) / (Uzbekistan) Afruza Khamdamova (f)
  - Blitz U12 winners: (Russia) Leonid Girshgorn (m) / (Uzbekistan) Umida Omonova (f)
  - Rapid U8 winners: (Uzbekistan) Khumoyun Begmuratov (m) / (Russia) Varvara Kuzmina (f)
  - Rapid U10 winners: (Ukraine) Tykhon Cherniaiev (m) / (Indonesia) Samantha Edithso (f)
  - Rapid U12 winners: (Iran) Bardiya Daneshvar (m) / (Uzbekistan) Umida Omonova (f)
- July 7 – 15: 2018 World Team Chess Championship 50+, 65+ in (Germany) Radebeul
- September 4 – 16: World Junior Chess Championship and Girls U20 in (Turkey) Gebze
  - Winners: (Iran) Parham Maghsoodloo (m) / (Russia) Aleksandra Maltsevskaya (f)
- September 23 – October 6: 43rd Chess Olympiad in (Georgia (country)) Batumi
- October 19 – November 1: 2018 World Youth U14, U16, U18 Championships in (Greece) Chalkidiki
- November 3 – 16: 2018 World Cadets U8, U10, U12 Championships in (Spain) Santiago de Compostela
- November 9 – 28: World Chess Championship 2018 in (England) London
  - Winner: (Norway) Magnus Carlsen
- November 17 – 30: 2018 World Senior Chess Championship in (Slovenia) Bled
  - 65+ Winners: (Czech Republic) Vlastimil Jansa (m) / (Georgia (country)) Nona Gaprindashvili (f)
  - 50+ Winners: (Armenia) Karen Movsziszian (m) / (Luxembourg) Elvira Berend (f)
- November 24 – December 3: 2018 World Youth U-16 Chess Olympiad in (Turkey) Manavgat
  - Winner: Uzbekistan
- Women's World Chess Championship 2018 in (Russia) Khanty-Mansiysk
  - Winner: (China) Ju Wenjun
- World Cities Team Championship 2018 in United Arab Emirates

=== European Events ===
- March 16 – 29: European Individual Chess Championship in (Georgia (country)) Batumi
  - Winner: (Croatia) Ivan Šarić
- March 29 – April 2: European Women's Rapid Championship and European Women's Blitz Championship in (Georgia (country)) Batumi
  - Rapid winner: (Germany) Elisabeth Pähtz
  - Blitz winner: (Ukraine) Anna Muzychuk
- April 7 – 20: European Individual Chess Championship for Women in (Slovakia) Vysoké Tatry
  - Winner: (Russia) Valentina Gunina
- April 13 – 23: European Senior Team Chess Championship in (Poland) Wałbrzych
  - 50+ winners: Italy
  - 65+ winners: Russia
- June 13 – 21: European Amateur Chess Championship in (Montenegro) Budva
- June 29 – July 8: European School Chess Championship in (Poland) Kraków
- July 11 – 19: European Youth Team Championship in (Germany) Bad Blankenburg
- July 31 – August 5: European Youth Rapid and Blitz Championships in (Romania) Oradea
- August 3 – 13: European Senior Chess Championship in (Norway) Drammen
- August 19 – 30: European Youth Chess Championship U8-U18 in (Latvia) Riga
- October 13 – 21: European Chess Club Cup for Men and Women in (Greece) Rhodes
- December 5 – 9: European Rapid & Blitz Chess Championship in (North Macedonia) Skopje

=== American Events ===
- March 29 – April 3: Carifta Junior Chess Championships 2018 in (Suriname) Paramaribo
  - U8 winners: (Trinidad and Tobago) Taydan Balliram (m) / (Aruba) Sylvi Cabral (f)
  - U10 winners: Ky-Mani Wijnhard (m) / (Barbados) Hannah Wilson (f)
  - U12 winners: (Jamaica) Darren Mckennis (m) / (Trinidad and Tobago) Zara La Fleur (f)
  - U14 winners: (Aruba) Ethan Samuel Croeze (m) / (Barbados) Vanessa Greenidge (f)
  - U16 winners: (Trinidad and Tobago) Alan-Safar Ramoutar (m) / (Jamaica) Adani Clarke (f)
  - U18 winners: (Suriname) Pierre Chang (m) / (Jamaica) Sheanael Gardner (f)
  - U20 winners: (Suriname) Pierre Chang (m) / (Jamaica) Sheanael Gardner (f)

=== American Zonals ===
- March 24 – 30: American Zone 2.3.3 in (Costa Rica) San José
  - Winners: (El Salvador) Jorge Ernesto Giron (m) / (Costa Rica) Thais Castillo Morales (f)

=== Arab Events ===
- January 26 – February 2: Arab Individual Championship 2017 (Open & Women) in (United Arab Emirates) Sharjah
  - Winners: (Algeria) Mohamed Haddouche (m) / (Algeria) Amina Mezioud (f)
- January 26 – February 2: Arab Youth U8-18 Chess Championship 2017 in (United Arab Emirates) Sharjah
- January 26 – February 2: Arab Junior & Girls U20 Chess Championship 2017 in (United Arab Emirates) Sharjah
  - Winner: (United Arab Emirates) Ibrahim Sultan
- February 3: Arab Rapid Championship 2017 (Open & Women) in (United Arab Emirates) Sharjah
  - Winners: (Algeria) Mohamed Haddouche (m) / (Jordan) Ghayda M. Alattar (f)
- February 4: Arab Blitz Championship 2017 (Open & Women) in (United Arab Emirates) Sharjah
  - Winners: (United Arab Emirates) Salem Saleh (m) / (Jordan) Alshaeby Boshra (f)
- February 5 – 12: Arab Chess Club 2017 (Open & Women) in (United Arab Emirates) Sharjah
  - Winners: (United Arab Emirates) ASSN

== Cricket ==
=== Tri-Nation Series ===
- January 11 – 23: 2017–18 United Arab Emirates Tri-Nation Series in United Arab Emirates
  - Round robin final ranking: 1. Ireland, 2. Scotland, 3. United Arab Emirates
- January 15 – 27: 2017–18 Bangladesh Tri-Nation Series in Bangladesh
  - In the final, Sri Lanka defeated Bangladesh, 221 (50 overs) – 142 (41.1 overs).
  - Sri Lanka won by 79 runs.
- February 2 – 21: 2017–18 Trans-Tasman Tri-Series in Australia and New Zealand
  - In the final, Australia defeated New Zealand, 121/3 (14.4 overs) – 150/9 (20 overs).
  - Australia won by 19 runs (D/L method).
- March 6 – 18: 2018 Nidahas Trophy in Sri Lanka
  - In the final, India defeated Bangladesh, 168/6 (20 overs) – 166/8 (20 overs).
  - India won by 4 wickets.
- March 19 – 31: 2017–18 India women's Tri-Nation Series in India
  - In the final, Australia defeated England, 209/4 (20 overs) – 152/9 (20 overs).
  - Australia Women won by 57 runs.
- June 12 – 20: 2018 Netherlands Tri-Nation Series in Netherlands
  - Round robin final ranking: 1. Scotland, 2. Netherlands, 3. Ireland
- June 20 – July 1: 2018 England women's Tri-Nation Series in England
  - In the final, England defeated New Zealand, 141/3 (17.1 overs) – 137/9 (20 overs).
  - England Women won by 7 wickets.
- July 1 – 8: 2018 Zimbabwe Tri-Nation Series in Zimbabwe
  - In the final, Pakistan defeated Australia, 187/4 (19.2 overs) – 183/8 (20 overs).
  - Pakistan won by 6 wickets.
- July 29: 2018 MCC Tri-Nation Series in England
  - Rain affected all three matches. The first two fixtures were both reduced to six overs per side. In the third and final match, only 16.4 overs of play was possible, with the game ending in a no result. Nepal and the Netherlands shared the series.

=== International Cricket Competitions ===
- January 8 – 20: 2018 Blind Cricket World Cup in Pakistan and United Arab Emirates
  - In the final, India defeated Pakistan, 309/8 (38.2 overs) – 308/8 (40 overs).
  - India won by 2 wickets.
- January 13 – February 3: 2018 Under-19 Cricket World Cup in New Zealand
  - In the final, India defeated Australia, 220/2 (38.5 overs) – 216 (47.2 overs).
  - India won by 8 wickets.
- February 8 – 15: 2018 ICC World Cricket League Division Two in Namibia
  - In the final, United Arab Emirates defeated Nepal, 277/4 (50 overs) – 270/8 (50 overs).
  - United Arab Emirates won by 7 runs.
  - United Arab Emirates and Nepal advanced to the 2018 Cricket World Cup Qualifier.
  - Canada and Namibia remained in Division Two.
  - Oman and Kenya relegated to Division Three for 2018.
- March 4 – 25: 2018 Cricket World Cup Qualifier in Zimbabwe
  - In the final, Afghanistan defeated West Indies, 206/3 (40.4 overs) – 204 (46.5 overs).
  - Afghanistan won by 7 wickets.
  - Afghanistan and West Indies qualified for the 2019 Cricket World Cup.
  - Scotland and United Arab Emirates retained ODI status until 2022.
  - Nepal gained ODI status until 2022.
  - Papua New Guinea and Hong Kong relegated to Division Two and lost ODI status.
- April 29 – May 6: 2018 ICC World Cricket League Division Four in Malaysia
  - Round robin final ranking: 1. Uganda, 2. Denmark, 3. Malaysia, 4. Jersey, 5. Vanuatu, 6. Bermuda
  - Uganda and Denmark promoted to Division Three for 2018.
  - Malaysia and Jersey remain in Division Four.
  - Vanuatu and Bermuda relegated to Division Five.
- June 3 – 10: 2018 Women's Twenty20 Asia Cup in Malaysia
  - In the final, Bangladesh defeated India, 113/7 (20 overs) – 112/9 (20 overs).
  - Bangladesh Women won by 3 wickets.
- July 7 – 14: 2018 ICC Women's World Twenty20 Qualifier in Netherlands
  - In the final, Bangladesh defeated Ireland, 122/9 (20 overs) – 95 (18.4 overs).
  - Bangladesh Women won by 25 runs.
  - Bangladesh and Ireland qualified for the 2018 ICC Women's World Twenty20.
- August 29 – September 6: 2018 Asia Cup Qualifier in Malaysia
  - In the final, Hong Kong defeated United Arab Emirates, 179/8 (23.3 overs) – 176/9 (24 overs).
  - Hong Kong won by 2 wickets (D/L method).
- September 15 – 28: 2018 Asia Cup in United Arab Emirates
  - In the final, India defeated Bangladesh, 223/7 (50 overs) – 222 (48.3 overs).
  - India won by 3 wickets
- November 9 – 21: 2018 ICC World Cricket League Division Three in Oman
- November 9 – 24: 2018 ICC Women's World Twenty20 in the (Cricket West Indies) West Indies
  - In the final, Australia defeated England, 106/2 (15.6 overs) – 105 (19.4 overs).
  - Australia won by 8 wickets

== Dancesport ==
Grand Slam

- March 3 & 4: WDSF Grand Slam #1 in (Finland) Helsinki
  - Adult Standard winners: (Russia) Dmitry Zharkov & Olga Kulikova
  - Adult Latin winners: (Russia) Armen Tsaturyan & Svetlana Gudyno

World Open

- January 13 & 14: WDSF World Open #1 in (Spain) Benidorm
  - Adult Standard winners: (Lithuania) Evaldas Sodeika & Ieva Žukauskaitė
  - Adult Latin winners: (Hungary) Andrea Silvestri & Martina Varadi
- January 27: WDSF World Open #2 in (Germany) Pforzheim
  - Adult Latin winners: (Germany) Marius-Andrei Balan & Kristina Moshenska
- February 10 & 11: WDSF World Open #3 in (Belgium) Berchem
  - Adult Standard winners: (Russia) Evgeny Nikitin & Anastasia Miliutina
  - Adult Latin winners: (Russia) Andrey Gusev & Vera Bondareva
- February 16 & 17: WDSF World Open #4 in (Denmark) Copenhagen
  - Adult Standard winners: (Republic of Ireland) Alessandro Bosco & Laura Nolan
  - Adult Latin winners: (Russia) Armen Tsaturyan & Svetlana Gudyno
- February 24: WDSF World Open #5 in (Portugal) Lisbon
  - Adult Latin winners: (Russia) Armen Tsaturyan & Svetlana Gudyno
- February 25: WDSF World Open #6 in (Russia) Moscow
  - Adult Standard winners: (Russia) Evgeny Nikitin & Anastasia Miliutina
- February 25: WDSF World Open #7 in (Japan) Tokyo
  - Adult Standard winners: (Lithuania) Evaldas Sodeika & Ieva Žukauskaitė
- March 10 & 11: WDSF World Open #8 in (Czech Republic) Brno
  - Adult Standard winners: (Austria) Vasily Kirin & Ekaterina Prozorova
  - Adult Latin winners: (Poland) Edgar Marcos Borjas & Alina Nowak
- March 24 & 25: WDSF World Open #9 in (Italy) Pieve di Cento
  - Adult Standard winners: (Russia) Dmitry Zharkov & Olga Kulikova
  - Adult Latin winners: (Russia) Armen Tsaturyan & Svetlana Gudyno
- March 25: WDSF PD World Open #10 in (Italy) Pieve di Cento
  - Adult Standard winners: (Germany) Benedetto Ferruggia & Claudia Koehler
- March 30: WDSF World Open #11 in (Germany) Berlin
  - Adult Standard winners: (Russia) Evgeny Moshenin & Dana Spitsyna
- March 31 & April 1: WDSF World Open #12 in (Romania) Bucharest
  - Adult Standard winners: (Russia) Alexey Glukhov & Anastasia Glazunova
  - Adult Latin winners: (Germany) Marius-Andrei Balan & Khrystyna Moshenska
- March 31 & April 1: WDSF World Open #13 in (Spain) Cambrils
  - Adult Standard winners: (Germany) Anton Skuratov & Alena Uehlin
  - Adult Latin winners: (Germany) Timur Imametdinov & Nina Bezzubova
- April 7 & 8: World Open #14 in (Russia) Moscow
  - Adult Standard winners: (Russia) Dmitry Zharkov & Olga Kulikova
  - Adult Latin winners: (Russia) Armen Tsaturyan & Svetlana Gudyno
- April 14 & 15: World Open #15 in (Greece) Paphos
  - Adult Standard winners: (Cyprus) Daniil Ulanov & Kateryna Isakovych
  - Adult Latin winners: (Bosnia and Herzegovina) Giacomo Lazzarini & Roberta Benedetti
- April 21 & 22: World Open #16 in (Ukraine) Uzhgorod
  - Adult Standard winners: (Germany) Dumitru Doga & Sarah Ertmer
  - Adult Latin winners: (Czech Republic) Marek Bures & Anastasiia Iermolenko
- April 24 & 25: World Open #17 in San Marino
  - Adult Standard winners: (Russia) Evgeny Moshenin & Dana Spitsyna
  - Adult Latin winners: (Russia) Armen Tsaturyan & Svetlana Gudyno
- April 28: World Open #18 in (Moldova) Chișinău
  - Adult Latin winners: (Moldova) Bogdan Boie & Natalia Luchiv

Grand Prix

- February 25: WDSF PD Super Grand Prix #1 in (Japan) Tokyo
  - Adult Standard winners: (Germany) Benedetto Ferruggia & Claudia Köhler
- March 24: WDSF PD Super Grand Prix #2 in (Italy) Pieve di Cento
  - Adult Latin winners: (Moldova) Gabriele Goffredo & Anna Matus

International Competitions

- February 17: WDSF European Championship (Standard) in (Denmark) Copenhagen
  - 1st place: (Russia) Dmitry Zharkov & Olga Kulikova
  - 2nd place: (Lithuania) Evaldas Sodeika & Ieva Žukauskaitė
  - 3rd place: (Italy) Francesco Galuppo & Debora Pacini
- February 25: WDSF European Championship (Adult Formation Standard & Youth Latin) in (Russia) Sochi
  - Youth Latin 1st place: (Russia) Egor Kulikov & Maria Goroshko
  - Youth Latin 2nd place: (Moldova) Vladislav Untu & Polina Baryshnikova
  - Youth Latin 3rd place: (Russia) Danila Mazur & Anastasia Polonskaya
  - Adult Formation Standard 1st place: (Russia) Vera Tyumen Standard Team
  - Adult Formation Standard 2nd place: (Germany) 1 TC Ludwigsburg
  - Adult Formation Standard 3rd place: (Hungary) Szilver TSE
- March 10: WDSF European Championship (10 Dance) in (Czech Republic) Brno
  - 1st place: (Estonia) Konstantin Gorodilov & Dominika Bergmannova
  - 2nd place: (Czech Republic) David Odstrčil & Tara Bohak
  - 3rd place: (Russia) Mikhail Koptev & Alexandra Atamantseva
- April 7: WDSF PD World Cup (Adult Standard) in (Russia) Chelyabinsk
  - 1st place: (Lithuania) Donatas Vėželis & Lina Chatkevičiūtė
  - 2nd place: (Germany) Simone Segatori & Annette Sudol
  - 3rd place: (Denmark) Bjorn Bitsch & Ashli Williamson
- April 7: WDSF World Championship (Under 21 Ten Dance) in (Russia) Moscow
  - 1st place: (Russia) Semen Khrzhanovskiy & Elizaveta Lykhina
  - 2nd place: (Russia) Oleg Chzhen & Alina Ageeva
  - 3rd place: (Russia) Gleb Bannikov & Maria Smirnova
- April 8: WDSF PD World Championship (Adult Show Dance Latin) in (Russia) Chelyabinsk
  - 1st place: (Russia) Alexandr Shmonin & Maria Shmonina
  - 2nd place: (Italy) Daniele Sargenti & Uliana Fomenko
  - 3rd place: (Russia) Denis Kikhtenko & Galina Akopian
- April 8: WDSF European Cup (Adult Latin) in (Russia) Moscow
  - 1st place: (Romania) Ionuț Alexandru Miculescu & Andra Păcurar
  - 2nd place: (Italy) Vincenzo Mariniello & Sara Casini
  - 3rd place: (Russia) Artem Efanin & Anna Dergunova
- April 28: WDSF World Championship (Junior II Ten Dance) in (Moldova) Chișinău
  - 1st place: (Russia) Yaroslav Kiselev & Sofia Philipchuk
  - 2nd place: (Moldova) Anton Porcesco-Gozun & Paola Popinin
  - 3rd place: (Romania) Răzvan-George Bătrânu & Ana-Maria Dica
- April 29: WDSF European Championship (Youth Ten Dance) in (Moldova) Chișinău
  - 1st place: (Moldova) Vladislav Untu & Polina Baryshnikova
  - 2nd place: (Russia) German Pugachev & Ariadna Tishova
  - 3rd place: (Lithuania) Gedvinas Meškauskas & Ugnė Bliujūtė

== Darts ==
=== Professional Darts Corporation ===
- December 14, 2017 – January 1: 2018 PDC World Darts Championship in (England) London
  - (England) Rob Cross defeated (England) Phil Taylor, 7–2
- January 26 – 28: 2018 Masters in (England) Milton Keynes
  - (Netherlands) Michael van Gerwen defeated (Netherlands) Raymond van Barneveld, 11–9
- February 1 – May 17: 2018 Premier League Darts at venues in Ireland, Wales, England, Germany, Scotland, Northern Ireland and Netherlands
  - (Netherlands) Michael van Gerwen defeated (England) Michael Smith, 11–4
- March 2 – 4: 2018 UK Open in (England) Minehead
  - (Scotland) Gary Anderson defeated (Australia) Corey Cadby, 11–7
- May 31 – June 3: 2018 PDC World Cup of Darts in (Germany) Frankfurt
  - Netherlands (Michael van Gerwen & Raymond van Barneveld) defeated Scotland (Peter Wright & Gary Anderson), 3–1
- July 21 – 29: 2018 World Matchplay in (England) Blackpool
  - (Scotland) Gary Anderson defeated (Austria) Mensur Suljović, 21–19
- September 22 – 23 : 2018 Champions League of Darts in (England) Brighton
  - (Scotland) Gary Anderson defeated (Scotland) Peter Wright, 11–4
- September 30 – October 6: 2018 World Grand Prix in (Republic of Ireland) Dublin
  - (Netherlands) Michael van Gerwen defeated (Scotland) Peter Wright, 5–2
- October 25 – 28: 2018 European Championship in (Germany) Dortmund
  - (England) James Wade defeated (Australia) Simon Whitlock, 11–8
- November 2 – 4: 2018 World Series of Darts Finals in (Austria) Vienna
  - (England) James Wade defeated (England) Michael Smith, 11–10
- November 10 – 18: 2018 Grand Slam of Darts in (England) Wolverhampton
  - (Wales) Gerwyn Price defeated (Scotland) Gary Anderson, 16–13
- November 23 – 25: 2018 Players Championship Finals in (England) Minehead
  - (Northern Ireland) Daryl Gurney defeated (Netherlands) Michael van Gerwen, 11–9
- November 25: 2018 PDC World Youth Championship Final in (England) Minehead
  - (Belgium) Dimitri Van den Bergh defeated (Germany) Martin Schindler, 6–3

==== World Series of Darts ====
- May 25: German Darts Masters in (Germany) Gelsenkirchen
  - (Austria) Mensur Suljović defeated (Belgium) Dimitri Van den Bergh, 8–2
- July 5 – 7: US Darts Masters in (United States) Las Vegas
  - (Scotland) Gary Anderson defeated (England) Rob Cross, 8–4
- July 13 – 14: Shanghai Darts Masters in (China) Shanghai
  - (England) Michael Smith defeated (England) Rob Cross, 8–2
- August 3 – 5: Auckland Darts Masters in (New Zealand) Auckland
  - (Netherlands) Michael van Gerwen defeated (Netherlands) Raymond van Barneveld, 11–4
- August 10 – 12: Melbourne Darts Masters in (Australia) Melbourne
  - (Scotland) Peter Wright defeated (England) Michael Smith, 11–8
- August 17 – 19: Brisbane Darts Masters in (Australia) Brisbane
  - (England) Rob Cross defeated (Netherlands) Michael van Gerwen, 11–6

=== British Darts Organisation ===
- January 6 – 14: 2018 BDO World Darts Championship in (England) Frimley Green
  - Men: (England) Glen Durrant defeated (England) Mark McGeeney, 7–6.
  - Women: (England) Lisa Ashton defeated (Russia) Anastasia Dobromyslova, 3–1.
- May 30 – June 3: 2018 World Trophy in (England) Preston
  - Men: (England) Glen Durrant defeated (Germany) Michael Unterbuchner, 10–7.
  - Women: (England) Fallon Sherrock defeated (England) Lorraine Winstanley, 6–3.
- October 3 – 7: 2018 World Masters in (England) Bridlington
  - Men: (England) Adam Smith-Neale defeated (England) Glen Durrant, 6–4.
  - Women: (England) Lisa Ashton defeated (England) Casey Gallagher, 5–2.

=== World Darts Federation ===
- July 6 – 10: WDF Americas Cup in (Trinidad and Tobago) Claxton Bay
  - Men's Singles: 1st. (The Bahamas) Robin Albury, 2nd (Barbados) Anthony Forde, 3rd. (United States) Tom Sawyer, 4th. (The Bahamas) Shane Sawyer
  - Women's Singles: 1st. (United States) Sandy Hudson, 2nd (Canada) Maria Mason, 3rd. (United States) Lisa Ayers, 4th. (Canada) Danna Foster
  - Team event: United States defeated Canada 7–5.
- July 12 – 15: WDF Europe Youth Cup in (Turkey) Ankara
  - Singles: (Netherlands) Jurjen van der Velde (b) / (England) Beau Greaves (g)
  - Pairs: (Republic of Ireland) Heffernan/Barry (b) / (England) Greaves/Reeves (g)
  - Team: Netherlands
- September 25 – 29: WDF Europe Cup (National Team) in Hungary
  - Singles: (Republic of Ireland) Martin Heneghan (m) / (Switzerland) Fiona Gaylor (f)
  - Pairs: (England) (Scott Mitchell & Daniel Day) (m) / (England) (Deta Hedman & Maria O'Brien) (f)
  - Team: Sweden (m) / England (f)
- October 16 – 19: WDF Asia Pacific Cup in South Korea

== Disc golf ==
=== Major world events ===
- January 7 – 13: WFDF 2018 World U24 Ultimate Championships in (Australia) Perth

Championship

  - Men's: 1. United States U24, 2. Italy U24, 3. Australia U24
  - Mixed: United States U24, 2. Japan U24, 3. Canada U24
  - Women's: United States U24, 2. Canada U24, 3. Australia U24

Spirit

  - Men's: 1. New Zealand U24, 2. China U24, 3. Ireland U24
  - Mixed: New Zealand U24, 2. Denmark U24, 3. United States U24
  - Women's: New Zealand U24, 2. Singapore U24, 3. Austria U24
- July 14 – 21: WFDF 2018 World Ultimate Club Championships in (United States) Cincinnati
- July 29 – August 4: WFDF 2018 World Masters Ultimate Club Championships in Winnipeg
  - Women's: 1. United States, 2. Japan, 3. United States
  - Men's: 1. United States, 2. United States, 3. United States
  - Mixed: 1. United States, 2. United States, 3. United States
  - Grand Master Men's: 1. United States, 2. United States, 3. Canada
- August 15 – 19: European Disc Golf Championships in (Croatia) Sveti Martin na Muri
  - Winners: (Germany) Simon Lizotte (m) / (Finland) Henna Blomroos (f)
- August 18 – 25: WFDF 2018 World Junior Ultimate Championships in (Canada) Waterloo

=== 2018 USA National Tour Events ===
- February 22 – 25: Las Vegas Challenge in (Nevada) Henderson
  - Winners: (Colorado) Eagle Wynne McMahon (m) / (Texas) Paige Pierce (f)
- April 21 – 28: Dynamic Discs Glass Blown Open in (Kansas) Emporia
  - Winners: (Colorado) Eagle Wynne McMahon (m) / (Texas) Paige Pierce (f)
- May 18 – 20: Santa Cruz Masters Cup in (California) Santa Cruz
  - Winners: (Ohio) Ricky Wysocki (m) / (Texas) Paige Pierce (f)
- June 8 – 10: Beaver State Fling in (Oregon) Estacada
  - Winners: (Colorado) Eagle Wynne McMahon (m) / (California) Catrina Allen (f)
- September 14 – 16: Delaware Disc Golf Challenge in Newark
  - Winners: (California) Paul McBeth (m) / (Idaho) Sarah Hokom (f)
- October 12 – 14: The Ed Headrick Disc Golf Hall of Fame Classic in (Georgia (U.S. state)) Appling
  - Winners: (California) Paul McBeth (m) / (California) Catrina Allen (f)

=== 2018 Disc Golf Pro Tour ===
- February 28 – March 3: DGPT #1 – Memorial Championship in (Arizona) Scottsdale
  - Winners: (Germany) Simon Lizotte (m) / (United States) Paige Pierce (f)
- March 16 – 18: DGPT #2 – Waco Charity Open in (Texas) Waco
  - Winners: (United States) Jeremy Koling / (United States) Paige Pierce (f)
- April 6 – 8: DGPT #3 – Jonesboro Open in (Arkansas) Jonesboro
  - Winners: (United States) Ricky Wysocki (m) / (United States) Paige Pierce (f)
- May 25 – 27: DGPT #4 – San Francisco Open in (California) San Francisco
  - Winners: (United States) Paul McBeth (m) / (United States) Sarah Hokom (f)
- June 22 – 24: DGPT #5 – Utah Open in Ogden
  - Winners: (United States) Ricky Wysocki (m) / (United States) Catrina Allen (f)
- July 6 – 8: DGPT #6 – Great Lakes Open in (Michigan) Milford
  - Winners: (United States) Paul McBeth (m) / (United States) Sarah Hokom (f)
- July 20 – 22: DGPT #7 – Idlewild Open in (Kentucky) Burlington
  - Winners: (United States) Paul McBeth (m) / (United States) Paige Pierce (f)
- August 9 – 12: DGPT #8 – Insurance Open in (Illinois) Eureka
  - Winners: (United States) Nathan Sexton (m) / (United States) Jessica Weese (f)
- August 24 – 26: DGPT #9 – MVP Open in (Massachusetts) Leicester
  - Winners: (United States) James Conrad (m) / (United States) Sarah Hokom (f)
- October 18 – 21: DGPT #10 – DGPT Tour Championship in (Florida) Jacksonville (final)
  - Winners: (United States) Chris Dickerson (m) / (United States) Sarah Hokom (f)

=== European Pro Tour ===
- April 20 – 22: RE/MAX Open – EPT#1 in (Finland) Vierumäki
  - Winners: (Finland) Mikael Räsänen (m) / (Finland) Henna Blomroos (f)
- June 22 – 24: Sula Open 2018 – EPT#2 in (Norway) Sula
  - Winners: (United States) Gregg Barsby (m) / (Finland) Eveliina Salonen (f)
- July 6 – 8: Skellefteå Open – EPT#3 in (Sweden) Skellefteå
  - Winners: (United States) Richard Wysocki (m) / (Finland) Eveliina Salonen (f)
- July 20 – 22: The Open – EPT#4 in (Sweden) Ale (final)
  - Winners: (United States) Richard Wysocki (m) / (Estonia) Kristin Tattar (f)

=== 2018 European Tour ===
- March 31 & April 1: Dutch Open – ET#1 in (Netherlands) Rijswijk
  - Winners: (Germany) Dominik Stampfer (m) / (Estonia) Kaidi Allsalu (f)
- April 14 & 15: Bluebell Woods Open – ET#2 in (United Kingdom) Dunbar
  - Winners: (Sweden) Max Regitnig (m) / (Estonia) Maris Perendi (f)
- May 19 & 20: Kokkedal Open – ET#3 in (Denmark) Kokkedal & Hillerød
  - Winners: (Denmark) Karl Johan Nybo (m) / (Estonia) Maris Perendi (f)
- June 9 & 10: Creeksea Classic – ET#4 in (United Kingdom) Burnham-on-Crouch
  - Winners: (Switzerland) Tony Ferro (m) / (United Kingdom) Lauren Kirsch (f)
- June 15 – 17: Alutaguse Open – ET#5 in (Estonia) Ida-Viru
  - Winners: (United States) Paul Ulibarri (m) / (Finland) Jenna Suhonen (f)
- August 11 & 12: Sibbe Open – ET#6 in (Finland) Sibbe
  - Winners: (Finland) Olli Pylsy (m) / (Finland) Terhi Kytö (f)
- September 7 – 9: Nokia Open in (Finland) Nokia (final)
  - Winners: (Finland) Mikael Räsänen (m) / (Finland) Eveliina Salonen (f)

== Field hockey ==
=== World Cup and Championships ===
- February 7 – 11: 2018 Men's Indoor Hockey World Cup in Berlin
  - Austria defeated Germany, 3–2 in penalties and after a 3–3 tie in regular play, to win their first Men's Indoor Hockey World Cup title.
  - Iran took third place.
- February 7 – 11: 2018 Women's Indoor Hockey World Cup in Berlin
  - Germany defeated the Netherlands, 2–1, to win their third Women's Indoor Hockey World Cup title.
  - Belarus took third place.
- June 23 – July 1: 2018 Men's Hockey Champions Trophy in Amsterdam
  - Australia defeated India, 3–1 in penalties and after a 1–1 score in regular play, to win their 15th Men's Hockey Champions Trophy title.
  - Netherlands took third place.
- July 21 – August 5: 2018 Women's Hockey World Cup in (England) London
  - Netherlands defeated Ireland, 6–0, to win their second consecutive and eighth overall Women's Hockey World Cup title.
  - Spain took third place.
- November 28 – December 16: 2018 Men's Hockey World Cup in (India) Bhubaneswar
  - Belgium defeated Netherlands, 3–2 in penalties and after a 0–0 score in regular play, to win their first Men's Hockey World Cup title.
  - Australia took third place.

Other international and continental competitions

- March 3 – 10: 2018 Sultan Azlan Shah Cup in (Malaysia) Ipoh
  - Australia defeated England, 2–1, to win their tenth Sultan Azlan Shah Cup title.
  - Argentina took third place.
- June 5 – September 23: 2018–19 Men's Hockey Series Open
  - Salamanca final ranking: 1. United States, 2. Mexico, 3. Puerto Rico, 4. Panama, 5. Costa Rica
  - Singapore final ranking: 1. Singapore, 2. Thailand, 3. Chinese Taipei, 4. Myanmar, 5. Hong Kong, 6. Indonesia
  - Zagreb final ranking: 1. Austria, 2. Wales, 3. Croatia, 4. Switzerland, 5. Slovakia
  - Port Vila final Ranking: 1. Vanuatu. 2. Fiji, 3. Solomon Islands, 4. Tonga
  - Gniezno final Ranking: 1. Poland, 2. Italy, 3. Ukraine, 4. Czech Republic, 5. Lithuania, 6. Cyprus
  - Lousada final Ranking: 1. Russia, 2. Scotland, 3. Belarus, 4. Gibraltar, 5. Portugal, 6. Turkey
  - Santiago final Ranking: 1. Chile, 2. Brazil, 3. Venezuela, 4. Uruguay, 5. Peru, 6. Bolivia
  - Bulawayo final Ranking: 1. Egypt, 2. Zimbabwe, 3. Zambia, 4. Namibia
- June 5 – September 23: 2018–19 Women's Hockey Series Open
  - Salamanca final ranking: 1. Canada, 2. Mexico, 3. Puerto Rico, 4. Panama, 5. Guatemala
  - Singapore final ranking: 1. Malaysia, 2. Thailand, 3. Singapore, 4. Kazakhstan, 5. Hong Kong, 6. Indonesia
  - Wattignies final ranking: 1. Belarus, 2. Russia, 3. France, 4. Austria
  - Port Vila final ranking: 1. Fiji, 2. Vanuatu, 3. Solomon Islands, 4. Tonga
  - Vilnius final ranking: Ukraine, 2. Czech Republic, 3. Wales, 4. Lithuania, 5. Turkey
  - Santiago final ranking: 1. Chile, 2. Uruguay, 3. Paraguay, 4. Brazil, 5. Peru, 6. Bolivia
  - Bulawayo final Ranking: 1. Namibia, 2. Zambia, 3. Zimbabwe

=== EHF ===
Club teams

- October 6, 2017 – May 27: 2017–18 Euro Hockey League
  - (Netherlands) HC Bloemendaal defeated fellow Dutch team, SV Kampong, 8–2, to win their third Euro Hockey League title.
  - (Netherlands) HC Rotterdam took third place.
- February 16 – 18: 2018 Men's EuroHockey Indoor Club Challenge II in (Georgia (country)) Tbilisi
  - Final Standings: 1st: (Ireland) Three Rock Rovers HC, 2nd: (Norway) Kringsjå Sportsklubb, 3rd: (Armenia) Hrazdan Hockey Club
- February 16 – 18: 2018 Men's EuroHockey Indoor Club Trophy in (Belarus) Minsk
  - Final Standings: 1st: (Belarus) HC Minsk, 2nd: (Sweden) Partille Sport Club, 3rd: (Poland) KS Pomorzanin Toruń, 4th: (Denmark) Slagelse HC
- February 16 – 18: 2018 Men's EuroHockey Indoor Club Challenge I in (Czech Republic) Prague
  - Final Standings: 1st: (Czech Republic) SK Slavia Prague, 2nd: (Turkey) Gaziantep Polisgücü SK, 3rd: (Ukraine) HC OKS-SHVSM Vinnitsa, 4th: (Portugal) A.D. Lousada
- February 16 – 18: 2018 Men's EuroHockey Indoor Club Cup in (Switzerland) Wettingen
  - In the final, (Germany) Rot-Weiss Köln defeated (Belgium) R. Racing Club Bruxelles, 5–2.
  - (Russia) Dinamo Elektrostal took third place.
- February 23 – 25: 2018 Women's EuroHockey Indoor Club Challenge I in (Slovenia) Murska Sobota
  - Final Standings: 1st: (Turkey) Bolu Belediyesi SK, 2nd: (Italy) CUS Pisa, 3rd: (Sweden) Partille Sport Club, 4th: (Bulgaria) FHC Akademik Plus
- February 23 – 25: 2018 Women's EuroHockey Indoor Club Trophy in (Czech Republic) Prague
  - Final Standings: 1st: (Belgium) Royal White Star HC, 2nd: (Russia) Dinamo Elektrostal, 3rd: (Czech Republic) SK Slavia Prague, 4th: (Lithuania) Gintra Strekte Uni HC
- February 23 – 25: 2018 Women's EuroHockey Indoor Club Cup in (Scotland) Dundee
  - In the final, (Germany) Uhlenhorster HC defeated (Spain) Club de Campo Villa de Madrid, 6–2.
  - (Netherlands) Amsterdamsche Hockey & Bandy Club took third place.
- May 17 – 20: 2018 Men's EuroHockey Club Challenge IV in (Finland) Helsinki
  - In the final, (Slovenia) HK Moravske Toplice defeated (Finland) ABC-Team, 2–1.
  - (Hungary) Soroksári – Olcote HC took third place.
- May 17 – 20: 2018 Men's EuroHockey Club Challenge II in (Slovenia) Lipovci
  - In the 1st promotion playoff (Wales) Whitchurch HC defeated (Gibraltar) Grammarians HC, 3–1 in a shoot-out after the match ended in a 4–4 draw.
  - In the 2nd promotion playoff (Croatia) Hokejski Klub Zelina defeated (Slovenia) HK Lipovci, 8–4.
  - Hokejski Klub Zelina and Whitchurch HC were joint winners whilst Grammarians HC and HK Lipovci were joint 3rd.
- May 17 – 20: 2018 EuroHockey Club Champions Cup in (England) London
  - (Netherlands) HC 's-Hertogenbosch defeated (Germany) Hamburg, 2–1, to win their third consecutive and 16th overall EuroHockey Club Champions Cup title.
  - (Spain) Club de Campo took third place.
- May 18 – 21: 2018 Men's EuroHockey Club Challenge I in (Switzerland) Geneva
  - In the final, (Czech Republic) HC Slavia Praha defeated (Croatia) HAHK Mladost, 3–0.
  - (Portugal) C.F. União de Lamas took third place.
- May 18 – 21: 2018 Women's EuroHockey Club Challenge II in (Belgium) Ghent
  - In the final, (Belgium) Gantoise HC defeated (Lithuania) Žuvėdra-Tauras, 16–0.
  - (Switzerland) Black Boys HC Geneve took third place.
- May 18 – 21: 2018 Women's EuroHockey Club Challenge III in (Austria) Vienna
  - In the final, (Turkey) Gaziantep Polisgücü SK defeated (Croatia) Hockey Klub Zelina, 19–0.
  - (Austria) Navax AHTC Wien took third place.
- May 18 – 21: 2018 Men's EuroHockey Club Challenge III in (Denmark) Copenhagen
  - In the final, (Turkey) Gaziantep Polisgücü SK defeated (Sweden) Nacka LHK, 5–1.
  - (Lithuania) Žuvėdra-Tauras took third place.
- May 18 – 21: 2018 Men's EuroHockey Club Trophy in (Austria) Vienna
  - (Scotland) Grange HC defeated (Ukraine) HC OKS-SHVSM Vinnitsa, 5–2, in the final.
  - (Belarus) HC Minsk took third place.
- May 18 – 21: 2018 Women's EuroHockey Club Challenge I in (Scotland) Edinburgh
  - In the final, (Scotland) Edinburgh University HC defeated (Scotland) Milne Craig Clydesdale Western, 1–0.
  - (Belgium) Braxgata HC took third place.
- May 18 – 21: 2018 Women's EuroHockey Club Trophy in (Republic of Ireland) Dublin
  - (England) Holcombe HC defeated (Spain) Junior FC, 4–2 in a shootout and after a 1–1 score, in the final.
  - (Belarus) GHC Ritm Grodno took third place.

National teams

- January 12 – 14: 2018 Men's EuroHockey Indoor Nations Championship in Antwerp
  - In the final, Austria defeated Belgium, after penalties, 2–1. Regular match was 4–4.
  - Germany took third place.
- January 12 – 14: 2018 Men's EuroHockey Indoor Nations Championship II in (Turkey) Alanya
  - Final Standings: 1st: Netherlands, 2nd: Ukraine, 3rd: Sweden, 4th: Croatia
- January 12 – 14: 2018 Men's EuroHockey Indoor Nations Championship III in Nicosia
  - Final Standings: 1st: Belarus, 2nd: Slovakia, 3rd: Scotland, 4th: Wales, 5th: Slovenia, 6th: Cyprus, 7th: Greece
- January 19 – 21: 2018 Women's EuroHockey Indoor Nations Championship in (Czech Republic) Prague
  - Germany defeated the Netherlands, 2–1 in penalties and after a 1–1 score in regular play, to win their 15th Women's EuroHockey Indoor Nations Championship title.
  - Belarus took third place.
- January 19 – 21: 2018 Women's EuroHockey Indoor Nations Championship II in Brussels
  - Final Standings: 1st: Belgium, 2nd: Austria, 3rd: England, 4th: Croatia
- January 20 & 21: 2018 Women's EuroHockey Indoor Nations Championship III in Apače
  - Final Standings: 1st: Turkey, 2nd: Slovakia, 3rd: Slovenia
- June 21 – 24: EuroHockey South East Europe Championships Hockey5s U15 Boys & Girls in Albena
  - Boys final ranking: 1st: Armenia, 2nd: Bulgaria, 3rd: Turkey
  - Girls final ranking: 1st: Bulgaria, 2nd: Georgia, 3rd: Romania
- July 15 – 21: 2018 EuroHockey Youth U18 Championships III for boy's and girl's in Konya
  - Boys final ranking: 1st: Ukraine, 2nd: Turkey, 3rd: Croatia
  - Girls final ranking: 1st: Switzerland, 2nd: Ukraine, 3rd: Croatia
- July 15 – 21: 2018 EuroHockey Youth U18 Championship II Girls in Rakovník
  - Girls final ranking: 1st: Scotland, 2nd: Russia, 3rd: Czech Republic
- July 15 – 21: 2018 EuroHockey Youth U18 Championships for boy's and girl's in Santander
  - Boys final ranking: 1st: Spain, 2nd: Netherlands, 3rd: Germany
  - Girls final ranking: 1st: Netherlands, 2nd: Belgium, 3rd: England
- July 22 – 28: 2018 EuroHockey Youth U18 Championships II in (Wales) Cardiff
  - Boys final ranking: 1st: Russia, 2nd: Scotland, 3rd: Austria

=== PAHF ===
- March 12 – 17: 2018 Youth Pan American Championships (Men) in Guadalajara
  - In the final, Argentina defeated Mexico, 3–2. Canada took third place and Paraguay took fourth place.
- March 12 – 17: 2018 Youth Pan American Championships (Women) in Guadalajara
  - In the final, Argentina defeated Uruguay, 4–0. Mexico took third place and Paraguay took fourth place.

=== AHF ===
- May 13 – 20: 2018 Asian Women's Hockey Champions Trophy in Donghae City
  - South Korea defeated India, 1–0, to win their third Asian Women's Hockey Champions Trophy title.
  - China took third place.
- October 18 – 28: 2018 Asian Men's Hockey Champions Trophy in (Oman) Muscat
  - Note: Due to heavy rain, both India and Pakistan took first place here.
  - Malaysia took third place.

== Fistball ==
=== IFA ===
- July 11 – 15: IFA 2018 Fistball U18 World Championships in (United States) Roxbury Township
- July 24 – 28: IFA 2018 Fistball Women's World Championship in (Austria) Linz

=== EFA ===
- January 6 & 7: EFA 2018 Fistball Women's Champions Cup in (Switzerland) Jona
  - In the final, (Germany) TSV Dennach defeated (Austria) Titel gg. Union Nussbach, 4–2 (11–7, 6–11, 8–11, 13–11, 11–8, 11–6).
  - (Switzerland) TSV Jona took third place.
- January 12 & 13: EFA 2018 Fistball Men's Champions Cup Indoor in (Germany) Dötlingen
  - In the final, (Germany) TSV Pfungstadt defeated (Germany) TV Brettorf, 4–2 (11:9, 6:11, 5:11, 11:5, 11:5, 11:8).
  - (Switzerland) SVD Diepoldsau-Schmitter took third place.
- July 6 – 8: EFA 2018 Men's European Cup in Austria
- July 7 & 8: EFA 2018 Fistball Women's Champions Cup in (Germany) Schneverdingen
- July 6 – 8: EFA 2018 Men's Champions Cup in Switzerland

== Floorball ==
=== Europe ===
- August 22 – 26: EuroFloorball Challenge
- October 10 – 14: EuroFloorball Cup

=== Asia & Oceania ===
- June 18 – 23: AOFC Cup 2018 in Singapore

=== World and Continental ===
- May 2 – 6: 2018 Women's U19 World Floorball Championships in (Switzerland) St.Gallen & Herisau
  - In final, Sweden defeated Finland, 7–2, to win their 5th Under-19 World Floorball Championships. Czech Republic took third place and Poland fourth place.
- June 26 – 30: 8th World University Floorball Championship in (Poland) Łódź
- December 1 – 9: 2018 Men's World Floorball Championships in Prague
  - In final, Finland defeated Sweden, 6–3, to win their 4th Men's World Floorball Championship. Switzerland took third place and Czech Republic fourth place.

== Golf ==
=== 2018 Men's major golf championships ===
- April 5 – 8: 2018 Masters Tournament in (Georgia (U.S. state)) Augusta
  - Winner: (United States) Patrick Reed (first major title & 6th PGA Tour win)
- June 14 – 17: 2018 U.S. Open in (New York (state)) Southampton
  - Winner: (United States) Brooks Koepka (second major title, 2nd U.S. Open title, & 3rd PGA Tour win)
- July 19 – 22: 2018 Open Championship in (Scotland) Carnoustie
  - Winner: (Italy) Francesco Molinari (first major title & 2nd PGA Tour win)
- August 9 – 12: 2018 PGA Championship in (Missouri) St. Louis
  - Winner: (United States) Brooks Koepka (third major title, 1st PGA Championship title, & 4th PGA Tour win)

=== 2018 World Golf Championships (WGC) ===
- March 1 – 4: 2018 WGC-Mexico Championship in Naucalpan at the Club de Golf Chapultepec
  - Winner: (United States) Phil Mickelson (third WGC-Mexico Championship title & 43rd PGA Tour win)
- March 21 – 25: 2018 WGC-Dell Technologies Match Play in (Texas) Austin
  - Winner: (United States) Bubba Watson (first WGC-Dell Technologies Match Play title & 13th PGA Tour win)
- August 2 – 5: 2018 WGC-Bridgestone Invitational in (Ohio) Akron
  - Winner: (United States) Justin Thomas (first WGC-Bridgestone Invitational title & 9th PGA Tour win)
- October 25 – 28: 2018 WGC-HSBC Champions in (China) Shanghai
  - Winner: (United States) Xander Schauffele (first WGC-HSBC Champions title & 3rd PGA Tour win)

=== 2018 Women's major golf championships ===
- March 29 – April 1: 2018 ANA Inspiration in Rancho Mirage, California
  - Winner: (Sweden) Pernilla Lindberg (first major title and first LPGA Tour win)
- May 31 – June 3: 2018 U.S. Women's Open in Shoal Creek, Alabama
  - Winner: (Thailand) Ariya Jutanugarn (second major title, first U.S. Women's Open title, and ninth LPGA Tour win)
- June 28 – July 1: 2018 KPMG Women's PGA Championship in Kildeer, Illinois
  - Winner: (South Korea) Park Sung-hyun (second major title, first KPMG Women's PGA Championship title, and fourth LGPA Tour win)
- August 2 – 5: 2018 Women's British Open in Lancashire, England
  - Winner: (England) Georgia Hall (first major title and first LPGA Tour win)
- September 13 – 16: 2018 Evian Championship in Évian-les-Bains, France
  - Winner: (United States) Angela Stanford (first major title and sixth LPGA Tour win)

=== 2018 Senior major golf championships ===
- May 17 – 20: Regions Tradition in (Alabama) Birmingham
  - Winner: (Spain) Miguel Ángel Jiménez (first senior major title & 5th PGA Tour Champions win)
- May 24 – 27: Senior PGA Championship in (Michigan) Benton Harbor
  - Winner: (England) Paul Broadhurst (first Senior PGA Championship & 4th PGA Tour Champions win)
- June 28 – July 1: U.S. Senior Open in Colorado Springs
  - Winner: (United States) David Toms (first U.S. Senior Open & first PGA Tour Champions win)
- July 12 – 15: Senior Players Championship in (Illinois) Highland Park at the Exmoor Country Club
  - Winner: (Fiji) Vijay Singh (first Senior Players Championship & 3rd PGA Tour Champions win)
- July 26 – 29: Senior Open Championship in (Scotland) Fife
  - Winner: (Spain) Miguel Ángel Jiménez (second senior major title & 6th PGA Tour Champions win)

=== 2018 women's senior events ===
- July 12 – 15: 2018 U.S. Senior Women's Open in Wheaton, Illinois
  - Winner: (England) Laura Davies (inaugural U.S. Senior Women's Open & second Legends Tour win)
- October 14 – 17: 2018 Senior LPGA Championship in French Lick & West Baden Springs, Indiana
  - Winner: (England) Laura Davies (first Senior LPGA Championship win.)

=== Other golf events ===
- January 12 – 14: 2018 EurAsia Cup in (Malaysia) Shah Alam
  - Team Europe defeated Team Asia, 14–10, to win their second consecutive EurAsia Cup title.
- May 10 – 13: 2018 Players Championship
  - Winner: (United States) Webb Simpson (first Players Championship title; fifth PGA Tour victory)
- May 16 – 19: 2018 World University Golf Championship in (Philippines) Lubao, Pampanga
  - Individual winners: (Japan) Daiki Imano (m) / (South Korea) MA Da-som (f)
  - Team winners: Japan (Daiki Imano, Yuto Katsuragawa, & Taisei Shimizu) (m) / South Korea (KANG Min-ji, MA Da-som, & SON Yeon-jung) (f)
- September 28 – 30: 2018 Ryder Cup at the Albatros Course of Le Golf National in (France) Saint-Quentin-en-Yvelines
  - (European Union) Team Europe defeated (United States) Team USA, 17½–10½, to win their 12th Ryder Cup title.
- October 4 – 7: 2018 International Crown at Jack Nicklaus Golf Club Korea in Incheon
  - Winners: South Korea (Park Sung-hyun, Ryu So-yeon, In-Kyung Kim, & Chun In-gee) (first International Crown win)

== Handball ==
=== World handball championships ===
- July 1 – 14: 2018 Women's Junior World Handball Championship in Debrecen
  - Hungary defeated Norway, 28–22, to win their first Women's Junior World Handball Championship title.
  - South Korea took third place.
- July 24 – 29: 2018 Beach Handball World Championships for Men and Women in (Russia) Kazan
  - Men: Brazil defeated Croatia, 2 out of 3 matches played, to win their fifth Men's Beach Handball World Championships title.
    - Hungary took third place.
  - Women: Greece defeated Norway, 2–1 in matches played, to win their first Women's Beach Handball World Championships title.
    - Brazil took third place.
- July 30 – August 5: 2018 World University Handball Championship in Rijeka
  - Men: South Korea defeated Croatia, 36–31, in the final. Japan took third place.
  - Women: Japan defeated Brazil, 27–19, in the final. South Korea took third place.
- August 7 – 19: 2018 Women's Youth World Handball Championship in (Poland) Kielce
  - Russia defeated Hungary, 29–27, to win their second consecutive and third overall Women's Youth World Handball Championship title.
  - South Korea took third place.

=== EHF ===
National teams

- January 12 – 28: 2018 European Men's Handball Championship in Croatia
  - Spain defeated Sweden, 29–23, to win their 1st European Men's Handball Championship. France took third place.
  - Note: Both Spain & France have qualified to compete at the 2019 World Men's Handball Championship. (Denmark & Germany co-hosting the event.)
- August 9 – 19: 2018 European Men's U-18 Handball Championship in (Croatia) Varaždin & Koprivnica
  - Sweden defeated Iceland, 32–27, to win their second European Men's U-18 Handball Championship title.
  - Denmark took third place.

Clubs

- August 30, 2017 – March 17: 2017–18 SEHA League
  - April 13 & 15: 2017–18 SEHA League Final Four in (North Macedonia) Skopje
    - (North Macedonia) RK Vardar defeated (Croatia) PPD Zagreb, 26–24, to win their second consecutive and fourth overall SEHA League title.
    - (Slovenia) Celje Pivovarna Laško took third place.
- September 2, 2017 – May 20: 2017–18 EHF Cup
  - (Germany) Füchse Berlin defeated (France) Saint-Raphaël, 28–25, to win their second EHF Cup title.
  - (Germany) SC Magdeburg took third place.
- September 2, 2017 – May 27: 2017–18 EHF Champions League
  - (France) Montpellier defeated fellow French team, HBC Nantes, 32–26, to win their second EHF Champions League title.
  - (France) Paris Saint-Germain took third place.
- September 8, 2017 – May 11: 2017–18 Women's EHF Cup
  - (Romania) SCM Craiova defeated (Norway) Vipers Kristiansand, 52–51 on aggregate, to win their first Women's EHF Cup title.
- September 9, 2017 – May 13: 2017–18 Women's EHF Champions League
  - (Hungary) Győri ETO defeated (North Macedonia) HC Vardar, 27–26 in overtime, to win their second consecutive and fourth overall Women's EHF Champions League title.
  - (Romania) CSM București took third place.
- October 7, 2017 – May 20: 2017–18 EHF Challenge Cup
  - (Romania) AHC Potaissa Turda defeated (Greece) A.E.K. Athens, 59–49 on aggregate in a 2-legged matches, to win their first EHF Challenge Cup title.
- October 14, 2017 – May 13: 2017–18 Women's EHF Challenge Cup
  - (Poland) MKS Lublin defeated (Spain) Rocasa Gran Canaria, 49–45 on aggregate in a 2-legged matches, to win their first Women's EHF Challenge Cup title.

=== AHF ===
National teams

- January 18 – 28: 2018 Asian Men's Handball Championship in Suwon
  - In the final, Qatar defeated Bahrain, 33–31, to win their 3rd Asian Men's Handball Championship. South Korea took third place.
  - Note: All teams mentioned above, with Saudi Arabia, have qualified to compete at the 2019 World Men's Handball Championship.
- February 15 – 21: 2018 West Asian Women's Handball Championship in Amman
  - Winners: 1st place: Iran, 2nd place: Jordan, 3rd place: Syria
- July 16 – 26: 2018 Asian Men's Junior Handball Championship in (Oman) Salalah
  - South Korea defeated Japan, 27–25 in extra time, to win their third Asian Men's Junior Handball Championship title.
  - Bahrain took third place.
  - Note: All teams mentioned above have qualified to compete at the 2019 Men's Junior World Handball Championship.
- September 16 – 26: 2018 Asian Men's Youth Handball Championship in (Jordan) Amman
  - Bahrain defeated Japan, 34–31, to win their second consecutive Asian Men's Youth Handball Championship title.
  - Chinese Taipei took third place.
  - Note: All teams mentioned here have qualified to compete at the 2019 Men's Youth World Handball Championship.
- November 30 – December 9: 2018 Asian Women's Handball Championship in Kumamoto
  - South Korea defeated Japan, 30–25, to win their 14th Asian Women's Handball Championship title.
  - China took third place.

Clubs

- October 3 – 9: 2018 Asian Women's Club League Handball Championship in (Kazakhstan) Astana
  - Champions: (Kazakhstan) Almaty Club; Second: (Kazakhstan) Kaysar Club; Third: (Kazakhstan) Astana Club
- November 10 – 23: 2018 Asian Men's Club League Handball Championship in (Jordan) Amman

=== CAHB ===
National teams

- January 17 – 28: 2018 African Men's Handball Championship in (Gabon) Libreville
  - Tunisia defeated Egypt, 26–24, to win their 10th African Men's Handball Championship. Angola took third place.
  - Note: All teams mentioned here have qualified to compete at the 2019 World Men's Handball Championship.

Clubs

- April 12 – 22: 2018 African Men's and Women's Club Handball Championship in Egypt

=== PATHF ===
National teams

- March 21 – 25: 2018 Pan American Women's Junior Handball Championship in Goiânia
  - Brazil won the round robin tournament with Chile in second and Paraguay in third.
  - Note: All teams mentioned above have qualified to compete at the 2018 Women's Junior World Handball Championship.
- April 10 – 14: 2018 Pan American Women's Youth Handball Championship in Buenos Aires
  - Brazil won the round robin tournament with Chile in second and Argentina in third.
  - Note: All teams mentioned above have qualified to compete at the 2018 Women's Youth World Handball Championship.
- June 16 – 24: 2018 Pan American Men's Handball Championship in (Greenland) Nuuk
  - Argentina defeated Brazil, 29–24, to win their seventh Pan American Men's Handball Championship title.
  - Chile took third place.
  - Note: All three teams mentioned above have qualified to compete at the 2019 World Men's Handball Championship.
- November 29 – December 4: 2018 South and Central American Women's Handball Championship in Maceió
  - Brazil won the round robin tournament with Argentina in second and Chile in third.
  - Note: Brazil and Argentina have qualified to compete at the 2019 World Women's Handball Championship.

Clubs

- May 23 – 27: 2018 Pan American Men's Club Handball Championship in (Brazil) Taubaté
  - (Brazil) Handebol Taubaté defeated (Argentina) SAG Villa Ballester, 26–18, to win their fifth Pan American Men's Club Handball Championship title.
  - (Brazil) EC Pinheiros took third place.
  - Note: Handebol Taubaté has qualified to compete at the 2018 IHF Super Globe.

== Korfball ==
=== Europe ===
- January 11 – 13: IKF Europa Cup 2018 in (Spain) Castell-Platja d'Aro
  - In the final, (Netherlands) KV TOP/SolarCompleet defeated (Belgium) AKC/Luma Korfbalclub, 28–21.
  - (Germany) SG Pegasus took third place and (Portugal) Núcleo Corfebol Benfica took fourth place.
- January 26 – 28: IKF Europa Shield 2018 in (Portugal) Odivelas
  - In the final, (Germany) KV Adler Rauxel defeated (England) Bec Korfball Club, 16–13.
  - (Czech Republic) Brno KK took third place and (England) Norwich Knights KC took fourth place.
- March 30 – April 1: IKF U19 Open European Korfball Championship in Leeuwarden
  - In the final, Netherlands defeated Belgium, 25–18.
  - England took third place and Portugal took fourth place.
- June 28 – July 1: U15 European Korfball Championship in (Netherlands) Drachten

=== Americas ===
- March 2 – 4: IKF 2018 Pan-American Korfball Championship in Cali
  - Winners: Suriname, 2nd place: Dominican Republic, 3rd place: Brazil, 4th place: Colombia, 5th place: Argentina, 6th place: Costa Rica

=== Africa ===
- April 27 – 29: IKF 2018 All-Africa Korfball Championship in Chitungwiza
  - Winners: South Africa, 2nd place: Zimbabwe, 3rd place: Zambia

=== Asia ===
- April 10 – 15: 3rd IKF Asia U19 & U16 Korfball4 Championships in Taoyuan
  - U16 final ranking: 1. Chinese Taipei, 2. Hong Kong, 3. Malaysia, 4. Thailand, 5. China, 6. Sri Lanka
  - U19 final ranking: 1. Chinese Taipei, 2. China, 3. Malaysia, 4. Thailand, 5. Hong Kong, 6. Sri Lanka

=== World ===
- June 23 & 24: U17 Korfball World Cup in Eindhoven
  - In the final, Netherlands defeated Belgium, 22–17.
  - England took third place and Germany took fourth place.
- July 7 – 14: IKF U21 World Korfball Championship im (Hungary) Budapest
- August 8 – 12: 1st University World Korfball Championship in (Portugal) Vila Real
- August 11 & 12: IKF Beach Korfball World Cup in Blankenberge
  - In the final, Belgium defeated Portugal, 8–4.
  - Poland took third place and Hungary took fourth place.

== Lacrosse ==
- July 12 – 21: 2018 World Lacrosse Championship in (Israel) Netanya
  - United States defeated Canada, 9–8, to win their tenth World Lacrosse Championship title.
  - Haudenosaunee took third place.
- August 4 – 11: 2018 European Women's Under 20s Lacrosse Championship in (Poland) Katowice
  - England defeated Czech Republic, 12–3, in the final. Wales took third place.

== Minifootball ==
=== WMF ===
- October 4 – 7: U21 WMF World Cup in Prague
  - In the final, Czech Republic defeated Slovenia, 2–1.
  - Colombia took third place and Italy took fourth place.
- October 13 – 20: WMF Arena Soccer World Championship 2018 in (Mexico) Hermosillo
- TBD for December: WMF Continental Cup in Tunisia

=== EMF ===
- August 12 – 18: 2018 EMF EURO in (Ukraine) Kyiv
  - In the final, Czech Republic defeated Romania, 4–1, to win the 1st title.
  - Kazakhstan took third place and England took fourth place.
- September 5 – 9: EMF Champions League 2018 in (Slovenia) Čatež ob Savi
  - In the final, (Romania) MAV Sports Timișoara defeated (Romania) AS Coriolan Bacău, 2–1, after penalties, (initial match ended 0–0) to win the 1st title.
  - (Romania) Juventus Sibiu took third place and (Romania) Tanzmannschaft București took fourth place.

=== CPM ===
- June 7 – 12: 2018 Pan-American Cup in Guatemala
  - In the final, Chile defeated Guatemala, 9–2, to win the title.
  - Mexico took third place and Brazil took fourth place.

=== AMF ===
- May 5 – 12: 2018 African Minifootball Cup in Libya
  - In the final Ivory Coast defeated Senegal, 3–1, after penalties, (initial match ended 3–3) to win the 1st edition.
  - Tunisia took third place and Libya took fourth place.

== Motorsport ==
=== 2018 Formula One World Championship ===
- March 25: (Australia) 2018 Australian Grand Prix Winner: (Germany) Sebastian Vettel ( (Italy) Ferrari)
- April 8: 2018 Bahrain Grand Prix Winner: (Germany) Sebastian Vettel ( (Italy) Ferrari)
- April 15: (China) 2018 Chinese Grand Prix Winner: (Australia) Daniel Ricciardo ( (Austria) Red Bull Racing-TAG Heuer)
- April 29: 2018 Azerbaijan Grand Prix Winner: (United Kingdom) Lewis Hamilton ( (Germany) Mercedes)
- May 13: (Spain) 2018 Spanish Grand Prix Winner: (United Kingdom) Lewis Hamilton ( (Germany) Mercedes)
- May 27: 2018 Monaco Grand Prix Winner: (Australia) Daniel Ricciardo ( (Austria) Red Bull Racing-TAG Heuer)
- June 10: (Canada) 2018 Canadian Grand Prix Winner: (Germany) Sebastian Vettel ( (Italy) Ferrari)
- June 24: (France) 2018 French Grand Prix Winner: (United Kingdom) Lewis Hamilton ( (Germany) Mercedes)
- July 1: (Austria) 2018 Austrian Grand Prix Winner: (Netherlands) Max Verstappen ( (Austria) Red Bull Racing-TAG Heuer)
- July 8: (United Kingdom) 2018 British Grand Prix Winner: (Germany) Sebastian Vettel ( (Italy) Ferrari)
- July 22: (Germany) 2018 German Grand Prix Winner: (United Kingdom) Lewis Hamilton ( (Germany) Mercedes)
- July 29: (Hungary) 2018 Hungarian Grand Prix Winner: (United Kingdom) Lewis Hamilton ( (Germany) Mercedes)
- August 26: (Belgium) 2018 Belgian Grand Prix Winner: (Germany) Sebastian Vettel ( (Italy) Ferrari)
- September 2: (Italy) 2018 Italian Grand Prix Winner: (United Kingdom) Lewis Hamilton ( (Germany) Mercedes)
- September 16: 2018 Singapore Grand Prix Winner: (United Kingdom) Lewis Hamilton ( (Germany) Mercedes)
- September 30: (Russia) 2018 Russian Grand Prix Winner: (United Kingdom) Lewis Hamilton ( (Germany) Mercedes)
- October 7: (Japan) 2018 Japanese Grand Prix Winner: (United Kingdom) Lewis Hamilton ( (Germany) Mercedes)
- October 21: 2018 United States Grand Prix Winner: (Finland) Kimi Räikkönen ( (Italy) Ferrari)
- October 28: (Mexico) 2018 Mexican Grand Prix Winner: (Netherlands) Max Verstappen ( (Austria) Red Bull Racing-TAG Heuer)
- November 11: (Brazil) 2018 Brazilian Grand Prix Winner: (United Kingdom) Lewis Hamilton ( (Germany) Mercedes)
- November 25: (United Arab Emirates) 2018 Abu Dhabi Grand Prix (final): (United Kingdom) Lewis Hamilton ( (Germany) Mercedes)

=== 2017–18 Formula E season ===
- December 2 & 3, 2017: 2017 Hong Kong ePrix
  - Winners: Race #1: (United Kingdom) Sam Bird ( (United Kingdom) DS Virgin Racing) / Race #2: (Sweden) Felix Rosenqvist ( (India) Mahindra Racing)
- January 13: (Morocco) 2018 Marrakesh ePrix Winner: (Sweden) Felix Rosenqvist ( (India) Mahindra Racing)
- February 3: (Chile) 2018 Santiago ePrix Winner: (France) Jean-Éric Vergne ( (China) Techeetah)
- March 3: 2018 Mexico City ePrix Winner: (Germany) Daniel Abt ( (Germany) Audi Sport Abt Schaeffler)
- March 17: (Uruguay) 2018 Punta del Este ePrix Winner: (France) Jean-Éric Vergne ( (China) Techeetah)
- 14 April 2018: (Italy) 2018 Rome ePrix Winner: (United Kingdom) Sam Bird ( (United Kingdom) DS Virgin Racing)
- 28 April 2018: (France) 2018 Paris ePrix Winner: (France) Jean-Éric Vergne ( (China) Techeetah)
- 19 May 2018: (Germany) 2018 Berlin ePrix Winner: (Germany) Daniel Abt ( (Germany) Audi Sport Abt Schaeffler)
- 10 June 2018: (Switzerland) 2018 Zürich ePrix Winner: (Brazil) Lucas Di Grassi ( (Germany) Audi Sport Abt Schaeffler)
- July 14 & 15 2018: (United States) 2018 New York City ePrix (final)
  - Winners: Race #1: (Brazil) Lucas Di Grassi ( (Germany) Audi Sport Abt Schaeffler) / Race #2: (France) Jean-Éric Vergne ( (China) Techeetah)

=== 2018 MotoGP season ===
- March 18: 2018 Qatar motorcycle Grand Prix
  - MotoGP winner: (Italy) Andrea Dovizioso ( (Italy) Ducati)
  - Moto2 winner: (Italy) Francesco Bagnaia ( (Germany) Kalex)
  - Moto3 winner: (Spain) Jorge Martín ( (Japan) Honda)
- April 8: (Argentina) 2018 Argentine motorcycle Grand Prix
  - MotoGP winner: (United Kingdom) Cal Crutchlow ( (Japan) Honda)
  - Moto2 winner: (Italy) Mattia Pasini ( (Germany) Kalex)
  - Moto3 winner: (Italy) Marco Bezzecchi ( (Austria) KTM)
- April 22: (United States) 2018 Motorcycle Grand Prix of the Americas
  - MotoGP winner: (Spain) Marc Márquez ( (Japan) Honda)
  - Moto2 winner: (Italy) Francesco Bagnaia ( (Germany) Kalex)
  - Moto3 winner: (Spain) Jorge Martín ( (Japan) Honda)
- May 6: (Spain) 2018 Spanish motorcycle Grand Prix
  - MotoGP winner: (Spain) Marc Márquez ( (Japan) Honda)
  - Moto2 winner: (Italy) Lorenzo Baldassarri ( (Germany) Kalex)
  - Moto3 winner: (Germany) Philipp Öttl ( (Austria) KTM)
- May 20: (France) 2018 French motorcycle Grand Prix
  - MotoGP winner: (Spain) Marc Márquez ( (Japan) Honda)
  - Moto2 winner: (Italy) Francesco Bagnaia ( (Germany) Kalex)
  - Moto3 winner: (Spain) Albert Arenas ( (Austria) KTM)
- June 3: (Italy) 2018 Italian motorcycle Grand Prix
  - MotoGP winner: (Spain) Jorge Lorenzo ( (Italy) Ducati)
  - Moto2 winner: (Portugal) Miguel Oliveira ( (Austria) KTM)
  - Moto3 winner: (Spain) Jorge Martín ( (Japan) Honda)
- June 17: (Catalonia) 2018 Catalan motorcycle Grand Prix
  - MotoGP winner: (Spain) Jorge Lorenzo ( (Italy) Ducati)
  - Moto2 winner: (France) Fabio Quartararo ( (Italy) Speed Up)
  - Moto3 winner: (Italy) Enea Bastianini ( (Japan) Honda)
- July 1: (Netherlands) 2018 Dutch TT
  - MotoGP winner: (Spain) Marc Márquez ( (Japan) Honda)
  - Moto2 winner: (Italy) Francesco Bagnaia ( (Germany) Kalex)
  - Moto3 winner: (Spain) Jorge Martín ( (Japan) Honda)
- July 15: (Germany) 2018 German motorcycle Grand Prix
  - MotoGP winner: (Spain) Marc Márquez ( (Japan) Honda)
  - Moto2 winner: (South Africa) Brad Binder ( (Austria) KTM)
  - Moto3 winner: (Spain) Jorge Martín ( (Japan) Honda)
- August 5: 2018 Czech Republic motorcycle Grand Prix
  - MotoGP winner: (Italy) Andrea Dovizioso ( (Italy) Ducati)
  - Moto2 winner: (Portugal) Miguel Oliveira ( (Austria) KTM)
  - Moto3 winner: (Italy) Fabio Di Giannantonio ( (Japan) Honda)
- August 12: (Austria) 2018 Austrian motorcycle Grand Prix
  - MotoGP winner: (Spain) Jorge Lorenzo ( (Italy) Ducati)
  - Moto2 winner: (Italy) Francesco Bagnaia ( (Germany) Kalex)
  - Moto3 winner: (Italy) Marco Bezzecchi ( (Austria) KTM)
- August 26: (United Kingdom) 2018 British motorcycle Grand Prix
  - Event cancelled, due to unsafe track conditions.
- September 9: 2018 San Marino and Rimini's Coast motorcycle Grand Prix
  - MotoGP winner: (Italy) Andrea Dovizioso ( (Italy) Ducati)
  - Moto2 winner: (Italy) Francesco Bagnaia ( (Germany) Kalex)
  - Moto3 winner: (Italy) Lorenzo Dalla Porta ( (Japan) Honda)
- September 23: 2018 Aragon motorcycle Grand Prix
  - MotoGP winner: (Spain) Marc Márquez ( (Japan) Honda)
  - Moto2 winner: (South Africa) Brad Binder ( (Austria) KTM)
  - Moto3 winner: (Spain) Jorge Martín ( (Japan) Honda)
- October 7: 2018 Thailand motorcycle Grand Prix
  - MotoGP winner: (Spain) Marc Márquez ( (Japan) Honda)
  - Moto2 winner: (Italy) Francesco Bagnaia ( (Germany) Kalex)
  - Moto3 winner: (Italy) Fabio Di Giannantonio ( (Japan) Honda)
- October 21: (Japan) 2018 Japanese motorcycle Grand Prix
  - MotoGP winner: (Spain) Marc Márquez ( (Japan) Honda)
  - Moto2 winner: (Italy) Francesco Bagnaia ( (Germany) Kalex)
  - Moto3 winner: (Italy) Marco Bezzecchi ( (Austria) KTM)
- October 28: (Australia) 2018 Australian motorcycle Grand Prix
  - MotoGP winner: (Spain) Maverick Viñales ( (Japan) Yamaha)
  - Moto2 winner: (South Africa) Brad Binder ( (Austria) KTM)
  - Moto3 winner: (Spain) Albert Arenas ( (Austria) KTM)
- November 4: (Malaysia) 2018 Malaysian motorcycle Grand Prix
  - MotoGP winner: (Spain) Marc Márquez ( (Japan) Honda)
  - Moto2 winner: (Italy) Luca Marini ( (Germany) Kalex)
  - Moto3 winner: (Spain) Jorge Martín ( (Japan) Honda)
- November 18: 2018 Valencian Community motorcycle Grand Prix (final)
  - MotoGP winner: (Italy) Andrea Dovizioso ( (Italy) Ducati)
  - Moto2 winner: (Portugal) Miguel Oliveira ( (Austria) KTM)
  - Moto3 winner: (Turkey) Can Öncü ( (Austria) KTM)

=== Endurance ===
==== 2018–19 FIA World Endurance Championship ====
- 5 May 2018: (Belgium) 2018 6 Hours of Spa-Francorchamps Winners:
  - LMP1: (Japan) #8 Toyota Gazoo Racing
  - LMP2: (France) #38 Jackie Chan DC Racing
  - GTE Pro: (United States) #66 Ford Chip Ganassi Team UK
  - GTE Am: (United Kingdom) #98 Aston Martin Racing
- 16–17 June 2018: (France) 2018 24 Hours of Le Mans
  - LMP1: (Japan) #8 Toyota Gazoo Racing
  - LMP2: (France) #36 Signatech Alpine Matmut
  - GTE Pro: (Germany) #92 Porsche GT Team
  - GTE Am: (Germany) #77 Dempsey-Proton Racing
- 19 August 2018: (United Kingdom) 2018 6 Hours of Silverstone
  - LMP1: (Switzerland) #3 Rebellion Racing
  - LMP2: (China) #38 Jackie Chan DC Racing
  - GTE Pro: (Italy) #51 AF Corse
  - GTE Am: (Germany) #77 Dempsey-Proton Racing
- 14 October 2018: (Japan) 2018 6 Hours of Fuji
  - LMP1: (Japan) #7 Toyota Gazoo Racing
  - LMP2: (China) #37 Jackie Chan DC Racing
  - GTE Pro: (Germany) #92 Porsche GT Team
  - GTE Am: (Germany) #56 Team Project 1
- 18 November 2018: (China) 2018 6 Hours of Shanghai
  - LMP1: (Japan) #7 Toyota Gazoo Racing
  - LMP2: (China) #38 Jackie Chan DC Racing
  - GTE Pro: (United Kingdom) #95 Aston Martin Racing
  - GTE Am: (Germany) #77 Dempsey-Proton Racing
- 15 March 2019: (United States) 2019 1000 Miles of Sebring
  - LMP1: (Japan) #8 Toyota Gazoo Racing
  - LMP2: (China) #37 Jackie Chan DC Racing
  - GTE Pro: (Germany) #91 Porsche GT Team
  - GTE Am: (Germany) #77 Dempsey-Proton Racing
- 4 May 2019: (Belgium) 2019 6 Hours of Spa-Francorchamps
  - LMP1: (Japan) #8 Toyota Gazoo Racing
  - LMP2: (United States) #31 DragonSpeed
  - GTE Pro: (United Kingdom) #97 Aston Martin Racing
  - GTE Am:
- 15–16 June 2019: (France) 2019 24 Hours of Le Mans (final)
  - LMP1: (Japan) #8 Toyota Gazoo Racing
  - LMP2: (France) #36 Signatech Alpine Matmut
  - GTE Pro: (Italy) #51 AF Corse
  - GTE Am: (Germany) #56 Team Project 1

==== 2017-18 FIM Endurance World Championship ====
- 16–17 September 2017: (France) 2018 Bol d'Or Winners: (France) #94 GTM94 Yamaha
- 21–22 April 2018: 2018 24 Hours of Le Mans Winners: (Japan) #5 F.C.C TSR Honda France
- 12 May 2018: 2018 8 Hours of Slovakia Ring Winners: (Austria) #7 YART Yamaha
- 9 June 2018: (Germany) 2018 Oschersleben 8 Hours Winners: (Japan) #5 F.C.C TSR Honda France
- 29 July 2018: (Japan) 2018 Suzuka 8 Hours (final) Winners: (Japan) #5 F.C.C TSR Honda France

=== 2018 Superbike World Championship ===
- February 24 & 25: #1 in (Australia) Phillip Island
  - Winners: (Italy) Marco Melandri ( (Italy) Aruba.it Racing – Ducati) (2 times)
- March 24 & 25: #2 in (Thailand) Buriram
  - Winners: Race #1: (United Kingdom) Jonathan Rea ( (Japan) Kawasaki Racing Team WorldSBK) / Race #2: (United Kingdom) Chaz Davies ( (Italy) Aruba.it Racing – Ducati)
- April 14 & 15: #3 in (Spain) Aragón
  - Winners: Race #1: (United Kingdom) Jonathan Rea ( (Japan) Kawasaki Racing Team WorldSBK) / Race #2: (United Kingdom) Chaz Davies ( (Italy) Aruba.it Racing – Ducati)
- April 21 & 22: #4 in (Netherlands) Assen
  - Winners: Race #1: (United Kingdom) Jonathan Rea ( (Japan) Kawasaki Racing Team WorldSBK) / Race #2: (United Kingdom) Tom Sykes ( (Japan) Kawasaki Racing Team WorldSBK)
- May 12 & 13: #5 in (Italy) Imola
  - Winners: (Netherlands) Michael van der Mark ( (Japan) Pata Yamaha Official WorldSBK Team) (2 times)
- May 26 & 27: #6 in (United Kingdom) Donington
  - Winners: (United Kingdom) Jonathan Rea ( (Japan) Kawasaki Racing Team WorldSBK) (2 times)
- June 9 & 10: #7 in (Czech Republic) Brno
  - Winners: Race #1: (United Kingdom) Jonathan Rea ( (Japan) Kawasaki Racing Team WorldSBK) / Race #2: (United Kingdom) Alex Lowes ( (Japan) Pata Yamaha Official WorldSBK Team)
- June 23 & 24: #8 in (United States) Laguna Seca
  - Winners: (United Kingdom) Jonathan Rea ( (Japan) Kawasaki Racing Team WorldSBK) (2 times)
- July 7 & 8: #9 in (Italy) Misano
  - Winners: (United Kingdom) Jonathan Rea ( (Japan) Kawasaki Racing Team WorldSBK) (2 times)
- September 15 & 16: #10 in (Portugal) Algarve
  - Winners: (United Kingdom) Jonathan Rea ( (Japan) Kawasaki Racing Team WorldSBK) (2 times)
- September 29 & 30: #11 in (France) Magny-Cours
  - Winners: (United Kingdom) Jonathan Rea ( (Japan) Kawasaki Racing Team WorldSBK) (2 times)
- October 13 & 14: #12 in (Argentina) Villicum
  - Winners: (United Kingdom) Jonathan Rea ( (Japan) Kawasaki Racing Team WorldSBK) (2 times)
- October 27 & 28: #13 in (Qatar) Losail (final)
  - Winner: Race #1: (United Kingdom) Jonathan Rea ( (Japan) Kawasaki Racing Team WorldSBK) / Race #2: cancelled

=== Rallying ===
==== 2018 World Rally Championship ====
- January 25 – 28: (Monaco) 2018 Monte Carlo Rally Winner: (France) Sébastien Ogier ( (United Kingdom) M-Sport Ford World Rally Team)
- February 15 – 18: 2018 Rally Sweden Winner: (Belgium) Thierry Neuville ( (South Korea) Hyundai Shell Mobis WRT)
- March 8 – 11: 2018 Rally Mexico Winner: (France) Sébastien Ogier ( (United Kingdom) M-Sport Ford World Rally Team)
- April 5 – 8: (France) 2018 Tour de Corse Winner: (France) Sébastien Ogier ( (United Kingdom) M-Sport Ford World Rally Team)
- April 26 – 29: 2018 Rally Argentina Winner: (Estonia) Ott Tänak ( (Japan) Toyota Gazoo Racing WRT)
- May 16 – 20: 2018 Rally de Portugal Winner: (Belgium) Thierry Neuville ( (South Korea) Hyundai Shell Mobis WRT)
- June 7 – 10: (Italy) 2018 Rally d'Italia Winner: (Belgium) Thierry Neuville ( (South Korea) Hyundai Shell Mobis WRT)
- July 26 – 29: 2018 Rally Finland Winner: (Estonia) Ott Tänak ( (Japan) Toyota Gazoo Racing WRT)
- August 16 – 19: (Germany) 2018 Rallye Deutschland Winner: (Estonia) Ott Tänak ( (Japan) Toyota Gazoo Racing WRT)
- September 13 – 16: 2018 Rally of Turkey Winner: (Estonia) Ott Tänak ( (Japan) Toyota Gazoo Racing WRT)
- October 4 – 7: (United Kingdom) 2018 Wales Rally GB Winner: (France) Sébastien Ogier ( (United Kingdom) M-Sport Ford World Rally Team)
- October 25 – 28: (Spain) 2018 Rally de España Winner: (France) Sébastien Ogier ( (United Kingdom) M-Sport Ford World Rally Team)
- November 15 – 18: 2018 Rally Australia Winner: (Finland) Jari-Matti Latvala ( (Japan) Toyota Gazoo Racing WRT)

==== Dakar Rally ====
- January 6 – 20: 2018 Dakar Rally in Peru, Bolivia and Argentina
  - Cars winner: (Spain) Carlos Sainz (Peugeot)
  - Bikes winner: (Austria) Matthias Walkner (KTM)
  - Quads winner: (Chile) Ignacio Casale (Yamaha)
  - Trucks winner: (Russia) Eduard Nikolaev (Kamaz)
  - UTVs winner: (Brazil) Reinaldo Varela (Can-Am)

== Multi-sport events ==
- February 9 – 25: 2018 Winter Olympics in (South Korea) Pyeongchang
  - Norway & Germany won 14 Olympic gold medals each.
  - Norway won the overall medal tally and took first place, due to winning more silver medals than Germany.
- March 9 – 18: 2018 Winter Paralympics in (South Korea) Pyeongchang
  - United States won both the gold and overall medal tallies.
- March 18 – 24: 2018 Arctic Winter Games in (Northwest Territories) Fort Smith-Hay River
  - Alaska won the gold medal tally. Alberta North won the overall medal tally.
- April 4 – 15: 2018 Commonwealth Games in Gold Coast, Queensland
  - Australia won both the gold and overall medal tallies.
- May 26 – June 8: 2018 South American Games in (Bolivia) Cochabamba
  - Colombia won both the gold and overall medal tallies.
- June 22 – July 1: 2018 Mediterranean Games in (Spain) Tarragona
  - Italy won both the gold and overall medal tallies.
- July 15 – 27: 2018 Micronesian Games in (Federated States of Micronesia) Yap
  - Palau won the gold medal tally. Palau and (Federated States of Micronesia) Pohnpei won 70 overall medals each.
- July 18 – 28: 2018 African Youth Games in (Algeria) Algiers
  - Egypt won both the gold and overall medal tallies.
- July 19 – August 3: 2018 Central American and Caribbean Games in (Colombia) Barranquilla
  - Note: These Games were supposed to be held in Quetzaltenango, but CACSO stripped away the hosting rights from there.
  - Mexico won both the gold and overall medal tallies.
- August 2 – 12: 2018 European Championships in (Germany) Berlin and (United Kingdom) Glasgow (debut event)
  - Russia won the gold medal tally. Great Britain won the overall medal tally.
- August 4 – 12: 2018 Gay Games in (France) Paris
  - For detailed results, click here.
- August 18 – September 2: 2018 Asian Games in (Indonesia) Jakarta and Palembang
  - China won both the gold and overall medal tallies.
- September 7 – 15: 2018 Asia Pacific Masters Games in (Malaysia) / Penang (debut event)
  - For information about the sport, click here. From there, the results of that sport would be listed in the "Result" tab.
- October 6 – 13: 2018 Asian Para Games in (Indonesia) Jakarta
  - China won both the gold and overall medal tallies.
- October 6 – 18: 2018 Summer Youth Olympics in (Argentina) Buenos Aires
  - Russia won both the gold and overall medal tallies.
- November 2 – 11: 2018 Pan Pacific Masters Games in (Australia) Gold Coast
  - For detailed results, click here. (Choose a sport first and go to the results tab there.)

== Netball ==
International tournaments

Date	Tournament	Winners	Runners up
19–21 January	2019 Netball World Cup Regional Qualifier – Europe	Scotland	Northern Ireland
20–28 January	2018 Netball Quad Series (January)	Australia	England
21–24 March	2018 Taini Jamison Trophy Series	Jamaica	New Zealand
5–15 April	2018 Commonwealth Games	England	Australia
24 Aug–2 Sept	2018 AFNA Championships	Trinidad and Tobago	Barbados
1–9 September	2018 Asian Netball Championships	Sri Lanka	Singapore
15–23 September	2018 Netball Quad Series (September)	Australia	England
17–21 September	2018 World University Netball Championship	Uganda	South Africa
7–18 October	2018 Constellation Cup	Australia	New Zealand
27–28 October	2018 Fast5 Netball World Series	New Zealand	Jamaica
27 Nov–1 Dec	2018 Diamond Challenge	South Africa	(South Africa) President's XII

Major national leagues, club tournaments

Host	League/Competition	Winners	Runners up
Australia	Suncorp Super Netball	Sunshine Coast Lightning	West Coast Fever
New Zealand	ANZ Premiership	Southern Steel	Central Pulse
New Zealand	Super Club	Central Pulse	Mainland Tactix
United Kingdom	Netball Superleague	Wasps Netball	Loughborough Lightning

== Pickleball ==
- July 20: Bainbridge Cup held in Montesilvano, Italy, played concurrently with the Italian Open Pickleball Championships
- November 2 – 11: 2018 Margaritaville USA Pickleball National Championships in Indian Wells, California

== Real tennis ==
- April 22–28: (United Kingdom) 2018 Real Tennis World Championship at Queen's Club, London
  - (Australia) Robert Fahey defeated (United States) Camden Riviere 7 sets to 5

== Roller sports ==
=== World and Continental Championships ===
- July 15 – 22: 2018 CERH European Championship in A Coruña
  - In the final, Spain defeated Portugal, 6–3, to win the 17th the title. Italy took third and France took fourth place.
- 2018 CERH European U-20 Roller Hockey Championship in Portugal
- 2018 Latin Cup in France
- CERH Women's Euro 2018
- October 1 – 10: 1st World University Roller Sports Championships in (Chinese Taipei) Taipei

Artistic

- August 31 – September 8: Junior/Senior/Cadet/Youth European Championships in Portugal
- October 29 – November 3: Cup of Europe in Spain

Speed

- August 17 – 19: 2018 European Speed Skating Championship in (Belgium) Ostend

Track

  - Seniors 300 m Sprint winners: (Germany) Simon Albrecht (m) / (Belgium) Sandrine Tas (f)
  - 10000 m Points elimination winners: (Italy) Daniel Niero (m) / (Italy) Francesca Lollobrigida (f)
  - 500 m Sprint team winners: Spain (Ioseba Fernandez & Patxi Peula) (m) / Italy (Francesca Lollobrigida, Giorgia Bormida, Benedetta Rossini)
  - 15000 m Eliminations winners: (Italy) Daniel Niero (m) / (Italy) Francesca Lollobrigida (f)
  - 500 m Sprint winners: (Germany) Simon Albrecht (m) / (Belgium) Sandrine Tas (f)
  - 1000 m Sprint winners: (Belgium) Mathias Vosté (m) / (Belgium) Sandrine Tas (f)
  - 3000 m Relay winners: Italy (Daniel Niero, Duccio Marsili, Daniele Di Stefano, Giuseppe Bramante) (m) / Belgium (Sandrine Tas, Anke Vos, Stien Vanhoutte)

Road

  - 200 m Sprint winners: (Spain) Ioseba Fernández (m) / (Belgium) Sandrine Tas (f)
  - 10000 m Points winners: (Italy) Daniel Niero (m) / (Belgium) Sandrine Tas (f)
  - 20000 m Elimination winners: (Spain) Patxi Peula (m) / / (Italy) Francesca Lollobrigida (f)
  - Seniors one lap winners: (Spain) Ioseba Fernández (m) / (Belgium) Sandrine Tas (f)

Marathon

  - Seniors Marathon winners: (Belgium) Bart Swings (m) / (France) Chloe Geoffroy (f)

Freestyle

- September 28 – 30: CERS European Freestyle Skating Championships in (Spain) Barcelona

Inline Hockey

- April 5 – 8: 2018 Men European League (final in (France) Rethel)
  - In final, (France) Rethel Ardennes defeated (Italy) HC Milano Quanta, 9–2, to win the title. (Czech Republic) IHC Berounští Medvědi took third and (United Kingdom) Norton Cyclones SHC took fourth place.
- April 26 – 29: 2018 Women European League (final in (Italy) Roana)
  - In final, (Spain) CPLV Panteras defeated (France) Les Phénix de Ris-Orangis, 3–2, to win the title. (Spain) HCR Cent Patins took third and (Italy) Taurus Buja Hockey Club took fourth place.
- July 5 – 8: U18M and U16M European Championships in France
  - U18: In the final, Czech Republic defeated Italy, 8–0, to win the title. France took third and Sweden took fourth place.
  - U16: In the final, Czech Republic defeated Italy, 7–3, to win the title. United Kingdom took third and Sweden took fourth place.

=== CERH ===
- November 4, 2017 – May 13: 2017–18 CERH European League (final four in Portugal)
  - In the final, (Spain) FC Barcelona Hoquei defeated (Portugal) FC Porto, 4–2, to win their 22nd title.
- November 4, 2017 – April 29: 2017–18 CERS Cup (final four in Spain)
  - In the final, (Spain) CE Lleida Llista Blava defeated (Portugal) Óquei Clube de Barcelos, 1–0, after penalties to win their 3rd title. Initial match finished 2–2.
- November 11, 2017 – March 18: 2017–18 CERH Women's European League (final four in Portugal)
  - In the final, (Spain) CP Gijón Solimar defeated (Portugal) S.L. Benfica, 4–3, to win their 5th title.

== Rugby league ==
- January 27 – August 25: 2018 Challenge Cup
  - Catalans Dragons defeated Warrington Wolves, 20–14, to win their 1st Challenge Cup title.
- June 6 – July 11: 2018 State of Origin series
  - New South Wales defeated Queensland, 2 matches out of 3, to win their 14th State of Origin series title.

== Shooting sports ==
=== World and continental shooting events ===
- February 16 – 26: 2018 10m European Shooting Championships in (Hungary) Győr
  - Russia won both the gold and overall medal tallies.
- March 14 – 18: 2018 World University Shooting Championship in (Malaysia) Kuala Lumpur
  - Italy won the gold medal tally. Russia won the overall medal tally.
- May 1–12: 2018 World Shooting Para Sport Championships in (South Korea) Cheongju
  - For results, click here.
- May 29 – June 7: 2018 CISM World Military Shooting Championship in (Switzerland) Thun
  - China won both the gold and overall medal tallies.
- July 30 – August 13: 2018 European Shotgun Championship in (Austria) Leobersdorf
  - Senior & Junior: Italy won both the gold and overall medal tallies.
- September 2 – 14: 2018 ISSF World Shooting Championships in (South Korea) Changwon
  - China won the gold medal tally. Russia won the overall medal tally.
- November 1 – 11: 2018 Shooting Championship of the Americas in (Mexico) Guadalajara
  - United States won both the gold and overall medal tallies.

=== 2018 ISSF World Cup ===
- March 2 – 12: All Guns World Cup #1 in (Mexico) Guadalajara
  - 10 m Air Pistol winners: (India) Shahzar Rizvi (m) / (India) Manu Bhaker (f)
  - 10 m Air Pistol mixed team winners: India (Om Prakash Mitharval & Manu Bhaker)
  - Men's 25 m Rapid Fire Pistol winner: (France) Clement Bessaguet
  - Women's 25 m Pistol winner: (Greece) Anna Korakaki
  - 10 m Air Rifle winners: (Hungary) István Péni (m) / (Romania) Laura-Georgeta Coman (f)
  - 50 m Rifle Three Positions winners: (India) Akhil Sheoran (m) / (China) PEI Ruijiao (f)
  - 10 m Air Rifle mixed team winners: China (XU Hong & CHEN Keduo)
  - Skeet winners: (United States) Vincent Hancock (m) / (United States) Kim Rhode (f)
  - Trap winners: (Luxembourg) Lyndon Sosa (m) / (United States) Ashley Carroll (f)
  - Trap mixed team winners: Finland (Satu Mäkelä-Nummela & Vesa Tornroos)
- March 19 – 29: 2018 Junior World Cup (All Guns) #1 in (Australia) Sydney
  - Junior 10 m Air Pistol winners: (China) WANG Zhehao (m) / (India) Manu Bhaker (f)
  - Men's Junior 25 m Rapid Fire Pistol winner: (India) Anish Anish
  - Women's Junior 25 m Pistol winner: (India) Muskan Muskan
  - Junior 10 m Air Pistol Mixed team winners: India (Anmol Anmol & Manu Bhaker)
  - Junior 10 m Air Rifle winners: (China) LIU Yuqi (m) / (India) Elavenil Valarivan (f)
  - Men's Junior 50 m Rifle Three Positions winner: (China) ZHANG Changhong
  - Junior 10 m Air Rifle Mixed team winners: China (ZHU Yingjie & LIU Yuqi)
  - Junior Trap winners: (Italy) Matteo Marongiu (m) / (China) DUAN Yuwei (f)
  - Junior Skeet winners: (China) DOU Xuyang (m) / (Australia) Aislin Jones (f)
  - Junior Trap Mixed team winners: Italy (Teo Petroni & Erica Sessa)
- April 20 – 30: All Guns World Cup #2 (final) in (South Korea) Changwon
  - 10 m Air Pistol winners: (Russia) Artem Chernousov (m) / (Belarus) Viktoria Chaika (f)
  - 10 m Air Pistol Mixed team winners: China (JI Xiaojing & WU Jiayu)
  - Men's 25 m Rapid Fire Pistol winner: (South Korea) Kim Jun-hong
  - Women's 25 m Pistol winner: (Australia) Elena Galiabovitch
  - 10 m Air Rifle winners: (Russia) Alexander Dryagin (m) / (China) ZHAO Ruozhu (f)
  - 10 m Air Rifle Mixed team winners: China (ZHAO Ruozhu & Yang Haoran)
  - 50 m Rifle Three Positions winners: (Russia) Sergey Kamenskiy (m) / (China) WANG Zeru (f)
  - Trap winners: (Italy) Mauro de Filippis (m) / (Finland) Satu Mäkelä-Nummela (f)
  - Mixed Trap winners: Slovakia (Erik Varga & Zuzana Štefečeková)
  - Skeet winners: (United States) Vincent Hancock (m) / (United States) Kim Rhode (f)
- May 7 – 15: Rifle and Pistol World Cup #1 in (United States) Fort Benning
  - 10 m Air Pistol winners: (China) WU Jiayu (m) / (Greece) Anna Korakaki (f)
  - 10 m Air Pistol Mixed team winners: Spain (Pablo Carrera & Sonia Franquet)
  - Men's 25 m Rapid Fire Pistol winner: (China) LIN Junmin
  - Women's 25 m Pistol winner: (Bulgaria) Maria Grozdeva
  - 10 m Air Rifle winners: (Germany) Julian Justus (m) / (China) WU Mingyang (f)
  - 10 m Air Rifle Mixed team winners: China (WU Mingyang & YAO Yuncong)
  - 50 m Rifle Three Positions winners: (Hungary) István Péni (m) / (Croatia) Snježana Pejčić (f)
- May 22 – 29: Rifle and Pistol World Cup #2 (final) in (Germany) Munich
  - 10 m Air Pistol winners: (Ukraine) Oleh Omelchuk (m) / (Ukraine) Olena Kostevych (f)
  - 10 m Air Pistol Mixed team winners: Ukraine (Olena Kostevych & Oleh Omelchuk)
  - Men's 25 m Rapid Fire Pistol winner: (China) LIN Junmin
  - Women's 25 m Pistol winner: (China) XIONG Yaxuan
  - 10 m Air Rifle winners: (Belarus) Illia Charheika (m) / (Chinese Taipei) LIN Ying-Shin (f)
  - 10 m Air Rifle Mixed team winners: Russia (Anastasiia Galashina & Sergey Kamenskiy)
  - 50 m Rifle Three Positions winners: (China) Yang Haoran (m) / (Iran) Elaheh Ahmadi (f)
- June 5 – 15: Shotgun World Cup #1 in (Malta) Siġġiewi
  - Skeet winners: (United States) Vincent Hancock (m) / (United Kingdom) Amber Hill (f)
  - Trap winners: (United Kingdom) Aaron Heading (m) / (Finland) Satu Mäkelä-Nummela (f)
  - Mixed Trap winners: Slovakia (Erik Varga & Zuzana Štefečeková)
- June 22 – 29: 2018 Junior World Cup (All Guns) #2 (final) in (Germany) Suhl
  - Junior 10 m Air Pistol winners: (India) Chaudhary Saurabh (m) / (India) Manu Bhaker (f)
  - Junior 10 m Air Pistol Mixed team winners: India (Devanshi Rana & Chaudhary Saurabh)
  - Junior 25 m Pistol winners: (Latvia) Ernests Erbs (m) / (France) Camille Jedrzejewski (f)
  - Junior 25 m Standard Pistol winners (India) Vijayveer Sidhu (m) / (India) Vishwa Jignesh Dahiya (f)
  - Junior 50 m Pistol winners: (Russia) Mikhail Isakov (m) / (Belarus) Yulyana Rohach (f)
  - Junior Men's 25 m Rapid Fire Pistol winner: (Czech Republic) Matej Rampula
  - Junior 10 m Air Rifle winners: (India) Hriday Hazarika (m) / (India) Elavenil Valarivan (f)
  - Junior 10 m Air Rifle Mixed team winners: India (Elavenil Valarivan & Divyansh Singh Panwar)
  - Junior 50 m Rifle Prone winners: (United States) William Shaner (m) / (United States) Morgan Phillips (f)
  - Junior 50 m Rifle Three Positions winners: (Italy) Marco Suppini (m) / (China) WANG Zeru (f)
  - Junior Skeet winners: (Denmark) Emil Kjelgaard Petersen (m) / (Slovakia) Vanesa Hockova (f)
  - Junior Trap winners: (Spain) Adria Martinez Torres (m) / (Italy) Gaia Ragazzini (f)
  - Junior Trap Mixed team winners: Italy (Erica Sessa & Teo Petroni)
- July 9 – 19: Shotgun World Cup #2 (final) in Tucson, Arizona
  - Skeet winners: (South Korea) LEE Jong-jun (m) / (United States) Kim Rhode (f)
  - Trap winners: (Italy) Simone Lorenzo Prosperi (m) / (Finland) Marika Salmi (f)
  - Mixed Trap winners: United States (Corey Cogdell & Casey Wallace)

== Softball ==
=== WBSC ===
- February 1 – 4: 2018 Asia-Pacific Softball Cup in Blacktown
  - Japan defeated Australia, 3–0, in the final. China took third place.
- April 23 – 28: 2018 Asian Men's Softball Championship in (Indonesia) Jakarta
  - Japan defeated Philippines, 4–0, to win their seventh consecutive and eighth overall Asian Men's Softball Championship title.
  - Singapore took third place.
- May 13 – 18: 2018 Asian Junior Women's Softball Championship in (Philippines) Pampanga
  - Japan defeated Chinese Taipei to win their fourth Asian Junior Women's Softball Championship title.
  - China took third place.
- June 12 – 15: 2018 East Asian Women's Softball Cup in Nantou City
  - Japan defeated Chinese Taipei, 7–3, in the final.
  - South Korea took third place.
- June 25 – 30: 2018 European Men's Softball Championship in Havlíčkův Brod
  - Champions: Czech Republic; Second: Netherlands; Third: Denmark
- July 7 – 15: 2018 Junior Men's Softball World Championship in (Canada) Prince Albert
  - Australia defeated Japan, 6–1, to win their fifth Junior Men's Softball World Championship title.
  - New Zealand took third place.
- July 16 – 21: 2018 European U19 Women's Softball Championship in Staranzano
  - Italy defeated Ireland, 7–3, in the final. Czech Republic took third place.
- July 23 – 28: 2018 European U22 Women's Softball Championship in (Slovakia) Trnava
  - Italy defeated Netherlands, 5–4, in the final. Ireland took third place.
- August 2 – 12: 2018 Women's Softball World Championship in Chiba
  - The United States defeated Japan, 7–6, to win their second consecutive and eleventh overall Women's Softball World Championship title.
  - Canada took the bronze medal.
  - Note: The United States has qualified to compete at the 2020 Summer Olympics.
- October 26 & 27: 2018 Asian University Women's Softball Championship in (China) Nanjing

=== Little League Softball World Series ===
- July 29 – August 4: 2018 Junior League Softball World Series in (Washington (state)) Kirkland at Everest Park
  - The (Utah) Snow Canyon Little League (USA West) defeated the (Texas) Smithville Little League (USA Southwest), 9–3, in the final.
- July 30 – August 5: 2018 Senior League Softball World Series in (Delaware) Roxana at Lower Sussex Little League Complex
  - Team (Philippines) Tanauan (Asia-Pacific) defeated team (Texas) Waco (USA Southwest), 7–0, in the final.
- August 8 – 15: 2018 Little League Softball World Series in (Oregon) Portland at Alpenrose Stadium
  - Team (Ohio) Wheelersburg LL (Central) defeated team (Pennsylvania) Tunkhannock LL (East), 3–0, in the final.
