= First Belarusian round-the-world flight =

The first Belarusian round-the-world flight was conducted from 18 August to 15 September 2018 by a team of two aviators of Belarus.

The flight was made on a Cessna 182 Skylane modified to hold extra fuel, and covered 30,000 kilometers in 145 flying hours, over 30 flight days, landing in 10 countries. Alexander Tsenter and Andrey Borisevich became the first Belarusian pilots to fly around the world. The captain Alexandr Tsenter is the chairman of the Belarusian Federation of Air Sports, and co-pilot Andrey Borisevich is the head of SkyEagle Aviation Academy in Florida, the United States.

Flying across Russia was a challenge for pilots. Pilots had to send barrels of gasoline to projected landing points ahead of their trip. Russian air traffic control demanded their estimated distance from three points ahead, while some locations were not marked on the maps of pilots and from time to time there was no cell phone service in Syberian remote areas.

== Itinerary ==
The flight traveled largely from West to East, beginning in Belarus on 18 August 2018 and returning to its start point on 15 September 2018. It flew northeast via Russia to the United States and then across the Atlantic Ocean and Europe.

Detailed itinerary (airport name and ICAO code): Lipki (UMMI) — Mahilyow (UMOO) — Ostafyevo (UUMO) — Bogorodsk (XUDK) — Pervushino (UWUO) — Kalachyovo (UNOL) — Mochishche (UNNM) — Yemelyanovo (UNKK) — Mostovoy (UIBM) — Irkutsk (UIII) — Kadala (UIAA) — Tynda (UHBW) — Ayan (UHNA) — Sokol (UHMM) — Ugolny (UHMA) — Provideniya Bay (UHMD) — Nome (PAOM) — Talkeetna (PATK) — Juneau (PAJN) — Ketchikan (PAKT) — Renton (KRNT) — Billings Logan (KBIL) — Yellowstone (KWYS) — Lake Tahoe (KTVL) — Mariposa-Yosemite (KMPI) — Page (KPGA) — Cheyenne (KCYS) — Dane (KMSN) — Greater Rochester (KROC) — Nashua (KASH) — Bangor (KBGR) — Goose Bay (CYYR) — Narsarsuaq (BGBW) — Reykjavík (BIRK) — Vágar (EKVG) — Wick (EGPC) — Schönhagen (EDAZ) — Warsaw Modlin (EPMO) — Minsk (UMMS) — Lipki (UMMI).

== See also ==
- First aerial circumnavigation
- List of circumnavigations: Aircraft
