= Belarusian Federation of Air Sports =

Sports governing body in Belarus

- Sport: Air sports
- Jurisdiction: Belarus
- Abbreviation: BFAS
- Affiliation: FAI (suspended)
- Regional affiliation: Europe
- Headquarters: Minsk
- Chairman: Alexander Tsenter
- Secretary: Anton Bystrov

Official website
- bfas.by
- (Belarus)

The Вelarusian Federation of Air Sports (BFAS; Belarusian: Беларуская федэрацыя авіяцыйнага спорту) is a non-profit organization and a member of the Fédération Aéronautique Internationale (FAI).

The FAI suspended Belarus due to the 2022 Russian invasion of Ukraine, as a result of which pilots from Belarus will not be able to compete in any FAI-sanctioned event in the 13 FAI air sports disciplines, including paragliding, hang gliding. and paramotoring.

As of 14 May 2018 BFAS had 265 individual members.

The Вelarusian Federation of Air Sports is the national governing and coordinating body of air sport and recreational flying. The BFAS was the issuer of FAI sporting licences in Belarus.

The Вelarusian Federation of Air Sports organized the 2018 World Helicopter Championship in July 2018 near Minsk, Belarus. The BFAS also organized the first Belarusian round-the-world flight from 18 August to 15 September 2018.
