= Lina Chatkevičiūtė =

Lithuanian ballroom dancer

Medal record

Dance sport

Representing Lithuania

World Championships
Silver medal – second place	2015 Leipzig	Standard
Silver medal – second place	2018 Moscow	Standard

European Championships
Gold medal – first place	2014 Vienna	Show Dance
Gold medal – first place	2018 St Peteresburg	Standard
Silver medal – second place	2013 Leipzig	Standard
Silver medal – second place	2016 Cambrils	Standard
Silver medal – second place	2017 Prague	Standard
Bronze medal – third place	2011 Mons	Standard
Bronze medal – third place	2012 Velenje	Standard
Bronze medal – third place	2014 Magdeburg	Standard
Bronze medal – third place	2015 Copenhagen	Standard

European Union Championships
Gold medal – first place	2006 Brno	Standard
Silver medal – second place	2007 Linz	Standard

Lina Chatkevičiūtė (born 1981) is a Lithuanian professional ballroom dancer. Her current partner is Donatas Vėželis.

In 2014, they won their first European title in standard show dance.

== Awards ==
In 2016 Lithuanian Sports department awarded Lina Chatkevičiūtė for merits in Lithuanian sport.

== Personal life ==
In 2014 Chatkevičiūtė married her dancing partner Donatas Vėželis.
