= 2018 World Helicopter Championship =

16th World Helicopter Championship 29 July 2018

- Host city: Minsk
- Country: Belarus
- Nations: 7
- Teams: 36
- Opening: 23 July 2018
- Closing: 29 July 2018
- Website: whc2018.by

The 2018 World Helicopter Championship was the 16th World Helicopter Championship, held from 23 to 29 July 2018 near Minsk, Belarus. Competitions were organized by the Belarusian Federation of Air Sports under the auspices of the Fédération Aéronautique Internationale.

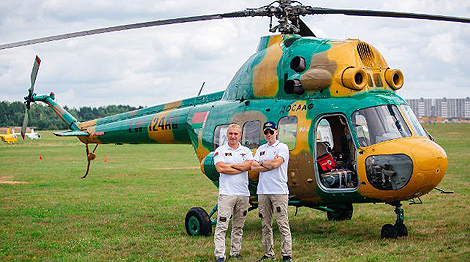
Photo of Belarus’ Aleksei Mochansky and Anton Danchenko. The Bronze winners of the 2018 FAI World Helicopter Championship, 27 July 2018

Taking part in the competitions were 36 crews from 7 countries, including Austria, Belarus, China, Germany, Poland, Russia, and Ukraine. Belarusian national teams performed on Mi-2 and Robinson R44 helicopters.

The members of the crews competed in navigation, parallel precision flying, parallel fender rigging, and parallel slalom heli-race events.

Russia took gold in the team standings, Belarus finished second, and Poland came in third.

The annual aviation festival #ProNebo was held as a part of the championship on 28–29 July. Visitors could see more than 30 aircraft, including airplanes, helicopters, and hot air balloons. Helicopter racing was one of the most spectacular events of the festival.

== Results ==
Team Overall:

1. Russia
  Sotnikov Maxim & Puajukas Аlеh
  Orekhov Апdrеу & Sazonov Vadim
  Kоrоtаеч Viktor & Ziablikov Vladimir
2. Belarus
  Machanski Aliaksei & Dапсhапkа Anton
  Tsenter Alaxandel & Striyonock Vladimir
  Buhaveu Jladzimir & Rogonov Andrei
3. Poland
  Marcin Szamborski & Szamborski Michal
  Kończalski Bartosz & Komosa Sebastian
  Wilk Piotr & Mytar Маrсiп
- Navigation winners: Poland (Marcin Szamborski & Michał Szamborski)
- Parallel Precision Flying winners: Russia (Andrey Orekhov & Vadim Sazonov)
- Parallel Fender Rigging winners: Belarus (Uladzimir Buhayeu & Andrei Rogonov)
- Parallel Slalom winners: Russia (Maxim Sotnikov & Aleh Puajukas)
