= 2021 Austria Open =

9-Ball pool tournament, June 2021

2021 Dynamic Billard St. Johann im Pongau Open
Tournament information
- Dates: 17–20 June
- Venue: Alpina, Wellness & Sporthotel
- City: Sankt Johann im Pongau
- Country: Austria
- Organisation: Euro Tour
- Format: Single elimination, double-elimination
- Total prize fund: €38,000
- Winner's share: €4,500
- Defending champion: Eklent Kaçi (ALB)

Final
- Champion: Joshua Filler (GER)
- Runner-up: Mario He (AUT)
- Score: 9–8

The 2021 Dynamic Billard St. Johann im Pongau Open (Note: also known as the 2021 Austria Open) was a professional nine-ball pool tournament, the first Euro Tour event of 2021. It took place from the 17th to the 20th June 2021 in the Alpina, Wellness & Sporthotel in St Johann im Pongau, Austria. The event had a total prize pool of €38,000, with the winner of each event receiving €4,500. Since the 2020 Treviso Open there had not been any Euro Tour events, having been postponed due to the COVID-19 pandemic.

The defending champion was Eklent Kaçi, who did not participate at the event. The winner of the men's event was Joshua Filler, who defeated Mario He in the final 9–8.

== Format ==
The St. Johann im Pongau Open was played as a double-elimination knockout tournament, until the round of 32. From that point on, the event continued as a single elimination bracket. All matches were played as a race-to-nine-racks under the alternative break format. The event had a total of 181 entrants.

=== Prize fund ===
The tournament prize fund was similar to that of other Euro Tour events; €4,500 was awarded to the winner of the event.

Place	Prize money
Winner	€4,500
Finalist	€3,000
Semi finalist	€1,750
Quarter finalist	€1,250
last 16	€1,000
Last 32	€600
33–48	€275
Total	€38,000

== Knockout rounds ==
1st Round
1	(Germany) Joshua Filler	9
32	(Netherlands) Jan van Lierop	4
17	(Bosnia and Herzegovina) Sanjin Pehlivanović	9
16	(Belgium) Cliff Castelein	6
9	(Poland) Mateusz Śniegocki	9
24	(Czech Republic) Roman Hybler	6
25	(Greece) Alexander Kazakis	9
8	(Germany) Thorsten Hohmann	4
5	(Spain) Francisco Sánchez Ruiz	9
28	(Slovakia) Jakub Koniar	7
21	(Poland) Tomasz Kapłan	9
12	(Germany) Fitim Haradinaj	6
13	(Cyprus) Anthony Brabin	6
20	(Poland) Radosław Babica	9
29	(Poland) Wojciech Szewczyk	9
4	(Poland) Mieszko Fortuński	5
3	(Russia) Ruslan Chinakhov	9
30	(Bulgaria) Georgi Georgiew	5
19	(Spain) David Alcaide	9
14	(Greece) Christos Papageorgiou	4
11	(Poland) Konrad Juszczyszyn	9
22	(Germany) Tobias Bongers	5
27	(Austria) Maximilian Lechner	5
6	(Poland) Wiktor Zieliński	9
7	(Spain) José Delgado	9
26	(Hungary) Olivér Szolnoki	7
23	(Netherlands) Marc Bijsterbosch	2
10	(Greece) Nikos Ekonomopoulos	9
15	(Estonia) Denis Grabe	4
18	(Austria) Albin Ouschan	9
31	(Switzerland) Michael Schneider	4
2	(Austria) Mario He	9

2nd Round
(Germany) Joshua Filler	9
(Bosnia and Herzegovina) Sanjin Pehlivanović	2
(Poland) Mateusz Śniegocki	7
(Greece) Alexander Kazakis	9
(Spain) Francisco Sánchez Ruiz	9
(Poland) Tomasz Kapłan	5
(Poland) Radosław Babica	3
(Poland) Wojciech Szewczyk	9
(Russia) Ruslan Chinakhov	7
(Spain) David Alcaide	9
(Poland) Konrad Juszczyszyn	2
(Poland) Wiktor Zieliński	9
(Spain) José Delgado	9
(Greece) Nikos Ekonomopoulos	8
(Austria) Albin Ouschan	8
(Austria) Mario He	9

Quarterfinals
(Germany) Joshua Filler	9
(Greece) Alexander Kazakis	8
(Spain) Francisco Sánchez Ruiz	9
(Poland) Wojciech Szewczyk	5
(Spain) David Alcaide	9
(Poland) Wiktor Zieliński	7
(Spain) José Delgado	3
(Austria) Mario He	9

Semifinals
(Germany) Joshua Filler	9
(Spain) Francisco Sánchez Ruiz	6
(Spain) David Alcaide	5
(Austria) Mario He	9

Finals
(Germany) Joshua Filler	9
(Austria) Mario He	8
