= 2016 WPA World Nine-ball Championship =

9-Ball Pool world championship, held July/August 2016

WPA World 9-Ball Championship 2016
Tournament information
- Sport: 9-ball
- Location: al-Arabi Sports Club, Doha, Qatar
- Dates: July 30, 2016–August 4, 2016
- Tournament format: Double elimination / Single elimination
- Host: WPA World Nine-ball Championship
- Participants: 128

Final positions
- Champion: (Austria) Albin Ouschan
- Runner-up: (United States) Shane Van Boening

The 2016 WPA World Nine-ball Championship was the 25th edition of the 9-Ball pool World Championships. It took place from July 30 to August 4, 2016, in the al-Attiya Sports Arena of the Al-Arabi Sports Club in Doha. The Qatari capital was the seventh time in a row the venue for the 9-Ball Championships.

Albin Ouschan defeated American Shane Van Boening 13–6 in the final and became the first Austrian 9-ball world champion. This was the third Austrian World pool champion, after Gerda Hofstätter won the Women's WPA World Nine-ball Championship in 1995, and Oushchan's sister Jasmine Ouschan who won the WPA World Ten-Ball Championship in 2010.

The defending champion was Taiwanese player Ko Pin-yi, who lost to Jayson Shaw in the last 64.

== Format ==
The tournament was attended by 128 players, of which the top 24 players in the world rankings qualified automatically. A total of 92 starting places were awarded according to a quota by the continental and regional associations as well as the hosting Qatari association and event sponsors. From July 25 to 28, 2016, a qualifying tournament was held in which 128 participants played in three knockout competitions for the remaining 12 starting places.

In the main tournament, the 128 participants were first divided into 16 groups of 8 players and competed there from July 30 to August 1 in the double knockout system against each other. Four players in each group qualified for the final round. This took place from August 2 to 4 and was played in the knockout system.

The event was played in the change break format, and with the triangle of balls were moved up the table, so that the 9-ball was placed where the 1 ball would usually be placed.

== Prize money ==
	Amount
Winner	$40.000
Runner Up	$20.000
Semifinal	$8.000
Quarter final	$5.000
Last 16	$3.000
Last 32	$2.000
Last 64	$1.500
65.–96. Place	$500
Total	200.000

== Preliminary round ==
=== Group 1 ===
Main Round
(Chinese Taipei) Ko Pin-yi	9
(Algeria) Mohamed Elraousti	1
(Lebanon) Mazen Berjuai	5
(Austria) Mario He	9
(India) Shahbaz Adil Khan	4
(Germany) Thorsten Hohmann	9
(South Korea) Jeong Young-hwa	9
(Qatar) Waleed Majid	5
1st playoff round
(Algeria) Mohamed Elraousti	3
(Lebanon) Mazen Berjuai	9
(India) Shahbaz Adil Khan	7
(Qatar) Waleed Majid	9

Winner’s Round
(Chinese Taipei) Ko Pin-yi	9
(Austria) Mario He	5
(Germany) Thorsten Hohmann	9
(South Korea) Jeong Young-hwa	7
2nd playoff round
(Lebanon) Mazen Berjuai	1
(South Korea) Jeong Young-hwa	9
(Qatar) Waleed Majid	4
(Austria) Mario He	9

=== Group 2 ===
Main Round
(Chinese Taipei) Chang Jung-lin	9
(Hong Kong) Lo Ho Sum	5
(Philippines) Jeffrey Ignacio	9
(Poland) Karol Skowerski	4
(Finland) Petri Makkonen	9
(Qatar) Abdul Aziz Alawadhi	0
(Canada) Francis Crevier	8
(Philippines) Johann Chua	9
1st playoff round
(Hong Kong) Lo Ho Sum	5
(Poland) Karol Skowerski	9
(Qatar) Abdul Aziz Alawadhi	2
(Canada) Francis Crevier	9

Winner’s Round
(Chinese Taipei) Chang Jung-lin	9
(Philippines) Jeffrey Ignacio	7
(Finland) Petri Makkonen	4
(Philippines) Johann Chua	9
2nd playoff round
(Poland) Karol Skowerski	9
(Finland) Petri Makkonen	6
(Canada) Francis Crevier	7
(Philippines) Jeffrey Ignacio	9

=== Group 3 ===
Main Round
(England) Darren Appleton	9
(Italy) Bruno Muratore	4
(Chinese Taipei) Chu Hong-ming	9
(Portugal) Henrique Correia	2
(Bangladesh) MD Almin	9
(Sweden) Marcus Chamat	4
(Kuwait) Omar Al-Shaheen	4
(Russia) Ruslan Chinakhov	9
1st playoff round
(Italy) Bruno Muratore	9
(Portugal) Henrique Correia	5
(Sweden) Marcus Chamat	4
(Kuwait) Omar Al-Shaheen	9

Winner’s Round
(England) Darren Appleton	6
(Chinese Taipei) Chu Hong-ming	9
(Bangladesh) MD Almin	4
(Russia) Ruslan Chinakhov	9
2nd playoff round
(Italy) Bruno Muratore	8
(Bangladesh) MD Almin	9
(Kuwait) Omar Al-Shaheen	9
(England) Darren Appleton	5

=== Group 4 ===
Main Round
(Singapore) Aloysius Yapp	8
(Spain) Francisco Sánchez Ruiz	9
(England) Daryl Peach	6
(Peru) Christopher Tevez	9
(Saudi Arabia) Mohannad al-Ghumayz	7
(Qatar) Antonio Gabica	9
(Philippines) Roberto Gomez	6
(Austria) Albin Ouschan	9
1st playoff round
(Singapore) Aloysius Yapp	5
(England) Daryl Peach	9
(Saudi Arabia) Mohannad al-Ghumayz	2
(Philippines) Roberto Gomez	9

Winner’s Round
(Spain) Francisco Sánchez Ruiz	9
(Peru) Christopher Tevez	5
(Qatar) Antonio Gabica	8
(Austria) Albin Ouschan	9
2nd playoff round
(England) Daryl Peach	9
(Qatar) Antonio Gabica	7
(Philippines) Roberto Gomez	9
(Peru) Christopher Tevez	3

=== Group 5 ===
Main Round
(Canada) John Morra	9
(Ukraine) Artem Koshovyi	5
(China) Zhou Long	9
(Japan) Aoki Ryoji	2
(Canada) Alex Pagulayan	9
(Kuwait) Mohammad al-Kashawi	5
(Vietnam) Lương Chí Dũng	9
(Chinese Taipei) Yang Ching-shun	8
1st playoff round
(Ukraine) Artem Koshovyi	9
(Japan) Aoki Ryoji	8
(Kuwait) Mohammad al-Kashawi	4
(Chinese Taipei) Yang Ching-shun	9

Winner’s Round
(Canada) John Morra	2
(China) Zhou Long	9
(Canada) Alex Pagulayan	9
(Vietnam) Lương Chí Dũng	4
2nd playoff round
(Ukraine) Artem Koshovyi	9
(Vietnam) Lương Chí Dũng	8
(Chinese Taipei) Yang Ching-shun	9
(Canada) John Morra	6

=== Group 6 ===
Main Round
(England) Karl Boyes	9
(Qatar) Mohammed Saeed	5
(Japan) Naoyuki Ōi	8
(Eritrea) Hamzaa Saeed Ali	9
(Iran) Armin Mahmoudi	5
(Singapore) Toh Lian Han	9
(Philippines) Jeff de Luna	9
(China) Wang Can	6
1st playoff round
(Qatar) Mohammed Saeed	2
(Japan) Naoyuki Ōi	9
(Iran) Armin Mahmoudi	7
(China) Wang Can	9

Winner’s Round
(England) Karl Boyes	9
(Eritrea) Hamzaa Saeed Ali	3
(Singapore) Toh Lian Han	9
(Philippines) Jeff de Luna	6
2nd playoff round
(Japan) Naoyuki Ōi	1
(Philippines) Jeff de Luna	9
(China) Wang Can	7
(Eritrea) Hamzaa Saeed Ali	9

=== Group 7 ===
Main Round
(Philippines) Dennis Orcollo	9
(United Arab Emirates) Abdullah Karmastaji	5
(England) Imran Majid	6
(Philippines) Ramil Gallego	9
(Indonesia) Irsal Nasution	9
(Qatar) Ali Abdulhadi Almeri	2
(Germany) Christian Götemann	4
(Spain) David Alcaide	9
1st playoff round
(United Arab Emirates) Abdullah Karmastaji	2
(England) Imran Majid	9
(Qatar) Ali Abdulhadi Almeri	6
(Germany) Christian Götemann	9

Winner’s Round
(Philippines) Dennis Orcollo	4
(Philippines) Ramil Gallego	9
(Indonesia) Irsal Nasution	8
(Spain) David Alcaide	9
2nd playoff round
(England) Imran Majid	5
(Indonesia) Irsal Nasution	9
(Germany) Christian Götemann	7
(Philippines) Dennis Orcollo	9

=== Group 8 ===
Main Round
(Greece) Nikos Ekonomopoulos	9
(Poland) Konrad Juszczyszyn	3
(Scotland) Jayson Shaw	9
(Iraq) Karar Abdulwahed	3
(Australia) Justin Campbell	7
(Saudi Arabia) Abdul Rahman al-Amar	9
(United States) Robert Hart	1
(Chinese Taipei) Ko Ping-chung	9
1st playoff round
(Poland) Konrad Juszczyszyn	9
(Iraq) Karar Abdulwahed	5
(Australia) Justin Campbell	9
(United States) Robert Hart	2

Winner’s Round
(Greece) Nikos Ekonomopoulos	9
(Scotland) Jayson Shaw	5
(Saudi Arabia) Abdul Rahman al-Amar	8
(Chinese Taipei) Ko Ping-chung	9
2nd playoff round
(Poland) Konrad Juszczyszyn	8
(Saudi Arabia) Abdul Rahman al-Amar	9
(Australia) Justin Campbell	7
(Scotland) Jayson Shaw	9

=== Group 9 ===
Main Round
(China) Liu Haitao	9
(Hong Kong) Andrew Kong Bu Hong	6
(Venezuela) Jalal Yousef	9
(United States) Shaun Wilkie	6
(Netherlands) Niels Feijen	9
(Qatar) Abdul Latif al-Fawal	3
(Japan) Satoshi Kawabata	7
(Greece) Alexander Kazakis	9
1st playoff round
(Hong Kong) Andrew Kong Bu Hong	1
(United States) Shaun Wilkie	9
(Qatar) Abdul Latif al-Fawal	6
(Japan) Satoshi Kawabata	9

Winner’s Round
(China) Liu Haitao	9
(Venezuela) Jalal Yousef	1
(Netherlands) Niels Feijen	6
(Greece) Alexander Kazakis	9
2nd playoff round
(United States) Shaun Wilkie	3
(Netherlands) Niels Feijen	9
(Japan) Satoshi Kawabata	9
(Venezuela) Jalal Yousef	7

=== Group 10 ===
Main Round
(China) Chu Bingjie	9
(Algeria) Nadim Okbani	3
(Japan) Hiroshi Takenaka	5
(Mexico) Rubén Bautista	9
(Chinese Taipei) Hsieh Chia-chen	9
(Poland) Mieszko Fortuński	7
(Iran) Ali Maghsoud	9
(Finland) Mika Immonen	8
1st playoff round
(Algeria) Nadim Okbani	3
(Japan) Hiroshi Takenaka	9
(Poland) Mieszko Fortuński	9
(Finland) Mika Immonen	4

Winner’s Round
(China) Chu Bingjie	9
(Mexico) Rubén Bautista	1
(Chinese Taipei) Hsieh Chia-chen	9
(Iran) Ali Maghsoud	5
2nd playoff round
(Japan) Hiroshi Takenaka	7
(Iran) Ali Maghsoud	9
(Poland) Mieszko Fortuński	9
(Mexico) Rubén Bautista	5

=== Group 11 ===
Main Round
(Philippines) Warren Kiamco	9
(United Arab Emirates) Omran Salem	5
(Germany) Oliver Ortmann	9
(United States) Skyler Woodward	5
(Bangladesh) Sayeem Hossain	2
(Poland) Wojciech Szewczyk	9
(Chinese Taipei) Wu Kun-lin	9
(Germany) Ralf Souquet	6
1st playoff round
(United Arab Emirates) Omran Salem	3
(United States) Skyler Woodward	9
(Bangladesh) Sayeem Hossain	4
(Germany) Ralf Souquet	9

Winner’s Round
(Philippines) Warren Kiamco	9
(Germany) Oliver Ortmann	7
(Poland) Wojciech Szewczyk	3
(Chinese Taipei) Wu Kun-lin	9
2nd playoff round
(United States) Skyler Woodward	5
(Poland) Wojciech Szewczyk	9
(Germany) Ralf Souquet	9
(Germany) Oliver Ortmann	7

=== Group 12 ===
Main Round
(Netherlands) Nick van den Berg	7
(Japan) Hayato Hijikata	9
(Kuwait) Abdulla al-Yousif	7
(Spain) Francisco Díaz-Pizarro	9
(Indonesia) Muhammad Simanjuntak	9
(Bahrain) Fahad al-Jassas	7
(Czech Republic) Roman Hybler	9
(Philippines) Carlo Biado	6
1st playoff round
(Netherlands) Nick van den Berg	9
(Kuwait) Abdulla al-Yousif	7
(Bahrain) Fahad al-Jassas	1
(Philippines) Carlo Biado	9

Winner’s Round
(Japan) Hayato Hijikata	3
(Spain) Francisco Díaz-Pizarro	9
(Indonesia) Muhammad Simanjuntak	6
(Czech Republic) Roman Hybler	9
2nd playoff round
(Netherlands) Nick van den Berg	4
(Indonesia) Muhammad Simanjuntak	9
(Philippines) Carlo Biado	9
(Japan) Hayato Hijikata	8

=== Group 13 ===
Main Round
(China) Wu Jia-qing	9
(Qatar) Ali al-Obaidly	3
(Peru) Manuel Chau	8
(South Korea) Ryu Seung-woo	9
(United States) Óscar Domínguez	9
(Poland) Mateusz Śniegocki	8
(Japan) Tōru Kuribayashi	2
(Estonia) Denis Grabe	9
1st playoff round
(Qatar) Ali al-Obaidly	9
(Peru) Manuel Chau	7
(Poland) Mateusz Śniegocki	9
(Japan) Tōru Kuribayashi	7

Winner’s Round
(China) Wu Jia-qing	9
(South Korea) Ryu Seung-woo	5
(United States) Óscar Domínguez	4
(Estonia) Denis Grabe	9
2nd playoff round
(Qatar) Ali al-Obaidly	6
(United States) Óscar Domínguez	9
(Poland) Mateusz Śniegocki	9
(South Korea) Ryu Seung-woo	5

=== Group 14 ===
Main Round
(China) Li Hewen	9
(Lebanon) Mohammed Berjaui	4
(Netherlands) Marco Teutscher	7
(Qatar) Francisco Felicilda	9
(Chinese Taipei) Lo Li-wen	9
(Argentina) Ariel Casto	3
(Japan) Yukio Akakariyama	9
(United States) Shane Van Boening	5
1st playoff round
(Lebanon) Mohammed Berjaui	1
(Netherlands) Marco Teutscher	9
(Argentina) Ariel Casto	2
(United States) Shane Van Boening	9

Winner’s Round
(China) Li Hewen	9
(Qatar) Francisco Felicilda	4
(Chinese Taipei) Lo Li-wen	9
(Japan) Yukio Akakariyama	5
2nd playoff round
(Netherlands) Marco Teutscher	1
(Japan) Yukio Akakariyama	9
(United States) Shane Van Boening	9
(Qatar) Francisco Felicilda	3

=== Group 15 ===
Main Round
(Philippines) Lee Vann Corteza	9
(United Arab Emirates) Salah al-Remawi	5
(Saudi Arabia) Abdulla al-Shemmari	9
(United States) Hunter Lombardo	4
(Philippines) Rogelio Belleca Sotero	9
(Vietnam) Do Hoang Quan	6
(Russia) Konstantin Stepanov	9
(Chinese Taipei) Chang Yu-Lung	8
1st playoff round
(United Arab Emirates) Salah al-Remawi	9
(United States) Hunter Lombardo	6
(Vietnam) Do Hoang Quan	2
(Chinese Taipei) Chang Yu-Lung	9

Winner’s Round
(Philippines) Lee Vann Corteza	9
(Saudi Arabia) Abdulla al-Shemmari	7
(Philippines) Rogelio Belleca Sotero	6
(Russia) Konstantin Stepanov	9
2nd playoff round
(United Arab Emirates) Salah al-Remawi	9
(Philippines) Rogelio Belleca Sotero	5
(Chinese Taipei) Chang Yu-Lung	9
(Saudi Arabia) Abdulla al-Shemmari	3

=== Group 16 ===
Main Round
(Qatar) Bashar Hussain	9
(Algeria) Abder Rehman Mebarki	6
(China) Dang Jinhu	9
(Germany) Joshua Filler	8
(China) Han Haoxiang	9
(Jordan) Ahmed M. Salah	8
(India) Himanshu Dinesh Jain	3
(Chinese Taipei) Cheng Yu-hsuan	9
1st playoff round
(Algeria) Abder Rehman Mebarki	0
(Germany) Joshua Filler	9
(Jordan) Ahmed M. Salah	9
(India) Himanshu Dinesh Jain	6

Winner’s Round
(Qatar) Bashar Hussain	3
(China) Dang Jinhu	9
(China) Han Haoxiang	9
(Chinese Taipei) Cheng Yu-hsuan	3
2nd playoff round
(Germany) Joshua Filler	3
(Chinese Taipei) Cheng Yu-hsuan	9
(Jordan) Ahmed M. Salah	9
(Qatar) Bashar Hussain	5

== Knockout phase ==
Round of 64
(Chinese Taipei) Ko Pin-yi	5
(Scotland) Jayson Shaw	11
(Germany) Thorsten Hohmann	8
(Philippines) Dennis Orcollo	11
(Chinese Taipei) Chang Jung-lin	11
(Japan) Satoshi Kawabata	7
(Philippines) Johann Chua	9
(Ukraine) Artem Koshovyi	11
(Chinese Taipei) Chu Hong-ming	3
(Germany) Ralf Souquet	11
(Russia) Ruslan Tschinachow	9
(Austria) Mario He	11
(Spain) Francisco Sánchez	11
(Eritrea) Hamzaa Saeed Ali	8
(Austria) Albin Ouschan	11
(Philippines) Jeffrey Ignacio	7
(China) Zhou Long	11
(Chinese Taipei) Chang Yu-Lung	7
(Canada) Alex Pagulayan	11
(Indonesia) Irsal Nasution	8
(England) Karl Boyes	7
(Indonesia) Muhammad Simanjuntak	11
(Singapore) Toh Lian Han	11
(Bangladesh) MD Almin	6
(Philippines) Ramil Gallego	5
(Philippines) Carlo Biado	11
(Spain) David Alcaide	9
(South Korea) Jeong Young-hwa	11
(Greece) Nikos Ekonomopoulos	11
(Philippines) Jeff de Luna	7
(Chinese Taipei) Ko Ping-chung	11
(Poland) Wojciech Szewczyk	9
(China) Liu Haitao	11
(Japan) Yukio Akakariyama	4
(Greece) Alexander Kazakis	11
(United States) Óscar Domínguez	4
(China) Chu Bingjie	11
(Jordan) Ahmed M. Salah	3
(Chinese Taipei) Hsieh Chia-chen	7
(Poland) Karol Skowerski	11
(Philippines) Warren Kiamco	7
(United States) Shane Van Boening	11
(Chinese Taipei) Wu Kun-lin	11
(Saudi Arabia) Abdul Rahman al-Amar	10
(Spain) Francisco Díaz-Pizarro	9
(Kuwait) Omar Al-Shaheen	11
(Czech Republic) Roman Hybler	5
(United Arab Emirates) Salah al-Remawi	11
(China) Wu Jia-qing	11
(Netherlands) Niels Feijen	9
(Estonia) Denis Grabe	11
(Poland) Mieszko Fortuński	3
(China) Li Hewen	7
(England) Daryl Peach	11
(Chinese Taipei) Lo Li-wen	11
(Chinese Taipei) Yang Ching-shun	10
(Philippines) Lee Vann Corteza	10
(Chinese Taipei) Cheng Yu-hsuan	11
(Russia) Konstantin Stepanov	11
(Poland) Mateusz Śniegocki	8
(China) Dang Jinhu	11
(Philippines) Roberto Gomez	7
(China) Han Haoxiang	11
(Iran) Ali Maghsoud	7

Round of 32
(Scotland) Jayson Shaw	11
(Philippines) Dennis Orcollo	6
(Chinese Taipei) Chang Jung-lin	7
(Ukraine) Artem Koshovyi	11
(Germany) Ralf Souquet	10
(Austria) Mario He	11
(Spain) Francisco Sánchez	6
(Austria) Albin Ouschan	11
(China) Zhou Long	8
(Canada) Alex Pagulayan	11
(Indonesia) M. Simanjuntak	11
(Singapore) Toh Lian Han	10
(Philippines) Carlo Biado	11
(South Korea) Jeong Young-hwa	4
(Greece) Nikos Ekonomopoulos	6
(Chinese Taipei) Ko Ping-chung	11
(China) Liu Haitao	6
(Greece) Alexander Kazakis	11
(China) Chu Bingjie	11
(Poland) Karol Skowerski	3
(United States) Shane Van Boening	11
(Chinese Taipei) Wu Kun-lin	5
(Kuwait) Omar Al-Shaheen	11
(United Arab Emirates) Salah al-Remawi	4
(China) Wu Jia-qing	7
(Estonia) Denis Grabe	11
(England) Daryl Peach	11
(Chinese Taipei) Lo Li-wen	5
(Chinese Taipei) Cheng Yu-hsuan	11
(Russia) Konstantin Stepanov	8
(China) Dang Jinhu	11
(China) Han Haoxiang	7

Round of 16
(Scotland) Jayson Shaw	11
(Ukraine) Artem Koshovyi	10
(Austria) Mario He	9
(Austria) Albin Ouschan	11
(Canada) Alex Pagulayan	11
(Indonesia) M. Simanjuntak	7
(Philippines) Carlo Biado	9
(Chinese Taipei) Ko Ping-chung	11
(Greece) Alexander Kazakis	11
(China) Chu Bingjie	7
(United States) Shane Van Boening	11
(Kuwait) Omar Al-Shaheen	5
(Estonia) Denis Grabe	11
(England) Daryl Peach	6
(Chinese Taipei) Cheng Yu-hsuan	11
(China) Dang Jinhu	8

Quarter finals
(Scotland) Jayson Shaw	7
(Austria) Albin Ouschan	11
(Canada) Alex Pagulayan	11
(Chinese Taipei) Ko Ping-chung	10
(Greece) Alexander Kazakis	9
(United States) Shane Van Boening	11
(Estonia) Denis Grabe	3
(Chinese Taipei) Cheng Yu-hsuan	11

Semi-final
(Austria) Albin Ouschan	11
(Canada) Alex Pagulayan	4
(United States) Shane Van Boening	11
(Chinese Taipei) Cheng Yu-hsuan	9

Final
(Austria) Albin Ouschan	13
(United States) Shane Van Boening	6

=== Final ===
Player	Lag	Rack																			Racks won
Player	Lag	1	2	3	4	5	6	7	8	9	10	11	12	13	14	15	16	17	18	19	Racks won
(Austria) Albin Ouschan	•	1		1	1	1	1	1	1			1		1		1	1		1	1	13
(United States) Shane Van Boening			1							1	1		1		1			1			6
