= 2024 in precision sports =

This article lists the precision sports events for 2024.

== Air hockey ==
=== World Championships ===
- August 2–4: 2024 Air Hockey World Championships in (United States) Baytown

== Archery ==
- Full 2024 Archery Calendar here.

=== Olympic Games ===
- July 25 – August 4: 2024 Summer Olympics in (France) Paris

=== World & Continental Championships ===
- February 19–24: 2024 European Indoor Archery Championships in (Croatia) Varaždin
  - (gold) Italy; (silver) Ukraine; (bronze) Israel
- April 9–14: 2024 Pan American Archery Championships in Medellín
  - (gold) United States; (silver) Mexico; (bronze) Colombia
- May 7–12: 2024 European Archery Championships in (Germany) Essen
  - (gold) Italy; (silver) Ukraine; (bronze) Israel
- September 16–22: 2024 World Field Archery Championships in (Canada) Lac La Biche
- September 20 - October 6: 2024 World Archery 3D Championships in (Slovenia) Mokrice

=== 2024 Archery World Cup ===
- April 23 – 28: World Cup #1 in (China) Shanghai
  - Recurve winners: (Spain) Andrés Temiño (m) / (South Korea) Lim Si-hyeon (w)
  - Compound winners: (Austria) Nico Wiener (m) / (India) Jyothi Surekha Vennam (w)
- May 21 – 26: World Cup #2 in (South Korea) Yecheon
  - Recurve winners: (South Korea) Lee Woo-seok (m) / (South Korea) Lim Si-hyeon (w)
  - Compound winners: (United States) Sawyer Sullivan (m) / (Colombia) Sara López (w)
- June 18 – 23: World Cup #3 in (Turkey) Antalya
  - Recurve winners: (South Korea) Kim Woo-jin (m) / (China) Yang Xiaolei (w)
  - Compound winners: (Netherlands) Mike Schloesser (m) / (Italy) Elisa Roner (w)
- October 19 – 20: World Cup Final in (Mexico) Tlaxcala

=== 2023–24 Indoor Archery World Series ===
- October 27–29, 2023: World Series #1 in (Switzerland) Lausanne
  - Recurve winners: (Netherlands) Steve Wijler (m) / (Slovakia) Denisa Baránková (w)
  - Compound winners: (Netherlands) Mike Schloesser (m) / (Italy) Paola Natale (w)
  - Recurve under 21 winners: (Croatia) Matija Šmaguc (m) / (Netherlands) Quinty Roeffen (w)
  - Compound under 21 winners: (Italy) Lorenzo Gubbini (m) / (Luxembourg) Lea Tonus (w)
- November 17–19, 2023: World Series #2 in (Luxembourg) Strassen
  - Recurve winners: (Netherlands) Steve Wijler (m) / (Czech Republic) Marie Horáčková (w)
  - Compound winners: (United States) James Lutz (m) / (United States) Paige Pearce (w)
  - Recurve under 21 winners: (Turkey) Arda Ege Donmezguc (m) / (Netherlands) Quinty Roeffen (w)
  - Compound under 21 winners: (France) Victor Bouleau (m) / (Luxembourg) Lea Tonus (w)
- December 8–10, 2023: World Series #3 in (Chinese Taipei) Taoyuan City
  - Recurve winners: (Chinese Taipei) Tai Yu-Hsuan (m) / (Chinese Taipei) Lei Chien-Ying (w)
  - Compound winners: (India) Prathamesh Jawkar (m) / (India) Parneet Kaur (w)
  - Recurve under 21 winners: (Chinese Taipei) Chang Yi-chung (m) / (India) Bhajan Kaur (w)
  - Compound under 21 winners: (India) Sachin Chaudhary (m) / (Chinese Taipei) Hsiao Yu-Chieh (w)
- January 19–22: World Series #4 in (France) Nimes
  - Recurve winners: (Israel) Roy Dror (m) / (Spain) Elia Canales (w)
  - Compound winners: (Netherlands) Mike Schloesser (m) / (Colombia) Alejandra Usquiano (w)
  - Recurve under 21 winners: (Croatia) Leo Sulik (m) / (Netherlands) Quinty Roeffen (w)
  - Compound under 21 winners: (Denmark) Nicklas Bredal Bryld (m) / (France) Chloe Leroy (w)
- February 2–4: World Series #5 (final) in (United States) Las Vegas
  - Recurve winners: (United States) Brady Ellison (m) / (Germany) Michelle Kroppen (w)
  - Compound winners: (United States) James Lutz (m) / (Italy) Elisa Roner (w)

=== Other Ranking Events ===
- February 20 – 25: Asia Cup - Leg 1 in (Iraq) Baghdad
  - Recurve winners: (India) Dhiraj Bommadevara (m) / (India) Deepika Kumari (w)
  - Compound winners: (India) Prathamesh Jawkar (m) / (India) Parneet Kaur (w)
  - Recurve team winners: India (m) / India (w) / India (mixed)
  - Compound team winners: India (m) / Iran (w) / India (mixed)
- March 25 – 31: 2024 South American Championships in Maricá
  - Recurve winners: (Brazil) Marcus D'Almeida (m) / (Brazil) Ana Lucia Sliachticas (w)
  - Compound winners: (Brazil) Luccas Abreu (m) / (Peru) Beatriz Aliaga Hurtado (w)
  - Recurve team winners: Chile (m) / Colombia (w) / Brazil (mixed)
  - Compound team winners: Brazil (m) / Brazil (w) / Peru (mixed)
- April 3 – 7: Kahriman Bagatir Spring Arrows Tournament in (Turkey) Antalya
  - Recurve winners: (Turkey) Mete Gazoz (m) / (Germany) Katharina Bauer (w)
  - Compound winners: (Turkey) Yağız Sezgin (m) / (Turkey) Hazal Burun (w)
  - Recurve team winners: Italy (m) / Germany (w) / Italy (mixed)
- May 4–7: European Olympic Qualification Tournament in (Germany) Essen
  - Recurve winners: (Netherlands) Steve Wijler (m) / (Austria) Elisabeth Straka (w)
- May 27–29: Conquest Cup in (Turkey) Istanbul
- May 30 – June 2: Veronica's Cup World Ranking Event in Kamnik
  - Recurve winners: (France) Romain Fichet (m) / (Italy) Chiara Rebagliati (w)
  - Compound winners: (Israel) Shamai Yamrom (m) / (Croatia) Amanda Mlinarić (w)
  - Recurve team winners: United Kingdom (m) / Ukraine (w) / United Kingdom (mixed)
  - Compound team winners: Slovenia (m) / Slovakia (mixed)
- June 3–8: Poreč European Grand Prix in (Croatia) Poreč
- June 3–8: Asia Cup - Leg 3 in (South Korea) Suwon
- June 14 – 17: Final World Olympic Qualification Tournament in (Turkey) Antalya

== Axe throwing ==
=== World Championships ===
- April 18–21: 2024 World Axe and Knife Throwing Championships in (United States) Tulsa

== Boules sports ==
=== World Championships ===
- December 5–8: 2024 Petanque Men's Triplettes & Precision Shooting World Championships in (France) Dijon
- October 30 – November 3: 2024 World Seniors Bocce Championship in (Turkey) Mersin

=== Other tournaments ===
==== Confederazione Boccistica Internazionale ====
- May 15–21: African Seniors Bocce Championship in (Algeria) Touggourt
- May 28–30: Hong Kong International Raffa Doubles in Hong Kong
- June 17–23: European Seniors Bocce Championship in (Italy) Terni
- August 26 – September 1: European Juniors Bocce Championship in (Austria) Innsbruck
- October 23–27: 15th International Kemer Open Tournament (Turkey) Kemer
- November 1: 8th GP Pannocchia d'oro in (Italy) Terni

==== Confédération Européenne de Pétanque ====
- June 19–23: 4th EC Individuals: Men and Women & 2nd EC Doubles: Men, Women and Mixed in (Switzerland) Martigny
- July 11–14: 11th Triples/Precision Shooting: Women in (Spain) Santa Susanna
- October 3–6: 12th Triples/Precision Shooting: Espoirs (M/F) & 13th Triples/Precision Shooting: Juniors (M/F) in (Spain) Isla Cristina
- November 7–10: 26th European Cup in (France) Sin-le-Noble

==== Asian Boules Sport Confederation ====
- May 28–30: 2nd Hong Kong International Petanque Open Doubles 2024 in Hong Kong
- June 29–30: Pan Pacific Petanque Cup 2024 in (Chinese Taipei) Taipei City

== Bowling ==
=== Ten-pin bowling ===
==== 2024 PBA Tour ====
Major events

- January 10–15: 2024 PBA Players Championship in (United States) Wichita
  - Winner: (United States) Bill O'Neill
- January 29 – February 2: 2024 U.S. Open in (United States) Indianapolis
  - Winner: (United States) Kyle Troup
- March 25–31: 2024 USBC Masters in (United States) Las Vegas
  - Winner: (United States) DeeRonn Booker
- April 8–21: 2024 PBA World Championship in (United States) Allen Park
  - Winner: (United States) E. J. Tackett
- April 23–28: 2024 PBA Tournament of Champions in (United States) Fairlawn
  - Winner: (United States) Marshall Kent

=== Nine-pin bowling ===
- Calendar here

==== Classic ====
World Championships

- May 21–26: 2024 World U23 Ninepin Bowling Classic Championships in (Slovakia) Brezno
- May 26 – June 1: 2024 World Singles Ninepin Bowling Classic Championships in (Slovakia) Brezno

Continental Championships

- May 16–21: 2024 Ninepin Bowling Classic European Championship U14 in (Slovakia) Brezno
- May 16–21: 2024 Ninepin Bowling Classic European Championship U18 in (Slovakia) Brezno

Club Championships

- March 30–31: Champions League – Final tournament in (Serbia) Bačka Topola
  - Results here
- October 15–19: World Cup Club Teams in (Hungary) Budapest
- October 15–19: European Cup Club Teams in (Slovenia) Maribor
- October 15–19: NBC Cup Club Teams in (Serbia) Apatin

==== Schere ====
World Championships

- March 15–17: World Cup in (Germany) Langenfeld
  - Results here
- May 14–18: 2024 World Ninepin Bowling Schere Championships in (Germany) Herne
- May 19–20: Intern. Meisterschaften auf Dreibahnen in (Germany) Wolfsburg
- August 6–11: Intern. Meisterschaften Damen A und Herren A in (Netherlands) Eygelshoven

== Bowls ==
- World Bowls Calendar here.

=== World Bowls ===
- April 21–27: 2024 World Bowls Indoor Championships in Guernsey
  - Men's singles winner: (Guernsey) Jason Greenslade
  - Women's singles winner: (Malaysia) Nor Farah Ain Abdullah
  - Mixed pairs winners: (Australia) Ray Pearse & (Australia) Samantha Atkinson
- July 21–28: Lion City Cup in Singapore
- August 17–24: Canadian Lawn Bowling Championships in (Canada) Ontario
- September 9–13: Bowls USA National Championships in (United States) Milwaukee
- September 23–26: 2024 African States Tournament in (Botswana) Orapa
- November 3–9: 2024 US Open in (United States) Sun City Area
- November 20–24: Oceania Challenge in (New Zealand) Auckland
- November 25–30: Champion of Champions in (New Zealand) Auckland

=== World Bowls Tour ===
- January 5–21: 2024 World Indoor Bowls Championship in (England) Hopton-on-Sea
  - Men's singles winner: (Scotland) Stewart Anderson
  - Women's singles winner: (England) Katherine Rednall
  - Open U25 winner: (Scotland) Darren Weir
  - Open pairs winners: (Scotland) Stewart Anderson & (Scotland) Darren Burnett
  - Mixed pairs winners: (Wales) Ceri Ann Glen & (Scotland) Stewart Anderson
- November: 2024 Scottish International Open in (Scotland) Livingston

== Casting ==
- Casting Sport Calendar 2024 here.

=== World Championships ===
- July 10–14: 2024 Casting Sport World Championships Juniors U18 & cat.19-23 in (Sweden) Ulricehamn
- August 20–24: 2024 Fly Casting World Championships in (Sweden) Åhus
- September 4–8: 2024 Casting Sport World Championships in (Spain) Castellón

=== 2024 Casting Sport World Cup ===
- April 12–14: World Cup #1 in (Italy) Vicenza
- May 10–12: World Cup #2 in (Austria) Lenzing
- June 7–9: World Cup #3 in (Estonia) Tallinn
- July 5–7: World Cup #4 in (Slovakia) Nové Zámky
- September 20–22: World Cup Final in (Czech Republic) České Budějovice

== Cue sports ==
- 2024 UMB Calendar here.

=== Carom billiards ===
==== Major events ====
Date	Place	Event	Winner	Score	Runner-up	N
March 21–24	(Germany) Viersen	UMB World Three-cushion Championship for National Teams	(Vietnam) Vietnam; Trần Quyết Chiến; Bao Phương Vinh	78–62	(Spain) Spain; Ruben Legazpi; Sergio Jimenez	
June 19–22	(Turkey) Ankara	UMB Artistic Billiards World Championship	(Turkey) Hacı Arap Yaman	178–150	(Turkey) Barış Çin	
July 25–28	(Poland) Kielce	WCBS Championship				
September 10–12	(France) Blois	UMB Women's World Three-cushion Championship	(Denmark) Charlotte Sørensen	30–29	(Netherlands) Therese Klompenhouwer	
September 13–15	(France) Blois	UMB World Junior Three-cushion Championship	(Turkey) Seymen Özbaş	35–28	(South Korea) Jo Yeong-yun	
September 25–29	(Vietnam) Bình Thuận	UMB World Three-cushion Championship	(South Korea) Cho Myung-woo	50-23	(Vietnam) Tran Thanh Luc	
October 1–6	(Italy) Turin	UMB World Five-pins Championship				
November 15–17	(Switzerland) Lausanne	Lausanne Billard Masters	Event cancelled			

==== Three-Cushion World Cup ====
Date	Place	Event	Winner	Score	Runner-up	N
February 26 – March 3	(Colombia) Bogotá	World Cup #1	(Vietnam) Trần Quyết Chiến	50–44	(Egypt) Sameh Sidhom	
May 20–26	(Vietnam) Ho Chi Minh City	World Cup #2	(Vietnam) Trần Đức Minh	50–46	(South Korea) Kim Jun-tae	
June 10–16	(Turkey) Ankara	World Cup #3	(South Korea) Heo Jung-han	50–31	(Vietnam) Bao Phương Vinh	
July 7–13	(Portugal) Porto	World Cup #4	(Netherlands) Dick Jaspers	50–35	(South Korea) Cho Myung-woo	
October 20–26	(Netherlands) Veghel	World Cup #5				
November 4–10	(South Korea) Seoul	World Cup #6				
November 24–30	(Egypt) Sharm El Sheikh	World Cup #7				

==== World 3-Cushion Grand Prix ====
Date	Place	Event	Winner	Score	Runner-up	N
August 12–25	(South Korea) TBD	Grand Prix #1				
December 8–21	(South Korea) TBD	Grand Prix #2				

=== Pool billiards ===
==== Ranking events ====
Date	Place	Event	Format	Winner	Score	Runner-up	N
January 10–12	(Chinese Taipei) Taipei	Universal Chinese Taipei Open	9-ball	(Philippines) Carlo Biado	13–7	(Philippines) Bernie Regaliaria	
January 15–17	(United States) Elizabeth	Derby City Classic	9-ball	(Germany) Joshua Filler	9–8	(Lithuania) Pijus Labutis	
January 21–25	(Indonesia) Jakarta	Indonesia International Open	10-ball	(Philippines) Jeffrey Ignacio	10–3	(Hong Kong) Robbie Capito	
February 7–11	(Colombia) Medellín	Medellin Open	9-ball	(Germany) Moritz Neuhausen	11–3	(Venezuela) Dario Guanipa	
February 15–17	(Estonia) Tallinn	EuroTour men - Dynamic Billard Tallinn Open	9-ball	(Poland) Daniel Macioł	9–7	(Germany) Felix Vogel	
February 21–24	(United States) Las Vegas	PBS Las Vegas Open	10-ball	(Philippines) Lee Vann Corteza	4–2, 4–3	(Philippines) Carlo Biado	
February 27 – March 2	(United States) Las Vegas	Predator WPA World 10-ball Men's Championship	10-ball	(Philippines) Carlo Biado	3–1	(Japan) Naoyuki Ōi	
March 14–17	(Poland) Kielce	Polish Dynamic Billard 10-Ball Open	10-ball	(Poland) Daniel Macioł	8–7	(Bosnia and Herzegovina) Sanjin Pehlivanović	
March 15–17	(United States) Malden	McDermott Classic	9-ball	(Poland) Wiktor Zieliński	13–8	(United States) Tyler Styer	
March 18–25	(United States) West Haven	Premier League Pool	9-ball	(United States) Shane Van Boening	7–4	(Chinese Taipei) Ko Pin-yi	
March 28–30	(Spain) Vigo	FSR91 Nineball Open	9-ball	(Spain) Francisco Sánchez Ruiz	13–5	(Spain) David Alcaide	
April 5–7	(Italy) Modena	Marina Pool Open	9-ball	(Austria) Albin Ouschan	11–10	(Bosnia and Herzegovina) Sanjin Pehlivanović	
April 11–14	(United States) Oaks	Diamond Open 9-Ball Professional Players Championship	9-ball	(United Kingdom) Jayson Shaw		(Lithuania) Pijus Labutis	
April 16–20	(Mexico) Culiacán	Mexico Open	9-ball	(Spain) Jonás Souto	11–9	(United States) Oscar Dominguez	
April 25–28	(Germany) Hildesheim	World Pool Masters	9-ball	(United States) Fedor Gorst			
May 1–5	(Scotland) Glasgow	Jacoby Scottish Open	9-ball	(Vietnam) Dương Quốc Hoàng	10–8	(United States) Oscar Dominguez	
May 6–16	Qatar	Qatar Open					
May 7–12	(England) Telford	UK Open Pool Championship	9-ball	(Hong Kong) Robbie Capito	13–10	(Poland) Mieszko Fortuński	
May 23–25	(Austria) St.Johann/Pg.	EuroTour men - Dynamic Billard St. Johann I.P. Open	9-ball	(Syria) Mohammad Soufi	9–6	(Germany) Tobias Bongers	
June 3–8	(Saudi Arabia) Jeddah	World Pool Championship	9-ball	(United States) Fedor Gorst	15–14	(Albania) Eklent Kaçi	
June 12–15	(United Arab Emirates) Dubai	Knight Shot Dubai Open	9-ball	(Germany) Joshua Filler	13–11	(Albania) Eklent Kaçi	
July 18–20	(Slovenia) Podčetrtek	Euro Tour men - Dynamic Billard Podcertrek Open	10-ball	(Netherlands) Yannick Pongers	8–6	(Austria) Mario He	
August 22–24	(Italy) Treviso	EuroTour men - Dynamic Billard Treviso Open	10-ball	(Poland) Mateusz Śniegocki	8–5	(Germany) Felix Vogel	
September 2–8	New Zealand	Yalin WPA Men's World 8-Ball Championship 2024	8-ball	(Germany) Joshua Filler	10–8	(Chinese Taipei) Hsu Jui-an	
September 2–8	New Zealand	Massé WPA Women's World 9-Ball Championship	9-ball	(Philippines) Rubilen Amit	3–1	(China) Chen Siming	
September 2–8	New Zealand	World Junior Championship	9-ball				
September 14–22	China	WPA 9-Ball China Open	9-ball				
September 24–28	(United States) Roanoke	Battle of the Bull					
October 1–4	(Vietnam) Da Nang	Peri 9-ball Open					
October 8–13	(Vietnam) Hanoi	Hanoi Open Pool Championship					
October 15–18	(Philippines) Manila	Reyes Cup					
October 14–20	Venezuela	Men World 8-Ball Champs					
October 14–20	Venezuela	WPA Women World 10-Ball Champs					
October 26 – November 2	(United States) Norfolk	The INT’L Open					
November 5–10	(United States) Raleigh	The Beasley Open					
November 7–10	(Morocco) Tangier	Morocco Open					
November 8–10	(Netherlands) Lelystad	The Orangeforks Open					
November 14–16	(Turkey) Antalya	EuroTour men - Dynamic Billard Antalya Open	10-ball				
November 18–22	(United States) St. Augustine	International Open					
November 18–25	Puerto Rico	Puerto Rico Open					
December 10–15	(United States) Jefferson	Buffalo 3 Pro Classic					
December 10–15	(China) Shanghai	The 2nd Zen & Yuan8 Open					
December 11–15	(Portugal) Lourinhã	Meucci Portugal Open JG					
