= List of Euro Tour tournaments =

The following is a list of all tournaments held as a part of the pool Euro Tour since its inception in 1992.

== Tournament history ==
| No | Year | Venue | Competition | Winner | Runner-up | Semi-finalist | Discipline |
|---|---|---|---|---|---|---|---|
| 1 | 1992 | (Belgium) Waregem | Belgium Open | (Finland) Mika Immonen | (Sweden) Tom Storm | (Germany) Andreas Vondenhoff (Sweden) Urban Karlsson | 9-Ball |
| 2 | 1992 | (Netherlands) Loohorst | Dutch Open | (Germany) Thomas Engert | (Belgium) Mario Lannoye | (Finland) Mika Immonen (Germany) Andreas Vondenhoff | 9-Ball |
| 3 | 1992 | (Hungary) Pécs | Hungarian Open | (Germany) Thomas Engert | (Germany) Peter Haidinger | (Germany) Thomas Schröder (Austria) Rene Mautner | 9-Ball |
| 4 | 1992 | (Monaco) Monte Carlo | French Open | (Germany) Ralf Souquet | (Germany) Thomas Schröder | (Finland) Mika Immonen (Austria) Rene Mautner | 9-Ball |
| 5 | 1992 | (Italy) Campione d'Italia | Italian Open | (Germany) Bernd Jahnke | (Germany) Ralf Souquet | (Germany) Peter Haidinger (Germany) Andreas Vondenhoff | 9-Ball |
| 6 | 1992 | (Monaco) Monte Carlo | French Open | (Germany) Herbert Friedemann | (Finland) Mika Immonen | (Germany) Peter Haidinger (Germany) Ralf Souquet | 9-Ball |
| 7 | 1993 | (Germany) Bergheim | German Open | (Germany) Ralf Souquet | (Germany) Oliver Ortmann | (Germany) Günter Geisen (Sweden) Bengt Pedersen | 9-Ball |
| 8 | 1993 | (Austria) Salzburg | Austrian Open | (Germany) Oliver Ortmann | (Germany) Herbert Friedemann | (Germany) Christian Reimering (Finland) Mika Immonen | 9-Ball |
| 9 | 1993 | (Sweden) Malmö | Swedish Open | (Sweden) Bengt Pedersen | (Sweden) Bengt Jonasson | (Sweden) Tom Storm (Germany) Bernd Jahnke | 9-Ball |
| 10 | 1993 | (Hungary) Budapest | Hungarian Open | (Germany) Oliver Ortmann | (Germany) Bernd Jahnke | (Sweden) Bengt Jonasson (Germany) Herbert Friedemann | 9-Ball |
| 11 | 1993 | (Italy) Venedig | Italian Open | (Germany) Ralf Souquet | (Sweden) Bengt Pedersen | (Germany) Günter Geisen (Germany) Oliver Ortmann | 9-Ball |
| 12 | 1994 | (Switzerland) Zürich | Austrian Open | (Germany) Ralf Souquet | (Germany) Oliver Ortmann | (Sweden) Bengt Jonasson (Germany) Martin Poguntke | 9-Ball |
| 13 | 1994 | (France) Paris | French Open | (Germany) Oliver Ortmann | (Germany) Ralf Souquet | (Germany) Herbert Friedemann (Germany) Thomas Hasch | 9-Ball |
| 14 | 1994 | (Greece) Athens | Greek Open | (Germany) Oliver Ortmann | (Germany) Thomas Engert | (Norway) Raymond Hauge (Germany) Andreas Vondenhoff | 9-Ball |
| 15 | 1994 | (Sweden) Stockholm | Swedish Open | (Germany) Oliver Ortmann | (Germany) Thomas Engert | (Germany) Herbert Friedemann (Germany) Christian Reimering | 9-Ball |
| 16 | 1994 | (Netherlands) Rotterdam | Dutch Open | (Germany) Oliver Ortmann | (Germany) Ralf Souquet | (Netherlands) Rico Diks (United Kingdom) Lee Tucker | 9-Ball |
| 17 | 1994 | (Denmark) Aarhus | Danish Open | (Sweden) Tom Storm | (Germany) Ralf Souquet | (Norway) Raymond Hauge (Germany) Christian Reimering | 9-Ball |
| 18 | 1994 | (Switzerland) Zürich | Swiss Open | (Germany) Oliver Ortmann | (Germany) Ralf Souquet | (Norway) Raymond Hauge (Sweden) Bengt Pedersen | 9-Ball |
| 19 | 1994 | (Germany) Königswinter | German Open | (Germany) Thomas Engert | (Germany) Oliver Ortmann | (Sweden) Thomas Mehtala (Germany) Ralf Souquet | 9-Ball |
| 20 | 1994 | (Hungary) Budapest | Hungarian Open | (Germany) Thomas Hasch | (Finland) Mika Immonen | (Sweden) Thomas Mehtala (Germany) Ralf Souquet | 9-Ball |
| 21 | 1995 | (France) Metz | French Open | (Sweden) Tom Storm | (Germany) Ralf Souquet | (Germany) Thomas Engert (Germany) Günter Geisen | 9-Ball |
| 22 | 1995 | (Germany) München | German Open | (Finland) Mika Immonen | (Germany) Ralf Souquet | (Germany) Oliver Ortmann (Sweden) Tom Storm | 9-Ball |
| 23 | 1995 | (Czech Republic) Prague | Czech Open | (Germany) Oliver Ortmann | (Germany) Thomas Engert | (Germany) Ralf Souquet (Sweden) Tom Storm | 9-Ball |
| 24 | 1995 | (Finland) Helsinki | Finnish Open | (Finland) Mika Immonen | (Turkey) Aygun Karabiyik | (Norway) Raymond Hauge (Germany) Ralf Souquet | 9-Ball |
| 25 | 1996 | (Germany) Fürth | German Open | (Germany) Ralf Souquet | (Sweden) Bengt Pedersen | (Germany) Thomas Engert (Germany) Christian Reimering | 9-Ball |
| 26 | 1996 | (Italy) Salsomaggiore | Italian Open | (Switzerland) Samuel Clemann | (Germany) Thomas Engert | (Sweden) Urban Karlsson (Serbia and Montenegro) Šandor Tot | 9-Ball |
| 27 | 1996 | (Czech Republic) Prague | Czech Open | (Germany) Oliver Ortmann | (Finland) Mika Immonen | (Germany) Herbert Friedemann (Germany) Christian Reimering | 9-Ball |
| 28 | 1996 | (Sweden) Norrtälje | Sweden Open | (Germany) Oliver Ortmann | (Germany) Thomas Engert | (Germany) Christian Reimering (Germany) Ralf Souquet | 9-Ball |
| 29 | 1996 | (Netherlands) Maastricht | Dutch Open | (Germany) Thomas Engert | (Germany) Ralf Souquet | (Germany) Oliver Ortmann (Finland) Mika Immonen | 9-Ball |
| 30 | 1996 | (Germany) Regensburg | German Open | (Sweden) Tom Storm | (Germany) Ralf Souquet | (Germany) Thomas Engert (Sweden) Urban Karlsson | 9-Ball |
| 31 | 1997 | (Spain) Valencia | Spanish Open | (Germany) Thomas Engert | (Germany) Oliver Ortmann | (Germany) Bernd Jahnke (Germany) Gunter Geisen | 8-Ball |
| 32 | 1998 | (Spain) Vitoria-Gasteiz | Spanish Open | (Russia) Evgeny Stalev | (Switzerland) Samuel Clemann | (Spain) David Alcaide (Germany) Bernd Jahnke | 9-Ball |
| 33 | 1998 | (Germany) Rosenheim | German Open | (Philippines) Francisco Bustamante | (Netherlands) Rico Diks | (Germany) Thomas Engert (Netherlands) Alex Lely | 9-Ball |
| 34 | 1998 | (Poland) Toruń | Polish Open | (Germany) Thomas Engert | (Denmark) Peter Nielsen | (Switzerland) Samuel Clemann (Germany) Oliver Ortmann | 9-Ball |
| 35 | 1998 | (Spain) Barcelona | Spanish Open | (Mexico) Ismael Páez | (Germany) Bernd Jahnke | (Germany) Thomas Engert (Netherlands) Alex Lely | 9-Ball |
| 36 | 1998 | (Netherlands) Hoensbroek | Dutch Open | (Germany) Oliver Ortmann | (Sweden) Tom Storm | (Denmark) Peter Nielsen (Germany) Andreas Roschkowsky | 9-Ball |
| 37 | 1999 | (Portugal) Lisbon | Portraguise Open | (Germany) Ralf Souquet | (Germany) Dieter Johns | (Switzerland) Gianni Campagnolo (Mexico) Rafael Martinez | 9-Ball |
| 38 | 1999 | (Turkey) Antalya | Turkish Open | (Germany) Ralph Eckert | (Germany) Christian Reimering | (Germany) Dieter Johns (Netherlands) Alex Lely | 9-Ball |
| 39 | 1999 | (Germany) Neuwied | German Open | (Netherlands) Alex Lely | (Philippines) Francisco Bustamante | (Germany) Harald Stolka (Denmark) Kasper Thygesen | 9-Ball |
| 40 | 1999 | (Russia) St. Petersburg | Russian Open | (Germany) Ralf Souquet | (Switzerland) Samuel Clemann | (Germany) Michael Schmidt (Germany) Andreas Vondenhoff | 9-Ball |
| 41 | 1999 | (Germany) Krefeld | German Open | (Germany) Ralf Souquet | (Finland) Mika Immonen | (Germany) Peter Busarac (Germany) Thomas Engert | 9-Ball |
| 42 | 1999 | (Finland) Tampere | Finnish Open | (Sweden) Marcus Chamat | (Netherlands) Niels Feijen | (Russia) Evgeny Stalev (Sweden) Tom Storm | 9-Ball |
| 43 | 2000 | (Portugal) Lisbon | Portaguise Open | (United States) Johnny Archer | (Denmark) Peter Nielsen | (Germany) Oliver Ortmann (Germany) Ralf Souquet | 9-Ball |
| 44 | 2000 | (Italy) Rome | Italian Open | (United States) Johnny Archer | (Netherlands) Nick van den Berg | (Finland) Mika Immonen (Netherlands) Alex Lely | 9-Ball |
| 45 | 2000 | (Russia) Kaliningrad | Russian Open | (Switzerland) Dimitri Jungo | (Netherlands) Alex Lely | (Sweden) Tom Storm (Russia) Evgeny Stalev | 9-Ball |
| 46 | 2000 | (Germany) Neuwied | German Open | (Philippines) Francisco Bustamante | (Germany) Thomas Engert | (Finland) Mika Immonen (Sweden) Marcus Chamat | 9-Ball |
| 47 | 2000 | (Lithuania) Kaunas | Lithuanian Open | (Germany) Ralf Souquet | (Germany) Thomas Engert | (Sweden) Marcus Chamat (Netherlands) Alex Lely | 9-Ball |
| 48 | 2000 | (Finland) Tampere | Finnish Open | (Germany) Oliver Ortmann | (Netherlands) Niels Feijen | (Luxembourg) Marc Holtz (Sweden) Niklas Bergendorff | 9-Ball |
| 49 | 2001 | (Portugal) Porto | Portuguise Open | (Norway) Vegar Kristiansen | (Netherlands) Alex Lely | (Sweden) Marcus Chamat (Portugal) Henrique Correia | 9-Ball |
| 50 | 2001 | (Liechtenstein) Vaduz | Lichtenstein Open | (Germany) Ralf Souquet | (Germany) Christian Reimering | (Germany) Harald Stolka (Germany) Martin Poguntke | 9-Ball |
| 51 | 2001 | (England) Hull | English Open | (Italy) Fabio Petroni | (Netherlands) Rico Diks | (Poland) Radosław Babica (Denmark) Peter Nielsen | 9-Ball |
| 52 | 2001 | (Austria) Salzburg | Austrian Open | (Germany) Ralf Souquet | (Germany) Michael Schmidt | (Germany) Thomas Engert (Germany) Oliver Ortmann | 9-Ball |
| 53 | 2001 | (Finland) Tampere | Finnish Open | (Netherlands) Niels Feijen | (Germany) Christian Reimering | (Germany) Michael Schmidt (Finland) Aki Heiskanen | 9-Ball |
| 54 | 2002 | (Germany) Willingen | German Open | (Czech Republic) Roman Hybler | (Germany) Klaus Zobrekis | (Denmark) Kasper Thygesen (Germany) Andreas Roschkowsky | 9-Ball |
| 55 | 2002 | (Austria) Salzburg | Austrian Open | (Netherlands) Nick van den Berg | (Finland) Marko Lohtander | (Philippines) Francisco Bustamante (Germany) Oliver Ortmann | 9-Ball |
| 56 | 2002 | (Russia) St. Petersburg | Russian Open | (Germany) Ralf Souquet | (Netherlands) Niels Feijen | (Germany) Michael Schmidt (Sweden) Sten Jarledal | 9-Ball |
| 57 | 2002 | (Netherlands) Weert | Dutch Open | (Sweden) Niklas Bergendorff | (Sweden) Tom Storm | (Netherlands) Niels Feijen (France) Stephan Cohen | 9-Ball |
| 58 | 2002 | (Finland) Tampere | Finnish Open | (Sweden) Erik Weiselius | (Netherlands) Alex Lely | (Poland) Radosław Babica (Sweden) Tom Storm | 9-Ball |
| 59 | 2003 | (Belgium) Antwerp | Belgium Open | (Sweden) Tom Storm | (Germany) Oliver Ortmann | (Poland) Mariusz Roter (Netherlands) Rico Diks | 9-Ball |
| 60 | 2003 | (Austria) Rankweil | Austrian Open | (Sweden) Niklas Bergendorff | (Germany) Thorsten Hohmann | (Netherlands) Alex Lely (Finland) Marko Lohtander | 9-Ball |
| 61 | 2003 | (Netherlands) Weert | Dutch Open | (Germany) Thorsten Hohmann | (Netherlands) Nick van den Berg | (Germany) Michael Schmidt (Netherlands) Niels Feijen | 9-Ball |
| 62 | 2003 | (Germany) Neuwied | German Open | (Sweden) Tom Storm | (Germany) Thomas Engert | (Germany) Florian Hammer (Germany) Ralf Souquet | 9-Ball |
| 63 | 2003 | (Belgium) Kortrijk | Belgium Open | (Germany) Ralf Souquet | (Germany) Oliver Ortmann | (Sweden) Marcus Chamat (Germany) Thorsten Schober | 9-Ball |
| 64 | 2004 | (Italy) Monfalcone | Italian Open | (Germany) Thomas Engert | (Germany) Thorsten Hohmann | (Germany) Oliver Ortmann (Netherlands) Alex Lely | 9-Ball |
| 65 | 2004 | (Germany) Sindelfingen | German Open | (Germany) Oliver Ortmann | (United Kingdom) Daryl Peach | (Poland) Radosław Babica (Netherlands) Niels Feijen | 9-Ball |
| 66 | 2004 | (Austria) Rankweil | Austrian Open | (Sweden) Marcus Chamat | (Netherlands) Niels Feijen | (United Kingdom) Daryl Peach (Greece) John Vassalos | 9-Ball |
| 67 | 2004 | (Netherlands) Weert | Dutch Open | (Serbia) Šandor Tot | (Netherlands) Alex Lely | (Netherlands) Niels Feijen (Germany) Oliver Ortmann | 9-Ball |
| 68 | 2004 | (Denmark) Copenhagen | Danish Open | (Spain) Samir Kaddur | (Czech Republic) Roman Hybler | (Germany) Jakob Belka (Sweden) Marcus Chamat | 9-Ball |
| 69 | 2004 | (Spain) Málaga | Spanish Open | (Serbia) Šandor Tot | (Germany) Ralf Souquet | (Germany) Thorsten Hohmann (Netherlands) Rico Diks | 9-Ball |
| 70 | 2005 | (Belgium) Ghent | Belgium Open | (Netherlands) Niels Feijen | (Germany) Andreas Roschkowsky | (Norway) Roger Lysholm (United Kingdom) Imran Majid | 9-Ball |
| 71 | 2005 | (Italy) Monfalcone | Italian Open | (Netherlands) Alex Lely | (Serbia) Šandor Tot | (Netherlands) Niels Feijen (Czech Republic) Roman Hybler | 9-Ball |
| 72 | 2005 | (Germany) Sindelfingen | German Open | (Netherlands) Nick van den Berg | (Sweden) Marcus Chamat | (Hungary) Vilmos Földes (Germany) Jörn Kaplan | 9-Ball |
| 73 | 2005 | (Austria) Rankweil | Austrian Open | (Finland) Markus Juva | (Malta) Tony Drago | (United Kingdom) Daryl Peach (Netherlands) Niels Feijen | 9-Ball |
| 74 | 2005 | (Netherlands) Weert | Dutch Open | (Netherlands) Niels Feijen | (Sweden) Marcus Chamat | (Germany) Ralf Souquet (Poland) Radosław Babica | 9-Ball |
| 75 | 2005 | (Switzerland) Frauenfeld | Swiss Open | (Germany) Thomas Engert | (Germany) Andreas Roschkowsky | (United Kingdom) Imran Majid (Germany) Thorsten Hohmann | 9-Ball |
| 76 | 2005 | (Spain) Málaga | Spanish Open | (Germany) Christian Reimering | (Germany) Thomas Engert | (United Kingdom) Imran Majid (Germany) Andreas Roschkowsky | 9-Ball |
| 77 | 2006 | (Czech Republic) Prague | Czech Open | (Netherlands) Nick van den Berg | (United Kingdom) Darren Appleton | (Italy) Fabio Petroni (France) Stephan Cohen | 9-Ball |
| 78 | 2006 | (Italy) Monfalcone | Italian Open | (United Kingdom) Imran Majid | (Germany) Thomas Engert | (Netherlands) Niels Feijen (Germany) Sven Pauritsch | 9-Ball |
| 79 | 2006 | (Germany) Sindelfingen | German Open | (Germany) Harald Stolka | (Germany) Oliver Ortmann | (Netherlands) Niels Feijen (Hungary) Vilmos Földes | 9-Ball |
| 80 | 2006 | (Austria) Rankweil | Austrian Open | (Sweden) Marcus Chamat | (Netherlands) Nick van den Berg | (Germany) Thomas Engert (Netherlands) Niels Feijen | 9-Ball |
| 81 | 2006 | (Netherlands) Weert | Dutch Open | (Netherlands) Alex Lely | (Germany) Oliver Ortmann | (Spain) David Alcoberro (Germany) Thomas Engert | 9-Ball |
| 82 | 2006 | (Switzerland) Frauenfeld | Swiss Open | (United Kingdom) Jonni Fulcher | (Malta) Tony Drago | (Austria) Dejan Dabovic (Spain) Francisco Díaz-Pizarro | 9-Ball |
| 83 | 2006 | (Spain) Málaga | Spanish Open | (Italy) Fabio Petroni | (Netherlands) Niels Feijen | (Austria) Martin Kempter (Germany) Oliver Ortmann | 9-Ball |
| 84 | 2007 | (Czech Republic) Liberec | Czech Open | (Poland) Wojciech Trajdos | (Russia) Konstantin Stepanov | (Philippines) Marlon Manalo (Germany) Thomas Engert | 9-Ball |
| 85 | 2007 | (Italy) Castel Volturno | Italian Open | (Germany) Christian Reimering | (Russia) Konstantin Stepanov | (United Kingdom) Darren Appleton (Switzerland) Marco Tschudi | 9-Ball |
| 86 | 2007 | (Germany) Sindelfingen | German Open | (United Kingdom) Daryl Peach | (Switzerland) Dimitri Jungo | (Germany) Ralf Souquet (Spain) David Alcaide | 9-Ball |
| 87 | 2007 | (Austria) Rankweil | Austrian Open | (Greece) John Vassalos | (Malta) Tony Drago | (Finland) Markus Juva (Netherlands) Nick van den Berg | 9-Ball |
| 88 | 2007 | (Netherlands) Weert | Dutch Open | (United Kingdom) Imran Majid | (Czech Republic) Roman Hybler | (United Kingdom) Mark Gray (Russia) Ruslan Chinakhov | 9-Ball |
| 89 | 2007 | (Switzerland) Frauenfeld | Swiss Open | (United Kingdom) Mark Gray | (Hungary) Vilmos Földes | (Germany) Oliver Ortmann (Spain) David Alcaide | 9-Ball |
| 90 | 2007 | (Spain) Málaga | Spanish Open | (Italy) Bruno Muratore | (Poland) Radosław Babica | (Netherlands) Niels Feijen (United Kingdom) Mark Gray | 9-Ball |
| 91 | 2008 | (France) Paris | French Open | (Malta) Tony Drago | (Germany) Christian Reimering | (Switzerland) Marco Tschudi (Finland) Markus Juva | 9-Ball |
| 92 | 2008 | (Italy) Castel Volturno | Italian Open | (United Kingdom) Darren Appleton | (Italy) Bruno Muratore | (United Kingdom) Mark Gray (Austria) Martin Kempter | 9-Ball |
| 93 | 2008 | (Germany) Sindelfingen | German Open | (Germany) Thomas Engert | (Italy) Fabio Petroni | (Finland) Markus Juva (United Kingdom) Karl Boyes | 9-Ball |
| 94 | 2008 | (Austria) Rankweil | Austrian Open | (Netherlands) Nick van den Berg | (United Kingdom) Imran Majid | (Netherlands) Niels Feijen (Poland) Mateusz Śniegocki | 9-Ball |
| 95 | 2008 | (Netherlands) Weert | Dutch Open | (Germany) Ralf Souquet | (Turkey) Mehmet Cankurt | (Netherlands) Niels Feijen (Russia) Konstantin Stepanov | 9-Ball |
| 96 | 2008 | (Switzerland) Payerne | Swiss Open | (Germany) Ralf Souquet | (Germany) Christian Reimering | (Netherlands) Nick van den Berg (United Kingdom) Phil Burford | 9-Ball |
| 97 | 2008 | (Spain) Málaga | Spanish Open | (Netherlands) Niels Feijen | (Sweden) Marcus Chamat | (Serbia) Šandor Tot (Malta) Tony Drago | 9-Ball |
| 98 | 2009 | (France) Paris | French Open | (Netherlands) Niels Feijen | (Austria) Mario He | (Poland) Tomasz Kapłan (Germany) Ralf Souquet | 9-Ball |
| 99 | 2009 | (Italy) Castel Volturno | Italian Open | (Spain) David Alcaide | (Germany) Ralf Souquet | (Germany) Marko Vogel (United Kingdom) Craig Osborne | 9-Ball |
| 100 | 2009 | (Germany) Sindelfingen | German Open | (Germany) Ralf Souquet | (United Kingdom) Imran Majid | (Germany) Thomas Engert (Poland) Michał Czarnecki | 10-Ball |
| 101 | 2009 | (Austria) Rankweil | Austrian Open | (Sweden) Marcus Chamat | (United Kingdom) Darren Appleton | (Netherlands) Niels Feijen (Germany) Jakob Belka | 9-Ball |
| 102 | 2009 | (Netherlands) Weert | Dutch Open | (Germany) Oliver Ortmann | (United Kingdom) Imran Majid | (Poland) Mateusz Śniegocki (United Kingdom) Darren Appleton | 9-Ball |
| 103 | 2009 | (Portugal) Porto | Portuguise Open | (United Kingdom) Daryl Peach | (United Kingdom) Imran Majid | (Germany) Ralf Souquet (Czech Republic) Roman Hybler | 9-Ball |
| 104 | 2009 | (Spain) Benalmadena | Spanish Open | (United Kingdom) Mark Gray | (United Kingdom) Karl Boyes | (Poland) Mateusz Śniegocki (Spain) Francisco Díaz-Pizarro | 10-Ball |
| 105 | 2010 | (France) Paris | French Open | (Netherlands) Niels Feijen | (United Kingdom) Craig Osborne | (Malta) Tony Drago (Switzerland) Dimitri Jungo | 9-Ball |
| 106 | 2010 | (Italy) Treviso | Italian Open | (United Kingdom) Daryl Peach | (Poland) Mateusz Śniegocki | (France) Stephan Cohen (United Kingdom) Chris Melling | 9-Ball |
| 107 | 2010 | (Germany) Brandenburg | German Open | (Germany) Sacha Tege | (United Kingdom) Karl Boyes | (Italy) Fabio Petroni (United Kingdom) Raj Hundal | 10-Ball |
| 108 | 2010 | (Austria) St. Johann | Austrian Open | (United Kingdom) Karl Boyes | (Netherlands) Nick van den Berg | (United Kingdom) Chris Melling (Germany) Harald Stolka | 9-Ball |
| 109 | 2010 | (Finland) Vantaa | Finnish Open | (Netherlands) Nick van den Berg | (United Kingdom) Karl Boyes | (United Kingdom) Mark Gray (Austria) Mario He | 10-Ball |
| 110 | 2010 | (Portugal) Albufeira | Portuguise Open | (United Kingdom) Chris Melling | (Spain) Carlos Cabello | (Netherlands) Huidji See (Poland) Karol Skowerski | 9-Ball |
| 111 | 2010 | (Spain) Benalmádena | Spanish Open | (United Kingdom) Darren Appleton | (Spain) Francisco Díaz-Pizarro | (Germany) Christian Reimering (Germany) Sacha Tege | 10-Ball |
| 112 | 2011 | (France) Paris | French Open | (Germany) Ralf Souquet | (Netherlands) Nick van den Berg | (Netherlands) Niels Feijen (Norway) Kristoffer Mindrebøe | 9-Ball |
| 113 | 2011 | (Italy) Treviso | Italian Open | (Germany) Ralf Souquet | (United Kingdom) Jayson Shaw | (United Kingdom) Chris Melling (Netherlands) Niels Feijen | 9-Ball |
| 114 | 2011 | (Austria) St. Johann | Austrian Open | (United Kingdom) Richard Jones | (Belgium) Serge Das | (United Kingdom) Mark Gray (Poland) Mateusz Śniegocki | 9-Ball |
| 115 | 2011 | (Germany) Brandenburg | German Open | (Switzerland) Dimitri Jungo | (Belgium) Serge Das | (Germany) Manuel Ederer (United Kingdom) Karl Boyes | 10-Ball |
| 116 | 2011 | (Hungary) Eger | Hungarian Open | (Germany) Ralf Souquet | (Sweden) Marcus Chamat | (United Kingdom) Jayson Shaw (Germany) Markus Buck | 10-Ball |
| 117 | 2011 | (Italy) Treviso | Italian Open | (United Kingdom) Mark Gray | (Spain) David Alcaide | (Netherlands) Nick van den Berg (United Kingdom) Darren Appleton | 9-Ball |
| 118 | 2012 | (Bosnia and Herzegovina) Sarajevo | Bosnia & Herzegovina Open | (Austria) Albin Ouschan | (Switzerland) Dimitri Jungo | (United Kingdom) Chris Melling (Netherlands) Nick van den Berg | 9-Ball |
| 119 | 2012 | (Italy) Treviso | Italian Open | (Germany) Dominic Jentsch | (Spain) David Alcaide | (Netherlands) Nick van den Berg (United Kingdom) Phil Burford | 10-Ball |
| 120 | 2012 | (Austria) St. Johann | Austrian Open | (Greece) Nikos Ekonomopoulos | (Poland) Wojciech Szewczyk | (Germany) Nicolas Ottermann (Sweden) Marcus Chamat | 9-Ball |
| 121 | 2012 | (Germany) Brandenburg | German Open | (United Kingdom) Daryl Peach | (Netherlands) Niels Feijen | (Ukraine) Artem Koshovyi (Germany) Oliver Ortmann | 10-Ball |
| 122 | 2012 | (Cyprus) Kyrenia | North Cyprus Open | (Albania) Nick Malai | (Austria) Albin Ouschan | (Switzerland) Dimitri Jungo (Germany) Dominic Jentsch | 9-Ball |
| 123 | 2012 | (Italy) Treviso | Italian Open | (Netherlands) Nick van den Berg | (Italy) Fabio Petroni | (Spain) David Alcaide (Poland) Radosław Babica | 9-Ball |
| 124 | 2013 | (Italy) Treviso | Italian Open | (Russia) Konstantin Stepanov | (Switzerland) Dimitri Jungo | (Germany) Ralf Souquet (Austria) Albin Ouschan | 9-Ball |
| 125 | 2013 | (Austria) St. Johann | Austrian Open | (Netherlands) Niels Feijen | (Greece) Alexander Kazakis | (Spain) David Alcaide (Finland) Petri Makkonen | 9-Ball |
| 126 | 2013 | (Bosnia and Herzegovina) Sarajewo | Bosnia & Herzegovina Open | (Poland) Mateusz Śniegocki | (Poland) Tomasz Kapłan | (United Kingdom) Daryl Peach (France) Stephan Cohen | 10-Ball |
| 127 | 2013 | (Cyprus) Kyrenia | North Cyprus Open | (Russia) Konstantin Stepanov | (Italy) Daniele Corrieri | (Netherlands) Niels Feijen (Italy) Bruno Muratore | 9-Ball |
| 128 | 2013 | (Italy) Cison di Valmarino | Italian Open | (Germany) Ralf Souquet | (Italy) Daniele Corrieri | (United Kingdom) Imran Majid (Austria) Albin Ouschan | 9-Ball |
| 129 | 2013 | (Italy) Treviso | Italian Open | (Netherlands) Nick van den Berg | (United Kingdom) Phil Burford | (Spain) David Alcaide (Netherlands) Huidji See | 10-Ball |
| 130 | 2014 | (Italy) Treviso | Italian Open | (Netherlands) Nick van den Berg | (Poland) Karol Skowerski | (Netherlands) Niels Feijen (United Kingdom) Mark Gray | 9-Ball |
| 131 | 2014 | (Cyprus) Kyrenia | North Cyprus Open | (Germany) Ralf Souquet | (United Kingdom) Karl Boyes | (United Kingdom) Chris Melling (Poland) Mieszko Fortuński | 9-Ball |
| 132 | 2014 | (Austria) St. Johann | Austrian Open | (Estonia) Denis Grabe | (Greece) Nikos Ekonomopoulos | (Netherlands) Niels Feijen (Netherlands) Nick van den Berg | 9-Ball |
| 133 | 2014 | (Slovenia) Portorož | Slovenian Open | (Estonia) Denis Grabe | (Netherlands) Marc Bijsterbosch | (Sweden) Marcus Chamat (Norway) Mats Schjetne | 9-Ball |
| 134 | 2014 | (Netherlands) Leende | Dutch Open | (United Kingdom) Mark Gray | (Greece) Nikos Ekonomopoulos | (Greece) Alexander Kazakis (Austria) Mario He | 9-Ball |
| 135 | 2014 | (Italy) Treviso | Italian Open | (Netherlands) Nick van den Berg | (Netherlands) Niels Feijen | (Germany) Kevin Becker (Spain) Francisco Sánchez Ruiz | 9-Ball |
| 136 | 2015 | (Italy) Treviso | Italian Open | (Netherlands) Niels Feijen | (Greece) Nick Malai | (United Kingdom) Karl Boyes (Austria) Mario He | 9-Ball |
| 137 | 2015 | (Portugal) Vale do Lobo | Portuguise Open | (Poland) Mateusz Śniegocki | (Sweden) Marcus Chamat | (Spain) Francisco Sánchez Ruiz (Austria) Mario He | 9-Ball |
| 138 | 2015 | (Germany) Baunatal | German Open | (Finland) Petri Makkonen | (Poland) Konrad Juszczyszyn | (Germany) Florian Hammer (United Kingdom) Karl Boyes | 9-Ball |
| 139 | 2015 | (Austria) St. Johann | Austrian Open | (Netherlands) Niels Feijen | (Germany) Joshua Filler | (Spain) Francisco Díaz-Pizarro (Germany) Sebastian Ludwig | 9-Ball |
| 140 | 2015 | (Netherlands) Leende | Dutch Open | (Austria) Albin Ouschan | (United Kingdom) Imran Majid | (Germany) Sebastian Ludwig (United Kingdom) Jonni Fulcher | 9-Ball |
| 141 | 2015 | (Italy) Treviso | Italian Open | (United Kingdom) Mark Gray | (Greece) Alexander Kazakis | (Norway) Mats Schjetne (Germany) Oliver Ortmann | 9-Ball |
| 142 | 2016 | (Italy) Treviso | Italian Open | (Poland) Mieszko Fortuński | (Germany) Ralf Souquet | (United Kingdom) Jayson Shaw (Greece) Nikos Ekonomopoulos | 9-Ball |
| 143 | 2016 | (Austria) St. Johann | Austrian Open | (United Kingdom) Mark Gray | (Switzerland) Ronald Regli | (Germany) Joshua Filler (Netherlands) Marco Teutscher | 9-Ball |
| 144 | 2016 | (Cyprus) Kyrenia | North Cyprus Open | (Austria) Mario He | (Greece) Nikos Ekonomopoulos | (United Kingdom) Jayson Shaw (Finland) Mika Immonen | 9-Ball |
| 145 | 2016 | (Albania) Tirana | Albanian Open | (Poland) Mateusz Śniegocki | (Germany) Joshua Filler | (Poland) Wojciech Szewczyk (Russia) Ruslan Chinakhov | 9-Ball |
| 146 | 2016 | (Netherlands) Leende | Dutch Open | (Netherlands) Niels Feijen | (Spain) David Alcaide | (Poland) Wojciech Szewczyk (Spain) Francisco Sánchez Ruiz | 9-Ball |
| 147 | 2016 | (Italy) Treviso | Italian Open | (Spain) David Alcaide | (Germany) Joshua Filler | (Poland) Mieszko Fortuński (Netherlands) Niels Feijen | 9-Ball |
| 148 | 2017 | (Italy) Treviso | Italian Open | (Germany) Ralf Souquet | (Russia) Ruslan Chinakhov | (United Kingdom) Daryl Peach (Estonia) Denis Grabe | 9-Ball |
| 149 | 2017 | (Portugal) Albufeira | Portuguise Open | (Netherlands) Nick van den Berg | (Spain) David Alcaide | (United Kingdom) Mark Gray (Germany) Ralf Souquet | 9-Ball |
| 150 | 2017 | (Austria) St. Johann | Austrian Open | (Austria) Mario He | (Spain) Francisco Sánchez Ruiz | (Austria) Albin Ouschan (Germany) Joshua Filler | 9-Ball |
| 151 | 2017 | (Netherlands) Leende | Dutch Open | (Russia) Ruslan Chinakhov | (Germany) Christoph Reintjes | (Russia) Sergey Lutsker (Austria) Albin Ouschan | 9-Ball |
| 152 | 2017 | (Austria) Klagenfurt | Austrian Open | (Germany) Ralf Souquet | (Germany) Sebastian Ludwig | (Poland) Mateusz Śniegocki (Estonia) Denis Grabe | 9-Ball |
| 153 | 2017 | (Italy) Treviso | Italian Open | (Poland) Wiktor Zieliński | (Austria) Mario He | (Estonia) Denis Grabe (Albania) Eklent Kaçi | 9-Ball |
| 154 | 2018 | (Italy) Treviso | Italian Open | (Albania) Eklent Kaçi | (Austria) Albin Ouschan | (Spain) Francisco Díaz-Pizarro (United Kingdom) Imran Majid | 9-Ball |
| 155 | 2018 | (Austria) St. Johann | Austrian Open | (Greece) Alexander Kazakis | (Estonia) Denis Grabe | (Albania) Eklent Kaçi (Austria) Mario He | 9-Ball |
| 156 | 2018 | (Netherlands) Veldhoven | Dutch Open | (Austria) Mario He | (Albania) Eklent Kaçi | (Netherlands) Niels Feijen (Spain) David Alcaide | 9-Ball |
| 157 | 2018 | (Netherlands) Leende | Dutch Open | (United States) Shane Van Boening | (Albania) Eklent Kaçi | (Lithuania) Pijus Labutis (Austria) Albin Ouschan | 9-Ball |
| 158 | 2018 | (Austria) Klagenfurt | Austrian Open | (Austria) Mario He | (United Kingdom) Mark Gray | (Hungary) Olivér Szolnoki (Netherlands) Marc Bijsterbosch | 9-Ball |
| 159 | 2018 | (Italy) Treviso | Italian Open | (Russia) Fedor Gorst | (Poland) Mateusz Śniegocki | (Austria) Max Lechner (Poland) Tomasz Kapłan | 9-Ball |
| 160 | 2019 | (Netherlands) Leende | Dutch Open | (Germany) Joshua Filler | (Russia) Ruslan Chinakhov | (Germany) Ralf Souquet (Poland) Max Lechner | 9-Ball |
| 161 | 2019 | (Italy) Treviso | Italian Open | (Poland) Konrad Juszczyszyn | (Netherlands) Ivar Saris | (Lithuania) Pijus Labutis (Poland) Mateusz Śniegocki | 9-Ball |
| 162 | 2019 | (Netherlands) Veldhoven | Dutch Open | (Austria) Mario He | (Estonia) Denis Grabe | (Germany) Joshua Filler (Netherlands) Marc Bijsterbosch | 9-Ball |
| 163 | 2019 | (Austria) St. Johann | Austrian Open | (Albania) Eklent Kaçi | (Germany) Joshua Filler | (Germany) Ralf Souquet (Greece) Damianos Giallourakis | 9-Ball |
| 164 | 2019 | (Austria) Klagenfurt | Austrian Open | (Greece) Alexander Kazakis | (Netherlands) Marc Bijsterbosch | (Estonia) Denis Grabe (Norway) Mats Schjetne | 9-Ball |
| 165 | 2019 | (Turkey) Antalya | Turkish Open | (Estonia) Denis Grabe | (Albania) Eklent Kaçi | (Russia) Fedor Gorst (Spain) David Alcaide | 9-Ball |
| 166 | 2020 | (Italy) Treviso | Italian Open | (United Kingdom) Jayson Shaw | (Albania) Eklent Kaçi | (Russia) Fedor Gorst (Poland) Mateusz Śniegocki | 9-Ball |
| 167 | 2021 | (Austria) St. Johann | Austrian Open | (Germany) Joshua Filler | (Austria) Mario He | (Spain) David Alcaide (Spain) Francisco Sánchez Ruiz | 9-Ball |
| 168 | 2021 | (Slovenia) Lasko | Slovenian Open | (Spain) Francisco Sánchez Ruiz | (Greece) Alexander Kazakis | (Poland) Konrad Juszczyszyn (Syria) Mohammad Soufi | 9-Ball |
| 169 | 2021 | (Turkey) Antalya | Turkish Open | (Spain) Francisco Sánchez Ruiz | (Serbia) Aleksa Pecelj | (Netherlands) Marc Bijsterbosch (Poland) Mateusz Śniegocki | 9-Ball |
| 170 | 2021 | (Italy) Treviso | Italian Open | (Poland) Wiktor Zieliński | (Norway) Mats B. Schjetne | (Spain) David Alcaide (Spain) Francisco Sánchez Ruiz | 9-Ball |
| 171 | 2022 | (Slovenia) Lasko | Slovenian Open | (Poland) Wiktor Zieliński | (Germany) Joshua Filler | (Albania) Eklent Kaçi (Poland) Wojciech Szewczyk | 9-Ball |
| 172 | 2022 | (Italy) Treviso | Italian Open | (Germany) Joshua Filler | (Albania) Eklent Kaçi | (Poland) Wiktor Zieliński (Poland) Tomasz Kapłan | 9-Ball |
| 173 | 2022 | (Austria) St. Johann | Austrian Open | (Netherlands) Niels Feijen | (Spain) Francisco Sánchez Ruiz | (Hungary) Olivér Szolnoki (Switzerland) Dimitri Jungo | 9-Ball |
| 174 | 2022 | (Bulgaria) Petrich | Bulgarian Open | (Spain) Francisco Sánchez Ruiz | (Albania) Eklent Kaçi | (Austria) Mario He (Greece) Alexander Kazakis | 9-Ball |
| 175 | 2022 | (Slovenia) Lasko | Slovenian Open | (Germany) Joshua Filler | (Spain) Francisco Sánchez Ruiz | (Germany) Ralf Souquet (Austria) Mario He | 9-Ball |
| 176 | 2022 | (Italy) Treviso | Italian Open | (Austria) Mario He | (Albania) Eklent Kaçi | (Poland) Mieszko Fortuński (Poland) Wiktor Zieliński | 9-Ball |
| 177 | 2023 | (Estonia) Tallinn | Estonian Open | (Syria) Mohammad Soufi | (Spain) Francisco Sánchez Ruiz | (Netherlands) Niels Feijen (Greece) Alexander Kazakis | 9-Ball |
| 178 | 2023 | (Austria) St. Johann | Austrian Open | (Germany) Joshua Filler | (Poland) Daniel Macioł | (Poland) Wojciech Szewczyk (Germany) Juri Pisklov | 9-Ball |
| 179 | 2023 | (Finland) Tampere | Finish Open | (Poland) Mieszko Fortuński | (Netherlands) Marc Bijsterbosch | (Spain) Francisco Díaz-Pizarro (Portugal) João Grilo | 9-Ball |
| 180 | 2023 | (Slovenia) Podčetrtek | Slovenian Open | (Germany) Joshua Filler | (Poland) Konrad Juszczyszyn | (Bulgaria) Georgi Georgiev (Netherlands) Marc Bijsterbosch | 9-Ball |
| 181 | 2023 | (Slovenia) Lasko | Slovenian Open | (Germany) Joshua Filler | (Hungary) Olivér Szolnoki | (Netherlands) Quinten Pongers (Poland) Radosław Babica | 9-Ball |
| 182 | 2023 | (Italy) Treviso | Italian Open | (Germany) Joshua Filler | (Poland) Radosław Babica | (Poland) Daniel Macioł (Hungary) Olivér Szolnoki | 9-Ball |
| 183 | 2024 | (Estonia) Tallinn | Estonian Open | (Poland) Daniel Macioł | (Germany) Felix Vogel | (Spain) Jose Alberto Delgado (Poland) Radosław Babica | 9-Ball |
| 184 | 2024 | (Austria) St. Johann | Austrian Open | (Syria) Mohammad Soufi | (Germany) Tobias Bogers | (Germany) Marco Spitzyk (Poland) Mieszko Fortuński | 9-Ball |
| 185 | 2024 | (Slovenia) Podcetrtek | Slovinian Open | (Netherlands) Yannick Pongers | (Austria) Mario He | (Germany) Joshua Filler (Poland) Szymon Kural | 9-Ball |
| 186 | 2024 | (Italy) Treviso | Italian Open | (Poland) Mateusz Śniegocki | (Germany) Felix Vogel | (Spain) Juan Carlos Exposito (Hungary) Olivér Szolnoki | 10-Ball |
| 187 | 2024 | (Turkey) Antalya | Turkish Open | (Hungary) Olivér Szolnoki | (Poland) Daniel Macioł | (Poland) Radosław Babica (Poland) Mateusz Śniegocki | 10-Ball |
| 188 | 2025 | (Italy) Treviso | Italian Open | (Germany) Joshua Filler | (Germany) Stefan Kasper | (Poland) Wojciech Szewczyk (Netherlands) Niels Feijen | 10-Ball |
| 189 | 2025 | (Estonia) Tallinn | Estonian Open | (Germany) Joshua Filler | (Estonia) Denis Grabe | (Germany) Yuma Dörner (Germany) Stefan Kasper | 8-Ball |
| 190 | 2025 | (Austria) St. Johann | Austrian Open | (Poland) Mieszko Fortuński | (Poland) Wojciech Szewczyk | (Austria) Mario He (Germany) Stefan Kasper | 9-Ball |
| 191 | 2025 | (Slovenia) Podcetrtek | Slovenian Open | (Germany) Marco Spitzky | (Austria) Mario He | (Poland) Mieszko Fortuński (Slovenia) Maks Benko | 8-Ball |
| 192 | 2025 | (Netherlands) Assen | Dutch Open | (Germany) Tobias Bongers | (Poland) Dominik Jastrzab | (Poland) Mieszko Fortuński (Netherlands) Marc Bijsterbosch | 9-Ball |
| 193 | 2025 | (Spain) Gandia | Spanish Open | (Hungary) Olivér Szolnoki | (Germany) Luca Menn | (Poland) Hubert Lopotko (Germany) Felix Vogel | 10-Ball |
| 194 | 2026 | (Turkey) Antalya | Turkish Open | (Poland) Wojciech Szewczyk | (Poland) Radosław Babica | (Germany) Luca Menn (Poland) Mieszko Fortunski | 8-Ball |
| 195 | 2026 | (Luxembourg) Wickrange | Luxembourg Open | (Germany) Joshua Filler | (Poland) Wojciech Szewczyk | (Germany) Yuma Dorner (Poland) Wiktor Zielinski | 10-Ball |
| 196 | 2026 | (Austria) St. Johann | Austrian Open | (Austria) Albin Ouschan | (Germany) Joshua Filler | (Spain) David Alcaide (Hungary) Olivér Szolnoki | 9-Ball |
| 197 | 2026 | (Italy) Treviso | Italian Open | (Poland) Mateusz Sniegocki | (Germany) Juri Pisklov | (Estonia) Karl Gnadeberg (Germany) Stefan Kasper | 10-Ball |
| 198 | 2026 | (Spain) Gandia | Spanish Open | (Germany) Felix Vogel | (Germany) Luca Menn | (Netherlands) Mika Ven Berkel (Spain) Iker Andoni Echeverria | 9-Ball |
