= 2020 Treviso Open =

2020 nine-ball pool competition

2020 Dynamic Billiards Treviso Open
Tournament information
- Dates: 20–22 February 2020
- City: BHR Treviso Hotel, Treviso, Italy
- Discipline: Nine-ball

Final
- Champion: Jayson Shaw (SCO) (m); Jasmin Ouschan (AUT) (f)
- Runner-up: Eklent Kaçi (ALB); Aleksandra Guleikova (RUS) (f)
- Score: 9–8 (m); 7–1 (f)

The 2020 Treviso Open (sometimes known as the 2020 Dynamic Billard Italian Open) was a professional nine-ball pool event, the only Euro Tour tournament held in 2020. The event was played from 20 to 22 February 2020 at the BHR Treviso Hotel in Treviso, Italy. The event had a total prize pool of €38,000, with the winner of each event receiving €4,500.

The defending champion was Konrad Juszczyszyn, who had defeated Ivar Saris in the previous year's final, but was eliminated in the double-elimination round. The men's event was won by Jayson Shaw, who defeated Eklent Kaçi in the final 9–8. Kristina Tkach was the defending champion of the women's event, having defeated Marharyta Fefilava in the previous year's final. Tkach, however, lost in the quarter-finals to Aleksandra Guleikova. Jasmin Ouschan met Guleikova in the final, and won 7–1. Planned future Euro Tour tournaments in 2020 were cancelled due to the COVID-19 pandemic.

== Tournament format ==
The Treviso Open was the first and only Euro Tour event held in 2020, and was played from 20 to 22 February 2020 at the BHR Treviso Hotel in Treviso, Italy, and was played on 21 tables. A nine-ball pool event for both men and women were first played as a double-elimination tournament, with the men's event becoming a single-elimination bracket at the round-of-32, while the women's event remained a double-elimination tournament until the round-of-16. All men's matches were played as race-to-nine racks, whilst the women's matches were race-to-seven racks. The men's defending champion was Konrad Juszczyszyn, who had defeated Ivar Saris 9–6 in the 2019 Treviso Open final. Russia's Kristina Tkach was the defending champion of the women's event, having defeated Marharyta Fefilava 7–5 in the previous year's final. Due to the COVID-19 pandemic, planned future Euro Tour tournaments in 2020 were cancelled.

=== Prize fund ===
Both the men's and women's event's prize fund was similar to those of other Euro Tour events, totalling €38,000, of which €4,500 was awarded to the winner of each event.

Place	Prize money
Winner	€4,500
Finalist	€3,000
Semi-finalist	€1,750
Quarter-finalist	€1,250
Last 16	€1,000
Last 32	€600
33–48	€275
Total	€38,000

== Tournament summary ==
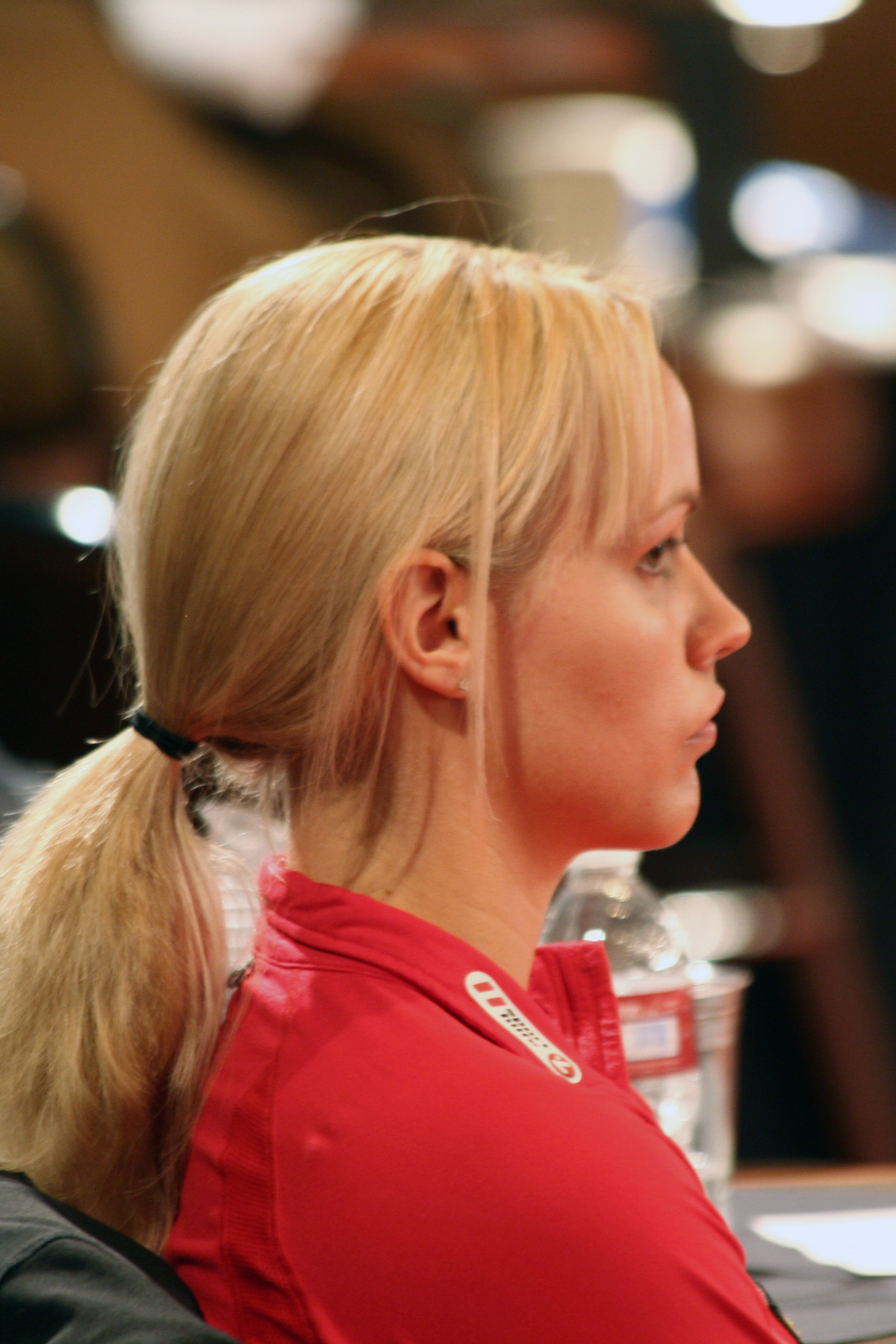
Austria's Jasmin Ouschan won the women's event.

There were 211 entrants into the men's event, which began with a double-elimination round. Having been defeated by Tobias Bongers, Chris Melling was eliminated from the competition after a 8–9 loss to Thorsten Hohmann. Former European Pool Championships winner Fabio Petroni lost in his opening round 6–9 to Wilhelm Georg, but qualified for the main stages. In the loser's qualification round, Ruslan Chinakhov and Mark Gray were both defeated, by Mieszko Fortuński and Sergei Luzker.

Two former world pool champions Joshua Filler and Fedor Gorst met in the round of 32, which went hill-hill, and Gorst ran the rack to win 9–8. Female player Marharyta Fefilava reached the last 32, defeating Quintin Pongers in the second loser's round to qualify. However, she lost 7–9 to Mickey Krause. Jayson Shaw defeated Albin Ouschan and Jani Uski 9–8, Tomasz Kapłan 9–4 before defeating Gorst 9–3 to reach the final. Eklent Kaçi defeated Luzker and Karol Skowerski 9–6 before completing a whitewash over Maximilian Lechner 9–0. Kaçi then beat Mateusz Śniegocki 9–6 to reach the final. The final, contested between Shaw and Kaçi, saw Kaçi lead 8–7. He played a safety shot on the 2-ball in rack 16, rather than play a pot, which Shaw described as the "wrong decision". Shaw won the rack, and then the decider to win his first Euro Tour event.

There were 48 entries into the women's event. Oliwia Zalewska, who had won the previous two Euro Tour event's completed two 7–6 victories over Lynn Pijpers and Valeriia Trushevskaia to qualify for the last 16. The highest ranked player, Kristina Tkach won over Elise Qiu and Monika Zabek. The second highest ranked player, Jasmin Ouschan won both her qualifying matches 7–2.

Defending champion Kristina Tkach completed a whitewash over Tina Vogelmann, but lost in the quarter-finals to Aleksandra Guleikova. Having defeated Bojana Sarac 7–5 in the last 16, Guleikova beat Ina Kaplan 7–3 to reach the final. Ouschan defeated Yini Gaspar, Kateryna Zlateva and Vania Franco to reach the final. Ouschan won the final 7–1 and commented that the event was "preparation" for events later in the year.

== Results ==
=== Men's competition ===
The results for the men's knockout round is shown below. Players in bold denote match winners.

1st Round
(Germany) Joshua Filler	8
(Russia) **Fedor Gorst**	**9**
(Germany) **Tobias Bongers**	**9**
(Netherlands) Pepijn de Wit	2
(Bosnia and Herzegovina) Sanjin Pehlivanović	8
(Czech Republic) **Roman Hybler**	**9**
(Germany) Ralf Souquet	3
(Spain) **Francisco Sánchez**	**9**
(Finland) Jere Virtaranta	2
(Finland) **Jani Uski**	**9**
(Austria) Albin Ouschan	8
(Scotland) **Jayson Shaw**	**9**
(Poland) Radosław Babica	5
(Poland) **Tomasz Kapłan**	**9**
(Spain) David Alcaide	8
(Finland) **Petri Makkonen**	**9**
(Albania) **Eklent Kaçi**	**9**
(Russia) Sergei Luzker	6
(Poland) **Karol Skowerski**	**9**
(Greece) Dimitris Loukatos	2
(Poland) Wojciech Szewczyk	1
(Poland) **Mieszko Fortuński**	**9**
(Austria) **Maximilian Lechner**	**9**
(Greece) Nick Malai	6
(Denmark) **Mickey Krause**	**9**
(Belarus) Marharyta Fefilava	7
(Austria) **Mario He**	**9**
(Italy) Fabio Petroni	7
(Netherlands) **Tim de Ruyter**	**9**
(Poland) Wiktor Zieliński	7
(Germany) Marco Dorenburg	5
(Poland) **Mateusz Śniegocki**	**9**

2nd Round
(Russia) **Fedor Gorst**	**9**
(Germany) Tobias Bongers	7
(Czech Republic) Roman Hybler	2
(Spain) **Francisco Sánchez**	**9**
(Finland) Jani Uski	8
(Scotland) **Jayson Shaw**	**9**
(Poland) **Tomasz Kapłan**	**9**
(Finland) Petri Makkonen	7
(Albania) **Eklent Kaçi**	**9**
(Poland) Karol Skowerski	6
(Poland) Mieszko Fortuński	8
(Austria) **Maximilian Lechner**	**9**
(Denmark) **Mickey Krause**	**9**
(Austria) Mario He	7
(Netherlands) Tim de Ruyter	7
(Poland) **Mateusz Śniegocki**	**9**

Quarterfinals
(Russia) **Fedor Gorst**	**9**
(Spain) Francisco Sánchez	5
(Scotland) **Jayson Shaw**	**9**
(Poland) Tomasz Kapłan	4
(Albania) **Eklent Kaçi**	**9**
(Austria) Maximilian Lechner	0
(Denmark) Mickey Krause	4
(Poland) **Mateusz Śniegocki**	**9**

Semifinals
(Russia) Fedor Gorst	3
(Scotland) **Jayson Shaw**	**9**
(Albania) **Eklent Kaçi**	**9**
(Poland) Mateusz Śniegocki	6

Finals
(Scotland) **Jayson Shaw**	**9**
(Albania) Eklent Kaçi	8

=== Women's competition ===
The following results are from the knockout stages following the round of 16. Players in bold denote match winners:

First round
**Kristina Tkach (RUS)**	**7**
Tina Vogelmann (GER)	0
Bojana Sarac (SER)	5
**Aleksandra Guleikova (RUS)**	**7**
**Ina Kaplan (GER)**	**7**
Monika Margeta (SWE)	4
Marharyta Fefilava (HUN)	**7**
**Eyllul Kibaroglu (TUR)**	0
Oliwia Zalewska (POL)	5
**Vania Franco (POR)**	**7**
**Dina Fatkhova (RUS)**	**7**
My Nguyen (POL)	5
Iza Lacka (UKR)	1
**Kristina Zlateva (POL)**	7
**Jasmin Ouschan (AUT)**	**7**
Yini Gaspar (SWI)	4

Quarter-finals
(Russia) Kristina Tkach	3
(Portugal) **Aleksandra Guleikova**	**7**
**(Germany) Ina Kaplan**	**7**
(Belarus) Marharyta Fefilava	4
**(Portugal) Vania Franco**	**7**
(Russia) Dina Fatykhova	4
(Hungary) Kateryna Zlateva	4
(Austria) **Jasmin Ouschan**	**7**

Semi-finals
(Russia) **Aleksandra Guleikova**	**7**
(Germany) Ina Kaplan	3
(Portugal) Vania Franco	1
(Austria) **Jasmin Ouschan**	**7**

Final
(Russia) Aleksandra Guleikova	1
(Austria) **Jasmin Ouschan**	**7**
