= 2002 WPA World Nine-ball Championship =

WPA World 9-Ball Championship 2002
Tournament information
- Sport: 9-ball
- Location: Cardiff, Wales
- Dates: July 18, 2002–July 24, 2002
- Tournament format: Round robin / Single Elimination
- Host(s): WPA World Nine-ball Championship, Matchroom Pool
- Participants: 128

Final positions
- Champion: (United States) Earl Strickland
- Runner-up: (Philippines) Francisco Bustamante

The 2002 WPA World Nine-ball Championship was the 13th edition of the WPA World Championship for 9-Ball Pool. It took place from July 18 to 24, 2002 in Cardiff, Wales.

The event was won by American Earl Strickland with a 17:15 victory in the final against Francisco Bustamante. Defending champion Mika Immonen was defeated in the round of 64 against Shannon Daulton.

== Format ==
The 128 participating players were divided into 16 groups, in which they competed in round robin mode against each other. The top four players in each group qualified for the final round played in the knockout system.

=== Prize money ===
The event's prize money stayed similar to that of the previous years, with winner Earl Strickland winning $65,000.

Position	Prize
First Place (champion)	$65,000
Second Place (runner-up)	$30,000
Third Place (semi-finalist	$17,500
Fifth place (quarter finalist)	$8,500
Ninth place (loser in round of 16)	$4,000
Seventeenth place (loser in round of 32)	$2,000
Thirty Third (loser in round of 64)	$1,500
Sixty Fifth place (Fifth or sixth in round robin group)	$1,000
Eighty First place (Seventh place in round robin group)	$500

== Preliminary round ==
The following 64 players dropped out in the group stage:

	5. Place	6. Place	7. Place	8. Place
Group 1:	(South Korea) Jeong Young-hwa	(Germany) Brian Naithani	(Wales) Wayne Lloyd	(Greece) George Sarmas
Group 2:	(New Zealand) Brent Wells	(Japan) Akikumo Toshikawa	(Switzerland) Sascha Specchia	(Netherlands) Gilliano Smit
Group 3:	(Indonesia) Robby Suarly	(Chinese Taipei) Chao Fong-Pang	(Wales) Lee Walker	(Spain) David López
Group 4:	(Japan) Haruyoshi Hinokiyama	(United States) Frankie Hernandez	(Netherlands) Robert Parlevliet	(Wales) Geoff Dunn
Group 5:	(Indonesia) Siauw Wieto	(Scotland) Pat Holtz	(India) Alok Kumar	(Aruba) Ryan Rampersaud
Group 6:	(Canada) Cliff Thorburn	(Sweden) Tom Storm	(England) Kevin Smith	(Italy) Carmine Nanula
Group 7:	(Australia) Shawn Budd	(England) Anthony Ginn	(Croatia) Marcos Castro	(Singapore) William Ang Boon Lay
Group 8:	(Singapore) Tiong Boon Tan	(Canada) Alain Martel	(England) Richard Jones	(Belgium) Gino Vermeesch
Group 9:	(Malta) Tony Drago	(Republic of Ireland) John Wims	(Switzerland) Dimitri Jungo	(Panama) Javier Palacios
Group 10:	(Republic of Ireland) Tommy Donlon	(Wales) Dominic Dale	(Norway) Ronny Oldervik	(Chinese Taipei) Chao Jung-hua
Group 11:	(Finland) Marko Lohtander	(Australia) Phil Reilly	(United States) George SanSouci	(Canada) Ed Galati
Group 12:	(Australia) Johl Younger	(Philippines) Leonardo Andam	(United States) Troy Frank	(Canada) Mario Morra
Group 13:	(Denmark) Kasper Thygesen	(England) Paul Hunter	(England) Darren Appleton	(Venezuela) Luis Miguel Sánchez
Group 14:	(Germany) Andreas Vondenhoff	(England) Andy Richardson	(Australia) Greg Jenkins	(Argentina) Jorge Llanos
Group 15:	(Wales) Rob McKenna	(Chinese Taipei) Kuo Yi-che	(Croatia) Ivica Putnik	(Aruba) Ditto Acosta
Group 16:	(Canada) Gerry Watson	(Indonesia) Mohammed Junarto	(United States) Shawn Putnam	(South Africa) David David Anderson

== Final round ==
Round of 64
(Germany) Oliver Ortmann	9
(England) Steve Knight	2
(United States) Tony Robles	9
(Czech Republic) Roman Hybler	1
(Philippines) Efren Reyes	9
(Poland) Radosław Babica	2
(Philippines) Dennis Orcollo	9
(Germany) Ralf Souquet	8
(Philippines) Francisco Bustamante	9
(England) Imran Majid	6
(Germany) Christian Reimering	9
(Spain) Victor Tapies	1
(Germany) Thomas Engert	9
(Chinese Taipei) Chen Wei-chih	2
(Philippines) Antonio Lining	9
(Netherlands) Nick van den Berg	4
(United States) Johnny Archer	9
(United States) Charlie Williams	3
(Netherlands) Rico Diks	9
(Russia) Evgeny Stalev	3
(France) Stephan Cohen	9
(Canada) Paul Potier	7
(Chinese Taipei) Lee Kun-fang	9
(England) Phil Harrison	8
(Italy) Fabio Petroni	9
(Netherlands) Niels Feijen	1
(Japan) Hiroshi Takenaka	9
(Spain) David Alcaide	6
(England) Steve Davis	9
(Philippines) Rodolfo Luat	8
(Chinese Taipei) Yang Ching-shun	9
(Germany) Michael Schmidt	5
(United States) Earl Strickland	9
(England) Gary Ponting	5
(South Korea) Park Shin-young	9
(Philippines) Warren Kiamco	6
(Germany) Thorsten Hohmann	9
(Japan) Shintaro Sugaya	0
(United States) Jeremy Jones	9
(Mexico) Ignacio Chávez	2
(Chinese Taipei) Huang Kun-chang	9
(Philippines) Lee Vann Corteza	8
(Netherlands) Alex Lely	9
(Wales) Mark Williams	1
(Mexico) Ernesto Domínguez	9
(Greece) Evangelos Vettas	6
(Japan) Kunihiko Takahashi	9
(Slovenia) Matjaž Erčulj	0
(Sweden) Marcus Chamat	9
(Sweden) Niklas Bergendorff	7
(United States) Corey Deuel	9
(United States) Kim Davenport	8
(United States) Nick Varner	9
(Socialist Federal Republic of Yugoslavia) Šandor Tot	6
(Philippines) Alex Pagulayan	9
(England) Daryl Peach	6
(Philippines) Ramil Gallego	9
(United States) Jim Rempe	3
(Japan) Takeshi Okumura	9
(Denmark) Peter Nielsen	4
(Chinese Taipei) Hung Lu-kung	9
(Chinese Taipei) Chung Chien-te	7
(United States) Shannon Daulton	9
(Finland) Mika Immonen	8

Round of 32
(Germany) Oliver Ortmann	9
(United States) Tony Robles	4
(Philippines) Efren Reyes	9
(Philippines) Dennis Orcollo	6
(Philippines) Francisco Bustamante	9
(Germany) Christian Reimering	2
(Germany) Thomas Engert	0
(Philippines) Antonio Lining	9
(United States) Johnny Archer	9
(Netherlands) Rico Diks	7
(France) Stephan Cohen	3
(Chinese Taipei) Lee Kun-fang	9
Italy Fabio Petroni	3
(Japan) Hiroshi Takenaka	9
(England) Steve Davis	4
(Chinese Taipei) Yang Ching-shun	9
(United States) Earl Strickland	9
(South Korea) Park Shin-young	6
(Germany) Thorsten Hohmann	2
(United States) Jeremy Jones	9
(Chinese Taipei) Huang Kun-chang	5
(Netherlands) Alex Lely	9
(Mexico) Ernesto Domínguez	3
(Japan) Kunihiko Takahashi	9
(Sweden) Marcus Chamat	9
(United States) Corey Deuel	6
(United States) Nick Varner	7
(Philippines) Alex Pagulayan	9
(Philippines) Ramil Gallego	8
(Japan) Takeshi Okumura	9
(Chinese Taipei) Hung Lu-kung	9
(United States) Shannon Daulton	1

Last 16
(Germany) Oliver Ortmann	5
(Philippines) Efren Reyes	11
(Philippines) Francisco Bustamante	11
(Philippines) Antonio Lining	10
(United States) Johnny Archer	11
(Chinese Taipei) Lee Kun-fang	5
(Japan) Hiroshi Takenaka	9
(Chinese Taipei) Yang Ching-shun	11
(United States) Earl Strickland	11
(United States) Jeremy Jones	8
(Netherlands) Alex Lely	8
(Japan) Kunihiko Takahashi	11
(Sweden) Marcus Chamat	11
(Philippines) Alex Pagulayan	7
(Japan) Takeshi Okumura	11
(Chinese Taipei) Hung Lu-kung	5

Quarter final
(Philippines) Efren Reyes	8
(Philippines) Francisco Bustamante	11
(United States) Johnny Archer	2
(Chinese Taipei) Yang Ching-shun	11
(United States) Earl Strickland	11
(Japan) Kunihiko Takahashi	3
(Sweden) Marcus Chamat	5
(Japan) Takeshi Okumura	11

Semi-final
(Philippines) Francisco Bustamante	11
(Chinese Taipei) Yang Ching-shun	7
(United States) Earl Strickland	11
(Japan) Takeshi Okumura	5

Final
(Philippines) Francisco Bustamante	15
(United States) Earl Strickland	17
