= 2019 WPA Players Championship =

Professional 9-Ball pool tournament, April 2019

2019 Players Championship
Tournament information
- Dates: 12–19 April 2019
- Venue: Griff’s Bar & Billiards,
- City: Las Vegas, Nevada
- Country: United States
- Organisation(s): World Pool-Billiard Association and CueSports International
- Format: Single elimination
- Total prize fund: $66,000
- Winner's share: $10,000

Final
- Champion: Cheng Yu-hsuan (TPE)
- Runner-up: Carlo Biado (PHL)
- Score: 12-11

The 2019 WPA Players Championship was a 9-Ball pool international event held in Las Vegas. The event was organized jointly by the World Pool-Billiard Association (WPA) and CueSports International (CI). The event was played with alternate break rules, from a field of 64, with players qualifying from tours including the WPA and European Pocket Billiard Federation.

== Tournament format ==
The event consisted of a field of 64 players, with qualification spots given to players in the following ratio:

Tournament Qualifiers	16
WPA rankings	16
APBU	8
EPBF	8
BCA	6
CPB	4
AAPA	2
OPBA	2
Wildcard	2
Total	64

Matches were played with a shot clock and under alternate break rules.

=== Prize fund ===
The event had a prize fund of $66,000, with prize money being paid out of the players entrance fees, plus $50,000.

	Prize money
Winner	10,000 $
Finalist	$7,000
Semifinalist	$5,000
Quarterfinalist	$3,000
last 16	$1,500
Last 32	$400
Consolation winner	$1,500
Consolation runner-up	$1,000
Consolation Semifinalist	$500
Consolation Quarterfinalist	$250
Consolation last 16	$150
Total	$66.000
