= Bashar Hussain =

Personal information
- Nationality: Qatar
- Born: Bashar Hussain Abdulmajeed Qatar

Pool career
- Sport: Pool, Snooker

Bashar Hussain Abdulmajeed is a Qatari professional pool and snooker player. A prominent figure in Middle Eastern cue sports, he is a former Asian, Arab, and Gulf champion. He is best known internationally for reaching the quarter-finals of the 2015 World Cup of Pool.

== Career ==
=== Pool ===
Hussain has represented Qatar at the World Cup of Pool on several occasions. At the 2015 event, partnering with Waleed Majid, the Qatari team defeated the sixth seeded United States team (represented by Shane Van Boening and Mike Dechaine) 7–5 in the opening round. They reached the quarter-finals before being eliminated by Japan.

In September 2018, Hussain won the inaugural UAE 9-Ball Arab Open Billiards Championship in Dubai, defeating Iraq's Ehab Hassan 12–9 in the final. He has also been a regular participant in the WPA World Nine-ball Championship, playing world number one Joshua Filler in the 2019 tournament in Doha.

=== Snooker ===
Hussain maintains a dual career in snooker. He has represented Qatar in the Asian Snooker Championship and the IBSF World Snooker Championship. He won a bronze medal at the International Billiards and Snooker Federation team event in 2023. In January 2025, he reached the final of the First Open Snooker Championship in Qatar, finishing as runner-up to Ahmed Saif.

== Titles ==
- UAE 9-Ball Arab Open Winner (2018)
- Arab Billiards Championship (2018)
- GCC Championships (2021)
