= 2020 in cue sports =

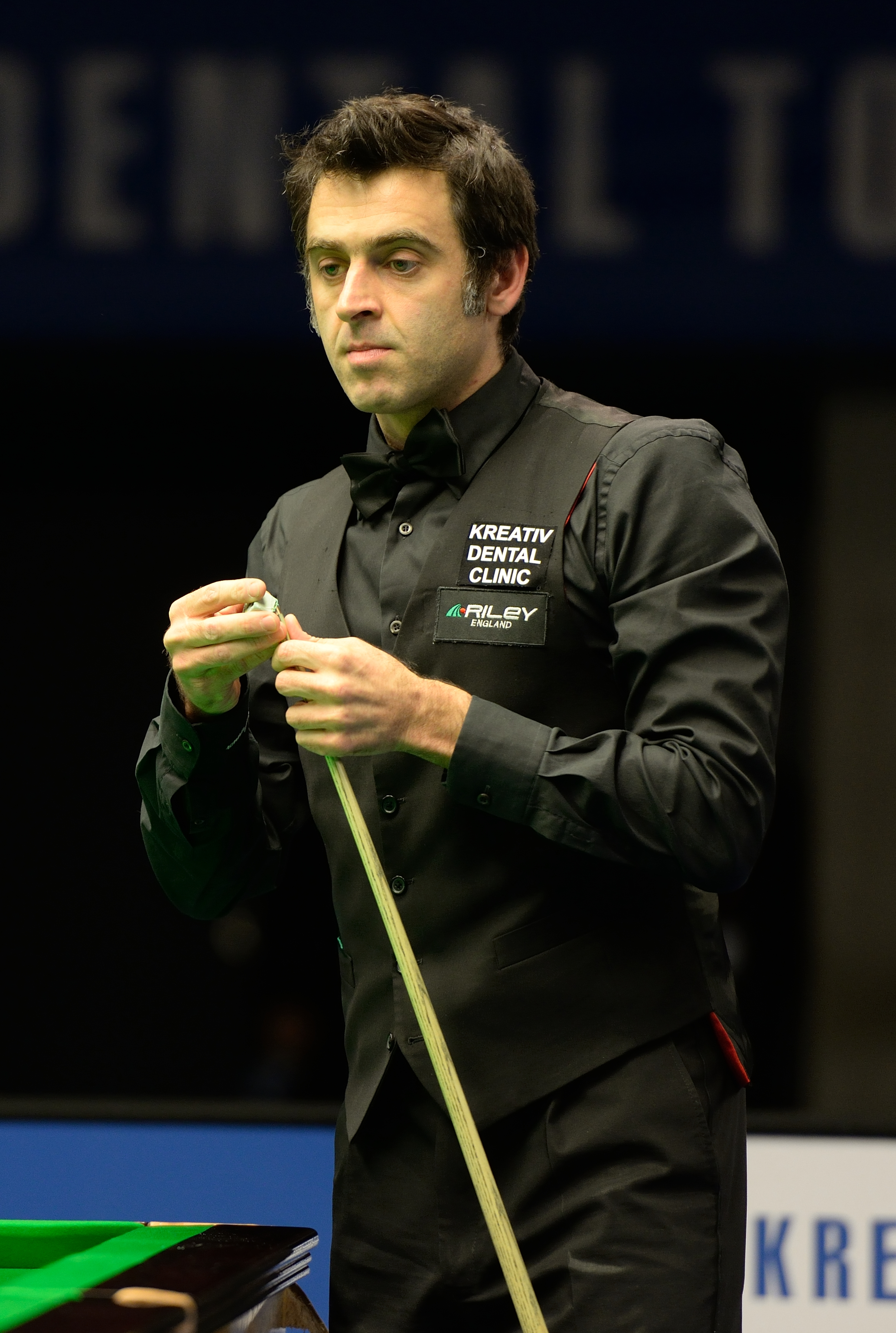
Ronnie O'Sullivan won the only professional world championship held in 2020, defeating Kyren Wilson in the final of the 2020 World Snooker Championship.

Professional tournaments in table-top cue sports took place in 2020. These events include snooker, pool disciplines and billiards. Whilst these are traditionally singles sports, some matches and tournaments are held as doubles or as teams. The snooker season runs between May and April, whilst the pool and billiards seasons is listed over the calendar year. Due to the COVID-19 pandemic, the season was disrupted with many events being cancelled or postponed. Cue sports events were played in January and February, before tournaments were discontinued for all disciplines due to the pandemic, returning in June without an audience.

Ronnie O'Sullivan won the only professional world championship held during the year, the World Snooker Championship. The other Triple Crown events, the UK Championship and Masters, were won by Neil Robertson and Stuart Bingham, respectively. The only major pool tournament held during the year was the Mosconi Cup, won by the European team.

== Pool ==
The cue sport pool encompasses several disciplines, such as straight pool and nine-ball. Events such as the WPA World Nine-ball Championship, World Pool Masters, and the World Cup of Pool, were all postponed to the following year due to the COVID-19 pandemic. The Mosconi Cup, contested between select teams from the US and Europe was played in December.

International pool events
Date(s)	Tournament	Location	Winner	Runner-up	Score	Refs.
December 1–4	Mosconi Cup	England (Coventry)	Europe	USA	11–3	

=== Euro Tour ===
The Euro Tour is a professional nine-ball series run across Europe by the European Pocket Billiard Federation. There was just one event, the Treviso Open, with tournaments for both men and women. For the list now, (m) refers to the men's event and (f) to the women's tournament.

Euro Tour events
Date(s)	Tournament	Location	Winner	Runner-up	Score	Refs.
February 20–22	Treviso Open	Italy (Treviso)	Jayson Shaw; Jasmin Ouschan	Eklent Kaçi; Aleksandra Guleikova	9–8 (m); 7–1 (f)	

== Billiards ==
=== World Billiards events ===
Two World Billiards events were played in 2020, the remaining devices were postponed or cancelled.

World Billiards events
Date(s)	Tournament	Location	Winner	Runner-up	Score	Refs.
January 25	Scottish Open	Scotland (Kirkcaldy)	David Causier	Peter Gilchrist	619–350	
February 14	Sydney Open	Australia (Sydney)	Peter Gilchrist	Joe Minini	811–450	

==== Three-Cushion World Cup ====
The Three-Cushion World Cup traditionally played over several events had a single tournament in 2020.

Three-Cushion World Cup
Date(s)	Tournament	Location	Winner	Runner-up	Score	Refs.
February 17–23	Three-Cushion World Cup – event 1	Turkey (Antalya)	Dani Sánchez	Dick Jaspers	50–35	

== Snooker ==
The World Snooker Tour generally begins in July and ends in May, however due to the COVID-19 pandemic, the 2019–20 snooker season ended in August, whereas the 2020–21 snooker season began in September. Ronnie O'Sullivan won his sixth World Snooker Championship, defeating Kyren Wilson in the final.

=== Snooker world rankings ===
World Snooker Tour ranking events
Date(s)	Tournament	Location	Winner	Runner-up	Score	Refs.
January 22–26	European Masters	Austria (Dornbirn)	Neil Robertson	Zhou Yuelong	9–0	
January 29 – February 2	German Masters	Germany (Berlin)	Judd Trump	Neil Robertson	9–6	
February 3–9	World Grand Prix	England (Cheltenham)	Neil Robertson	Graeme Dott	10–8	
February 10–16	Welsh Open	Wales (Cardiff)	Shaun Murphy	Kyren Wilson	9–1	
February 20–23	Snooker Shoot Out	England (Watford)	Michael Holt	Zhou Yuelong	1–0	
February 24 – March 1	Players Championship	England (Southport)	Judd Trump	Yan Bingtao	10–4	
March 13–15	Gibraltar Open	Gibraltar	Judd Trump	Kyren Wilson	4–3	
June 20–26	Tour Championship	England (Milton Keynes)	Stephen Maguire	Mark Allen	10–6	
July 31 – August 16	World Championship	England (Sheffield)	Ronnie O'Sullivan	Kyren Wilson	18–8	
September 13 – October 30	2020 Championship League	England (Milton Keynes)	Kyren Wilson	Judd Trump	3–1	
September 21–27	2020 European Masters	England (Milton Keynes)	Mark Selby	Martin Gould	9–8	
October 12–18	2020 English Open	England (Milton Keynes)	Judd Trump	Neil Robertson	9–8	
November 16–22	2020 Northern Ireland Open	England (Milton Keynes)	Judd Trump	Ronnie O'Sullivan	9–7	
November 23 – December 6	2020 UK Championship	England (Milton Keynes)	Neil Robertson	Judd Trump	10–9	
December 7–13	2020 Scottish Open	England (Milton Keynes)	Mark Selby	Ronnie O'Sullivan	9–3	
December 14–20	2020 World Grand Prix	England (Milton Keynes)	Judd Trump	Jack Lisowski	10–7	

=== Non-ranking events ===
World Snooker Tour non-ranking events
Date(s)	Tournament	Location	Winner	Runner-up	Score	Refs.
January 12–19	The Masters	England (London)	Stuart Bingham	Ali Carter	10–8	
October 7 – May 3	2019–20 Championship League	England (Leicester)	Scott Donaldson	Graeme Dott	3–0	
July 1–11	2020 Championship League	England (Milton Keynes)	Luca Brecel	N/A	Round-robin	
November 2– 8	2020 Champion of Champions	England (Milton Keynes)	Mark Allen	Neil Robertson	10–6	

=== Challenge Tour ===
The Challenge Tour is a secondary non-professional snooker tour with events for invited players. The final four events of the 2019–20 Challenge Tour were played during 2020.

Challenge Tour events
Date(s)	Tournament	Location	Winner	Runner-up	Score	Refs.
January 18–19	Challenge Tour 8	England (Tamworth)	Lukas Kleckers	Tyler Rees	3–1	
February 15–16	Challenge Tour 9	Wales (Llanelli)	Ashley Hugill	Sydney Wilson	3–1	
March 1–2	Challenge Tour 10	England (Leicester)	Adam Duffy	Kuldesh Johal	3–1	
July 20	Challenge Tour Play Offs	England (Sheffield)	Allan Taylor	Adam Duffy	4–0	

=== World Seniors Tour ===
The World Seniors Tour is an amateur series open to players aged 40 and over. There was a single event in the 2020 World Seniors Tour.

World Seniors events
Date(s)	Tournament	Location	Winner	Runner-up	Score	Refs.
August 19–22	World Seniors Championship	England (Sheffield)	Jimmy White	Ken Doherty	5–4	

=== Women's events ===
The women's tour is an amateur tour, with one event held in Belgium during 2020.

Women's snooker international tournaments
Date(s)	Tournament	Location	Winner	Runner-up	Score	Refs.
January 31 – February 2	Belgium Women's Open	Belgium (Bruges)	Ng On-yee	Reanne Evans	4–2	

=== Amateur events ===
The English Amateur Championship was played in 2020, the hundredth staging of the event.

Women's snooker international tournaments
Date(s)	Tournament	Location	Winner	Runner-up	Score	Refs.
5–8 February 2020	English Amateur Championship	England (Cheltenham)	Ben Hancorn	Rory McLeod	5–3	
