= Cheng Yu-hsuan =

Taiwanese pool player

Cheng Yu-Hsung
Personal information
- Born: 2 May 1988 (age 38)

Pool career
- Country: Chinese Taipei
- Pool games: 9-Ball
- Best finish: Semi finals 2016 WPA World Nine-ball Championship

Tournament wins
- Major: U.S. Open 9-Ball Championship (2015)
- Current rank: 23
- Highest rank: 1

Cheng Yu-hsuan, also sometimes known as Kevin Cheng (born 2 May 1988), is a Taiwanese professional pool player, representing Chinese Taipei. Yu-Hsuan reached world number 1 in 9-Ball in 2016, following winning U.S. Open 9-Ball Championships in 2015. He also reached the semi-finals of the 2016 WPA World Nine-ball Championship; where he would lose to Shane Van Boening 11–9.

== Achievements ==
- 2019 WPA Players Championship
- 2015 U.S. Open 9-Ball Championship
- 2015 CBSA Miyun 9-Ball Open
- 2015 Side Pocket Open Shreveport, LA
- 2015 White Diamond Open Lafayette, LA
