= Felix Vogel =

German pool player

Personal information
- Nickname: The Birdman | The Smiling Virtuoso
- Born: 2 December 2007 (age 18) Leverkusen

Pool career
- Country: Germany
- Turned pro: 2024

Felix Vogel (born December 2, 2007) is a German professional pool player. Considered a rising star, Vogel won the 2026 Pro Billiard Series Billard Beckmann men's open. Despite having only played professionally for a short time, Vogel has defeated such players as Mario He, Earl Strickland, Jason Shaw and Carlo Biado in various disciplines.

== Career ==
Vogel began playing pool with his father in the lowest German league at the age of 8, standing on a box to reach the table. His father quickly noticed his talent, and he began to undergo serious coaching at the age of 9. By age 12, Vogel had been nominated for the national German youth squad; at 14 he won the European under-17 Ten-ball championship.

Vogel's first significant professional earnings came in 2024, with him placing 2nd in the Tallinn Open and 33rd in the Qatar world cup of 10-ball, with a combined yearly earnings of $8,306. At this time Vogel also became a Cuetech and Dynamic Billiards sponsored player. Vogel's profile continued to rise following his undefeated victory at the 2025 Jason Shaw Junior Open, as well as his last 16 placing in the 2025 Scottish Open. Competing in the 2025 World Nine-ball Championship, Vogel won his first Matchroom Pool major match at the 2025 Florida open. His most high-profile victory came at the 2025 Battle of the Bull, where he defeated world-champion Carlo Biado 9–6, and went on to make it to the quarter finals.

Vogel defeated five-time title holder Earl Strickland 9–2 in the first round of the 2025 US Open.

In his first tournament victory on the men's singles pro circuit, Vogel won the 2026 Predator Billard Beckmann Men's Open, defeating Wu Kun Lin two sets to one, 4–2, 2–4, 4–2. This tournament would also net him his biggest single payout of US$37,000.

== Titles and achievements ==
- 2026 Euro Tour Spanish Open
- 2026 Predator Billard Beckmann Men's Open
