= Evgeny Stalev =

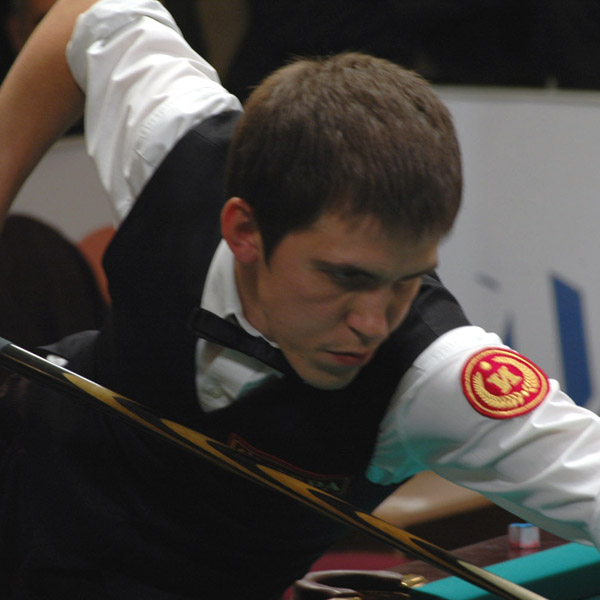

Personal information
- Born: 19 May 1979 (age 46)

Sport
- Country: Russia
- Sport: Russian billiards, Nine-ball

Achievements and titles
- World finals: Pyramid (1999, 2000)

Evgeny Evgenyevich Stalev (Russian: Евгений Евгеньевич Сталев; born 19 May 1979, Lytkarino) is a Russian professional player of Russian billiards and nine-ball. He was the 2000 world champion and 2003 Asian champion in Russian billiards.

== Titles ==
- 2003 Russian Pyramid Asian Championship
- 2000 WPA World Pyramid Championship
- 1999 WPA World Pyramid Championship
- 1998 Euro Tour Spain Open
- 1996 Polish Pool Championship 9-Ball
- 1995 Polish Pool Championship 9-Ball

Inaugural champion	WPA World Pyramid Champion; 1999 and 2000	Succeeded by Kanibek Saghyndkov
