= Christian Reimering =

German pool player, born August 1971

Personal information
- Nickname: Criki
- Born: 8 August 1971 (age 54) Leverkusen, Germany

Pool career
- Turned pro: 1999

Christian Reimering is a professional pool player from Leverkusen, Germany. Reimering reached the last-16 stage of the world championship on four occasions. He did so at the 1993, 1998, and 2010 event in nine-ball, and the 2005 WPA World Eight-ball Championship.

Reimering is a two-time winner of Euro Tour events, winning the 2005 Costa Del Sol and 2007 Italian Open.

== Titles ==
- 2005 Euro Tour Costa Del Sol Open
- 2007 Euro Tour Italian Open
