= Wojciech Szewczyk =

Polish pool player (born 1994)

Personal information
- Nickname: "MasterChef"
- Born: 1 September 1994 (age 32) Warsaw, Poland

Pool career
- Country: Poland
- Pool games: 9-ball, ten-ball
- Best finish: Quarter finals 2015 WPA World Nine-ball Championship

Tournament wins
- World Champion: Ten-ball (2022, 2026)
- Current rank: 2

Wojciech Szewczyk (born 1 September 1994) is a Polish professional pool player.

Szewczyk is a two time junior European Pool Championship winner, winning the 8-ball event in 2010, defeating Finn Eschment in the final, and the 9-ball event in 2011 defeating Lars Kuckherm in the final. He is also a former Euro Tour event runner-up, losing in the final of the 2012 Austria Open, losing in the final to Nikos Ekonomopoulos 9–4.

== Titles & Achievements ==
- 2026 WPA World Ten-ball Championship
- 2026 Euro Tour Turkish Open
- 2025 China Open Nine-ball Championship
- 2023 PRP Nine-Ball Open
- 2023 Longoni 9-Ball League (with Mieszko Fortuński)
- 2023 European Pool Championship 9-ball
- 2022 WPA World Ten-ball Championship
- 2021 Polish Pool Championship Nine-ball
- 2020 Polish Pool Championship Eight-ball
- 2019 Polish Pool Championship Nine-ball
- 2019 Polish Pool Championship Eight-ball
- 2018 Polish Pool Championship Nine-ball
- 2018 Predator Bucharest Open
