= Michael Schmidt (pool player) =

German pool player

Personal information
- Born: 6 April 1966 (age 60) Bremen, Germany

Pool career
- Country: Germany
- Pool games: 9-Ball

Michael Schmidt (born 6 April 1966 in Bremen, Germany) is a German professional pool player. After turning professional in 1991, he continually reached the knockout rounds of the WPA World Nine-ball Championships. He represented Germany at the 2002 World Pool Masters, where he reached the last 16 before losing to Marcus Chamat.

Schmidt has two runner-up finishes at Euro Tour events, the 1996 German Open and 2001 Austrian Open, and four third-place finishes on the tour.
