= Roman Hybler =

Czech professional pool player (born 1977)

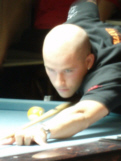

Personal information
- Nickname: "Czech Attack"
- Born: 27 December 1977 (age 48) Liberec, Czech Republic

Pool career
- Country: Czech Republic

Tournament wins
- Minor: 2002 German Open

Roman Hybler (born 27 December 1977 in Liberec, Czech Republic) is a Czech professional pool player. Hybler is most well known for winning the 2002 German Open Euro Tour event.

== Career ==
Hybler took up pool aged 12. His first club was the PBC Woodstock Germering; later he moved to PBC Olympics Munich, for which he won several titles at the German Junior Championships. In 2001, Hybler entered his first international tournament, as a part of the Euro Tour, and a year later won his only Tour championship, the 2002 German Open, defeating Klaus Zobrekis in the final. The same year, Hybler also entered his first world championship, the 2002 WPA World Nine-ball Championship reaching the knockout round, finishing 33rd.

Hybler is a three time semi-finalist at the European Pool Championships, and reached the last 16 of the world championships on three occasions.

== Titles ==
- 2002 Euro Tour German Open
