= Nikos Ekonomopoulos =

Greek pool player (born 1982)

Personal information
- Born: February 22, 1982 (age 44) Athens

Pool career
- Country: Greece
- Pool games: 9-Ball

Nikos Ekonomopoulos (Greek Νίκος Οικονομόπουλος Nikos Ikonomopoulos, also: Nickos Ekonomopoulos ; born 22 February 1982 in Athens) is a Greek professional pool player. Ekonomopoulos won the Junior 8-ball World Championship in 2000. Ekonomopoulos reached the final of the 2014 World Pool Masters losing to Shane Van Boening in the final 8–2.

== Titles ==
- 2012 Euro Tour Austria Open
