= Tobias Bongers =

German pool player

Personal information
- Nationality: German
- Born: February 3, 1995 (age 31) Duisburg, Germany

Pool career

Tobias Bongers (born February 3, 1995) is a German professional pool player. Bongers was runner-up at the 2012 WPA World Junior Nine-ball Championship, and won the straight pool event at the 2025 European Pool Championships. Later that year, he reached the quarter-finals of the WNT European Open in Fulda. He has been a runner-up at two Euro Tour events: at the 2025 Dutch Open, and 2024 St Pongau Open. Bongers has represented Germany at both junior and senior international levels.

In 2024, he reached the quarter-finals of the UK Open Pool Championship, where he completed a victory over world champion Francisco Sánchez Ruiz.
