= Mieszko Fortuński =

Polish pool player

Personal information
- Nickname: "The Butcher"
- Born: 1 April 1992 (age 34) Lubin, Poland

Pool career

Tournament wins
- Minor: 2016 Italian Open
- Current rank: 26

Mieszko Fortuński (born 1 April 1992 in Lubin, Poland) is a Polish professional pool player. He was the winner of the Euro Tour event 2016 Italian Open. Fortuński is a three-time winner of the European Pool Championships, winning the ten-ball event in 2019, and the represented Poland in the team event, winning in 2015 and 2018.

== Titles & Achievements ==
- 2025 Euro Tour Austrian Open
- 2024 Polish Pool Championship 9-Ball
- 2023 Longoni 9-Ball League (with Wojciech Szewczyk)
- 2021 European Pool Championship Ten-Ball
- 2016 Euro Tour Italian Open
- 2019 European Pool Championship Ten-Ball
- 2019 Polish Pool Championship Ten-Ball
- 2018 Polish Pool Championship Eight-Ball
- 2017 Polish Pool Championship Nine-Ball
- 2014 Polish Pool Championship Ten-Ball
- 2014 Polish Pool Championship Nine-Ball
- 2010 Polish Pool Championship Nine-Ball
