= Mateusz Śniegocki =

Polish pool player

Personal information
- Nickname: Śniegol
- Born: 3 January 1985 (age 41) Poznań, Poland
- Website: www.mateuszsniegocki.pl

Pool career
- Country: Poland
- Pool games: 9-Ball

Mateusz Śniegocki (born 3 January 1985) is a Polish professional pool player. Śniegocki is a former 10-Ball European champion and three-time winner of events at the Euro Tour.

== Career ==
Śniegocki started playing billiards in a club called "Hades" in 1999, winning 5 national junior titles before 2005. Śniegocki won his first Euro Tour event in 2013 at the Bosnia & Herzegovina Open, before winning the 10-Ball event at the European Pool Championships later that year. In following years, Śniegocki won two more Euro Tour events, the 2015 Portugal Open, and the 2016 Albanian Open.

== Titles & Achievements ==
- 2026 Euro Tour Italian Open
- 2024 Euro Tour Italian Open
- 2016 Euro Tour Albanian Open
- 2015 Euro Tour Portugal Open
- 2013 Euro Tour Bosnia & Herzegovina Open
- 2013 European Pool Championship Ten-ball
- 2012 Kremlin Cup
- 2009 Polish Pool Championship Nine-ball
- 2006 Polish Pool Championship Nine-ball
- 2006 Polish Pool Championship Eight-ball
- 2005 Polish Pool Championship Nine-ball
