= Joshua Filler =

German pool player (born 1997)

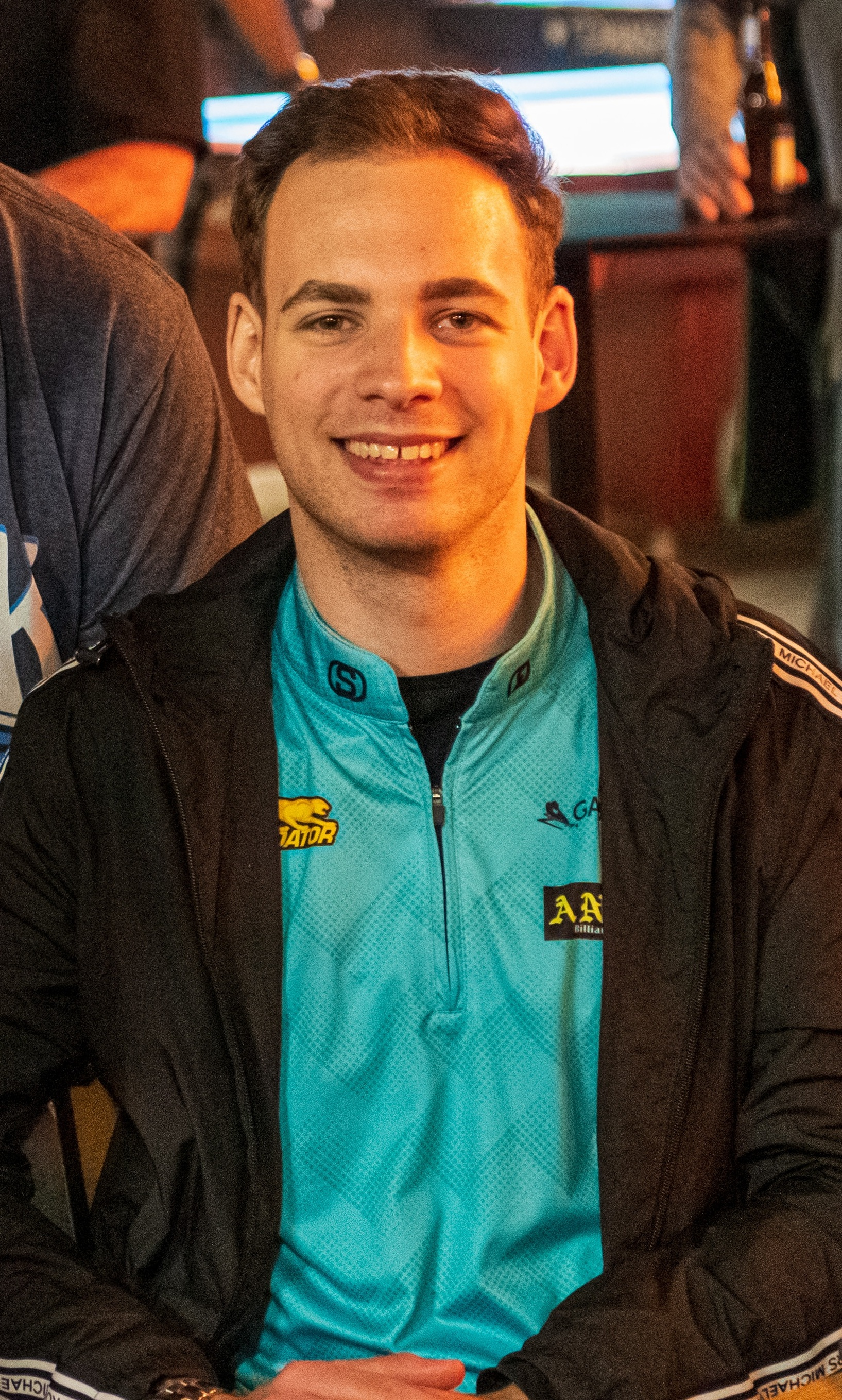
- Joshua Filler at the 2022 Straight Pool tournament, October 26, 2022

Personal information
- Nickname: The Killer
- Born: 2 October 1997 (age 29) Bönen, North Rhine-Westphalia, Germany

Pool career
- Country: GER
- Pool games: Nine-ball, Ten-ball, Eight-ball, Straight Pool

Tournament wins
- World Champion: Nine-ball (2018), Eight-ball (2024)
- Highest rank: 1

Joshua Filler (born 2 October 1997) is a German professional pool player from Bönen, Germany. In 2018 Filler defeated Carlo Biado 13–10 to win the 2018 WPA World Nine-ball Championship. In 2017 he was the youngest player to win the China Open, and in 2018 he also won the 10-ball European Pool Championships. Filler became WPA and Euro Tour world number 1 in 2019, and later he reached the final of the 2019 WPA World Ten-ball Championship before losing 10–7 to Ko Ping-chung.

Filler has also represented Europe in the Mosconi Cup, winning the MVP award at the 2017, 2022 and 2023 events.

== Career ==
Filler started to play billiards at the age of seven, competing at a national level by 2007 (age 10). In 2017, Filler made his debut at the Mosconi Cup, representing Europe. He became the youngest player to do so in history, at 20 years of age. The following year, he won the China Open 9-ball tournament, and the ten-ball European Pool Championships.

Later, in 2018, Filler won his first world championship. Filler defeated the defending champion Carlo Biado in the final of the 2018 WPA World Nine-ball Championship to win the event. Filler had also won a bronze medal at the European Pool Championships earlier that season.

In 2019, Filler overcame Wu Jia-qing of China with a 13–10 final victory to win the 2019 U.S. Open 9-Ball Championship.

In 2021, Filler alongside his partner Christoph Reintjes captured the World Cup of Pool after taking down Great Britain's tandem of Darren Appleton and Karl Boyes, 11–7, to win the title.

In 2022, Filler claimed the Inaugural UK Open Pool Championship beating Francisco Sanchez Ruiz in the final 13-7 held at the Copper Box Arena, London. Also in 2022, Filler won the World Pool Masters defeating Lo Ho Sum, 9–6, in the final at the Europa Point Sports Complex, Gibraltar.

In 2023, Joshua Filler, Pia Filler, and Moritz Neuhausen won the WPA World Teams Championship by defeating Team Chinese Taipei in a sudden shootout.

In 2024, he won his second world championship after winning the WPA World Eight-ball Championship, beating Hsu Jui-an of Chinese Taipei. Later on that year, Filler won his 3rd title at the China Nine-ball Open after defeating Japanese Hayato Hijikata 11–6 in the final.

Filler is one of many players negatively impacted by the Professional pool governance dispute (2022–2025).

== Personal life ==
Filler is married to fellow German pool player Pia Filler.

== Titles and achievements ==
- 2026 Qatar World Cup Ten-ball Championship
- 2026 Reyes Cup
- 2026 Predator Aramith Ten-ball Open
- 2026 UK Open Pool Championship
- 2026 Euro Tour Luxembourg Open
- 2026 Predator Las Vegas Open Ten-ball
- 2026 Predator Mixed Doubles Turbo Open
- 2026 Derby City Classic Nine-ball
- 2025 Jacksonville Ten-ball Open
- 2025 Mosconi Cup
- 2025 Box Billiards Mixed Doubles Open
- 2025 Buffalo's Pro Classic One Pocket
- 2025 Euro Tour Estonian Open
- 2025 European Open Nine-ball Championship
- 2025 Euro Tour Italian Open
- 2025 Derby City Classic Nine-ball
- 2024 Challenge of Champions Grand Final
- 2024 China Open 9-ball Championship
- 2024 WPA World Eight-ball Championship
- 2024 Knight Shot Dubai Open Nine-ball
- 2024 Derby City Classic Master of the Table
- 2024 Derby City Classic Nine-ball
- 2024 Derby City Classic Bank pool
- 2024 Derby City Classic Bigfoot Ten-ball Challenge
- 2023 AZBilliards Player of the Year
- 2023 Mosconi Cup (MVP)
- 2023 Mosconi Cup
- 2023 Euro Tour Treviso Open
- 2023 WPA World Mixed Teams Ten-ball Championship
- 2023 Euro Tour Lasko Open
- 2023 Qatar Open 9-Ball Championship
- 2023 Predator Wisconsin Open
- 2023 China Open 9-Ball Championship
- 2023 Euro Tour Terme Olimia Open
- 2023 Euro Tour Austria Open
- 2022 Mosconi Cup (MVP)
- 2022 Mosconi Cup
- 2022 Euro Tour Lasko Open
- 2022 World Pool Masters
- 2022 U.K. Open Nine-ball Championship
- 2022 World Games Nine-ball Singles
- 2022 European Pool Championship 14.1
- 2022 Euro Tour Treviso Open
- 2022 Derby City Classic Bigfoot Ten-ball Challenge
- 2021 Mosconi Cup
- 2021 American Straight Pool Championship
- 2021 World Cup of Pool - with (Christoph Reintjes)
- 2021 European Pool Championship Nine-ball
- 2021 International Bigfoot Ten-ball Challenge
- 2021 Euro Tour Austria Open
- 2020 Mosconi Cup
- 2019 AZBilliards Player of the Year
- 2019 World Team Trophy Nine-Ball
- 2019 U.S. Open Nine-ball Championship
- 2019 Euro Tour Leende Open
- 2019 World Pool Series Predator Grand Finale
- 2018 WPA World Nine-ball Championship
- 2018 World Pool Series Ten-Ball Championship
- 2018 European Pool Championship Ten-ball
- 2017 Mosconi Cup (MVP)
- 2017 Mosconi Cup
- 2017 China Open 9-Ball Championship
- 2016 German Pool Championship Ten-ball
- 2015 German Pool Championship Ten-ball
- 2015 German Pool Championship Eight-ball
- 2015 German Pool Championship 14.1
