= 2026 UK Open Pool Championship =

UK Open pool championship, held May 2026

Tournament information
- Dates: 26–31 May 2026
- Venue: Brentwood Centre
- City: Brentwood
- Country: United Kingdom
- Organisation: Matchroom Pool
- Format: Double elimination and single-elimination
- Total prize fund: $225,000
- Winner's share: $40,000

Final
- Champion: Joshua Filler (GER)
- Runner-up: Wojciech Szewczyk (POL)
- Score: 13–1

The 2026 UK Open Pool Championship was a nine-ball pool tournament that took place from 26 to 31 May 2026 at the Brentwood Centre in Brentwood, England. It was the fifth edition of the UK Open Pool Championship, first held in 2022. The winner received $40,000 from a total prize fund of $225,000.

Aloysius Yapp was the defending champion, having defeated Jonás Souto 13–1 in the 2025 final. Souto eliminated Yapp in the quarter-finals. Joshua Filler defeated Wojciech Szewczyk 13–1 in the final to claim his second UK Open title.

== Overview ==
First held in 2022, the UK Open Pool Championship is a nine-ball pool tournament. Joshua Filler won the inaugural edition, staged in London, defeating Francisco Sánchez Ruiz 13–7 in the final. The 2026 edition of the tournament—its fifth staging—took place from 26 to 31 May 2026 at the Brentwood Centre in Brentwood, England. Aloysius Yapp was the defending champion, having defeated Jonás Souto 13–1 in the 2025 final.

=== Format ===
A total of 256 players took part in the event, which used a double-elimination format until the last-128 round; it became a single-elimination tournament from the last-64 round onwards. During the double-elimination stage, the matches were played as a race to 8 and 9 racks. From the last-64 round through to the quarter-finals, the matches were played as a race to 10 racks. The semi-finals were played as a race to 11 and the final was a race to 13 racks.

=== Prize fund ===
The winner received $40,000 from a total prize fund of $225,000. The breakdown of prize money is shown below:

- Winner: $40,000
- Runner-up: $18,000
- Semi-finals: $10,000
- Quarter-finals: $7,150
- 9th–16th: $4,000
- 17th–32nd: $2,000
- 33rd–64th: $1,000
- 65th–128th: $350
- Total: $225,000

== Main draw ==
The results of the main draw, from the last-64 round through to the semi-finals, are shown below.

Last 64; Race to 10 racks
Dean Shields (GBR)	10
Fitim Haradinaj (KOS)	4
Francisco Sánchez Ruiz (ESP)	10
Mieszko Fortunski (POL)	3
Jayson Shaw (GBR)	10
Besar Spahiu (ALB)	4
Duong Quoc Hoang (VNM)	10
Maks Benko (SVN)	1
David Alcaide (ESP)	10
Imran Majid (GBR)	0
Lukas Fracasso-Verner (USA)	10
Boris Ivanovski (GER)	5
Thorsten Hohmann (USA)	4
Elliott Sanderson (GBR)	10
Wiktor Zielinski (POL)	10
Ronel Nalaunan (PHL)	1
Joshua Filler (GER)	10
Niklas Dohr (GER)	8
Gary Wilson (GBR)	10
Joe Prince (GBR)	3
Mario He (AUT)	10
Tobias Bongers (GER)	9
Kledio Kaci (ALB)	10
Fraser Patrick (GBR)	7
Robbie Capito (HKG)	4
Casper Matikainen (FIN)	10
Niels Feijen (NED)	10
Quinten Pongers (NED)	6
Alex Kazakis (GRE)	10
Konrad Juszczyszyn (POL)	6
Francesco Candela (ITA)	6
Tyler Styer (USA)	10

Last 32; Race to 10 racks
Dean Shields (GBR)	10
Francisco Sánchez Ruiz (ESP)	9
Jayson Shaw (GBR)	10
Duong Quoc Hoang (VNM)	8
David Alcaide (ESP)	10
Lukas Fracasso-Verner (USA)	3
Elliott Sanderson (GBR)	10
Wiktor Zielinski (POL)	8
Joshua Filler (GER)	10
Gary Wilson (GBR)	1
Mario He (AUT)	10
Kledio Kaci (ALB)	4
Casper Matikainen (FIN)	8
Niels Feijen (NED)	10
Alex Kazakis (GRE)	10
Tyler Styer (USA)	7

Last 16; Race to 10 racks
Dean Shields (GBR)	6
Jayson Shaw (GBR)	10
David Alcaide (ESP)	10
Elliott Sanderson (GBR)	4
Joshua Filler (GER)	10
Mario He (AUT)	2
Niels Feijen (NED)	10
Alex Kazakis (GRE)	4

Quarter-finals; Race to 10 racks
Jayson Shaw (GBR)	10
David Alcaide (ESP)	8
Joshua Filler (GER)	10
Niels Feijen (NED)	7

Semi-finals; Race to 11 racks
Jayson Shaw (GBR)	2
Joshua Filler (GER)	11

Last 64; Race to 10 racks
Eklent Kaçi (ALB)	10
Kostiantyn Ivanov (UKR)	2
Sanjin Pehlivanovic (BIH)	10
Marc Bijsterbosch (NED)	4
Wojciech Szewczyk (POL)	10
Marcel Price (GBR)	3
Mateusz Śniegocki (POL)	10
Bernie Regalario (PHL)	7
Naoyuki Ōi (JAP)	10
Felix Vogel (GER)	1
Maximilian Lechner (AUT)	10
Dimitris Loukatos (GRE)	7
Michael Baoanan (PHL)	7
Stuart Bingham (GBR)	10
Karl Gnadeberg (EST)	8
Fabio Rizzi (FRA)	10
Pijus Labutis (LTU)	10
Ricardo Gutjahr (GER)	6
Marvin Asis (PHL)	10
Georgi Georgiev (BUL)	6
Oliver Szolnoki (HUN)	10
Lo Ho Sum (HKG)	3
Jonás Souto (ESP)	10
Antonis Brabin (CYP)	7
Jefrey Roda (PHL)	5
Mustafa Alnar (TUR)	10
Alexis Ferrer (PHL)	10
Roman Hybler (CZE)	3
Denis Grabe (EST)	10
Harry Vergara (PHL)	7
Aloysius Yapp (SGP)	10
Nick Chatoupis (GRE)	2

Last 32; Race to 10 racks
Eklent Kaçi (ALB)	10
Sanjin Pehlivanovic (BIH)	4
Wojciech Szewczyk (POL)	10
Mateusz Śniegocki (POL)	5
Naoyuki Ōi (JAP)	10
Maximilian Lechner (AUT)	5
Stuart Bingham (GBR)	9
Fabio Rizzi (FRA)	10
Pijus Labutis (LTU)	10
Marvin Asis (PHL)	3
Oliver Szolnoki (HUN)	8
Jonás Souto (ESP)	10
Mustafa Alnar (TUR)	10
Alexis Ferrer (PHL)	9
Denis Grabe (EST)	2
Aloysius Yapp (SGP)	10

Last 16; Race to 10 racks
Eklent Kaçi (ALB)	4
Wojciech Szewczyk (POL)	10
Naoyuki Ōi (JAP)	10
Fabio Rizzi (FRA)	7
Pijus Labutis (LTU)	4
Jonás Souto (ESP)	10
Mustafa Alnar (TUR)	6
Aloysius Yapp (SGP)	10

Quarter-finals; Race to 10 racks
Wojciech Szewczyk (POL)	10
Naoyuki Ōi (JAP)	7
Jonás Souto (ESP)	10
Aloysius Yapp (SGP)	8

Semi-finals; Race to 11 racks
Wojciech Szewczyk (POL)	11
Jonás Souto (ESP)	3
