= 2026 Scottish Open (pool) =

Scottish Open pool championship, held May 2026

Tournament information
- Dates: 20–23 May 2026
- Venue: McGoldrick's Pool and Sports Bar
- City: Glasgow
- Country: United Kingdom
- Organisation: Matchroom Pool
- Format: Double elimination and single-elimination
- Total prize fund: $46,000
- Winner's share: $10,000

Final
- Champion: Olivér Szolnoki (HUN)
- Runner-up: Albert Januarta (IDN)
- Score: 11–5

The 2026 Scottish Open (also known as the 2026 Jacoby Scottish Open for sponsorship reasons) was a nine-ball pool tournament that took place from 20 to 23 May 2026 at the McGoldrick's Pool and Sports Bar in Glasgow, Scotland. It was the fourth edition of the Scottish Open, first held in 2023. The winner received $10,000 from a total prize fund of $46,000.

Mickey Krause was the defending champion, having defeated Aloysius Yapp 10–3 in the 2025 final. Olivér Szolnoki defeated Albert Januarta 11–5 in the final to claim his first Scottish Open title.

== Overview ==
First held in 2023, the Scottish Open is a nine-ball pool tournament. Jayson Shaw won the inaugural edition, defeating Wiktor Zieliński 10–9 in the final. The 2026 edition of the tournament—its fourth staging—took place from 20 to 23 May 2026 at the McGoldrick's Pool and Sports Bar in Glasgow, Scotland. Mickey Krause was the defending champion, having defeated Aloysius Yapp 10–3 in the 2025 final.

=== Format ===
The event used a double-elimination format until the last-16 round; it became a single-elimination tournament from the quarter-finals round onwards. The matches of the quarter-finals and semi-finals were played as a race to 10 racks. The final was a race to 11 racks.

=== Prize fund ===
The winner received $10,000 from a total prize fund of $46,000. The breakdown of prize money is shown below:

- Winner: $10,000
- Runner-up: $6,000
- Semi-finals: $3,000
- Quarter-finals: $2,000
- Last 16: $1,250
- Qualification: $750
- Total: $46,000

== Main draw ==
The results of the main draw, from the quarter-finals onwards, are shown below.

Quarter-finals; Race to 10 racks
Aloysius Yapp (SGP) | 7
George Antonakis (GRE) | 10
Jonás Souto (ESP) | 6
Albert Januarta (IDN) | 10
Jayson Shaw (GBR) | 10
Jokubas Silantjevas (LIT) | 3
Olivér Szolnoki (HUN) | 10
Pijus Labutis (LIT) | 4

Semi-finals; Race to 10 racks
George Antonakis (GRE) | 6
Albert Januarta (IDN) | 10
Jayson Shaw (GBR) | 4
Olivér Szolnoki (HUN) | 10

Final; Race to 11 racks
Albert Januarta (IDN) | 5
Olivér Szolnoki (HUN) | 11
