= 2023 World Cup of Pool =

Pool Tournament

2023 World Cup of Pool XVI
Tournament information
- Dates: 27 June–2 July 2023
- Venue: Pazo de Feiras e Congresos de Lugo
- City: Lugo
- Country: Spain
- Organisation: Matchroom Sport
- Total prize fund: $250,000
- Winner's share: $60,000
- Defending champion: Spain

Final
- Champion: Philippines; James Aranas; Johann Chua
- Runner-up: Germany; Joshua Filler; Moritz Neuhausen
- Score: 11–7

The 2023 World Cup of Pool was a professional pool doubles tournament, and the 16th edition of the World Cup of Pool. The event was contested by 32 pairs representing different nations, and took place at the Pazo de Feiras e Congresos de Lugo in Lugo, Spain, from 27 June to 2 July 2023.

The Spanish team of Francisco Sánchez Ruiz and David Alcaide were the defending champions, but they were eliminated by the Philippine team consisting of James Aranas and Johann Chua in the first round of the tournament. Aranas and Chua would go on to win their country its fourth World Cup title.

== Prize fund ==
The total prize money for the event:

- Winners (per pair): $60,000
- Runners-up (per pair): $30,000
- Semi-finalists (per pair): $15,000
- Quarter-finalists (per pair): $9,000
- Last 16 losers (per pair): $4,500
- Last 32 losers (per pair): $3,625

== Teams ==
Each competing nation features two players, with the hosts, Spain, receiving two places.

The competing teams were made of the players below:

- Eklent Kaçi & Besar Spahiu (ALB)
- Justin Sajich & James Georgiadis (AUS)
- Albin Ouschan & Mario He (AUT)
- Sanjin Pehlivanović & Ajdin Piknjač (BIH)
- John Morra & Alex Pagulayan (CAN)
- Wu Jia-qing & Wang Can (CHN)
- Ko Pin-yi & Ko Ping-chung (TPE)
- Mika Immonen & Petri Makkonen (FIN)
- Joshua Filler & Moritz Neuhausen (GER)
- Jayson Shaw & Elliott Sanderson (GBR)
- Alexander Kazakis & Nikos Ekonomopoulos (GRE)
- Robbie Capito & Lo Ho Sum (HKG)
- Olivér Szolnoki & Attila Bezdan (HUN)
- Daniele Corrieri & Francesco Candela (ITA)
- Naoyuki Ōi & Masato Yoshioka (JPN)
- Abdullah Alyousef & Bader Alawadhi (KUW)
- Phone Myint Kyaw & Thaw Zin Htet (MYA)
- Niels Feijen & Marc Bijsterbosch (NED)
- Matt Edwards & Sullivan Clark (NZL)
- Gerson Martinez & Christopher Tevez (PER)
- James Aranas & Johann Chua (PHI)
- Wiktor Zieliński & Konrad Juszczyszyn (POL)
- Khalid Alghamdi & Mohannad Hamoud Alghumayz (KSA)
- Aleksa Pecelj & Lazar Kostić (SRB)
- Aloysius Yapp & Sharik Sayed (SGP)
- Seo Seoa & Kang Lee (KOR)
- Francisco Sánchez Ruiz & David Alcaide (ESP)
- Jonás Souto & Jose Alberto Delgado (ESP)
- Mohammad Soufi & Zaid Al Shariti (SYR)
- Ali Nasser Al Obaidli & Bashar Hussein (QAT)
- Shane Van Boening & Skyler Woodward (USA)
- Dương Quốc Hoàng & Nguyễn Anh Tuấn (VIE)

== Tournament bracket ==
Round 1 Race to 7
1	Spain	5
Philippines	7
16	Spain B	7
Saudi Arabia	1
9	Netherlands	7
Hong Kong	4
8	Chinese Taipei	7
Finland	1
5	Great Britain	7
Qatar	0
12	Kuwait	3
Vietnam	7
13	Hungary	1
Bosnia and Herzegovina	7
4	Austria	7
Australia	6
3	Germany	7
New Zealand	2
14	Canada	7
Myanmar	2
11	Albania	7
Peru	3
6	Poland	7
Serbia	2
7	Greece	6
Singapore	7
10	Syria	3
China	7
15	Japan	7
Italy	4
2	United States	7
South Korea	1

Round 2 Race to 7
Philippines	7
16	Spain B	2
9	Netherlands	2
8	Chinese Taipei	7
5	Great Britain	7
Vietnam	6
Bosnia and Herzegovina	3
4	Austria	7
3	Germany	7
14	Canada	4
11	Albania	3
6	Poland	7
Singapore	6
China	7
15	Japan	7
2	United States	5

Quarter-finals; Race to 9
Philippines	9
8	Chinese Taipei	8
5	Great Britain	4
4	Austria	9
3	Germany	9
6	Poland	7
China	9
15	Japan	5

Semi-finals; Race to 9
Philippines	9
4	Austria	8
3	Germany	9
China	7

Final; Race to 11
Philippines	11
3	Germany	7
