= 2025 UK Open Pool Championship =

UK Open pool championship, held May 2025

Tournament information
- Dates: 6–11 May 2025
- Venue: Telford International Centre
- City: Telford
- Country: United Kingdom
- Organisation: Matchroom Pool
- Format: Double elimination and single-elimination
- Total prize fund: $200,000
- Winner's share: $40,000

Final
- Champion: Aloysius Yapp (SGP)
- Runner-up: Jonás Souto (ESP)
- Score: 13–1

The 2025 UK Open Pool Championship was a nine-ball pool tournament that took place from 6 to 11 May 2025 at the Telford International Centre in Telford, England. It was the fourth edition of the UK Open Pool Championship, first held in 2022. The winner received $40,000 from a total prize fund of $200,000.

Robbie Capito was the defending champion, having defeated Mieszko Fortunski 13–10 in the 2024 final. Capito lost to Aloysius Yapp in the last-64 round. Yapp went on to win the tournament, by defeating Jonás Souto 13–1 in the final to claim his first UK Open title.

== Overview ==
First held in 2022, the UK Open Pool Championship is a nine-ball pool tournament. Joshua Filler won the inaugural edition, staged in London, defeating Francisco Sánchez Ruiz 13–7 in the final. The 2025 edition of the tournament—its fourth staging—took place from 6 to 11 May 2026 at the Telford International Centre in Telford, England. Robbie Capito was the defending champion, having defeated Mieszko Fortunski 13–10 in the 2024 final.

=== Format ===
A total of 256 players took part in the event, which used a double-elimination format until the last-128 round; it became a single-elimination tournament from the last-64 round onwards. During the double-elimination stage, the matches were played as a race to 8 and 9 racks. From the last-64 round through to the quarter-finals, the matches were played as a race to 10 racks. The semi-finals were played as a race to 11 and the final was a race to 13 racks.

=== Prize fund ===
The winner received $40,000 from a total prize fund of $200,000. The breakdown of prize money is shown below:

- Winner: $40,000
- Runner-up: $16,000
- Semi-finals: $10,000
- Quarter-finals: $7,150
- 9th–16th: $4,000
- 17th–32nd: $2,000
- 33rd–64th: $1,000
- Total: $200,000

== Main draw ==
The results of the main draw, from the last-64 round through to the semi-finals, are shown below.

Last 64; Race to 10 racks
Fitim Haradinaj (KOS)	10
Hsieh Chia-Chen (TWN)	9
Georgi Georgiev (BUL)	10
Sam Henderson (USA)	1
Konrad Juszczyszyn (POL)	9
Liu Ri-Teng (TWN)	10
Jani Uski (FIN)	9
Fraser Patrick (GBR)	10
Pijus Labutis (LIT)	10
Flavian Glont (ROM)	5
Max Lechner (AUT)	10
Wang Hung-hsiang (TWN)	9
Marc Bijsterbosch (NED)	10
Skyler Woodward (USA)	7
Mickey Krause (DEN)	10
David Alcaide (ESP)	8
Jayson Shaw (GBR)	10
Chang Jung-lin (TWN)	6
Lu Hui-Chan (TWN)	10
Kristian Mrva (SVK)	5
Daniel Guttenberger (AUT)	3
Nguyen Anh Tuan (VNM)	10
Lin Ta-Li (TWN)	10
Ramazan Akdag (TUR)	8
Jonás Souto (ESP)	10
Arseni Sevastyanov (FIN)	5
Mario He (AUT)	10
Alex Kazakis (GRE)	6
Daniel Macioł (POL)	10
Mustafa Alnar (TUR)	6
Bader Al-Awadhi (KUW)	8
Mateusz Śniegocki (POL)	10

Last 32; Race to 10 racks
Fitim Haradinaj (KOS)	6
Georgi Georgiev (BUL)	10
Liu Ri-Teng (TWN)	4
Fraser Patrick (GBR)	10
Pijus Labutis (LIT)	10
Max Lechner (AUT)	7
Marc Bijsterbosch (NED)	4
Mickey Krause (DEN)	10
Jayson Shaw (GBR)	10
Lu Hui-Chan (TWN)	7
Nguyen Anh Tuan (VNM)	10
Lin Ta-Li (TWN)	8
Jonás Souto (ESP)	10
Mario He (AUT)	3
Daniel Macioł (POL)	5
Mateusz Śniegocki (POL)	10

Last 16; Race to 10 racks
Georgi Georgiev (BUL)	3
Fraser Patrick (GBR)	10
Pijus Labutis (LIT)	8
Mickey Krause (DEN)	10
Jayson Shaw (GBR)	10
Nguyen Anh Tuan (VNM)	5
Jonás Souto (ESP)	10
Mateusz Śniegocki (POL)	2

Quarter-finals; Race to 10 racks
Fraser Patrick (GBR)	7
Mickey Krause (DEN)	10
Jayson Shaw (GBR)	3
Jonás Souto (ESP)	10

Semi-finals; Race to 11 racks
Mickey Krause (DEN)	5
Jonás Souto (ESP)	11

Last 64; Race to 10 racks
Aloysius Yapp (SGP)	10
Robbie Capito (HKG)	7
Michael Schneider (SUI)	7
Nicholas Tan (SGP)	10
Mohammed Baabad (KSA)	8
Szymon Kural (POL)	10
Carlo Biado (PHL)	10
Mieszko Fortunski (POL)	9
AJ Manas (PHL)	10
Yannick Pongers (NED)	9
Dean Shields (GBR)	8
Dương Quốc Hoàng (VNM)	10
Thorsten Hohmann (GER)	10
Joao Grilo (POR)	7
Salvador García (ESP)	6
Phuong Nam Pham (VNM)	10
Hunter Lombardo (USA)	3
Kledio Kaci (ALB)	10
Aleksa Pecelj (SER)	10
Tang Ching-Ting (TWN)	5
Radosław Babica (POL)	2
Wiktor Zieliński (POL)	10
Lo Ho Sum (HKG)	8
Imran Majid (GBR)	10
Wojciech Szewczyk (POL)	10
Jan van Lierop (NED)	4
Juan Carlos Expósito (ESP)	3
Naoyuki Ōi (JAP)	10
Antonis Brabin (CYP)	6
Tyler Styer (USA)	10
Joshua Filler (GER)	10
Can Salim (GER)	2

Last 32; Race to 10 racks
Aloysius Yapp (SGP)	10
Nicholas Tan (SGP)	5
Szymon Kural (POL)	6
Carlo Biado (PHL)	10
AJ Manas (PHL)	4
Dương Quốc Hoàng (VNM)	10
Thorsten Hohmann (GER)	2
Phuong Nam Pham (VNM)	10
Kledio Kaci (ALB)	8
Aleksa Pecelj (SER)	10
Wiktor Zieliński (POL)	10
Imran Majid (GBR)	1
Wojciech Szewczyk (POL)	5
Naoyuki Ōi (JAP)	10
Tyler Styer (USA)	10
Joshua Filler (GER)	8

Last 16; Race to 10 racks
Aloysius Yapp (SGP)	10
Carlo Biado (PHL)	2
Dương Quốc Hoàng (VNM)	8
Phuong Nam Pham (VNM)	10
Aleksa Pecelj (SER)	8
Wiktor Zieliński (POL)	10
Naoyuki Ōi (JAP)	3
Tyler Styer (USA)	10

Quarter-finals; Race to 10 racks
Aloysius Yapp (SGP)	10
Phuong Nam Pham (VNM)	3
Wiktor Zieliński (POL)	8
Tyler Styer (USA)	10

Semi-finals; Race to 11 racks
Aloysius Yapp (SGP)	11
Wiktor Zieliński (POL)	8
