= 2018 Veldhoven Open =

Tournament information
- Dates: 2–4 August 2018
- Venue: NH Hotel Koningshof,
- City: Veldhoven
- Country: Netherlands
- Organisation: Euro Tour
- Format: Single Elimination, Double elimination
- Total prize fund: €36,000
- Winner's share: €4,500

Final
- Champion: (Austria) Mario He
- Runner-up: (Albania) Eklent Kaçi
- Score: 9–8

The Dynamic Billard Veldhoven Open 2018 (sometimes known as the 2018 Netherlands Open) was the third Euro Tour 9-Ball pool event in 2018. The event was won by Austria's Mario He who defeated Albania's Eklent Kaçi 9–8 in the final. By making the final, Eklent had made the semifinal or better of four straight events.

The previous years champion Ruslan Tschinachow did not reach the last 32 stage.

== Tournament format ==
The event saw a total of 228 players compete, in a double-elimination knockout tournament, until the last 32 stage; where the tournament was contested as single elimination.

=== Prize fund ===
The tournament prize fund was similar to that of other Euro Tour events, with €4,500 for the winner of the event.

	Prize money
Winner	4.500 €
Finalist	€3.000
Semifinalist	€1.750
quarterfinalist	€1.250
last 16	€1.000
Last 32	€500
33–48 Place	€250
Total	€36.000

== Tournament results ==
1st Round
(Switzerland) Dimitri Jungo	9
(Poland) Wiktor Zieliński	5
(Russia) Konstantin Stepanov	9
(Poland) Tomasz Kapłan	7
(Russia) Fedor Gorst	6
(Austria) Mario He	9
(Croatia) Philipp Stojanović	7
(Spain) Iker-Andoni Echeverria	9
(Netherlands) Niels Feijen	9
(Portugal) Bruno Sousa	4
(Austria) Albin Ouschan	9
(Netherlands) Ivar Saris	8
(Portugal) Miguel Silva	9
(Poland) Marek Kudlik	5
(Poland) Mateusz Śniegocki	7
(Russia) Maxim Dudanez	9
(Poland) Konrad Juszczyszyn	8
(Netherlands) Marc Bijsterbosch	9
(Lithuania) Pijus Labutis	7
(Finland) Jani Uski	9
(Greece) Alexander Kazakis	4
(Albania) Eklent Kaçi	9
(Italy) Daniele Corrieri	7
(Spain) Francisco Sánchez	9
(Germany) Ralf Souquet	9
(Hungary) Olivér Szolnoki	7
(Poland) Mariusz Skoneczny	4
(Spain) David Alcaide	9
(Poland) Wojciech Szewczyk	7
(Finland) Kim Laaksonen	9
(Finland) Petri Makkonen	2
(Germany) Joshua Filler	9

2nd Round
(Switzerland) Dimitri Jungo	7
(Russia) Konstantin Stepanov	9
(Austria) Mario He	9
(Spain) Iker-Andoni Echeverria	8
(Netherlands) Niels Feijen	9
(Austria) Albin Ouschan	6
(Portugal) Miguel Silva	6
(Russia) Maxim Dudanez	9
(Netherlands) Marc Bijsterbosch	9
(Finland) Jani Uski	4
(Albania) Eklent Kaçi	9
(Spain) Francisco Sánchez	3
(Germany) Ralf Souquet	6
(Spain) David Alcaide	9
(Finland) Kim Laaksonen	9
(Germany) Joshua Filler	4

Quarterfinals
(Russia) Konstantin Stepanov	7
(Austria) Mario He	9
(Netherlands) Niels Feijen	9
(Russia) Maxim Dudanez	2
(Netherlands) Marc Bijsterbosch	2
(Albania) Eklent Kaçi	9
(Spain) David Alcaide	9
(Finland) Kim Laaksonen	7

Semifinals
(Austria) Mario He	9
(Netherlands) Niels Feijen	1
(Albania) Eklent Kaçi	9
(Spain) David Alcaide	7

Finals
(Austria) Mario He	9
(Albania) Eklent Kaçi	8
