= 2023 Hanoi Open Pool Championship =

Tournament information
- Dates: 10 October–15 October, 2023
- Venue: Hanoi Indoor Games Gymnasium
- City: Hanoi
- Country: Vietnam
- Organisation: Matchroom Pool
- Format: Single Elimination group stage Double Elimination knockout stage
- Participants: 256

Final
- Champion: (Scotland) Jayson Shaw
- Runner-up: (Austria) Albin Ouschan
- Score: 13-12

The 2023 Hanoi Open Pool Championship was the inaugural edition of the Hanoi Open Pool Championship nine-ball pool tournament held from October 10 to 15 2023, at Hanoi, Vietnam.

Jayson Shaw of Scotland won the first tournament by defeating Albin Ouschan from Austria 13-12 in the final.

== Results ==
Results from last 16 to finals.

Last 16
(Spain) Francisco Sánchez Ruiz	5
(Bosnia and Herzegovina) Sanjin Pehlivanović	10
(Philippines) Michael Feliciano	10
(Brunei) Ahmad Taufiq	7
(Scotland) Jayson Shaw	10
(Netherlands) Jan van Lierop	4
(Chinese Taipei) Ko Pin-yi	4
(United States) Fedor Gorst	10
(Philippines) Lee Van Corteza	7
(Spain) David Alcaide	10
(Greece) Alexander Kazakis	6
(Austria) Albin Ouschan	10
(Chinese Taipei) Ko Ping-chung	10
(Austria) Max Lechner	9
(Singapore) Aloysius Yapp	5
(Philippines) Kyle Amoroto	10

Quarterfinals
(Bosnia and Herzegovina) Sanjin Pehlivanović	10
(Philippines) Michael Feliciano	4
(Scotland) Jayson Shaw	10
(United States) Fedor Gorst	8
(Spain) David Alcaide	3
(Austria) Albin Ouschan	10
(Chinese Taipei) Ko Ping-chung	10
(Philippines) Kyle Amoroto	8

Semifinals
(Bosnia and Herzegovina) Sanjin Pehlivanović	2
(Scotland) Jayson Shaw	11
(Austria) Albin Ouschan	11
(Chinese Taipei) Ko Ping-chung	10

Final
(Scotland) Jayson Shaw	13
(Austria) Albin Ouschan	12

== See also ==
- Matchroom Pool
