= 2025 Scottish Open (pool) =

Scottish Open pool championship, held April–May 2025

Tournament information
- Dates: 28 April–4 May 2026
- Venue: McGoldrick's Pool and Sports Bar
- City: Glasgow
- Country: United Kingdom
- Organisation: Matchroom Pool
- Format: Double elimination and single-elimination
- Total prize fund: $53,200
- Winner's share: $12,500

Final
- Champion: Mickey Krause (DEN)
- Runner-up: Aloysius Yapp (SGP)
- Score: 10–3

The 2026 Scottish Open was a nine-ball pool tournament that took place from 28 April to 4 May 2025 at the McGoldrick's Pool and Sports Bar in Glasgow, Scotland. It was the third edition of the Scottish Open, first held in 2023. The winner received $12,500 from a total prize fund of $53,200.

Dương Quốc Hoàng was the defending champion, having defeated Óscar Domínguez 10–8 in the 2024 final. Mickey Krause defeated Aloysius Yapp 10–3 in the final to claim his first Scottish Open title.

== Overview ==
First held in 2023, the Scottish Open is a nine-ball pool tournament. Jayson Shaw won the inaugural edition, defeating Wiktor Zieliński 10–9 in the final. The 2025 edition of the tournament—its third staging—took place from 28 April to 4 May 2025 at the McGoldrick's Pool and Sports Bar in Glasgow, Scotland. Dương Quốc Hoàng was the defending champion, having defeated Óscar Domínguez 10–8 in the 2024 final.

=== Format ===
The event used a double-elimination format until there were 16 players left; it became a single-elimination tournament from the last-16 round onwards. From the last-16 round onwards, the matches were played as a race to 10 racks.

=== Prize fund ===
The winner received $12,500 from a total prize fund of $53,200. The breakdown of prize money is shown below:

- Winner: $12,500
- Runner-up: $6,500
- Semi-finals: $3,500
- Quarter-finals: $2,500
- Last 16: $1,400
- Qualification: $750
- Total: $53,200

== Main draw ==
The results of the main draw, from the last-16 round onwards, are shown below.

Last 16; Race to 10 racks
Eklent Kaçi (ALB)	10
Robbie Capito (HKG)	6
Mickey Krause (DEN)	10
Francisco Sánchez Ruiz (ESP)	2
Carlo Biado (PHL)	6
Kledio Kaci (ALB)	10
Jayson Shaw (GBR)	4
Wiktor Zieliński (POL)	10
Aloysius Yapp (SGP)	10
Riku Romppanen (FIN)	5
Dimitris Loukatos (GRE)	9
Felix Vogel (GER)	10
Pijus Labutis (LIT)	7
Kuo Po-cheng (TAI)	10
John Morra (CAN)	3
Jan van Lierop (NED)	10

Quarter-finals; Race to 10 racks
Eklent Kaçi (ALB)	2
Mickey Krause (DEN)	10
Kledio Kaci (ALB)	5
Wiktor Zieliński (POL)	10
Aloysius Yapp (SGP)	10
Felix Vogel (GER)	1
Kuo Po-cheng (TAI)	7
Jan van Lierop (NED)	10

Semi-finals; Race to 10 racks
Mickey Krause (DEN)	10
Wiktor Zieliński (POL)	7
Aloysius Yapp (SGP)	10
Jan van Lierop (NED)	8

Final; Race to 10 racks
Mickey Krause (DEN)	10
Aloysius Yapp (SGP)	3
