= 2023 World Cup =

2023 World Cup may refer to:

- 2023 FIFA Women's World Cup, in association football
- 2023 FIFA U-20 World Cup, in association football
- 2023 FIFA U-17 World Cup, in association football
- 2023 FIBA Basketball World Cup, in basketball
- 2023 FIBA Under-19 Basketball World Cup, in basketball
- 2023 FIBA Under-19 Women's Basketball World Cup, in basketball
- 2023 Chess World Cup, in chess
- 2023 Cricket World Cup, in cricket
- 2023 ICC Women's T20 World Cup, in cricket
- 2023 Under-19 Women's T20 World Cup, in cricket
- 2023 World Cup of Pool, in cue sports
- 2023 Men's FIH Hockey World Cup, in field hockey
- 2023 Men's FIH Hockey Junior World Cup, in field hockey
- 2023 Women's FIH Hockey Junior World Cup, in field hockey
- 2023 Netball World Cup, in netball
- 2023 Rugby World Cup, in rugby union
- 2023 ISSF World Cup, in shooting
