= 2022 European Open Pool Championship =

Pool tournament in Germany

Tournament information
- Dates: 9-14 August 2022 –
- Venue: Hotel Esperanto Fulda
- City: Fulda
- Country: Germany
- Organisation: Matchroom Pool
- Format: Double elimination
- Total prize fund: $200,000
- Winner's share: $30,000

Final
- Champion: (Austria) Albin Ouschan
- Runner-up: (United States) Shane Van Boening
- Score: 13–11

The 2022 European Open Pool Championship was a nine-ball pool tournament held from 9 to 14 August 2022 in Hotel Esperanto Fulda, Fulda, Germany. It was the inaugural event.

== Tournament format ==
Similar to the 2021 U.S. Open Pool Championship and the 2022 UK Open Pool Championship, it will use a double-elimination bracket, with matches held as a race to 9 racks, until the last 16. There will be four loser rounds, with the first three being a race to 8 and the loser qualification being a race to 9. At that point it will become a single-elimination tournament, as a race to 11 racks. The final will be a race to 13 racks.

== Prize fund ==
The total prize fund is $200,000 with the winner receiving $30,000.

| | Prize money |
|---|---|
| Winner | $30,000 |
| Finalist | $15,000 |
| Semi finalist | $9,500 |
| Quarter finalist | $6,000 |
| Last 16 | $4,000 |
| 17th | $2,000 |
| 33rd | $1,000 |
| 65th | $500 |
| Total | $200,000 |
