= Moritz Neuhausen =

German pool player (born 2003)

Personal information
- Born: 14 November 2003 (age 22) Bonn, Germany

Pool career
- Country: GER

Tournament wins
- Other titles: 2025 Peri Open Nine-ball

Moritz Neuhausen (born 14 November 2003) is a German professional pool player. He was the 2025 Premier League Pool champion. At the 2025 Mosconi Cup, he was awarded most valuable player (MVP) as Europe defeated USA.

== Career ==
In 2021, Neuhausen became European under-19 nine-ball champion, and in 2022, he won the European under-23 nine-ball championship. The following year, he won the Connecticut Open, and finished runner-up at the 2023 World Cup of Pool with playing partner Joshua Filler. The German duo were beaten by Philippines pairing Johann Chua and James Aranas in the final. In November 2023, he was victorious at the 35th Ocean State nine-ball Championship. In 2024, he claimed the Medellin Open title in Mexico City, and later that year he claimed the title at the Turning Stone Classic.

In March 2025, he defeated Francisco Sánchez Ruiz 7‍–‍0 to become the Premier League Pool champion. In October 2025, he claimed a 13‍–‍4 victory over Ko Ping Chung to seal the Peri Open title, and finished runner-up at the Hanoi Open, losing to Pijus Labutis. He then represented Europe at the Reyes Cup; Team Europe suffered defeat to Team Asia. At the end of 2025, he was named to represent Team Europe at the 2025 Mosconi Cup, his debut appearance in the competition. There, he was named Most Valuable Player (MVP), as Europe defeated USA 11‍–‍3.

In March 2026, Neuhausen was victorious at the European Open Nine-ball Championship. He trailed 2‍–‍7 to Mario He but won eleven successive racks to win the trophy.

== Titles & Achievements ==
- 2026 Turning Stone Classic
- 2026 European Open Nine-ball Championship
- 2025 Mosconi Cup MVP
- 2025 Mosconi Cup
- 2025 Peri Open Nine-ball
- 2025 Premier League Pool
- 2024 Turning Stone Classic
- 2024 Medellin Open Nine-ball
- 2023 Ocean State Nine-ball Championship
- 2023 Connecticut Open Nine-ball
- 2022 European Championships under-23 Nine-ball
