= 2021 U.S. Open =

2021 U.S. Open may refer to:

- 2021 U.S. Open (golf), a major golf tournament
- 2021 US Open (tennis), a grand slam tennis tournament
- 2021 U.S. Open Cup, a canceled soccer tournament
- 2021 U.S. Open Pool Championship
