= 2019 World Pool Masters =

Professional 9-Ball Pool event

World Pool Masters XXVI
Tournament information
- Dates: 29–31 March 2019
- Venue: Tercentenary Sports Hall, Victoria Stadium
- City: Gibraltar
- Organisation: Matchroom Sport
- Format: Invitational event
- Total prize fund: $100,000
- Winner's share: $25,000

Final
- Champion: David Alcaide (ESP)
- Runner-up: Alexander Kazakis (GRE)
- Score: 9–8

The 2019 World Pool Masters (Note: also known as World Pool Masters XXVI) was a nine-ball pool tournament which took place in Gibraltar from 29 to 31 March 2019. It was the 26th edition of the World Pool Masters invitational tournament organised by Matchroom Sport. The event contained increased participation from 16 to 24 players, and increased total prize fund to $100,000. Spaniard David Alcaide won the event, defeating Greece's Alexander Kazakis in the final 9–8, doubling the final ball the length of the table to win. The reigning champion was Dutchman Niels Feijen who defeated Shane Van Boening of the United States in the previous year's final to win the title for the second time in his career. Feijen was defeated in the opening round by Alcaide.

== Format ==
The event was played as a single elimination tournament, with players competing in a preliminary round based on rankings. The tournament prize fund was higher than that of previous years, with a total prize fund of $100,000 from $80,000 the year prior. The event winner was awarded $25,000. The total prize money awarded is listed below:

Place	Prize money
Preliminary round	$1,750
Last 16	$2,250
Quarter-finalist	$3,750
Semi-finalist	$7,500
Finalist	$13,000
Winner	$25,000
Total	$100,000

== Tournament summary ==
The 2019 World Masters was organised by Matchroom Sport and contested in the Tercentenary Sports Hall in Victoria Stadium, Gibraltar, as it had since 2017. For 2019, the event saw an increase of eight players to see 24 compete over four rounds, with a preliminary qualification round, having only had 16 players in prior years. The event saw a total prize pool of $100,000 with the winner receiving $25,000. Matches for the event were held as race to 7 racks until the semi-finals, with races to 8 and 9 for semifinals and final respectively. The Masters is the first Matchroom Sport event to be scored by CueScore as part of a multievent deal. As defending champion and two-time champion, Niels Feijen was seeded first and received a bye to the round of 16.

=== Preliminary round ===
The preliminary round took place on 29 March 2019 with eight matches played over two sessions at 3 and 7 p.m. CET. Players competing ranked from 9–24, with the top 8 seeds receiving a bye to the round of 16. Eklent Kaçi defeated the 1997 champion Earl Strickland 7–2; the latter commenting on the room temperature, and crowd reactions for his loss, "It is too cold in here for me ... I am 58 years old and I need warmer conditions", before running down Kaçi saying “The guy is a good player. He is not a great player."

Australian Justin Sajich defeated Finland's Petri Makkonen 7–4. Sajich commented after the match that he was grateful at playing at the event, calling it "dream come true". Matt Edwards defeated Chris Melling 7–3, two players who had never met in competition prior. David Alcaide defeated Francisco Sánchez Ruiz 7–3. Both Alcaide and Ruiz had competed at the 2019 Gibraltar Open snooker event earlier in March, having won two qualifying matches. Ruiz reached the last 64, defeating professional Martin O'Donnell in the first round 4–3, whilst Alcaide lost 4–1 to David Gilbert. Alex Pagulayan defeated China's Wu Jia-qing 7–4. Elsewhere, Shane Van Boening defeated Kelly Fisher 7–2 and Albin Ouschan defeated Jeff de Luna 7–2, and Fedor Gorst defeated Naoyuki Ōi 7–2.

=== Early rounds ===
The last 16 players met in the first round, played over two sessions on 30 March 2019 at 1 and 7 p.m. CET. Defending champion and first seed Niels Feijen was defeated 3–7 by 2017 champion David Alcaide. Two-time winner Shane Van Boening won 7–6 over ladies number 1 Han Yu. Yu took a lead of 6–3, before van Boening won four racks to win the match 7–6. Ko Pin-yi and Alex Pagulayan also went hill-hill, at 6–6, before Pagulayan won the deciding rack to also win 7–6. In the final match of the first session, WPA world number 1 Alexander Kazakis defeated Justin Sajich 7–3.

The second session featured Matt Edwards defeating Konrad Juszczyszyn 7–6. The match saw players share the first six racks, at 3–3, before Juszczysyn took three racks to lead 6–3. Edwards then took the remaining 4 racks to win the match. Albin Ouschan and Joshua Filler also reached 6–6, before 2018 WPA World Nine-ball Championship winner Filler won the deciding rack. In the other first round matches, Skyler Woodward overcame Fedor Gorst, and Eklent Kaçi defeated Jayson Shaw.

The quarter-finals saw the remaining eight players compete, and was played 31 March 2019 at 3 p.m. CET. In the first match, David Alcaide overcame Shane van Boening 7–3. Van Boening took a 3–0 lead, before Alcaide won seven straight racks to win. Eklent Kaçi took an early 6–1 lead over Alex Pagulayan, however, Pagulayan took the next four racks to trail 6–5. In rack 12, Pagulayan missed a bank on the 2-ball, allowing Kaçi to clear to win 7–5.

Third seed Alexander Kazakis faced Matt Edwards. After tying at one-all, Kazakis won the next six racks to win 7–1. The final quarter-final saw Skyler Woodwards defeat Albin Ouschan 7–3, with both players having been previous winners of the MVP at the Mosconi Cup.

=== Finals ===
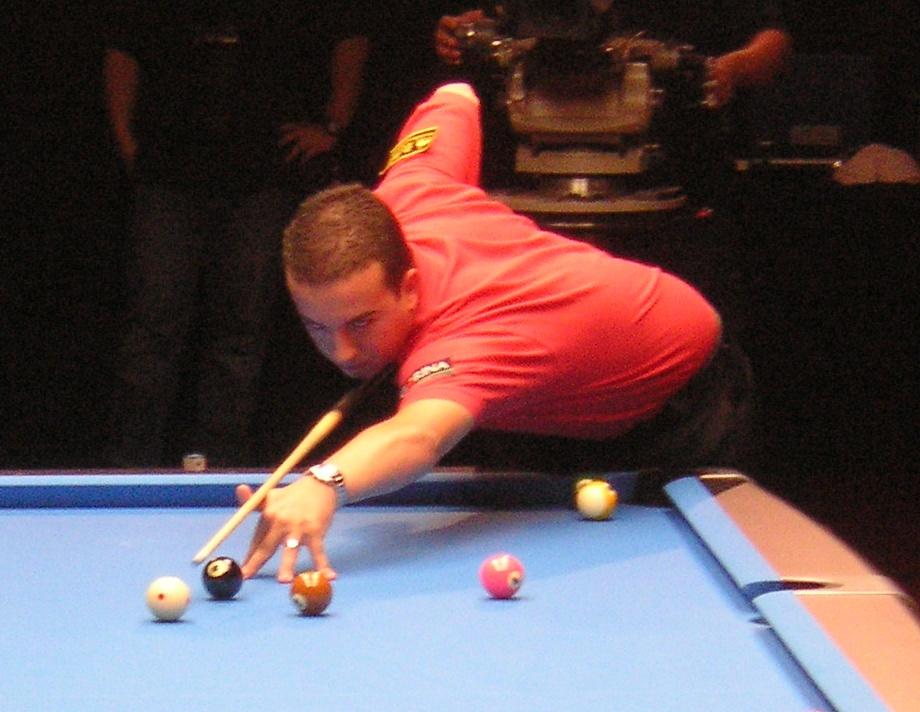
David Alcaide won his second World Pool Masters championship 9–8.

The semi-finals, played as races-to-eight rack matches, were held on 31 March 2019 at 7 p.m. CET, with the final played immediately afterwards. David Alcaide faced Eklant Kaçi in the first semi-final, with Alcaide reaching the final of the event, thanks to a 8–3 win. The second semi-final saw Alexander Kazakis overcome Skyler Woodward 8–1 in a one-sided match.

The final of the event was contested between David Alcaide and Alexander Kazakis, and played as a race to 9 racks match. Kazakis looked in control of the match, winning all five of the opening racks to lead 5–0, and won three of the next eight to be one away from the title at 8–5. Alcaide won the next three racks to come-back and force a final rack, with the scores at 8–8. Alcaide broke in the final rack, but ran out of position on the 5-ball. After Alcaide failed a swerve shot, Kazakis took charge of the table, clearing down to the final ball, where he had left himself in a poor position for the pot. Kazakis decided to play a safety shot over attempting to double the ball to win the match. Despite a good safety, Alcaide banked the 9-ball to win the rack, and tournament. Alcaide won the match and the event, his second Masters title, having also won the event in 2017.

== Main draw ==
The following table denotes the event's draw and results. Numbers to the left of a player's names indicates their seeding, whilst bolding indicates the winner of a match.

Preliminary Round; First to 7 racks
11	David Alcaide (ESP)	7
12	Francisco Sánchez Ruiz (ESP)	3
10	Shane Van Boening (USA)	7
19	Kelly Fisher (ENG)	2
20	Wu Jia-qing (CHN)	4
23	Alex Pagulayan (CAN)	7
9	Eklent Kaçi (ALB)	7
18	Earl Strickland (USA)	2
22	Petri Makkonen (FIN)	4
21	Justin Sajich (AUS)	7
24	Chris Melling (ENG)	3
13	Matt Edwards (NZL)	7
15	Albin Ouschan (AUT)	7
17	Jeff De Luna (PHL)	2
16	Fedor Gorst (RUS)	7
14	Naoyuki Ōi (JPN)	2

Last 16; First to 7 racks
1	Niels Feijen (NED)	3
11	David Alcaide (ESP)	7
8	Han Yu (CHN)	6
10	Shane Van Boening (USA)	7
4	Ko Pin-yi (TPE)	6
23	Alex Pagulayan (CAN)	7
5	Jayson Shaw (SCO)	2
9	Eklent Kaçi (ALB)	7
3	Alexander Kazakis (GRE)	7
21	Justin Sajich (AUS)	3
6	Konrad Juszczyszyn (POL)	6
13	Matt Edwards (NZL)	7
2	Joshua Filler (GER)	6
15	Albin Ouschan (AUT)	7
7	Skyler Woodward (USA)	7
16	Fedor Gorst (RUS)	4

Quarterfinals; First to 7 racks
11	(Spain) David Alcaide	7
10	(United States) Shane Van Boening	3
23	(Canada) Alex Pagulayan	5
9	(Albania) Eklent Kaçi	7
3	(Greece) Alexander Kazakis	7
13	(New Zealand) Matt Edwards	1
15	(Austria) Albin Ouschan	3
7	(United States) Skyler Woodward	7

Semifinals; First to 8 racks
11	(Spain) David Alcaide	8
9	(Albania) Eklent Kaçi	3
3	(Greece) Alexander Kazakis	8
7	(United States) Skyler Woodward	1

Final; First to 9 racks
11	(Spain) David Alcaide	9
3	(Greece) Alexander Kazakis	8
