= Pijus =

- Gender: Male
- Name day: 5 May

Origin
- Origin: from Latin pius
- Meaning: pious
- Region of origin: Lithuania

Pijus is a Lithuanian masculine given name derived from Latin pius, meaning 'pious'. Notable people with the given name include:

- Pijus Labutis (born 1997), Lithuanian pool player.
- Pijus Širvys (born 1998), Lithuanian footballer
