= Hanoi Open Pool Championship =

Annual nine-ball pool tournament

The Hanoi Open Pool Championship is an annual 9-ball pool tournament which takes place in Hanoi, Vietnam. The event was first staged in 2023. Pijus Labutis is the reigning champion.

== Background ==
The competition was introduced by Matchroom Pool in 2023 as a replacement for the Asian Open Pool Championship.

== 2025 Prize fund ==
- Winner: $40,000
- Runner-up: $16,000
- Semi-finals: $10,000
- Quarter-finals: $7,000
- Last 16: $4,000
- Last 32: $2,000
- Last 64: $1,000

== History ==
Finals
Year	Winner	Result	Runner-up	Ref
2023	(Scotland) Jayson Shaw	13‍–‍12	(Austria) Albin Ouschan	
2024	(Philippines) Johann Chua	13‍–‍7	(Chinese Taipei) Ko Pin-yi	
2025	(Lithuania) Pijus Labutis	13‍–‍7	(Germany) Moritz Neuhausen	
