= 2019 U.S. Open Nine-ball Championship =

US Open pool championship, held April 2019

2019 U.S. Open 9-ball Championship
Tournament information
- Dates: 21–26 April 2019
- City: Las Vegas
- Country: United States
- Organisation: Matchroom Pool
- Format: Double elimination

Final
- Champion: (Germany) Joshua Filler
- Runner-up: (China) Wu Jia-qing
- Score: 13-10

The 2019 US Open 9-Ball Championship was an international pool tournament in the discipline 9-Ball, held from 21 to 26 April 2019 in Las Vegas, United States. It was the 43rd entry of the U.S. Open 9-Ball Championships. Germany's Joshua Filler won the event with a 13–10 final victory against Wu Jia-qing to win his first US Open championship.

The defending champion was Jayson Shaw, however Shaw was defeated by Filler in the last 16.

== Tournament format ==
The tournament was played as a double-elimination tournament and as a race to 11 under winner break rules. The event featured a full roster of 256 players.

=== Prize fund ===
The tournament prize fund was a total of $300,000 with the winner receiving $50,000.

	Prize Money
Winner	$50,000
Finalist	$25,000
Semi finalist	$12,000
Quarter finalist	$6,250
9th	$3,500
17th	$2,750
25th	$2,250
33rd	$1,750
49th	$1,500
65th	$1,000
97th	$750
Total	$300,000
