= Matt Edwards (pool player) =

New Zealand pool player

Matthew Edwards
Personal information
- Born: 1987 or 1988 (age 37–38) Auckland, New Zealand

Pool career
- Country: New Zealand
- Pool games: nine-ball, eight-ball, ten-ball
- Highest rank: 37

Matt Edwards (born in Auckland, New Zealand) is a New Zealand player of pool. Edwards is from Kaiapoi, North Canterbury. He started playing Pool at the age of 12.

He is considered New Zealand’s greatest ever pool player, being a record twenty times New Zealand pool champion. In 2019 he became the first ever New Zealander to be invited to play in the 24 player invitational World Pool Masters held in Gibraltar where he made it to the quarter-finals.

== Career ==
Edwards made his World Pool-Billiard Association (WPA) debut in 2012 with the 2012 WPA World Nine-ball Championship the first New Zealander to qualify in the World Championship. At the event, Edwards defeated American Shane Van Boening 9–7 after trailing 1–5. He lost in the last-32 to the eventual winner Darren Appleton 11–10.

In 2016, Edwards competed in the All Japan Championship where he defeated Chang Jung-lin 9–7 who was the WPA world number one at the time. He finished the event in ninth place.

Edwards was the first New Zealander to play in the 2017 World Games. At the championship, held in Poland, he defeated Russia's Ruslan Chinakhov 11–10 in the last-16. He finished 5th place losing to Jayson Shaw in the quarter finals 5–11.

In 2019 Edwards was selected to play in the 2019 World Pool Masters. In the first session Edwards defeated Chris Melling 7–3, the two players had never met in competition prior to this. In the second session Edwards defeated the European Pool Championships nine-ball winner Konrad Juszczyszyn 7–6. The match saw the players share the first six racks, at 3–3, before Juszczysyn took three racks to lead 6–3. Edwards then took the remaining four racks to win the match. He finished fifth place losing to Alexander Kazakis in the quarter-finals.

== Controversy ==
Matthew Edwards was suspected of dishonesty charges in October 2022. Edwards always claimed he was innocent of any wrongdoings. In April 2023 all charges were dropped.

== Titles and Accomplishments ==
- 2023 Oceania 9-Ball Championship
- 2021 New Zealand Pool Championship Nine-ball
- 2021 New Zealand Pool Championship Ten-ball
- 2020 New Zealand Pool Championship Nine-ball
- 2020 New Zealand Pool Championship Eight-ball
- 2019 New Zealand Pool Championship Ten-ball
- 2019 New Zealand Pool Championship Nine-ball
- 2019 New Zealand Pool Championship Eight-ball
- 2018 New Zealand Pool Championship Ten-ball
- 2017 New Zealand Pool Championship Nine-ball
- 2017 New Zealand Pool Championship Ten-ball
- 2016 New Zealand Pool Championship Eight-ball
- 2016 New Zealand Pool Championship Nine-ball
- 2015 New Zealand Pool Championship Eight-ball
- 2015 New Zealand Pool Championship Nine-ball
- 2014 New Zealand Pool Championship Ten-ball
