= 2017 Dutch Open =

Professional pool event, held August 2017

Dynamic Billiard Dutch Open

Tournament information
- Dates: 10–12 August 2017
- Venue: Golden Tulip Jagershorst,
- City: Leende
- Country: Netherlands
- Organisation: Euro Tour
- Format: Single Elimination
- Total prize fund: €36,000
- Winner's share: €4,500

Final
- Champion: (Russia) Ruslan Chinakhov
- Runner-up: (Germany) Christoph Reintjes
- Score: 9-4

The 2017 Dynamic Dutch Open, was the fourth Euro Tour 9-Ball pool event in 2017. The event was won by Russia's Ruslan Chinakhov who defeated Germany's Christoph Reintjes 9–4 in the final.

== Tournament format ==
The event saw a total of 1199 players compete, in a double-elimination knockout tournament, until the last 32 stage; where the tournament was contested as single elimination.

=== Prize fund ===
	Prize money
Winner	4.500 €
Finalist	€3.000
Semifinalist	€1.750
quarterfinalist	€1.250
last 16	€1.000
Last 32	€500
33–48 Place	€250
Total	€36.000

== Tournament results ==
1st Round
(Spain) David Alcaide	7
(Portugal) Joao Grilo	9
(Scotland) Jayson Shaw	9
(Sweden) Daniel Tångudd	6
(Austria) Albin Ouschan	9
(Poland) Mateusz Śniegocki	2
(Russia) Maxim Dudanez	2
(Austria) Maximilian Lechner	9
(Germany) Christoph Reintjes	9
(Slovakia) Jakub Koniar	6
(Kuwait) Abdullah al-Yousef	6
(Poland) Wojciech Szewczyk	9
(Poland) Konrad Juszczyszyn	4
(France) Stephan Cohen	9
(Netherlands) Nick van den Berg	7
(Netherlands) Niels Feijen	9
(Germany) Oliver Ortmann	9
(Russia) Konstantin Stepanov	4
(Greece) Nick Malai	6
(Russia) Fedor Gorst	9
(Poland) Wiktor Zieliński	6
(Russia) Sergei Luzker	9
(Switzerland) Michael Schneider	6
(Spain) Francisco Sánchez	9
(Germany) Ralf Souquet	5
(Spain) Francisco Díaz-Pizarro	9
(Norway) Mats Schjetne	5
(Russia) Ruslan Chinakhov	9
(Netherlands) Marco Teutscher	9
(Poland) Radosław Babica	4
(Sweden) Christian Sparrenlöv	9
(Germany) Mohammad Soufi	7

2nd Round
(Portugal) Joao Grilo	3
(Scotland) Jayson Shaw	9
(Austria) Albin Ouschan	9
(Austria) Maximilian Lechner	6
(Germany) Christoph Reintjes	9
(Poland) Wojciech Szewczyk	5
(France) Stephan Cohen	1
(Netherlands) Niels Feijen	9
(Germany) Oliver Ortmann	9
(Russia) Fedor Gorst	8
(Russia) Sergei Luzker	9
(Spain) Francisco Sánchez	6
(Spain) Francisco Díaz-Pizarro	5
(Russia) Ruslan Chinakhov	9
(Netherlands) Marco Teutscher	9
(Sweden) Christian Sparrenlöv	2

Quarterfinals
(Scotland) Jayson Shaw	7
(Austria) Albin Ouschan	9
(Germany) Christoph Reintjes	9
(Netherlands) Niels Feijen	6
(Germany) Oliver Ortmann	2
(Russia) Sergei Luzker	9
(Russia) Ruslan Chinakhov	9
(Netherlands) Marco Teutscher	8

Semifinals
(Austria) Albin Ouschan	6
(Germany) Christoph Reintjes	9
(Russia) Sergei Luzker	5
(Russia) Ruslan Chinakhov	9

Finals
(Germany) Christoph Reintjes	4
(Russia) Ruslan Chinakhov	9
