= 2025 Mosconi Cup =

Europe v USA Pool Tournament in 2025

- Dates: 3-6 December 2025
- Venue: Alexandra Palace
- Location: London, England
- Captains: Jayson Shaw (EU); Skyler Woodward (US)
- MVP: Moritz Neuhausen
- 11 – 3 Europe retains the Mosconi Cup

The 2025 Mosconi Cup was the 32nd edition of the nine-ball pool tournament. Contested between Team Europe and Team USA, the event took place from 3-6 December at Alexandra Palace in London. Team Europe began the tournament having won 15 of the previous 18 editions. Team Europe defeated Team USA 11‍–‍3 to win their sixth consecutive title in the event. The competition was sponsored by Sportsbet.io.

== Teams ==
Team Europe
Name	Nationality	Notes
David Alcaide	Spain
Joshua Filler	Germany
Jayson Shaw	Scotland	Playing captain
Moritz Neuhausen	Germany	Most Valuable Player
Pijus Labutis	Lithuania

Team USA
Name	State of birth	Notes
Fedor Gorst
Skyler Woodward	Kentucky	Playing captain
Billy Thorpe
Tyler Styer	Wisconsin
Shane Van Boening	South Dakota

== Day one results ==
	Result	
Team Europe	5‍–‍1	Team USA
Joshua Filler/David Alcaide	5‍–‍3	Fedor Gorst/Shane van Boening
Jayson Shaw	5‍–‍2	Skyler Woodward
Moritz Neuhausen/Pijus Labutis	5‍–‍2	Tyler Styer/Billy Thorpe

== Day two results ==
	Result	
Team Europe	5‍–‍4	Team USA
Joshua Filler	5‍–‍3	Fedor Gorst
Joshua Filler/Jayson Shaw	2‍–‍5	Shane van Boening/Skyler Woodward

== Day three results ==
	Result	
Moritz Neuhausen	5‍–‍4	Tyler Styer
David Alcaide/Pijus Labutis	3‍–‍5	Fedor Gorst/Billy Thorpe
Team Europe	5‍–‍4	Team USA
David Alcaide	3‍–‍5	Shane van Boening

== Day four results ==
	Result	
Joshua Filler/Moritz Neuhausen	5‍–‍2	Fedor Gorst/Skyler Woodward
Pijus Labutis	5‍–‍3	Billy Thorpe
Jayson Shaw/David Alcaide	5‍–‍2	Shane van Boening/Tyler Styer
