= Christoph Reintjes =

German pool player

Pool career
- Pool games: 9-Ball
- Best finish: Runner-up 2017 Dutch Open

Christoph Reintjes is a German professional pool player. He is best well known for being the runner-up at the 2017 Dutch Open.

== Career ==
Reintjes first competed in Euro Tour events in 2007, where he reached the last 32 in his first professional competition, at the 2007 German Open. He played Tony Drago, but lost 9–10. He entered three competitions in 2007, but only made the knockout round on this occasion.

In 2008, he once again reached the knockout rounds of Euro Tour events, at the Swiss and Austrian Opens, losing to Marcus Chamat 8–9, and Bruno Muratore 5–9. A year later, Reintjes went further at the 2009 French Open. He defeated Imran Majid 9–8 in the last 32, before losing to Mark Gray 9–3 in the last 16.

Following 2009, Reintjes took a sabbatical from pool, only playing in the 2011 Hungary Open before 2017. In 2017, he played in the 2017 Leende Open. Reintjes defeated Murat Teker 9–8, John Abiven 9–1, Tomasz Kapłan 9-8 and Nick van den Berg 9–3 to reach the knockout rounds. In the last 32, Reintjes defeated Jakub Koniar 9–6, before defeating former winner Wojciech Szewczyk 9–5 in the last 16. Reintjes then defeated Niels Feijen 9–6 in the quarterfinals, and Albin Ouschan 9–6 to reach the final of the event. In the final, he competed against Russia's Ruslan Chinakhov and, despite having a 4–2 lead, eventually lost 4–9.

== Titles ==
- 2021 World Cup of Pool - with (Joshua Filler)
- 2018 German Pool Championship 14.1
- 2017 German Pool Championship 9-Ball
