= Kyle Amoroto =

Filipino pool player

Personal information
- Nickname: The Sharp Shooter
- Born: 2002 (age 23–24)

Pool career
- Country: Philippines

Tournament wins
- Major: 2025 All Japan Championship

Kyle "Sharp Shooter" Amoroto is a Filipino pool player from the Philippines. He won the 2022 Philippine Ten-ball Open besting a massive field of over 400 players. He defeated Paul John Ladao in the tournament. He won the 2025 All Japan Championship beating compatriot Johann Chua 11–5 in the finals.

== Titles ==
- 2026 Formosa Cup International Open Nine-ball
- 2026 Peri Laili Cup Nine-ball Championship
- 2025 No Mercy Cup WTA
- 2025 Taytay Nine-ball Open
- 2025 All Japan Championship Ten-ball
- 2025 Bandung Open Nine-ball Championship
- 2025 Banjarmasin Nine-ball Open
- 2025 J.Flowers Nine-ball International Open
- 2025 Gardu Ten-ball International Open
- 2025 CSMI Nine-ball Championship
- 2022 Philippine Ten-ball Open
