= 2022 UK Open Pool Championship =

UK Open pool championship, held May 2022

Tournament information
- Dates: May 17–22, 2022
- Venue: Copper Box Arena
- City: London
- Country: United Kingdom
- Organisation: Matchroom Pool
- Format: Double elimination
- Total prize fund: $200,000
- Winner's share: $30,000

Final
- Champion: Joshua Filler
- Runner-up: Francisco Sánchez Ruiz
- Score: 13-7

The 2022 U.K. Open Pool Championship was the inaugural international nine-ball pool tournament held from 17 to 22 May 2022 at the Copper Box Arena in London.

== Tournament format ==
Similar to the 2021 U.S. Open Pool Championship and the 2022 European Open Pool Championship, the tournament uses a double-elimination bracket with matches held as a race to 9 racks, until the last 16. Then, it would become single-elimination tournament race to 11 racks. The final is race to 13 racks

== Prize fund ==
The total prize fund is $200,000 with the winner receiving $30,000.

	Prize money
Winner	$30,000
Finalist	$15,000
Semi finalist	$7,500
Quarter finalist	$5,500
Last 16	$3,700
17th	$2,000
25th	$1,500
33rd	$1,250
49th	$1,000
65th	$500
97th	$250
Total	$200,000
