= 2021 U.S. Open Pool Championship =

US Open pool championship, held April 2021

Tournament information
- Dates: September 13–18, 2021
- Venue: Harrah’s Resort
- City: Atlantic City, New Jersey
- Country: United States
- Organisation: Matchroom Pool
- Format: Double elimination
- Total prize fund: $300,000
- Winner's share: $50,000

Final
- Champion: (Philippines) Carlo Biado
- Runner-up: (Singapore) Aloysius Yapp
- Score: 13–8

The 2021 U.S. Open Pool Championship (previously U.S. Open 9-Ball Championship) was an international nine-ball pool tournament held from 13 to 18 September 2021 in Harrah’s Resort, Atlantic City, New Jersey. It was the 44th entry of the U.S. Open 9-Ball Championships, first held in 1976. Joshua Filler was the defending champion, having won the 2019 U.S. Open Nine-ball Championship. However, Filler lost 4–11 to Aloysius Yapp and 3–11 to Mieszko Fortuński, eliminating him from the tournament. Carlo Biado defeated Yapp 13–8 in the final to become one of the few Filipino players to win the tournament along with Alex Pagulayan in 2005 and Efren Reyes in 1994.

== Tournament format ==
The U.S. Open Pool Championship is a nine-ball pool tournament first held in 1976, won by Mike Sigel. It is pool's longest running major title. The 2021 tournament was played at Harrah’s Resort in Atlantic City from September 13–18, 2021. It used a double-elimination bracket, with matches held as a race to 9 racks, until the last 16. At that point it became a single-elimination tournament, as a race to 11 racks. The final was a race to 13 racks. Joshua Filler was the defending champion, having won the 2019 event, with the 2020 event having been cancelled due to the COVID-19 pandemic. Organized by Matchroom Sport, the event featured 256 participants playing on 33 tables, with entries to the event costing $750. The tournament was filled within 10 hours of signups opening. The event was broadcast on DAZN in the US and Canada as well as Germany, Spain and Italy; Sky Sports in the UK & Ireland; Viaplay in Scandinavia, Baltic Nations and Iceland); Zhibo.tv in China; and SuperSports in South Africa and Sub Saharan Africa.

=== Prize fund ===
The tournament prize fund was a total of $300,000 with the winner receiving $50,000.

	Prize money
Winner	$50,000
Finalist	$25,000
Semi finalist	$12,000
Quarter finalist	$6,250
9th	$3,500
17th	$2,750
25th	$2,250
33rd	$1,750
49th	$1,500
65th	$1,000
97th	$750
Total	$300,000

== Summary ==
The double-elimination round was played from 13 to 17 September. The 2019 World Snooker Championship winner Judd Trump competed in his first pool event. He completed a 9–0 whitewash over Joe Magee in his first competitive match, followed by victories over Dhurav Patel 9–2 and Abdullah Al-Shammari 11–5. In the winners' third round, Trump met 2017 U.S. Open Pool Championship winner Jayson Shaw, who had defeated Hsieh Chia Chen in the prior round 11–10. Shaw fluked the opening rack, and won ten of the next eleven to win 11–1. Trump then lost 10–11 to Jason Theron in the losers' bracket to exit the tournament.

Defending champion Filler defeated Joseph Blyler 9–2, with his opponent applauding some of Filler's shots. Filler was then tied at 8–8 with Sanjin Pehlivanović, with his opponent missing a six-ball, allowing Filler to win the next three racks. However, Filler lost his third winners' round match to Aloysius Yapp 11–3.

The 2021 WPA World Nine-ball Championship winner Albin Ouschan completed a whitewash over Scott Haas on the first day, and progressed to the winners' qualifying round against Alexander Kazakis. Five-time winner Earl Strickland completed a 9–1 victory over Adam Martin, but lost to Alan Rosado in the losers bracket.

== Main draw ==
=== Winners section ===
==== Section 1 ====
Round 1 First to 9 racks
(Germany) Joshua Filler (1)	9
(United States) Joseph Blyler	2
(Iraq) Shamel Alazzawi	3
(United States) Thomas Hass	9
(Bosnia and Herzegovina) Sanjin Pehlivanovic	9
(United States) Evan Lunda	3
(United States) Ilija Trajceski	0
(South Africa) Muhammed Daydat	9
(Poland) Wojciech Szewczyk	9
(United States) Kashton Keeton	3
(United States) Chad Bazinet	1
(United States) Abrin Schaad	9
(Puerto Rico) Reinaldo Dendariarena	9
(Peru) Guillermo Beramendi	5
(United States) Devin Poteet	5
(Singapore) Aloysius Yapp (32)	9
(Kuwait) Omar Al Shaheen (17)	9
(United States) James Prather	2
(United States) Ellis Brown	6
(United States) Suad Kantarevic	9
(Lebanon) Mohammad Ali Berjaoui	9
(United States) Steve Lillis	1
(United States) Barry West Jr	3
(Denmark) Bahram Lotfy	9
(Spain) Jonas Souto Comino	9
(United States) Christopher Cameron	0
(United States) Carlin Sanderson	3
(Denmark) Mickey Krause	9
(United States) Ziad Thweib	4
(United States) Chalmer Vergara	9
(United States) Raymond Linares	8
(United States) Billy Thorpe (16)	9

Round 2 First to 9 racks
(Germany) Joshua Filler (1)	9
(United States) Thomas Haas	2
(Bosnia and Herzegovina) Sanjin Pehlivanovic	9
(South Africa) Muhummed Daydat	3
(Poland) Wojciech Szewczyk	9
(United States) Abrin Schaad	8
(Puerto Rico) Reinaldo Dendariarena	1
(Singapore) Aloysius Yapp (32)	9
(Kuwait) Omar Al Shaheen (17)	6
(United States) Suad Kantarevic	9
(Lebanon) Mohammad Ali Berjaoui	2
(Denmark) Bahram Lotfy	9
(Spain) Jonas Souto Comino	7
(Denmark) Mickey Krause	9
(United States) Chalmer Vergara	6
(United States) Billy Thorpe (16)	9

Round 3 First to 11 racks
(Germany) Joshua Filler (1)	11
(Bosnia and Herzegovina) Sanjin Pehlivanovic	8
(Poland) Wojciech Szewczyk	10
(Singapore) Aloysius Yapp (32)	11
(United States) Suad Kantarevic	3
(Denmark) Bahram Lotfy	11
(Denmark) Mickey Krause	11
(United States) Billy Thorpe (16)	10

Round 4 First to 11 racks
(Germany) Joshua Filler (1)	4
(Singapore) Aloysius Yapp (32)	11
(Denmark) Bahram Lotfy	9
(Denmark) Mickey Krause	11

Round 5 First to 11 racks
(Singapore) Aloysius Yapp (32)	11
(Denmark) Mickey Krause	3

==== Section 2 ====
Round 1 First to 9 racks
(Japan) Naoyuki Oi (9)	9
(United States) David Daya	4
(United States) Cody Myers	5
(Kuwait) Mohammad Almuhanna	9
(Philippines) Roland Garcia	9
(United States) Nic Torraca	2
(United States) Vincent Cimarelli	4
(Poland) Konrad Juszczyszyn	9
(Poland) Mateusz Sniegocki	9
(United States) Jeremiah Stanfield	0
(United States) Josh Burbul	9
(United States) Shane Wolford	7
(United States) Nickolas Carson	9
(United States) Gary Urinoski	5
(United States) Tony Robles	6
(Estonia) Denis Grabe (24)	9
(United Kingdom) Judd Trump (25)	9
(United States) Joe Magee	0
(India) Dhruvalkumar Patel	9
(United States) Michael Sclafani	5
(Saudi Arabia) Abdullah Al-Shammari	9
(United States) Coen Bell	4
(United States) Steve Craney	w/o
(United Kingdom) Karl Boyes	w/d
(Chinese Taipei) Hsieh Chia Chen	9
(Honduras) Elvis Rodriguez	5
(Italy) Massimillano Corso	3
(United States) Josh Roberts	9
(Philippines) Daniel Dagotdot	9
(India) Jaydev Zaveri	7
(Costa Rica) Esteban Robles	3
(United Kingdom) Jayson Shaw (8)	9

Round 2 First to 9 racks
(Japan) Naoyuki Oi (9)	9
(Kuwait) Mohammad Almuhanna	3
(Philippines) Roland Garcia	9
(Poland) Konrad Juszczyszyn	6
(Poland) Mateusz Sniegocki	9
(United States) Josh Burbul	4
(United States) Nickolas Carson	5
(Estonia) Denis Grabe (24)	9
(United Kingdom) Judd Trump (25)	9
(India) Dhruvalkumar Patel	2
(Saudi Arabia) Abdullah Al-Shammari	9
(United States) Steve Craney	1
(Chinese Taipei) Hsieh Chia Chen	9
(United States) Josh Roberts	8
(Philippines) Daniel Dagotdot	0
(United Kingdom) Jayson Shaw (8)	9

Round 3 First to 11 racks
(Japan) Naoyuki Oi (9)	11
(Philippines) Roland Garcia	8
(Poland) Mateusz Sniegocki	6
(Estonia) Denis Grabe (24)	11
(United Kingdom) Judd Trump (25)	11
(Saudi Arabia) Abdullah Al-Shammari	5
(Chinese Taipei) Hsieh Chia Chen	10
(United Kingdom) Jayson Shaw (8)	11

Round 4 First to 11 racks
(Japan) Naoyuki Oi (9)	4
(Estonia) Denis Grabe (24)	11
(United Kingdom) Judd Trump (25)	1
(United Kingdom) Jayson Shaw (8)	11

Round 5 First to 11 racks
(Estonia) Denis Grabe (24)	11
(United Kingdom) Jayson Shaw (8)	9

==== Section 3 ====
Round 1 First to 9 racks
(Austria) Max Lechner (5)	9
(United States) Osiris Crawford	1
Bye
(United States) Max Watanabe	w/o
(United States) Brandon Shuff	9
(United States) Michael Hunter	3
(United States) John Moody Jr	6
(Switzerland) Daniel Schneider	9
(Netherlands) Marco Teutscher	9
(United States) Kevin Clark	0
(United States) Daniel Klochenok	6
(Germany) Pia Filler	9
(United States) Greg Antonakos	6
(United States) Anthony Conn	9
(United States) Kyle Coleman	0
(United States) Chris Reinhold (28)	9
(Canada) Alex Pagulayan (21)	9
(United States) Gary Serrano	1
(United States) Blake Baker	9
(United States) Mason Koch	7
(Singapore) Toh Lian Han	9
(United States) Tyler Blowers	7
(United States) Wilfredo D Albay Jr	0
(Chinese Taipei) Wu Kun Lin	9
(Philippines) Jeffrey De Luna	9
(United States) Edward Abraham	5
(United States) Bill Meacham	9
(United States) Allen Hopkins	2
(Philippines) Rodrigo Geronimo	9
(United States) James Conn	1
(Kuwait) Hussain Al Sayyafi	9
(United States) Tyler Styer (12)	7

Round 2 First to 9 racks
(Austria) Max Lechner (5)	9
(United States) Max Watanabe	0
(United States) Brandon Shuff	3
(Switzerland) Daniel Schneider	9
(Netherlands) Marco Teutscher	9
(Germany) Pia Filler	3
(United States) Anthony Conn	7
(United States) Chris Reinhold (28)	9
(Canada) Alex Pagulayan (21)	9
(United States) Blake Baker	2
(Singapore) Toh Lian Han	9
(Chinese Taipei) Wu Kun Lin	5
(Philippines) Jeffrey De Luna	9
(United States) Bill Meacham	2
(Philippines) Rodrigo Geronimo	9
(Kuwait) Hussain Al Sayyafi	5

Round 3 First to 11 racks
(Austria) Max Lechner (5)	11
(Switzerland) Daniel Schneider	3
(Netherlands) Marco Teutscher	11
(United States) Chris Reinhold (28)	4
(Canada) Alex Pagulayan (21)	8
(Singapore) Toh Lian Han	11
(Philippines) Jeffrey De Luna	10
(Philippines) Rodrigo Geronimo	11

Round 4 First to 11 racks
(Austria) Max Lechner (5)	11
(Netherlands) Marco Teutscher	7
(Singapore) Toh Lian Han	2
(Philippines) Rodrigo Geronimo	11

Round 5 First to 11 racks
(Austria) Max Lechner (5)	11
(Philippines) Rodrigo Geronimo	2

==== Section 4 ====
Round 1 First to 9 racks
(Chinese Taipei) Chang Jung-Lin (13)	9
(Canada) Waleed Hashem	3
(United States) Raed Shabib	9
(Republic of Ireland) Karen Corr	5
(United States) Shaun Wilkie	9
(United States) Matt Krah	7
(United States) Tyler Adolini	6
(Philippines) Jeffrey Ignacio	9
(Canada) John Morra	9
(United States) Kang Lee	2
(Philippines) Dan Segui	1
(United States) Donny Mills	9
Bye
(United States) Joseph Korsiak	w/o
(Canada) Brad Guthrie	0
(Hungary) Olivér Szolnoki (20)	9
(Philippines) Dennis Orcollo (29)	8
(Honduras) Miguel Angel Giron Mendieta	9
(United States) Daniel Sharlow	7
(United States) Paul Spaanstra	9
(United States) Pedro Botta	9
(United States) April Larson	5
(Puerto Rico) Juan Jose Rosa	3
(United States) Corey Deuel	9
(Croatia) Ivica Putnik	w/o
Bye
(United States) Adam Martin	1
(United States) Earl Strickland	9
(United States) Kyle Bova	9
(United States) Jennifer Barretta	3
Bye
(Greece) Alex Kazakis (4)	w/o

Round 2 First to 9 racks
(Chinese Taipei) Chang Jung-Lin (13)	9
(United States) Raed Shabib	5
(United States) Shaun Wilkie	4
(Philippines) Jeffrey Ignacio	9
(Canada) John Morra	9
(United States) Donny Mills	4
(United States) Joseph Korsiak	6
(Hungary) Olivér Szolnoki (20)	9
(Philippines) Dennis Orcollo (29)	9
(United States) Paul Spaanstra	2
(United States) Pedro Botta	4
(United States) Corey Deuel	9
(Croatia) Ivica Putnik	9
(United States) Earl Strickland	3
(United States) Kyle Bova	5
(Greece) Alex Kazakis (4)	9

Round 3 First to 11 racks
(Chinese Taipei) Chang Jung-Lin (13)	11
(Philippines) Jeffrey Ignacio	8
(Canada) John Morra	7
(Hungary) Olivér Szolnoki (20)	11
(Philippines) Dennis Orcollo (29)	11
(United States) Corey Deuel	1
(Croatia) Ivica Putnik	6
(Greece) Alex Kazakis (4)	11

Round 4 First to 11 racks
(Chinese Taipei) Chang Jung-Lin (13)	9
(Hungary) Olivér Szolnoki	11
(Philippines) Dennis Orcollo (29)	11
(Greece) Alex Kazakis (4)	3

Round 5 First to 11 racks
(Hungary) Olivér Szolnoki (20)	6
(Philippines) Dennis Orcollo (29)	11

==== Section 5 ====
Round 1 First to 9 racks
(Austria) Albin Ouschan (3)	9
(United States) Scott Haas	0
Bye
(Switzerland) Michael Schneider	w/o
(Poland) Wiktor Zieliński	9
(United States) Christopher Pyle	0
(India) Virat Agrawal	4
(United States) Marc Vidal Claramunt	9
(Poland) Mieszko Fortuński	9
(Serbia) Dalibor Nikolin	4
(Canada) Stephen Folan	9
(Saudi Arabia) Khalid Alghamdi	7
(United States) Nick Antonakos	9
(United States) Tony Rudi	6
(United States) Thomas Dalfonso	6
(Germany) Thorsten Hohmann (30)	9
(Philippines) Johann Chua (19)	9
(United States) Steven Way	1
(United States) Kelson Juan	9
(United States) Utpal Raval	6
(United States) Christopher Lawson	w/o
Bye
(United States) Chad Fairchild	w/o
(Russia) Ruslan Chinahov	w/d
(Lithuania) Pijus Labutis	9
(Honduras) Henry Rivera Portillo	2
(United States) Hunter Sullivan	2
(New Zealand) Sullivan Clark	9
(United States) John Hennigan	9
(United States) Steve Kotuba	0
(Japan) Sakura Muramatsu	1
(Philippines) James Aranas (14)	9

Round 2 First to 9 racks
(Austria) Albin Ouschan (3)	9
(Switzerland) Michael Schneider	3
(Poland) Wiktor Zieliński	9
(United States) Marc Vidal Claramunt	5
(Poland) Mieszko Fortuński	9
(Canada) Stephen Folan	5
(United States) Nick Antonakos	1
(Germany) Thorsten Hohmann (30)	9
(Philippines) Johann Chua (19)	9
(United States) Kelson Juan	2
(United States) Christopher Lawson	9
(United States) Chad Fairchild	5
(Lithuania) Pijus Labutis	9
(New Zealand) Sullivan Clark	4
(United States) John Hennigan	4
(Philippines) James Aranas (14)	9

Round 3 First to 11 racks
(Austria) Albin Ouschan (3)	5
(Poland) Wiktor Zieliński	11
(Poland) Mieszko Fortuński	11
(Germany) Thorsten Hohmann (30)	5
(Philippines) Johann Chua (19)	11
(United States) Christopher Lawson	5
(Lithuania) Pijus Labutis	11
(Philippines) James Aranas (14)	9

Round 4 First to 11 racks
(Poland) Wiktor Zieliński	10
(Poland) Mieszko Fortuński	11
(Philippines) Johann Chua (19)	11
(Lithuania) Pijus Labutis	6

Round 5 First to 11 racks
(Poland) Mieszko Fortuński	7
(Philippines) Johann Chua (19)	11

==== Section 6 ====
Round 1 First to 9 racks
(Germany) Ralf Souquet (11)	9
(United States) Randolph LaBonte	5
(Kuwait) Aldullah Alyousef	w/d
(United States) Keith Guenzel	w/o
(United States) Jeremy Jones	7
(United States) Demetrius Jelatis	9
(United States) Mike Salerno	3
(Qatar) Waleed Majid	9
(United States) Hunter Lombardo	9
(United States) Kevin West	5
(Pakistan) Shahram Changezi	9
(United States) Rob Hart	7
(United States) James Davee	3
(Albania) Shpendi Kaba	9
(Yemen) Ali Dhaifallah Abdullah Almuhtadi	w/d
(Netherlands) Marc Bijsterbosch (22)	w/o
(Philippines) Carlo Biado (27)	9
(United States) Steve Fleming	2
(United States) Michael Toohig	2
(Canada) Vincent Beaurivage	9
(United States) Michael Yednak	9
(United States) Deepak Dhiman	3
(United States) Nathan Childress	2
(Finland) Mika Immonen	9
(Kuwait) Badar Alawadhi	9
(United States) Hendrik Drost	0
(Spain) José Alberto Delgado	9
(United States) Danny Olson	7
(Dominican Republic) Reyes Gomez	9
(United States) John Francisco	3
(United States) Fred Upham	0
(Spain) David Alcaide (6)	9

Round 2 First to 9 racks
(Germany) Ralf Souquet (11)	9
(United States) Keith Guenzel	2
(United States) Demetrius Jelatis	9
(Qatar) Waleed Majid	7
(United States) Hunter Lombardo	7
(Pakistan) Shahram Changezi	9
(Albania) Shpendi Kaba	1
(Netherlands) Marc Bijsterbosch (22)	9
(Philippines) Carlo Biado (27)	9
(Canada) Vincent Beaurivage	3
(United States) Michael Yednak	7
(Finland) Mika Immonen	9
(Kuwait) Badar Alawadhi	8
(Spain) José Alberto Delgado	9
(Dominican Republic) Reyes Gomez	1
(Spain) David Alcaide (6)	9

Round 3 First to 11 racks
(Germany) Ralf Souquet (11)	11
(United States) Demetrius Jelatis	8
(Pakistan) Shahram Changezi	5
(Netherlands) Marc Bijsterbosch (22)	11
(Philippines) Carlo Biado (27)	11
(Finland) Mika Immonen	1
(Spain) José Alberto Delgado	6
(Spain) David Alcaide (6)	11

Round 4 First to 11 racks
(Germany) Ralf Souquet (11)	4
(Netherlands) Marc Bijsterbosch (22)	11
(Philippines) Carlo Biado (27)	5
(Spain) David Alcaide (6)	11

Round 5 First to 11 racks
(Netherlands) Marc Bijsterbosch (22)	8
(Spain) David Alcaide (6)	11

==== Section 7 ====
Round 1 First to 9 racks
(Albania) Eklent Kaçi (7)	9
(Venezuela) Jesus Atencio	7
(United States) Dawn Hopkins	3
(United States) Austin Summers	9
(South Africa) Jason Theron	9
(United States) Sampson Yonko	1
(United States) Robert Frost	7
(Poland) Radoslaw Babica	9
(Japan) Masato Yoshioka	9
(United States) Edward Epperson	1
(United States) Kurt Kobayashi	7
(United States) Blaine Barcus	9
(United States) Albrecht Lapena	4
(United States) Adam King	9
(United States) Jonathan L. Smith	6
(United Kingdom) Darren Appleton (26)	9
(Russia) Fedor Gorst (23)	9
(United States) Kevin Zock	0
(United States) John Moody Sr	9
(Puerto Rico) Michael Ortiz	2
(United States) Lukas Fracasso-Verner	9
(United States) Anthony Manning	0
(United States) Joseph Testa	7
(Philippines) Roberto Gomez	9
(United Kingdom) Kelly Fisher	9
(United States) Leo Ott	3
(United States) Kevin Guimond	5
(Russia) Kristina Tkach	9
Bye
(Japan) Kenshiro Sakai	w/o
(United States) Mike Saleh	2
(Netherlands) Niels Feijen (10)	9

Round 2 First to 9 racks
(Albania) Eklent Kaçi (7)	9
(United States) Austin Summers	3
(South Africa) Jason Theron	9
(Poland) Radoslaw Babica	7
(Japan) Masato Yoshioka	6
(United States) Blaine Barcus	9
(United States) Adam King
(United Kingdom) Darren Appleton (26)	9
(Russia) Fedor Gorst (23)	9
(United States) John Moody Sr	1
(United States) Lukas Fracasso-Verner	5
(Philippines) Roberto Gomez	9
(United Kingdom) Kelly Fisher	9
(Russia) Kristina Tkach	4
(Japan) Kenshiro Sakai	6
(Netherlands) Niels Feijen (10)	9

Round 3 First to 11 racks
(Albania) Eklent Kaçi (7)	11
(South Africa) Jason Theron	2
(United States) Blaine Barcus	7
(United Kingdom) Darren Appleton (26)	11
(Russia) Fedor Gorst (23)	11
(Philippines) Roberto Gomez	6
(United Kingdom) Kelly Fisher	8
(Netherlands) Niels Feijen (10)	11

Round 4 First to 11 racks
(Albania) Eklent Kaçi (7)	6
(United Kingdom) Darren Appleton (26)	11
(Russia) Fedor Gorst (23)	11
(Netherlands) Niels Feijen (10)	1

Round 5 First to 11 racks
(United Kingdom) Darren Appleton (26)	7
(Russia) Fedor Gorst (23)	11

==== Section 8 ====
Round 1 First to 9 racks
(United States) Skyler Woodward (15)	9
(United States) Rick Miller	2
(United States) Douglas Jones	2
(United States) Joey Tate	9
Bye
(United States) Michael Mathieu	w/o
(United States) Bill Smith	3
(Austria) Mario He	9
Bye
(United States) Justin Espinosa	w/o
(United States) Michael DeLawder	3
(Philippines) Warren Kiamco	9
(Norway) Emil André Gangfløt	9
(United States) David Shlemperis	4
(United States) Nathan Wallace	0
(Spain) Francisco Sanchez Ruiz (18)	9
(Poland) Tomasz Kaplan (31)	9
(Canada) Erik Hjorleifson	3
(Puerto Rico) Alan Rolon Rosado	9
(United States) Rick Scarlato Jr	7
(United States) Justin Martin	9
(United States) William Hammond	0
(United States) BJ Ussery	w/o
Bye
(Germany) Moritz Neuhausen	w/o
Bye
(United States) Anthony Meglino	w/o
(Canada) Stephen Holem	w/d
(Singapore) Sharik Sayed	9
(United States) Nicholas Coppola	7
(Italy) Francesco Candela	2
(United States) Shane Van Boening (2)	9

Round 2 First to 9 racks
(United States) Skyler Woodward (15)	9
(United States) Joey Tate	3
(United States) Michael Mathieu	4
(Austria) Mario He	9
(United States) Justin Espinosa	7
(Philippines) Warren Kiamco	9
(Norway) Emil André Gangfløt	0
(Spain) Francisco Sanchez Ruiz (18)	9
(Poland) Tomasz Kaplan (31)	7
(Puerto Rico) Alan Rolon Rosado	9
(United States) Justin Martin	8
(United States) BJ Ussery	9
(Germany) Mortiz Neuhausen	9
(United States) Anthony Meglino	7
(Singapore) Sharik Sayed	6
(United States) Shane Van Boening (2)	9

Round 3 First to 11 racks
(United States) Skyler Woodward (15)	9
(Austria) Mario He	11
(Philippines) Warren Kiamco	6
(Spain) Francisco Sanchez Ruiz (18)	11
(Puerto Rico) Alan Rolon Rosado	6
(United States) BJ Ussery	11
(Germany) Moritz Neuhausen	3
(United States) Shane Van Boening (2)	11

Round 4 First to 11 racks
(Austria) Mario He	7
(Spain) Francisco Sanchez Ruiz (18)	11
(United States) BJ Ussery	3
(United States) Shane Van Boening (2)	11

Round 5 First to 11 racks
(Spain) Francisco Sanchez Ruiz (18)	11
(United States) Shane Van Boening (2)	6

=== Losers section ===
==== Rounds 1–4 ====
Round 1 First to 9 racks
(United States) Joseph Blyler	7
(Iraq) Shamel Alazzawi	9
(United States) Evan Lunda	9
(United States) Ilija Trajceski	7
(United States) Kashton Keeton	1
(United States) Chad Bazinet	9
(Peru) Guillermo Beramendi	3
(United States) Devin Poteet	9
(United States) James Prather	6
(United States) Ellis Brown	9
(United States) Steve Lillis	9
(United States) Barry West Jr	6
(United States) Christopher Cameron	0
(United States) Carlin Sanderson	9
(United States) Ziad Thweib	1
(United States) Raymond Linares	9
(United States) David Daya	9
(United States) Cody Myers	7
(United States) Nic Torraca	5
(United States) Vincent Cimarelli	9
(United States) Jeremiah Stanfield	2
(United States) Shane Wolford	9
(United States) Gary Urinoski	0
(United States) Tony Robles	9
(United States) Joe Magee	9
(United States) Michael Sclafani	8
(United States) Coen Bell	w/o
(United Kingdom) Karl Boyes	w/d
(Honduras) Elvis Rodriguez	9
(Italy) Massimillano Corso	8
(India) Jaydev Zaveri	2
(Costa Rica) Esteban Robles	9
(United States) Osiris Crawford	w/o
Bye
(United States) Michael Hunter	2
(United States) John Moody Jr	9
(United States) Kevin Clark	9
(United States) Daniel Klochenok	4
(United States) Greg Antonakos	9
(United States) Kyle Coleman	1
(United States) Gary Serrano	3
(United States) Mason Koch	9
(United States) Tyler Blowers	9
(United States) Wilfredo D Albay Jr	4
(United States) Edward Abraham	9
(United States) Allen Hopkins	2
(United States) James Conn	3
(United States) Tyler Styer (12)	9
(Canada) Waleed Hashem	9
(Republic of Ireland) Karen Corr	8
(United States) Matt Krah	9
(United States) Tyler Adolini	8
(United States) Kang Lee	9
(Philippines) Dan Segui	3
Bye
(Canada) Brad Guthrie	w/o
(Honduras) Miguel Angel Giron Mendieta	2
(United States) Daniel Sharlow	9
(United States) April Larson	9
(Puerto Rico) Juan Jose Rosa	2
Bye
(United States) Adam Martin	w/o
(United States) Jennifer Barretta	w/o
Bye

Round 2 First to 9 racks
(Iraq) Shamel Alazzawi	5
(Singapore) Sharik Sayed	9
(United States) Evan Lunda	3
(United States) Anthony Meglino	9
(United States) Chad Bazinet	9
(United States) Justin Martin	6
(United States) Devin Poteet	8
(Poland) Tomasz Kaplan (31)	9
(United States) Ellis Brown	4
(Norway) Emil André Gangfløt	9
(United States) Steve Lillis	4
(United States) Justin Espinosa	9
(United States) Carlin Sanderson	9
(United States) Michael Mathieu	1
(United States) Raymond Linares	9
(United States) Joey Tate	4
(United States) David Daya	9
(Japan) Kenshiro Sakai	4
(United States) Vincent Cimarelli	8
(Russia) Kristina Tkach	9
(United States) Shane Wolford	9
(United States) Lukas Fracasso-Verner	3
(United States) Tony Robles	9
(United States) John Moody Sr	1
(United States) Joe Magee	2
(United States) Adam King	9
(United States) Coen Bell	2
(Japan) Masato Yoshioka	9
(Honduras) Elvis Rodriguez	4
(Poland) Radoslaw Babica	9
(Costa Rica) Esteban Robles	4
(United States) Austin Summers	9
(United States) Osiris Crawford	w/d
(Dominican Republic) Reyes Gomez	w/o
(United States) John Moody Jr	7
(Kuwait) Badar Alawadhi	9
(United States) Kevin Clark	4
(United States) Michael Yednak	9
(United States) Greg Antonakos	9
(Canada) Vincent Beaurivage	7
(United States) Mason Koch	9
(Albania) Shpendi Kaba	8
(United States) Tyler Blowers	6
(United States) Hunter Lombardo	9
(United States) Edward Abraham	7
(Qatar) Waleed Majid	9
(United States) Tyler Styer (12)	9
(United States) Keith Guenzel	0
(Canada) Waleed Hashem	8
(United States) John Hennigan	9
(United States) Matt Krah	3
(New Zealand) Sullivan Clark	9
(United States) Kang Lee	9
(United States) Chad Fairchild	5
(Canada) Brad Guthrie	9
(United States) Kelson Juan	0
(United States) Daniel Sharlow	2
(United States) Nick Antonakos	9
(United States) April Larson	9
(Canada) Stephen Folan	5
(United States) Adam Martin	5
(United States) Mark Vidal Claramunt	9
(United States) Jennifer Barretta	5
(Switzerland) Michael Schneider	9

Round 3 First to 11 racks
(Singapore) Sharik Sayed	11
(United States) Anthony Meglino	7
(United States) Chad Bazinet	1
(Poland) Tomasz Kaplan (31)	11
(Norway) Emil André Gangfløt	10
(United States) Justin Espinosa	11
(United States) Carlin Sanderson	10
(United States) Raymond Linares	11
(United States) David Daya	11
(Russia) Kristina Tkach	9
(United States) Shane Wolford	11
(United States) Tony Robles	4
(United States) Adam King	11
(Japan) Masato Yoshioka	8
(Poland) Radoslaw Babica	11
(United States) Austin Summers	4
(Dominican Republic) Reyes Gomez	3
(Kuwait) Badar Alawadhi	11
(United States) Michael Yednak	11
(United States) Greg Antonakos	3
(United States) Mason Koch	3
(United States) Hunter Lombardo	11
(Qatar) Waleed Majid	11
(United States) Tyler Styer (12)	7
(United States) John Hennigan	7
(New Zealand) Sullivan Clark	11
(United States) Kang Lee	11
(Canada) Brad Guthrie	7
(United States) Nick Antonakos	9
(United States) April Larson	11
(United States) Marc Vidal Claramunt	5
(Switzerland) Michael Schneider	11

Round 4 First to 11 racks
(Singapore) Sharik Sayed	3
(Croatia) Ivica Putnik	11
(Poland) Tomasz Kaplan (31)	11
(United States) Corey Deuel	10
(United States) Justin Espinosa	9
(Canada) John Morra	11
(United States) Raymond Linares	8
(Philippines) Jeffrey Ignacio	11
(United States) David Daya	3
(Philippines) Jeffrey De Luna	11
(United States) Shane Wolford	5
(Canada) Alex Pagulayan (21)	11
(United States) Adam King	9
(United States) Chris Reinhold (28)	11
(Poland) Radoslaw Babica	8
(Switzerland) Daniel Schneider	11
(Kuwait) Badar Alawadhi	10
(Chinese Taipei) Hsieh Chia Chen	11
(United States) Michael Yednak	7
(Saudi Arabia) Abdullah Al-Shammari	11
(United States) Hunter Lombardo	5
(Poland) Mateusz Sniegocki	11
(Qatar) Waleed Majid	8
(Philippines) Roland Garcia	11
(New Zealand) Sullivan Clark	1
(United States) Billy Thorpe (16)	11
(United States) Kang Lee	11
(United States) Suad Kantarevic	6
(United States) April Larson	7
(Poland) Wojciech Szewczyk	11
(Switzerland) Michael Schneider	10
(Bosnia and Herzegovina) Sanjin Pehlivanovic	11

Round 1 First to 9 racks
(United States) Scott Haas	w/o
Bye
(United States) Christopher Pyle	9
(India) Virat Agrawal	7
(Serbia) Dalibor Nikolin	4
(Saudi Arabia) Khalid Alghamdi	9
(United States) Tony Rudi	2
(United States) Thomas Dalfonso	9
(United States) Steven Way	2
(United States) Utpal Raval	9
Bye
(Russia) Ruslan Chinahov	w/o
(Honduras) Henry Rivera Portillo	6
(United States) Hunter Sullivan	9
(United States) Steve Kotuba	0
(Japan) Sakura Muramatsu	9
(United States) Randolph LaBonte	w/o
(Kuwait) Abdullah Alyousef	w/d
(United States) Jeremy Jones	9
(United States) Mike Salerno	0
(United States) Kevin West	9
(United States) Rob Hart	3
(United States) James Davee	w/o
Bye
(United States) Steve Fleming	9
(United States) Michael Toohig	3
(United States) Deepak Dhiman	2
(United States) Nathan Childress	9
(United States) Hendrik Drost	2
(United States) Danny Olson	9
(United States) John Francisco	9
(United States) Fred Upham	7
(Venezuela) Jesus Atencio	9
(United States) Dawn Hopkins	1
(United States) Sampson Yonko	3
(United States) Robert Frost	9
(United States) Edward Epperson	5
(United States) Kurt Kobayashi	9
(United States) Albrecht Lapena	9
(United States) Jonathan L Smith	4
(United States) Kevin Zock	9
(Puerto Rico) Michael Ortiz	2
(United States) Anthony Manning	2
(United States) Joseph Testa	9
(United States) Leo Ott	2
(United States) Kevin Guimond	9
Bye
(United States) Mike Saleh	w/o
(United States) Rick Miller	w/o
(United States) Douglas Jones	w/d
Bye
(United States) Bill Smith	w/o
Bye
(United States) Michael DeLawder	w/o
(United States) David Shlemperis	2
(United States) Nathan Wallace	9
(Canada) Erik Hjorleifson	9
(United States) Rick Scarlato Jr	1
(United States) William Hammond	w/o
Bye
Bye
(Canada) Stephen Holem	w/o
(United States) Nicholas Coppola	3
(Italy) Francesco Candela	9

Round 2 First to 9 racks
(United States) Scott Haas	9
(United States) Kyle Bova	7
(United States) Christopher Pyle	0
(United States) Earl Strickland	9
(Saudi Arabia) Khalid Alghamdi	9
(United States) Pedro Botta	5
(United States) Thomas Dalfonso	9
(United States) Paul Spaanstra	4
(United States) Utpal Raval	5
(United States) Joseph Korsiak	9
(Russia) Ruslan Chinahov	w/d
(United States) Donny Mills	w/o
(United States) Hunter Sullivan	1
(United States) Shaun Wilkie	9
(Japan) Sakura Muramatsu	2
(United States) Raed Shabib	9
(United States) Randolph LaBonte	5
(Kuwait) Hussain Al Sayyafi	9
(United States) Jeremy Jones	9
(United States) Bill Meacham	6
(United States) Kevin West	1
(Chinese Taipei) Wu Kun Lin	9
(United States) James Davee	9
(United States) Blake Baker	2
(United States) Steve Fleming	4
(United States) Anthony Conn	9
(United States) Nathan Childress	9
(Germany) Pia Filler	1
(United States) Danny Olson	4
(United States) Brandon Shuff	9
(United States) John Francisco	1
(United States) Max Watanabe	9
(Venezuela) Jesus Atencio	9
(Philippines) Daniel Dagotdot	8
(United States) Robert Frost	9
(United States) Josh Roberts	5
(United States) Kurt Kobayashi	9
(United States) Steve Craney	1
(United States) Albrecht Lapena	9
(India) Dhruvalkumar Patel	0
(United States) Kevin Zock	9
(United States) Nickolas Carson	8
(United States) Joseph Testa	9
(United States) Josh Burbul	8
(United States) Kevin Guimond	1
(Poland) Konrad Juszczyszyn	9
(United States) Mike Saleh	6
(Kuwait) Mohammad Almuhanna	9
(United States) Rick Miller	9
(United States) Chalmer Vergara	7
(United States) Bill Smith	1
(Spain) Jonas Souto Comino	9
(United States) Michael DeLawder	9
(Lebanon) Mohammad Ali Berjaoui	8
(United States) Nathan Wallace	4
(Kuwait) Omar Al Shaheen (17)	9
(Canada) Erik Hjorleifson	8
(Puerto Rico) Reinaldo Dendariarena	9
(United States) William Hammond	3
(United States) Abrin Schaad	9
(Canada) Stephen Holem	9
(South Africa) Muhummed Daydat	7
(Italy) Francesco Candela	9
(United States) Thomas Haas	3

Round 3 First to 11 racks
(United States) Scott Haas	4
(United States) Earl Strickland	11
(Saudi Arabia) Khalid Alghamdi	11
(United States) Thomas Dalfonso	1
(United States) Joseph Korsiak	11
(United States) Donny Mills	8
(United States) Shaun Wilkie	11
(United States) Raed Shabib	10
(Kuwait) Hussain Al Sayyafi	11
(United States) Jeremy Jones	7
(Chinese Taipei) Wu Kun Lin	11
(United States) James Davee	10
(United States) Anthony Conn	3
(United States) Nathan Childress	11
(United States) Brandon Shuff	11
(United States) Max Watanabe	5
(Venezuela) Jesus Atencio	11
(United States) Robert Frost	5
(United States) Kurt Kobayashi	11
(United States) Albrecht Lapena	5
(United States) Kevin Zock	8
(United States) Joseph Testa	11
(Poland) Konrad Juszczyszyn	11
(Kuwait) Mohammad Almuhanna	1
(United States) Rick Miller	2
(Spain) Jonas Souto Comino	11
(United States) Michael DeLawder	4
(Kuwait) Omar Al Shaheen (17)	11
(Puerto Rico) Reinaldo Dendariarena	6
(United States) Abrin Schaad	11
(Canada) Stephen Holem	4
(Italy) Francesco Candela	11

Round 4 First to 11 racks
(United States) Earl Strickland	11
(Germany) Moritz Neuhausen	1
(Saudi Arabia) Khalid Alghamdi	4
(Puerto Rico) Alan Rolon Rosado	11
(United States) Joseph Korsiak	2
(Philippines) Warren Kiamco	11
(United States) Shaun Wilkie	3
(United States) Skyler Woodward (15)	11
(Kuwait) Hussain Al Sayyafi	11
(United Kingdom) Kelly Fisher	10
(Chinese Taipei) Wu Kun Lin	11
(Philippines) Roberto Gomez	10
(United States) Nathan Childress	7
(United States) Blaine Barcus	11
(United States) Brandon Shuff	9
(South Africa) Jason Theron	11
(Venezuela) Jesus Atencio	2
(Spain) José Alberto Delgado	11
(United States) Kurt Kobayashi	4
(Finland) Mika Immonen	11
(United States) Joseph Testa	11
(Pakistan) Shahram Changezi	9
(Poland) Konrad Juszczyszyn	11
(United States) Demetrius Jelatis	1
(Spain) Jonas Souto Comino	11
(Philippines) James Aranas (14)	10
(Kuwait) Omar Al Shaheen (17)	w/o
(United States) Christopher Lawson	w/d
(United States) Abrin Schaad	11
(Germany) Thorsten Hohmann (30)	8
(Italy) Francesco Candela	5
(Austria) Albin Ouschan (3)	11

==== Rounds 5–8 ====
Round 5 First to 11 racks
(Croatia) Ivica Putnik	5
(Poland) Tomasz Kaplan (31)	11
(Canada) John Morra	11
(Philippines) Jeffrey Ignacio	2
(Philippines) Jeffrey De Luna	11
(Canada) Alex Pagulayan (21)	0
(United States) Chris Reinhold (28)	6
(Switzerland) Daniel Schneider	11
(Chinese Taipei) Hsieh Chia Chen	11
(Saudi Arabia) Abdullah Al-Shammari	7
(Poland) Mateusz Sniegocki	5
(Philippines) Roland Garcia	11
(United States) Billy Thorpe (16)	11
(United States) Kang Lee	5
(Poland) Wojciech Szewczyk	11
(Bosnia and Herzegovina) Sanjin Pehlivanovic	6
(United States) Earl Strickland	1
(Puerto Rico) Alan Rolon Rosado	11
(Philippines) Warrem Kiamco	9
(United States) Skyler Woodward (15)	11
(Kuwait) Hussain Al Sayyafi	5
(Chinese Taipei) Wu Kun Lin	11
(United States) Blaine Barcus	8
(South Africa) Jason Theron	11
(Spain) José Alberto Delgado	11
(Finland) Mika Immonen	6
(United States) Joseph Testa	4
(Poland) Konrad Juszczyszyn	11
(Spain) Jonas Souto Comino	8
(Kuwait) Omar Al Shaheen (17)	11
(United States) Abrin Schaad	0
(Austria) Albin Ouschan (3)	11

Round 6 First to 11 racks
(Poland) Tomasz Kaplan (31)	11
(Poland) Wiktor Zieliński	9
(Canada) John Morra	11
(Lithuania) Pijus Labutis	5
(Philippines) Jeffrey De Luna	11
(Germany) Ralf Souquet (11)	3
(Switzerland) Daniel Schneider	3
(Philippines) Carlo Biado (27)	11
(Chinese Taipei) Hsieh Chia Chen	1
(Albania) Eklent Kaçi (7)	11
(Philippines) Roland Garcia	8
(Netherlands) Niels Feijen (10)	11
(United States) Billy Thorpe (16)	3
(Austria) Mario He	11
(Poland) Wojciech Szewczyk	11
(United States) BJ Ussery	4
(Puerto Rico) Alan Rolon Rosado	6
(Germany) Joshua Filler (1)	11
(United States) Skyler Woodward (15)	11
(Denmark) Bahram Lotfy	8
(Chinese Taipei) Wu Kun Lin	6
(Japan) Naoyuki Oi (9)	11
(South Africa) Jason Theron	11
(United Kingdom) Judd Trump (25)	10
(Spain) José Alberto Delgado	9
(Netherlands) Marco Teutscher	11
(Poland) Konrad Juszczyszyn	11
(Singapore) Toh Lian Han	5
(Kuwait) Omar Al Shaheen (17)	10
(Chinese Taipei) Chang Jung-Lin (13)	11
(Austria) Albin Ouschan (3)	11
(Greece) Alex Kazakis (4)	8

Round 7 First to 11 racks
(Poland) Tomasz Kaplan (31)	6
(Canada) John Morra	11
(Philippines) Jeffrey De Luna	6
(Philippines) Carlo Biado (27)	11
(Albania) Eklent Kaçi (7)	9
(Netherlands) Niels Feijen (10)	11
(Austria) Mario He	11
(Poland) Wojciech Szewcyk	5
(Germany) Joshua Filler (1)	11
(United States) Skyler Woodward (15)	4
(Japan) Naoyuki Oi (9)	11
(South Africa) Jason Theron	3
(Netherlands) Marco Teutscher	11
(Poland) Konrad Juszczyszyn	5
(Chinese Taipei) Chang Jung-Lin (13)	1
(Austria) Albin Ouschan (3)	11

Round 8 First to 11 racks
(Canada) John Morra	11
(Denmark) Mickey Krause	6
(Philippines) Carlo Biado (27)	11
(United Kingdom) Jayson Shaw (8)	8
(Netherlands) Niels Feijen (10)	6
(Philippines) Rodrigo Geronimo	11
(Austria) Mario He	11
(Hungary) Olivér Szolnoki (20)	5
(Germany) Joshua Filler (1)	3
(Poland) Mieszko Fortuński	11
(Japan) Naoyuki Oi (9)	11
(Netherlands) Marc Bijsterbosch (22)	4
(Netherlands) Marco Teutscher	11
(United Kingdom) Darren Appleton (26)	6
(Austria) Albin Ouschan (3)	2
(United States) Shane Van Boening (2)	11

=== Finals ===
Last 16; First to 11 racks
(Singapore) Aloysius Yapp (32)	11
(United States) Shane Van Boening (2)	5
(Estonia) Denis Grabe (24)	10
(Philippines) Rodrigo Geronimo	11
(Austria) Max Lechner (5)	11
(Poland) Mieszko Fortuński	4
(Philippines) Dennis Orcollo (29)	11
(Austria) Mario He	6
(Philippines) Johann Chua (19)	11
(Canada) John Morra	8
(Spain) David Alcaide (6)	10
(Philippines) Carlo Biado (27)	11
(Russia) Fedor Gorst (23)	11
(Netherlands) Marco Teutscher	7
(Spain) Francisco Sanchez Ruiz (18)	7
(Japan) Naoyuki Oi (9)	11

Quarter-finals; First to 11 racks
(Singapore) Aloysius Yapp (32)	11
(Philippines) Rodrigo Geronimo	6
(Austria) Max Lechner (5)	7
(Philippines) Dennis Orcollo (29)	11
(Philippines) Johann Chua (19)	10
(Philippines) Carlo Biado (27)	11
(Russia) Fedor Gorst (23)	9
(Japan) Naoyuki Oi (9)	11

Semi-finals; First to 11 racks
(Singapore) Aloysius Yapp (32)	11
(Philippines) Dennis Orcollo (29)	6
(Philippines) Carlo Biado (27)	11
(Japan) Naoyuki Oi (9)	9

Final; First to 13 racks
(Singapore) Aloysius Yapp (32)	8
(Philippines) Carlo Biado (27)	13
