= James Aranas =

Filipino pool player

Personal information
- Nickname: Dodong Diamond
- Born: April 29, 1992 (age 33) Philippines

Pool career
- Country: Philippines

Tournament wins
- Major: 2023 World Cup of Pool
- Other titles: 2023 Manny Pacquiao Cup Ten-ball Doubles

Zoren James Aranas (born April 29, 1992) is a Filipino professional pool player from Cavite, Philippines, nicknamed "Dodong Diamond". Aranas won the 2019 Super Billiard Expo Championship and the 2023 World Cup of Pool with Johann Chua.

== Career ==
In 2018, Aranas secured his first international title after he defeated Chris Melling twice in the first Annual Asian Culture Day held at the Orleans Hotel and Casino Las Vegas. This was an opening event on the Efren Reyes retirement tour. The following year, Aranas won the ten-ball event at the Super Billiard Expo Diamond Open, defeating Oscar Dominguez 13–10 in the final.

In 2022, Aranas reached the finals of APP Asian 9-Ball Open held in Singapore but would lose to Taiwan's Ko Pin-yi, 11‍–‍13.

At the 2023 World Cup of Pool, he was selected to represent the Philippines with partner Johann Chua. They reached the final, where they played the German team of Joshua Filler and Moritz Neuhausen. They won the final 11‍–‍7 in the final. The team were the first to win the World Cup of Pool despite entering as an unseeded team.

== Personal life ==
Aranas was deported and banned from the United States for five years in February 2022. He had been using a tourist visa instead of one designed for an athlete.

In 2024, the San Miguel Corporation-Philippine Sportswriters Association (SMC-PSA) recognised Aranas, Chua and Centeno for their remarkable achievements in billiards.

The SMC-PSA awards honour the distinction, commitment, and accomplishments of athletes and organisations that have made a substantial impact on the nation's success on the international stage.

== Titles and achievements ==
- 2025 Marboys Scotch Doubles Ten-ball Invitational
- 2024 CPBA Nine-ball Teams Invitational (Philippines vs. Chinese Taipei)
- 2023 Bandung Open Ten-ball Championship
- 2023 World Cup of Pool - with (Johann Chua)
- 2023 Manny Pacquiao Cup Ten-ball Doubles - with (Jeffrey Ignacio)
- 2021 TTMD Ten-ball Open
- 2021 Annual Brendan Crockett Memorial
- 2020 Scotty Townsend Memorial Nine-ball
- 2019 Super Billiard Expo Diamond Ten-ball Open
- 2019 Barry Behrman Memorial
- 2019 Beasley Custom Cue Open Nine-ball
- 2019 Predator Qualifier Ten-ball Championship
- 2019 Star City Ten-ball Shootout
- 2018 Music City Classic Open
- 2018 Scotty Townsend Memorial Nine-ball
- 2018 Annual Bob Stocks Memorial
- 2018 Pro-Am Bar box Championship
- 2018 Barry Behrman Memorial
- 2018 1st Annual Culture Day Open Ten-ball
- 2018 Maryland State Nine-ball
- 2017 Action Pool Tour Eight-ball Division
