= Jonás Souto =

Spanish pool player (born 2001)

Personal information
- Nickname: "The Island Boy"
- Born: 8 December 2001 (age 24) Pontevedra, Spain

Pool career
- Country: Spain
- Pool games: Nine-ball

Tournament wins
- Current rank: 14th

Jonás Souto (born 8 December 2001) is a Spanish professional pool player.

== Biography ==
Souto was born in Pontevedra on 8 December 2001. His family moved to Ibiza when he was 1. He is nicknamed "The Island Boy".

He won the 2019 WPA World Nine-ball Junior Championship at the under-19 level, defeating Sanjin Pehlivanović in the final.

At the 2024 FSR Nineball Open, Souto defeated Ralf Souquet in the quarter-finals, before losing to Francisco Sánchez Ruiz, who went on to win the title. Souto won the 2024 Mexico Open. At the 2024 WPA World Nine-ball Championship, he reached the last-32 round. Souto reached the final of the 2025 UK Open Pool Championship, but lost 1–13 to Aloysius Yapp. At the 2026 edition, he defeated Yapp in the quarter-finals, but he was eliminated by Wojciech Szewczyk in the semi-finals.

As of July 2026, Souto was ranked 14th in the World Nineball Tour world rankings.
