= Pijus Labutis =

Lithuanian pool player

Personal information
- Nickname: Labubu
- Born: 30 October 1997 (age 28) Vilnius, Lithuania

Pool career
- Country: Lithuania

Tournament wins
- Major: Hanoi Open
- Other titles: Estonian Open

Pijus Labutis (born 30 October 1997) is a Lithuanian professional pool player.

== Career ==
At the start of 2025, Labutis won the Derby City Bigfoot Classic with a 10‍–‍7 victory over Joshua Filler in the final. Labutis secured his first World Nineball Tour ranking-event victory at the Estonian Open. He overcame Casper Matikainen in the final. He then won his first matchroom-title at the Hanoi Open. His route to the final included wins against Carlo Biado and Robbie Capito, and in the final he overcame Moritz Neuhausen 13‍–‍7. After the match, Labutis said “I’ve fallen short in a few semi-finals before, and it was hard to keep believing at times. But I told myself that if I kept working, my time would come — and today it did." He also rose to number seven in the world rankings. At the end of the year, he was selected to represent Europe in the 2025 Mosconi Cup.

== Titles ==
Titles include:

- 2025 Mosconi Cup
- 2025 Hanoi Open Pool Championship
- 2025 Mezz Hill-hill Estonian Open
- 2025 Derby City Classic Bigfoot Challenge
