= Jayson Shaw =

Scottish pool player (born 1988)

Personal information
- Nickname: "Eagle Eye"
- Born: 13 September 1988 (age 38) Glasgow, Scotland

Pool career
- Country: Scotland
- Pool games: Nine-ball, ten-ball, eight-ball
- Best finish: Quarter-finals 2016 WPA World Nine-ball Championship

Tournament wins
- Major: U.S. Open Pool Championship, (2017)
- World Champion: Blackball (2010)
- Highest rank: 7

Jayson Shaw (born 13 September 1988) is a Scottish professional pool player. In 2010, Shaw was a WPA World Blackball Champion. Shaw has won the Mosconi Cup seven times whilst representing Team Europe.

== Career ==
In 2016, Shaw won the 25th International Challenge of Champions event. He defeated Shane Van Boening in the final in Atlantic City.

In 2017, Shaw dominated Eklent Kaçi, 13–4, to win the 42nd U.S. Open Pool Championship in Nine-ball pool.

Shaw also appeared representing Europe at the Mosconi Cup, winning the event in 2016, 2017, 2020, 2021, 2022, 2023, 2024 and 2025. He won the MVP award at the 2020, 2021 and 2024 events. At the 2024 Mosconi Cup he became the first player-captain to win the MVP award.

On 18 January 2022, Shaw set a new world high run record in 14.1 straight pool with a score of 714. This record was broken by himself on January 6, 2025, with a new high-run of 832 balls.

In 2023, Shaw won the inaugural Hanoi Open Pool Championship in Hanoi, Vietnam, after defeating Albin Ouschan in a dramatic final frame decider 13–12 to secure his first major Matchroom title.

== Personal life ==
Shaw and his wife own a pool room in West Haven, Connecticut. It was first established in 2002 by Shaw's wife's parents and during the COVID-19 pandemic, Shaw and his wife took it over for them.

== Titles and achievements ==
- 2025 Mosconi Cup
- 2025 14.1 Record High Run. 832 Consecutive Balls
- 2024 Mosconi Cup (MVP)
- 2024 Mosconi Cup
- 2024 Super Billiards Expo Players Championship
- 2023 Mosconi Cup
- 2023 Hanoi Open Pool Championship
- 2023 JFlowers Scottish 9-Ball Open
- 2023 Turning Stone Classic
- 2022 Mosconi Cup
- 2022 International 9-Ball Open
- 2022 Turning Stone Classic
- 2022 Super Billiards Expo Players Championship
- 2022 14.1 Record High Run. 714 Consecutive Balls
- 2022 Turning Stone Classic
- 2021 Mosconi Cup (MVP)
- 2021 Mosconi Cup
- 2020 Mosconi Cup (MVP)
- 2020 Mosconi Cup
- 2020 Euro Tour Treviso Open
- 2020 Derby City Classic Bigfoot Ten-ball Challenge
- 2019 Great Dismal Swamp Nine-ball Classic
- 2019 Empire State Ten-ball Championship
- 2019 International 9-Ball Open
- 2019 Turning Stone Classic
- 2018 Ocean State Nine-ball Championship
- 2017 AZBilliards Player of the Year
- 2017 Mosconi Cup
- 2017 Accu-Stats 14.1 Invitational
- 2017 U.S. Open Nine-ball Championship
- 2017 Accu-Stats Eight-ball Invitational
- 2017 Ginky Memorial Open Nine-ball
- 2017 West Coast Ten-ball Pro Challenge
- 2017 Turning Stone Classic
- 2017 Derby City Classic Bigfoot Ten-ball Challenge
- 2016 Billiards Digest Player of the Year
- 2016 Mosconi Cup
- 2016 International Challenge of Champions
- 2016 Kuwait Open Nine-ball Championship
- 2016 Great Dismal Swamp Nine-ball Classic
- 2016 Steinway Classic Ten-ball
- 2016 Deurne City Classic Nine-ball
- 2016 Turning Stone Classic
- 2016 Derby City Classic Bigfoot Ten-ball Challenge
- 2016 Accu-Stats Eight-ball Invitational
- 2015 Turning Stone Classic
- 2015 Turning Stone Classic
- 2014 Ocean State Nine-ball Championship
- 2014 Turning Stone Classic
- 2013 Empire State Ten-ball Championship
- 2010 WPA World Blackball Championship
